= Tyne Dock =

- Neighbourhood
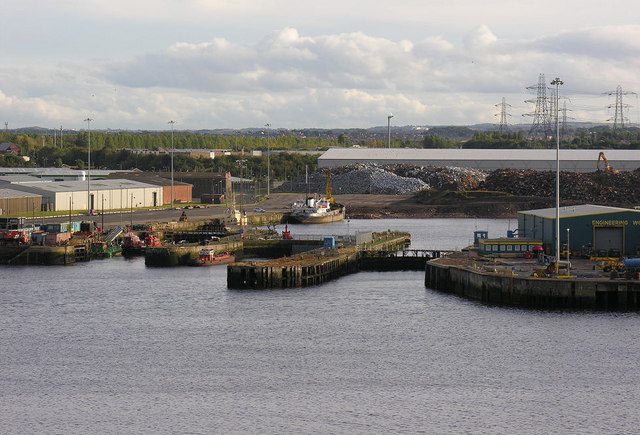
- The last remaining section of Tyne Dock viewed from a departing ferry. This has since been filled in.

- Location in Tyne & Wear
- Coordinates: 54.981°N 1.451°W
- OS grid reference: NZ352653
- Sovereign state: United Kingdom
- Country: England
- District: Tyne & Wear

Tyne Dock is a neighbourhood within the town of South Shields, Tyne and Wear, on the south bank of the River Tyne. It takes its name from the large dock on the river which was opened in 1859 by the North Eastern Railway (and acquired by the Tyne Improvement Commission in 1938) to handle Tyneside's coal exports. At its height the trade amounted to seven million tons of coal transported via the four staiths which had been built to facilitate the process. This trade declined in the second half of the twentieth century and the bridges that carried the coal trains into the dock, the famous Tyne Dock Arches, were demolished from 1977 on. The dock itself has been progressively infilled since closure, allowing for the building of modern storage warehouses. This process concluded with the final 13 acres that were filled in as part of the project to build the second Tyne Tunnel. The Tyne Dock basin was filled with 400,000 cubic metres of sediment dredged from the Tyne.

== Transport ==
Tyne Dock Metro station, on the Tyne & Wear Metro, serves the Tyne Dock area, as well as neighbouring West Harton.
