= Peter Mortimer =

Peter Mortimer may refer to:

- Peter Mortimer (composer) (born 1750), English composer and organist for the Moravian Church
- Peter Mortimer (filmmaker) (born 1974), American filmmaker
- Peter Mortimer (footballer) (1875–1951), Scottish association football player
- Peter Mortimer (rugby league) (born 1956), Australian rugby league player
- Peter Mortimer (writer) (born 1943), Tyneside writer and editor
- Peter Mortimer (DC Comics), fictional character from DC Comics
