= South Shields =

Town in Tyne and Wear, England

- Town
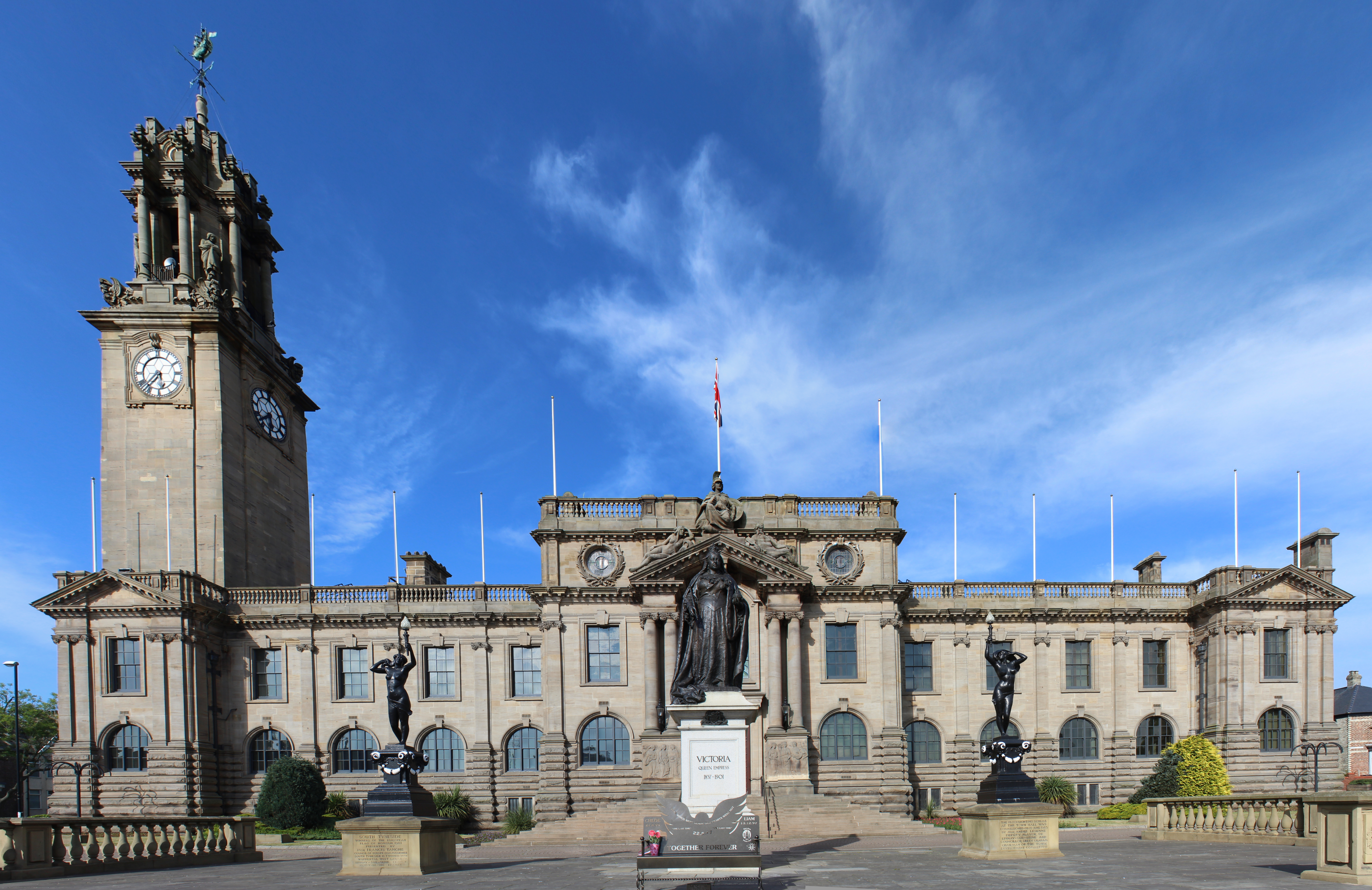
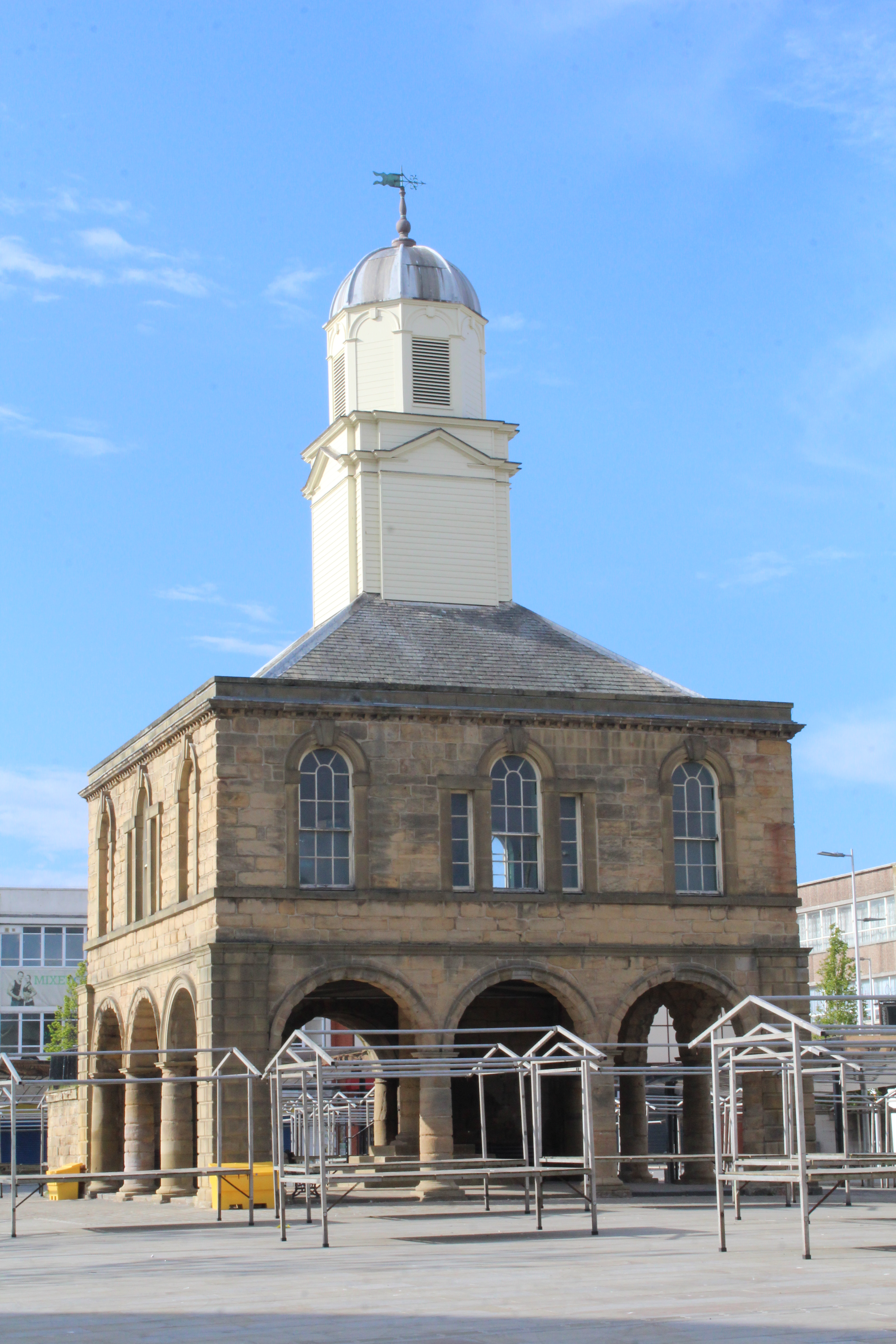
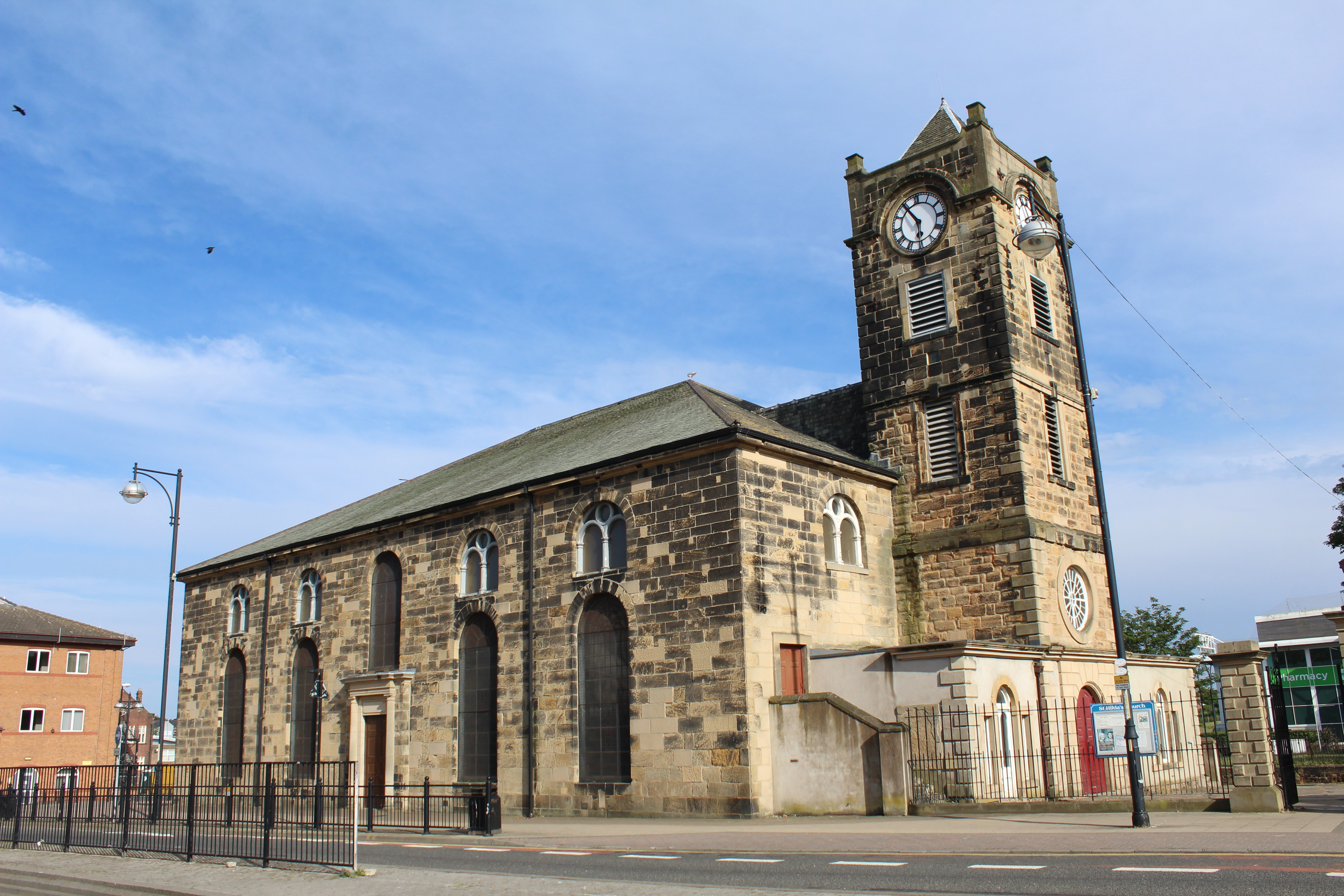
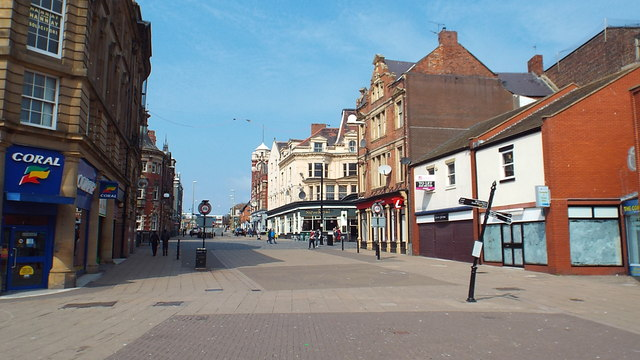
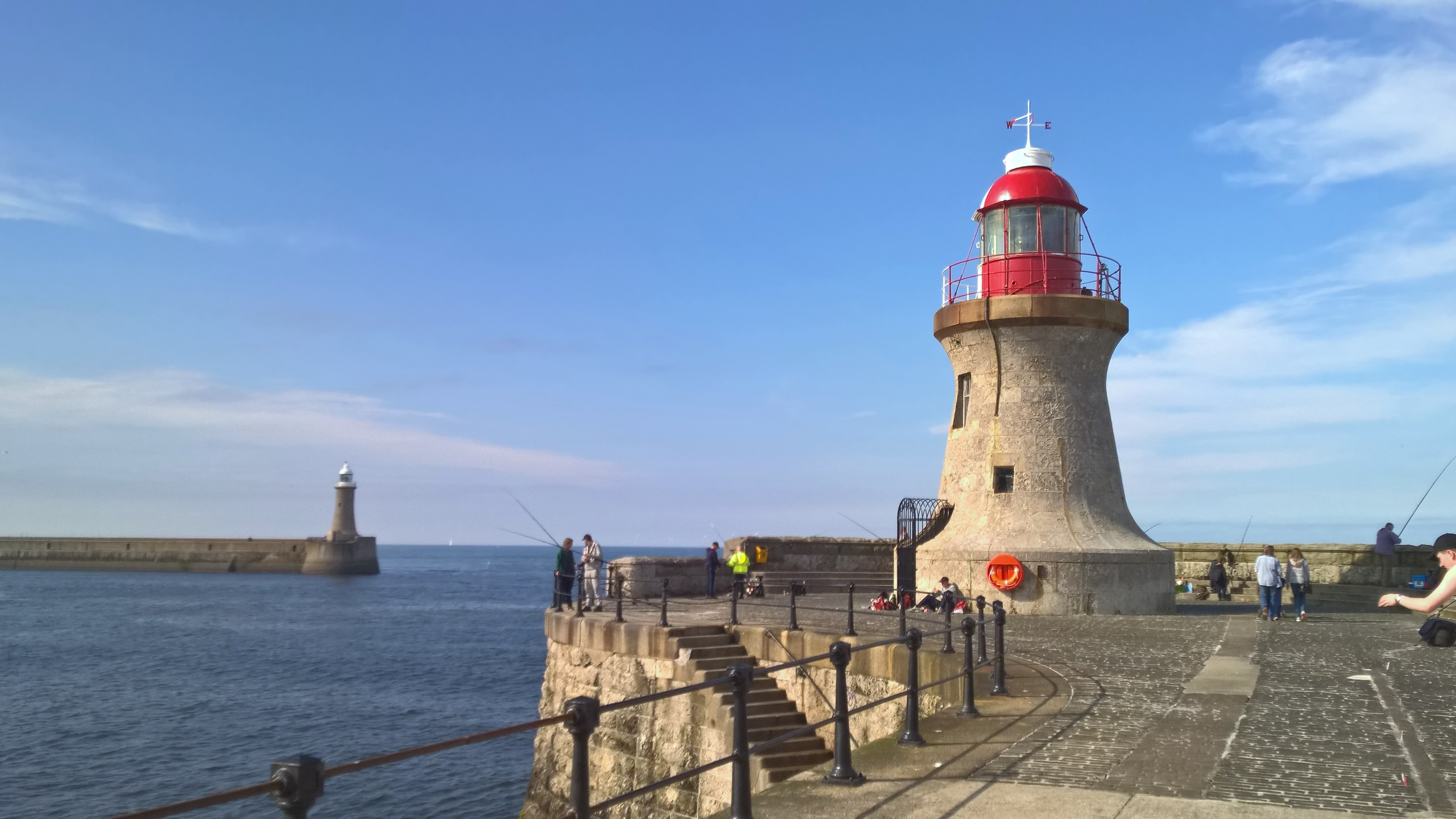
- From the top left: Top: the town hall; Middle: the old town hall and St Hilda's Church; Bottom: Mile End Road and Tyne South Pier light

- Location within Tyne and Wear
- Population: 75,337 (2021 census)
- Demonym: Sandancer
- OS grid reference: NZ365665
- Metropolitan borough: South Tyneside
- Metropolitan county: Tyne and Wear
- Region: North East
- Country: England
- Sovereign state: United Kingdom
- Post town: SOUTH SHIELDS
- Postcode district: NE33, NE34
- Dialling code: 0191
- Police: Northumbria
- Fire: Tyne and Wear
- Ambulance: North East
- UK Parliament: South Shields

South Shields (/ʃiːlz/ SHEELZ) is a coastal port town in South Tyneside, Tyne and Wear, England; it lies on the south bank of the mouth of the River Tyne. The town was known in Roman times as Arbeia and as Caer Urfa by the Early Middle Ages. It is the fourth largest settlement in Tyne and Wear, after Newcastle upon Tyne, Sunderland and Gateshead; in 2021, it had a population of 75,337.

South Shields was historically a part of County Durham, but in 1974 it became a part of the newly formed ceremonial county Tyne and Wear.

South Shields is south of North Shields and Tynemouth across the River Tyne; and east of Newcastle upon Tyne and Jarrow.

== History ==
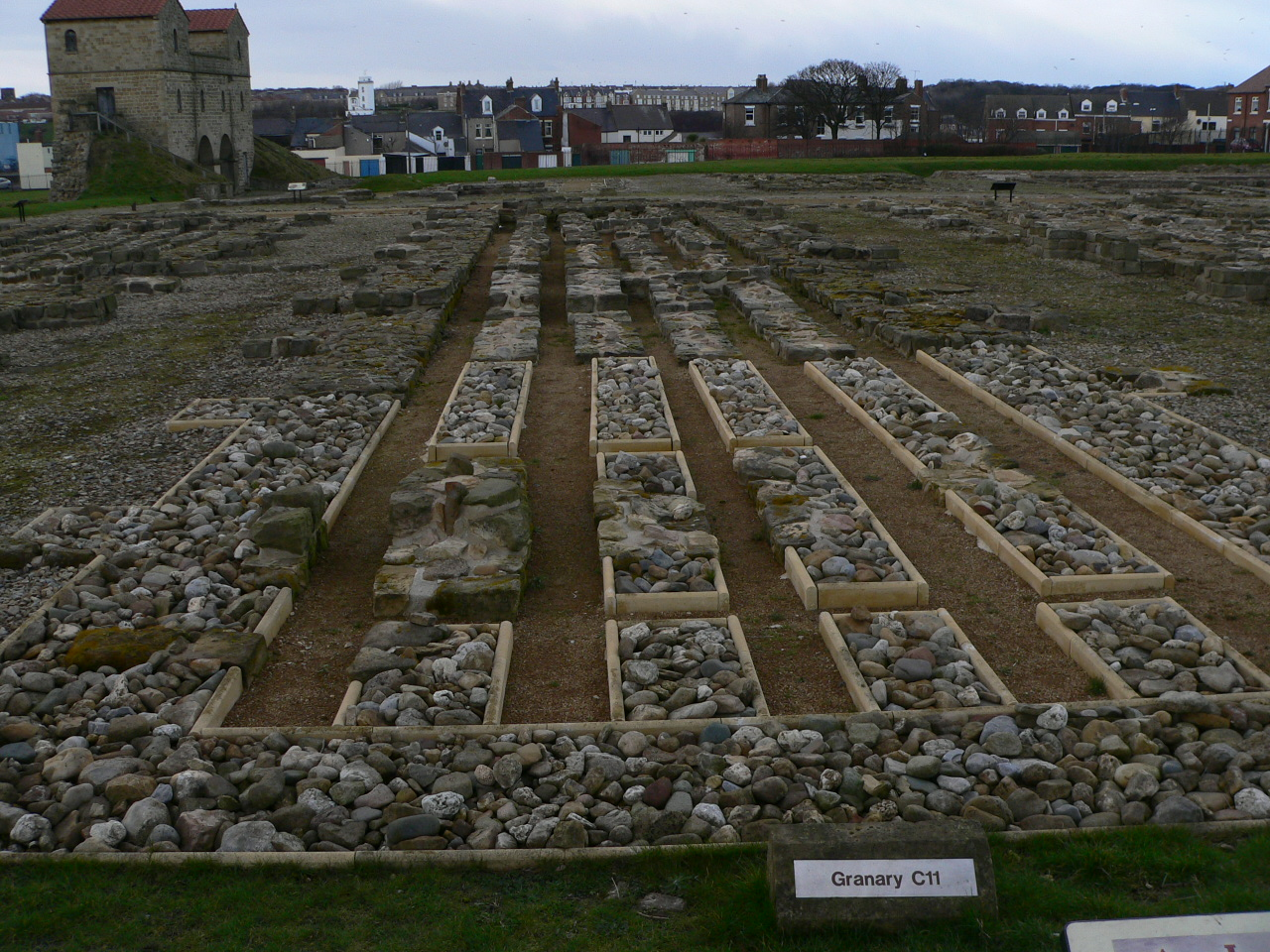
Arbeia Roman Fort: ruins and reconstruction

Evidence of human inhabitation at South Shields dates from the Late Mesolithic. The first evidence of a settlement within what is now the town of South Shields dates from pre-historic times. Stone Age arrow heads and an Iron Age round house have been discovered on the site of Arbeia Roman Fort. The Roman garrison built a fort here around AD 160 and expanded it around AD 208 to help supply their soldiers along Hadrian's Wall as they campaigned north beyond the Antonine Wall. Divisions living at the fort included Tigris bargemen (from Persia and modern day Iraq), infantry from Iberia and Gaul, and Syrian archers and spearmen. The fort was abandoned as the Roman Empire declined in the fourth century AD. Many ruins still exist today and some structures have been rebuilt as part of a modern museum and popular tourist attraction.

There is evidence that the site was used in the early post-Roman period as a British settlement. It is believed it became a royal residence of King Osric of Deira; records show that his son Oswin was born within 'Caer Urfa', by which name the fort is thought to be known after the Romans left. Furthermore, Bede records Oswin giving a parcel of land to St Hilda for the foundation of a monastery here in c. 647; the present-day church of St Hilda, by the Market Place, is said to stand on the monastic site.

In the ninth century, Scandinavian peoples made Viking raids on monasteries and settlements all along the coast, and later conquered the Anglian Kingdoms of Northumbria, Mercia and East Anglia, who hailed from Angeln in Denmark (modern day Germany). It is said in local folklore that a Viking ship was wrecked at Herd Sands in South Shields in its attempts to disembark at a cove nearby. Other Viking ships were uncovered in South Shields Denmark Centre and nearby Jarrow.

The current town was founded in 1245 and developed as a fishing port. The name South Shields developed from the 'Schele' or 'Shield', which was a small dwelling used by fishermen. Another industry that was introduced was that of salt-panning, later expanded upon in the 15th century, polluting the air and surrounding land. In 1864, a Tyne Commissioners dredger brought up a nine-pounder breech-loading cannon; more cannonballs have been found in the sands beside the Lawe; these artifacts belonged to the English civil war. At the outbreak of the war in 1642, the North, West and Ireland supported the King; the South East and Presbyterian Scotland supported Parliament. In 1644 Parliament's Scottish Covenanter allies, in a lengthy battle, seized the town and its Royalist fortification, the fortification was close to the site of the original Roman fort. They also seized the town of Newburn. These raids were done to aid their ongoing siege of the heavily fortified Newcastle upon Tyne, and in a bid to control the River Tyne, and the North, and the Shields siege helped cause their battalions to maneuver south to York; this may have also led to a brief winter skirmish on the outskirts of Boldon, though the topography is not favourable for a battle.

In the 19th century, coal mining, alkaline production and glass making led to a boom in the town. The population increased from 12,000 in 1801 to 75,000 by the 1860s, bolstered by economic migration from Ireland, Scotland and other parts of England. These industries played a fundamental part in creating wealth both regionally and nationally. In 1832, with the Great Reform Act, South Shields and Gateshead were each given their own Member of Parliament and became boroughs, resulting in taxes being paid to the Government instead of the Bishops of Durham. However, the rapid growth in population brought on by the expansion of industry made sanitation a problem, as evident by Cholera outbreaks and the building of the now-listed Cleadon Water Tower to combat the problem. In the 1850s 'The Tyne Improvement Commission' began to develop the river, dredging it to make it deeper and building the large, impressive North and South Piers to help prevent silt build up within the channel. Shipbuilding (along with coal mining), previously a monopoly of the Freemen of Newcastle, became another prominent industry in the town, with John Readhead & Sons Shipyard the largest.

During World War I, German Zeppelin airships bombed South Shields in 1916. Later, during World War II, the German Luftwaffe repeatedly attacked the town and caused massive damage to industries which supported the war effort. It killed many innocent residents, including in a bomb shelter in the market place where the deceased were commemorated in a cobblestone of the British flag; the bodies were controversially removed and interred elsewhere.

Gradually, throughout the late 20th century, the coal and shipbuilding industries were closed, due to competitive pressures from more cost-effective sources of energy (including workers) and more efficient shipbuilding elsewhere in Eastern Europe (e.g. Poland) and in South East Asia. In the 21st century, the local economy primarily includes port-related, ship repair and offshore industries, manufacturing, retail (at nearby Newcastle, Durham, Washington and Sunderland), the public sector and the ever-increasing role of tourism. This is illustrated by the new multi-million Haven centre, Dunes centre and seaside improvements in the coastal area and a new multimillion-pound library The Word.

== Geography ==
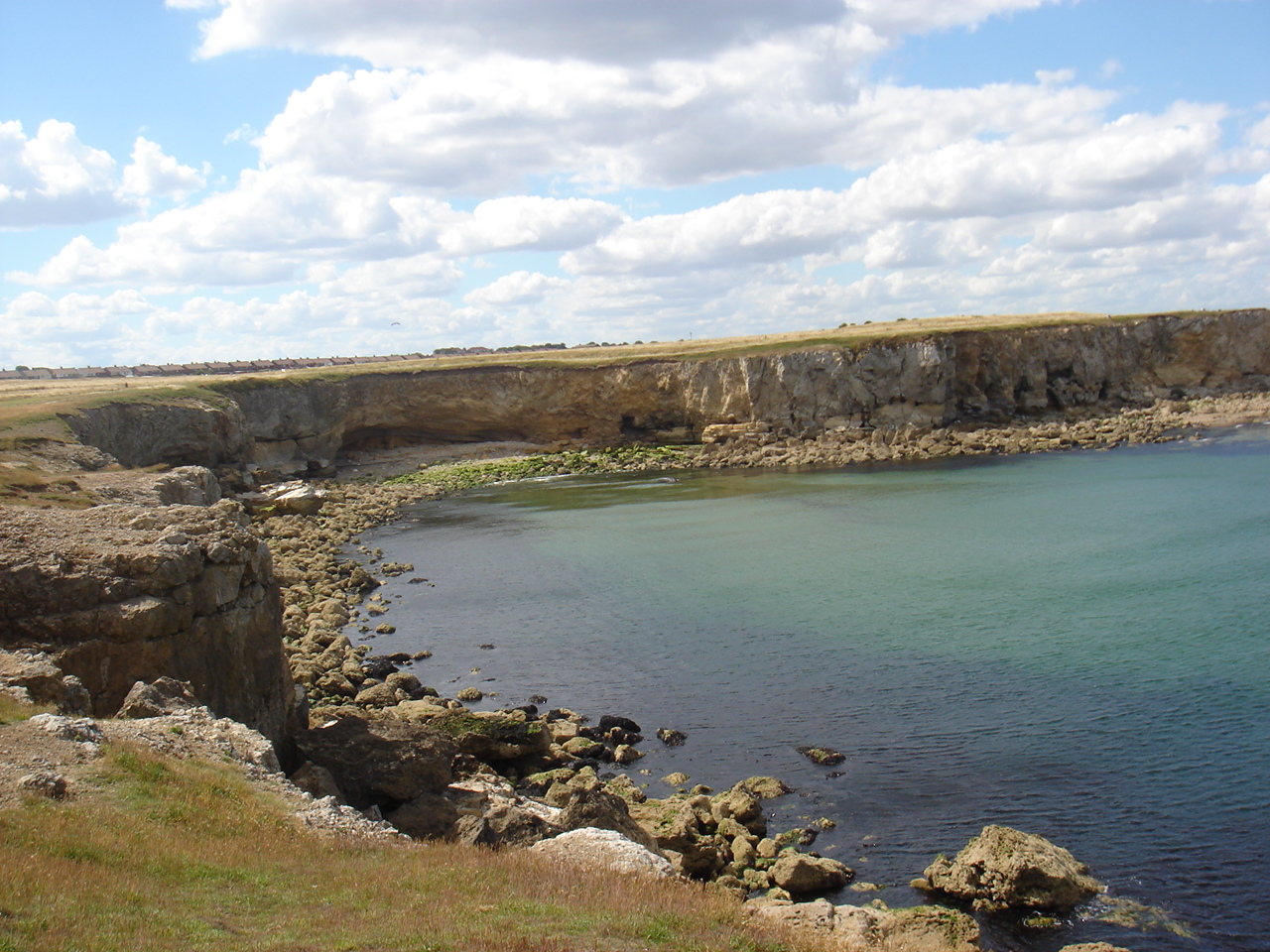
Frenchman's Bay: much of the South Shields' coastline is undeveloped, partly as a result of natural sea erosion

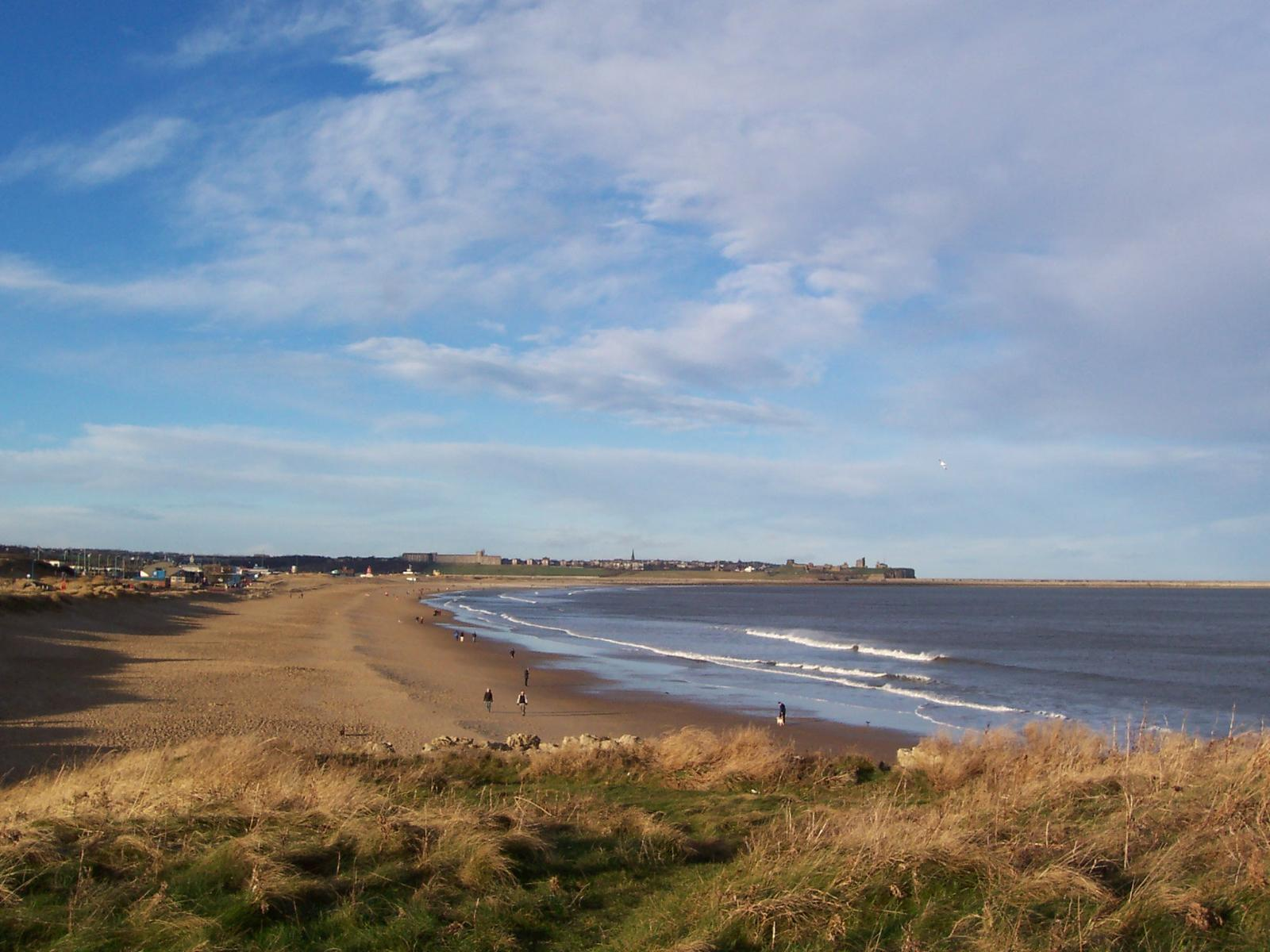
Sandhaven Beach

South Shields is situated in a peninsula setting, where the river Tyne meets the North Sea. It has six miles of coastline and three miles of river frontage, dominated by the massive North and South Piers at the mouth of the Tyne. These are best viewed from the Lawe Top, which also houses two replicas of cannon captured from the Russians during the Crimean War, the originals having been melted down during World War II.

The town slopes gently from Cleadon Hills down to the river. Cleadon Hills are made conspicuous by the Victorian Cleadon Water Tower and pumping station (opened in 1860 to improve sanitation) and a now derelict windmill, both of which are listed and can be seen from many miles away and also out at sea.

South Shields boasts extensive beaches, sand dunes and coves, as well as dramatic Magnesian Limestone cliffs with grassy areas above known as The Leas, which cover three miles of the coastline and are a National Trust protected area. Marsden Bay, with its famous Marsden Rock and historic Grotto public house and restaurant set in the cliffs, is home to one of the largest seabird colonies in Britain.

One of the most historic parts of the town is Westoe village, which consists of a quiet street of Grade I and Grade II listed Georgian and Victorian houses; many of these had been built by business leaders from the coal and shipping industries in the town. This street was often the setting for a number of books by the novelist Catherine Cookson. Westoe village was once a separate village about a mile from South Shields, but urban sprawl has now consumed it, along with the village of Harton to the south on the main route towards Cleadon and Sunderland.

=== Climate ===
The area's climate has mild differences between highs and lows; there is adequate rainfall year-round. The Köppen Climate Classification subtype for this climate is "Cfb" (Marine West Coast Climate/Oceanic climate).

Climate data for South Shields
Month	Jan	Feb	Mar	Apr	May	Jun	Jul	Aug	Sep	Oct	Nov	Dec	Year
Mean daily maximum °C (°F)	7 (45)	8 (46)	9 (48)	10 (50)	13 (55)	15 (59)	18 (64)	18 (64)	16 (61)	13 (55)	9 (48)	7 (45)	12 (54)
Mean daily minimum °C (°F)	3 (37)	3 (37)	4 (39)	5 (41)	8 (46)	10 (50)	13 (55)	13 (55)	10 (50)	8 (46)	5 (41)	3 (37)	7 (45)
Average precipitation mm (inches)	33 (1.3)	33 (1.3)	30 (1.2)	43 (1.7)	48 (1.9)	43 (1.7)	38 (1.5)	48 (1.9)	48 (1.9)	53 (2.1)	53 (2.1)	51 (2)	520 (20.6)
Source: Weatherbase

== Demographics ==
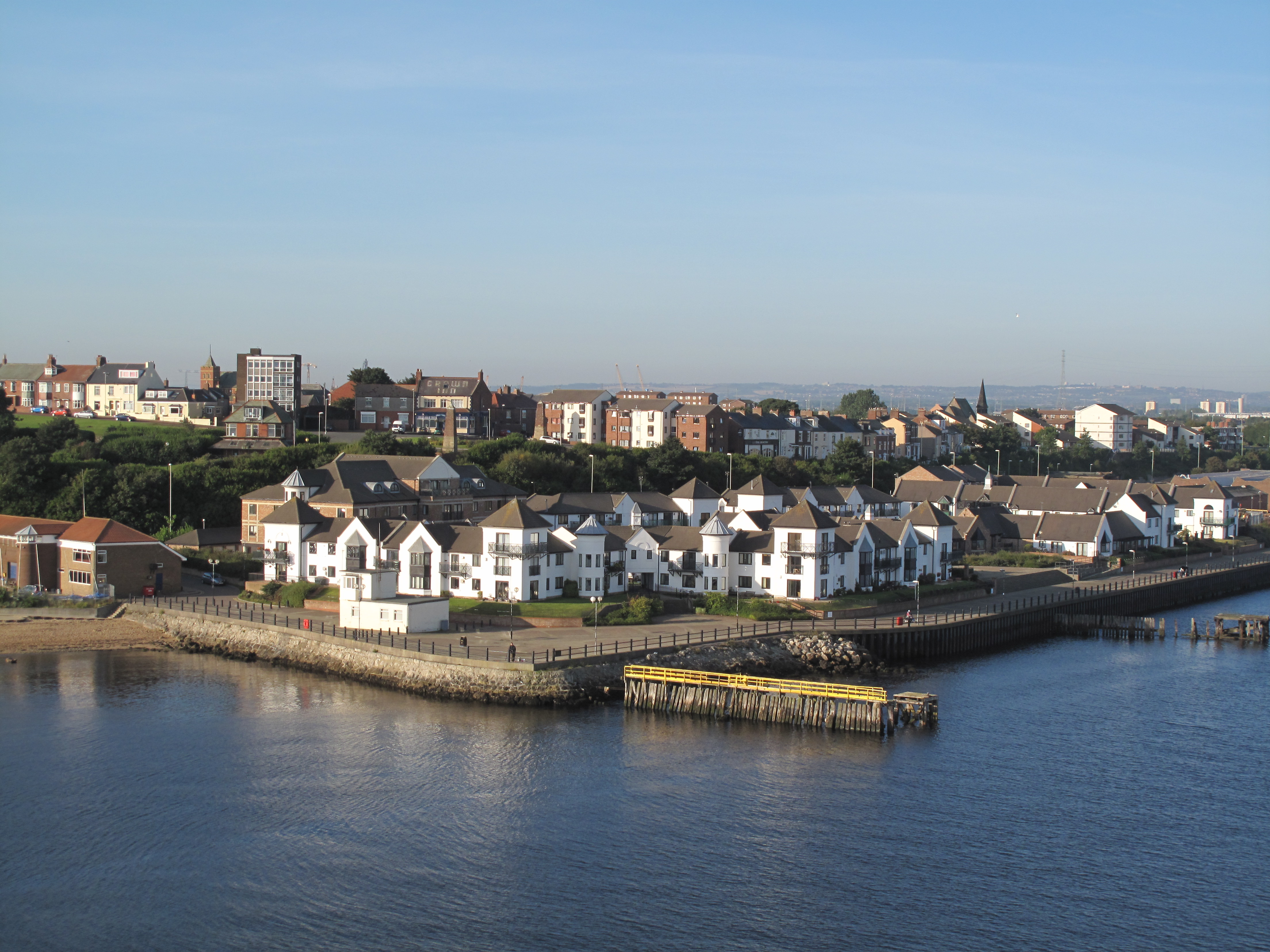
A view of the town

Before 1820, South Shields was a predominantly sparse hamlet- and village-based rural economy with some small-scale shipbuilding, glass making and salt processing along the riverside. Beyond 1820 and into the Industrial Revolution, South Shields expanded into an urban settlement built around shipbuilding and coal mining. Migration came from up the river Tyne, with other migrants from rural County Durham, Northumberland, Scotland and Ireland. The majority of the people living in South Shields are descendants of those who migrated and settled in the area during the Industrial Revolution in order to work in expanding coalmines and shipyards. Towards the end of the 19th century, with the British Navy needing seamen, Yemeni British sailors settled in the town, this resulted in the first roots of the Yemeni British community in the town.

South Shields Compared 2011
	South Shields	South Tyneside
White British	93.3%	95.0%
Asian	3.2%	2.2%
Black	0.4%	0.3%

In South Shields, 6.7% of the population are from an ethnic minority (non-White British), compared with 5.0% in the surrounding borough of South Tyneside. Most of the Asians in South Shields are Bangladeshi, with the Beacon and Bents ward that covers South Shields town centre, had 9.9% of the population registering as that ethnicity. The Bangladeshi community is the third largest in Tyne and Wear, after Newcastle upon Tyne and Sunderland, with 1.7% of the town's population being Bangladeshi or 1,300 people. Nearly all of the ethnic minority population in South Tyneside is concentrated in South Shields town centre and suburban areas immediately to the south such as Rekendyke and Westoe.

The population of the South Tyneside Metropolitan Borough had decreased from 152,785, in 2001, to 148,127 in 2011. In 2001, the population of South Shields was 82,854. Population data from the 2011 United Kingdom census classifies South Shields as a "medium-sized coastal town".

=== Yemeni community ===
South Shields has been home to a Yemeni British community since the 1890s. The main reason for the Yemeni arrival was the supply of seamen, such as engine room firemen, to British merchant vessels. Similar communities were founded in Hull, Liverpool and Cardiff. In 1909, the first Arab Seamen's Boarding House opened in the Holborn riverside district of the town.

At the time of World War I, there was a shortage of crews due to the demands of the fighting and many Yemenis were recruited to serve on British ships at the port of Aden, then a British protectorate. At the end of the war, the Yemeni population of South Shields had risen to over 3,000. Shields lost one of the largest proportions of Merchant Navy sailors. Approximately 1 in 4 of these men was of Yemeni background. The port in South Shields employed men of Yemeni, Aden, Somali, African, Indian and Malaysian nationalities.

Disputes over jobs led to race riots – also called the Arab Riots – in 1919 and 1930. However, over time, attitudes to Yemenis in the town were softened; there has been no significant recurrence of this violence.

Following World War II, the Yemeni population declined, partly due to migrations to other industrial areas such as Birmingham, Liverpool and Sheffield. However, the main reason for the reduction in numbers was the end of the shipping industry and the need for sailors as coal-burning ships decreased in numbers. Today, the Yemeni population numbers around 1,000. Many Yemeni sailors married local women and became integrated with the wider community, resulting with a migrant population less distinct than in other mixed communities across the UK. The Yemeni are the first, settled Muslim community in Britain.

There is a mosque at Laygate, including the Yemeni School, which was visited by American boxer Muhammad Ali in 1977. He had his marriage blessed at the Al-Azhar Mosque, one of the earliest mosques in UK. This story is covered in a documentary film, The King of South Shields. Throughout April and early May 2008, the BALTIC Arts Centre in Gateshead chronicled the Yemeni community of South Shields, including interviews with the last remaining survivors of the first Yemeni generation. The exhibition depicted the Yemeni story as an example of early successful multi-cultural integration in Britain, as well as showcasing the high-profile 1977 visit by Muhammad Ali.

In 2005, the Customs House commissioned author Peter Mortimer to write a play on the subject of the 1930 Yemeni Riot. The resultant play RIOT was staged at the venue in 2005 and 2008.

In 2008, South Shields resident and filmmaker Tina Gharavi unveiled plans for a plaque to mark Ali's visit.

In 2008, a critically acclaimed exhibition about the South Shields Yemeni community was held entitled The Last of the Dictionary Men – Stories from South Shields' Yemeni Sailors, was held at the Baltic Centre for Contemporary Art, Gateshead.

In 2009, the detective series George Gently, based on the novels by Alan Hunter, portrayed the Yemeni integration in a 1960s setting.

=== Bangladeshi community ===
The Bangladeshi community is larger than the Yemeni community, despite being less established. It is the third largest in the North East of England.

In 2008, the Bangladesh Welfare Association was opened in South Shields.

== Governance ==
South Shields is a safe Labour Party Parliamentary seat, the only constituency in existence since the Great Reform Act of 1832 never to have elected a Conservative MP. It is currently held by Emma Lewell, who won the seat in a by-election held on 3 May 2013 which had been triggered by the retirement from politics of the previous incumbent David Miliband, who had served as Foreign Secretary in the government of Gordon Brown. Previous incumbents of the constituency's seat include former cabinet ministers David Clark and Chuter Ede; the latter was Home Secretary in Clement Attlee's post-war government for six years.

The local authority, South Tyneside Metropolitan Borough Council, is also controlled by Labour.

The town has a local independent political party, the Progressive Party. This broadly centre-right party was formed in the 1950s to address hostility towards the Conservative Party. The Progressives have no representation beyond South Shields. The party controlled the old County borough of South Shields council until 1974.

== Economy ==
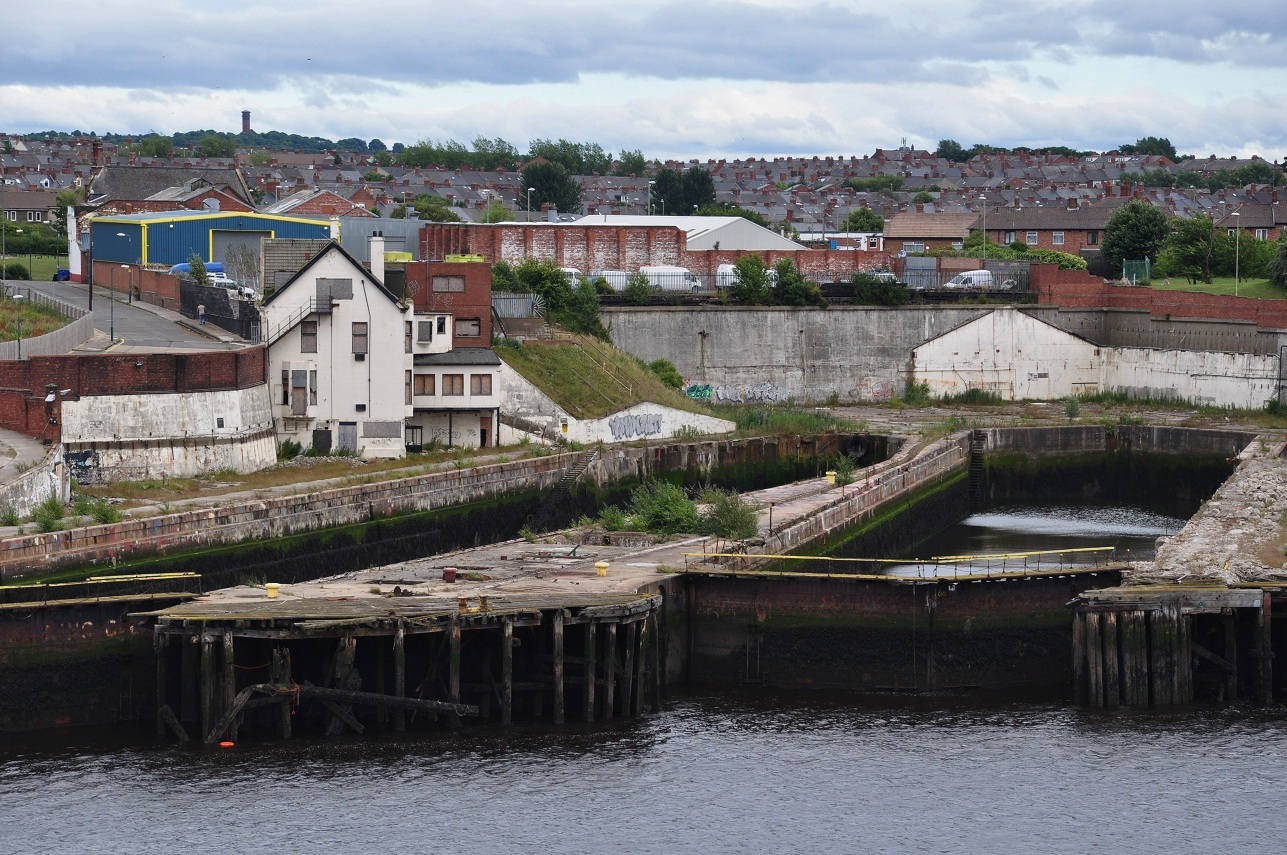
Abandoned docks in South Shields' Harbour

The last shipbuilder, John Readhead & Sons, closed in 1984 and the last pit, Westoe Colliery, closed in 1993. Today, the town relies largely on service industries, whilst many residents commute to work in nearby Newcastle upon Tyne, Gateshead, North Tyneside and Sunderland.

Despite a skilled local workforce, South Tyneside had the highest unemployment rate in mainland Britain for many years, although, between December 2002 and December 2008, unemployment in South Shields fell by 17.8% and that of South Tyneside by 17.7%, the best performance in the North East region over that time period.

The Guardian reported the unemployment rate in January 2011 to be 6.5% and at 7.5% in October 2011.

The Port of Tyne is one of the UK's most important and is further developing its freight and passenger activities. In 2007, it imported two million tonnes of coal. Manufacturing and ship repair/engineering are other significant sectors.

South Shields benefits from significant public and private sector investment. More recently, this has included primarily the town centre, riverside and foreshore areas, given the decline of once-traditional heavy industries with the town's growing importance as a major commercial centre and tourist destination.

=== Leisure and tourism ===
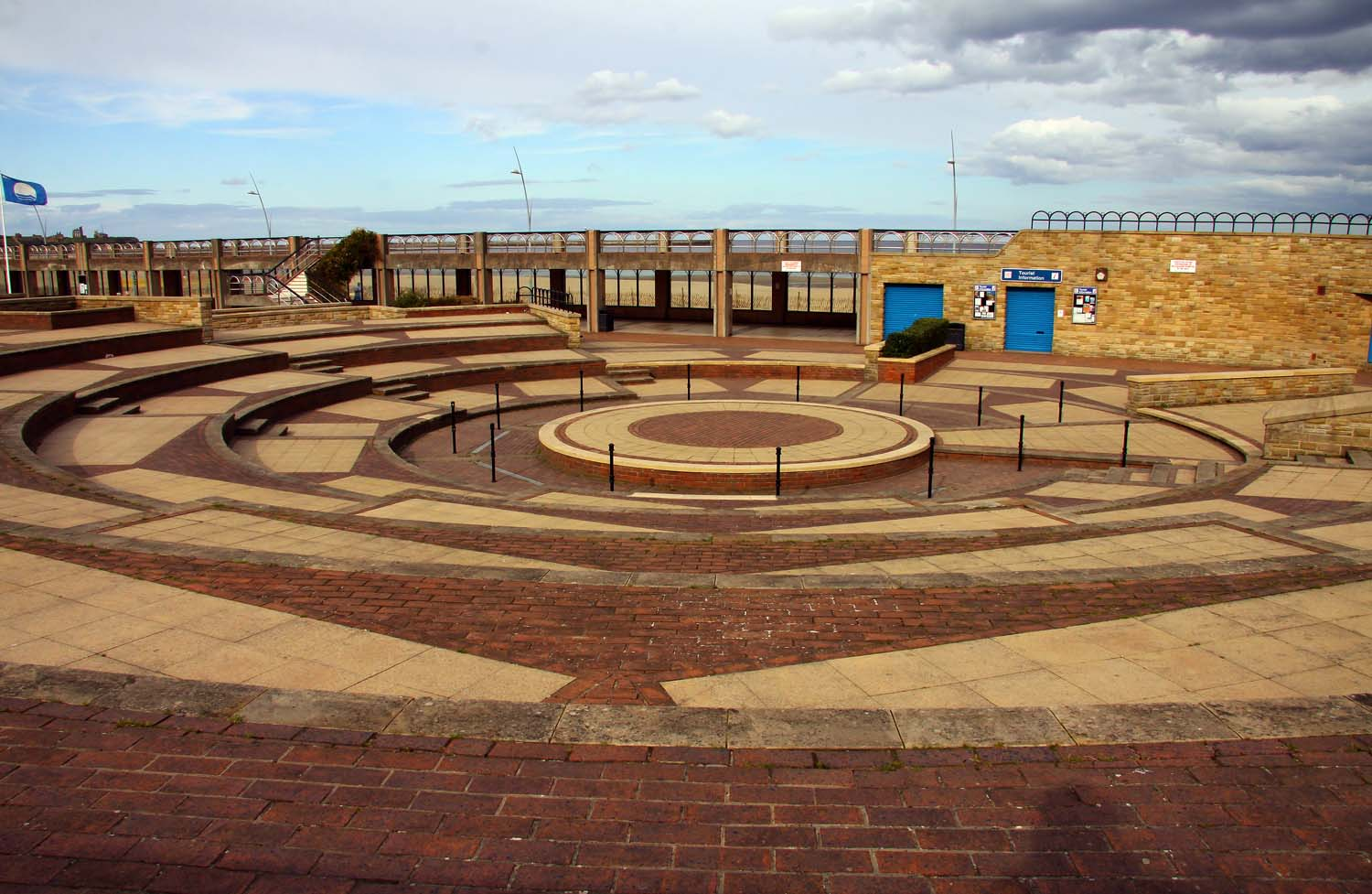
The amphitheatre

The town is a popular seaside resort with multiple landmarks and tourist attractions. As with other resorts tourism is a large part of the town's economy: to attract tourists the town has an extensive network of cycle paths and walking trails; a promenade; parks-and-gardens; fairground rides; amusement arcades, crazy golf, laser tag, a miniature steam railway; boating lake; a ten-pin bowling centre and an amphitheatre. There is a variety of restaurants, cafes, public houses and nightlife, as well as hotels, guest houses and caravan parks in and around the town.

South Shields plays host to an annual free summer festival and each autumn the town is the seaside finish to the Great North Run, as well as public gala shows at the Customs House. During the week is the Magic Convention – 3 days of lectures and shows by the world's best magicians.

== Landmarks ==
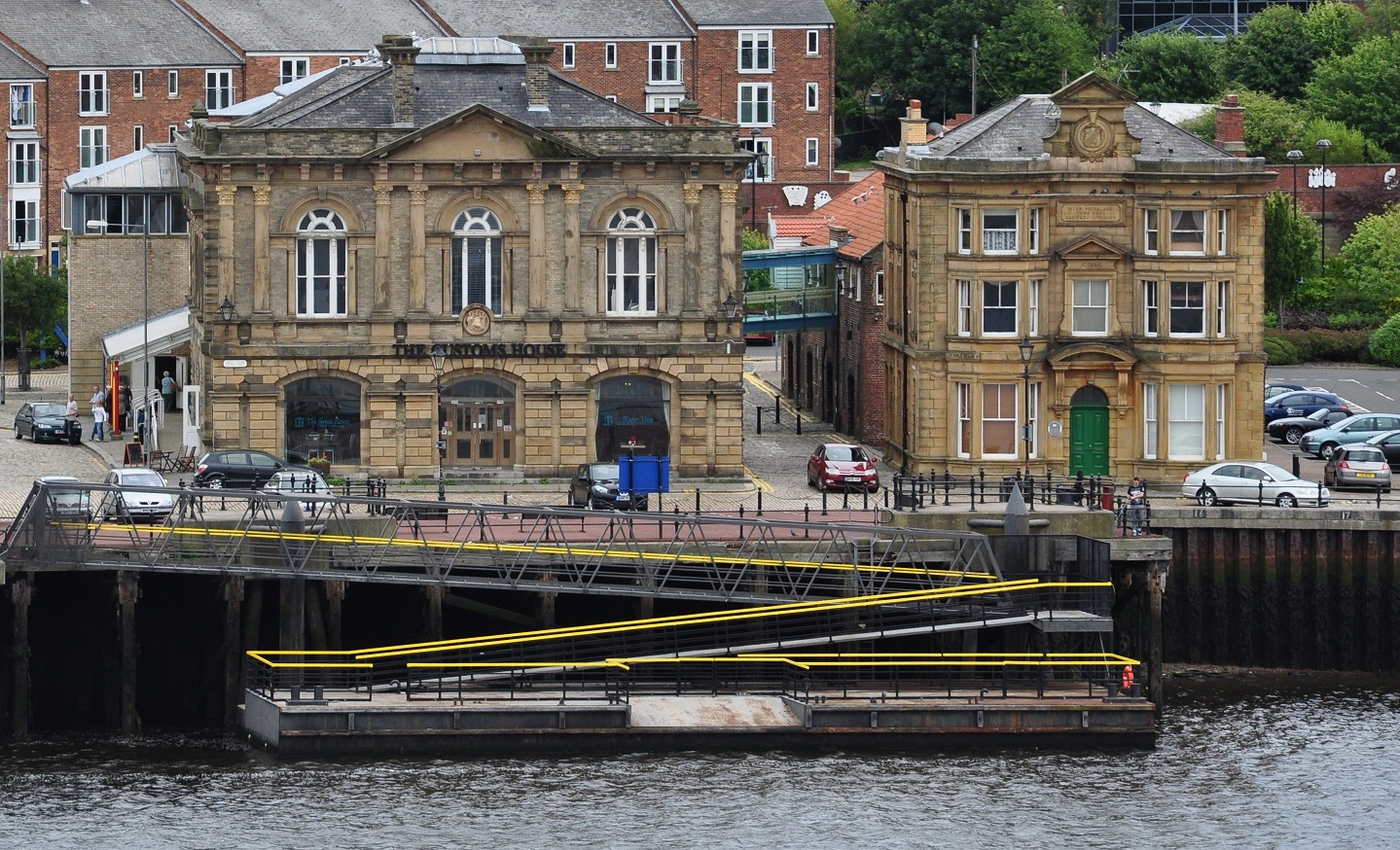
The Customs House Theatre

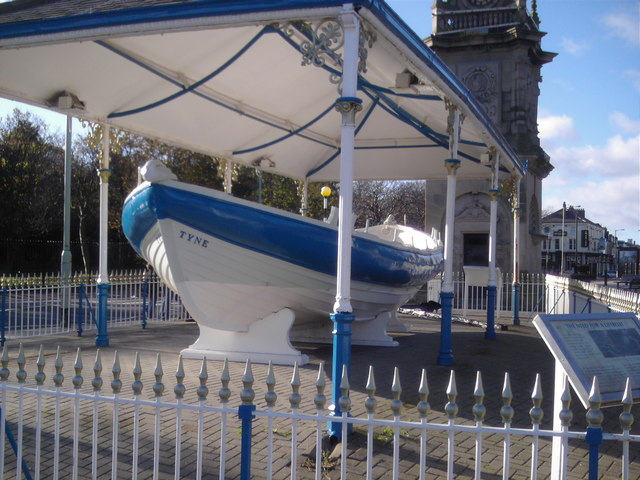
Tyne lifeboat of 1833

A notable landmark in the town is the reconstructed Roman fort and excavations of the ancient Arbeia Roman Castra; this form part of the Hadrian's Wall World Heritage Site. South Shields is also home of the oldest provincial newspaper in the UK, the Shields Gazette.

The town's museum & art gallery, includes a permanent exhibition dedicated to the life and times of Catherine Cookson. From 1985 to 2009, the area marketed itself as Catherine Cookson Country, which attracted many visitors.

There are several trade-related landmarks, including the headquarters, warehouse and factory of the fashion company Barbour; the Customs House theatre and arts venue; and the historic Mill Dam riverside. The town hosts traditional, continental and farmers' markets and has high street of shops.

Geographical landmarks include The Leas cliff tops and Haven Point as well as the bays of Littlehaven, Sandhaven and Marsden.

Notable buildings in and around the town include:

- St Hilda's Church, thought to be built on the site of Hilda's seventh-century chapel
- The combined Jubilee Clocktower and Wouldhave Memorial, which stands on Pier Parade alongside "Tyne", Britain's second-oldest preserved lifeboat.
- The National Trust-owned Souter Lighthouse.

=== Lighthouses and pier ===
Tyne South Pier light
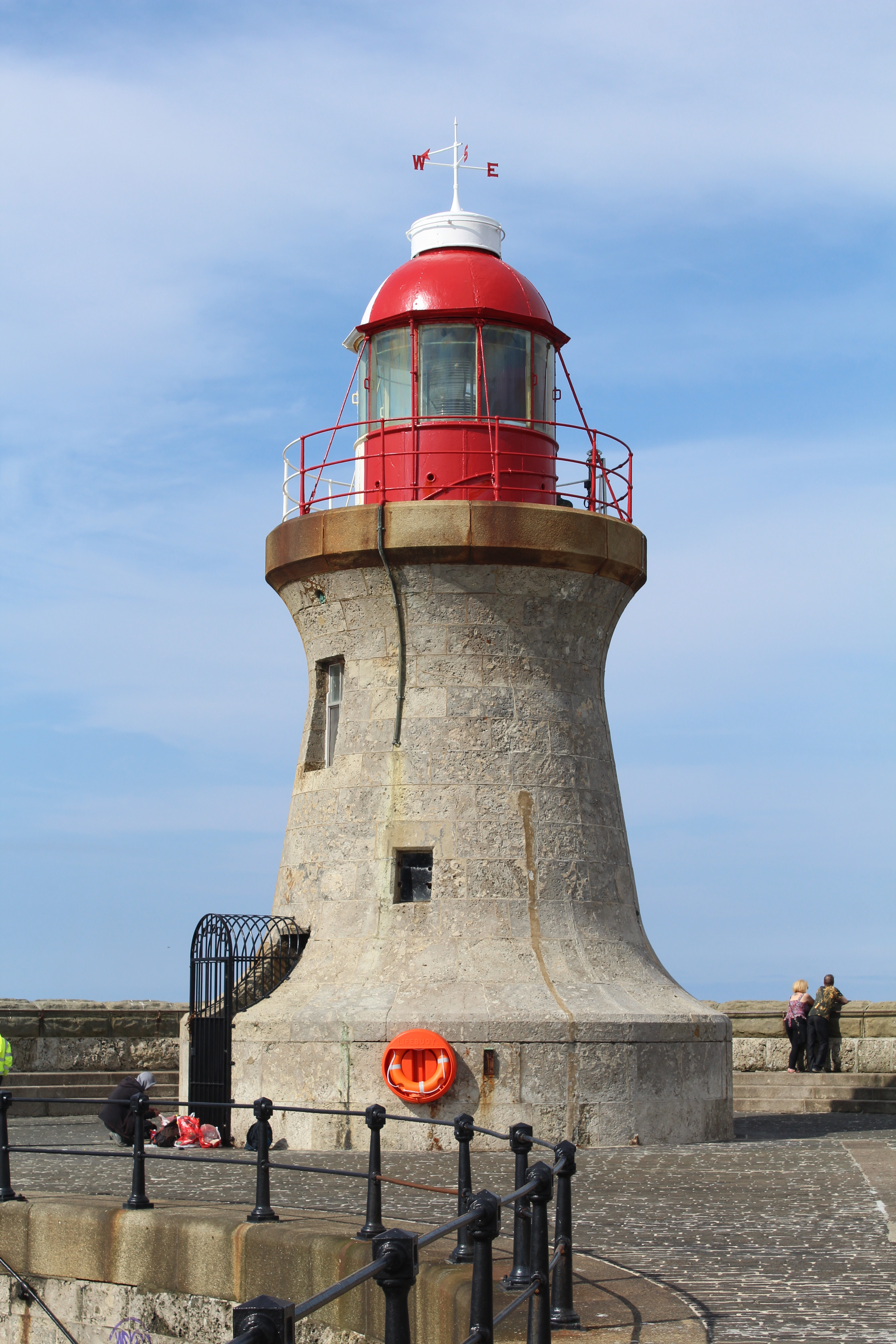
- Location: South Shields
- Coordinates: 55.011208°N 1.400980°W

Tower
- Constructed: 1895
- Construction: stone tower
- Height: 12 metres (39 ft)
- Shape: tapered cylindrical tower with balcony and lantern
- Markings: unpainted tower, white half lantern, red half lantern
- Operator: Port of Tyne
- Fog signal: bell every 10s

Light
- First lit: 1895
- Focal height: 15 metres (49 ft)
- Range: white: 13 nmi (24 km; 15 mi) red: 9 nmi (17 km; 10 mi) green: 8 nmi (15 km; 9.2 mi)
- Characteristic: Oc WRG 10s.

Herd Groyne Light
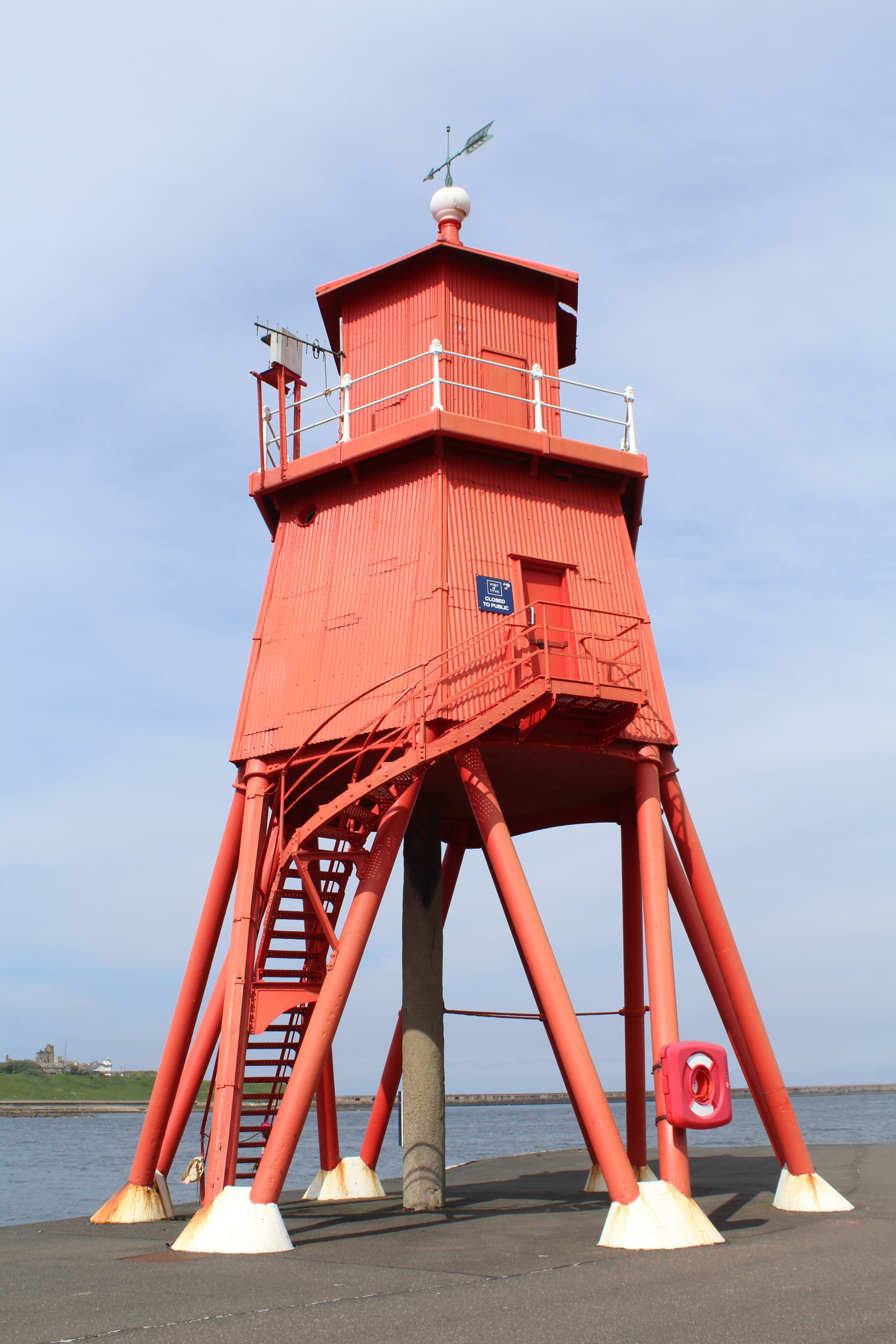
- Location: South Shields, South Tyneside, United Kingdom
- OS grid: NZ3684368285
- Coordinates: 55.008021°N 1.424082°W

Tower
- Constructed: 1882
- Construction: metal skeletal tower
- Height: 15 metres (49 ft)
- Shape: hexagonal frustum skeletal tower with observation room, balcony and lantern
- Markings: red tower and lantern
- Operator: Port of Tyne
- Heritage: Grade II listed building
- Fog signal: bell every 5s.

Light
- Focal height: 15 metres (49 ft)
- Range: white: 19 nmi (35 km; 22 mi) red and green: 11 nmi (20 km; 13 mi)
- Characteristic: Oc WRG 10s.

Work on the North and South Tyne Piers was begun in 1854 by the newly formed Tyne Improvement Commission, for the protection of shipping entering and leaving the river. The principal architect and engineer was James Walker, until his death in 1862 (whereupon John F. Ure took over). Construction was delayed by storm damage in 1862, which led to parts of the foundations having to be rebuilt. The South Pier was finished in 1895 and its lighthouse was operational that same year (it was equipped with a third-order fixed optic and a clockwork occulting mechanism, by Chance Brothers & Co.).

The lighthouse currently displays an occulting sector light with white, red and green sectors; the green sector is used to indicate safe waters near the coast to the north of Tynemouth, while red indicates an area with numerous wrecks to the east and south of the lighthouse. The pier is 5,150 ft (1,570 m) long (accessible from South Shields seafront, it is open to the public except in bad weather).

It was originally intended that the North (Tynemouth) Pier and lighthouse would mirror their South Shields counterparts, but a series of breaches and collapses meant that the North Pier was completed much later and to a different design. Following completion of the North Pier, in January 1908 the South Pier Lighthouse was provided with a bell, which sounded once every thirty seconds during foggy weather (in contrast to the reed fog horn sounded from the North Pier light).

On 20 October 2023, Storm Babet hit the North East Coast with high winds. The South Pier Lighthouse lost its dome, lantern and optic due to waves breaching the pier wall. The pier parapet was also severely damaged. Twelve months later a new dome and lantern were installed on the lighthouse.

There is a third lighthouse, just upstream of the pier, on the Herd Groyne at South Shields (which was constructed in 1861–67 to preserve Littlehaven Beach, then known as Herd Sands, which had begun to be washed away by the change of currents caused by the new piers). This very unusual lighthouse resembling a 1940s sci-fi movie space craft was built by Newcastle-upon-Tyne Trinity House in 1882 (ownership was passed to the Tyne Improvement Commission the following year). It consists of an upper hexagonal part (including the lantern) of wood and corrugated iron construction, sitting on twelve cylindrical steel legs. The whole structure is painted red and stands 49 ft (15 m) in height. The Groyne shows an occulting light which marks a safe entrance course between the piers, showing white to a vessel approaching from seaward on the correct course, green to a vessel off-course to the north, and red to one off-course to the south.

In 1928, both the South Pier and the Groyne lights were converted from incandescent gas to automatic electric operation. They were run off mains electricity (the gas lights being retained as an emergency standby). At the same time each lighthouse was equipped with an electrically activated fog bell; these were switched on and off remotely from a control hut in the pier blockyard. In the event of a power cut, each bell was designed to keep ringing for a further six hours. In 1961 the Commissioners installed a groundbreaking system by which the two fog bells would be switched on and off by the keepers on duty in the Tynemouth Pier lighthouse, using an 'infra-red ray' beamed across the river. This was in turn replaced by a radio link to an automatic fog detector when the latter lighthouse was automated in 1967. At the same time the South Shields lights were themselves fully automated, with the addition of standby diesel alternators and automatic lamp changers.

In 1999, the white sector of the light was intensified by the addition of a PEL sector light above the optic, with the same occulting characteristic but a range of 19 nautical miles (rather than 13, as previously). The installation of this powerful light (which is visible during the day as well as by night), rendered the High and Low Lights of North Shields redundant, and they were therefore decommissioned at the same time. The Herd Groyne lighthouse was refurbished and repainted in 2014, and again (with support from the Barbour Foundation) in 2024.

Both lighthouses continue to act as navigational aids to ships entering the River Tyne, though in 2015 it was stated that the fog bells on the two lighthouses were no longer operational. Port of Tyne (as successor to the Tyne Improvement Commission) has been 'custodian' of the lighthouses and pier since 1968.

=== Town halls ===
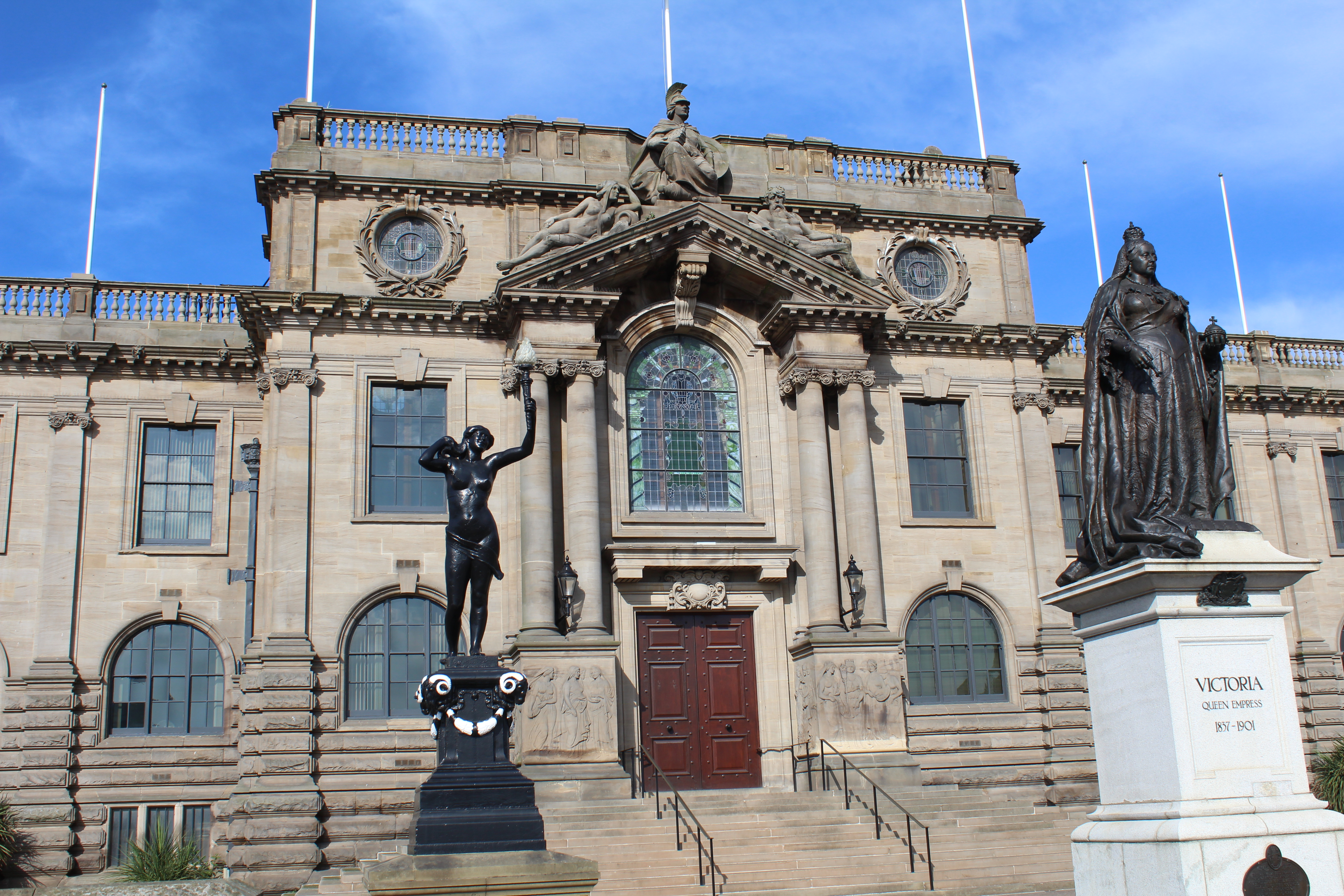
South Shields Town Hall, built at a time of industrial self-confidence

A prominent landmark is South Shields Town Hall, built 1905–1910, a sumptuous building "the most convincing expression in the county of Edwardian prosperity". The architect was E. E. Fetch of London. Ornamentation includes several references to the town's nautical heritage: Britannia and other sculpted figures in the pediment above the front entrance, a figure of Mercury atop a globe on the dome of the Council chamber, fountains and nymph lampholders in the forecourt alongside a statue of Queen Victoria. The 145-foot clock tower contains a Potts chiming clock and five bells, and is topped by a weathervane in the shape of a galleon.

The Old Town Hall, a square building of 1768, provides the centrepiece of the Market Place and closes the vista along King Street. The ground floor is open with arches on each side (and a central pillar which predates the rest of the structure); the enclosed first floor has pitched roof, topped by a wooden bell turret. Originally built and used by the Dean and Chapter of Durham, it was sold by them to the town Corporation in 1855.

== Education ==
South Shields is home to South Tyneside College, one of the two leading maritime training centres in the UK; it has facilities including a marine safety training centre and a simulated ship's bridge for the training of deck officers. The college was also home to the only planetarium in the region, and to an observatory; and in its time was a popular visitor attraction for local schools and visitors in general. The observatory was used for 20 years and in 2008 it was deemed redundant to the future curriculum needs of the college. The domed room that housed the planetarium is now a mosque. The college provides a wide range of other flexible vocational and training courses.

Local schooling is generally regarded as being very good, which is reflected in continuing improvements to school results and independent inspections.

In 2007, Brinkburn Comprehensive and King George V Comprehensive merged forming South Shields Community School. The new school was built at a cost of £19 million on the King George V School site and was opened in September 2011. However this school closed in 2020.

St Mary's C of E primary school was a Christian voluntary aided school educating children aged 3–11 located in South Shields. The school was founded in 1867 to provide education for the children of the labouring and manufacturing and poorer classes, with regard to the principles of the established church of the same name which was affiliated with the school. This school closed July 2008. Demolition of the school began early October 2016 and was finalised late November 2016.

== Regional identity ==
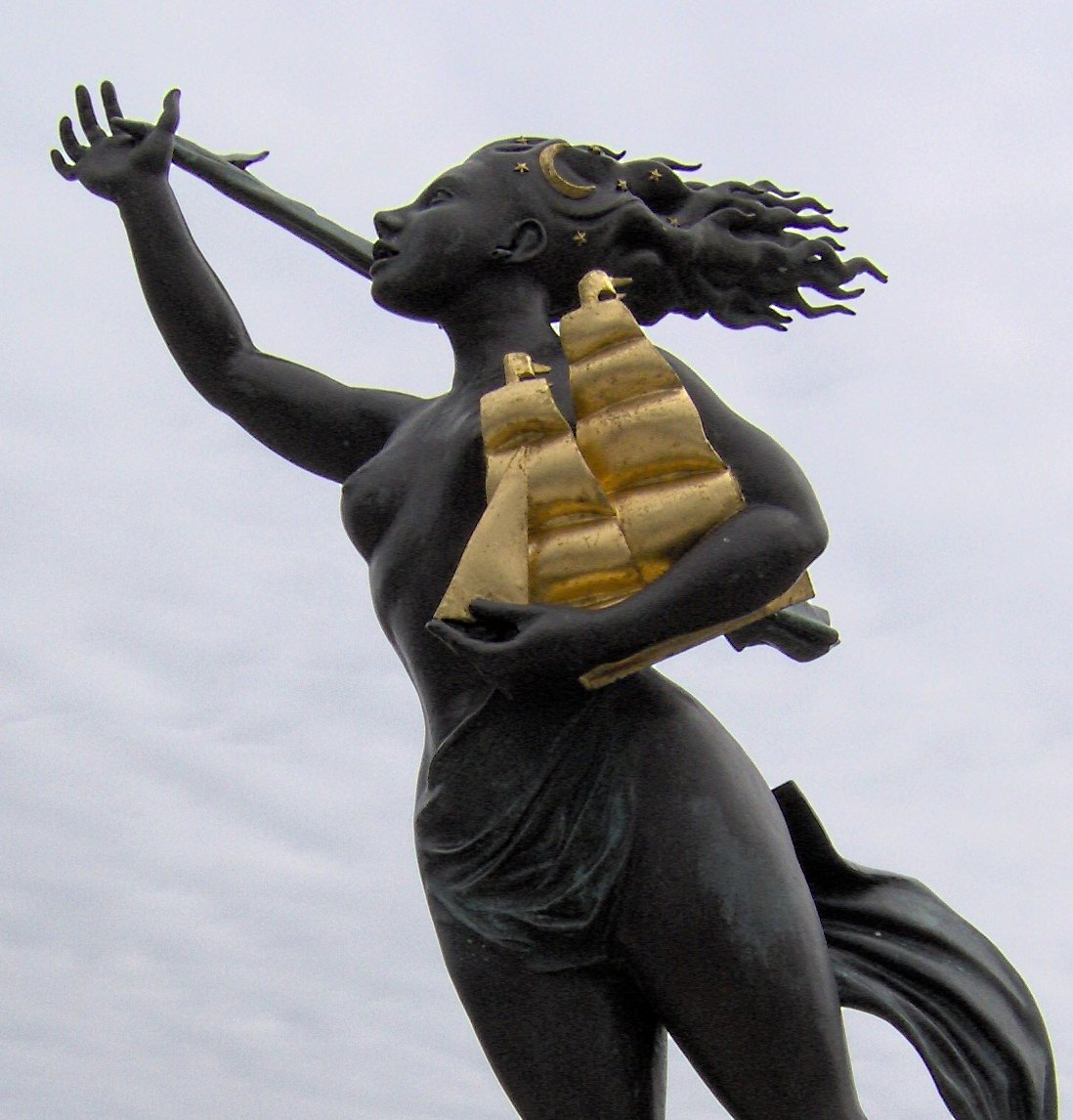
The 1998 sculpture Spirit of South Shields, by Irene Brown, embodies the town's maritime heritage. It overlooks the mouth of the Tyne.

People born in South Shields are considered to be Geordies, a term commonly associated with all residents of Tyneside.

A less commonly used colloquial term is Sandancer. It is presumed to originate from the town's beach and history.

== Transport ==
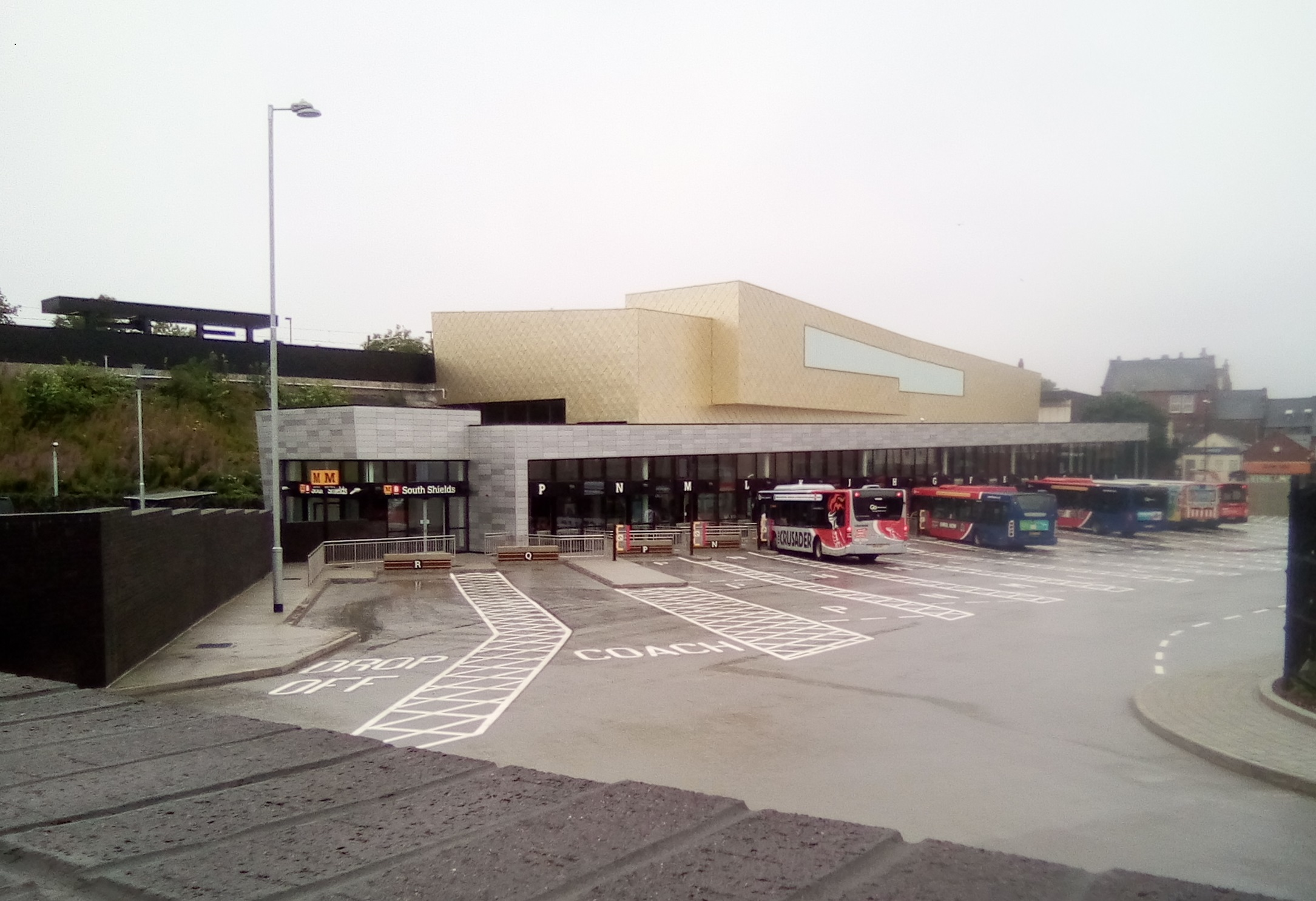
South Shields Interchange

=== Metro ===
The Tyne and Wear Metro light rail system was introduced in the 1980s, replacing British Rail services over the same route. The Metro network serves South Tyneside, Gateshead, Newcastle, North Tyneside, Sunderland and Newcastle Airport. South Shields metro station is the south-eastern terminus of the Yellow line; Nexus operates a regular service to Gateshead, Central Station, Tynemouth, North Shields and St James.

The new integrated bus and Metro interchange opened on 4 August 2019 on Keppel Street - across the road from the original Metro station at King Street - on the site of the former head post office and Royal Mail delivery office.

When Metro services were introduced, the railway line at the former High Shields LNER station at Laygate was re-routed eastwards to the then-new Chichester Metro and bus interchange. The former South Shields LNER station was also closed and the Victorian buildings survived as a secondary entrance to the Metro station until they were demolished in 1998.

There are other Metro stations at Tyne Dock, Simonside and Brockley Whins. Long-term plans by Nexus to reopen the former Sunderland to South Shields line between Tyne Dock, Brockley Whins and East Boldon would create a direct rail service between South Shields and Sunderland, without the need for passengers to change trains at Pelaw in Gateshead. Nexus also plans to open two new stations at Harton and Cleadon, raising the number of metro stations within the town from four to six.

There are no National Rail stations within the town or in the surrounding borough.

=== Ferry ===
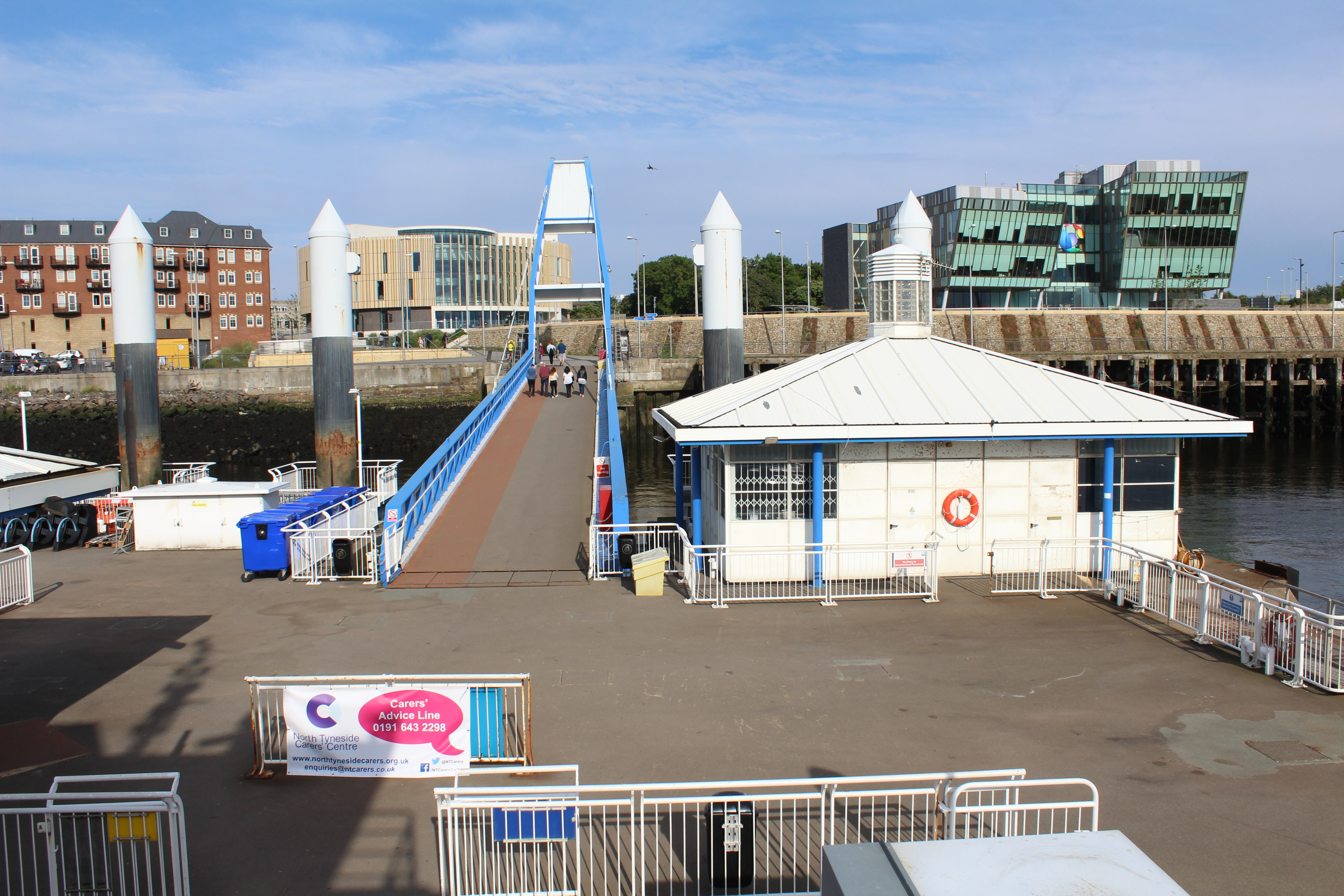
South Shields ferry terminal

There is a frequent pedestrian ferry service to North Shields on the opposite bank of the Tyne. The Shields Ferry carries tens of thousands of commuters and pleasure trippers each year. There has been a cross-river ferry service between the two towns since 1377.

=== Buses ===
Local bus routes are operated by Stagecoach North East and Go North East, which are planned to integrate with Metro services. There is a National Express coach service direct to London.

=== Roads ===
South Shields is bounded by the A19 trunk road to the West and situated close to the Tyne Tunnel at Jarrow. The town is well connected to other areas of Tyne & Wear and to the strategic road network – the A194(M) motorway provides a direct link between the Borough and the A1/A1(M).

=== Other ===
The Port of Tyne headquarters and international freight terminal are located at Tyne Dock in South Shields. The Port has a freight rail connection.

The town's extensive network of strategic footpaths and cycle routes includes the Sea to Sea Cycle Route and National Cycle Route 1.

== Sport ==
=== Football ===
South Shields F.C. is the town's main football team. Originally formed during the first decade of the 20th century, the team played in the Football League during the 1920s. The club recently shot to fame with a run to win the FA Vase in 2017. The side currently play in the National League North, after winning promotion to it in 2023, the sixth tier of English football. They also have a women's team who play in the fifth tier of the Women's pyramid, the North East Regional Women's League Premier Division.

Between the years of 1959–2019, the town were also represented by Harton & Westoe C.W. They played their games at the Harton & Westoe Miners Welfare near Whiteleas and spent the majority of their existence in the Wearside League before going out of existence in 2019.

=== Rugby ===
The town is home to two rugby union clubs:

- South Shields Rugby Football Club have been playing at Brinkburn, since 2015, having previously been based at Grosvenor Road, South Tyneside College since they were formed in 1956. Their clubhouse is the Cleadon Social Club. They currently play in the Candy League Two North and compete in the Durham County Cups.
- Westoe RFC, formed in 1875, still play at their original ground, Wood Terrace. In 2005 they had an Intermediate Cup run and got to Twickenham but were beaten by Morley R.F.C. from Yorkshire. They rose to the fourth tier National League Two and now play in rugby's eighth tier, the Durham & Northumberland 2nd Division.

For two seasons, in 1902–03 and 1903–04, the town also had a semi-professional rugby league club, South Shields who played at Horsley Hill while the club competed on the second division of the Northern Union. The club was voted out of the league at the end of their second season and the club disbanded shortly afterwards.

== Notable people ==
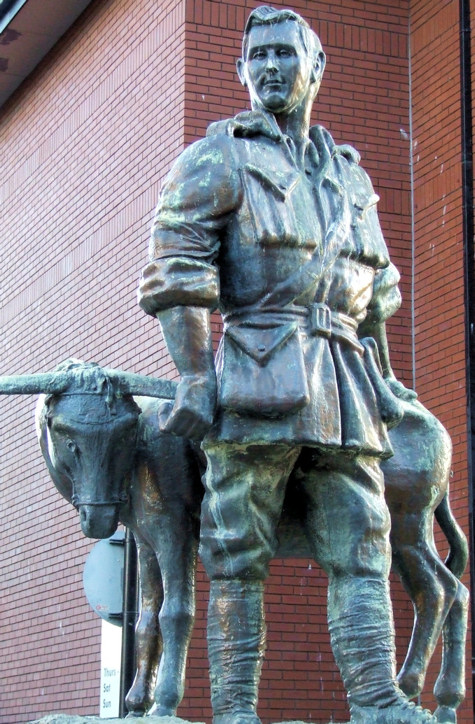
A statue of John Simpson Kirkpatrick, the lost son of the Gallipoli campaign in World War I, seen with his donkey. Sculpted by Robert Olley, it was unveiled in 1988 on Ocean Road by the Mayor, Councillor Albert Tate.

A number of notable people have been associated with South Shields. They include:

- Angelic Upstarts - punk band formed in South Shields in 1977.
- Michael Algar, a.k.a. Olga – guitarist, singer and songwriter with band The Toy Dolls
- Kane Avellano – long-distance motorcycle rider with the Guinness World Record for youngest person to circumnavigate the world by motorcycle (solo and unsupported) at the age of 23 in 2017
- William Reid Blyton – Labour MP and member of the House of Lords
- Elinor Brent-Dyer – children's author
- Phil Brown – former manager of Preston North End F.C.
- Jack Brymer – clarinettist
- Robert Colls - Historian
- Catherine Cookson – author
- Josef Craig – paralympic swimmer and gold medal winner at the 2012 Summer Paralympics
- Tom Curry – former Newcastle United player and Munich air disaster victim
- Dorfy – dialect author and journalist
- Martin Durkin – director
- Perrie Edwards and Jade Thirlwall - singers and performers - members of record-setting girl group Little Mix, winner of the eighth series of The X Factor; Thirlwall originates from the Yemeni community in Laygate
- Christie Elliott, professional footballer for Partick Thistle.
- Eva Elwes (1876–1950), actor, playwright and manager of Alexandra Theatre, South Shields
- John Erickson – historian and UN advisor
- Sir William Fox – politician who was Prime Minister of New Zealand four times in the 1800s
- Steve Furst – comedian
- Professor John Gray – philosopher
- Derek Hutchinson, British sea kayaker, author and designer
- Eric Idle – comedian, actor and songwriter
- Lulu James – singer
- John Simpson Kirkpatrick – ANZAC war hero
- Joe McElderry – singer and X Factor winner
- Sarah Millican – comedian
- Tish Murtha – photographer
- Dan Neil – professional footballer and captain of Sunderland AFC
- Robert Olley – artist and sculptor, creator of the painting "The Westoe Netty"
- David Phillips – chemist
- Chris Ramsey – comedian, podcaster
- Rosie Ramsey – comedian, podcaster
- Flora Robson – Oscar-nominated actress
- Claire Rutter – leading operatic soprano
- Ridley Scott − film director
- Sermstyle – remixer
- Demi Stokes - footballer, won the 2022 women's Euros with the Lionesses
- Ernest Thompson Seton - author and wildlife artist
- Martyn Waghorn – professional footballer, currently playing for Derby County
- Ginger Wildheart – Wildhearts singer and guitar
- Frank Williams – founder and manager of Williams F1 Formula One team
- Dave Wilson – England rugby union international
- Edward Wilson - Stage and screen actor, and second artistic director of the National Youth Theatre
- John Woodvine – stage, screen and radio actor
- William Wouldhave – creator of the lifeboat
- Gary Young – screenwriter and director of Harry Brown.
- Eileen O'Shaughnessy – wife of George Orwell.

== Gallery ==
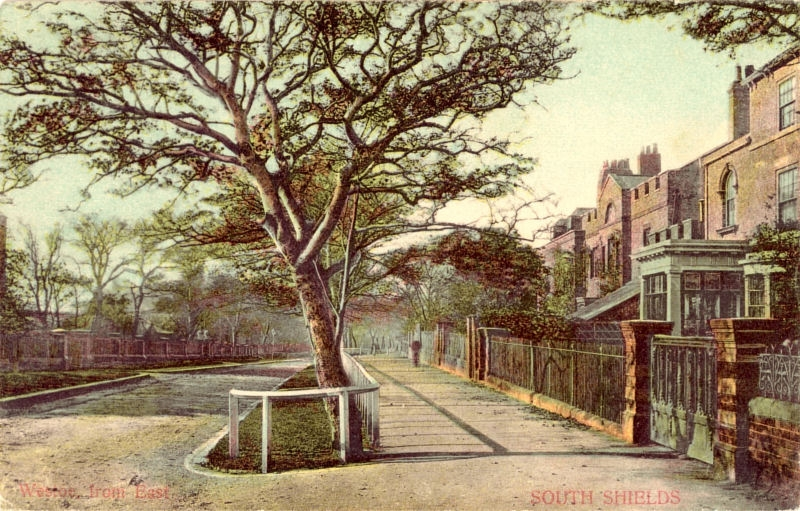
Westoe village 1904

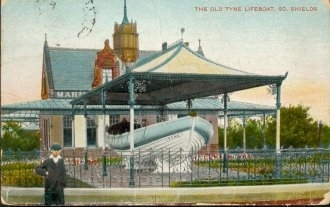
The retired Tyne life boat in 1904; A tribute to all crewmen who served on her, some mistakenly think this is a tribute to William Wouldhave

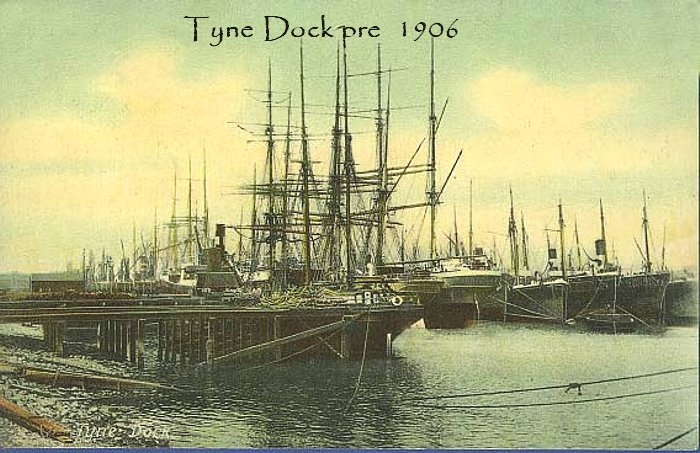
River Tyne Docks in 1906

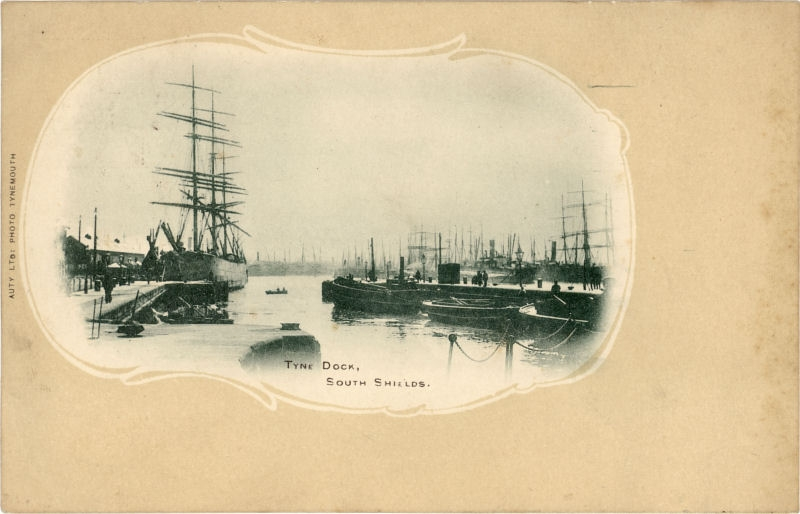
Tyne Docks in 1902

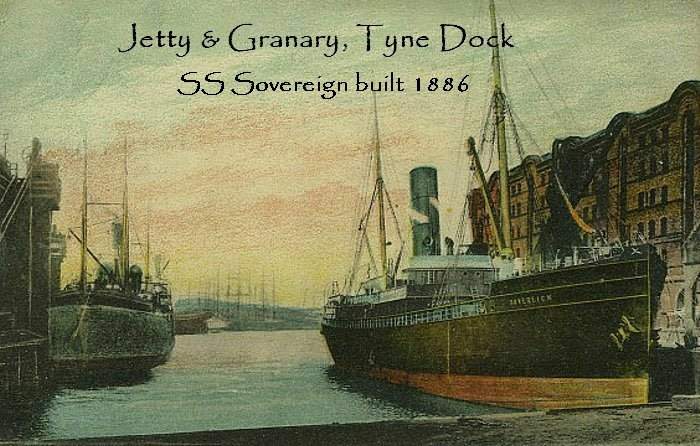
Tyne Docks in 1886

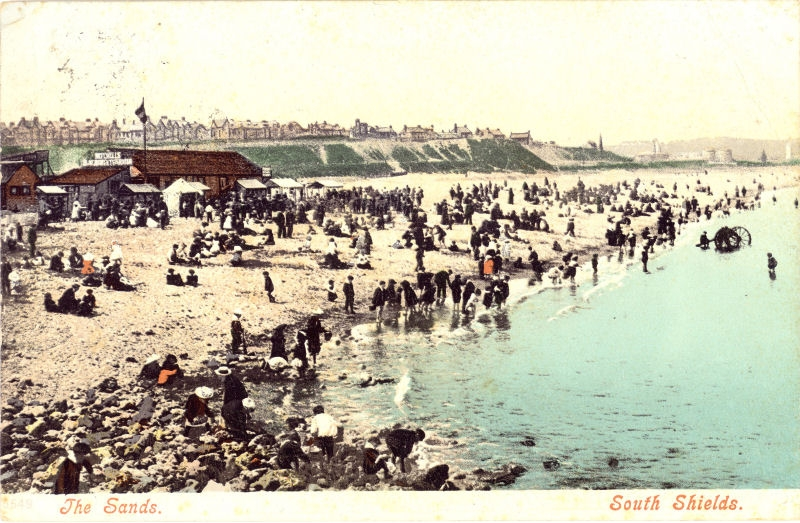
Sands at South Shields in 1903

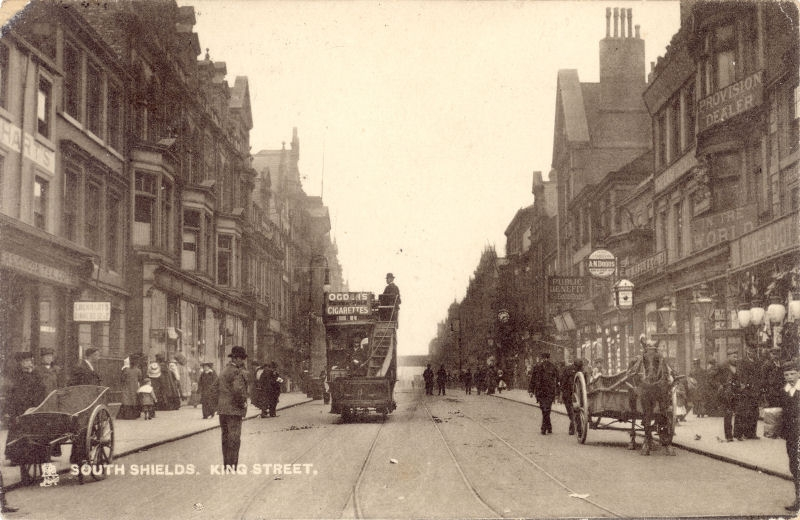
King Street in 1905

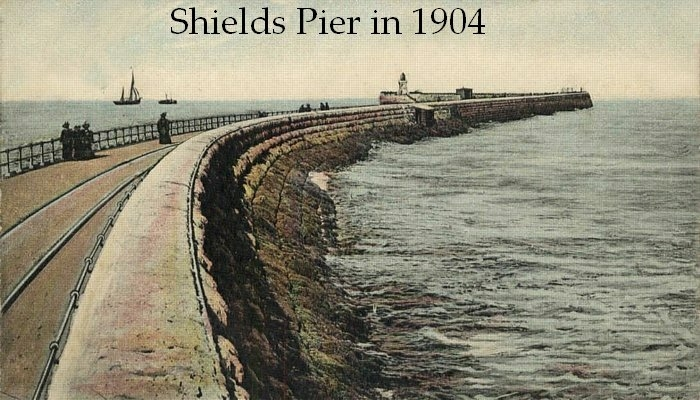
South Shields Pier in 1904

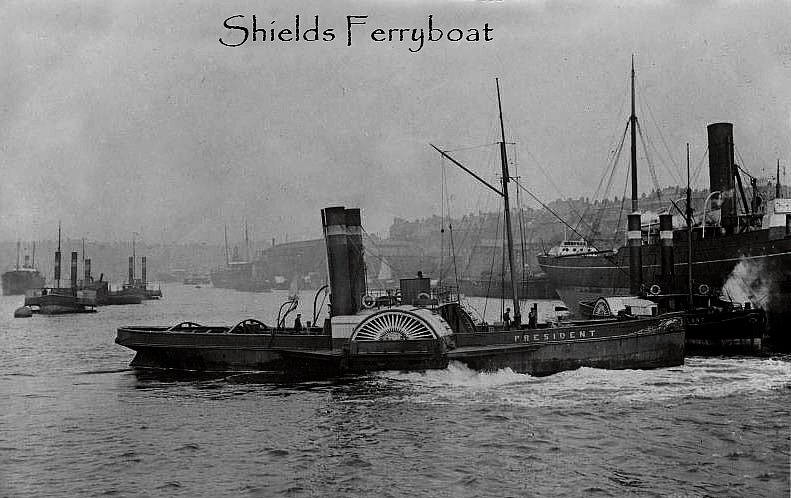
Early 1900s Tyne Ferry Boat

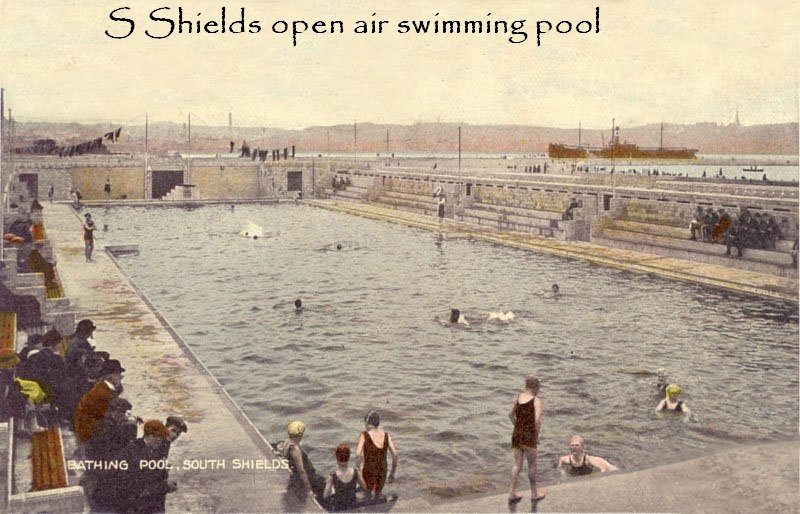
South Shields once had an open-air swimming pool

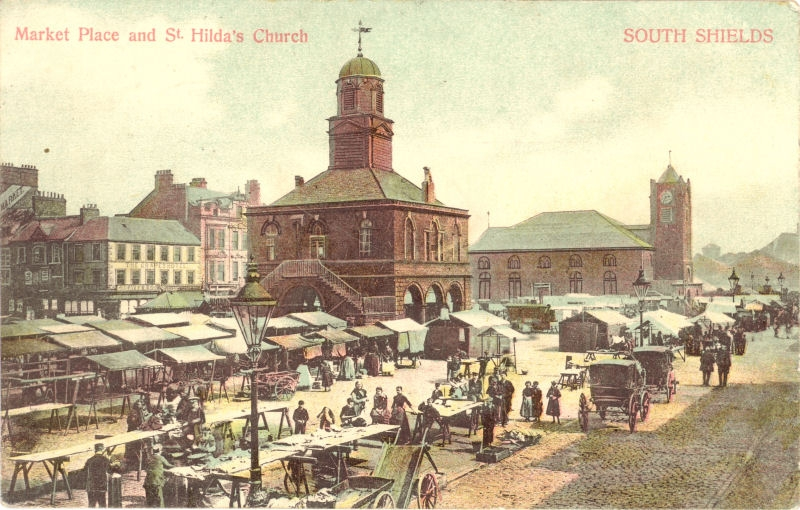
Market Place in 1904

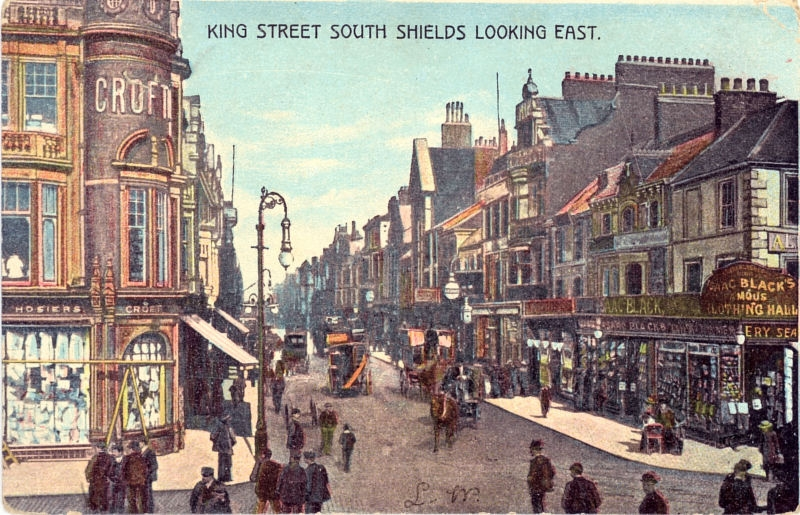
King Street in 1906

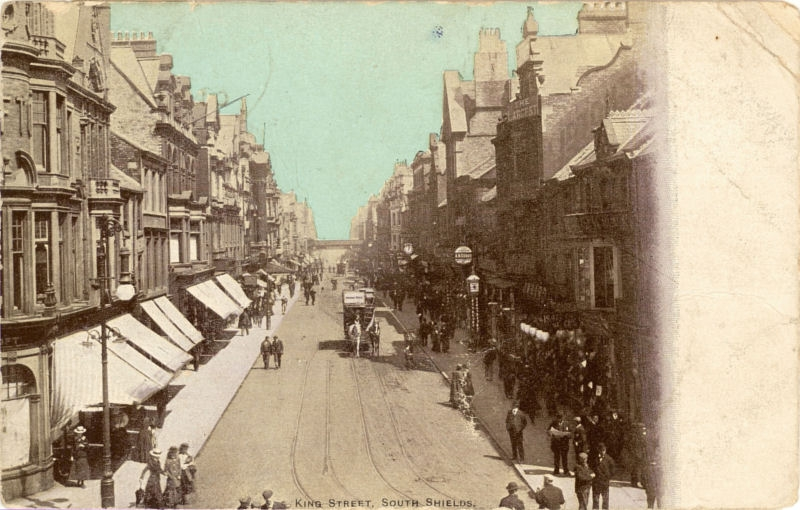
King Street in 1904

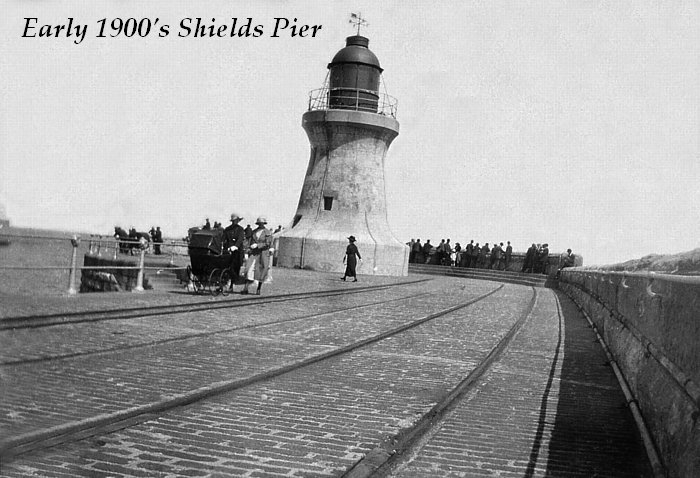
Early 20th century South Shields Pier

== See also ==
- South Shields (UK Parliament constituency)
- North Shields
- Trolleybuses in South Shields
- List of people from South Shields
- South Shields power station
- St Bede's Church, South Shields
