= Chichester Station =

Chichester Station may refer to:

- Chichester railway station, in Chichester, West Sussex, England
- Chichester Metro station, Chichester, Tyne and Wear, England
- Chichester Railroad Station, in New York state
