= West Harton =

- Location in Tyne and Wear
- Coordinates: 54.972°N 1.443°W
- OS grid reference: NZ357643
- Sovereign state: United Kingdom
- Country: England
- District: Tyne and Wear

West Harton is an area of the town of South Shields, in Tyne and Wear, England. It is primarily a residential area, with several schools and leisure facilities, including St Wilfrid's College and Brinkburn Recreation Ground. South Tyneside District Hospital is also situated in the area.

It is served by both the Tyne Dock Metro station and the Simonside Metro station on the Tyne and Wear Metro.
