= South Shields Rugby Football Club =

English rugby union club, based in South Shields, Tyne and Wear

South Shields RFC
- Full name: South Shields RFC
- Union: Durham County RFU
- Founded: 1956; 70 years ago
- Location: South Shields, Tyne and Wear, England
- Ground: Brinkburn
- Chairman: Gary McKay
- Coach: Lee Mckeith
- Captain: Tom McManemy
- League: Candy League Two North

Official website
- www.pitchero.com/clubs/southshieldsrfc

South Shields Rugby Football Club (commonly referred to as South Shields RFC), are an amateur rugby union club based in South Shields, North East England. They currently play in the Candy League Two North division run by local counties. They also compete in the Durham County cups.

== History ==
South Tyneside College Rugby union Football Club (STC RUFC) was established in 1956. The club were previously known as South Shields Marine Technical College Rugby Union Football Club (SSMTC RUFC) and at this point had the longest rugby club name in the entire country.

When the club were created they took the name from the college of further education at which it has been based ever since. As SSMTC RUFC the rugby rugby formed part of the offer made to students of the college, predominately for extra-curricular activities and was organised by staff from the college and linked to the activities of the Students' Association.

Throughout the years the rugby has continued to provide opportunities for training in as well as social and competitive engagement in the sport of rugby union

In 2005/06, under the stewardship of Paul Paterson, the club won the Durham & Northumberland Four. In 2006/07, the club finished a disappointing 10th in its first season in Durham & Northumberland three however went on to win the Durham County Plate two seasons running.

The 2010/11 season saw the club narrowly lose to Newton Aycliffe in the final of the Durham County Plate.

In 2012, facing the threat of extinction, the club was reformed and completely restructured under club captain Chris Vacher, team manager Daniel McKay, and the newly appointed head coach Tom Brooks. McKay, who also played for the club, was subsequently recognised by Durham County RFU for his contribution to rebuilding the side. In this season, the club finished fourth in Durham/Northumberland Three.

The following season, Clayton Fox was named as Captain and STC went on to claim the 2013/14 Durham/Northumberland Three league title. The club were relegated the following season however bounced straight back in the 2015/16 season with another DN3 title.

In the summer of 2015, the club was rebranded and renamed to South Shields Rugby Football Club. It also became a limited company. At this time, the club badge, which we see today, was also created and used on strips and teamwear for the very first time. This badge pays homage to the towns shipbuilding and Marine School, as well as tributes to the famous life boat associated with the town, coal mining, and its links to the Roman Empire.

The 2017/18 season started with a new coaching team of Ross Radford and David Bains, however their reign was short lived with both leaving the club in the December of 2017. Jordan Wright saw out the season and the club claimed another league title.

After COVID, the club struggled for numbers and came close to folding, ultimately pulling out of league rugby before recovering. 2022/23 was another season with a new era. Jamie Everett, James Robinson and Lewis Wilson joined the club bringing new leadership and ideas. That season the side finished runners up in the River Aln league, prompting applied promotion to the River Blyth league. 2023/24 saw the club crowned River Blyth Champions also finishing runners up in the Durham County Cup losing a home final to Peterlee & Horden. In 2024/25, captained again by Lewis Wilson, the club won the Candy League Three.

Tom McManemy took over as captain in June 2026 ahead of a new season competing in the Candy League Two North

== First team ==
South Shields RFC have historically competed in the Durham/Northumberland RFU divisions however now compete in the Candy League Two North which is run by the Northumberland RFU. They also compete in the Durham County Cup competitions.

== Honours ==
=== Champions ===
- Durham/Northumberland Three: 2013/14, 2015/16, 2017/18
- Durham/Northumberland Four: 2005/06
- River Blyth League: 2023/24
- Candy League Three: 2024/25
- Durham County Plate: 2006/07, 2007/08
- Durham County Junior Cup: 2008/2009
- Durham County Shield: 2024/25

=== Runners Up ===
- River Aln League: 2022/23
- Durham County Plate: 2010/11
- Durham County Junior Cup: 2005/06, 2017/18

== Past captains ==
- Thomas McManemy 2026 - Present
- Lewis Wilson 2022–2026
- Daniel McKay 2018–2021
- Jordan Wright 2017–2018
- Clayton Fox 2013–2017
- Chris Vacher 2012–2013
- David Mackenzie 2006–2012
- Paul Paterson 2005–2006
- Michael Elsy 2004–2005
- Colin Kennedy 2003–2004
- Sean Gardner 2002–2003
- David Newall 2001–2002
- Billy Bell 2000–2001
- David Barker 1999–2000
- Gary McKay 1997–1999
- Peter Martin 1993–1997
- Colin Duffy 1992–1993
- Hugh Jones 1991–1992
- Terry Davison 1990-1991
- Missing Info 1988–1990
- Keith Stoddard 1986–1988
- Gordon McAlpine 1985–1986
- John Ramsay 1979–1985
- Tony Broughton 1977–1979
- Missing Info 1956–1976
