= South Shields Community School =

South Shields School

Location
- Nevinson Avenue; South Shields, Tyne and Wear, NE34 8BT; England
- Coordinates: 54.9737°N 1.4256°W

Information
- Type: Community school
- Closed: 2020
- Local authority: South Tyneside
- Department for Education URN: 131756 Tables
- Ofsted: Reports
- Gender: Coeducational
- Age: 11 to 16
- Enrolment: 785
- Website: http://www.sscschool.net/

South Shields Community School was a coeducational secondary school located in South Shields, Tyne and Wear, England, with pupils aged from 11 to 16.

The school was formed from the amalgamation of Brinkburn School and King George V School.

The school opened at the former Brinkburn School site in McAnany Avenue in South Shields in April 2007. The school is part of the South Tyneside and Gateshead Building Schools for the Future Programme and moved into a new £20M building on the site of the former King George V School in 2011.

From 2018 the school underwent a controlled closure which was completed at the end of the 2019/2020 academic school year.
