= Simonside Metro station =

Tyne and Wear Metro station in South Tyneside

Simonside
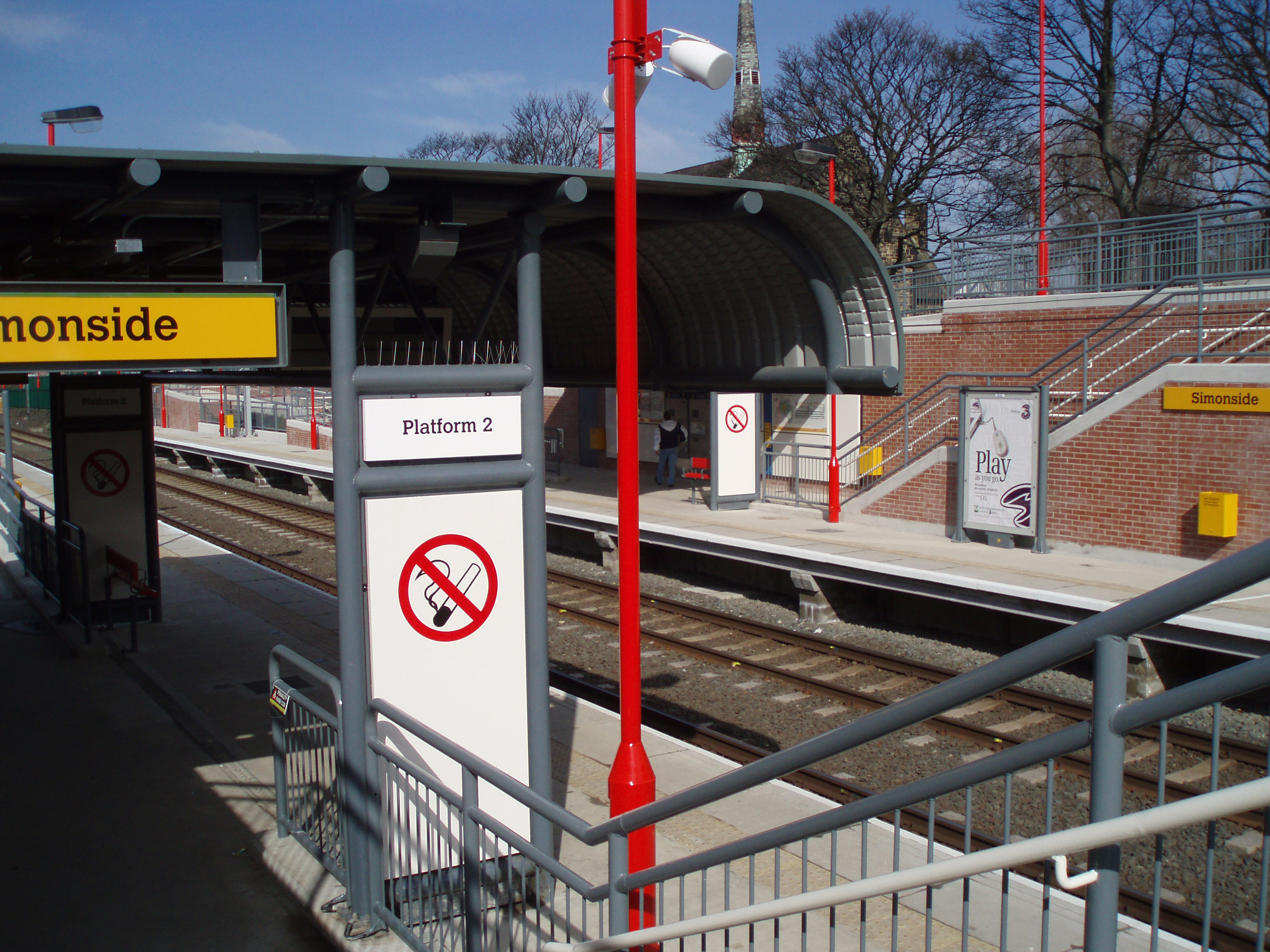

General information
- Location: West Harton, South Tyneside; England
- Coordinates: 54°58′18″N 1°27′20″W
- Grid reference: NZ349642
- System: Tyne and Wear Metro station
- Transit authority: Tyne and Wear PTE
- Platforms: 2
- Tracks: 2

Construction
- Cycle facilities: 2 cycle pods
- Accessible: Step-free access to platform

Other information
- Station code: SMD
- Fare zone: C

History
- Original company: Tyne and Wear Metro

Key dates
- 17 March 2008: Opened

Passengers
- 2024/25: 0.361 million

Services
Preceding station	Tyne and Wear Metro	Following station
Tyne Dock towards South Shields	Yellow line	Bede towards St James via Whitley Bay
Location
- Location within Tyne and Wear

Simonside is a Tyne and Wear Metro station, serving the suburb of West Harton, South Tyneside in Tyne and Wear, England. It joined the network on 17 March 2008.

== History ==
The station was constructed at a cost of £3.2 million, with original plans to open in January 2007. However, delays in planning and construction meant that the station opened later than planned, on 17 March 2008.

The decision to construct a station here was controversial, with the decision not universally welcomed by all local residents. There were concerns that the station's opening would lead to an increase in both crime and local road traffic.

== Facilities ==
Step-free access is available at all stations across the Tyne and Wear Metro network, with ramps providing step-free access to both platforms at Simonside. The station is equipped with ticket machines, waiting shelter, seating, next train information displays, timetable posters, and an emergency help point on both platforms. Ticket machines are able to accept payment with credit and debit card (including contactless payment), notes and coins. The station is also fitted with smartcard validators, which feature at all stations across the network.

There is no dedicated car parking available at the station. There is the provision for cycle parking, with two cycle pods available for use.

== Services ==
As of April 2021, the station is served by up to five trains per hour on weekdays and Saturday, and up to four trains per hour during the evening and on Sunday.
