= St Hilda's Church, South Shields =

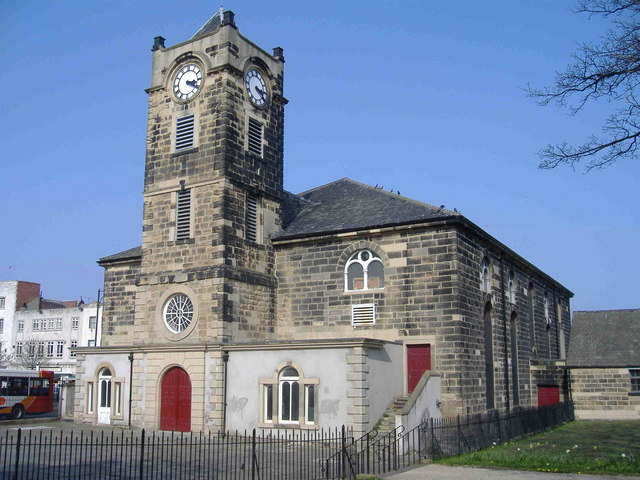
- St Hilda's Church, South Shields
- St Hilda's Church, South Shields
- 54°59′47.25″N 1°26′15.81″W
- OS grid reference: NZ 36105 67063
- Location: South Shields, Tyne and Wear
- Country: England
- Denomination: Church of England
- Churchmanship: Anglo-Catholic
- Website: Church website

History
- Status: Active

Architecture
- Functional status: Parish church
- Completed: 1811

Administration
- Diocese: Diocese of Durham
- Archdeaconry: Sunderland
- Deanery: Jarrow

St Hilda's Church, South Shields is a Grade II listed parish church in South Shields, Tyne and Wear, England. It is part of the Church of England.

== History ==
The church, the parish church of South Shields is said to be on the site of a chapel founded by Aidan of Lindisfarne circa AD 647 and placed in the charge of Hilda of Whitby. Some restoration work was carried out in 1675 by Robert Trollope. In 1753 a north aisle was added to the church. It was then mostly rebuilt between 1810 and 1881 and the interior galleries are supported on cast-iron columns. The rebuilding of the church incorporated the font of 1675 by Robert Trollop, and a gilt chandelier dating from 1802.

The church is most famous for the model of a lifeboat by William Wouldhave dating from 1802 which is suspended from the ceiling.

== Organ ==
In 1788 Donaldson of York built an organ for the west gallery, which was rebuilt by J. W. Walker in 1850.

The current organ is a fine instrument by Thomas Christopher Lewis, built in 1866. It was his first major build outside of London and includes a fine case designed by John Francis Bentley which measures 26 ft high, 13 ft wide and 18 ft in breadth. It was rebuilt and enlarged by five stops in 1904 by Nicholson & Lord. A full restoration was carried out in 2003/2004 by Harrison & Harrison. A specification of the organ can be found on the National Pipe Organ Register.

Ernest Farrar held the position of organist from March 1910 to August 1912.

A stone dated 1710 is in the grounds of St Hilda's Church.
