= William Wouldhave =

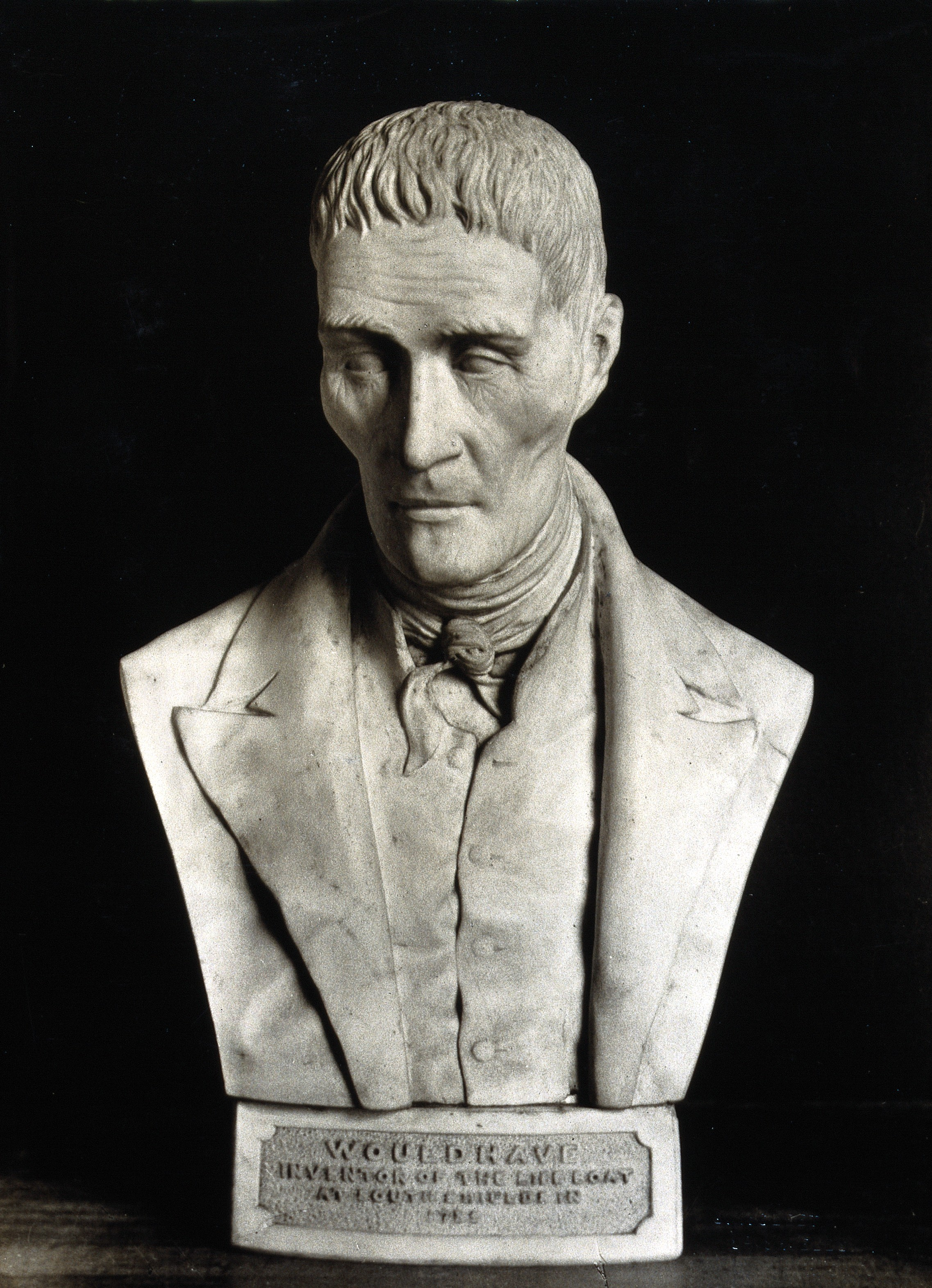
- Bust of William Wouldhave. Credit: Wellcome Library
- Born: 1751; Liddle Street, North Shields, England
- Died: 28 September 1821, in his 70th year
- Occupations: Clerk of the parish church of St Hilda's Church, South Shields, County Durham, England
- Known for: Lifeboat design

William Wouldhave (1751–1821) is a rival of Lionel Lukin for recognition as inventor of the lifeboat. His tombstone (erected thirteen years before Lukin’s) describes him as:

‘Inventor of that invaluable blessing to mankind the Lifeboat’.

== Personal history ==
William Wouldhave was born in Liddle Street, North Shields, Northumberland in 1751 and baptised in Christ Church then in the parish of Tynemouth. He was apprenticed as a house painter before moving to become parish clerk in South Shields. Wouldhave married Hannah Crow on 1 March 1775 at the parish church of St Hilda, South Shields. After his death a memorial was erected and that stone still exists (2010) in the former graveyard of St Hilda’s Church, South Shields.

== Invention of the lifeboat ==
He did not succeed with the practical application of his invention until 1789, three years after Lukin’s converted coble was presented to Dr Sharpe. In this year a competition was launched to reward any inventor who could provide a craft for the purpose of saving lives from a shipwreck. This following the tragic fate of the doomed Newcastle ship, the Adventure, that had gone aground near the coast at the mouth of the Tyne. From the shore, although the shipwreck clearly visible, little could be done to save the passengers and crew who were seen to be dropping from the rigging into the sea.

Wouldhave's boat was to be built of copper, made buoyant by the use of cork, and incapable of being capsized. Although it did not meet with full approval, Wouldhave was awarded one guinea for his trouble. Henry Greathead also made a submission, which was deemed to resemble a "butcher's tray", in that it was oblong and was a copy of a U.S. troop carrier, totally unsatisfactory for the short breaking seas of the North East Coast, he was however employed to build a boat designed by the committee, principally by Nicholas Fairles.

Wouldhave's claims to have invented the lifeboat were hampered by his poverty and violent language. Mr. Hailes, a mathematician familiar with marine architecture, supported Wouldhave's claim to the invention, and believed that the curved keel was an error. In a letter to the editor of The Monthly Magazine dated Feb.16,1807, Hailes says that around the time of Greathead's recognition in parliament in 1802, he had asserted Wouldhave's right to the invention, and invited Greathead to prove otherwise. He had not done so, apart from some letters to newspapers, and editors continued to present Greathead to the public as the inventor of the lifeboat. In 1806 Hailes published a pamphlet titled "An enquiry concerning the invention of the lifeboat". In July of that year a letter was published in the Gentlemans Magazine claiming the invention for Lukin.
