= Chichester Metro station =

Metro station in Tyne and Wear, England

Chichester
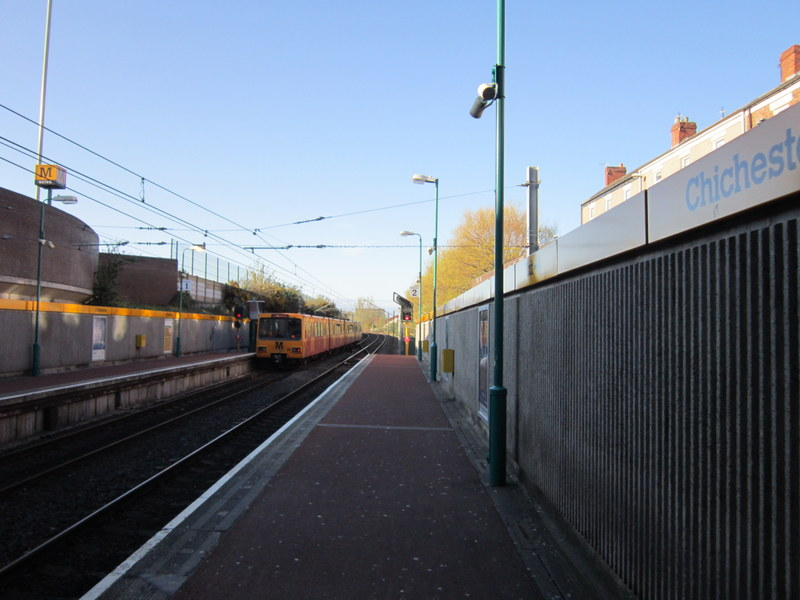

General information
- Location: South Shields, South Tyneside, England
- Coordinates: 54°59′11″N 1°25′55″W
- Grid reference: NZ364659
- System: Tyne and Wear Metro station
- Transit authority: Nexus
- Platforms: 2
- Tracks: 2

Construction
- Cycle facilities: 5 cycle pods
- Accessible: Step-free access to platform level

Other information
- Station code: CHI
- Fare zone: C

History
- Original company: Tyne and Wear Metro

Key dates
- 24 March 1984: Opened

Passengers
- 2024/25: 0.730 million

Services
Preceding station	Tyne and Wear Metro	Following station
South Shields Terminus	Yellow line	Tyne Dock towards St James via Whitley Bay
Location

Chichester (/ˈtʃaɪ.tʃɛstər/) is a station on the Tyne and Wear Metro, serving the Chichester, Laygate, Westoe and West Park areas of South Tyneside, in Tyne and Wear, England, as well as the nearby South Tyneside College campus. The station was used by approximately 730,000 passengers in 2024–25 and is affectionately referred to as "Chi" by locals.

== History ==
The Tyne and Wear Metro station at Chichester was opened in March 1984, and completed the initial Metro network. It was originally a station on the Green Line until 1991; since 2005, the station has been on the Yellow Line.

A statue of Queen Victoria had been moved to Chichester in 1949, from its original position in front of South Shields Town Hall. In 1981, it was removed to make way for the new station at Chichester and returned to its original position at the front of the Town Hall, where it remains today.

Chichester is situated on the former Stanhope & Tyne Railway route, rather than the former Brandling Junction Railway route via High Shields.

Part of this line had been transferred into National Coal Board ownership, and to the south of the station was a single-track electrified freight line, part of the Harton Colliery system. In the early 1990s, this line was de-electrified and following the closure of Westoe Colliery in 1993, has been closed completely.

The former colliery line along Chichester Road was regenerated in the late 1990s, being replaced with a supermarket. The line itself was also the spot of the Westoe Netty, an open air public urinal which was depicted in a famous 1972 painting by Bob Olley. These toilets were saved when the colliery line was demolished and are now preserved at the Beamish Open Air Museum in County Durham. In regards to the station, the colliery line ran behind platform 2 with the tunnel beneath the concourse still visible from the Dean Road bridge.

Chichester was intended as one of the original interchange stations, which meant buses were timetabled to interchange with Metro services. This arrangement broke down after the deregulation of local bus services in 1986. Today, Chichester still serves as one of the Metro's main bus interchanges, due to the close proximity of the Stagecoach North East bus depot, but now serves mainly for nearby residential areas and the South Tyneside College campus.

The platforms at Chichester are below street level, but the ticket hall is at ground level. The ticket hall contains two ticket machines and a newsagent. The station also houses four bicycle lockers.

Following the opening of the new South Shields Interchange in August 2019, Chichester is the single remaining station on the branch from Pelaw to South Shields which has yet to be refurbished.

In November 2014, two pieces of artwork produced by community group Bright Futures were installed in the station.

== Services ==
The station is served by up to five trains per hour on weekdays and Saturdays, and up to four trains per hour during the evening and on Sundays.
