= Peter Mortimer (writer) =

English writer (born 1943)

Peter Mortimer (born December 1943) is an English poet, playwright and journalist, as well as an editor and theatre director. He has been living in North-East England since 1970 and much of his work has been devoted to that area. However, a series of 'extreme' travelogues have given him a wider focus and made him known elsewhere. In 2001, he received a Northern Arts Award.

== Life and writing ==
After studying Economics at Sheffield University, Nottingham-born Mortimer trained as a journalist and eventually joined the staff of The Journal in Newcastle upon Tyne in 1970. Between 1973–97 he also edited the literary magazine Iron, as well as the associated and innovative Iron Press, which still continues publishing.

Mortimer's own writing has included poetry and fiction, but his main love has been drama. Since his first performed play in 1983, "Snow White in the Black Lagoon", he has written over thirty more which have been performed by a variety of local companies. Included among these companies is Cloud Nine, which he set up in 1979 as a vehicle for new writing by northern dramatists. He has written a great deal of theatre for the young, the best of which was collected in Playtime, Eight Plays for and with Young People (2011). Those were created initially in school workshops, an approach that Mortimer also took to the Shatila refugee camp, as documented in his Camp Shatila: a writer's chronicle (2009).

In his Shields Trilogy, Mortimer created three plays based on neglected characters from North Shields that he had researched. These included Death at Dawn (2014), following the story of William Hunter, who had enlisted underage and was executed for desertion in 1916; Rainbird: The Tragedy of an Artist (2018), dealing with the promising start of painter Victor Noble Rainbird, whose life was later ruined by his experience of World War 1; and Fire and Water: The Thomas Brown Story (2021), dramatizing his part in recovering the Enigma code books from a sinking German U-boat in 1942. These were preceded by the equally documentary Riot (2008), which dealt with the 1930 race riot in South Shields and was acted both locally and at the Liverpool Arabic Arts Festival.

Riot relates to Tyneside seamen, a special interest of Mortimer's since his The Last of the Hunters (1987), a documentary based round his experience of working on six separate fishing boats over a six-month period. But the writing of the play was also preceded by a research trip to Yemen, where Mortimer contacted some of the last people with connections to that event. The trip resulted in his travel book Cool for Qat (2005), which was the latest in a series of 'extreme' challenges he had been setting himself over the years and which earned for him a reputation outside the region. His Broke Through Britain: one man’s penniless odyssey (1999) covers his 27-day summer trek from Plymouth to Edinburgh with absolutely no money in his pocket, throwing himself entirely on people's generosity. Three years later he planned "a writer’s exile" on Lindisfarne between January and April 2001, with other challenges thrown in that included short periods cut off without shelter on an offshore skerry in imitation of the local Saint Cuthbert. His chronicle of this experience was published as 100 Days on Holy Island (2002).

== Bibliography ==
=== Poetry ===
- Waiting for History (Platform Poets, 1976)
- Utter Nonsense (Iron Press, 1979, 1986) ISBN 0906228271
- A Rainbow in Its Throat: New and Selected Poems (Flambard Press, 1993), ISBN 1873226055
- The Expanded Utter Nonsense (Iron, 2001), ISBN 9780906228838
- I Married the Angel of the North (Five Leaves Publications, 2002), ISBN 9780907123934

=== Fiction ===
- Croak, the King and a Change in the Weather: A Fable, (Flambard, 1997). ISBN 0906228638
- Uninvited, (Red Squirrel Press, 2010), novella. ISBN 1906700273
- Whistling Licence: Four Short Stories (Iron, 2021). ISBN 9781999763695

=== Plays ===
- Riot: South Shields 1930 – Britain's First Race Riot (Five Leaves, 2008). ISBN 190551249X
- Playtime: Eight Plays for and with Young People, (Flambard Press 2011). ISBN 9781906601270
- Death at Dawn: a soldier’s tale from the Great War (Red Squirrel Press, 2014). ISBN 1906700923
- Rainbird: The Tragedy of a Painter (Iron Press, 2018). ISBN 1999763610
- Fire & Water: The Thomas Brown Story (Iron Press, 2021). ISBN 1838344403

=== Documentaries ===
- The Last of the Hunters: Life with the Fishermen of North Shields (North Tyneside Libraries & Arts 1987; Five Leaves 2006, revised 2017). ISBN 9781905512218
- Broke Through Britain: one man's penniless odyssey, (Mainstream, two printings 1999). ISBN 184018163X
- 100 Days on Holy Island: a writer’s exile, (Mainstream, 2002). ISBN 1840184078
- Cool for Qat: A Yemeni Journey: Two Countries, Two Times, (Mainstream, 2005). ISBN 1840189460
- Off the Wall: the journey of a play (Five Leaves, 2007). ISBN 9781905512157
- Camp Shatila: a writer's chronicle (Five Leaves, 2009). ISBN 1905512805
- Made In Nottingham: a writer's return (Five Leaves, 2012). ISBN 1907869522

=== Journalism ===
- Mortimer at Large, (North Tyneside Libraries and Museums/Iron Press, 2008), weekly columns in the News Guardian series of newspapers on North Tyneside. ISBN 9780955245046
- Planet Corona: The First 100 Columns, as published in The Journal, Newcastle, (Iron Press, 2021). ISBN 0995457980
