= Tyne Dock Metro station =

Tyne and Wear Metro station in South Tyneside

Tyne Dock
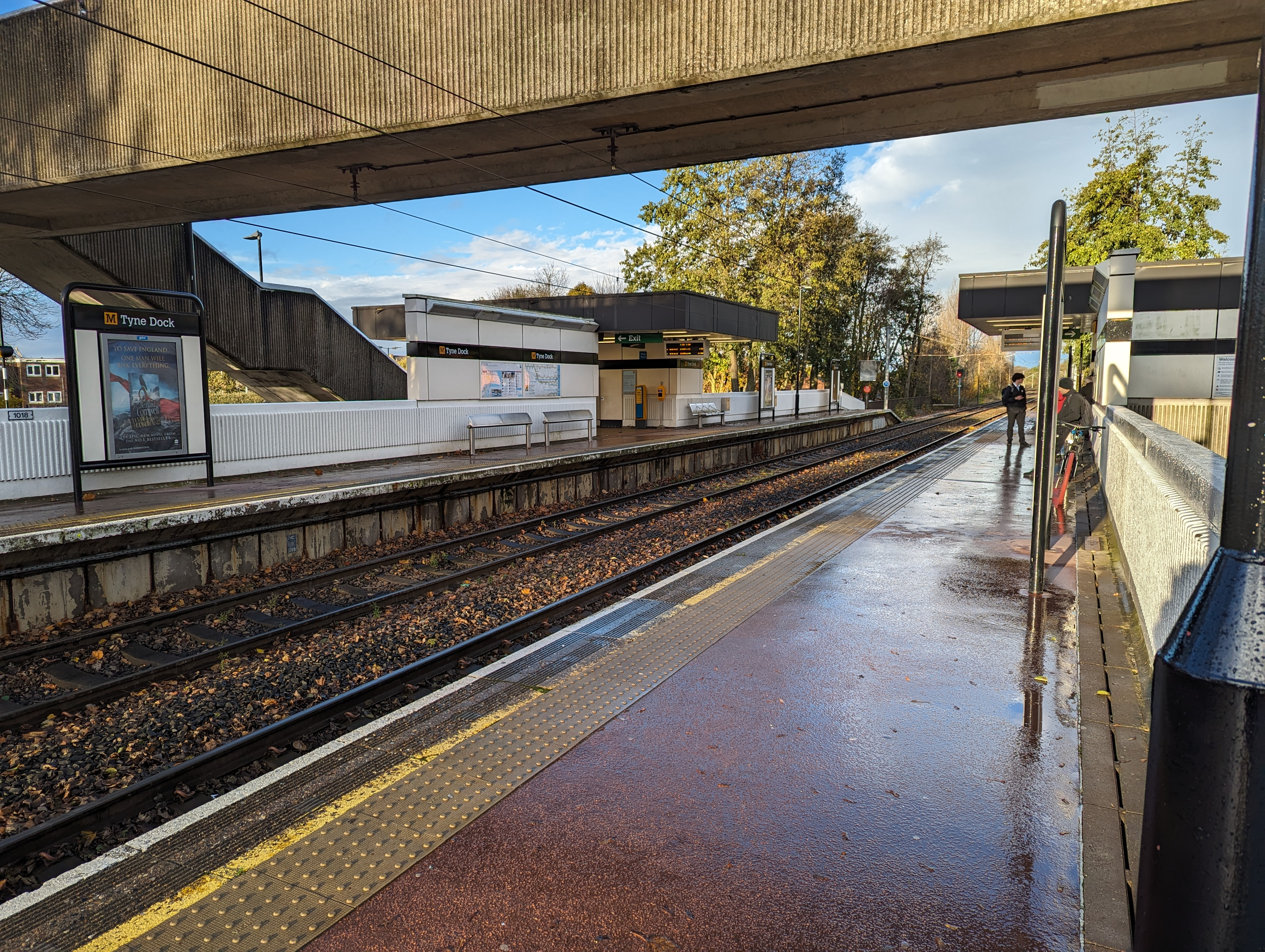

General information
- Location: Tyne Dock, South Tyneside; England
- Coordinates: 54°58′34″N 1°26′30″W
- Grid reference: NZ358647
- System: Tyne and Wear Metro station
- Transit authority: Tyne and Wear PTE
- Platforms: 2
- Tracks: 2

Construction
- Parking: 34 spaces
- Cycle facilities: 2 cycle pods
- Accessible: Step-free access to platform

Other information
- Station code: TDK
- Fare zone: C

History
- Original company: Stanhope and Tyne Railway
- Pre-grouping: North Eastern Railway
- Post-grouping: London and North Eastern Railway; British Rail (Eastern Region)

Key dates
- 1 August 1856: Opened as Jarrow Dock
- 1 January 1861: Resited and renamed Tyne Dock
- 1 June 1981: Closed for conversion
- 24 March 1984: Reopened

Passengers
- 2024/25: 0.673 million

Services
| Preceding station | Tyne and Wear Metro | Following station |
|---|---|---|
| Chichester towards South Shields | Yellow line | Simonside towards St James via Whitley Bay |
Location
- Location within Tyne and Wear

Tyne Dock is a Tyne and Wear Metro station, serving South Tyneside Hospital and the suburb of Tyne Dock, South Tyneside in Tyne and Wear, England. It joined the network on 24 March 1984, following the opening of the fifth phase of the network, between Heworth and South Shields.

== History ==
The station was opened as Jarrow Dock on 1 August 1856, by the Stanhope and Tyne Railway. It was later resited and renamed Tyne Dock on 1 January 1861.

The resited station was situated to the east of the divergence of the Brandling Junction Railway and the Stanhope and Tyne Railway route via Chichester. The current Tyne and Wear Metro station is built to the east of the divergence, but on the former Stanhope and Tyne Railway route.

The route via High Shields was closed in June 1981, with the Tyne and Wear Metro line to South Shields following the former route of the Stanhope and Tyne Railway.

The station was refurbished in 2018, at a cost of £350,000. The refurbishment project involved the installation of white vitreous enamel panels, new seating and lighting, and improved security and accessibility, as well as resurfaced platforms. The station was also painted in the new black and white corporate colour scheme.

== Facilities ==
Step-free access is available at all stations across the Tyne and Wear Metro network, with ramps providing step-free access to both platforms at Tyne Dock. The station is equipped with ticket machines, waiting shelter, seating, next train information displays, timetable posters, and an emergency help point on both platforms. Ticket machines are able to accept payment with credit and debit card (including contactless payment), notes and coins. The station is also fitted with smartcard validators, which feature at all stations across the network.

There is a free car park available at the station, with 34 spaces. There is also the provision for cycle parking, with two cycle pods available for use.

== Services ==
As of April 2021, the station is served by up to five trains per hour on weekdays and Saturday, and up to four trains per hour during the evening and on Sunday.
