= Easington railway station =

Railway station in County Durham, England

Easington
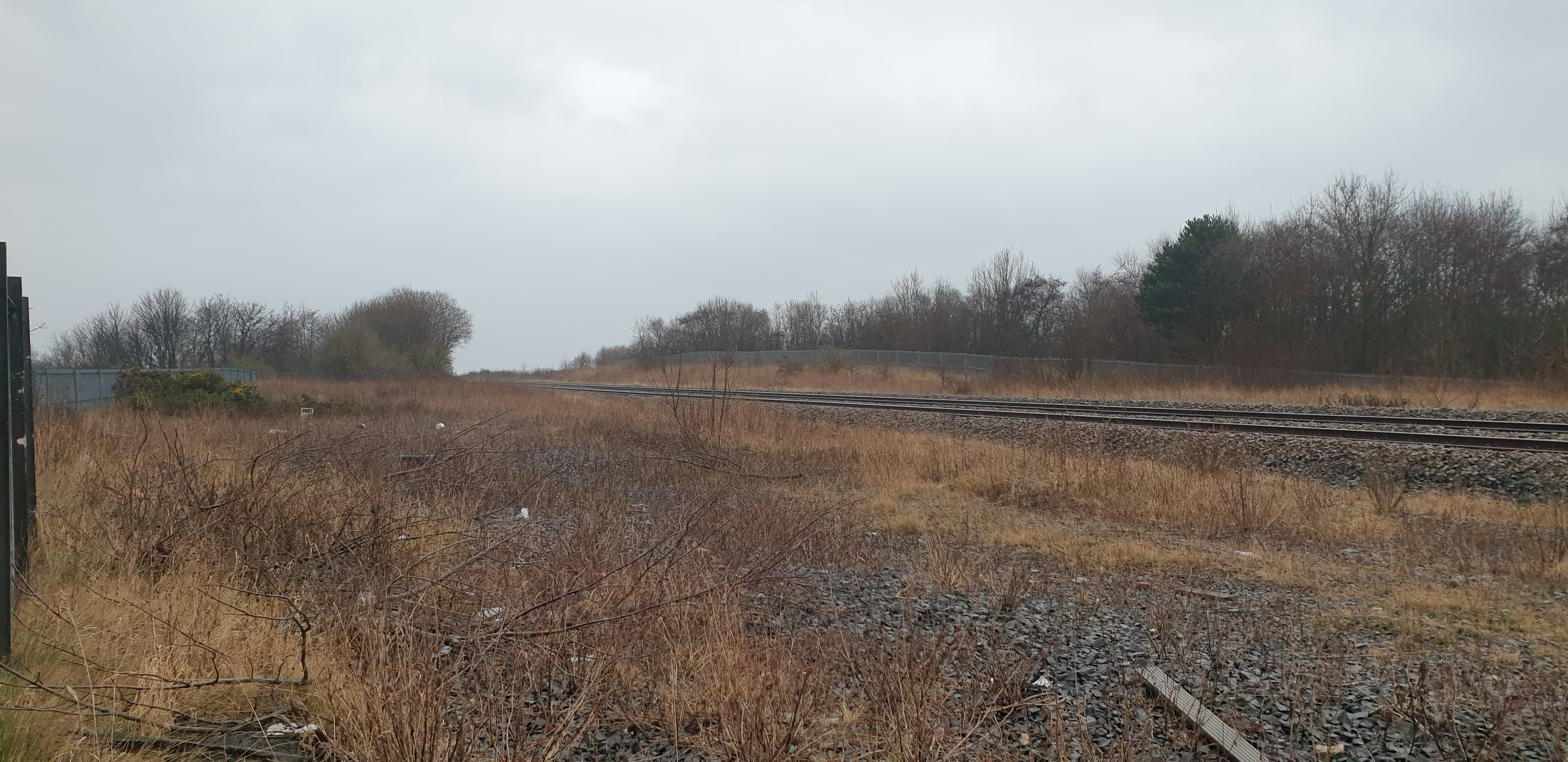
- The site of the station in February 2021.

General information
- Location: Easington Colliery, County Durham; England
- Coordinates: 54.7854°N 1.3166°W
- Platforms: 2

Other information
- Status: Disused

History
- Original company: North Eastern Railway
- Pre-grouping: North Eastern Railway
- Post-grouping: London and North Eastern Railway; British Rail (North Eastern)

Key dates
- 1 April 1905: Opened
- 4 May 1964: Closed
Location

Easington railway station served the town of Easington Colliery and Easington Village in County Durham, North East England. It was located on the Durham Coast Line between the stations at Horden and Seaham (originally Seaham Colliery).

== History ==
The original station was opened by the North Eastern Railway as a stop on its new coastal line which linked the former Londonderry (Seaham to Sunderland) Railway at Seaham and the former Hartlepool Dock and Railway at Hart when that line was opened to passenger traffic on 1 April 1905. This line was primarily built to avoid the steep gradients of the inland route at Seaton Bank and Hesleden Bank but also provided access to the newly developed collieries along the Durham Coast. During World War II, an additional halt – Hawthorn Tower Halt – was provided on the line between here and Seaham for workmen.

Along with other stations minor stations on the Durham Coast Line, Easington was recommended for closure as part of the Beeching cuts. This occurred on 4 May 1964 when all stopping services on the line between Sunderland and Hartlepool were withdrawn. Passenger services continue to pass through the site of the station, but the only station between Seaham and Hartlepool to have been reopened (as of 2021) is at Horden.

Preceding station	Historical railways	Following station
Horden (1905-1964); Line open; station closed	London and North Eastern Railway; Durham Coast Line	Hawthorn Tower Halt (For workmen); Line open; station closed
Horden (1905-1964); Line open; station closed	London and North Eastern Railway; Durham Coast Line	Seaham; Line and station open
