= Seaham Hall Dene railway station =

Disused railway station in Seaham, County Durham

Seaham Hall Dene
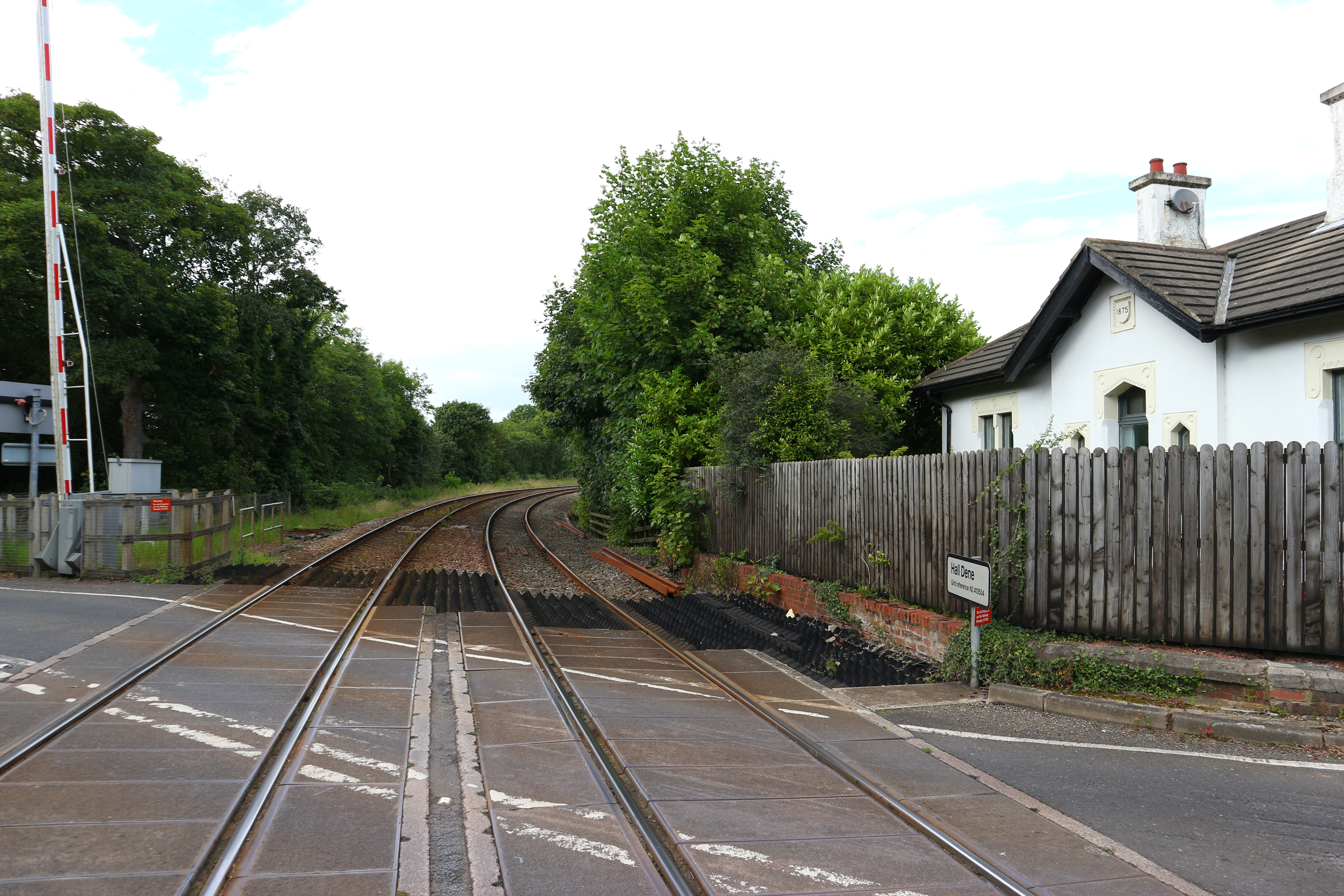
- The site of Seaham Hall Dene station in July 2017

General information
- Location: Seaham, County Durham; England
- Coordinates: 54.8472°N 1.3576°W
- Grid reference: NZ413504
- Platforms: 2

Other information
- Status: Disused

History
- Opened: 1875; 151 years ago
- Closed: 1 March 1925; 101 years ago
- Original company: Londonderry (Seaham to Sunderland) Railway
- Pre-grouping: North Eastern Railway
- Post-grouping: LNER
Location

Seaham Hall Dene railway station (also referred to as Hall Dene, Seaham Dene or Seaham Hall) was a private railway station that served Seaham Hall, then a home of the Marquess of Londonderry close to the town of Seaham, County Durham, England from 1875 to 1925 on the Durham Coast Line.

== History ==
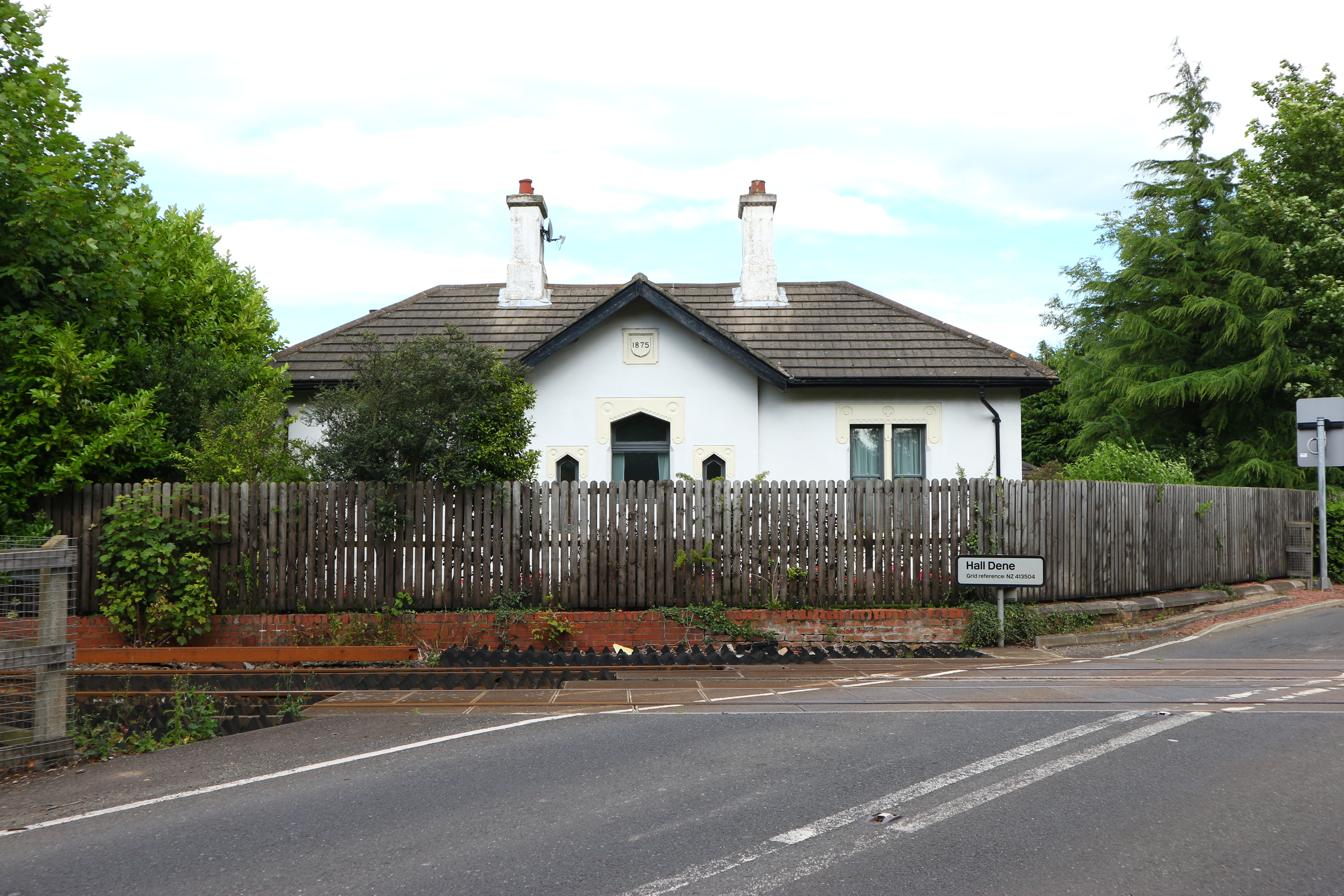
The former station building at Seaham Hall Dene which is now a private residence, seen in July 2017.

In 1854 the Londonderry (Seaham to Sunderland) Railway (LSSR) opened to link its network of colliery railways to the newly constructed South Dock in Sunderland due to the lack of capacity in Seaham Harbour. Though constructed primarily for mineral traffic, passengers were also carried between Seaham Harbour and Hendon Burn in Sunderland from 1855 until the LSSR began to use the Hendon terminus of the North Eastern Railway in 1868. An additional station was opened in 1875 to serve the home of the Londonderry family who had provided much of the funding for the line.

The station was situated north of Seaham station (originally Seaham Colliery station) and south of Ryhope East station.

In 1879 the North Eastern Railway closed Hendon station to be replaced by Sunderland Central station and so all LSSR services were diverted into the new station. The LSSR did, however, remain independent until the Marquis of Londonderry agreed to sell the Londonderry (Seaham to Sunderland) Railway to the North Eastern Railway in the North Eastern Railway Act 1900 (63 & 64 Vict. c. clxiii) of 30 July 1900, though this sale did not include Hall Dene station which remained under the ownership of the Marquess. The NER took over operation of the route on 6 October 1900 and then, on 1 April 1905 opened an extension of it along the coast to West Hartlepool.

As part of the North Eastern Railway Act 1900 that enabled the NER to purchase the Seaham to Sunderland line, the marquess retained the power "to stop other than express trains within reasonable limits" although this privilege was only used four times between 1900 and 1923. After the NER was amalgamated into the London and North Eastern Railway in the grouping of 1923, the LNER requested that this privilege be abolished and consequentially the station ceased to be used from 1 March 1925.

The original station building remains and has been converted to a private house; it is a Grade II listed building.

Preceding station	Historical railways	Following station
Seaham Colliery; Line and station open	North Eastern Railway; Durham Coast Line	Ryhope East; Line open, station closed
