= St Peter's, Tyne & Wear =

There are two localities by the name of St. Peter's within Tyne and Wear:

- St Peter's, Sunderland
  - St Peter's Metro station serving the above
- St Peter's, Newcastle upon Tyne
