= Hart railway station =

Disused railway station in Hart, County Durham

Hart
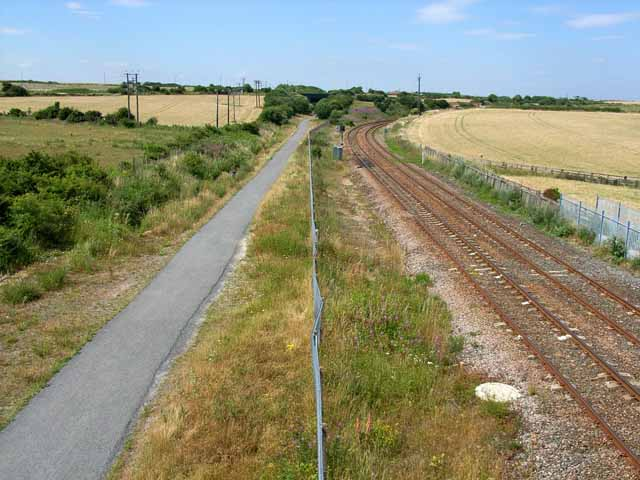
- View northwest from the site of the station in 2006. The Durham Coast Line can be seen veering off to the right while the route of the line towards Haswell and Ferryhill can be seen continuing straight ahead.

General information
- Location: Hart Station, Hartlepool; England
- Coordinates: 54.7194°N 1.2517°W
- Grid reference: NZ483363
- Platforms: 4

Other information
- Status: Disused

History
- Original company: Hartlepool Dock and Railway
- Pre-grouping: North Eastern Railway
- Post-grouping: London and North Eastern Railway; British Railways (North Eastern)

Key dates
- 1 May 1839: Opened as Crimdon
- October 1871: Renamed Hart
- 28 July 1941: Temporarily closed
- 7 October 1946: Reopened
- 31 August 1953: Closed to passengers
- September 1963: Closed completely
Location

Hart railway station was a station that served the villages of Hart and Crimdon in County Durham, England.

The station was built by the Hartlepool Dock and Railway (HD&R) as a stop on their main line between Hartlepool and Haswell but, under its successors, would later become a stop on the Hartlepool–Haswell–Sunderland, Hartlepool–Ferryhill and Durham Coast line.

== History ==
=== The Hartlepool Dock and Railway and the opening of the station ===
Construction of the HD&R was first authorised by the Hartlepool Dock and Railway Act 1832 (2 & 3 Will. 4. c. lxvii) obtained on 1 June 1832 which granted the railway company powers to construct a 14-mile railway from Moorsley (near Houghton-le-Spring) to Hartlepool as well as a number of short branches to serve collieries surrounding the line and the Hartlepool Dock and Railway (Durham Branch) Act 1834 (4 & 5 Will. 4. c. lvi) of 16 June 1834 authorised an additional branch to Gilesgate in the City of Durham. However competition from other railway companies (most notably the Durham and Sunderland Railway) diverted much of the traffic that the company had been intending to access along other routes thus meaning that the H&DR only reached as far as Haswell and most of its branches were either cut short or left unbuilt. Nonetheless, the curtailed line opened to mineral traffic (as far as Haswell) on 23 November 1835 and, when passenger trains were introduced on 1 May 1839, a station, originally named Crimdon, was provided to serve Hart village.

From 1845, the HD&R leased the Great North of England, Clarence and Hartlepool Junction Railway (GNEC&HJR) which had opened a line from a junction with the HD&R at Wingate to Ferryhill six years earlier. However just a year after the HD&R leased the GNEC&HJR, both companies were leased by the newly formed York and Newcastle Railway, before being amalgamated into its successor, the York, Newcastle and Berwick Railway, on 22 July 1848. These leases meant that, from 1846, passenger trains serving Crimdon began to also run through to Ferryhill over the GNEC&HJR.

=== NER improvements and the Durham Coast Line ===
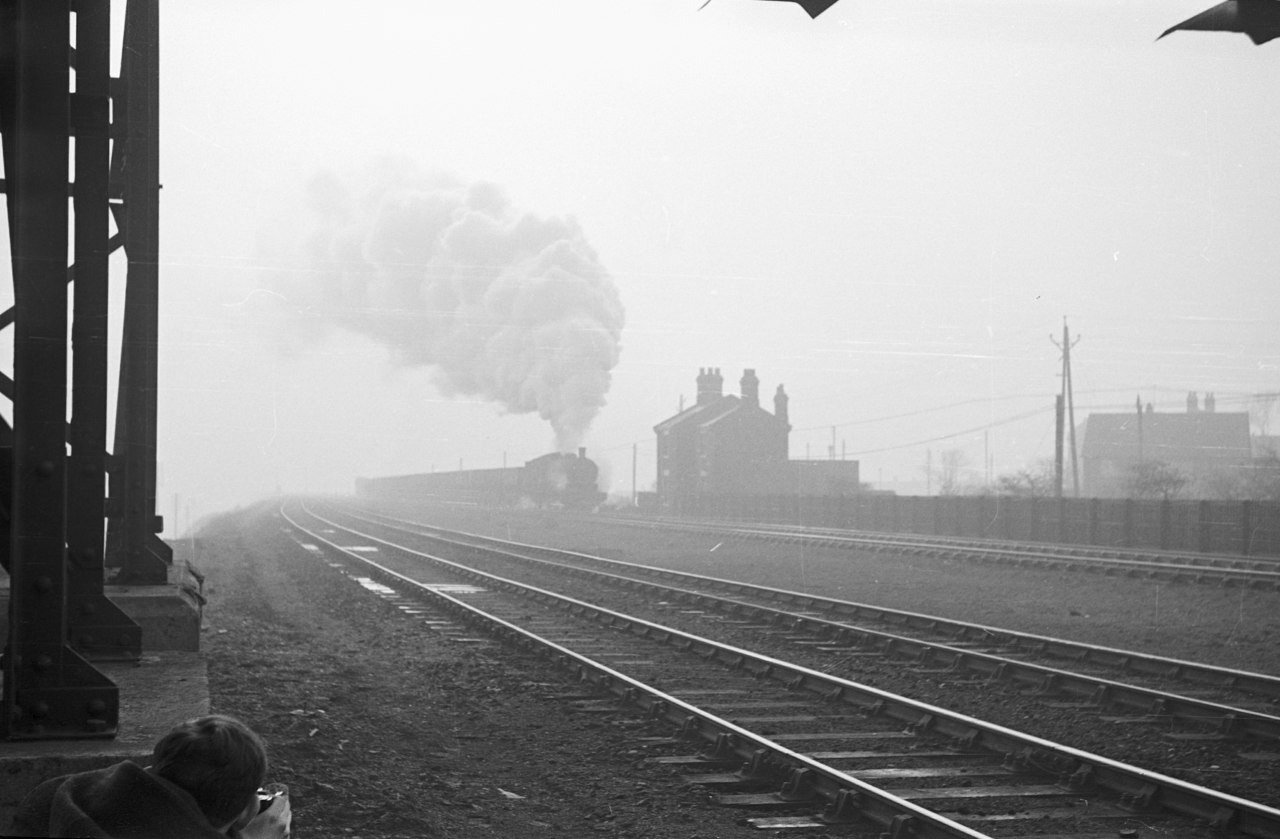
A view across the site of station's platforms from under the footbridge in April 1965. The two tracks nearest the photographer are those of the Coast Line and the farthest two are those of the original Hartlepool Dock and Railway. Note the station house on the far side of the tracks.

On the 31 July 1854, the YN&BR was amalgamated with other companies to form the North Eastern Railway (NER). Under the NER, a programme of works was initiated to improve the ex-HD&R and ex-D&SR networks during the 1850s-1870s: in 1874, the tracks up the original 1 in 34 rope-worked incline at Hesleden Bank (which commenced just to the west of Crimdon station) were realigned to ease the gradients and enable locomotive working. In 1877, two connections were installed to link the ex-HD&R network into those of its neighbours: a chord was built at Haswell to allow through trains to continue beyond the ex-HD&R terminus northwards to Sunderland via ex-D&SR network and a new line was constructed at Hartlepool to provide a direct connection to the former Stockton and Hartlepool Railway network at West Hartlepool (which gradually became the primary southern terminus for Crimdon's passenger services). In October 1871, Crimdon station was renamed Hart despite being located over 1 mile (1.6 km) from the village of that name.

Despite the improvements of the 1850s-1870s, the route through Hart continued to provide a steep and indirect route between West Hartlepool and Sunderland and so the NER purchased the Seaham to Sunderland line of the Londonderry (Seaham to Sunderland) Railway in 1900 and extended it along the coast to meet the ex-HD&R line at the station, paralleling it between there and Cemetery North Junction (approximately 1.25 miles (2.01 km) further south). The new line, opened on 1 April 1905, bypassed both Hesleden Bank and Seaton Bank further north, thus contributing to the gradual diversion of much of the longer-distance traffic away from the inland route. Although the new line passed immediately to the east of the original platforms at Hart, early line diagrams indicate that additional wooden platforms were only erected to allow trains on the Coast Line to call at Hart several years after the line opened.

From 1920, a then popular holiday park was developed at the nearby settlement of Crimdon and Hart station became the primary railhead through which day trippers from the surrounding mining communities arrived at the resort.

=== Decline and closure ===
The NER became part of the London and North Eastern Railway (LNER) as part of the 1923 grouping. As was the case for several minor stations on the East Coast Main Line in North Northumberland (such as Scremerston), the LNER temporarily closed Hart station to passengers as a wartime economy measure on 28 July 1941. The station initially reopened as a summer-only station on 7 October 1946, before services were fully restored on 6 October 1947.

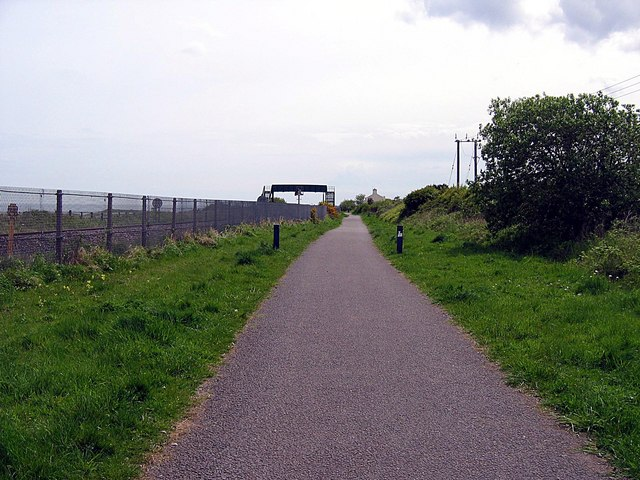
The station site in May 2009 viewed from the western end on what was once the trackbed of the original Hartlepool Dock and Railway line. The modern footbridge can be seen close to the site of the earlier station footbridge.

The LNER in the North East came under the control of the North Eastern Region of British Railways following its nationalisation in 1948. By this time, passenger and goods traffic across the country was in decline and this was the case for Hart station and the routes from West Hartlepool to Sunderland and Ferryhill through it. Consequentially, Hart lost its weekday service from August 1950 and stopping passenger services were withdrawn completely from the inland lines on 9 June 1952. Nonetheless, Hart continued to be served by Coast Line passenger services until the station was closed to passengers on 31 August 1953 and was retained as a goods station until September 1963 when it closed completely. By 1967, the station platforms had been demolished.

Many of the stations on the inland Sunderland and Ferryhill lines remained open to goods traffic until 1966 and the former line was still used by Sunday diversions until the late 1960s when the section through Haswell was dismantled. Even after the line was severed, a single line was maintained along the ex-HD&R line as far as Pesspool Junction (a short distance to the north of Shotton Bridge station) to provide a southerly outlet for coal from South Hetton and Hawthorn Collieries until around the time of the 1984 miner's strike. The Coast Line remains open and, as of 2021, a modern footbridge still crosses it at the site of Hart station.

Once the remaining tracks were lifted on the Haswell line, work commenced on converting the disused section into the Hart to Haswell Walkway which reaches its southern terminus at the station site and which was later extended to Ryhope after the closure of the remaining northern section of the line between Hawthorn Colliery and Ryhope Junction in 1991.

Preceding station	Historical railways	Following station
Hartlepool; Line and station closed	Hartlepool Dock and Railway	Castle Eden Colliery; Line and station closed
West Hartlepool; Line closed; station open	London and North Eastern Railway; Hartlepool–Haswell–Sunderland Line	Hesleden; Line and station closed
West Hartlepool; Line closed; station open	London and North Eastern Railway; Hartlepool–Ferryhill Line	Hesleden; Line and station closed
West Hartlepool; Line and station open	London and North Eastern Railway; Durham Coast Line	Blackhall Rocks; Line open; station closed
