= Ryhope East railway station =

Disused railway station in Ryhope, Tyne and Wear

Ryhope East
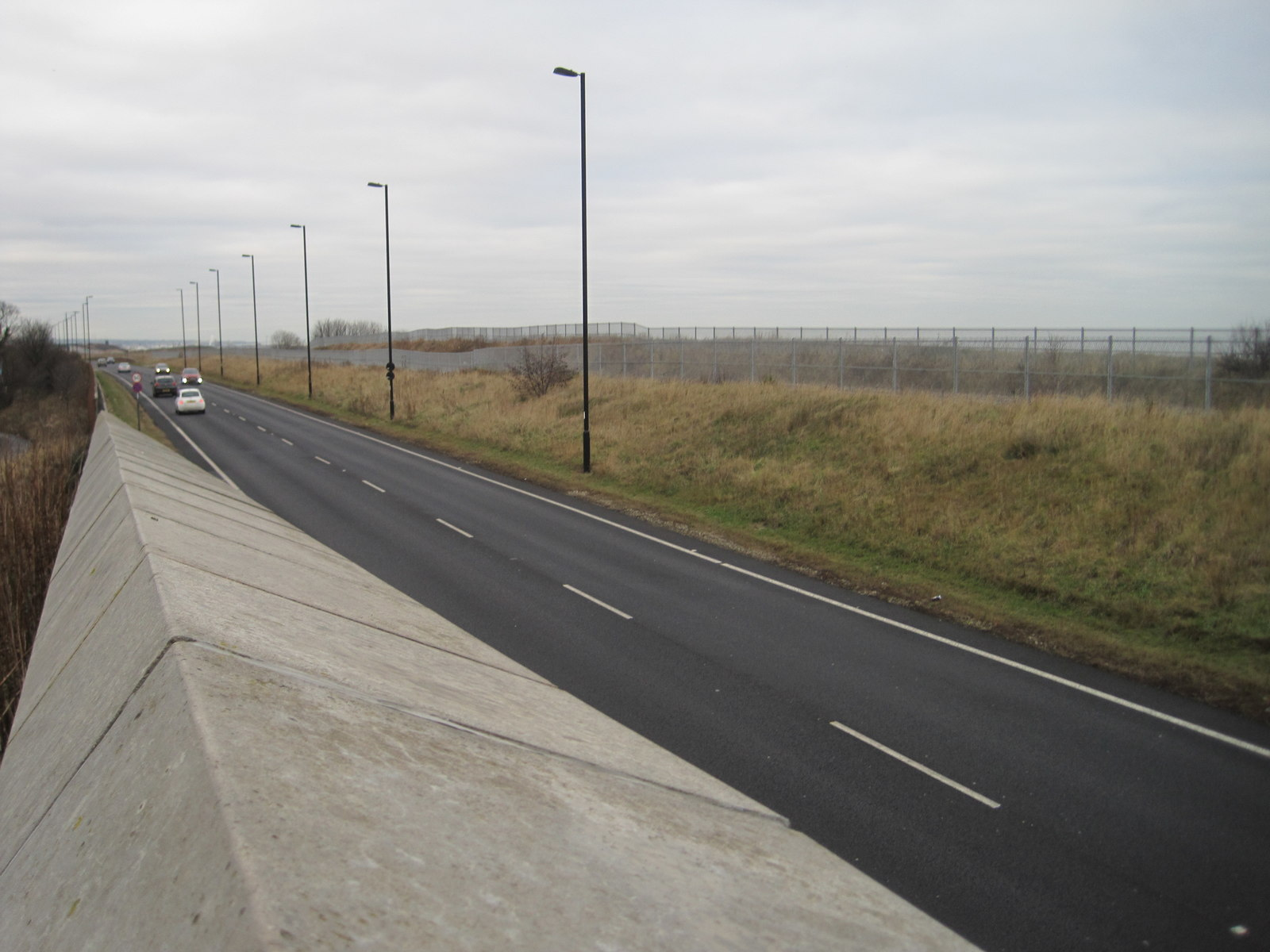
- The site of the station in 2017

General information
- Location: Ryhope, Tyne and Wear; England
- Coordinates: 54.8674°N 1.356°W
- Grid reference: NZ414527
- Platforms: 2

Other information
- Status: Disused

History
- Original company: Londonderry (Seaham to Sunderland) Railway
- Pre-grouping: North Eastern Railway
- Post-grouping: London and North Eastern Railway; British Rail (North Eastern)

Key dates
- 2 July 1855: Opened as Ryhope
- 1904: Renamed Ryhope East
- 7 March 1960: Closed to passengers
- 1964: Closed completely
Location

Ryhope East was one of two railway stations to have served the village of Ryhope, Tyne and Wear, North East England. Opened in 1858 as a stop on the short Londonderry (Seaham to Sunderland) Railway, it became a minor stop on the Durham Coast Line following that line's incorporation into it in 1905.

== History ==
In 1854 the Marquis of Londonderry opened the Londonderry (Seaham to Sunderland) Railway (LSSR) to link his network of colliery railways to the newly constructed South Dock in Sunderland due to the lack of capacity in Seaham Harbour. Though constructed primarily for mineral traffic, passengers were also carried between Seaham Harbour and Hendon Burn in Sunderland from 1855, where the LSSR opened an additional station to serve Ryhope on 2 July. The station was originally named Ryhope and was designed by Brewer, Estate Clarke of Works of the Marquess of Londonderry at the time, who was responsible for its architecture being distinct from that of others North Eastern Railway (NER) stations in the vicinity.

From 1868 the LSSR began to use the Hendon terminus of the NER's Durham to Sunderland Line until the NER replaced this in turn with Sunderland Central station in 1879. Although the LSSR shared the NER's Sunderland terminus, it was not until 1900 that Londonderry agreed to sell his Seaham to Sunderland route to the NER and, following this acquisition under the North Eastern Railway Act 1900 (63 & 64 Vict. c. clxiii), the line was extended along the coast to West Hartlepool in 1905. To distinguish the station from the NER's other Ryhope station on the Durham to Sunderland Line, the station was renamed Ryhope East in 1904.

The station closed to passengers on 7 March 1960, but remained open to goods traffic until 1964.

| Preceding station | Historical railways | Following station |
|---|---|---|
| Seaham Hall Dene (Private station); Line open; station closed | North Eastern Railway; Durham Coast Line | Sunderland Central; Line and station open |
| Seaham Colliery; Line and station open | North Eastern Railway; Durham Coast Line | Sunderland Central; Line and station open |
