= Ryhope railway station =

Disused railway station in Ryhope, Tyne and Wear

Ryhope
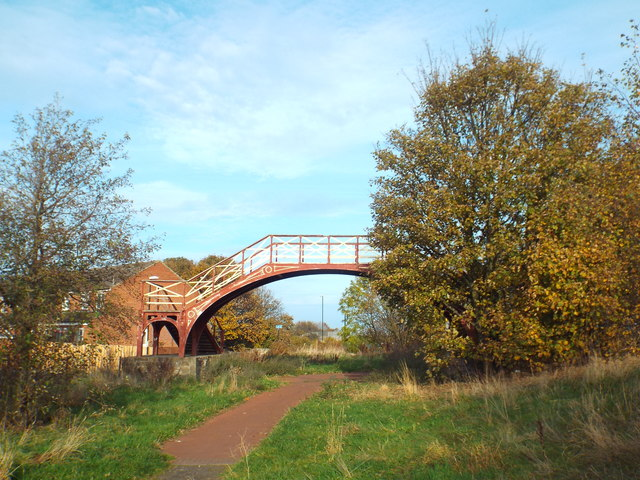
- The site of the second station in 2016. Note that the footbridge and short sections of both platforms remain in situ.

General information
- Location: Ryhope, Tyne & Wear; England
- Platforms: 2

Other information
- Status: Disused

History
- Original company: Durham and Sunderland Railway
- Pre-grouping: North Eastern Railway
- Post-grouping: London and North Eastern Railway; British Rail (North Eastern)

Key dates
- 19 October 1836: First station opened as Ryhope
- 1894: First station replace by second
- 5 January 1953: Second station closed to passengers
- 7 March 1960: Goods station renamed Ryhope East
- 1 June 1964: Second station closed completely

Ryhope railway station was one of two railway stations to have served the village of Ryhope, Tyne & Wear. For much of its existence, it was served by the Durham–Sunderland and Hartlepool–Haswell–Sunderland lines.

== History ==
=== The Durham and Sunderland Railway and the opening of the first station ===
On 13 August 1834, the Durham and Sunderland Railway was granted powers in the Durham and Sunderland Railway Act 1834 (4 & 5 Will. 4. c. xcvi) to construct their main line between Sunderland South Dock and Durham City, and a branch linking Haswell to main line at Murton Junction. The Sunderland to Haswell section was the first to be completed, officially opening on 30 August 1836 and the first station at Ryhope (co-ordinates: 54.8694°N 1.3559°W) was opened on 19 October 1836 as the temporary southern terminus of the line's first passenger service from Sunderland Town Moor. From April or May 1837, D&SR passenger services were extended to a station at Haswell where passengers could change for services to Hartlepool from the adjacent Hartlepool Dock and Railway station (though the different companies' tracks were not, initially, connected). The line between Murton and Durham was completed gradually and, when finally opened on 28 June 1839, it served Durham City by means of a station at Shincliffe Town, over 1 mile (1.6 km) from the centre. The steep topography that the line traversed meant that, unlike many of its competitors, D&SR opted to haul its trains using a series of stationary winding engines, with change-over between the Sunderland and Seaton Bank Top engines having been undertaken at Ryhope.

=== NER improvements and the opening of the second station ===
In 1846, the Newcastle and Darlington Junction Railway purchased the D&SR. and promptly renamed itself the York and Newcastle Railway. The York and Newcastle Railway later also took out a lease on the HD&R before both were amalgamated into the York, Newcastle and Berwick Railway in 1848 and then the North Eastern Railway (NER) in 1854.

By around 1860, the NER had converted the ex-D&SR network to locomotive haulage and Ryhope's passenger services were diverted to new northern termini at Hendon in 1858 and then Sunderland Central in 1879. From 1877, the opening of a new chord to connect the ex-D&SR and ex-HD&R lines at Haswell saw Ryhope served by direct through-trains to West Hartlepool and, from 1893, construction of a new terminus at Durham Elvet finally provided the station with trains to Durham City centre.

Despite the line's conversion to locomotive working, gradients remained steep, with the first Ryhope station having sat on a gradient of 1 in 60 and the line between there and Seaton having an average gradient of 1 in 44. On 19 August 1889, a Liverpool to Newcastle express train derailed while rounding the sharp curve at the foot of Seaton Bank at too high a speed, injuring 101 passengers. In response, the NER realigned the curve and replaced the original Ryhope station with a new one, located on the curve, 11 chains (220 m) further south (co-ordinates: 54.8674°N 1.357°W), in 1894 at a cost of £1,080. The NER also issued an instruction that all passenger trains descending Seaton Bank must momentarily stop at the new Ryhope station so as to ensure drivers control their speed during the descent.

This second station was situated immediately to the southeast of George Street, which had been diverted to pass under the railway when the station was built. A single-story brick-built booking office and waiting room was located on the down (northbound) platform while a timber waiting room and toilet block was located on the up (southbound) platform. The platforms were linked with a standard late 19th century NER footbridge, which remains in situ as of 2021. Close to the station was a siding serving a brickworks while a branch to Ryhope and Silksworth Collieries diverged from the ex-D&SR line a short distance to the north.

=== Decline and closure ===
Despite the improvements of the 1850s-1890s, the route through Ryhope continued to provide a steep and indirect route between West Hartlepool and Sunderland and so the NER purchased the Seaham to Sunderland line of the Londonderry (Seaham to Sunderland) Railway (LSSR) (which paralleled the original D&SR north of Ryhope) in 1900 and extended it along the coast to meet the ex-HD&R line near at Hart. The new line, opened on 1 April 1905, bypassed both Seaton Bank and Hesleden Bank further south and thus led to the gradual diversion of much of the longer-distance traffic away from the lines through Ryhope station. The LSSR had had its own station at Ryhope, approximately 100 yards (91 m) to the east of the NER-build one, which was now under also under NER ownership. From December 1903, the two stations were administered as one, with a shared station master, and, from 1904, the ex-LSSR station was renamed Ryhope East.

The NER became part of the London & North Eastern Railway as part of the 1923 grouping. Already beginning to experience a decline in traffic, the LNER withdrew regular passenger services from the Durham–Sunderland line west of Pittington on 1 January 1931. Nonetheless, Ryhope retained almost hourly service frequencies on both lines during the 1930s.

The LNER came under the control of the North Eastern Region of British Railways following its nationalisation in 1948 and, by this time, the decline in rail passenger and goods traffic was becoming more serious. Nonetheless, BR initially reinstated the hourly service on the Pittington line (previously reduced during World War II) but appears to have been unsuccessful and ticket sales at both Ryhope stations amounted to only 6,917 by 1911. The Hartlepool–Haswell–Sunderland line lost its stopping passenger service (south of Murton) on 9 June 1952 and Ryhope closed to passengers completely when the remaining Pittington–Sunderland passenger service was withdrawn on 5 January 1953. Ryhope station remained open for goods to share the burden on Ryhope East's goods-handling facilities and, when the latter closed to passengers on 7 March 1960, the former was renamed so that both goods stations were called Ryhope East. Both closed to goods on 1 June 1964.

The remainder of the Durham line was dismantled west of Pittington following its complete closure on 11 November 1963 while many of the stations on the West Hartlepool line remained open to goods until 1966, and it was still used by Sunday diversions until the section through Haswell was dismantled in the late 1960s. Still, the northern section of the former West Hartlepool line was retained through Ryhope to provide a northerly outlet for coal from South Hetton and Hawthorn Collieries until 1991. Once this last section of the line was lifted, the Hart to Haswell Walkway was extended to terminate at the site of Ryhope station.

Preceding station	Disused railways	Following station
Seaton Bank Top; Line and station closed	Durham and Sunderland Railway	Sunderland Town Moor; Line and station closed
Seaton; Line and station closed	London and North Eastern Railway; Durham–Sunderland line	Sunderland Central; Line closed; station open
Seaton; Line and station closed	London and North Eastern Railway; Hartlepool–Haswell–Sunderland line	Sunderland Central; Line closed; station open
