= Durham Coast Line =

Railway line in North East England

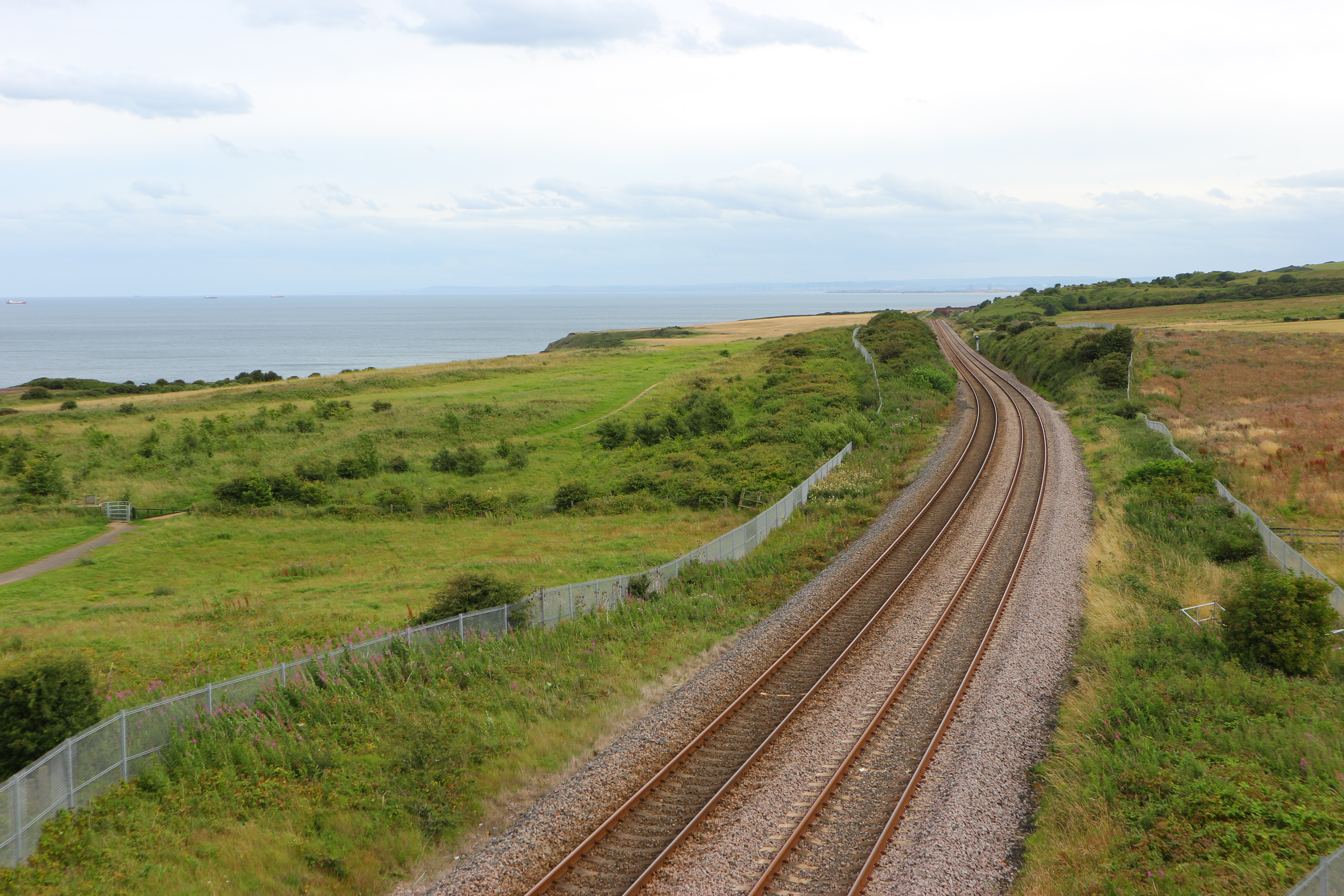
- Looking south-east along the line towards Horden, as it leaves Seaham.

Overview
- Status: Operational
- Owner: Network Rail
- Locale: County Durham; Tyne and Wear; Tees Valley
- Termini: Newcastle; Middlesbrough
- Stations: 11

Service
- Type: Heavy rail
- System: National Rail
- Operators: Grand Central; Northern Trains; Tyne and Wear Metro
- Rolling stock: Class 156; Class 158; Class 180; Class 555; Class 599 Metrocar

History
- Opened: 1833–1905

Technical
- Line length: 39.5 miles (63.6 km)
- Number of tracks: 2
- Track gauge: 4 ft 8 1/2 in (1,435 mm)
- Electrification: 1,500 V DC (between Pelaw Junction & Sunderland South Junction)
Route map
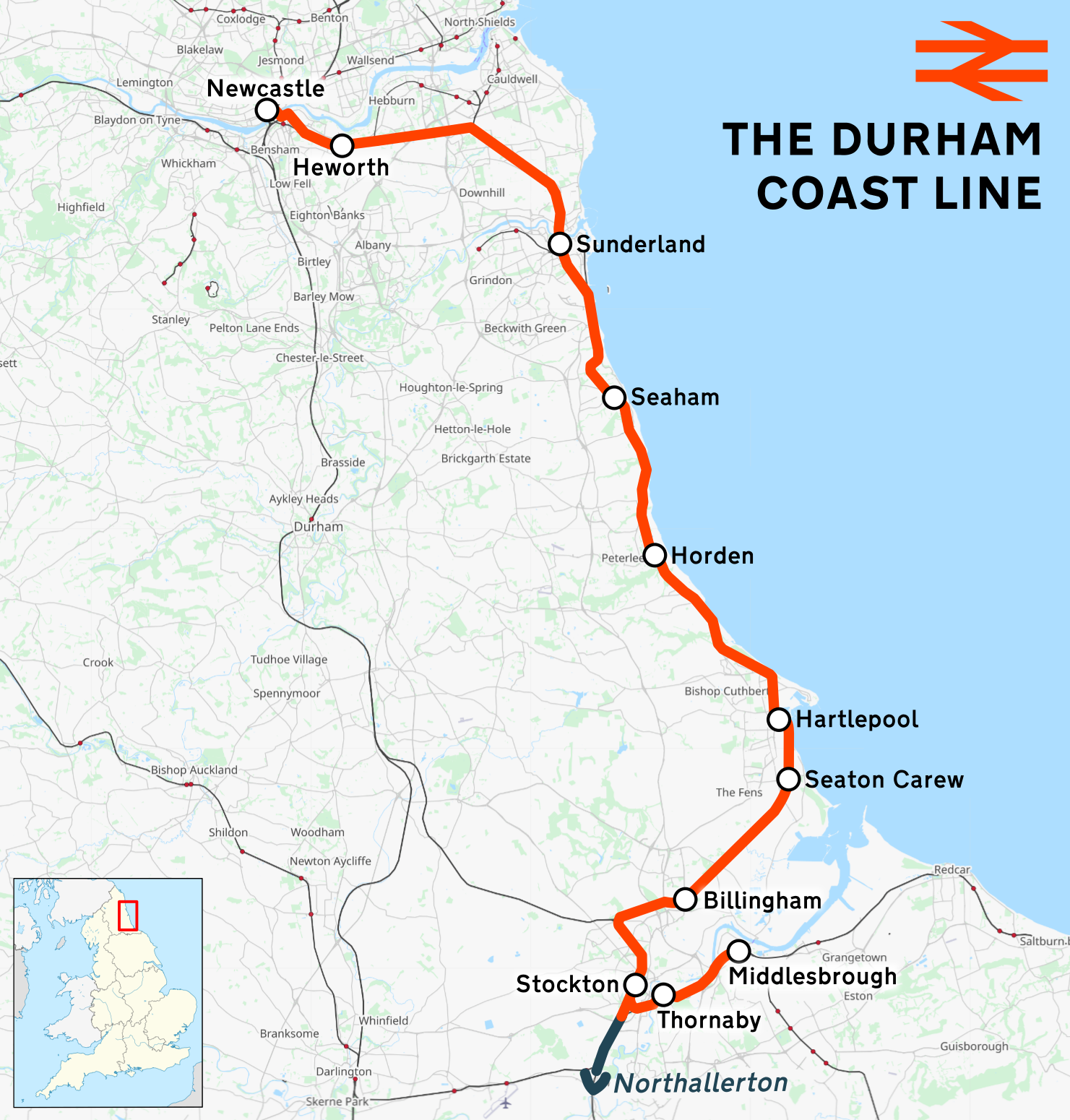
(Click to expand)

The Durham Coast Line (DCL) is an approximately 39.5-mile (63.6 km) railway line running between Newcastle and Middlesbrough in North East England. Heavy rail passenger services, predominantly operated by Northern Trains, and some freight services operate over the whole length of the line; it provides an important diversionary route at times when the East Coast Main Line is closed. Light rail services of the Tyne and Wear Metro's Green Line also operate over the same tracks between a junction just south of Sunderland station and Pelaw Junction (just east of Pelaw Metro station).

The line developed from several small competing independent railway companies during the first half of the 19th century which ultimately came under the control of the North Eastern Railway. It was under their direction that these lines were gradually linked together to eventually create the Durham Coast Line in 1905.

== History ==
=== Origins ===
The current route of the Durham Coast Line has its origins in some of the earliest locomotive-operated railways in North East England. The oldest section of the line in use today is that between North Shore Junction and Norton South Junction, constructed by the Clarence Railway. As with many of the early railways, this line was constructed primarily for the transportation of coal from western and central areas of the Durham Coalfield to the River Tees at North Shore (in Stockton), and Port Clarence. Despite major financial difficulties, this line was opened to mineral traffic in 1833, but did not carry passengers until July 1835, when a service was introduced between Coxhoe and Stockton (Clarence).

Map of the railways of eastern County Durham in the 1850s, demonstrating the routes of several of the small competing railways which were later incorporated into the Durham Coast Line.

The opening of the Clarence was closely followed by the Hartlepool Dock and Railway (HD&R), a similar concern, intended to link the collieries surrounding the City of Durham, to the coast at Hartlepool (rather than the River Tees). The HD&R was first authorised by an act of Parliament, the Hartlepool Dock and Railway Act 1832 (2 & 3 Will. 4. c. lxvii), obtained on 1 June 1832 to construct a 14-mile railway from Moorsley (near Houghton-le-Spring) to Hartlepool with several short branches to serve collieries surrounding the line. The company obtained a further act of Parliament, the Hartlepool Dock and Railway (Durham Branch) Act 1834 (4 & 5 Will. 4. c. lvi) of 16 June 1834, which permitted construction of an additional branch to Gilesgate in the City of Durham. However competition from other railways meant that the HD&R main line only reached as far as Haswell and most of its branches were either cut short or left unbuilt; the curtailed line opened for mineral traffic on 23 November 1835 and passengers four years later.

The Durham and Sunderland Railway (D&SR) opened to both passenger and mineral traffic between Sunderland Town Moor, and collieries at Hetton-le-Hole and Haswell in 1836, competing directly with the HD&R for coal traffic from the latter. However, it was the D&SR which constructed the first significant north–south section of the Durham Coast Line, that between Ryhope Grange Junction and Ryhope. In conjunction with the HD&R, the D&SR thus enabled passengers to travel between Sunderland and Hartlepool for the first time by rail, although passengers had to change stations at Haswell at the time.

Tyne to Tees rail passenger travel then quickly became possible (with three changes of station) following the opening of Brandling Junction Railway between Oakwellgate (Gateshead) and Wearmouth (Monkwearmouth) on 5 September 1839 and the Stockton and Hartlepool Railway between the Clarence at Billingham-on-Tees, and a new terminus near West Hartlepool docks on 10 February 1841. The opening of the High Level Bridge over the River Tyne on 27 September 1849 subsequently extended this route through to Newcastle.

On its opening on 15 May 1852, the Leeds Northern Railway linked directly to the Clarence and, in doing so, provided the route with a link to the south. One year after the LNR reached Stockton, the newly created West Hartlepool Harbour and Railway (now owners of the Clarence lines) began to share the LNR station at North Stockton.

Londonderry Railway (Seaham to Sunderland) Act 1863
- Act of Parliament
- Parliament of the United Kingdom
- Long title: An Act for the Regulation and Management of certain Railways between Seaham and Sunderland in the County of Durham, the Construction of additional Railways in connexion therewith, the Acquisition of the Lands over which the same are or are to be constructed, and for other Purposes.
- Citation: 26 & 27 Vict. c. lxvi

Dates
- Royal assent: 8 June 1863

Text of statute as originally enacted

The last of the independent railways that became part of the modern DCL was the Londonderry (Seaham to Sunderland) Railway (LSSR) of 1854, constructed, primarily, to enable coal traffic from the Marquis of Londonderry's extensive colliery railway network to be diverted from Seaham Harbour (which had become unable to handle the large volumes of coal passing through it) to the recently constructed South Dock at Sunderland and thus followed route which parallel the D&SR north of Ryhope. Like the rest of the railways discussed here, the LSSR later introduced a passenger service on 2 July 1855 between Seaham and Hendon Burn.

=== Amalgamations and the creation of a through route ===
The Clarence Railway had struggled financially, almost continuously since its construction began, and so the more successful Stockton and Hartlepool Railway took out a 21-year lease on it in 1844 which became permanent in 1851. The two companies were then formally amalgamated together and with the West Hartlepool Harbour and Dock Company on 17 May 1853, to form the West Hartlepool Harbour and Railway (WHH&R).

Meanwhile, as part of its expansion, Newcastle and Darlington Junction Railway had taken over the BJR on 1 September 1844, and then purchased the D&SR in 1846. Following its amalgamation with the Great North of England Railway, the Newcastle and Darlington Junction Railway became the York and Newcastle Railway, and took out a lease on the HD&R before both became part of the York, Newcastle and Berwick Railway (YN&BR) under the York, Newcastle, and Berwick Railway (Hartlepool Dock and Railway, &c. Leasing) Act 1848 (11 & 12 Vict. c. lxxxi) of 22 July 1848. Finally, in 1854, the YN&BR, LNR, and York and North Midland Railway were amalgamated to form the North Eastern Railway (NER) which eventually absorbed the WHH&R in 1865. Thus, from 1865, one company was in control of the whole through route between Middlesbrough, Hartlepool, Sunderland and Newcastle, although the lines remained largely unconnected.

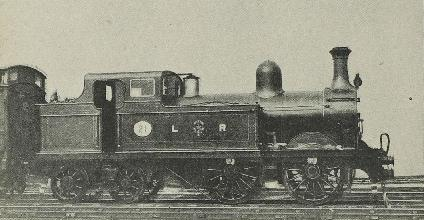
Londonderry (Seaham to Sunderland) Railway No. 21, at the front of what is likely an LSSR passenger train, during the final years of the line's independence in the 1890s.

Thus a series of improvements were initiated by the NER to better integrate is fragmented network. For the DCL, one of the first of these saw the construction of a new curve to link the ex-LNR Stockton branch to the former network of Stockton and Darlington Railway (absorbed by the NER in 1863), which linking Middlesbrough to lines towards Stockton and Hartlepool. Combined with the 1873 realignment of the south to east curve at Norton Junction, which eased the severity of its curvature, this massively improved the connections between Hartlepool and the rest of the Teesside region.

The rope-worked 1 in 34 incline at Hesleden Bank was realigned in 1874 to reduce the gradient to that of 1 in 52 and thus enable locomotive working over the entire Hartlepool-Sunderland route.

In 1877, the NER constructed a new chord between the ex-HD&R and ex-D&SR lines at Haswell and replaced the previously separate terminus stations with a new through station. In the same year, at Hartlepool, they also constructed a direct link between the ex-HD&R and former Stockton and Hartlepool Railway lines which skirts around the western edge of the docks and replaced a more circuitous link through them. Both the ex-Stockton and Hartlepool Railway and ex-HD&R termini were replaced by new stations at West Hartlepool (in 1880) and Hartlepool (in 1878), respectively.

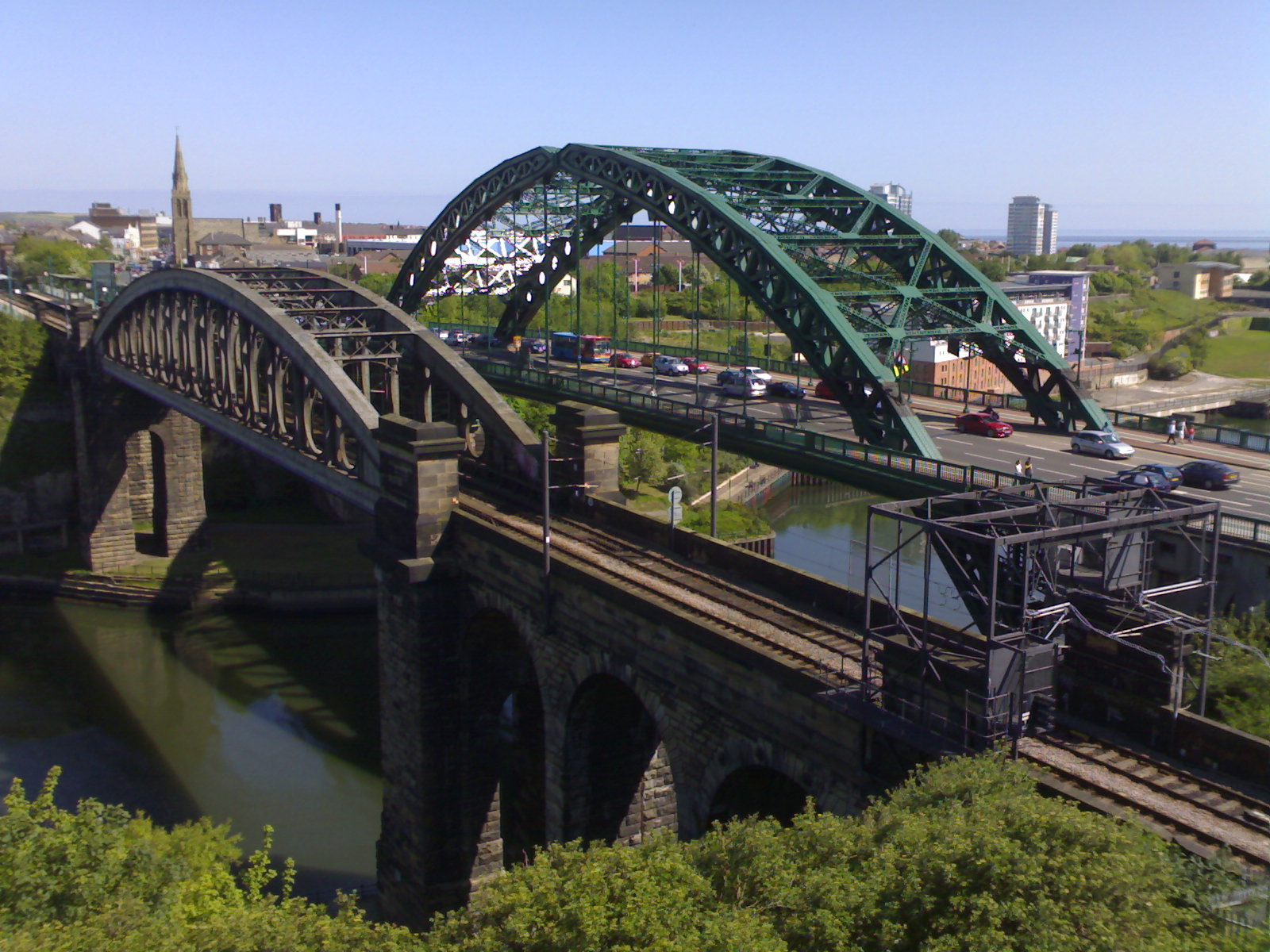
The Monkwearmouth Railway Bridge (left) alongside the Wearmouth Road Bridge (right) in Sunderland, seen in 2006.

However, of these links constructed by the NER, arguably the most significant was the Monkwearmouth Junction Line of 1879 which linked the ex-D&SR lines at Ryhope Grange Junction to the ex-BJR lines at Monkwearmouth. This involved the construction of the Monkwearmouth Railway Bridge over the River Wear, a new station at Sunderland Central, and tunnels on either side of the station. Following the opening of Sunderland Central station, NER and LSSR services were diverted away from the earlier termini and focussed in one location for the first time.

Following the completion of the improvements of the 1870s, the Durham Coast Line could be operated as a through route but, having not been constructed for such a purpose, doing so it remained challenging. One major issue was that any services running between Hartlepool and Sunderland still had to ascend or descend both the 1:44 incline at Seaton Bank, and the aforementioned incline at Hesleden Bank. To alleviate this, the NER developed plans to construct a new, more direct, line along the coast. Construction of this new line between Seaham Colliery on the LSSR, and Hart Junction on the ex-HD&R route was sanctioned in 1894–95. However its construction was contingent on the NER purchasing the Londonderry (Seaham to Sunderland) Railway route and this was not agreed until the NER agreed to pay £387,000 for it and the purchase was authorised by the North Eastern Railway Act 1900 (63 & 64 Vict. c. clxiii).

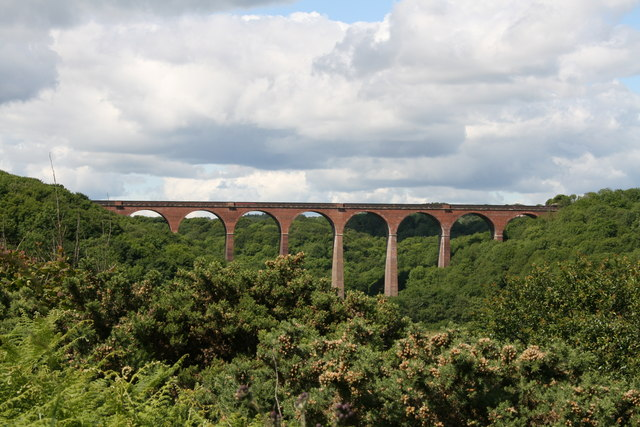
Horden Viaduct, which carries the line over Castle Eden Dene, in June 2011.

This new coastal line had to cross the denes at Hawthorn, Castle Eden and Crimdon, each requiring a substantial viaduct; one of the most imposing of these, Horden Viaduct (spanning Castle Eden Dene), is 141 feet (43 m) from ground to rail level, and consists of 10 arches, each with a span of 60 feet (18 m). The construction of these viaducts required the opening of a special brickfield and, in the case of Horden Viaduct, the creation of a temporary 800 feet (240 m) cableway spanning the valley.

The line opened on 1 April 1905, with new stations constructed at Blackhall Rocks, Horden and Easington, to serve the new villages that had been created to house workers from the new coastal collieries which came into existence thanks to the provision of the railway.

The NER became part of the London and North Eastern Railway (LNER), as part of the 1923 grouping. Despite them having already begun to experience a decline in traffic due to competition from road transport, the LNER did provide some improvements to the line. One notable improvement implemented by the LNER was the electrification of today's DCL between Newcastle and Pelaw Junction, using the 600 V DC third rail system, as part of an extension of the Tyneside Electrics system to South Shields, inaugurated on 14 March 1938. The other notable improvement during this period was the opening of additional stations at Blackhall Colliery on the NER-built Seaham to Hart line in 1936, and at Seaburn on the former Brandling Junction Railway in 1937.

=== Decline ===
On 1 January 1948, the London & North Eastern Railway became part of the nationalised British Railways, and, along with other lines in the North East, the Durham Coast Line originally became part of its North Eastern Region. The North Eastern Region would, itself, later be merged into the BR's Eastern Region on 2 January 1967.

By the 1950s, passenger and goods traffic across the country was in decline due to competition from road transport, and as a consequence, most of the earlier east–west lines from which the DCL had developed began to lose passenger services. These closures included the inland West Hartlepool to Sunderland route through Haswell (the main line between the two towns until 1905), which lost its passenger service on 9 June 1952.

However the DCL itself was not seriously affected by the closures, until it began to lose stations from 1960 onwards. Even the Beeching Report only recommended the closure of the remaining three intermediate stations between West Hartlepool and Seaham. This occurred on 4 May 1964, when stopping passenger services along this section of the line were withdrawn. Elsewhere, the Newcastle—Pelaw—South Shields route was de-electrified in January 1963 and, later, stopping passenger services on this route, and the wider DCL north of Sunderland, were downgraded to Paytrain services, resulting in most intermediate stations becoming unstaffed from 5 October 1969.

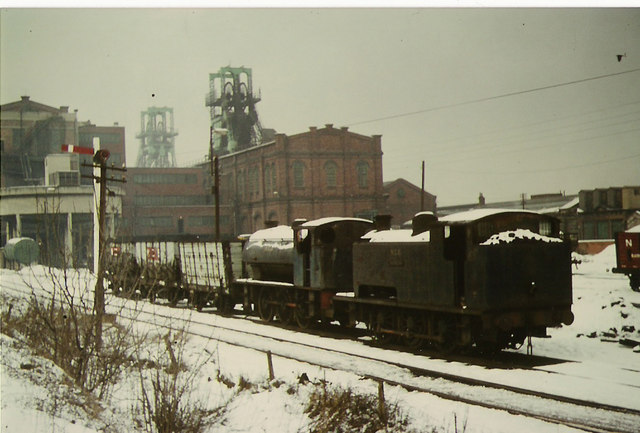
National Coal Board shunting locomotives outside of Blackhall Colliery, as seen from the Durham Coast Line in 1970.

Despite this apparent degradation of passenger services, British Rail did implement some improvements during this period, including the replacement of the original station at Billingham with a newer one, closer to the modern town centre on 7 November 1966.

Freight traffic on the line continued to thrive, whilst the collieries along the line (and a few short sections of the older east–west lines which had been retained as branches for mineral traffic) were still in operation. Owing to the relatively recent development of the coastal collieries, many of them survived until the late 1980s and early 1990s.

Nonetheless, the decline of the British coal industry meant that this traffic, too, was steadily lost, commencing with the cessation of mining operations at Blackhall Colliery, on 16 April 1981 and culminating with that at Wearmouth Colliery, on 24 November 1993.

In the early 1980s Greatham station saw its services reduced before full closure on 24 November 1991.

=== Recent history ===
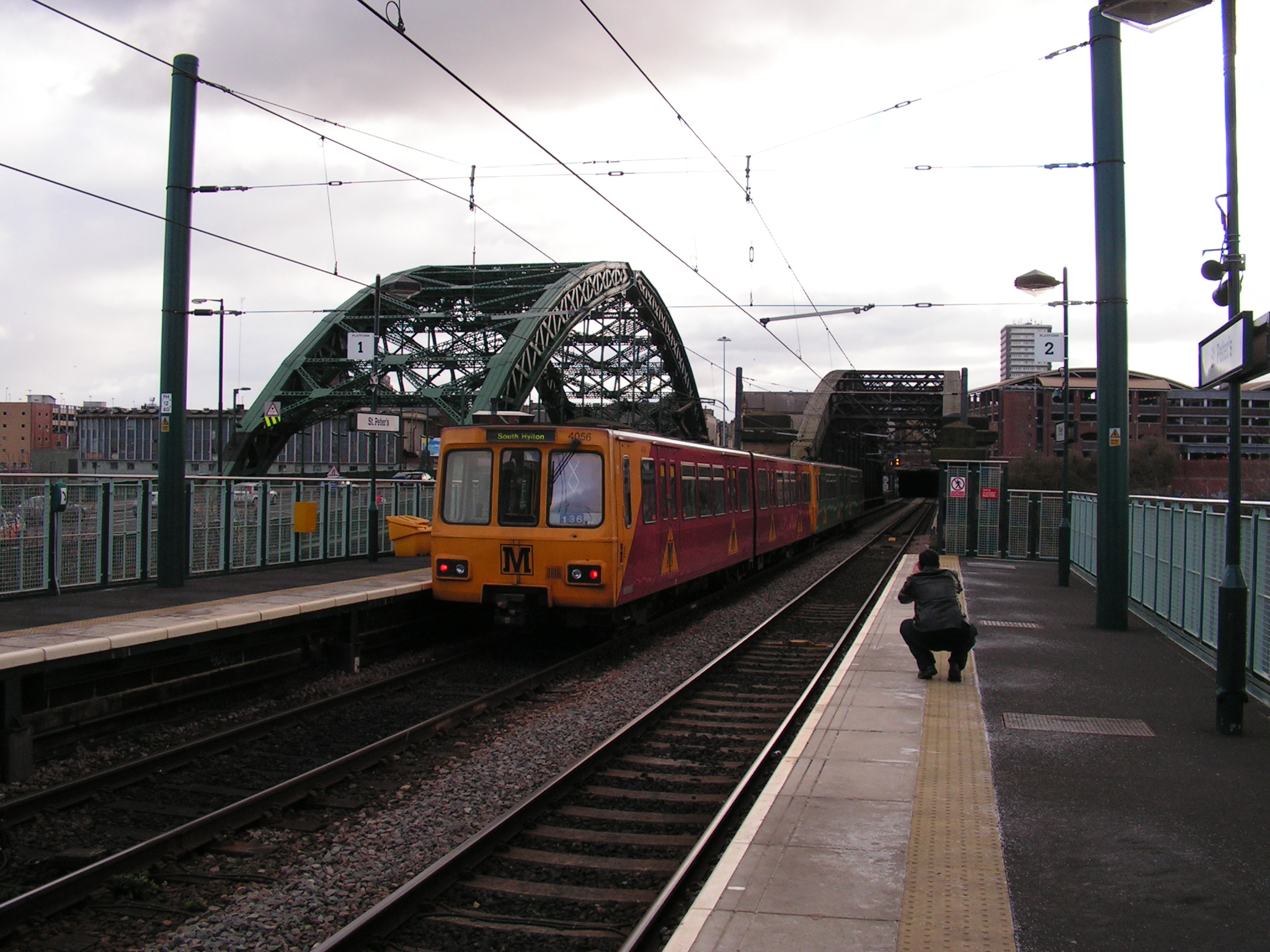
St Peter's, one of three new purpose-built Metro-only stations added to the DCL as part of the Metro's 2002 South Hylton extension. National Rail services pass through these stations non-stop.

The former British Rail stations on the Durham Coast Line at Felling and Pelaw were closed on 5 November 1979, in order to enable their conversion for use by the Tyne and Wear Metro. They were replaced by a new station at Heworth, opened on the same day. To give Metro trains dedicated infrastructure British Rail passenger trains services were subsequently diverted onto the previously freight-only relief lines which paralleled the passenger lines between Gateshead and Pelaw Junction. The Metro line between Haymarket and Heworth opened in November 1981, and as a result, the British Rail station at Gateshead was closed just one week later.

In 1996, HM Rail Inspectorate approved plans to extend the Metro between Pelaw, Sunderland and South Hylton, along tracks shared with heavy-rail DCL services, subject to funding being raised. A grant of £15 million was awarded by the European Regional Development Fund, but this was subject to the Tyne and Wear Passenger Transport Executive (Nexus) being able to obtain £35 million of central government funding. Such funding was awarded in 1999 and, along with £8 million provided by Nexus and a further £40 million invested by Railtrack, enabled construction work to commence in June 2000. As part of this project, three new purpose-built Metro stations were constructed along the Durham Coast Line at Fellgate, Stadium of Light and St Peter's, the latter of which was constructed close to the site of the long-closed Monkwearmouth station. Existing rail stations at Brockley Whins, East Boldon and Seaburn were converted for Metro services.

The project also involved the electrification of the Durham Coast Line between Pelaw Junction and Sunderland South Junction, and an upgrade to signalling on that section of the line. The non-standard electrification system used by the Metro makes this section of the DCL the only Network Rail line to still use the 1,500V DC overhead line system.

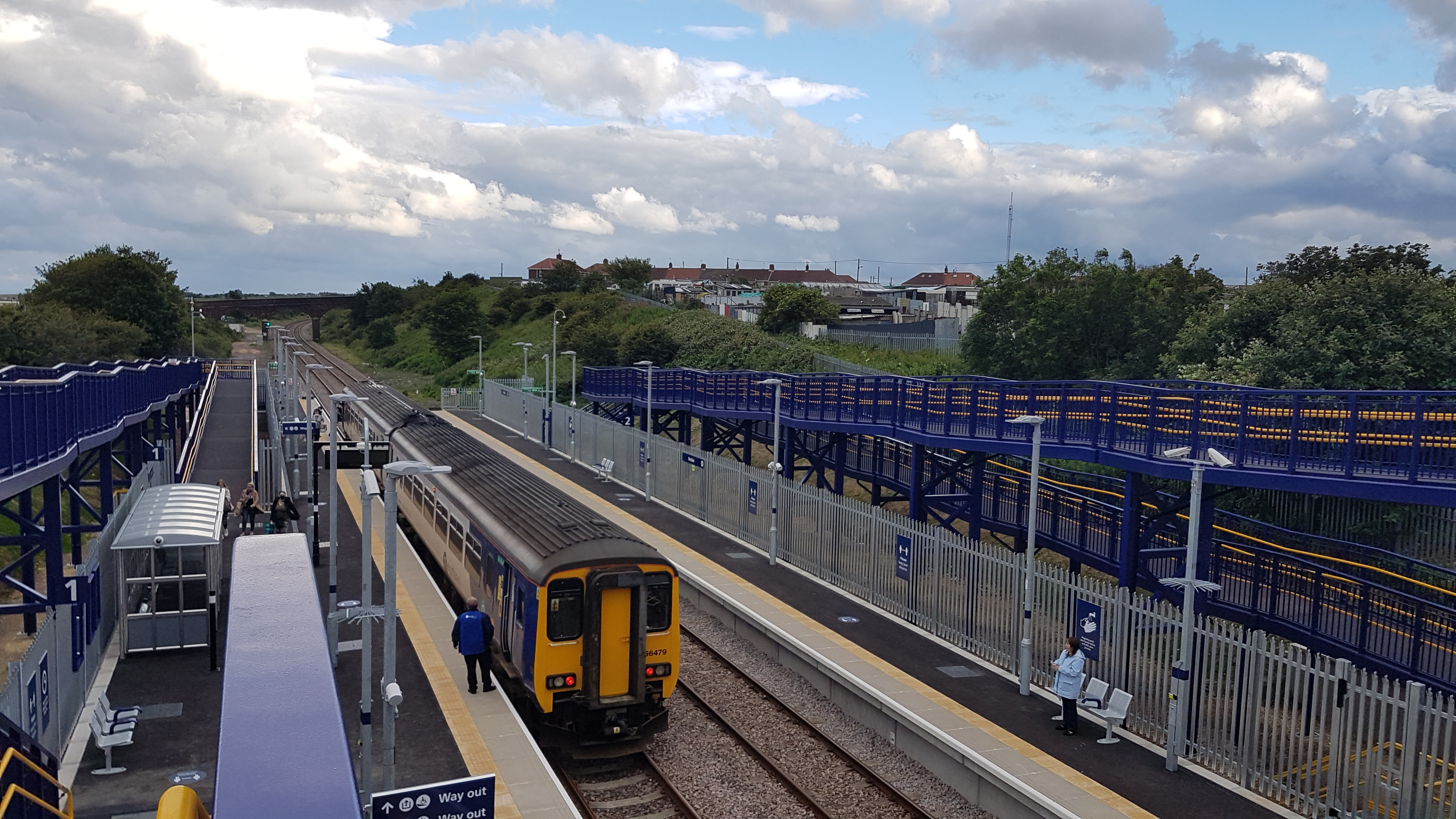
A Northern Trains service calling at the current Horden station on the day of its opening in June 2020.

Metro services were extended to South Hylton from 31 March 2002 before the extension was officially opened by Queen Elizabeth II on 7 May, as part of her Golden Jubilee celebrations.

Under the supervision of Phase 1 the Tees Valley Rail Strategy, the DCL saw service provision become hourly between Newcastle and Hartlepool from 2000. The ultimate goal of a half-hourly service and new stations (Phase 2) was put on hold when the Strategic Rail Authority came into being and funding disappeared.

After many years of development work undertaken by Durham County Council, £10.5 million of funding was agreed in July 2017 to open a new station at Horden, approximately 200 yards (180 m) north of the site earlier (1905–1964) station. This included £4.4 million from the second round of the Department for Transport's New Stations Fund and additional contributions from Durham County Council and the North East Combined Authority. After some delay, the new Horden station opened on 29 June 2020.

== Passenger services ==
As of the December 2019 change, Northern Trains run an hourly service along the Durham Coast Line between Newcastle and Middlesbrough. Most trains run through from Hexham (with some from Carlisle), and continue through to Nunthorpe (some run as far as Whitby).

Predominantly, rolling stock on the Durham Coast Line consists of Northern Trains' Class 156 and Class 158 diesel multiple units. These fleets were both introduced in the late 1980s but are currently being fitted with free Wi-Fi, power sockets, on-board passenger information displays, and an interior refresh as part of Northern's ongoing refurbishment programme. Prior to their withdrawal in late 2019, Northern Class 142 Pacer diesel multiple units had also operated on this route.

Between Pelaw Junction and Sunderland, the line is shared with the Tyne and Wear Metro, with Class 555 and Class 599 Metrocars providing up to five local trains per hour, on the South Hylton to Airport Green Line.

Other rolling stock includes Grand Central's Class 180 diesel multiple units, which provide five daily services between Sunderland and London King's Cross.

Until 2004, First TransPennine Express operated services along the northern section of the Durham Coast Line, using Class 158 diesel multiple units, as part of their service from Sunderland to Liverpool Lime Street.

Until December 2024, London North Eastern Railway operated a once-a-day service between Sunderland and London King's Cross via Newcastle, though this was disbanded due to low passenger numbers.

== Freight services ==
Despite the decline in the heavy industry in the North East of England, the Durham Coast Line still retains a regular freight service over the line. Steel coil is railed into the Tata Steel plant at Hartlepool, and pipes are then taken out to Leith, and the Far North of Scotland for the North Sea gas and oil industry. Spent nuclear rods are also railed out for re-processing at Sellafield from Hartlepool Nuclear Power Station. Cement is delivered to Seaham Docks, and scrap metal is forwarded from Stockton on Tees to Celsa EAF works in Cardiff. Tyne Dock has a trailing connection to the Durham Coast Line in both directions, near to the Metro station at Brockley Whins.

The docks at Sunderland were recently reconnected by Network Rail, in the anticipation of a return to rail traffic. A fortnightly service has operated since March 2021 transporting scrap metal to Cardiff Tidal Complex.

Despite the wide range of large industrial complexes at Seal Sands, very few of these organisations use rail as a method of transport.
