= Sunderland (Fawcett Street) railway station =

Disused railway station in Sunderland, Tyne and Wear

Fawcett Street
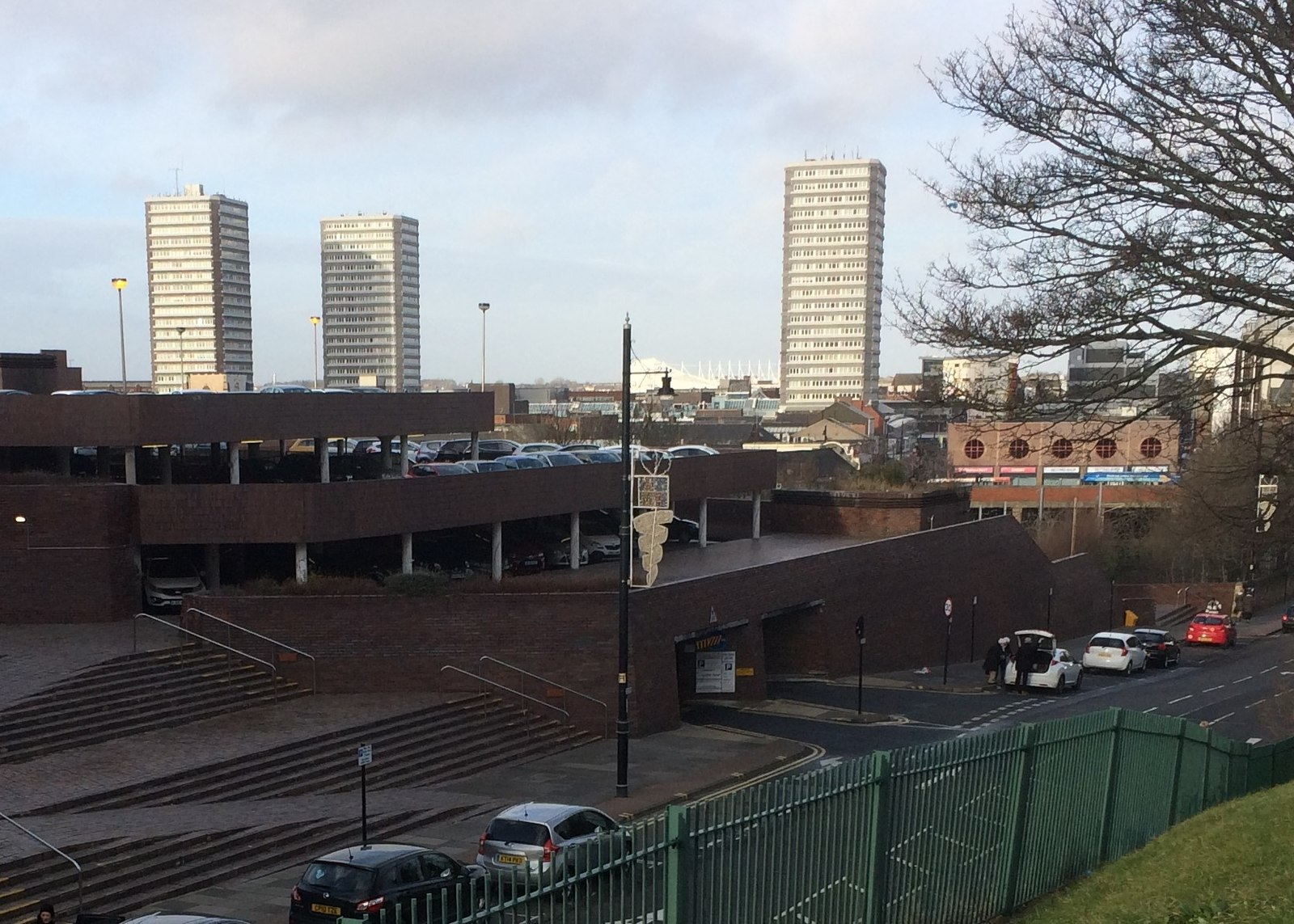
- The site of the station, looking northwest towards Sunderland city centre, in 2017

General information
- Location: Sunderland, Tyne and Wear; England
- Coordinates: 54.903°N 1.3816°W
- Grid reference: NZ397566

Other information
- Status: Disused

History
- Original company: York, Newcastle and Berwick Railway
- Pre-grouping: North Eastern Railway

Key dates
- 1 June 1853: Opened
- 4 August 1879: Closed
Location

Fawcett Street railway station served the city of Sunderland, Tyne and Wear, England from 1853 to 1879 on the Penshaw branch line.

== History ==
The station opened on 1 June 1853 by the York, Newcastle and Berwick Railway. It was situated opposite of Mowbray Extension Park. It was the Eastern terminus of the branch line, closing on 4 August 1879 after being replaced by the current Sunderland station. The site of the station was replaced by housing.

Preceding station	Historical railways	Following station
Millfield; Line and station open	North Eastern Railway; Newcastle and Darlington Junction Railway (Penshaw branch)	Terminus
