= Seaham railway station =

Railway station in County Durham, England

Seaham
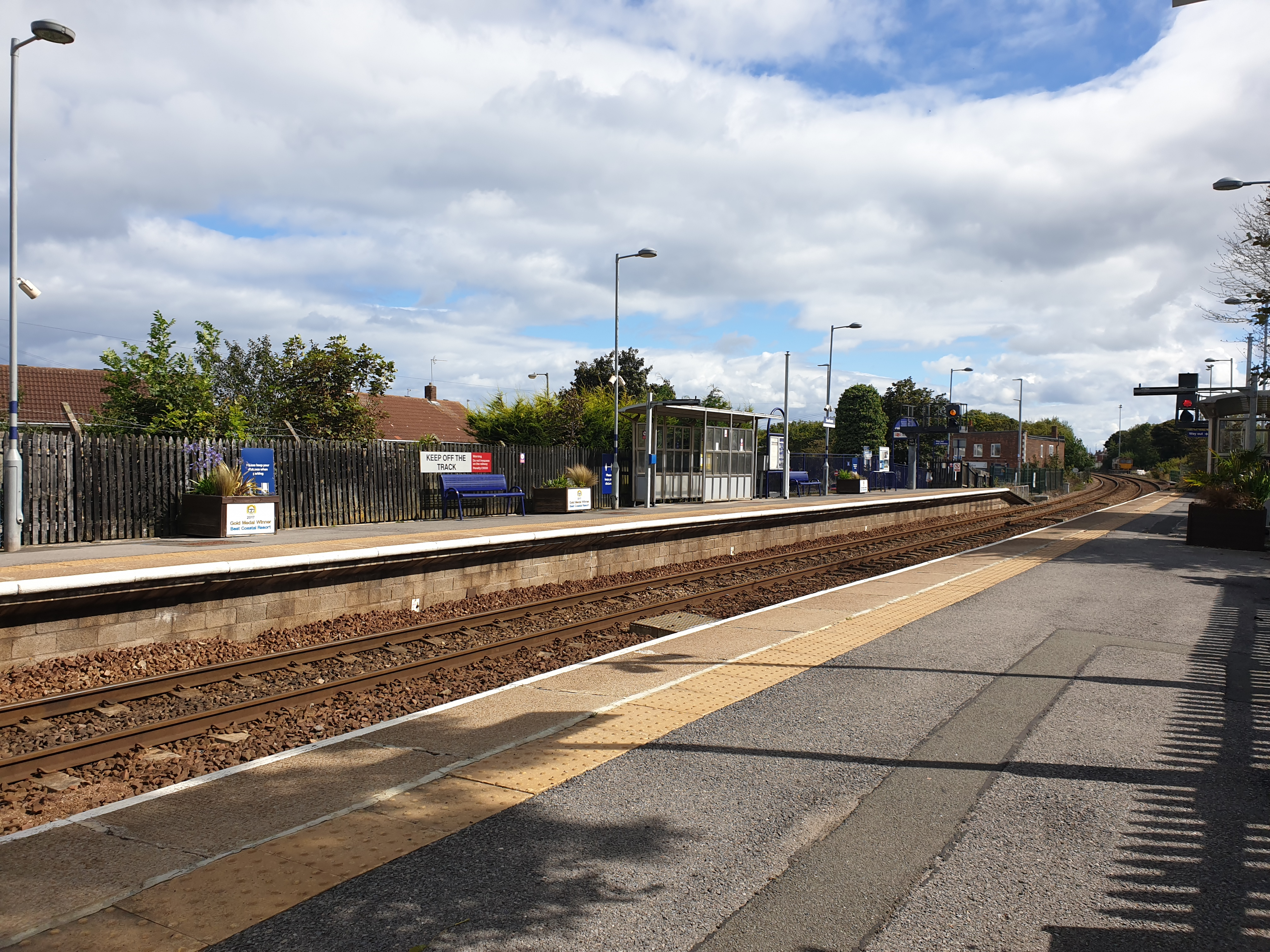

General information
- Location: Seaham, County Durham; England
- Coordinates: 54°50′21″N 1°20′47″W
- Grid reference: NZ420495
- Owner: Network Rail
- Manager: Northern Trains
- Platforms: 2
- Tracks: 2

Other information
- Station code: SEA
- Classification: DfT category F1

History
- Original company: Londonderry (Seaham to Sunderland) Railway
- Pre-grouping: North Eastern Railway
- Post-grouping: London and North Eastern Railway; British Rail (North Eastern Region)

Key dates
- 2 July 1855: Opened as Seaham Colliery
- 1 March 1925: Renamed Seaham

Passengers
- 2020/21: ▼35,228
- 2021/22: ▲103,874
- 2022/23: ▲110,570
- 2023/24: ▲145,128
- 2024/25: ▲164,994
Location
- Location within County Durham
Notes
- Passenger statistics from the Office of Rail and Road

Seaham is a railway station on the Durham Coast Line, which runs between Newcastle and Middlesbrough via Hartlepool. The station, situated 5 miles 11 chains (8.3 km) south-east of Sunderland, serves the seaside town of Seaham in County Durham, England. It is owned by Network Rail and managed by Northern Trains.

== History ==
The first railway route into the town, the Londonderry (Seaham to Sunderland) Railway, was built as a means of exporting coal from nearby collieries owned by the Marquess of Londonderry. It opened in 1854, and ran from Seaham Harbour to Ryhope Grange, near Sunderland, where it joined with the North Eastern Railway.

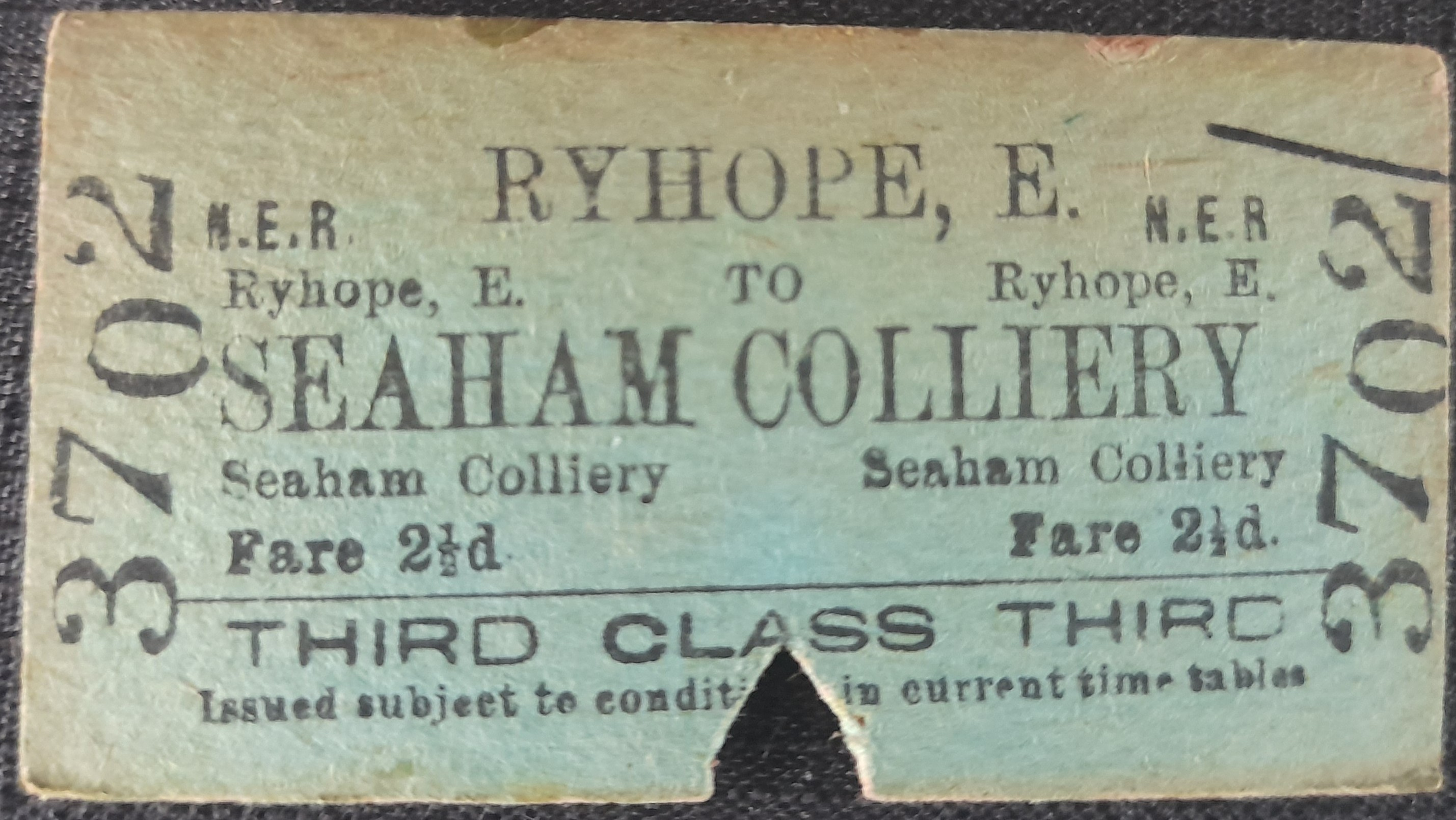
N.E.R. pre.1925 Ryhope E. to Seaham Colliery 3rd class train ticket

The station was opened to passengers by the Londonderry (Seaham to Sunderland) Railway on 2 July 1855, and was originally known as Seaham Colliery.

The North Eastern Railway purchased the line by the North Eastern Railway Act 1900 (63 & 64 Vict. c. clxiii). To create a new coastal route between Sunderland, Hartlepool and Middlesbrough, the line was extended south along the coast, with the section between Seaham and to West Hartlepool opening on 1 April 1905.

Upon the opening of the line, a new through station (current station) was constructed. On 1 March 1925, the (current) station was renamed from Seaham Colliery to Seaham. On the same day, the nearby harbour station was renamed from Seaham to Seaham Harbour, closing to passengers fourteen years later, on 11 September 1939.

== Facilities ==
The station facilities were improved during the 2010s to include fully lit waiting shelters and CCTV. The long-line public address system (PA) was renewed and upgraded with pre-recorded announcements.

The station is unstaffed, but a self-service ticket machine is provided on the northbound platform to allow passengers to buy tickets before boarding or to collect pre-paid tickets. Train running information is offered via timetable posters, digital CIS displays and automatic announcements. Step-free access is available to both platforms.

== Services ==
=== Northern Trains ===
As of the winter 2025 timetable change, the station is served by an hourly service between Newcastle and Middlesbrough, most southbound trains extend to Nunthorpe. One train per day continues to Whitby each day, apart from Sundays. Connections for the Tyne Valley, Northumberland and Morpeth lines are available at Newcastle. All services are operated by Northern Trains.

Rolling stock used: Class 156 Super Sprinter and Class 158 Express Sprinter

=== Grand Central ===
From Sunday 14th December 2025, there are four trains per day in each direction.

== Sources ==
- Body, G. (1988). PSL Field Guides - Railways of the Eastern Region Volume 2. Wellingborough: Patrick Stephens Ltd. ISBN 1-85260-072-1.
- Butt, R.V.J. (1995). The Directory of Railway Stations. Yeovil: Patrick Stephens Ltd. p. 207. ISBN 1-85260-508-1. R508.

Preceding station	National Rail	Following station
Horden	Northern Trains; Durham Coast Line	Sunderland
Hartlepool	Grand Central; North Eastern	Sunderland
	Historical railways	
Seaham Harbour; Line and station closed	Londonderry (Seaham to Sunderland) Railway	Seaham Hall Dene (private station); Line open; station closed
Seaham Harbour; Line and station closed	Londonderry (Seaham to Sunderland) Railway	Ryhope East; Line open; station closed
Hawthorn Tower Halt (workmen's halt); Line open; station closed	London and North Eastern Railway; Durham Coast Line	Ryhope East; Line open; station closed
Easington; Line open; station closed	London and North Eastern Railway; Durham Coast Line	Ryhope East; Line open; station closed
