= St Peter's, Sunderland =

Campus of the University of Sunderland, England

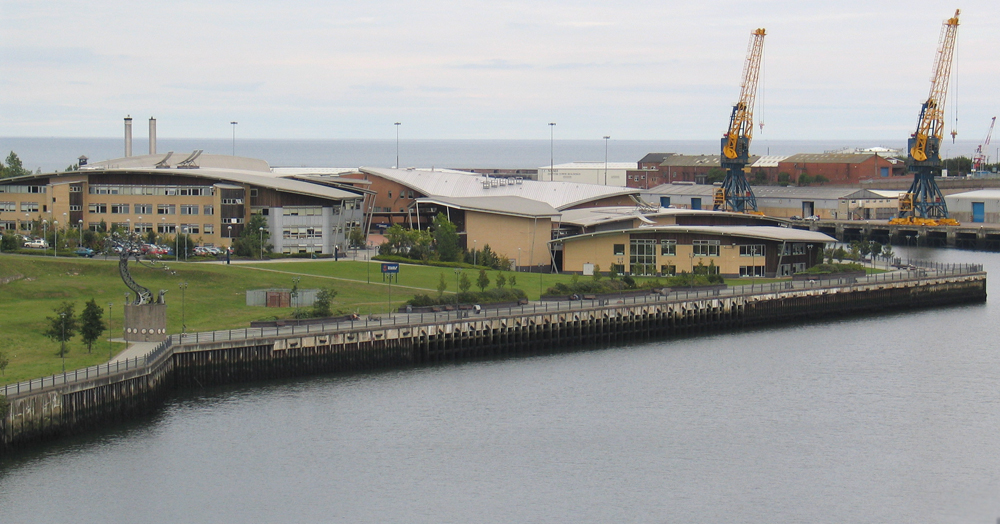
The Sir Tom Cowie Campus at St. Peter's, University of Sunderland

St Peter's is the home of the Sir Tom Cowie Campus at the University of Sunderland on the north bank of the River Wear. It is named after the adjacent St Peter's Church, Monkwearmouth.

== History ==
The area was home to a shipyard founded by Robert Thompson in 1846. After the yard passed to John Lowes Thomson in 1860, the business became known as J. L. Thompson. Following the closure of the yard in 1979, the area was redeveloped by Tyne and Wear Development Corporation in the late 1980s. The main new development was the Sir Tom Cowie Campus for the University of Sunderland. The campus was named to commemorate the life of the local businessman, Tom Cowie.

The campus was built adjacent to some of the pieces of the St Peter's Riverside Sculpture Project. Pathways of Knowledge, a pile of books located outside of the University's library, was unveiled by Queen Elizabeth II in 1993. They are a reference to Bede and the Great Library of St Peter's.

St Peter's is also home to St Peter's Metro station, part of the Wearside extension to the Tyne and Wear Metro system, which opened in 2002.
