= Monkwearmouth railway station =

Former railway station in Sunderland, England

Monkwearmouth Station Museum
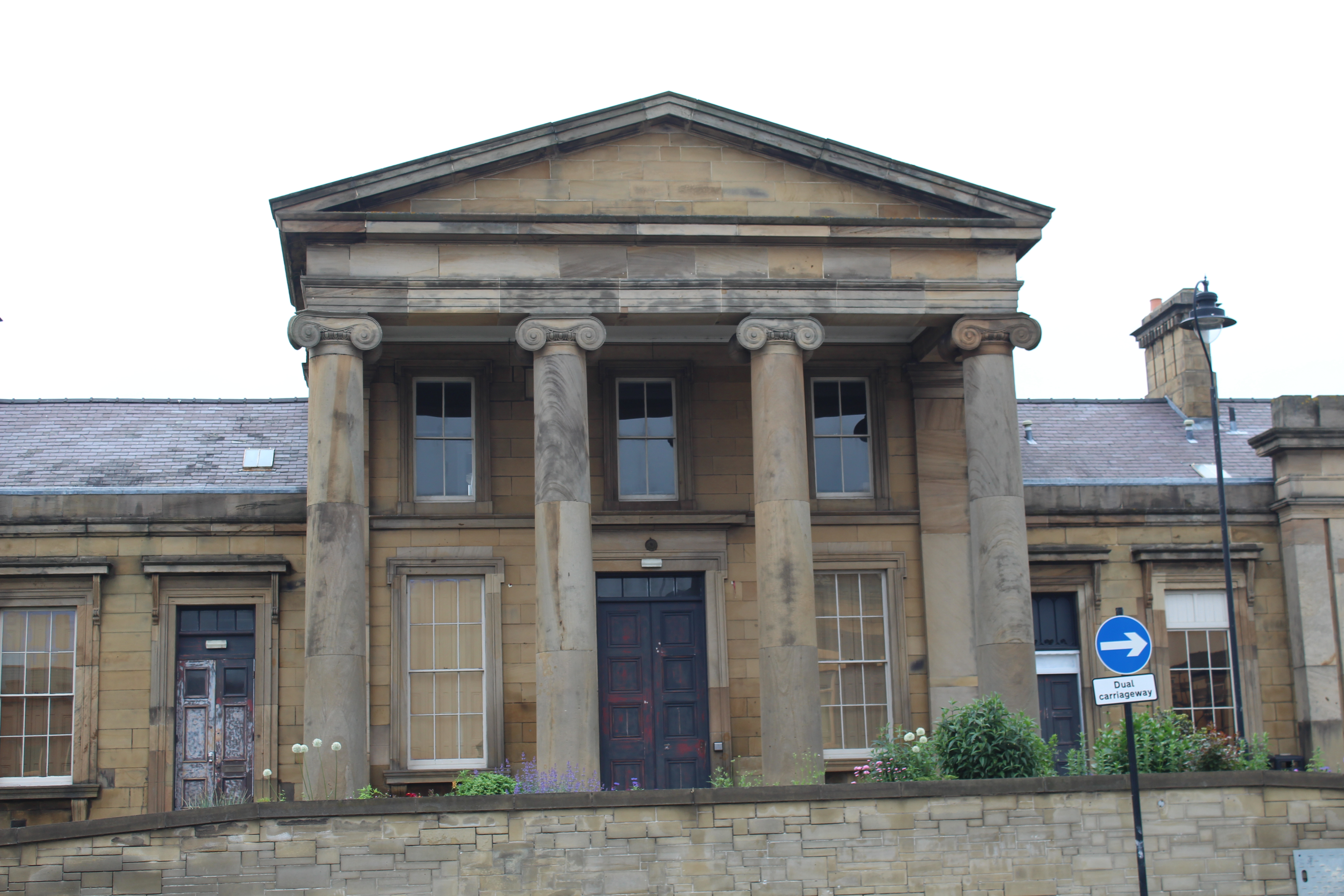
- The building in 2018

- Location within Tyne and Wear grid reference NZ39605768
- Established: 1973–2017 (Monkwearmouth Station Museum); 2018–present (The Fans Museum)
- Location: Sunderland, County Durham, England
- Coordinates: 54.9122°N 1.3839°W
- Website: fansmuseum.org

Listed Building – Grade II*
- Official name: Monkwearmouth museum of land transport with walls, footbridge, waiting room
- Designated: 8 May 1950
- Reference no.: 1209029

Monkwearmouth is a former railway station that served Monkwearmouth in the English city of Sunderland, from 1848 to 1967. It was built in 1848 to a design by Thomas Moore and was once the main railway station in the city. The railway station closed in March 1967 and featured a restored booking office dating from the Edwardian period. The building was used by the Monkwearmouth Station Museum from 1973 to 2017 and as of 2018 is home to The Fans Museum.

== Background ==
The station served the city of Sunderland from 1848 to 1967, with passenger numbers beginning to decline around the 1950s. Despite the closure of the station in 1967, the Tyne and Wear Metro and mainline trains still pass through the station without stopping, but the Metro calls at St Peter's station a few hundred yards south of the old station.

The former station is a Grade II* listed building. During its time as a museum, as well as the ticket office, visitors could explore the Wagon Shed, Journeys Gallery and Children's Gallery. It was opened as a museum by Prince Philip, Duke of Edinburgh in 1973.

The museum was temporarily closed from August 2005 until 2007 to allow repairs and refurbishment to take place. The refurbishments cost around £1 million, with a grant of £497,000 from the Heritage Lottery Fund. The museum was closed again on 31 March 2017 due to declining visitor numbers and budget cuts.

== The Fans Museum ==
In 2018 the former station reopened as The Fans Museum, which houses a collection of football memorabilia from Sunderland and around the world. The museum was closed in March 2020 during the COVID-19 pandemic but reopened in August 2021.

== See also ==
- Grade II* listed buildings in Tyne and Wear
