= St Peter's Metro station =

Tyne and Wear Metro station in Sunderland

St Peter's
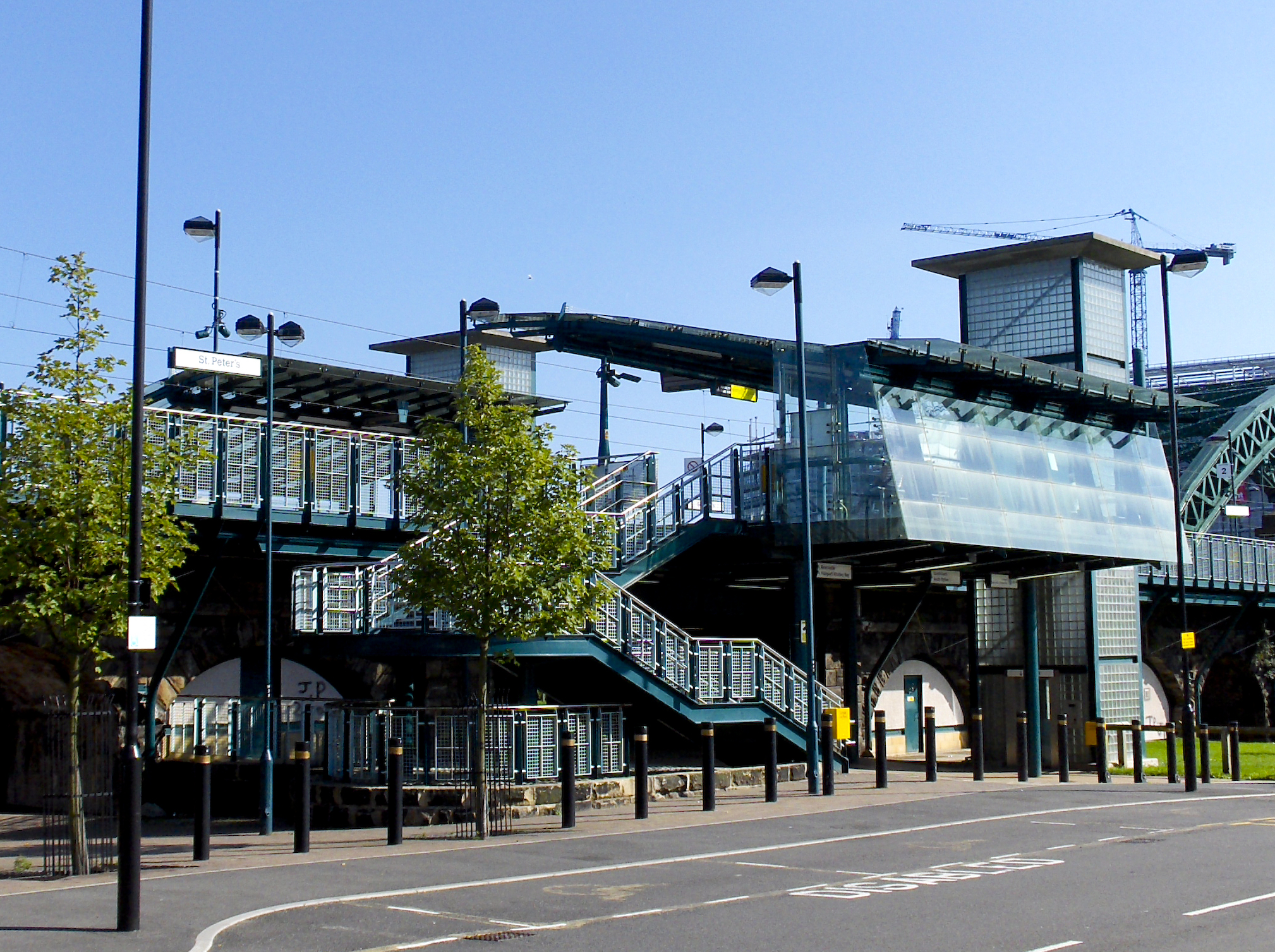

General information
- Location: St Peter's, City of Sunderland; England
- Coordinates: 54°54′40″N 1°23′02″W
- Grid reference: NZ396575
- System: Tyne and Wear Metro station
- Transit authority: Tyne and Wear PTE
- Platforms: 2
- Tracks: 2

Construction
- Parking: 23 spaces
- Cycle facilities: 5 cycle pods
- Accessible: Step-free access to platform

Other information
- Station code: STZ
- Fare zone: C

History
- Original company: Tyne and Wear Metro

Key dates
- 31 March 2002: Opened (Note: The station opened as a temporary terminus for National Rail services between 25 February 2001 and 16 April 2001, whilst Tyne and Wear Metro conversion work was undertaken at Sunderland.)

Passengers
- 2024/25: 0.264 million

Services
Preceding station	Tyne and Wear Metro	Following station
Sunderland towards South Hylton	Green line	Stadium of Light towards Airport
Location
- Location within Sunderland Location within Tyne and Wear

St Peter's is a Tyne and Wear Metro station, serving the University of Sunderland and suburb of St Peter's, City of Sunderland in Tyne and Wear, England. It joined the network on 31 March 2002, following the opening of the Wearside extension – a project costing in the region of £100 million.

== History ==
To allow for the re-building of the station at Sunderland, St. Peter's served as a temporary terminus for rail services operated by Northern Spirit between 25 February 2001 and 16 April 2001.

St. Peter's is located at the north end of the Monkwearmouth Bridge, a 300 ft (91 m) railway bridge crossing the River Wear, built in 1879, and to the south of the former station at Monkwearmouth, which closed in March 1967.

It is located a short walk from the University of Sunderland's Sir Tom Cowie Campus at St. Peter's, which is about 750 metres (0.47 mi) to the east of the station. For the University of Sunderland's City Campus, the closest station is University.

== Facilities ==
The station has two platforms, both of which have ticket machines (which accept cash, card and contactless payment), smartcard validators, seating, next train audio and visual displays, timetable and information posters and an emergency help point. There is step-free access to both platforms by lift, with platforms also accessed by staircase. The station has free car park, with 23 spaces (plus four accessible spaces). There is also cycle storage at the station, with five cycle pods.

== Services ==
As of April 2021, the station is served by up to five trains per hour on weekdays and Saturday, and up to four trains per hour during the evening and on Sunday between South Hylton and Newcastle Airport. (Note: Between 31 March 2002 and 12 December 2005, Tyne and Wear Metro services operated between South Hylton and St James via Whitley Bay.)

== Art ==
The station features the White Light art installation. Designed by British artist, Ron Haselden, it consists of illuminated ovals embedded into the glass floor, which change in intensity according to the strength of the wind.
