= Seaham Harbour railway station =

Former railway station in England

Seaham Harbour
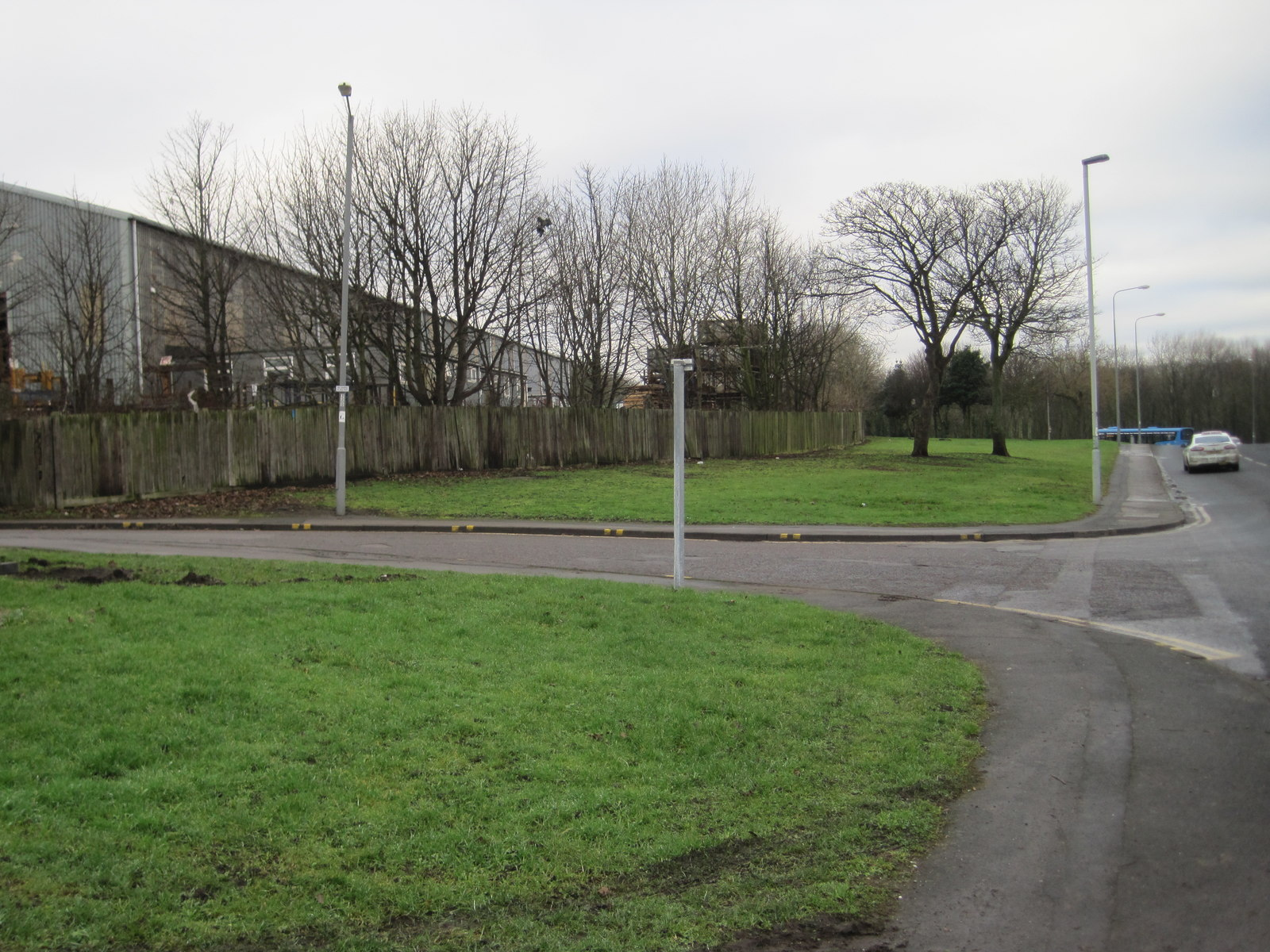
- The site of the station in January 2017

General information
- Location: Seaham, County Durham; England
- Coordinates: 54.8371°N 1.3406°W
- Platforms: 1

Other information
- Status: Disused

History
- Original company: Londonderry (Seaham to Sunderland) Railway
- Pre-grouping: North Eastern Railway
- Post-grouping: LNER

Key dates
- 1855: Opened as Seaham
- 1 March 1925: Renamed Seaham Harbour
- 11 September 1939: Closed
- 1971: Demolished
Location

Seaham Harbour railway station was a railway station that served the town of Seaham Harbour in County Durham, North East England. For much of its existence, it was the southern passenger terminus of the Londonderry (Seaham to Sunderland) Railway but declined in importance after the opening of the nearby Seaham Colliery station and the extension of the line to West Hartlepool (avoiding Seaham Harbour station) by that company's successor.

== History ==
In 1854 the Londonderry (Seaham to Sunderland) Railway (LSSR) opened to link its network of colliery railways to the newly constructed South Dock in Sunderland due to the lack of capacity in Seaham Harbour. The harbour was developed as a private port belonging to the Marquess of Londonderry for transporting the output from his mines. Though constructed primarily for mineral traffic, passengers were also carried on this line from 1855 and stations were opened at either end of the line.

At the Seaham end of the line, a station was constructed on Marlborough Street and was originally named Seaham whilst at the Sunderland end, Hendon Burn station was constructed close to the staithes in the South Dock.

From 1868, LSSR began to use the Hendon terminus of the North Eastern Railway (NER) before that was in turn closed by the NER in 1879 to be replaced by Sunderland Central station and all LSSR services were once again diverted into the new station.

The LSSR did, however, remain independent until the Marquis of Londonderry agreed to sell the Londonderry (Seaham to Sunderland) Railway to the NER in the North Eastern Railway Act 1900 (63 & 64 Vict. c. clxiii) of 30 July 1900, though this sale did not include Station Hotel which was attached to the Seaham station and had direct entrance from the station platform; the hotel remained under the ownership of the Marquess of Londonderry. The NER took over operation of the route on 6 October 1900 and then, on 1 April 1905 opened an extension of it along the coast to meet the former Hartlepool Dock and Railway at Hart. However all through trains to West Hartlepool over the extension, left the original LSSR passenger route just to the north of the original Seaham terminus, serving the new Seaham Colliery station instead and thus leaving the original Seaham station as the terminus of local trains to and from Sunderland.

In the 1923 grouping, the NER was absorbed into the London and North Eastern Railway (LNER). As part of an agreement which allowed them to close the Marquess' private station at Seaham Hall Dene, the LNER renamed both the original Seaham station and the later Seaham Colliery station on 1 March 1925, with the original station becoming Seaham Harbour and the later station becoming Seaham.

Under the LNER, Seaham Harbour station retained a fairly frequent service of 14 trains per day, despite it having been superseded as the town's main station until it was closed as a wartime economy measure on 11 September 1939 and never reopened. The station buildings remained until they were demolished in 1971.

Preceding station	Historical railways	Following station
Terminus	North Eastern Railway; Londonderry (Seaham to Sunderland) Railway	Seaham; Line closed, station open
