= Sunderland station =

Transport interchange in Tyne and Wear

Sunderland
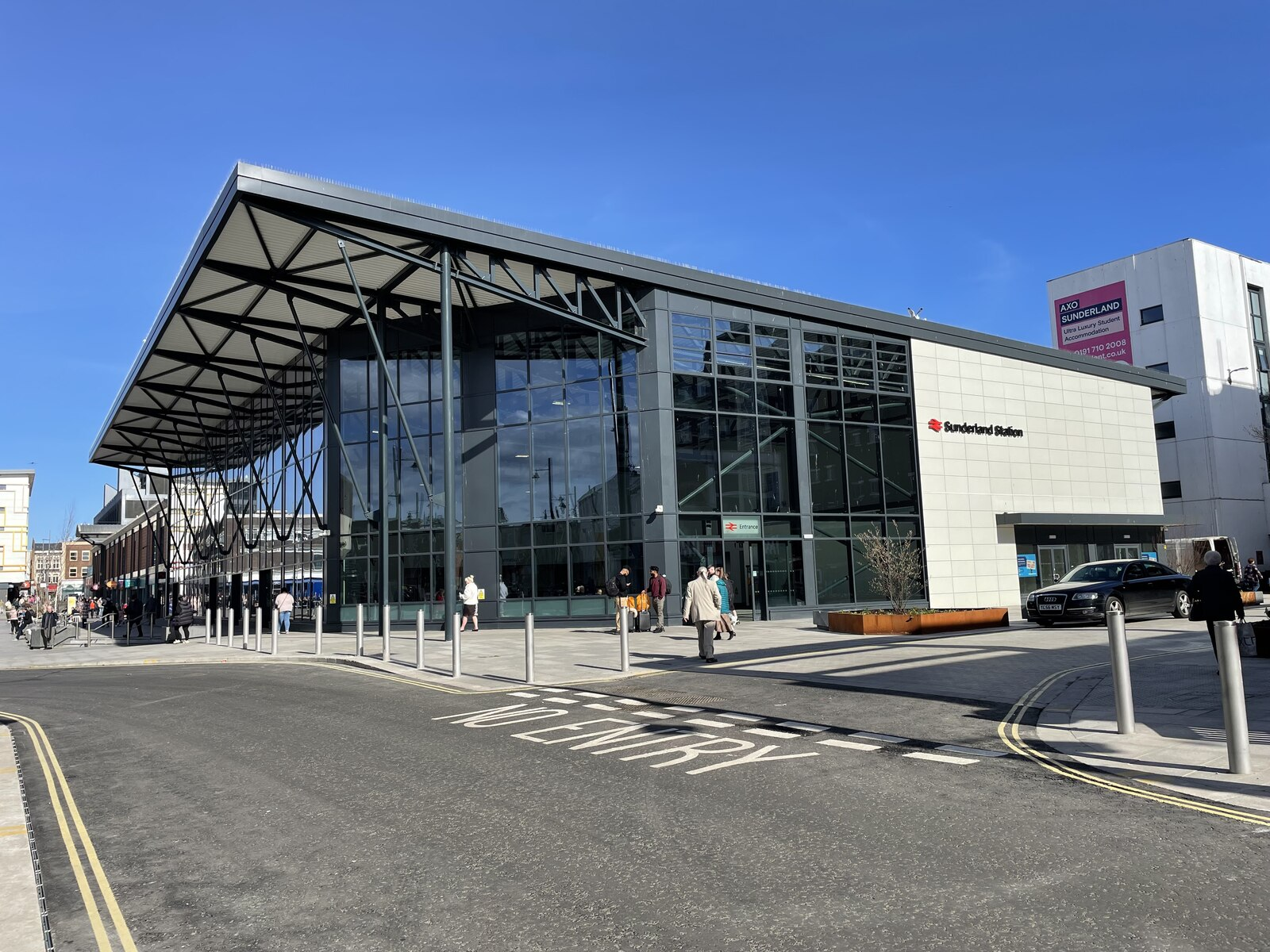

General information
- Location: Sunderland; City of Sunderland; England
- Coordinates: 54.9061°N 1.3824°W
- OS Grid ref: NZ 396 569
- System: Multimodal transport hub including Tyne and Wear Metro and National Rail services
- Owner: Network Rail
- Manager: Northern Trains
- Transit authority: Nexus
- Platforms: 4
- Tracks: 2

Construction
- Accessible: Step-free access throughout, with lifts from street-level to platforms and level-boarding to Metro trains

Other information
- Station code: SUN
- Fare zone: C
- Classification: DfT category C2

History
- Original company: North Eastern Railway
- Pre-grouping: North Eastern Railway
- Post-grouping: London and North Eastern Railway; British Rail (North Eastern Region); British Rail (Eastern Region)

Key dates
- 4 August 1879: Opened as Sunderland Central
- 4 November 1965: Rebuilt
- 5 May 1969: Renamed Sunderland
- 31 March 2002: Tyne and Wear Metro service began

Passengers
- 2020/21: ▼264,253 (Metro)
- 2021/22: ▲1.161 million (Metro)
- 2022/23: ▲1.320 million (Metro)
- 2023/24: ▲1.422 million (Metro)
- 2024/25: ▲1.514 million (Metro)
- 2020/21: ▼0.107 million (National Rail)
- Interchange: ▼998
- 2021/22: ▲0.386 million (National Rail)
- Interchange: ▲3,224
- 2022/23: ▲0.482 million (National Rail)
- Interchange: ▲4,711
- 2023/24: ▲0.599 million (National Rail)
- Interchange: ▲6,534
- 2024/25: ▲0.709 million (National Rail)
- Interchange: ▼5,702

Services
Preceding station	Tyne and Wear Metro	Following station
Park Lane towards South Hylton	Green line	St Peter's towards Airport
Preceding station	National Rail	Following station
Seaham	Northern Trains Durham Coast Line	Heworth
Hartlepool	Northern Trains Durham Coast Line	Newcastle
Seaham	Grand Central North Eastern; Sunderland–London	Terminus
Hartlepool	Grand Central North Eastern; Sunderland–London	Terminus
Location
- Location within Sunderland Location within Tyne and Wear
Notes
- Metro passenger statistics from Nexus.; National Rail passenger statistics from the Office of Rail and Road

Sunderland is a multimodal transport hub with both a Tyne and Wear Metro station and a National Rail station in Sunderland, Tyne and Wear, England. It is on the Durham Coast Line, which runs between Middlesbrough and Newcastle, via Hartlepool. It is owned by Network Rail and managed by Northern Trains. Since 31 March 2002, the station has also been served by the Tyne and Wear Metro's Green line.

== History ==
=== Earlier stations ===
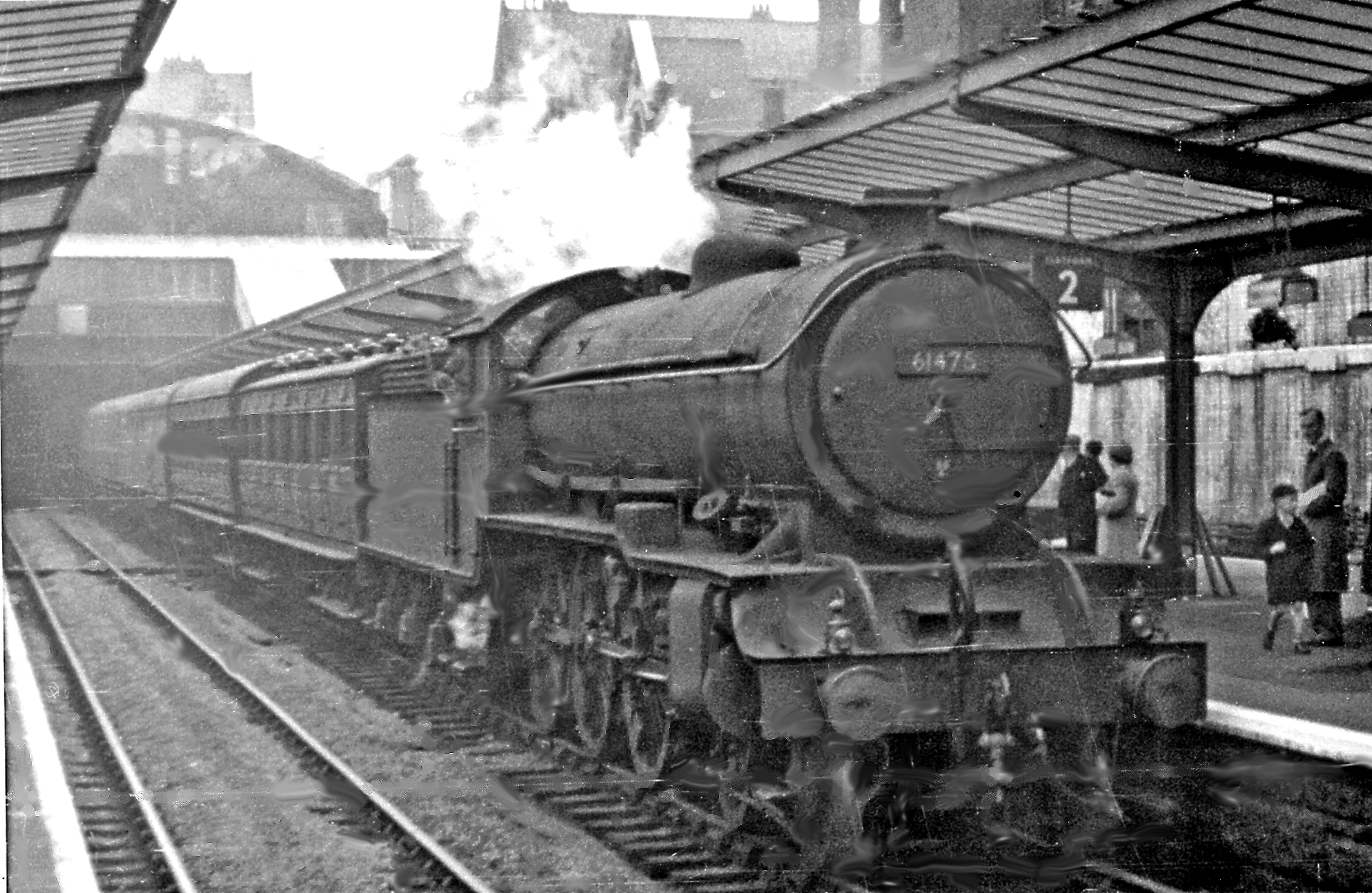
The station, prior to reconstruction, seen in June 1953.

Opening in 1836, the first railway passenger services to Sunderland were provided by the Durham & Sunderland Railway, initially linking the then port town with Haswell and Hetton-le-Hole. Approaching from the south along the coast, the terminus, known as Town Moor was located near South Dock. The Durham and Sunderland Railway Company slowly extended their route towards the intended terminus in Durham – though the eventual terminus, which opened in 1839, was located outside the city at Shincliffe Town. The line reached Durham in July 1893, when the North Eastern Railway opened the extension to Durham Elvet.

Undistinguished either in architecture, convenience or accommodation, Town Moor was replaced 22 years later by Hendon. It was situated half a mile to the south, at a point where the line had to be joined by the Newcastle and Darlington Junction Railway Company's line Durham via Penshaw, which opened in 1853.

In 1854, the Marquis of Londonderry opened the Londonderry (Seaham to Sunderland) Railway (LSSR), which linked the existing Londonderry and South Hetton Collieries to the South Dock. From 1855, the line carried passengers between Seaham Harbour and a terminus at Hendon Burn. The Londonderry (Seaham to Sunderland) Railway began to use the Durham and Sunderland Railway's terminus in 1868. Meanwhile, the York, Newcastle and Berwick Railway had built their station, Fawcett Street, which opened in 1853. It was situated just south of the site of the present station.

On 4 August 1879, the North Eastern Railway opened a line from Ryhope Grange Junction over the River Wear to Monkwearmouth, and a new station was built on the present site, to the designs of architect William Peachey. Both Fawcett Street and Hendon were closed on the same date. The new station served passengers of both the North Eastern Railway and Londonderry (Seaham to Sunderland) Railway, until the Marquis of Londonderry sold the Sunderland–Seaham route to the former under the North Eastern Railway Act 1900 (63 & 64 Vict. c. clxiii). This, in turn, allowed the North Eastern Railway to extend the line along the coast to create a new through route to West Hartlepool, which opened in 1905.

=== Present station ===
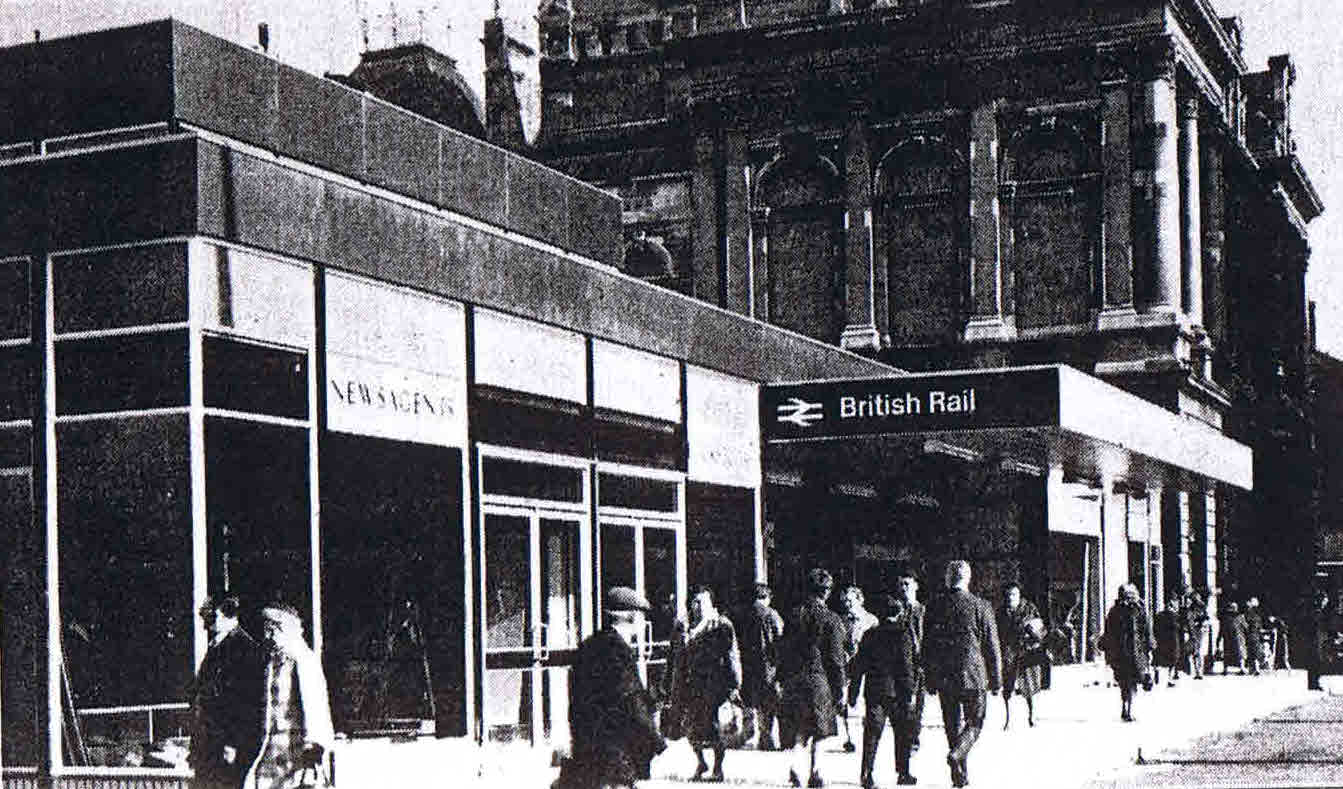
The southern entrance of the station, seen in October 1965.

The current station, known as Sunderland Central until 5 May 1969, has tracks which lie in a cutting running north and south, bounded by retaining walls to the east and west. The platform area was previously covered by an overall semi-elliptical arched-rib roof, which together with the buildings at the station's north end, suffered significant damage following an air raid in March 1943. In 1953, the roof was replaced by umbrella-type roofing, and the buildings at the southern end of the station were given an interim facelift. The complete rebuilding of the station was deferred, in order to enable advantage to be taken of the site's potential for property development, as well as to ensure compatibility with the town's proposals for the redevelopment of the surrounding area.

The redeveloped station was designed by Frederick Francis Charles Curtis of the British Rail Architects' Department, with construction completed on 4 November 1965. At the time, the development formed part of a complete rebuilding scheme involving almost the entire area of the station site, which was decked over and developed at street level. A single entrance and street-level buildings were located at the northern end of the station, with a second entrance and associated buildings at the south being added five years later.

Following the Beeching Axe, and subsequent withdrawal of local stopping train services to Durham, West Hartlepool and South Shields, passenger trains were concentrated on a single island platform, with access to the concourse area by a dual one-direction stairway. At the time of reopening, services consisted of a half-hourly service each weekday to Newcastle Central and an hourly service to and from Middlesbrough via (West) Hartlepool, with additional trains at peak periods. There were also through morning trains to Liverpool Lime Street and London King's Cross, as well as a sleeping car service to London each evening.

The second island platform was given over to the working of parcels traffic, as a new parcels office was to be built at the northern end of the station. Prior to this, parcels traffic was dealt with at the northern end of the station, using the old stables block to the west for deliveries, with a similar sized room at the eastern side for incoming parcels.

The revised station working enabled the running lines and sidings at the southern end of the station to be simplified. The consequent reduction in permanent way released areas of land at track level, which was available for the erection of support for further street-level development around Athenaeum Street and Holmeside.

Further redevelopment took place, ahead of the opening of the Wearside extension of the Tyne and Wear Metro. A six-week closure of the Durham Coast Line between Newcastle and Sunderland took place in early spring 2001, during which the existing track through Sunderland North Tunnel was lowered and two new crossovers introduced. The single island platform was also widened, with a new junction and track arrangement introduced and commissioned to the south of the station.

== Refurbishment ==
In 2006, Nexus announced plans to refurbish of the 140-metre (460 ft) platform areas. The project was to be funded by the Department for Transport in an innovative scheme in which the money 'saved' by reducing a subsidised rail service in favour of the Tyne and Wear Metro was converted into a lump sum for capital investment. Whilst Nexus does not own or manage the station (owned by Network Rail and managed by Northern Trains), the rationale for investment being that they are the station's majority operator.

Work began in January 2008, with the second stage of development commencing in September 2009. The project was completed in July 2010 – at a cost of £7 million. The project saw the construction of an entirely new floor, ceilings and lighting, substantial improvements to existing walls and a significant reorganisation of buildings and waiting areas on the platforms.

Nexus appointed Sadler Brown Architecture to develop the design, led by Arup. The project incorporated the work of three artists, Jason Bruges Studio, Julian Germain and Morag Morrison. Jason Bruges Studio have created a 140-metre light wall with individual LED units containing an animated display. Julian Germain is providing a sequence of 41 photographs of everyday items 'lost' on the Tyne and Wear Metro, while Morag Morrison is designing coloured glass wall panels for buildings along the island platform.

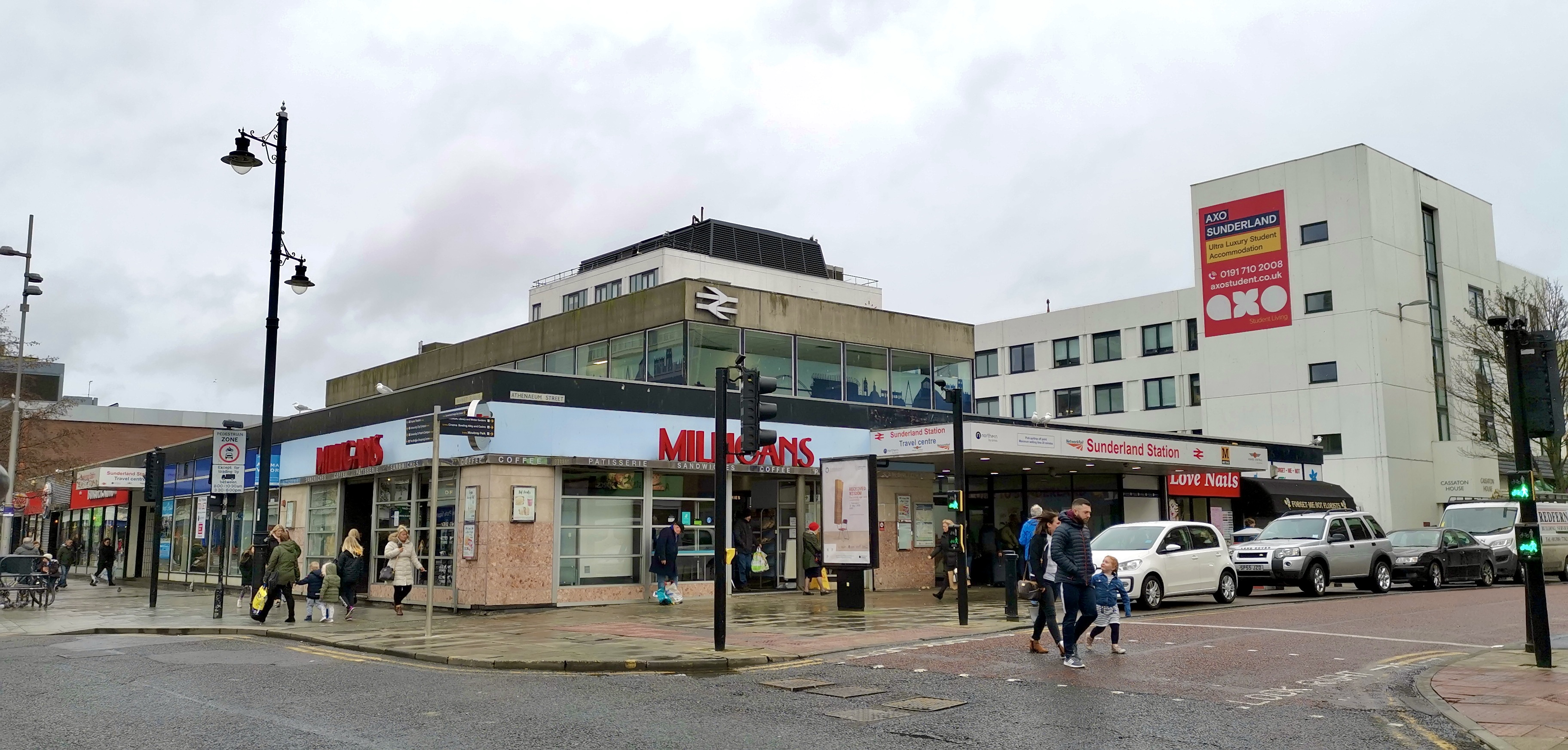
The former south entrance

In October 2015, it was announced that plans were being formulated for the refurbishment of the upper concourse and exterior to improve the station's image and accessibility. Almost six years later, in July 2021, revised plans for the refurbishment were revealed – with an estimated cost of £26 million. The six-year project would see the station's south entrance demolished and rebuilt, with the number of tracks passing through the station to be increased to four. Preparatory work commenced in April 2022, with the new southern entrance set to open in early 2023.

The delayed southern entrance opened in December 2023.

== Facilities ==
The station is on two levels. A staffed ticket office located at street (upper) level, which is open between 06:15–18:00 Monday–Saturday and 08:00–17:00 on Sunday. Retail outlets and self-service ticket machines are also located at street level. A waiting room and seating is provided at platform (lower) level, with the two floors connected by lift and escalator. The island platform is fully accessible for wheelchair users. Information is provided with next train audio-visual displays, as well as paper timetable posters.

== Layout ==
The station has a large central island platform with each side split into two numbered platforms. Services operated by Northern Trains call at platforms 1 and 4, which are located at the northern end of the station. Platforms 2 and 3 at the southern end of the station, are served by the Tyne and Wear Metro. Longer trains, such as those operated by Grand Central board from two adjacent platforms, due to their length.

Until 25 October 2018, the station's layout was unique in Great Britain, in that both heavy rail and light rail services used the same platforms. A similar layout now exists at Rotherham Central, where Sheffield Supertram tram-trains use low-height platforms, which are situated adjacent to the full-height platforms used by National Rail services.

=== Key to diagram ===
The track layout at Sunderland, as at December 2021.

- Black lines: Track shared by Tyne and Wear Metro and National Rail services, electrified at 1,500 V DC overhead line.
- Green lines: Track used by Tyne and Wear Metro services only, electrified at 1,500 V DC overhead line.
- Blue lines: Non-electrified track used by National Rail services only.
- A: Towards Newcastle
- B: From Newcastle
- C: From South Hylton
- D: To South Hylton
- E: Electrified siding
- F: Non-electrified siding
- G: From Middlesbrough
- H: Towards Middlesbrough
- Grey area: Covered station area
- Maroon area: Platforms
  - Platform 1: Northern Trains services towards Middlesbrough or Nunthorpe via Hartlepool. (Note: Grand Central services depart from platform 1 and 2, due to the train's length.)
  - Platform 2: Tyne and Wear Metro services towards South Hylton.
  - Platform 3: Tyne and Wear Metro services towards Newcastle Airport.
  - Platform 4: Northern Trains services towards Carlisle via Newcastle.

As of February 2025, southbound Tyne and Wear Metro services have been temporarily relocated to platform 1, to allow the introduction of the Class 555 fleet. This is due to the platform being out of the required alignment to allow the trains sliding step to engage.

== Tyne and Wear Metro ==
On 31 March 2002, the opening of a 18-kilometre (11 mi) extension saw the Tyne and Wear Metro network brought to Wearside – a project costing in the region of £100 million.

To the north, the track is shared with National Rail services as far as Pelaw Junction, which is situated 1 mile 56 chains (2.7 km) north of Fellgate and 48 chains (0.97 km) south of Pelaw. Existing stations at Brockley Whins, East Boldon and Seaburn were converted for use by Metro, and are no longer served by National Rail services. In addition, three new purpose-built stations were constructed at Fellgate, Stadium of Light, and St Peter's.

Heading south, services run to South Hylton along the alignment of the Penshaw–Sunderland line, which fell victim to the Beeching Axe on 4 May 1964. A total of five purpose-built stations were constructed at Park Lane, University, Millfield, Pallion and South Hylton.

== Services ==
=== Grand Central ===
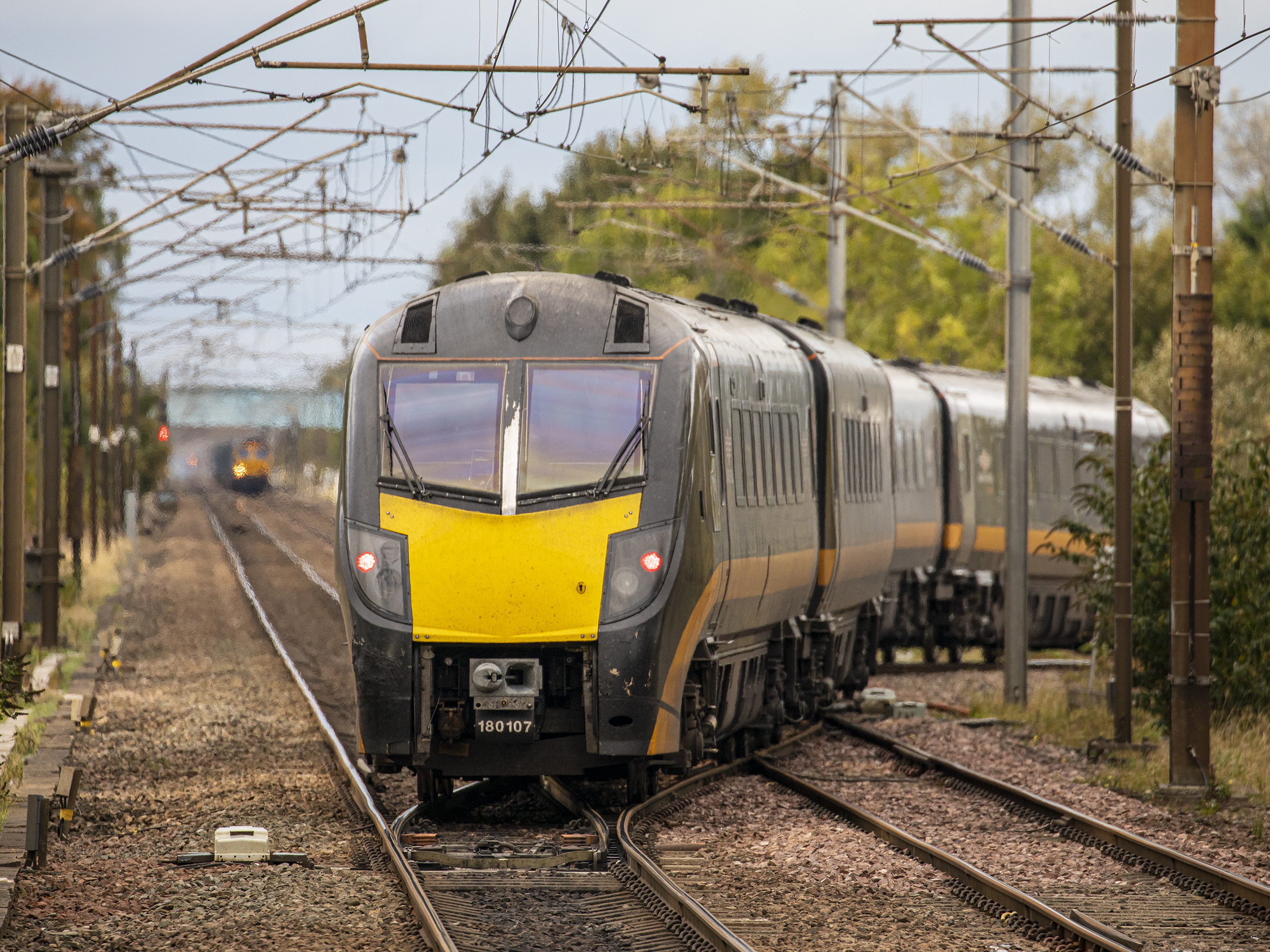
A Grand Central Class 180 Adelante on a journey to Sunderland, in late 2021

As of the May 2026 timetable change, Grand Central operate six trains per day, with five on Sundays, between Sunderland and London King's Cross, via Hartlepool and York.

All trains call at; Hartlepool, Eaglescliffe, Northallerton, Thirsk and York en route to London King's Cross. Four trains also call at Seaham and one train calls at Peterborough.

Grand Central use Class 180 Adelante trains.

=== Northern Trains ===
As of the May 2026 timetable change, Sunderland is served by two Northern services an hour on weekdays.

The first service operates between Middlesbrough and Carlisle via Newcastle Central and only calls at Thornaby, Stockton, Hartlepool and Sunderland on the Durham Coast Line. A second, slower, service runs between Nunthorpe and Newcastle Central via Middlesbrough, calling at all National Rail stations en route.

On Sundays, there is an hourly service between Newcastle Central and Middlesbrough, with a couple of trains extended to/from Nunthorpe or Whitby.

The December 2025 timetable reshaped regional services, to improve reliability by reducing the number of routes passing through Newcastle. The service between Carlisle and Middlesbrough was increased to run hourly, and now operates as limited-stop on the Durham Coast Line. The Nunthorpe to Hexham service was cut back to Newcastle.

Northern use Class 156 Super Sprinter and Class 158 Express Sprinter trains.

=== Tyne and Wear Metro ===
As of June 2026, the station is served by up to five trains per hour – in each direction – on weekdays and Saturdays, and up to four trains per hour during the evening and on Sundays. In the westbound direction, trains run to South Hylton via Park Lane Interchange. In the northbound direction, trains run to Newcastle Airport via Gateshead and Newcastle City Centre. (Note: From the opening of the Sunderland extension in March 2002, the Yellow line ran from St James to South Hylton. In December 2005, the southern branches were swapped, with the Yellow line running to South Shields instead of the Green line, which then operated between Newcastle Airport and South Hylton)

Metro use Class 555 trains.

=== Former services ===
Until 13 December 2024, London North Eastern Railway operated a once-a-day service between Sunderland and London King's Cross, via Newcastle Central and York, using Class 800 Azuma trains. This service was withdrawn as a result of low passenger numbers, low ticket sales and passenger dissatisfaction.

Preceding station	Historical railways	Following station
Seaham; Line and station open	British Rail (Regional Railways); Durham Coast Line	Seaburn; Line and station open
Ryhope East; Line open, station closed	London and North Eastern Railway; Durham Coast Line	Monkwearmouth; Line open, station closed
Terminus	London and North Eastern Railway; South Shields–Sunderland	Monkwearmouth; Line open, station closed
Millfield; Line and station open	London and North Eastern Railway; Penshaw–Sunderland	Terminus
Ryhope; Line and station closed	London and North Eastern Railway; Durham–Sunderland	Terminus
Ryhope; Line and station closed	London and North Eastern Railway; Hartlepool–Sunderland via Haswell	Terminus

== Sources ==
- Body, G. (1988). PSL Field Guides – Railways of the Eastern Region Volume 2. Wellingborough: Patrick Stephens Ltd. ISBN 1-85260-072-1.
- Butt, R. V. J. (October 1995). The Directory of Railway Stations: details every public and private passenger station, halt, platform and stopping place, past and present (1st ed.). Sparkford: Patrick Stephens Ltd. ISBN 978-1-85260-508-7. OCLC 60251199. OL 11956311M.
