= University Metro station =

Tyne and Wear Metro station in Sunderland

University
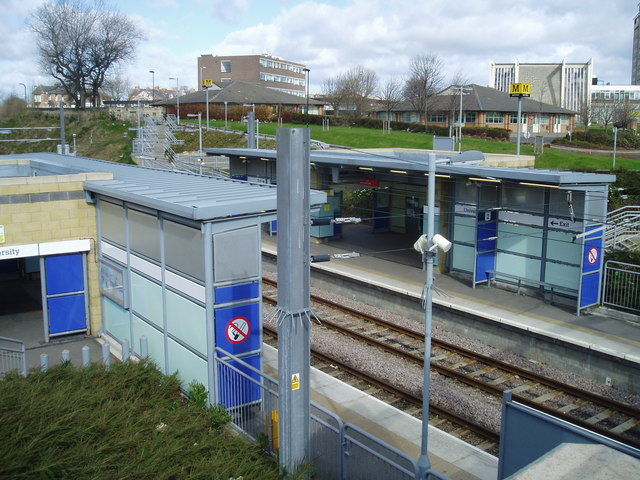

General information
- Location: Ashbrooke, City of Sunderland; England
- Coordinates: 54°54′10″N 1°23′32″W
- Grid reference: NZ390566
- System: Tyne and Wear Metro station
- Transit authority: Tyne and Wear PTE
- Platforms: 2
- Tracks: 2

Construction
- Cycle facilities: 6 cycle pods
- Accessible: Step-free access to platform

Other information
- Fare zone: C

History
- Original company: Tyne and Wear Metro

Key dates
- 31 March 2002: Opened

Passengers
- 2024/25: 0.430 million

Services
Preceding station	Tyne and Wear Metro	Following station
Millfield towards South Hylton	Green line	Park Lane towards Airport
Location
- Location within Sunderland Location within Tyne and Wear

University is a Tyne and Wear Metro station, serving the University of Sunderland and suburb of Ashbrooke, City of Sunderland in Tyne and Wear. It joined the network on 31 March 2002, following the opening of the extension from Pelaw to South Hylton.

== History ==
The station is located on the alignment of the former Penshaw branch of the York, Newcastle and Berwick Railway, the line having closed to passengers in May 1964, following the Beeching Axe.

University is the nearest station to the University of Sunderland's City Campus, with the campus located about 300 m (980 ft) north east of the station. The University of Sunderland is also served by the station at St. Peter's – this being the nearest to The Sir Tom Cowie Campus at St. Peter's.

Along with other stations on the line between Fellgate and South Hylton, the station is fitted with vitreous enamel panels designed by artist, Morag Morrison. Each station uses a different arrangement of colours, with strong colours used in platform shelters and ticketing areas, and a more neutral palate for external elements.

== Facilities ==
Step-free access is available at all stations across the Tyne and Wear Metro network, with ramped access to both platforms at University. The station is equipped with ticket machines, waiting shelter, seating, next train information displays, timetable posters, and an emergency help point on both platforms. Ticket machines are able to accept payment with credit and debit card (including contactless payment), notes and coins. The station is also fitted with smartcard validators, which feature at all stations across the network.

There is no dedicated car parking available at the station. There is the provision for cycle parking, with six cycle pods available for use.

== Services ==
As of April 2021, the station is served by up to five trains per hour on weekdays and Saturday, and up to four trains per hour during the evening and on Sunday.
