= Stadium of Light Metro station =

Tyne and Wear Metro station in Sunderland

Stadium of Light
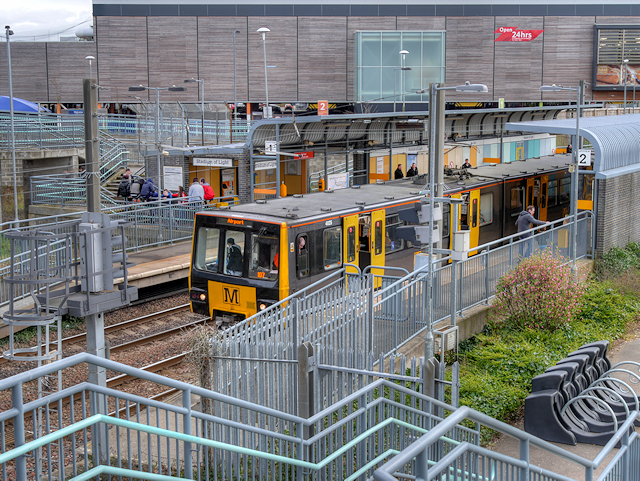

General information
- Location: Monkwearmouth, City of Sunderland; England
- Coordinates: 54°55′05″N 1°22′59″W
- Grid reference: NZ396583
- System: Tyne and Wear Metro station
- Transit authority: Tyne and Wear PTE
- Platforms: 2
- Tracks: 2

Construction
- Parking: 182 spaces
- Cycle facilities: 5 cycle pods
- Accessible: Step-free access to platform

Other information
- Station code: SFC
- Fare zone: C

History
- Original company: Tyne and Wear Metro

Key dates
- 31 March 2002: Opened

Passengers
- 2024/25: 0.600 million

Services
| Preceding station | Tyne and Wear Metro | Following station |
|---|---|---|
| St Peter's towards South Hylton | Green line | Seaburn towards Airport |
Location
- Location within Sunderland Location within Tyne and Wear

Stadium of Light is a Tyne and Wear Metro station, serving the Stadium of Light and suburbs of Roker and Monkwearmouth, City of Sunderland in Tyne and Wear. It joined the network on 31 March 2002, following the opening of the extension from Pelaw to South Hylton.

== History ==
The station is named after the nearby Stadium of Light, the home stadium of Sunderland A.F.C., which is located about 700 metres south west of the station. Despite the station's name, the nearby station at St Peter's is located closer to the stadium.

In July 2017, the station was decorated in red and white stripes, the colours of Sunderland A.F.C., to celebrate 20 years of the Stadium of Light.

== Facilities ==
Step-free access is available at all stations across the Tyne and Wear Metro network, with ramped access to both platforms at Stadium of Light. The station is equipped with ticket machines, waiting shelter, seating, next train information displays, timetable posters, and an emergency help point on both platforms. Ticket machines are able to accept payment with credit and debit card (including contactless payment), notes and coins. The station is also fitted with smartcard validators, which feature at all stations across the network.

There is a pay and display car parking available at the station, with 182 spaces, plus 12 accessible spaces. There is also the provision for cycle parking, with five cycle pods available for use.

== Services ==
As of April 2021, the station is served by up to five trains per hour on weekdays and Saturday, and up to four trains per hour during the evening and on Sunday.
