= Tyne and Wear Metro =

Rail network in north-east England

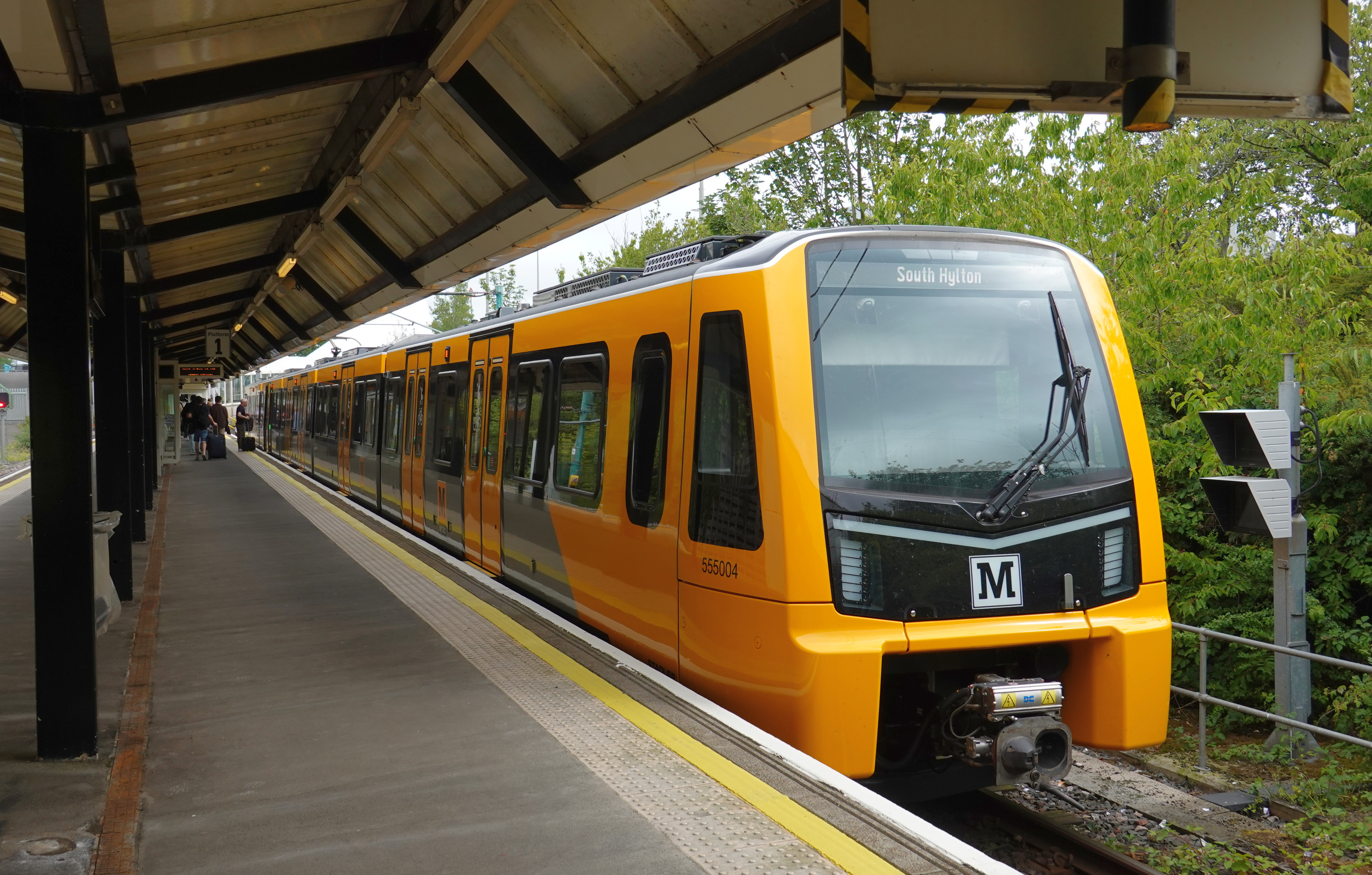
- A Class 555 at Newcastle Airport

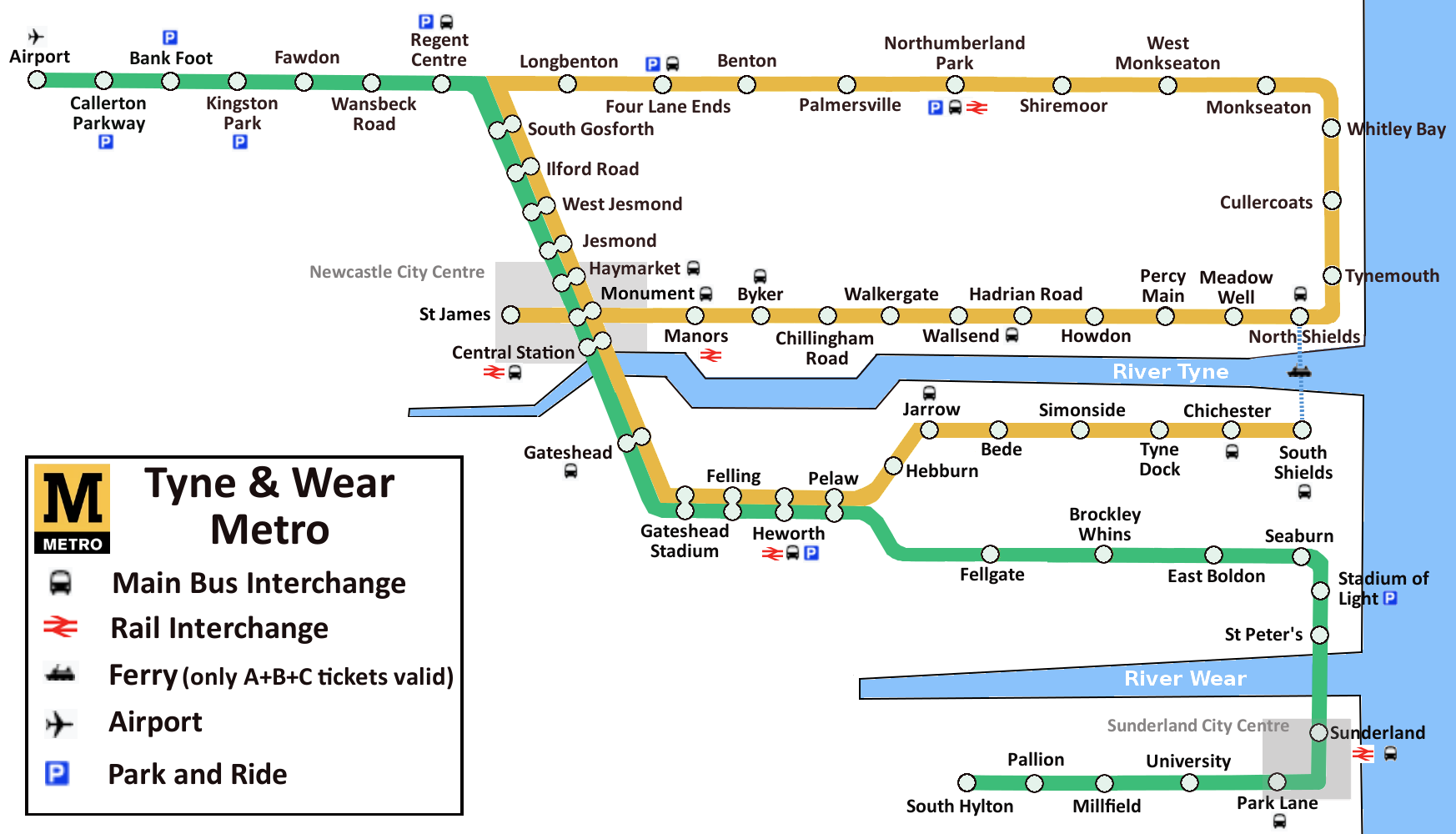
- System map of the Tyne and Wear Metro network.

Overview
- Owner: Nexus
- Area served: Newcastle upon Tyne; Gateshead; North Tyneside; South Tyneside; Sunderland
- Locale: Tyne and Wear
- Transit type: Light rail; Rapid transit
- Number of lines: 2
- Number of stations: 60
- Annual ridership: 31.5 million (2025/26) ▲2%
- Headquarters: Station Road; Gosforth; Newcastle upon Tyne
- Website: www.nexus.org.uk/metro

Operation
- Began operation: 11 August 1980; 46 years ago
- Operator: Nexus
- Number of vehicles: 46 Class 555; Class 599 Metrocar (occasional use)
- Train length: Class 555: 5 cars; Metrocars: 4 cars (2 units coupled)

Technical
- System length: 77.5 km (48.2 mi)
- No. of tracks: 2
- Track gauge: 4 ft 8 1/2 in (1,435 mm) standard gauge
- Electrification: Overhead line, 1,500 V DC
- Top speed: 80 km/h (50 mph)

The Tyne and Wear Metro is a light rail rapid transit system serving Newcastle upon Tyne, Gateshead, North Tyneside, South Tyneside, and Sunderland (together forming Tyne and Wear). The owners Nexus have described it as "Britain's first light rapid transit system". The system is owned and operated by Nexus.

The Metro was originally conceived during the early 1970s, incorporating much of the infrastructure formerly used by the Tyneside Electrics suburban network, with some elements dating back as far as 1834. Construction work began in 1974, the majority of this activity being centred on the building of new tunnels and bridges that linked with several preexisting railway lines that were converted. In parallel, a purpose-built fleet of Metrocars was procured. The first section of the Tyne and Wear Metro was opened during August 1980, and construction of the original network was completed in March 1984. Early on, Metro operations were integrated with local bus services, although this practice ended with the deregulation of the buses during the mid-1980s.

Multiple extensions to the original network were promptly worked upon; the first of these, from Bank Foot to Newcastle Airport, was opened during November 1991. A second extension, from Pelaw to South Hylton via Sunderland, was completed in March 2002. By 2013, the network comprised a total of 60 stations (these being a mixture of underground and above-ground stations) across two lines, covering 77.5 km (48.2 mi) of track. While the Metro has largely been operated by Nexus directly, for a period between 2010 and 2017, it was operated under a concession by DB Regio instead; upon the expiry of the contract, it returned to being operated by Nexus.

During 2016, Nexus launched a programme to replace its existing rolling stock, which dates back to the system's opening in 1980. Under the Metro Flow scheme, announced in March 2020, works costing £103 million are to increase the service frequency from five to six trains per hour, reduce journey times and improve reliability levels. The first Class 555 train entered passenger service on 18 December 2024, while routine Class 599 Metrocar passenger service ended on 26 June 2026.

== History ==
=== Predecessor ===
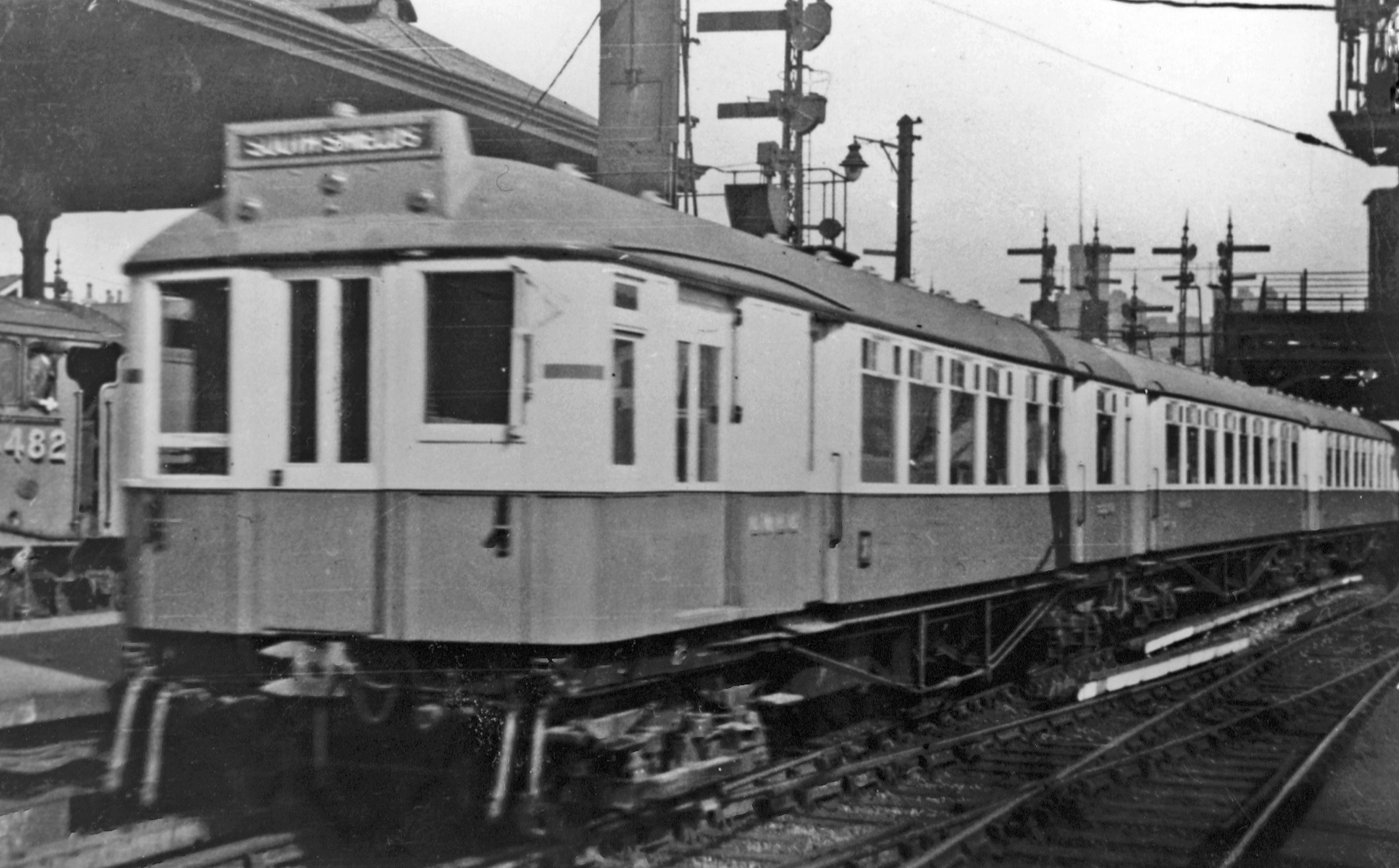
A South Tyneside NER electric unit at Newcastle Central station in 1938

The present system uses much former railway infrastructure, mostly constructed between 1834 and 1882, one of the oldest parts being the Newcastle and North Shields Railway, which opened in 1839. During 1904, in response to tramway competition, the North Eastern Railway started electrifying parts of their local railway network north of the River Tyne with a 600 V DC third-rail system, forming one of the earliest suburban electric networks, known as the Tyneside Electrics. In 1938, the line south of the Tyne between Newcastle and South Shields was also electrified.

Under British Rail in the 1960s, the decision was made to de-electrify the Tyneside network and convert it to diesel operation, owing to falling passenger numbers and the cost of renewing end-of-life electrical infrastructure and rolling stock. The Newcastle to South Shields line was de-electrified in 1963, followed by the North Tyneside routes in 1967. This was widely viewed as a backward step, as the diesel trains were slower than the electric trains they replaced.

=== Planning and construction ===
Tyneside Metropolitan Railway Act 1973
- Act of Parliament
- Parliament of the United Kingdom
- Long title: An Act to empower the Tyneside Passenger Transport Executive to construct works and to acquire lands; to authorise the Executive to enter into agreements with the British Railways Board with respect to certain existing railways of the Board including provision for the determination of questions arising concerning the alteration, maintenance and operation thereof for rapid transit; to confer general powers upon the Executive with respect to the rapid transit railway and their general undertaking; and for other purposes.
- Citation: 1973 c. xxxii

Dates
- Royal assent: 25 July 1973

Status: Current legislation

Text of the Tyneside Metropolitan Railway Act 1973 as in force today (including any amendments) within the United Kingdom, from legislation.gov.uk.

During the early 1970s, the poor local transport system was identified as one of the main factors holding back the region's economy, and in 1971 a study was commissioned by the recently created Tyneside Passenger Transport Executive (now known as Nexus) into how the transport system could be improved. This study recommended reviving the badly run-down former Tyneside Electrics network by converting it into an electrified rapid transit system, which would include a new underground section to better serve the busy central areas of Newcastle and Gateshead, as it was felt that the existing rail network didn't serve these areas adequately. This new system was intended to be the core of a new integrated transport network, with buses acting as feeders to purpose-built transport interchanges. The plans were approved by the Tyneside Metropolitan Railway Act 1973 (c. xxxii), which was passed by Parliament in July. Around 70% of the funding for the scheme came from a central government grant, with the remainder coming from local sources.

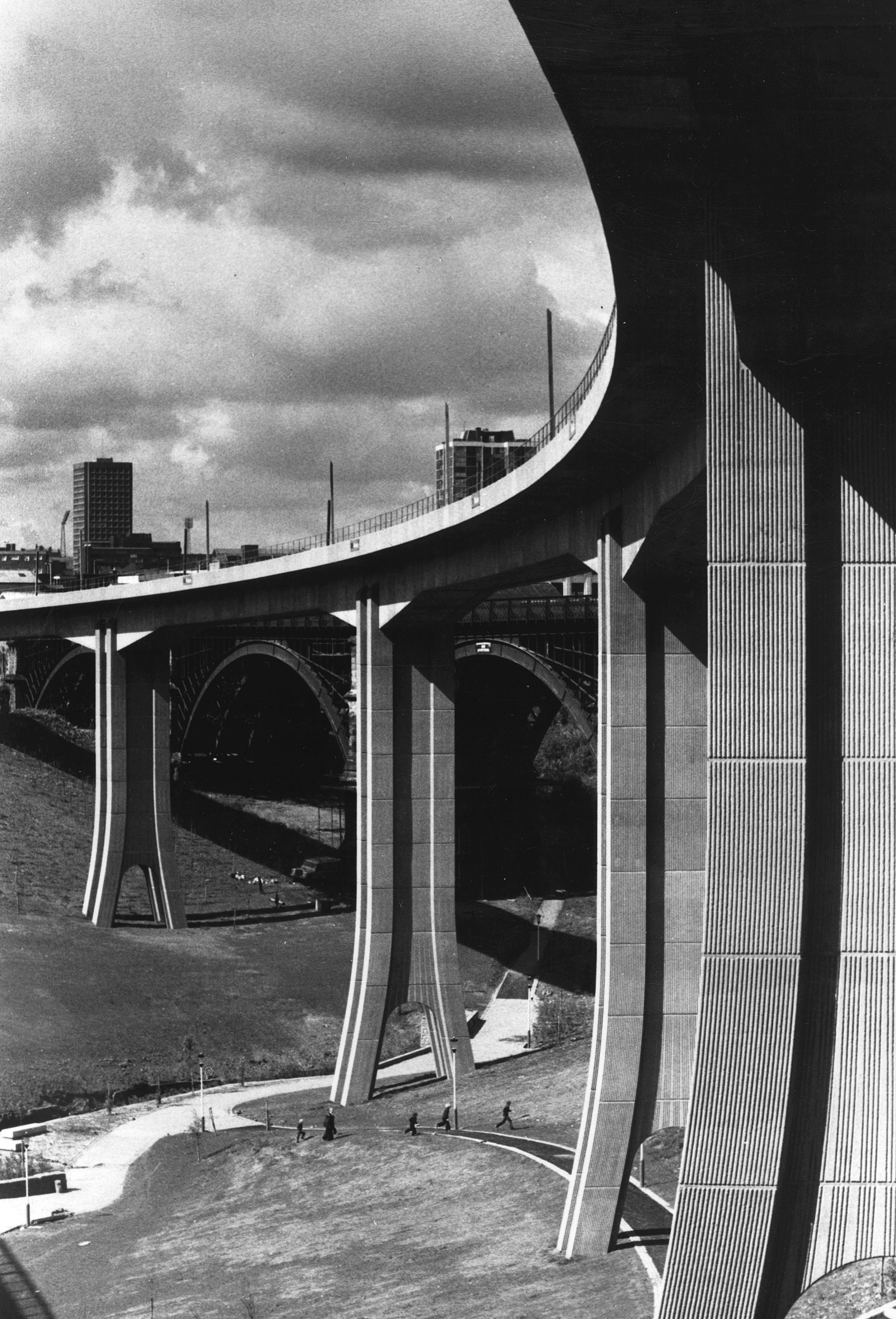
The Byker Viaduct was the first in Britain to be built using cantilevered concrete sections with joints glued with epoxy resin.

Three railway lines, totalling 42 kilometres (26 mi) were to be converted into Metro lines as part of the initial system – these being the North Tyneside Loop and Newcastle to South Shields branch (both of which were formerly part of the Tyneside Electrics network), and a short stretch of the freight-only Ponteland Railway between South Gosforth and Bank Foot, which had not seen any passenger traffic since 1929.

The converted railway lines were to be connected by around 10 km (6 mi) of new infrastructure, which was built both to separate the Metro from the existing rail network, and also to create the new underground routes under Newcastle and Gateshead. Around 6 km (4 mi) of the new infrastructure was in tunnels, whilst the remainder was either at ground level or elevated. The elevated sections included the Queen Elizabeth II Bridge, a new 350 m (1,150 ft) bridge carrying the Metro across the River Tyne, and the 815 m (2,674 ft) Byker Viaduct across the Ouseburn Valley, between Byker and Manors.

Construction work began in October 1974. This involved the construction of the new infrastructure, re-electrifying the routes with overhead line equipment, the upgrading or relocation of existing stations, and the construction of several new stations, some of which were underground. By 1984, the final cost of the project was £265 million (equivalent to £890 million in 2024). The Tyne and Wear Metro was the first railway in the United Kingdom to operate using the metric system, with all speeds and distances stated in metric units only. It was also the first transport system in the United Kingdom to be designed to be fully accessible to passengers with disabilities, with step-free access available at all stations across the network.

Construction of the Metro
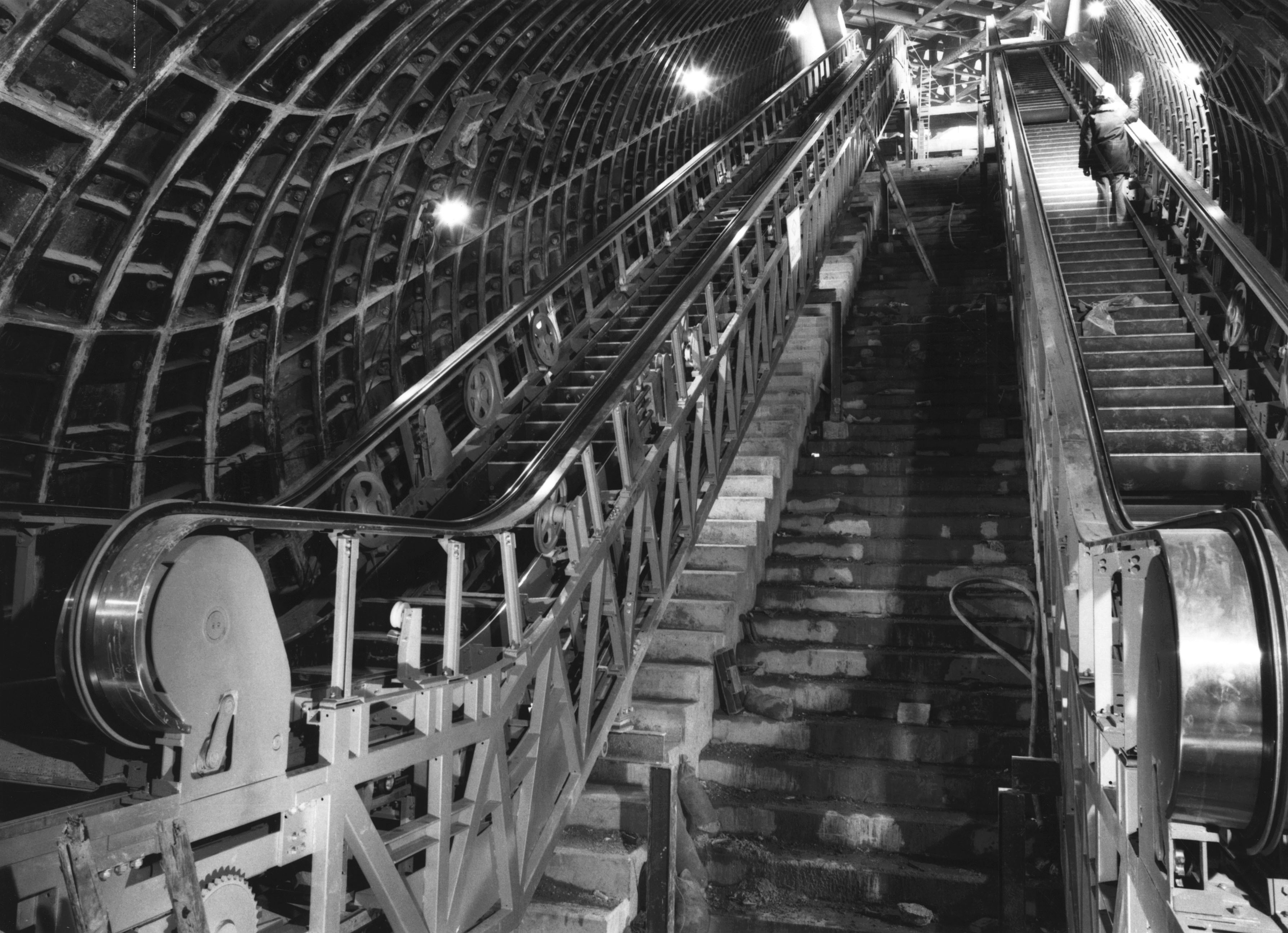
The escalator shaft at Haymarket, under construction in the late 1970s.

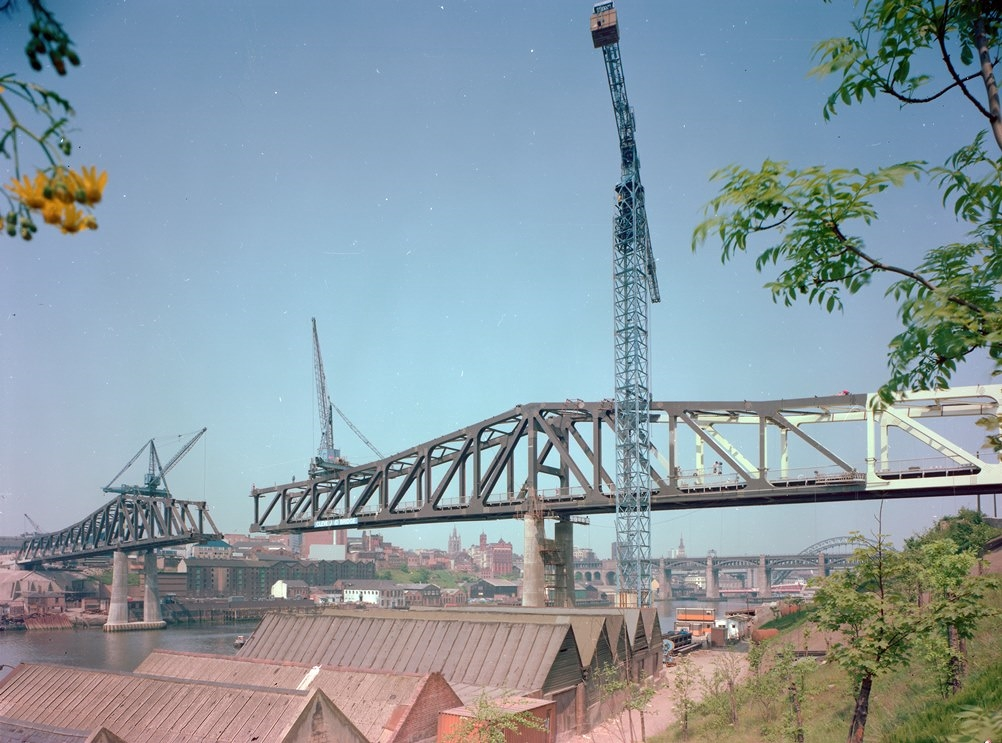
The Queen Elizabeth II Bridge over the River Tyne, nearing completion in 1978.

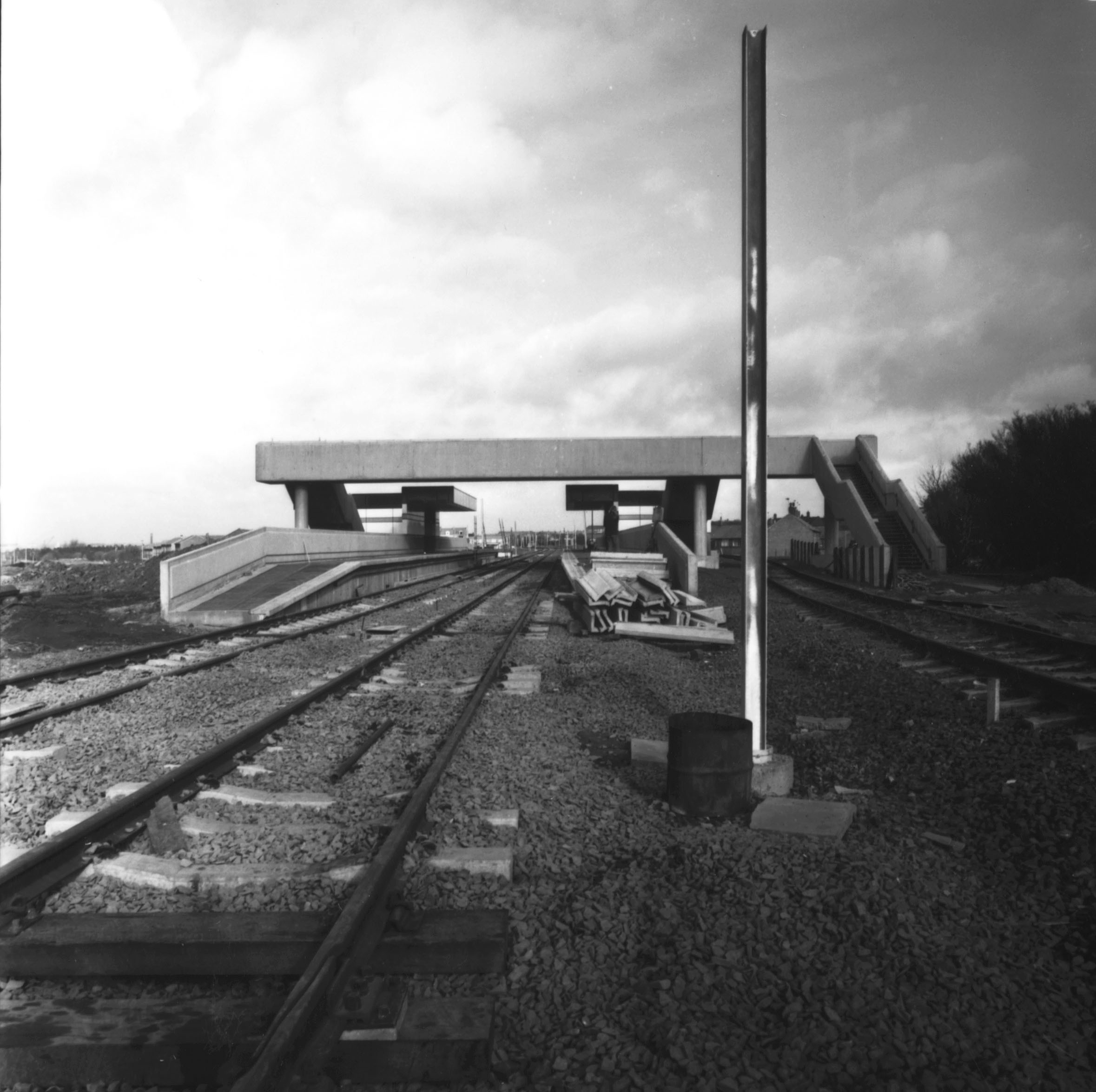
The Metro station at Tyne Dock, under construction in the early 1980s.

=== Opening ===
Originally, the Tyne and Wear Metro was intended to be opened in stages between 1979 and 1981. The first stages of the original network (between Haymarket and Tynemouth) opened in August 1980, with the final stage (between Heworth and South Shields) opening in March 1984. Extensions to Newcastle Airport and Sunderland opened in 1991 and 2002 respectively. The opening dates of services and stations are as follows:

Stations by opening date
Date	Station(s)
11 August 1980	Haymarket, Jesmond, West Jesmond, Ilford Road, South Gosforth, Longbenton, Four Lane Ends, Benton, Shiremoor, West Monkseaton, Monkseaton, Whitley Bay, Cullercoats, Tynemouth
10 May 1981	Regent Centre, Wansbeck Road, Fawdon, Bank Foot
15 November 1981	Heworth, Felling, Gateshead Stadium, Gateshead, Central Station, Monument (Note: Platforms 1 & 2 opened on 15 November 1981, with platforms 3 & 4 opening the following year.)
14 November 1982	North Shields, Meadow Well, (Note: Opened as Smith's Park, being renamed Meadow Well on 10 October 1994.) Percy Main, Howdon, Hadrian Road, Wallsend, Walkergate, Chillingham Road, Byker, Manors, St James
24 March 1984	Hebburn, Jarrow, Bede, Tyne Dock, Chichester, South Shields
15 September 1985	Kingston Park
16 September 1985	Pelaw
19 March 1986	Palmersville
17 November 1991	Callerton Parkway, Newcastle Airport
31 March 2002	Fellgate, Brockley Whins, East Boldon, Seaburn, Stadium of Light, St Peter's, Sunderland, University, Millfield, Pallion, South Hylton
28 April 2002	Park Lane
11 December 2005	Northumberland Park
17 March 2008	Simonside

=== Integration ===
When the Tyne and Wear Metro first opened, it was intended to form part of an integrated public transport system, with the local bus network reconfigured to act as 'feeder' services for the Metro. The Metro was intended to cover trunk journeys, while buses were re-designed towards shorter, local trips, to bring passengers to and from Metro stations, using unified ticketing, and with their timetable integrated with the Metro schedule. Several purpose-built transport interchanges, such as Four Lane Ends, Heworth and Regent Centre were built for this purpose. Integration was short-lived, and lasted until the deregulation of bus services, in 1986. It is, however, still possible to purchase Transfare tickets, to combine a journey made using multiple modes of transport in Tyne and Wear.

== Expansion and growth ==
=== Extension to Newcastle Airport ===
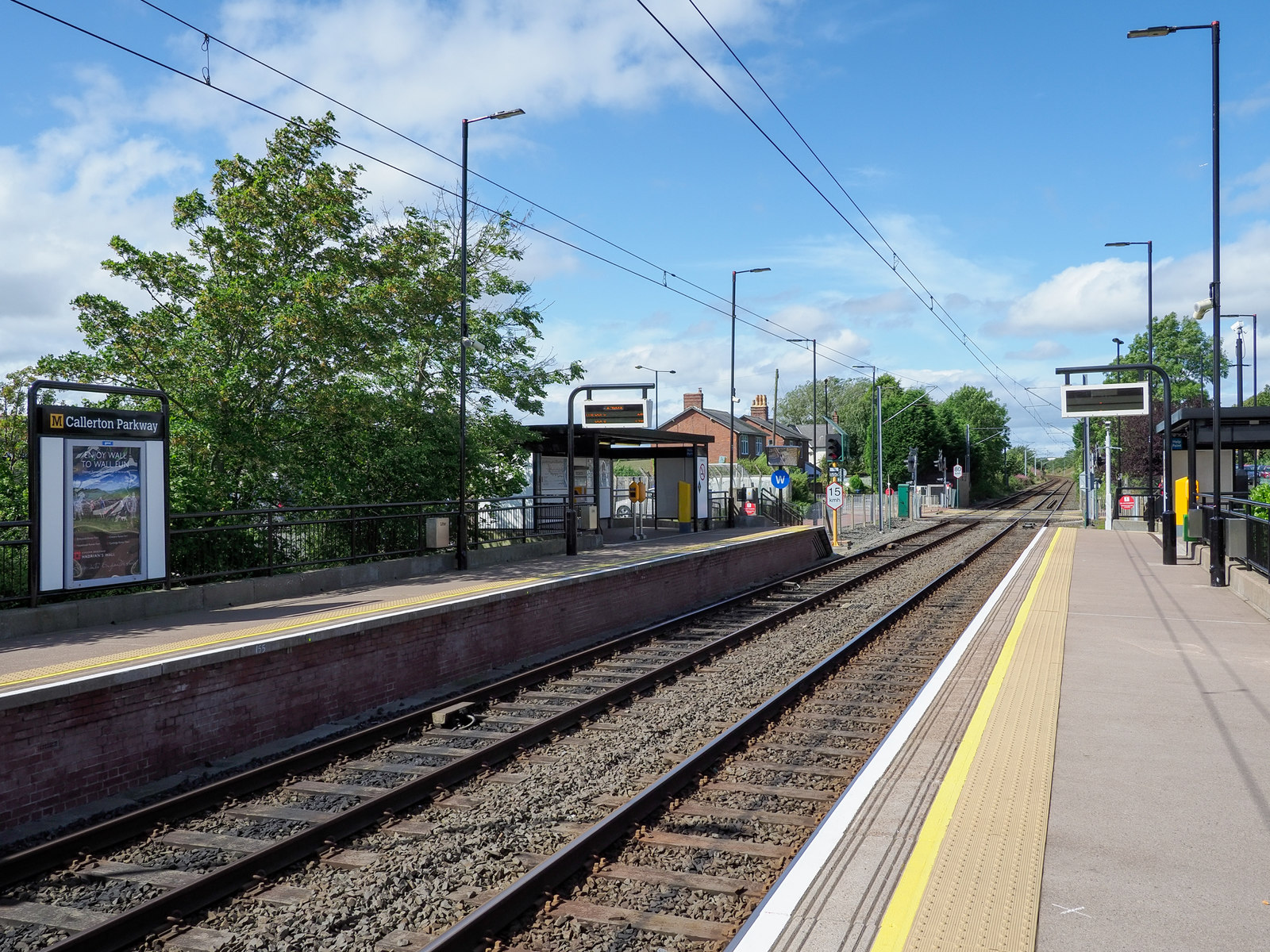
Callerton Parkway Metro station

During November 1991, the Tyne and Wear Metro was extended to Newcastle Airport at a cost of £12 million. The new section of track, covering a distance of around 3.5 km (2.2 mi), continued along the alignment of the former Ponteland Railway, with two stations constructed at Callerton Parkway and Newcastle Airport.

=== Extension to Wearside ===
In March 2002, a £100 million extension, covering 18.5 km (11.5 mi), was opened from Pelaw Junction to Sunderland and South Hylton. The extension used part of the existing Durham Coast Line, with the line being adapted to allow a shared service between Metro and heavy rail services – therefore becoming the first system in the United Kingdom to implement a form of the Karlsruhe model. Between Pelaw Junction and Sunderland, intermediate stations at Brockley Whins, East Boldon and Seaburn were re-built, with a further three being purpose-built for the network, at Fellgate, Stadium of Light and St Peter's. Between Sunderland and South Hylton, around 4.8 km (3 mi) of the former Penshaw-Sunderland line, which closed to passenger traffic in May 1964, was used as the alignment of the route. Five purpose-built stations at Park Lane, University, Millfield, Pallion and South Hylton were constructed for the network.

=== Planned extension to Washington ===
There have been a number of proposals looking in to the possibility of re-opening the former Leamside line to Washington, including a 2009 report from the Association of Train Operating Companies (ATOC), and a 2016 proposal from the North East Combined Authority (NECA), as well as the abandoned Project Orpheus programme, from the early 2000s. By 2020, proposals were being put forward to link the current network at Pelaw and South Hylton, with the International Advanced Manufacturing Park in Washington, using part of the alignment of the former Leamside line.

The first stages of a business case were published in November 2022. It will be evaluated by the North East Joint Transport Committee with the ambition to secure funding from the Government to cover the cost of the scheme, expected to be £745 million.

In July 2024, Kim McGuinness, Mayor of the North East, provided £8.6 million to fund development of the expansion business case. The proposal is to use the Leamside line to provide a loop by connecting from the current terminus at South Hylton to Pelaw, with stations at Washington South, Washington North and Follingsby.

In June 2025, Chancellor Rachel Reeves announced £15.6 billion of funding for public transport schemes outside London, of which the NECA will receive £1.85 billion. This proposes the addition of stations such as Follingsby, Washington North and Washington South. This extension, running along the Leamside line will connect South Hylton and Pelaw. The NECA confirmed that £900 million of this funding would be used to build the extension to Washington (once the planning process was complete), with the remaining funds sourced from private investment, and with a targeted opening date of 2033. Construction could begin in 2030, and would be the first extension of the Metro since the opening of the South Hylton line in 2002.

== Upgrades and development ==
=== Project Orpheus ===
During 2002, Nexus unveiled an ambitious 15-year plan for transport in Tyne and Wear, named Project Orpheus. The project, valued at £1.5 billion, aimed to extend the existing Metro network, including links to Cramlington, Doxford Park, Killingworth, Metrocentre, Seaham, Team Valley and Washington. In addition to this, plans would see the introduction of street-running trams, river buses across the Tyne, and cable cars, linking 29 key corridors. The project has since been abandoned, with plans reworked and developed into the Metro: All Change programme.

=== Metro: All Change ===
==== Phase 1 – new ticket machines, Simonside, and Haymarket modernisation ====
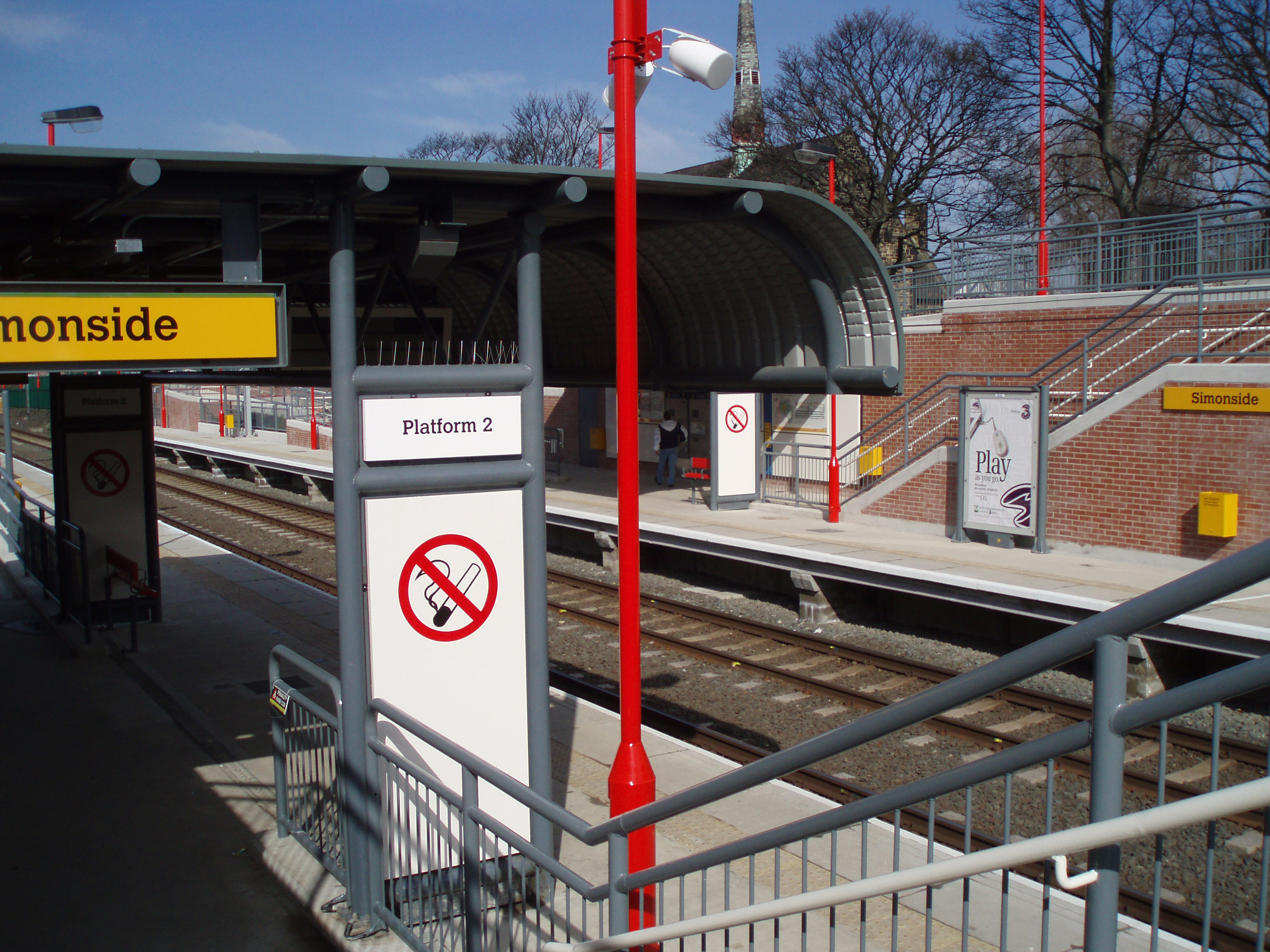
Simonside Metro station

The first phase of Metro's All Change programme saw the start of a £25 million project to install new ticket machines at all 60 stations across the network. Unlike the former ticket machines, which only accepted payment with coins, the new machines are able to accept payment with credit and debit card (with an upgrade to accept contactless payment in 2013), notes and coins. Automated ticket barriers (at 13 stations), and smart card validators at all stations across the network were also introduced, as part of the first phase of the All Change programme.

==== Phase 2 – Metrocar refurbishment, and rebuilding of North Shields ====
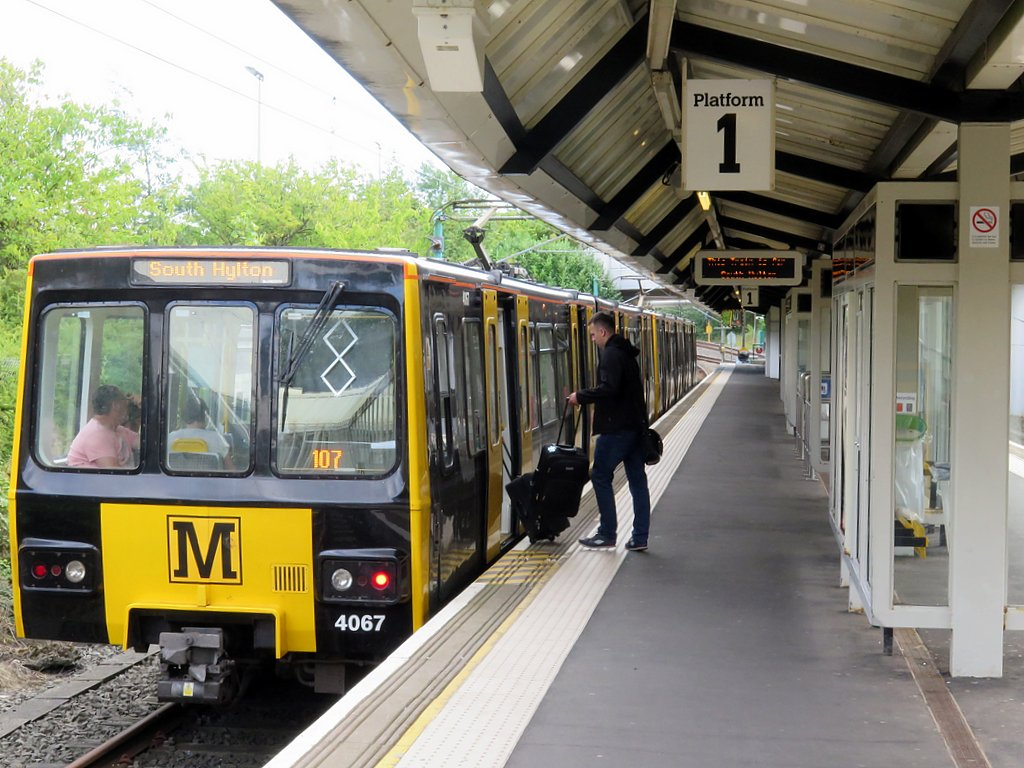
Post-refurbishment Tyne and Wear Metrocar

Phase 2 of the All Change programme saw the £20 million refurbishment of 86 Tyne and Wear Metrocars (originally all 90 Metrocars were due to be refurbished). Each Metrocar was stripped down to its frame and built back up again, with the addition of improved disabled access, new door control systems, and renewed interiors, seating and lighting. A new cadmium yellow and black livery was also adopted. Work commenced in June 2010, at Wabtec at Doncaster Works, and was completed five months ahead of schedule, in August 2015. The first Metrocar to receive refurbishment was 4041, the unit being named after former Gateshead Councillor and MP, Harry Cowans, in honour of his work in the 1970s, to help to secure the construction of the network.

The second phase of the programme also saw the modernisation of a further 45 stations, including the re-building of the station at North Shields, which was completed in September 2012, as well as the installation of new communications system, and the overhaul and maintenance of structures such as bridges, tunnels, track and overhead power lines.

==== Phase 3 – new fleet ====
The third phase of Metro's All Change programme began in 2019, with the procurement of a new fleet of 46 (originally 42) units, designed by Swiss manufacturer, Stadler. Delivery of the new rolling stock began in February 2023, with the first unit entering service on 18 December 2024. The rest of the fleet were slowly rolled out over 2025–2026, with one old train being removed for each new train added to the network. The last unit of the original fleet was withdrawn from routine service on 26 June 2026.

=== Maintenance and Renewals Skills Centre ===
In July 2018, Nexus announced the beginning of work to construct the new Maintenance and Renewals Skills Centre, at Mile End Road in South Shields. Construction began in August 2018 and was opened in November 2020. The £8.4 million project saw the construction of a three-storey training centre, with classrooms, a mock control room, driver training simulator, covered tracks and inspection pits, and a mock Metro station, as well as a 70 m (230 ft) stretch of dual track, to be used to carry out infrastructure training, including track, points, signalling and overhead line. The site is also used to stable and maintain a small number of vehicles.

=== Metro Flow ===
During March 2020, the government announced a £103 million scheme, known as Metro Flow, during the 2020 Budget. The project aims to increase frequency from five to six trains per hour, reduce journey times and improve service reliability. From September 2022, the project will see three sections of single line between Pelaw and Bede converted to dual use, with an existing freight-only line electrified, and re-designed to operate using a similar system to the shared line between Pelaw and Sunderland. As part of the project, four additional Stadler units have been funded, bringing the total number of units on order from 42 to 46. The increased daytime service frequency is planned to be introduced from December 2026.

== Network ==
The network of the Tyne and Wear Metro is a mixture of different transport modes, having elements of light rail, heavy underground metro, and longer-distance, suburban railway systems. While the owner Nexus terms it as light rapid transit, the national government classifies it as a light rail system. Technically, it can be termed a semi-metro network for having both underground sections as well as level crossings, while practically it can be termed a regional metro for having longer than usual distances compared to similar transport networks.

=== Services ===
The Tyne and Wear Metro network consists of two lines. As of May 2026, the typical off-peak service pattern is:

Green line
Route	tph	Calling at
South Hylton to Airport	4–5^{†}	Pallion; Millfield; University; Park Lane; Sunderland; St Peter's; Stadium of Light; Seaburn; East Boldon; Brockley Whins; Fellgate; Pelaw; Heworth; Felling; Gateshead Stadium; Gateshead; Central Station; Monument; Haymarket; Jesmond; West Jesmond; Ilford Road; South Gosforth; Regent Centre; Wansbeck Road; Fawdon; Kingston Park; Bank Foot; Callerton Parkway
Yellow line
Route	tph	Calling at
South Shields to St James via Whitley Bay	4–5^{†}	Chichester; Tyne Dock; Simonside; Bede; Jarrow; Hebburn; Pelaw; Heworth; Felling; Gateshead Stadium; Gateshead; Central Station; Monument; Haymarket; Jesmond; West Jesmond; Ilford Road; South Gosforth; Longbenton; Four Lane Ends; Benton; Palmersville; Northumberland Park; Shiremoor; West Monkseaton; Whitley Bay; Cullercoats; Tynemouth; North Shields; Meadow Well; Percy Main; Howdon; Hadrian Road; Wallsend; Walkergate; Chillingham Road; Byker; Manors; Monument
Core section
Route	tph	Calling at
Pelaw to South Gosforth	8–10^{‡}	Heworth; Felling; Gateshead Stadium; Gateshead; Central Station; Monument; Haymarket; Jesmond; West Jesmond; Ilford Road

^{†}Green and Yellow line train frequency
	Morning (06:00–10:00)		Day (10:00–18:00)		Evening (18:00–00:00)	
	tph	every	tph	every	tph	every
Monday-Friday	5	12 mins	5	12 mins	4	15 mins
Saturday	4	15 mins	5	12 mins	4	15 mins
Sunday	2	30 mins	4	15 mins	4	15 mins

^{‡}Core section train frequency
	Morning (06:00–10:00)		Day (10:00–18:00)		Evening (18:00–00:00)	
	tph	every	tph	every	tph	every
Monday-Friday	10	6 mins	10	6 mins	8	7–8 mins
Saturday	8	7–8 mins	10	6 mins	8	7–8 mins
Sunday	4	15 mins	8	7–8 mins	8	7–8 mins

Services commence between 05:00–06:00 weekdays and between 06:00–07:00 on Saturday and Sunday, with frequent trains running until around midnight. Each line runs up to every 12–15 minutes (4 to 5 trains per hour), allowing a combined time of 6–8 minutes (8 to 10 trains per hour) in the core section between Pelaw and South Gosforth.

Originally in the 1980s and 1990s, there was also a Red line between Heworth (later Pelaw) and Benton and a Blue line between St James and North Shields. All four lines ran at 10 minute frequencies all day Monday to Saturday, corresponding to a 3⅓ minute frequency (18 trains per hour, tph) between South Gosforth and Heworth/Pelaw and every 5 minutes (12 tph) between St James and North Shields. On Sundays, only Yellow and Green line trains ran, at 10 minute frequencies (6 tph) each. By 2000, Red and Blue line services had been withdrawn, with Yellow and Green lines running every 7½ minutes each (8 tph) during peak times Monday to Friday, with trains every 3¾ minutes (16 tph) on the shared section. This reduced to every 10 minutes per line (6 tph) off-peak and on Saturday, and every 15 minutes each (4 tph) on Sunday.

=== Route map ===
Geographically accurate map of the Tyne and Wear Metro

== Rolling stock ==
=== Original fleet ===
Since the Tyne and Wear Metro opened in 1980, it operated using the same rolling stock for 46 years. The original fleet comprised a total of 87 (formerly 90, until March 2017) articulated units, known as Metrocars, which were numbered 4001–4090. The Metrocars were represented on TOPS as the Class 599. When in service, Metrocars were normally coupled together in pairs and had a maximum speed of 80 km/h (50 mph). The first units to be built were two prototypes, numbered 4001 and 4002, which were delivered for testing in 1975. These were followed by 88 production units, which were built between 1978 and 1981. The design of the Metrocar was based on the Stadtbahnwagen B, a German light rail vehicle developed in the early 1970s. The units were built by Metro-Cammell, Washwood Heath.

The fleet was refurbished several times and several liveries were used. The original livery used at opening was cadmium yellow and white, in accordance with the colours used by the Tyne and Wear Passenger Transport Executive at the time. A mid-life refurbishment of the fleet, carried out in-house, took place between 1995 and 2000; a new livery was adopted consisting of red, green or blue bodies, with yellow front and rear ends, and triangles containing the Metro logo on the doors.

A £20 million refurbishment of 86 Metrocars (originally all 90 were due to be refurbished) began in June 2010, with the goal of the refurbishment programme being to extend the service life of the fleet until 2025 prior to the delivery of new rolling stock. Each Metrocar was stripped down to its frame and built back up again, with the addition of improved disabled access and new door control systems, with renewed interiors, seating and lighting. A new black, grey and yellow livery was also adopted. Refurbishment work was completed five months ahead of schedule in August 2015.

The final Metrocars ran in regular scheduled service on 26 June 2026, although units will still be used on the network occasionally.

Branding and livery
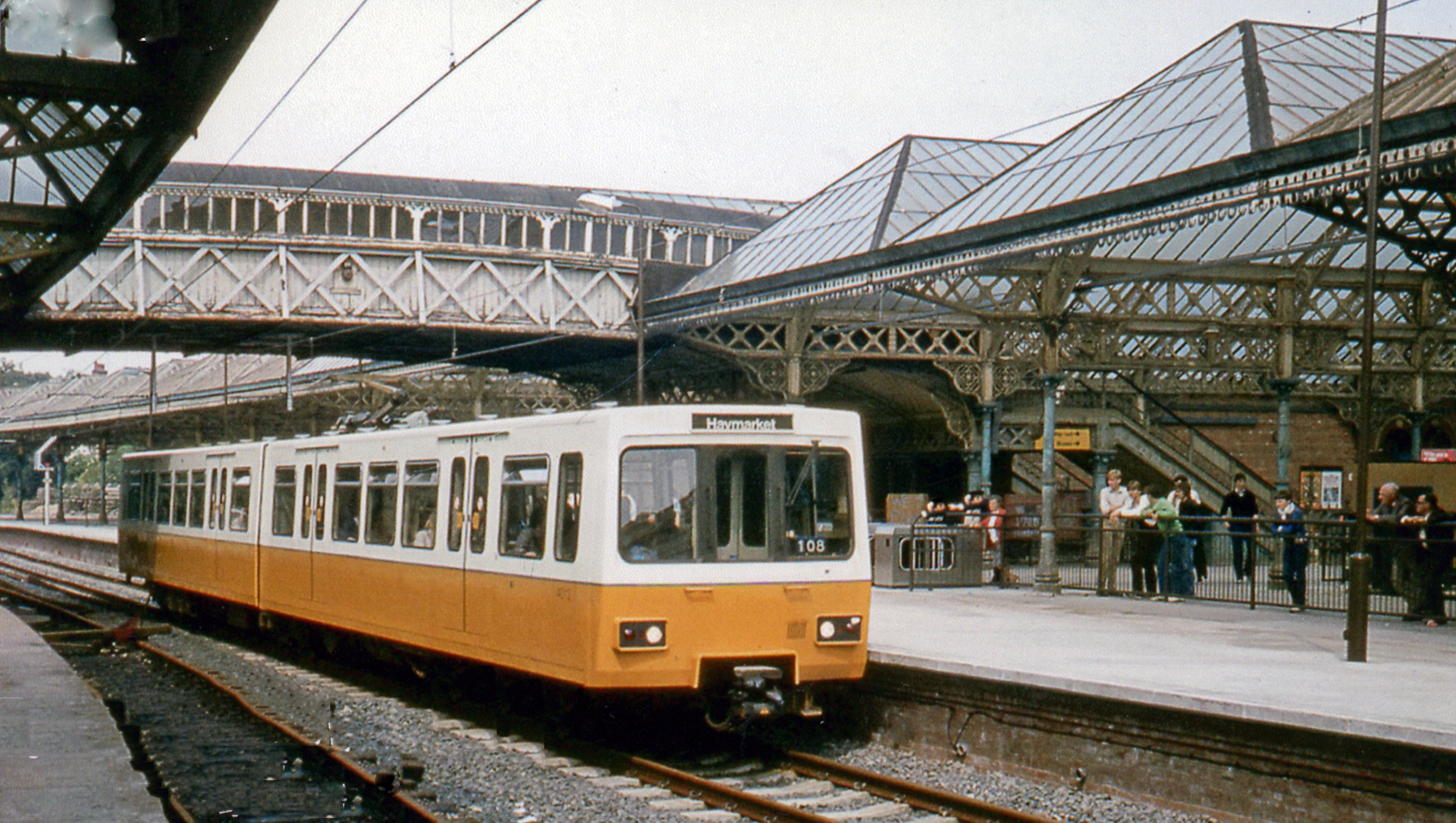
1980–1990s

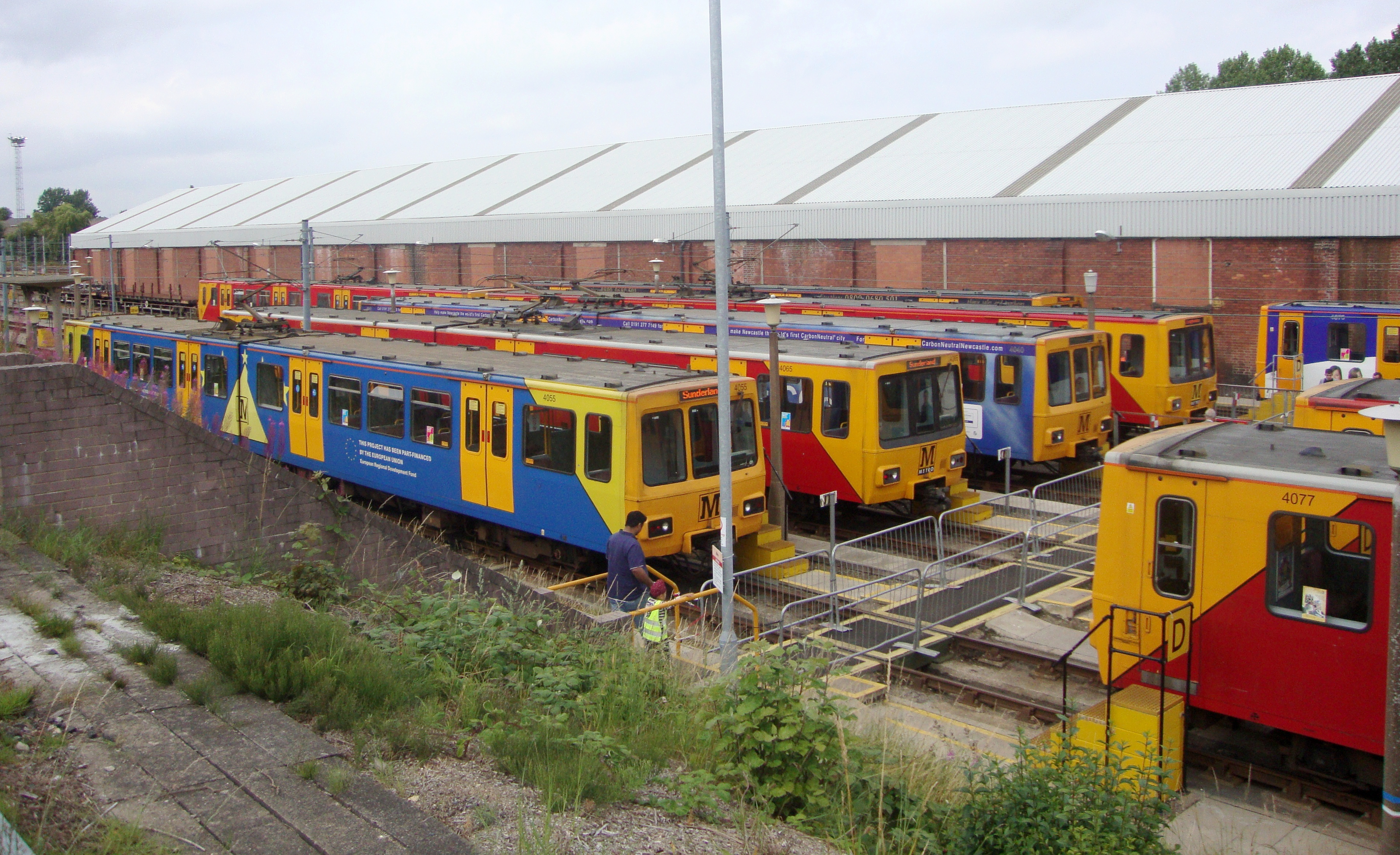
1990s–2010s

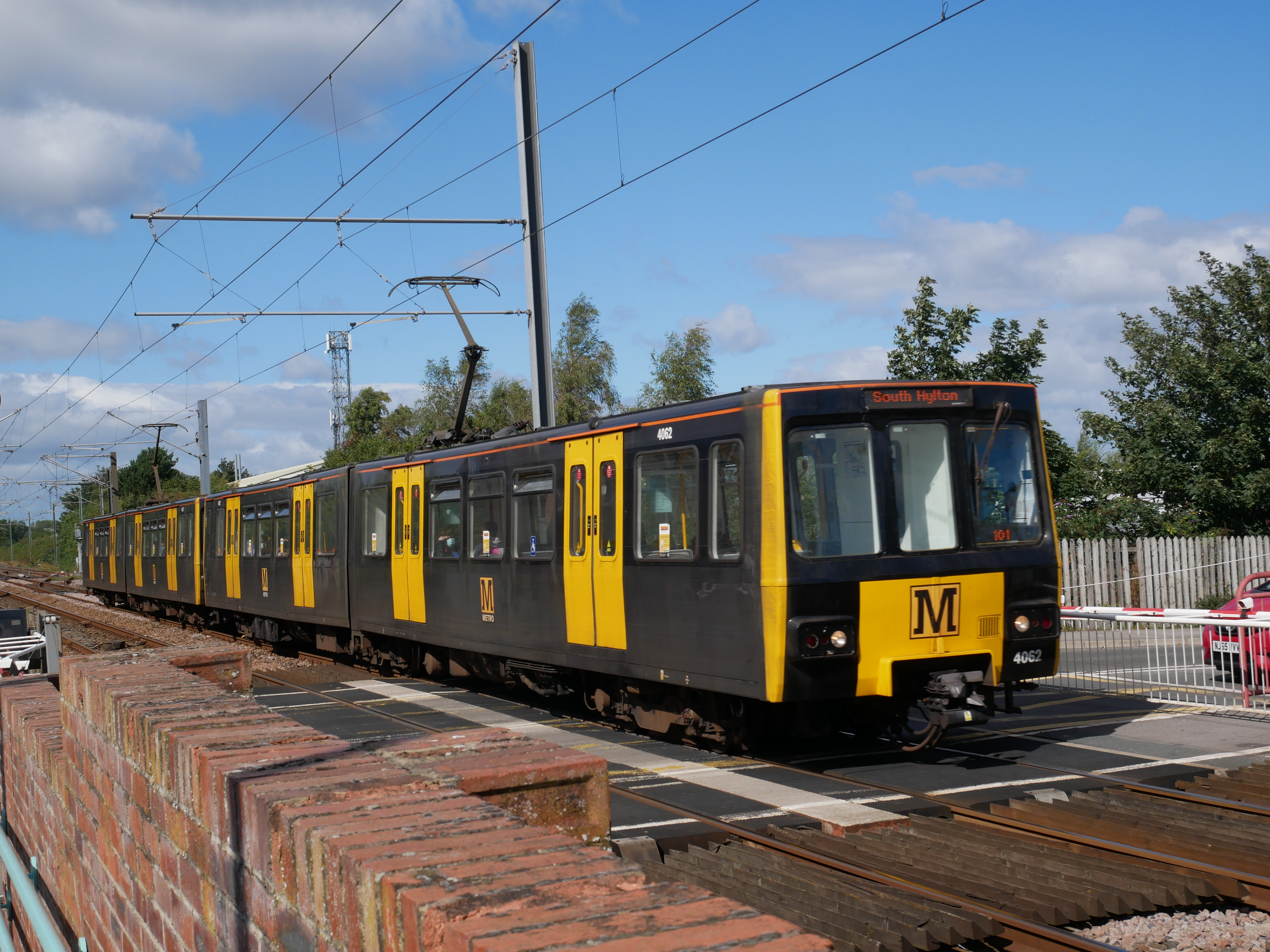
2010s–2026

=== Current fleet ===
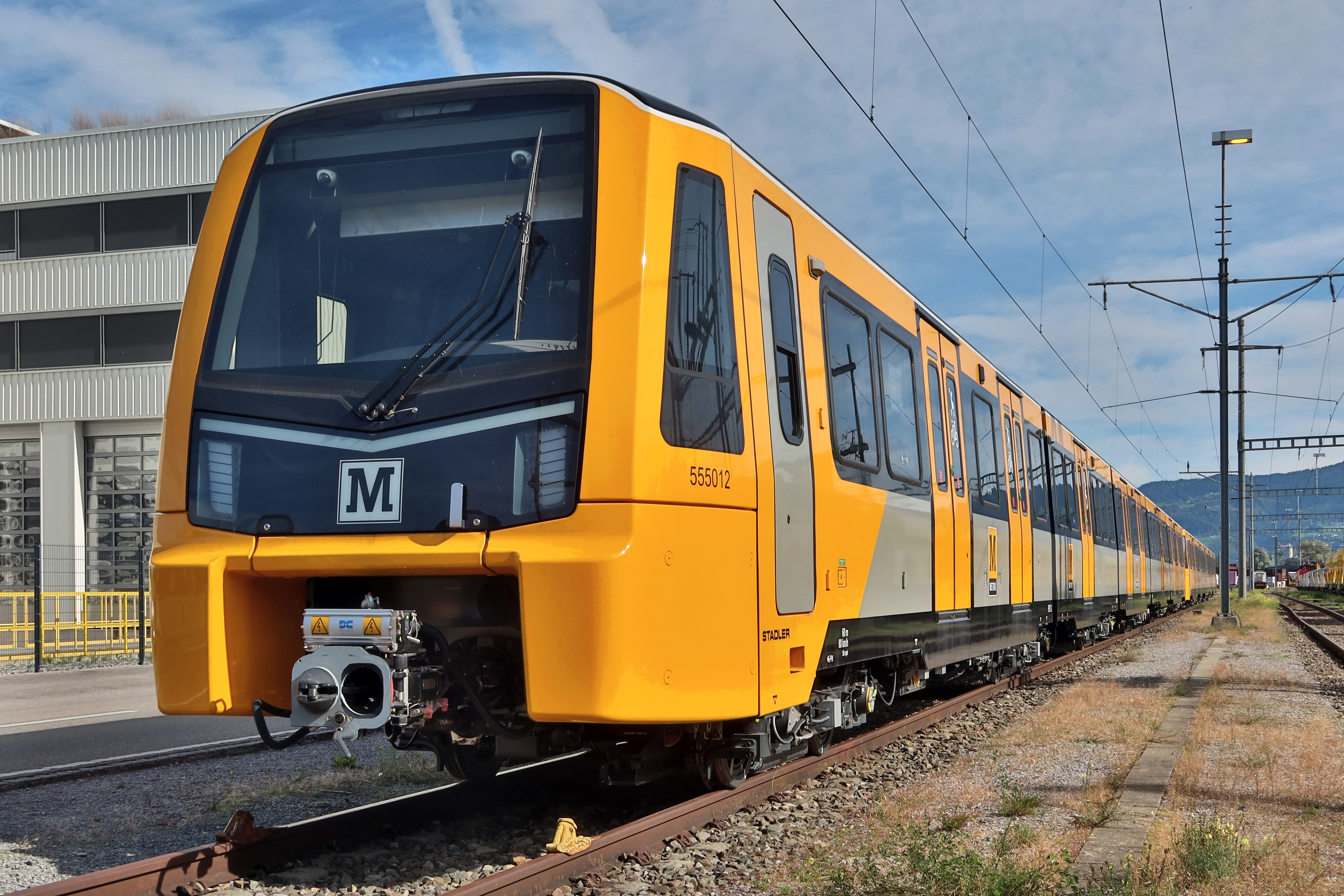
A new Class 555 unit on pre-delivery testing in Switzerland, October 2024

In 2016, Nexus unveiled plans to secure funding of £550 million for a new fleet, with a target for them to be in service by the early 2020s.

In November 2017, Chancellor of the Exchequer Philip Hammond announced that the government would contribute £337 million towards the new fleet. The proposed new fleet was planned to have dual-voltage capability, able to operate on the Metro's existing 1,500 V DC electrification system as well as the 25 kV 50 Hz AC used on the Network Rail network, to allow for expansion of Metro service. However Nexus decided not to include a dual-voltage design, prioritising use of rechargeable battery technology instead.

In September 2018, Bombardier, CAF, a Downer Rail/CRRC joint venture, Hitachi and Stadler Rail were short-listed to build the new fleet. Stadler was awarded a contract to build and maintain 42 five-carriage light rail vehicles in January 2020, with deliveries to commence in late 2021 and all trains to be in passenger service by 2024. The new trains feature next stop audio-visual information displays, Tube-style linear seating to increase capacity, wider doors and aisles, air conditioning, WiFi and charging points. Following the announcement of the £103 million Metro Flow project, in March 2020, four additional Stadler units have been funded, bringing the total number of units on order from 42 to 46.

During September 2020, the Metro Futures website was launched, allowing the public to give their view on several elements of the new Metro fleet.

In December 2021, Nexus revealed that the Metro fleet had entered the final assembly phase at Stadler's factory in Switzerland and that the manufacturer was in the process of fitting the main interior components of the first of the new trains. The works include the installation of wheels, seats, equipment cases, piping, wiring, flooring, windows and other internal furnishings. During September 2022, Nexus released a video taken at Stadler's test track in Erlen of a unit moving under its own power for the first time, prior to beginning full trials.

The first of the new fleet arrived at the Metro depot on 28 February 2023. By August 2024, three of these first nine units delivered had completed their daytime testing and the focus was moving to driver training.

The first unit entered public service on 18 December 2024., operating on the Yellow line between Monkseaton and Pelaw.

The last unit was delivered on 21 February 2026. On 2 June 2026, Nexus announced the original fleet would be taken fully out of service on 26 June 2026.

=== Ancillary vehicles ===
In addition to passenger trains, the Tyne and Wear Metro also operates a variety of ancillary and maintenance vehicles.

Five 0-6-0 diesel-electric locomotives (designated WL1–WL5) were manufactured by Brush Traction in 1977 and 1978 for the construction of the Metro network. They were also used for maintenance work on the operational system before being replaced by three battery-electric locomotives (designated BL1–BL3), manufactured by Hunslet in 1988. These Brush locomotives were then serviced by RFS then sold to TML for construction work on the Channel Tunnel at Cheriton, then in 1996 to Insulated Services for Round Oak Steel Terminal. At least one of these Brush locomotives has since entered preservation.

A diesel-powered Switch & Crossing ballast tamper (designated MA60) was manufactured by Plasser & Theurer in 2013, replacing an older tamper. The old tamper was sold to Newag in 2017, who refurbished it before selling it on to railway firms in South East Asia.

Metro also operates eight flat wagons, five ballast hopper wagons, and two spoil wagons.

== Ownership ==
The Tyne and Wear Metro is publicly owned, receiving funding from council tax payers and government. Nexus, which owns and manages the Metro, contracted out operations and train maintenance as part of a deal with the government, to secure modernisation investment and operating subsidy for the system between 2010 and 2021. Nexus continued to set fares, frequency of services and operating hours. Opponents would suggest that this arrangement was privatisation by the back door, though some services had already been contracted out, such as cleaning of stations and ticket inspections.

During November 2008, Nexus invited potential bidders to declare an interest in a contract to run the operations side of the business on its behalf. The successful bidder was to obtain a seven-year contract commencing on 1 April 2010, with up to an additional two years depending on performance. In February 2009, four bids were shortlisted: DB Regio, MTR Corporation, Serco/NedRailways, and an in-house bid from Nexus. By October 2009, the shortlist had been reduced to two; DB Regio and Nexus.

In December 2009, DB Regio was named as the preferred bidder, with the contract for operating the system signed in February 2010, and the handover of the service taking place in April 2010. One of DB Regio's first initiatives was the Metro Dig It programme, and involved the re-painting of stations and deep-cleaning of stations and trains. In February 2010, the government confirmed it would award Nexus up to £580 million to modernise and operate the Tyne and Wear Metro, with up to £350 million to be spent on the Metro: All Change programme, over the course of the following eleven years. A further £230 million would support running and maintenance costs, over the following nine years.

As a result, between 2010 and 2017, the Metro was operated under contract by DB Regio.

In March 2016, Nexus announced that they did not intend to renew the contract with DB Regio, following the contract ending in 2017, after stating that they were dissatisfied with the operator due to missed performance targets. During April 2017, Nexus took over direct operation of the system for a planned period of two years, with the intention to re-tender the contract. The RMT trade union, however, has argued that the direct operation should be made permanent, and operation of the system should remain in public ownership. As of May 2026, the Tyne and Wear Metro network is still under public ownership, with services operated by Nexus.

== Infrastructure ==
=== Control Centre ===
The Metro Control Centre is based at Gosforth, in a building alongside the station at South Gosforth. It is responsible for operating the network's signalling and electrical supply, as well as being used to communicate with train drivers and other staff using two-way radio equipment. The original equipment at the control centre was replaced in 2007, with a new computerised signalling control system installed in August 2018 at a cost of £12 million.

=== Depots ===
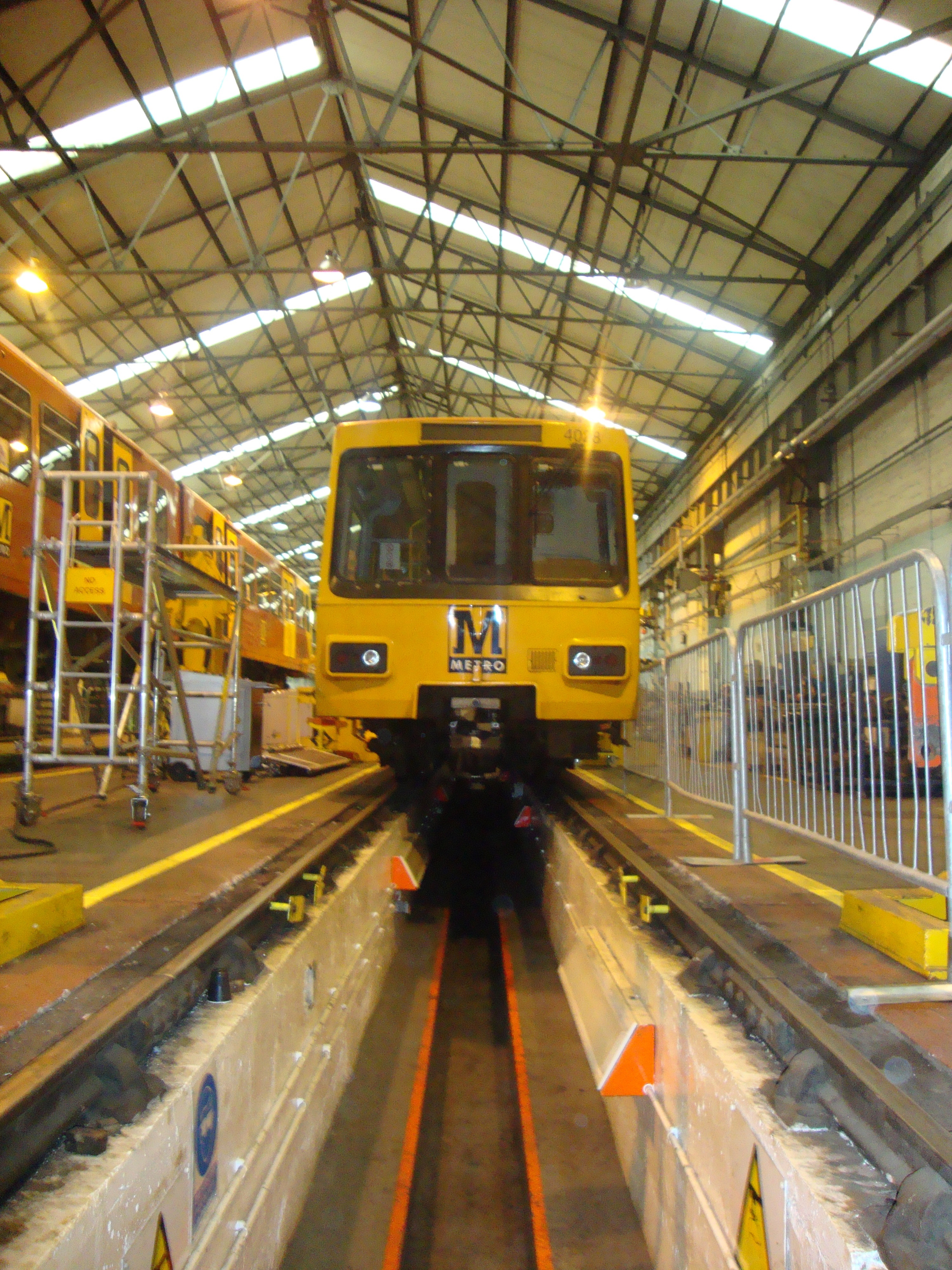
The interior of South Gosforth TMD in 2010

The Tyne and Wear Metro is currently operated from a single depot, also based in Gosforth. The depot was opened in 1923 by the London and North Eastern Railway and was used to house the former Tyneside Electrics stock. The depot was inherited by the Metro, prior to the system's opening in August 1980. The depot is located at the centre of the triangular fork between the branch to Newcastle Airport and the northern leg of the North Tyneside Loop. It is situated between stations at Longbenton, South Gosforth and Regent Centre; it is used for stabling, cleaning, maintenance and repair of the fleet. It can be accessed by trains from either east or west and there is also a depot-avoiding line running from east to west, which is not used in public service.

Prior to the arrival of new rolling stock towards the end of 2021, a new depot was constructed near Howdon, in North Tyneside. The site is used as a temporary stabling and maintenance facility for up to 10 Metrocars, whilst the current depot at South Gosforth is being reconfigured. The temporary depot at Howdon opened in August 2020. A further vehicle stabling and maintenance facility is also scheduled to open in South Tyneside, as part of the Maintenance and Renewals Skills Centre at South Shields.

=== Stations ===
The 60 stations on the Tyne and Wear Metro network vary widely in character. Some are former British Rail stations, whilst others were purpose-built for the Metro. Most of the stations are above ground, but several in central Newcastle City Centre and Gateshead are underground, namely Central Station, Jesmond, Haymarket, Monument, Manors, St James and Gateshead. In Sunderland, Park Lane and Sunderland stations also have underground platforms. The platforms at Four Lane Ends are also below the surface, as they are underneath by the station building. Five of the stations on the network, Central, Heworth, Manors, Northumberland Park, and Sunderland, allow for interchange with National Rail services. Sunderland is only one of two stations in the United Kingdom where light and heavy rail services use the same platforms; the other is Rotherham Central.

Most Metro stations are not routinely staffed. However, the busiest stations in central Newcastle and Sunderland (Haymarket, Monument, Central Station, Sunderland and Park Lane) are all staffed until late in the evening, and St James, St Peters and Stadium of Light are also staffed on match days. All stations are equipped with ticket machines, shelters and seating, next train information displays, and emergency help points. Ticket machines are able to accept payment with credit and debit cards (including contactless payment), notes and coins. Automated ticket barriers (at 13 stations), and smart card validators at all stations, were also installed during the first phase of Metro's All Change programme.

Despite the majority of stations being open to access, the Tyne and Wear Metro has the third-highest level of passenger revenue per year (£68.5 million in 2024/2025) of the eight light rail networks in England. Regular checks are made by teams of inspectors, both at stations and on board trains. Passengers caught travelling on the Metro without a ticket are subject to a £100 penalty fare.

In June 2022, it was announced that the installation of tactile paving at all Metro stations had been completed.

Stations
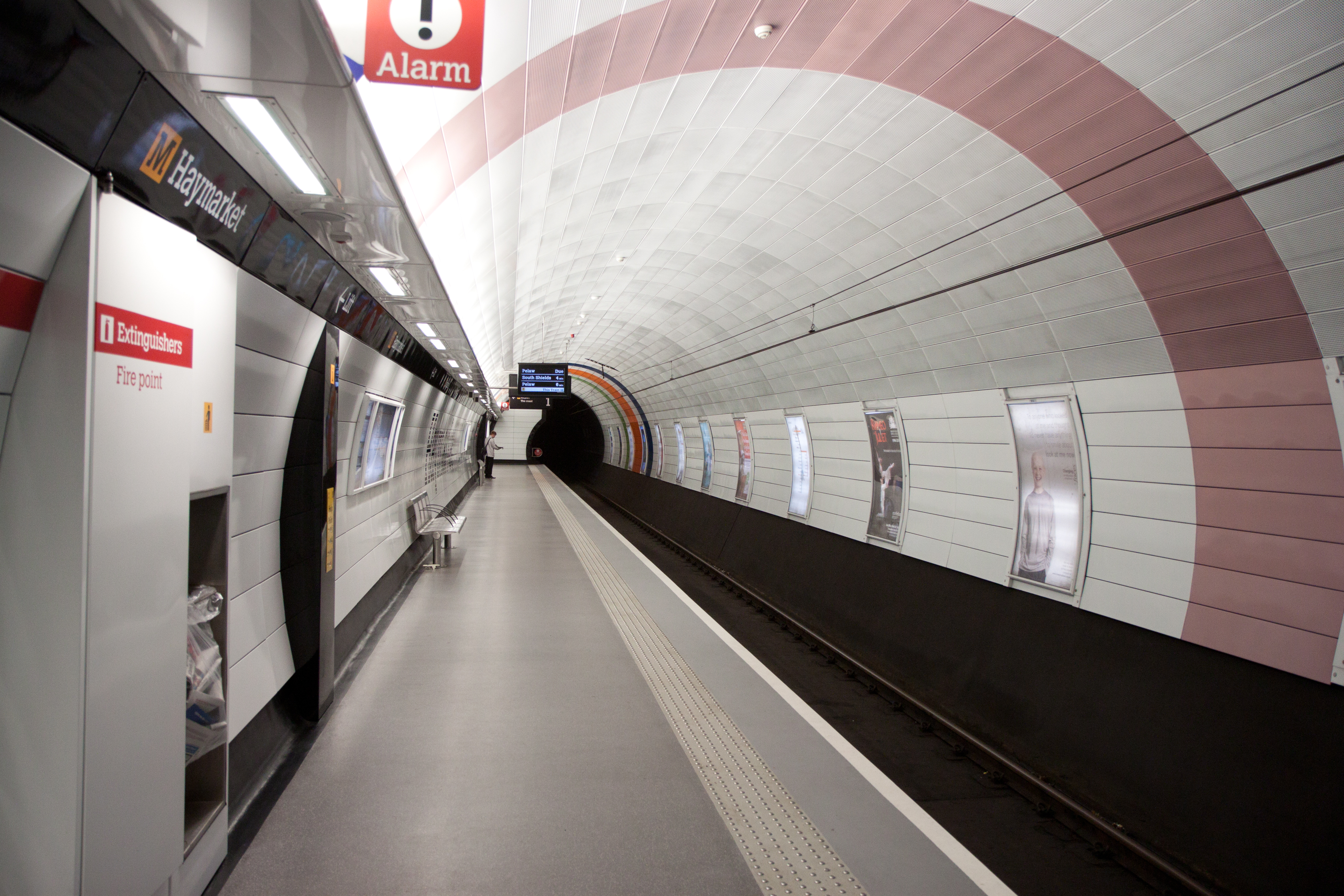
Haymarket, the first underground Metro station to be refurbished, branded in the new corporate colour scheme.

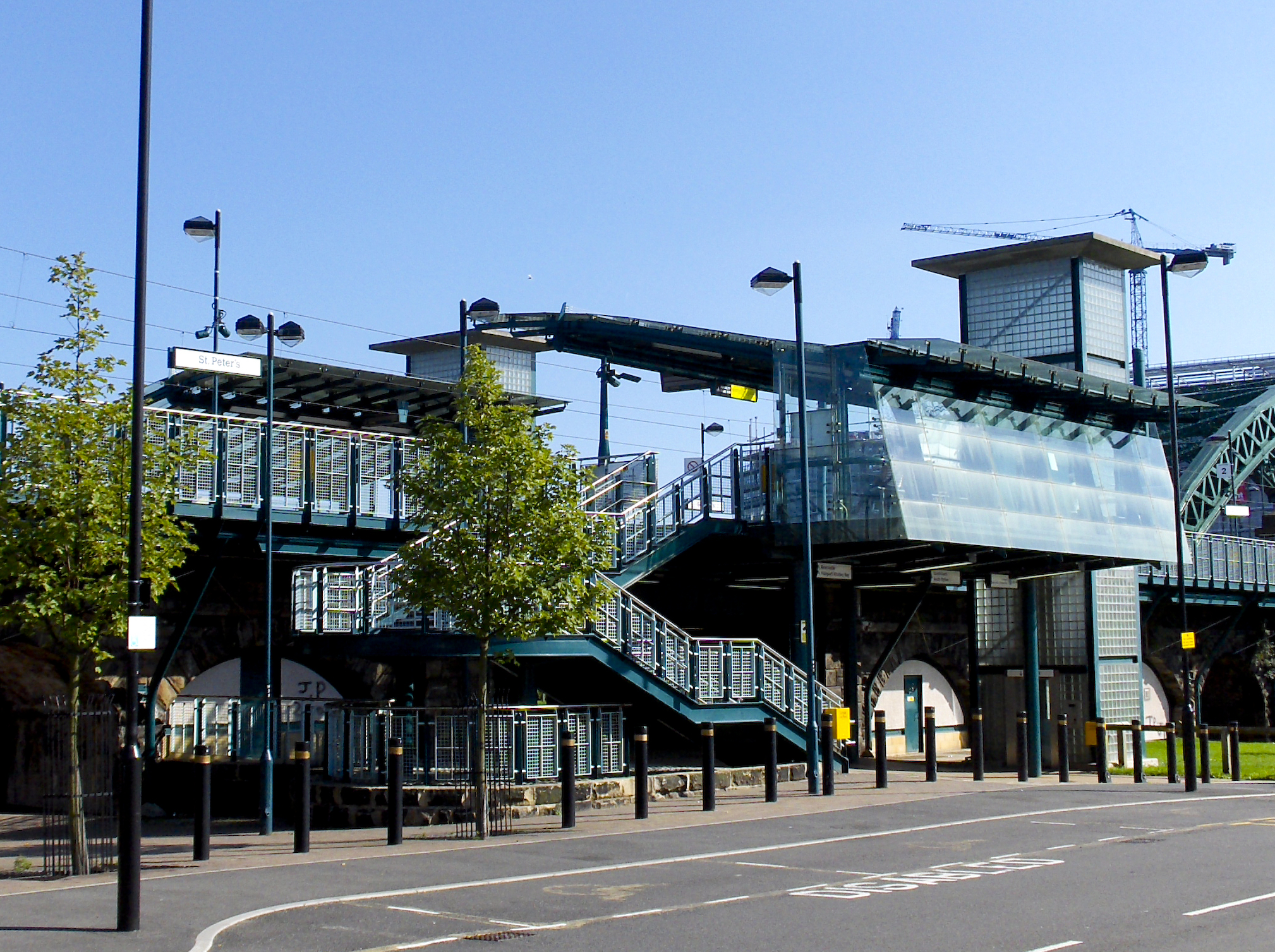
St. Peter's, a purpose-built station, constructed in the early 2000s, following the Metro's extension to Wearside.

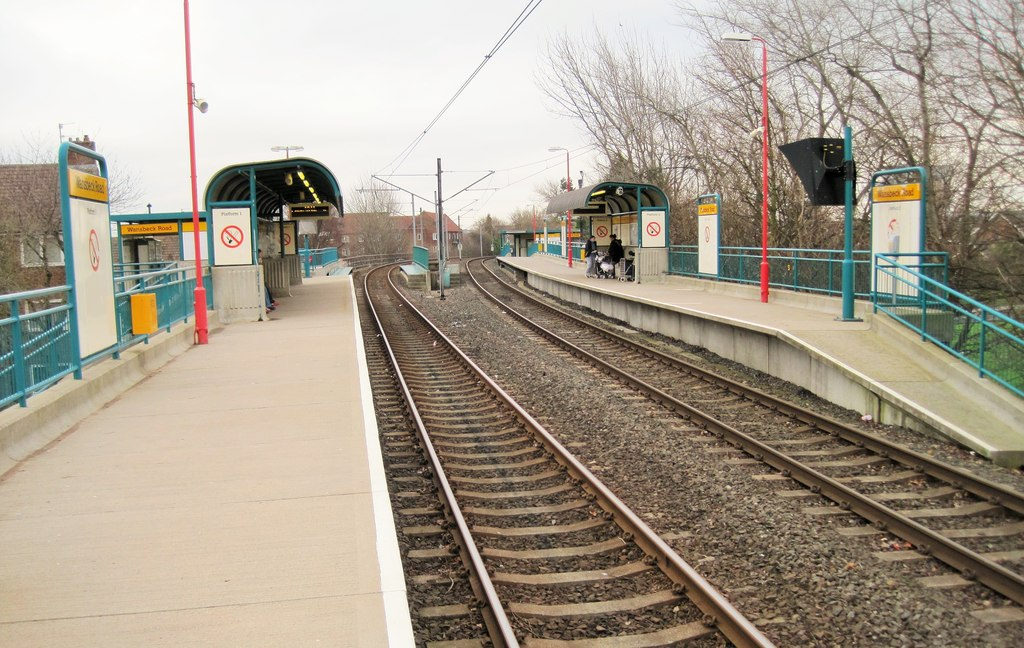
Wansbeck Road, a purpose-built station, which opened in May 1981, following the Metro's extension to Bank Foot.

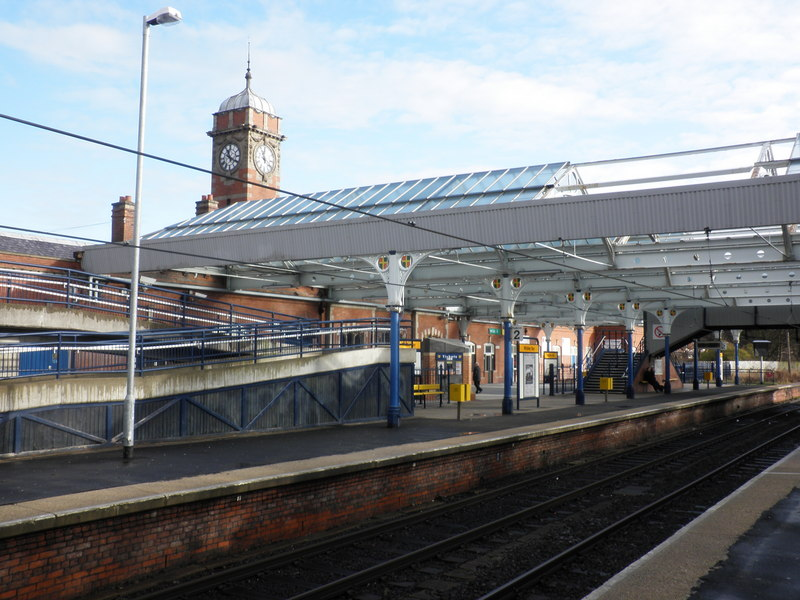
Whitley Bay, one of the network's former British Rail stations, located on the North Tyneside Loop.

=== Bicycles ===
Most stations on the network have cycle racks. Following a trial period in 2016, non-folding bicycles are permitted to travel on Metro between 10:00 and 15:00, after 19:00 on weekdays and all day at weekends, but only between Callerton Parkway and Jesmond, between Manors and Jesmond (via Whitley Bay), and between Gateshead Stadium and South Shields or South Hylton.

Folding bicycles are permitted to travel across the entire Metro network, given that they are kept folded and handles/pedals do not pose a danger to passengers.

=== Tunnels ===
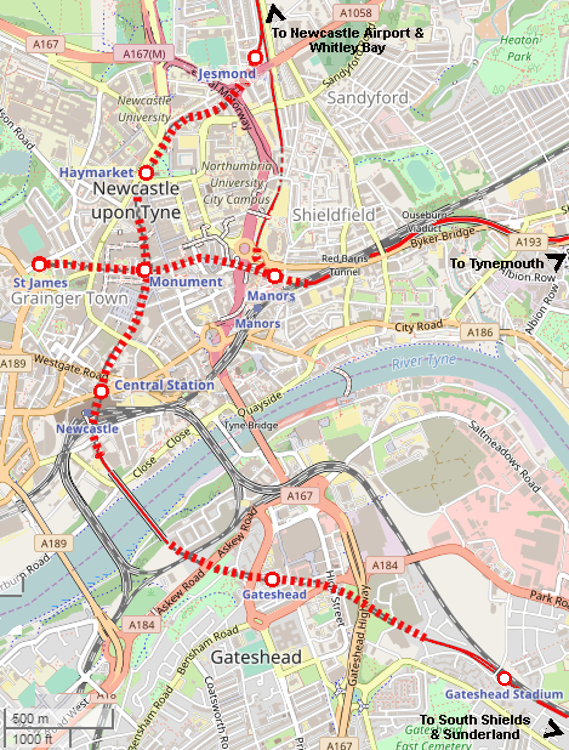
A map of the network in Newcastle and Gateshead. Metro routes are shown in red, with dotted red lines displaying tunnel sections.

Under Newcastle City Centre, two routes run underground at right angles to each other, and intersect at Monument, which has four platforms on two levels. The first route, shared by both the Green line and Yellow line, runs from north to south. It heads underground at Jesmond and runs south through Haymarket, Monument and Central Station, before rising above ground to cross the Queen Elizabeth II Bridge over the River Tyne. It then enters another tunnel, running underneath Gateshead, serving Gateshead Interchange, before rising above ground again just before reaching the station at Gateshead Stadium.

The second underground route, part of the Yellow line, runs from east to west heading underground after running east alongside the East Coast Main Line, before serving Manors, Monument, and terminating at St James. Yellow line trains pass through Monument twice, once eastbound through the east–west platforms, and then, after running around the North Tyneside Loop, southbound through the north–south platforms before running to South Shields.

The Tyne and Wear Metro is one of the few rapid transit systems in the world with a pretzel configuration, in which a line crosses over itself and trains pass through the same station twice at different platforms. This arrangement also exists at Voorweg on the Randstadrail network in The Hague.

The Manors stock curve, running partly in a tunnel, runs from Manors past the now abandoned Jesmond station on the North Tyneside Loop. The line is used for empty stock movements only, and has no passenger service.

The tunnels were constructed in the late 1970s, using mining techniques, and were constructed as single-track tubes with a diameter of 4.75 m (15 ft 7 in). The tunnels under Newcastle City Centre were mechanically bored through boulder clay, and lined with cast iron or concrete segments. The tunnels under Gateshead were bored through sandstone and excavated coal seams. Old coal mine workings, some of which dated from the Middle Ages, had to be filled in before the tunnelling began.

=== Level crossings ===
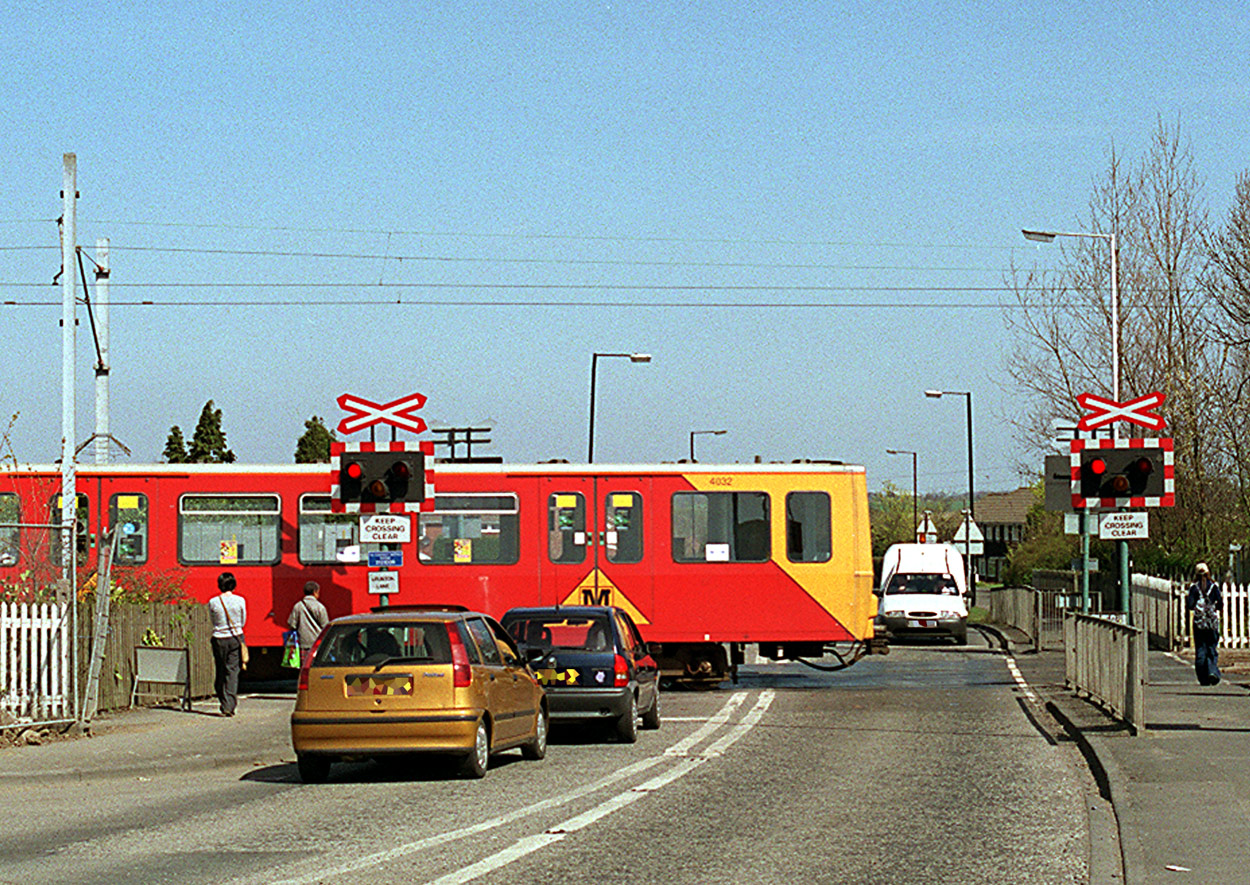
Level crossing near Kingston Park station

There are seven level crossings on the Metro network, five of which are operated by Nexus and do not have barriers as the frequency of Metro services would make them impractical. Three others are situated near East Boldon on Network Rail infrastructure, and have barriers due to the freight trains and National Rail services that use them.

=== Distances ===
Distances on the system are measured from a datum point at South Gosforth. The system is metric, with distances in kilometres, and rounded to the nearest metre. Lines are designated In and Out. The In line runs from St James to South Shields via the inside of the North Tyneside Loop (via Wallsend and Whitley Bay), with the Out line running in the opposite direction. By extension, the In line runs from Newcastle Airport to South Gosforth, and from Pelaw Junction to South Hylton.

Distance plates are mounted on all overhead line structures. Different distances are normally quoted for stations, depending on whether the direction of travel is In or Out. Distances increase from the datum in all directions. The part of line between Pelaw Junction and South Hylton – owned by Network Rail – is dual-marked in both metric units and in miles and chains. The closest adjacent stations by distance on the network are St Peter's and Sunderland, with the furthest apart being Pelaw and Fellgate.

=== Electrification ===
The Tyne and Wear Metro is electrified with overhead lines at 1,500 V DC, and is now the only rail network in the United Kingdom to use this system. Nexus has stated that its long-term ambition is to convert the electrification of the line between Pelaw Junction and Sunderland, which is shared with heavy rail, to the Network Rail standard of 25 kV 50 Hz AC. However, in doing this, a new fleet of dual-voltage trains would be required.

=== Signalling ===
Automatic train protection is provided by an Indusi system, braking trains if signals are passed at red, unlike the usual TPWS/AWS used on the wider British mainline system (TPWS/AWS as well as lineside Indusi equipment are fitted to the Sunderland extension). Train control is currently fully driver operated. A positive train identification system controls signals at stations, switches and crossings, while the rest of the network uses standard fixed block signalling with two- or three-aspect colour light signals. There is a minimum headway of three minutes.

== Passenger numbers ==
During the 1985/1986 financial year, the Metro carried a total of 59.1 million passengers – the highest figure it has ever achieved. By 1987/1988, this had declined to 44.9 million. The decline was attributed to the loss of integration with bus services, following deregulation in 1986, as well as the general decline in public transport use in the area. Usage continued to decline during the 1990s, reaching a low of 32.5 million during 2000/2001. From the turn of the century, passenger usage rose and stabilised, fluctuating in a range of 35–40 million passengers annually. Passenger numbers fell significantly during the COVID-19 pandemic to an all-time low of 9.4 million in 2020/2021. The Metro is the third-most used light rail network in the United Kingdom, after the Docklands Light Railway, closely following the Manchester Metrolink.

Estimated passenger journeys made on Tyne and Wear Metro per financial year (millions)
Year	Passenger journeys	Year	Passenger journeys	Year	Passenger journeys	Year	Passenger journeys	Year	Passenger journeys	Year	Passenger journeys
1983/84	49.8	1991/92	40.6	1999/00	32.7	2007/08	39.8	2015/16	40.3	2023/24	30.7
1984/85	57.2	1992/93	38.9	2000/01	32.5	2008/09	40.6	2016/17	37.7	2024/25	32.2
1985/86	59.1	1993/94	38.3	2001/02	33.4	2009/10	40.8	2017/18	36.4	2025/26	31.4
1986/87	46.4	1994/95	37.0	2002/03	36.6	2010/11	39.9	2018/19	36.4	2026/27	
1987/88	44.9	1995/96	35.9	2003/04	37.9	2011/12	37.9	2019/20	33.1	2027/28	
1988/89	45.4	1996/97	35.4	2004/05	36.8	2012/13	37.0	2020/21	9.4	2027/28	
1989/90	45.5	1997/98	35.0	2005/06	35.8	2013/14	35.7	2021/22	24.3	2028/29	
1990/91	43.6	1998/99	33.8	2006/07	37.9	2014/15	38.1	2022/23	29.3	2029/30	
Estimates from the Department for Transport

== Branding and identity ==
The Tyne and Wear Metro has a distinctive design and corporate identity, initially developed to distinguish itself from the antiquated rail system it replaced in the 1980s, as well as to match the livery of the buses operated by the Tyne and Wear Passenger Transport Executive, prior to bus deregulation in 1986. The Calvert typeface was designed by Margaret Calvert and first used on the Metro; it is used extensively throughout the system, including on the distinctive black M logo on a yellow background. The logo is used to denote the Metro, and is featured on cube signs at station entrances, as well as on board trains, and on station signage.

After the branding identity of the Metro became inconsistent and confused in the late 1990s and early 2000s, Nexus employed a local design agency, Gardiner Richardson, to help the organisation to revive the brand. During 2009, as part of the Metro: All Change programme, re-branding began to take place. Re-branding saw an emphasis placed on the Calvert typeface on lettering, signage and maps. It also saw the introduction of a simplified colour scheme of black, white, grey and yellow, to be used on refurbished stations, signage and trains. In 2009, Haymarket was the first station to be refurbished, using the new corporate branding and colour scheme.

Branding and signage
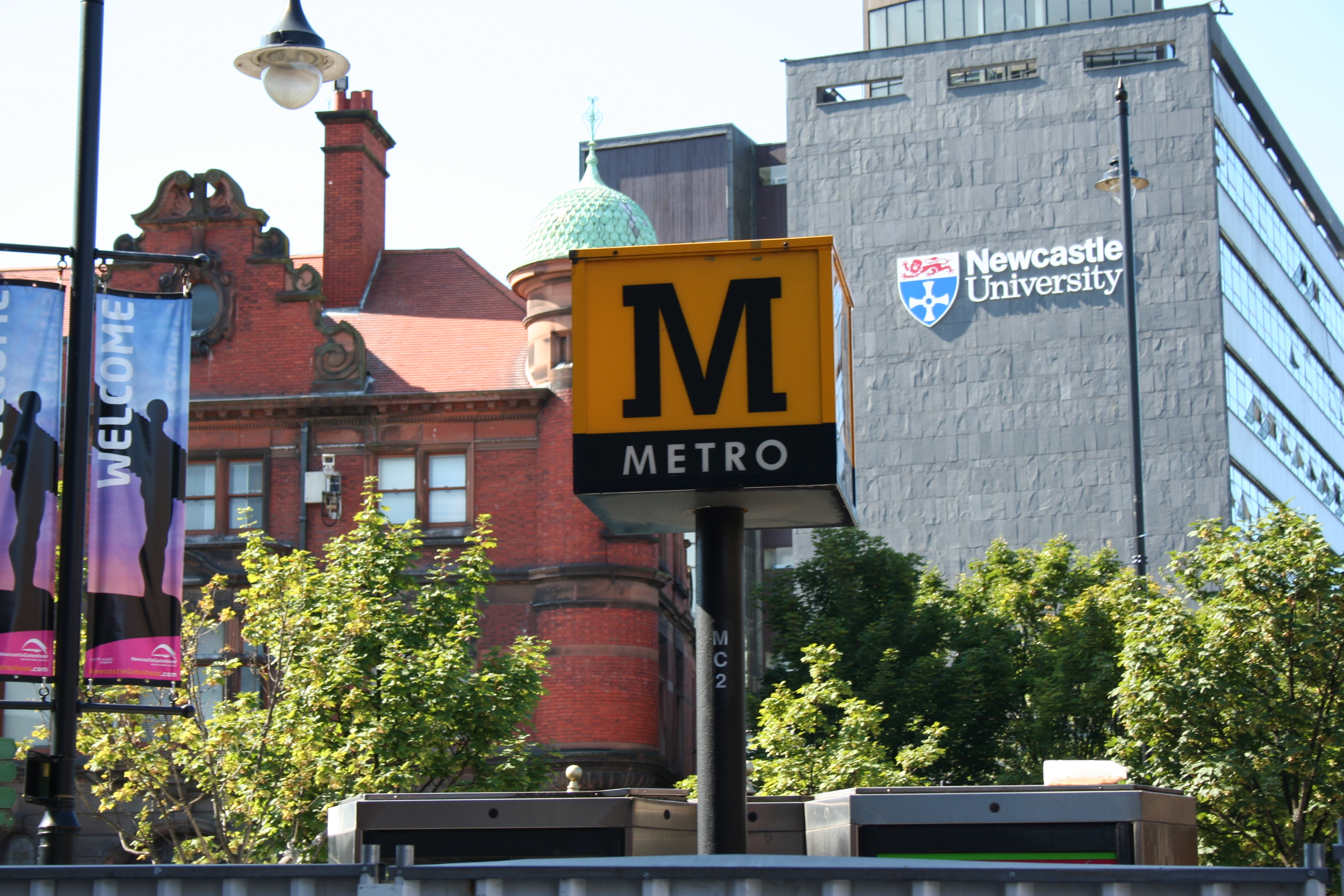
The Metro cube sign – a common sight at stations across the Metro network.

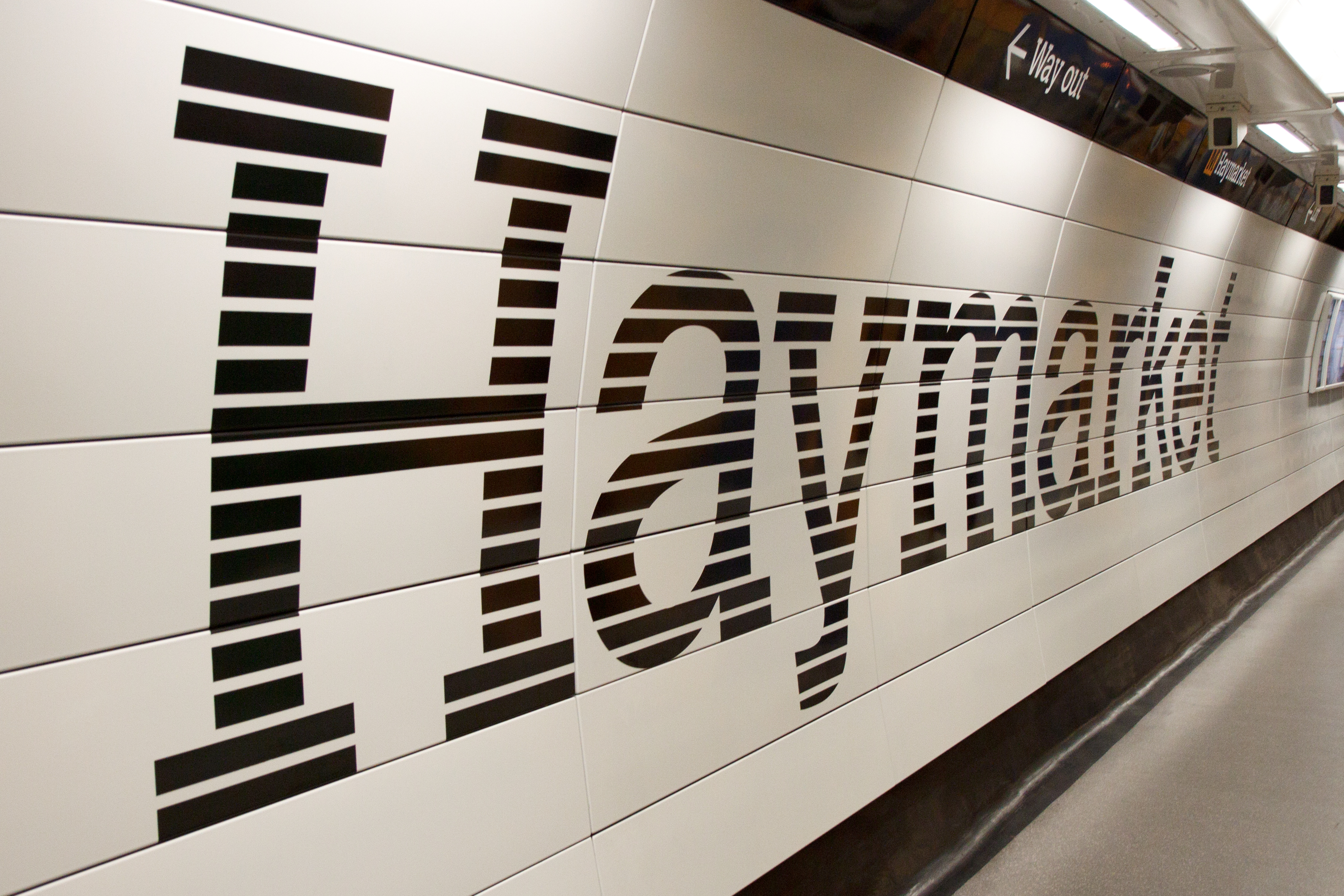
A platform at Haymarket, branded in the new corporate colour scheme.

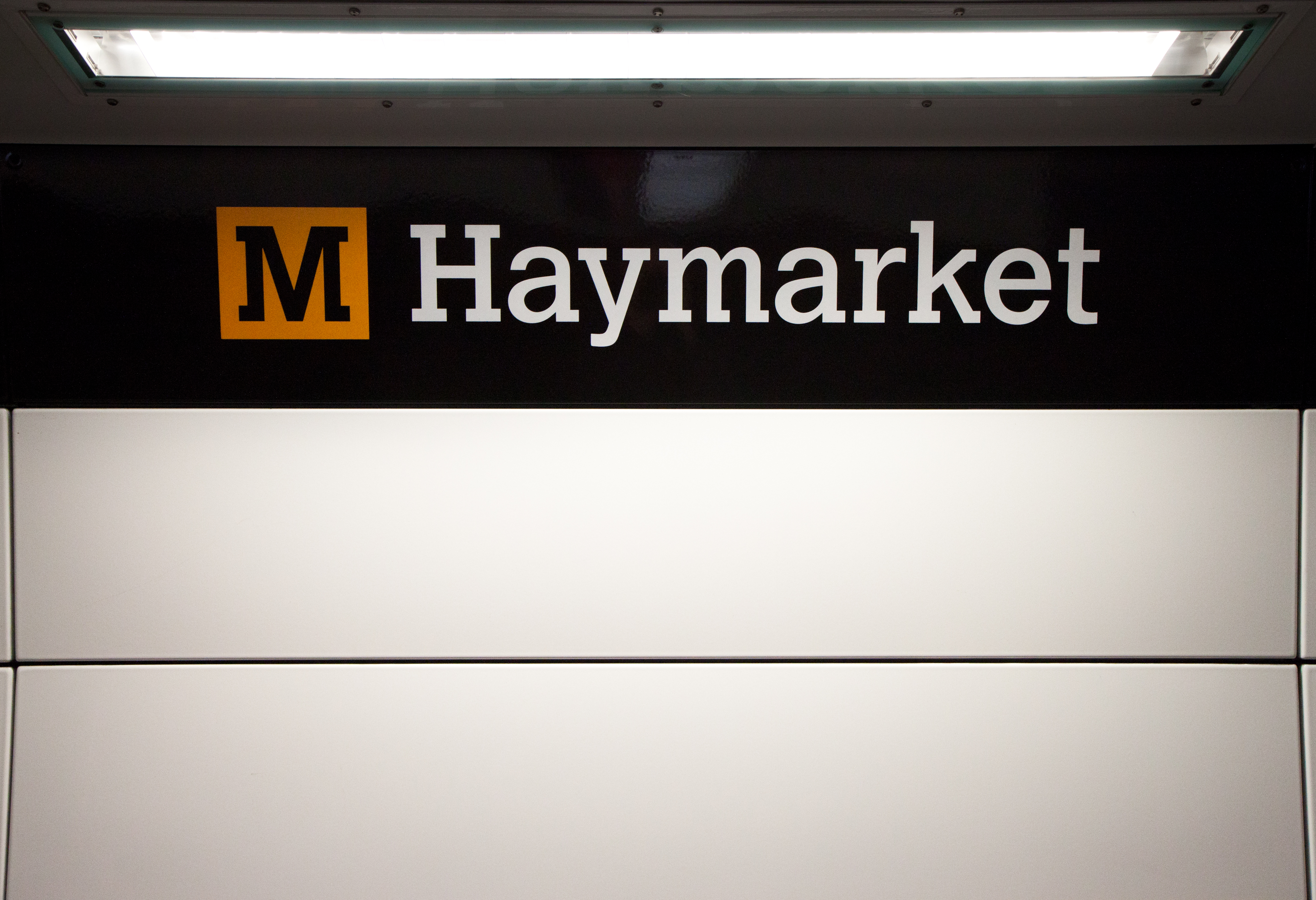
Station signage at Haymarket, branded in the new corporate colour scheme.

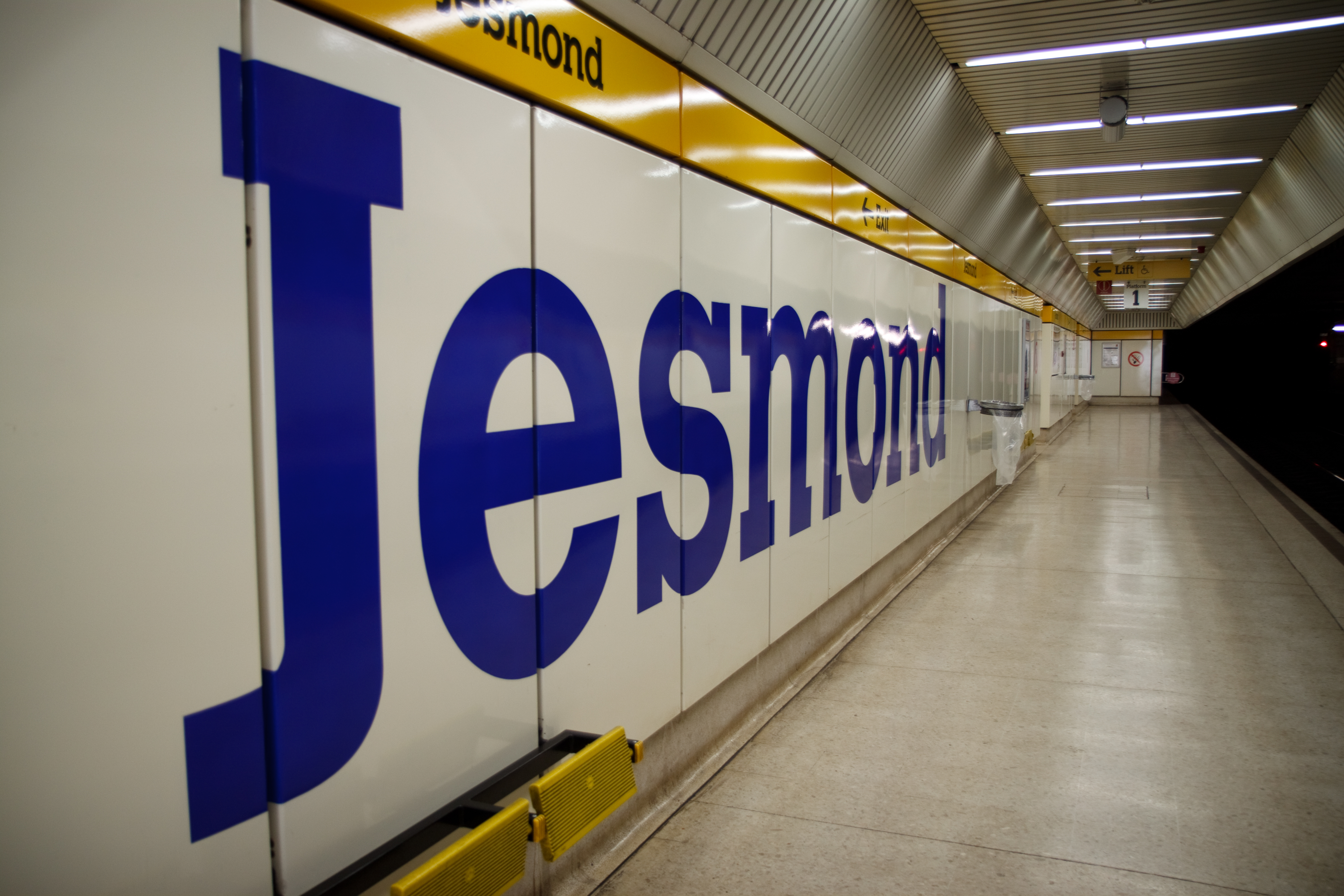
A platform at Jesmond, branded in the original corporate colour scheme.

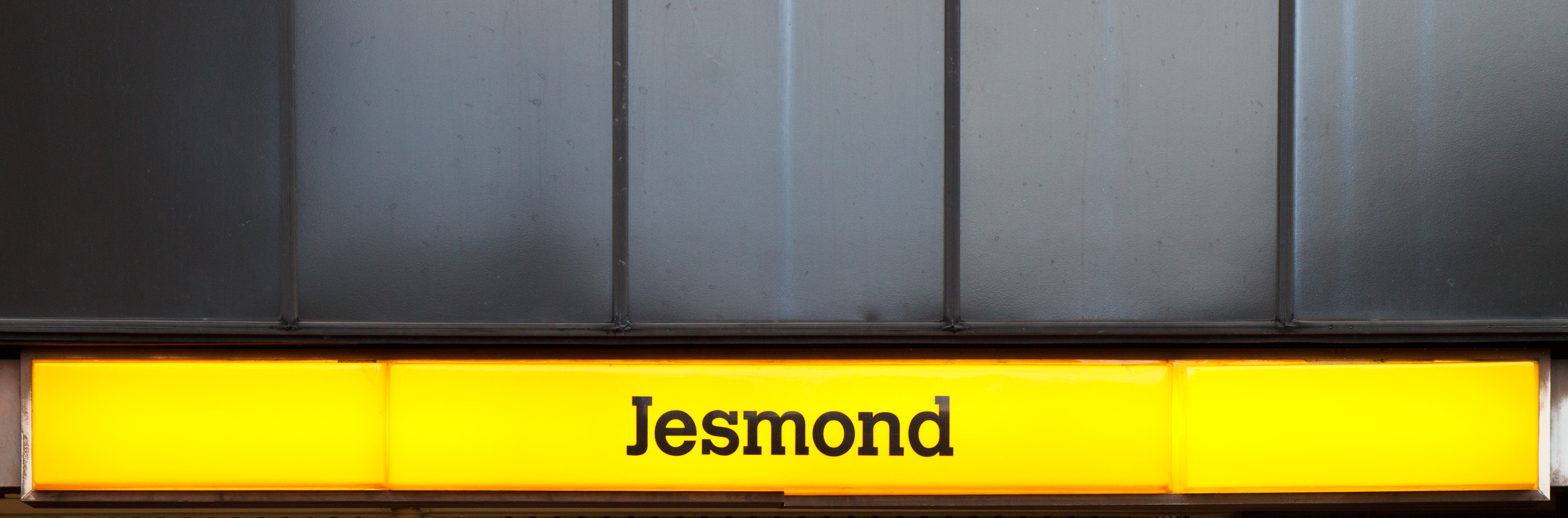
Station signage at Jesmond, branded in the original corporate colour scheme.

== Artworks ==
There are more than 30 pieces of permanent art across the transport network in Tyne and Wear. A number of Metro stations feature commissioned works by various artists, including:

- Haymarket: Canon (2010) by Lothar Goetz
- Jarrow: Jarrow March (1984) by Vince Rea
- Monkseaton: Beach and Shipyards (1983) by Mike Davies
- Monument: Parsons Polygon (1985) by David Hamilton
- Queen Elizabeth II Bridge: Nocturne (2007) by Nayan Kulkarni
- Sunderland: Platform 5 (2011) by Jason Bruges Studio
- Wallsend: Pontis (2003) by Michael Pinsky
Art
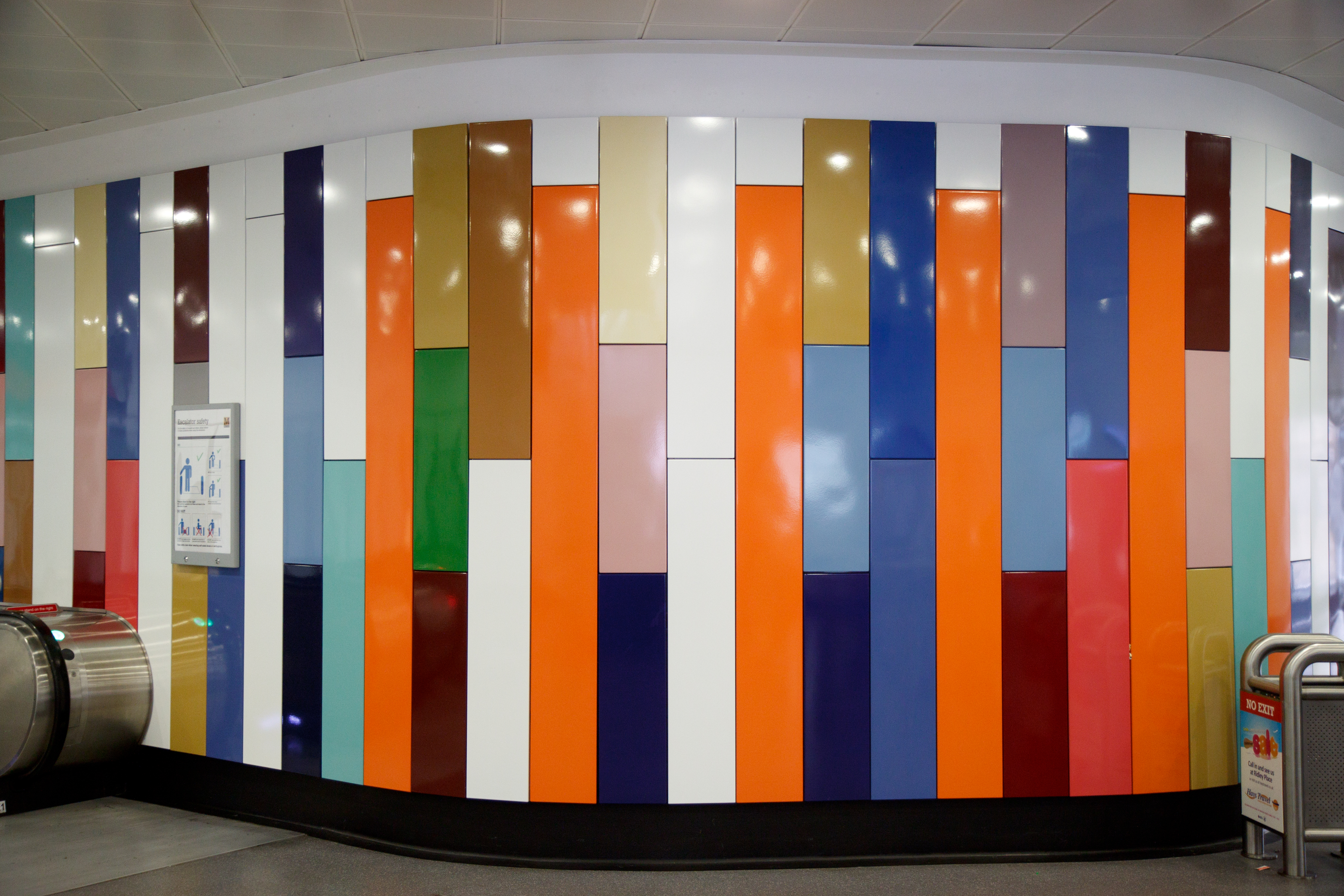
Canon (2010)

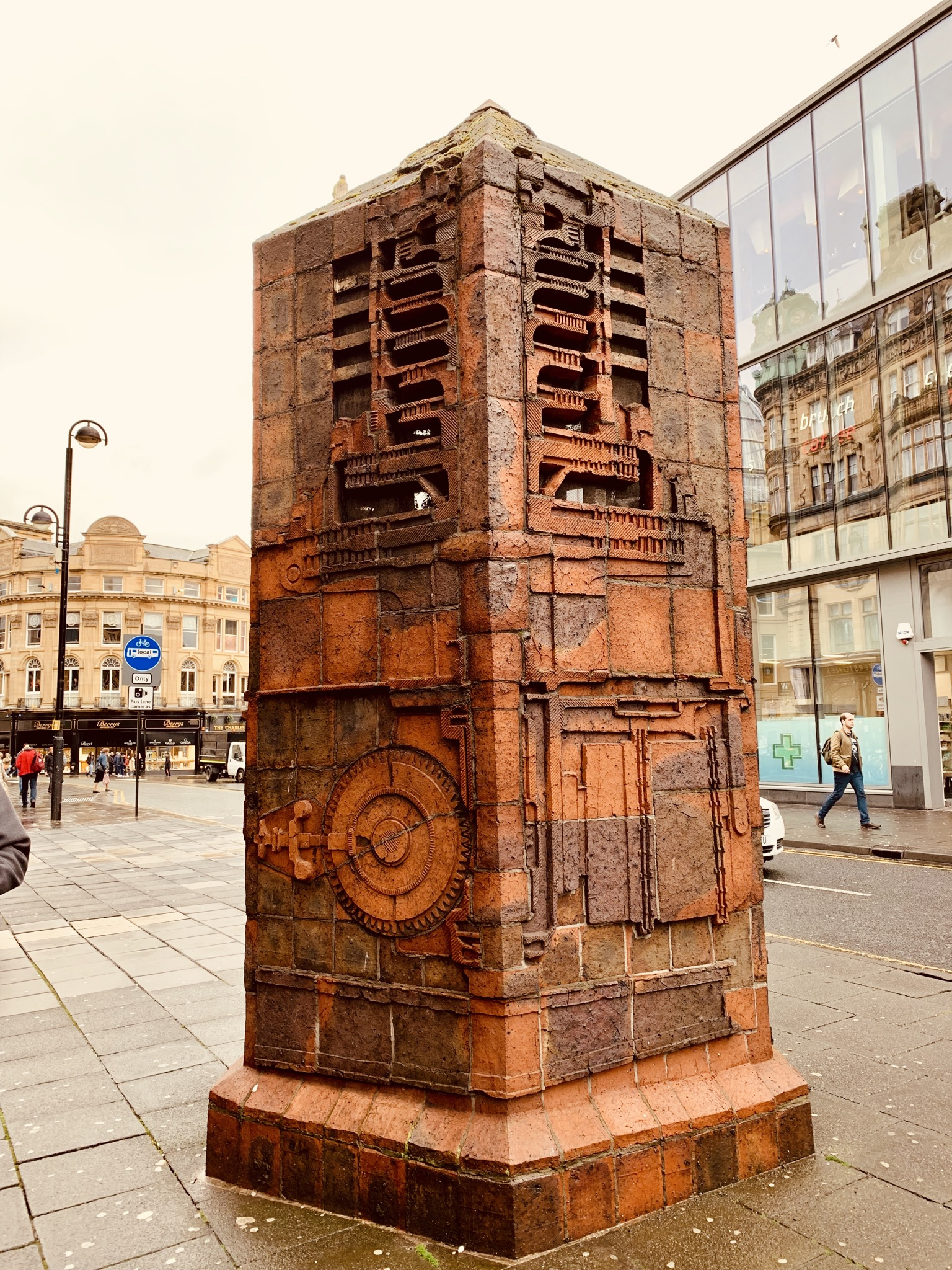
Parsons Polygon (1985)

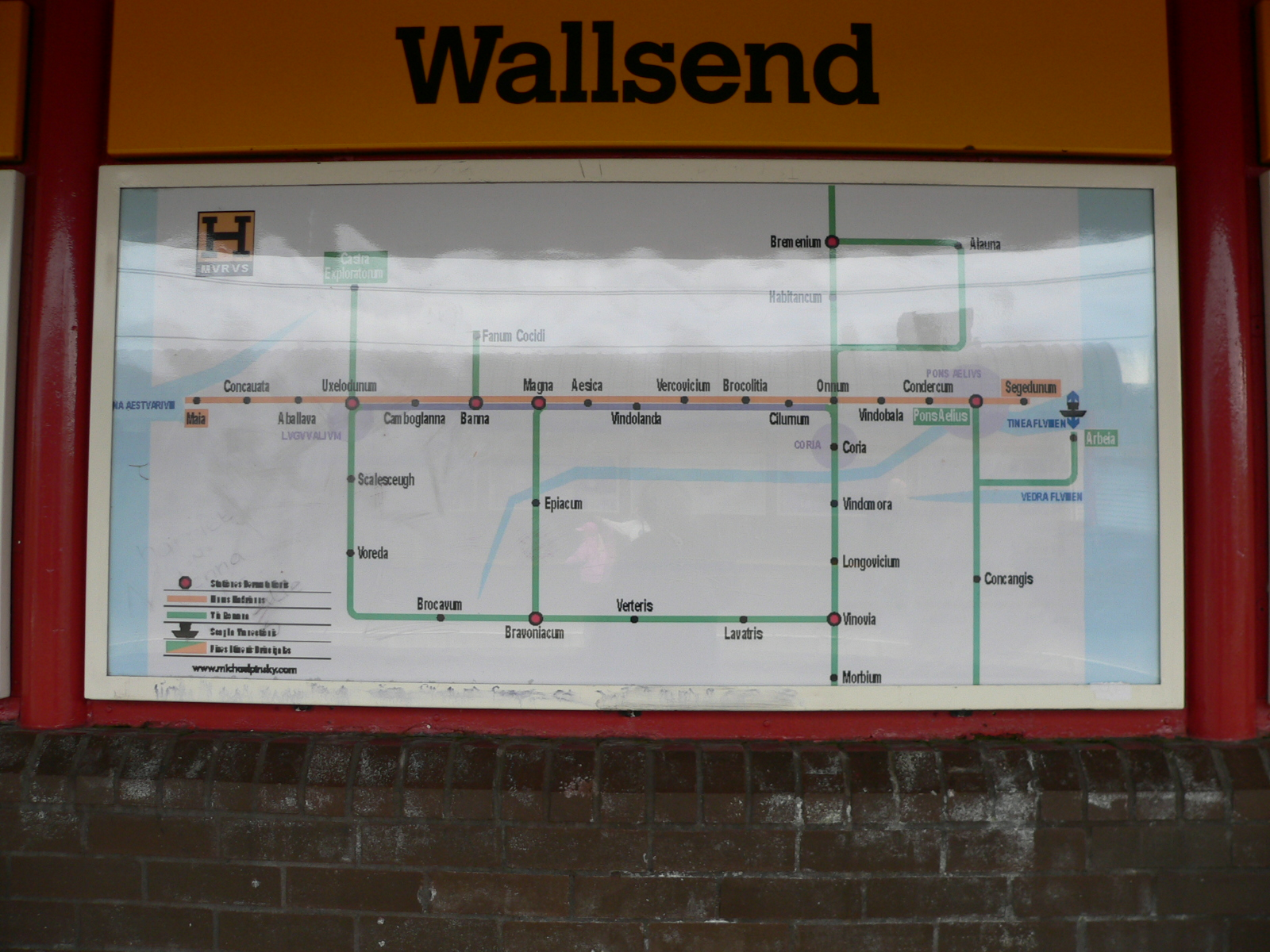
Pontis (2003)

== Policing ==
Responsibility for policing across the network is – perhaps unusually – the responsibility of two different police forces.

The Sunderland branch of the network, which runs over Network Rail infrastructure, is policed by British Transport Police. The rest of the network is policed by Northumbria Police.

== See also ==
- List of Tyne and Wear Metro stations
- Transport in Tyne and Wear
- Urban rail in the United Kingdom
