= Chillingham Road Metro station =

Metro station in Newcastle upon Tyne, England

Chillingham Road
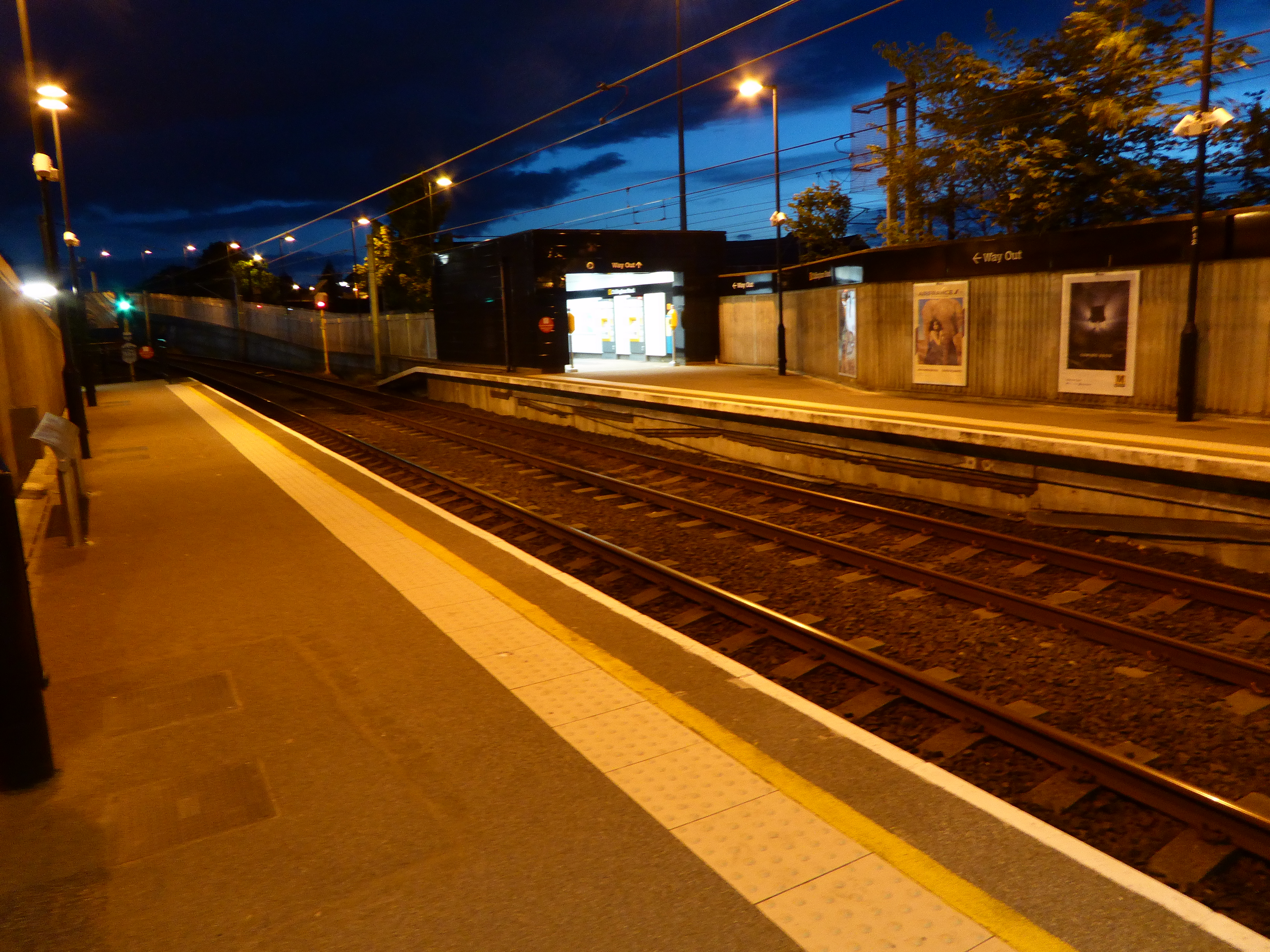

General information
- Location: Heaton, Newcastle upon Tyne; England
- Coordinates: 54°58′58″N 1°34′19″W
- Grid reference: NZ275654
- System: Tyne and Wear Metro station
- Transit authority: Tyne and Wear PTE
- Platforms: 2
- Tracks: 2

Construction
- Cycle facilities: 5 cycle pods
- Accessible: Step-free access to platform

Other information
- Station code: CRD
- Fare zone: A

History
- Original company: Tyne and Wear Metro

Key dates
- 14 November 1982: Opened

Passengers
- 2024/25: 0.428 million

Services
Preceding station	Tyne and Wear Metro	Following station
Walkergate towards South Shields via Whitley Bay	Yellow line	Byker towards St James
Location
- Location within Newcastle-upon-Tyne Location within Tyne and Wear

Chillingham Road is a station on the Tyne and Wear Metro network, located in Heaton, Newcastle upon Tyne. It joined the network on 14 November 1982, following the opening of the fourth phase of the network, between Tynemouth and St James via Wallsend. The station is located adjacent to Heaton Traction Maintenance Depot.

== History ==
It is the closest station to the former Heaton station, which closed to passengers in August 1980.

Chillingham Road was originally intended to be named Parsons, reflecting the station's proximity to the Parsons Engineering Works. The station is adjacent to Heaton Traction Maintenance Depot, as well as the East Coast Main Line.

Chillingham Road was the first surface station on the network to undergo major renovation, with work completed in October 2011. The refurbishment project involved the installation of white vitreous enamel panels, new seating and lighting, improved security and accessibility, as well as resurfaced platforms. Refurbishment work was completed in October 2011, with the station having been branded in the updated black and white corporate colour scheme.

West of Chillingham Road, the Tyne and Wear Metro route diverges from the former route of the North Eastern Railway. Immediately east of the station was a rail connection into the Heaton Traction Maintenance Depot and Parsons Engineering Works – a connection which remained in place until British Rail's re-signalling of the depot at the end of the millennium.

== Facilities ==
Step-free access is available at all stations across the Tyne and Wear Metro network, with ramps providing step-free access to platforms at Chillingham Road. The station is equipped with ticket machines, sheltered waiting area, seating, next train information displays, timetable posters, and an emergency help point on both platforms. Ticket machines are able to accept payment with credit and debit card (including contactless payment), notes and coins. The station is also fitted with smartcard validators, which feature at all stations across the network.

There is no dedicated car parking available at the station. There is the provision for cycle parking, with five cycle pods available for use.

== Services ==
As of April 2021, the station is served by up to five trains per hour on weekdays and Saturday, and up to four trains per hour during the evening and on Sunday.
