= Transport in Tyne and Wear =

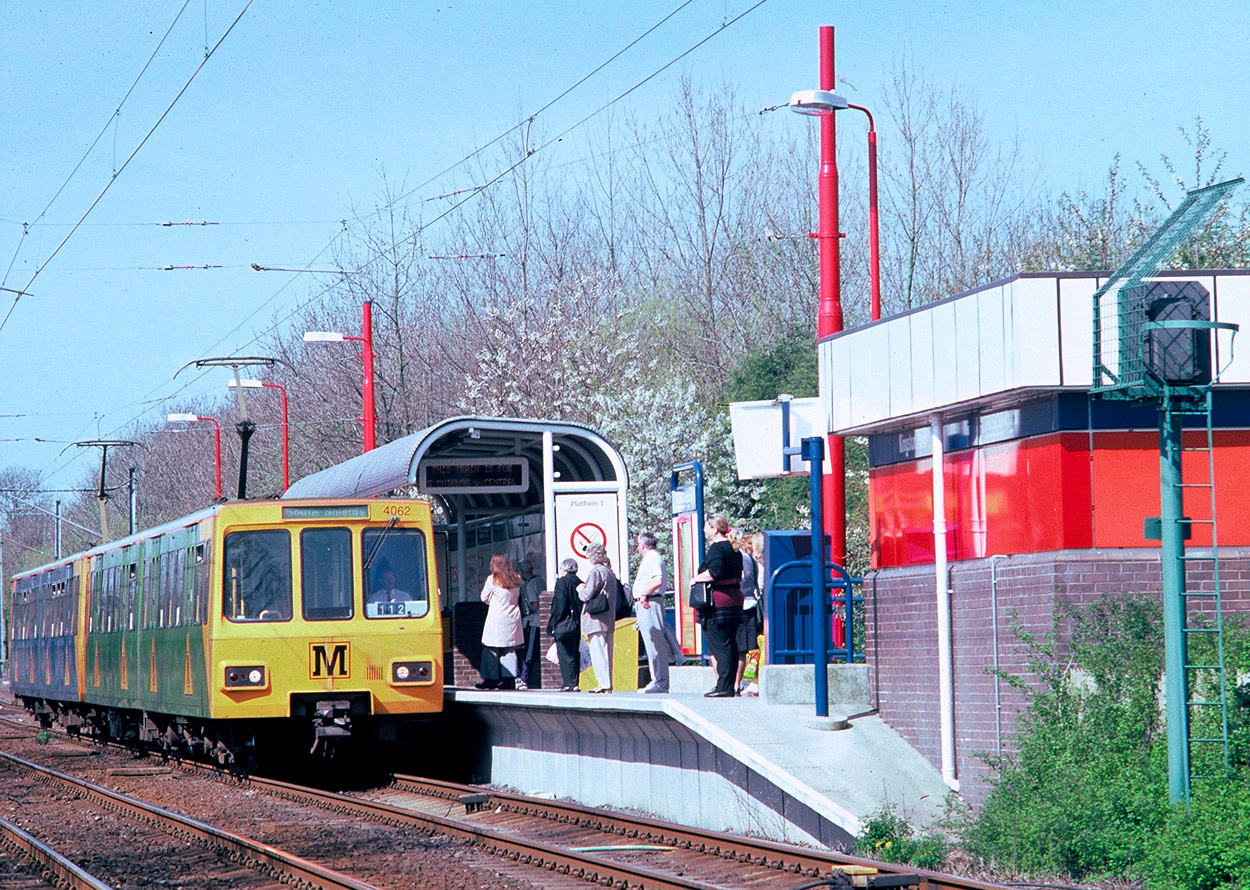
A Tyne and Wear Metro service heading for South Shields, seen at Kingston Park.

Tyne and Wear is a metropolitan area covering the cities of Newcastle upon Tyne and Sunderland, as well as North and South Tyneside, Gateshead and Washington.

Tyne and Wear is served by public transport, including the Tyne and Wear Metro, sections of the national rail network including regional and intercity services, several city and regional bus lines, the Shields Ferry, and Newcastle International Airport.

Tyne and Wear Passenger Transport Executive, trading as Nexus, are the passenger transport executive (PTE) responsible for overseeing the public transport network within Tyne and Wear, with headquarters at Nexus House in Newcastle upon Tyne.

== Rail ==
=== History ===
The first transport in Tyne and Wear was wagonways like the Tanfield Wagonway, which moved large mineral deposits across County Durham and Northumberland to estates and river barges. The Dunston wagonway was operating from as early as 1671, and transported coal to the two rivers.

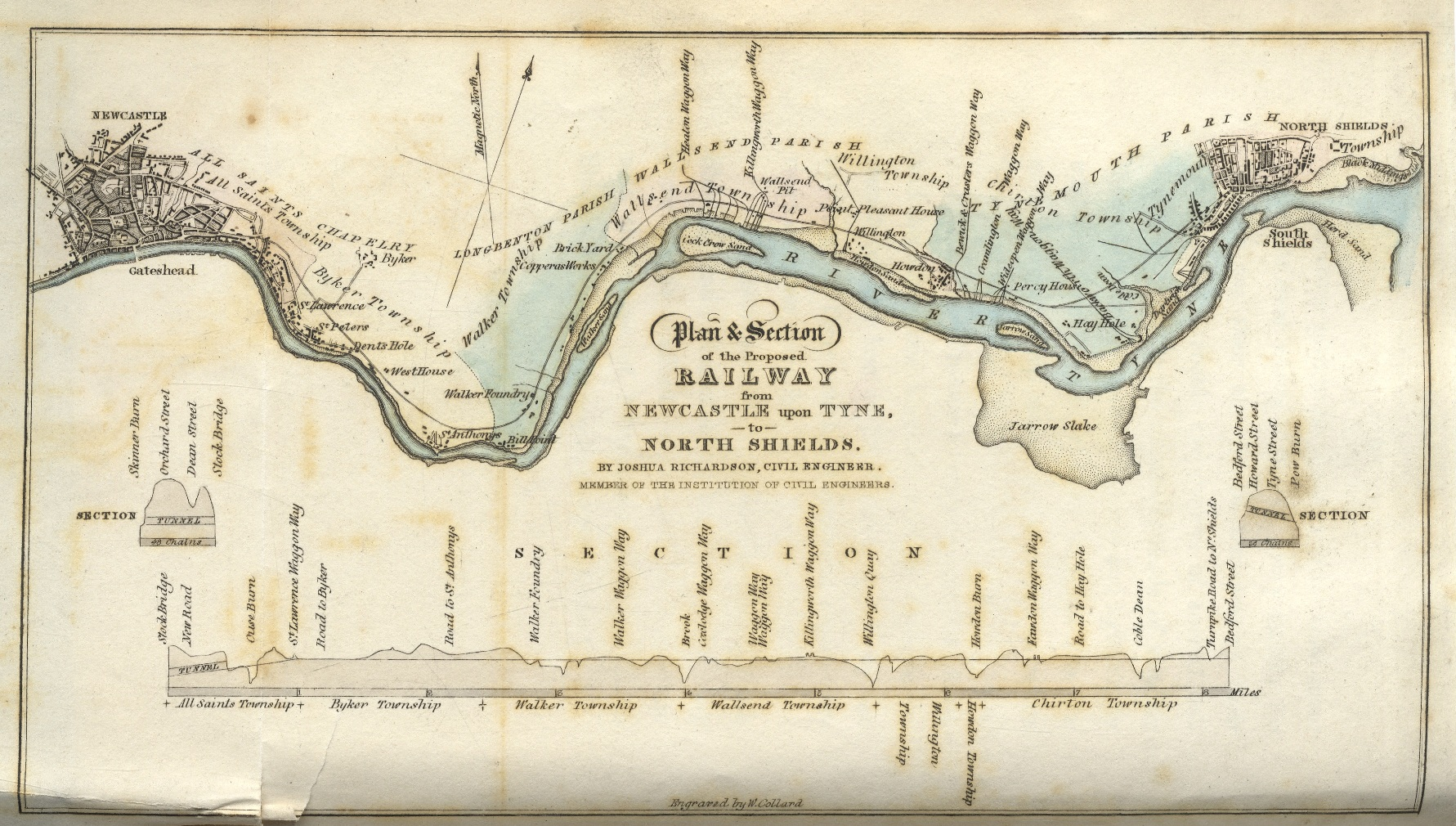
1834 plan depicting the Newcastle to North Shields Railway, etched by W. Collard.

Newcastle upon Tyne was an early pioneer in railway development, with the need to move large quantities of materials similar to the wagonways. The Stanhope and Tyne Railway opened in 1834, just nine years after the groundbreaking Stockton and Darlington Railway in nearby Teesside. The region quickly became a hub of intense competition, with numerous railways being constructed. The Newcastle and Carlisle Railway (itself opening in 1834) finished construction of Newcastle Central Station in 1847, with the Newcastle and North Shields Railway connecting its North Shields branch to the station shortly after.

Over the following years, a number of new railways and interconnecting networks were built across the area. This created one of the most dense railway networks in the UK, and helped accelerate the growth and urbanisation of the region. These routes included the Ponteland Railway, York, Newcastle and Berwick Railway, Blyth and Tyne Railway, Riverside Branch, Newcastle and Carlisle Railway, Newcastle, Leamside & Ferryhill Railway, Hylton, Southwick & Monkwearmouth Railway, Brandling Junction Railway, Durham and Sunderland Railway, Bedale and Laybourne Railway, Newcastle and South Shields Railway, as well as a number of branch lines and combined railways. These railways were mostly created to move large amounts of goods to the Tyne Docks and Sunderland Docks to be exported onto the global market, or to transport materials to the numerous shipyards and industry along the river fronts

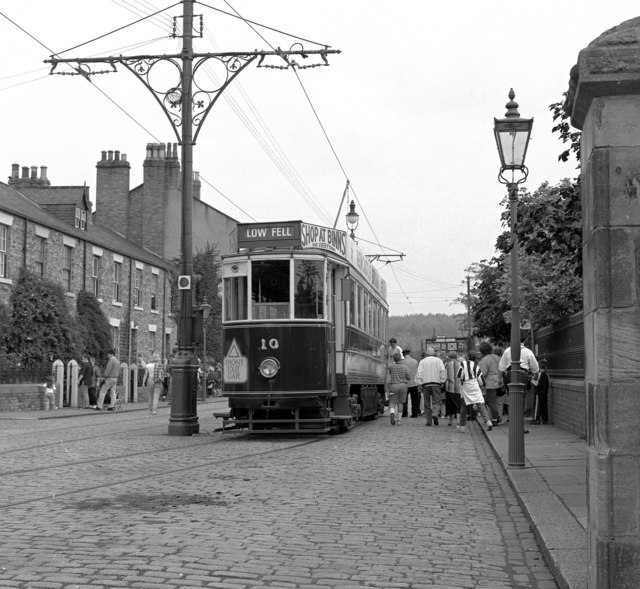
Tram No. 10 of the Gateshead and District Tramways Company at the Beamish Museum.

In the late 19th and early 20th century, several isolated system of trams were also established, with the Newcastle Corporation Tramways beginning service on 16 December 1901. The trams connected city centres to quickly sprawling suburbs, and included networks such as the Tyneside Tramways & Tramroads Company, Jarrow & District Electric Tramway, South Shields Corporation Tramways, Tynemouth & District Electric Traction Company, Gateshead & District Tramways Company, Sunderland Corporation Tramways, Sunderland District Electric Tramways, and Gosforth Park Light Railway. None of the networks exist today, with them being destroyed in the 1950s as the automobile and motorway creation became increasingly popular with both the general public and local government. However, a number of the cars were bought by Beamish Museum and are run as a heritage service at their site.

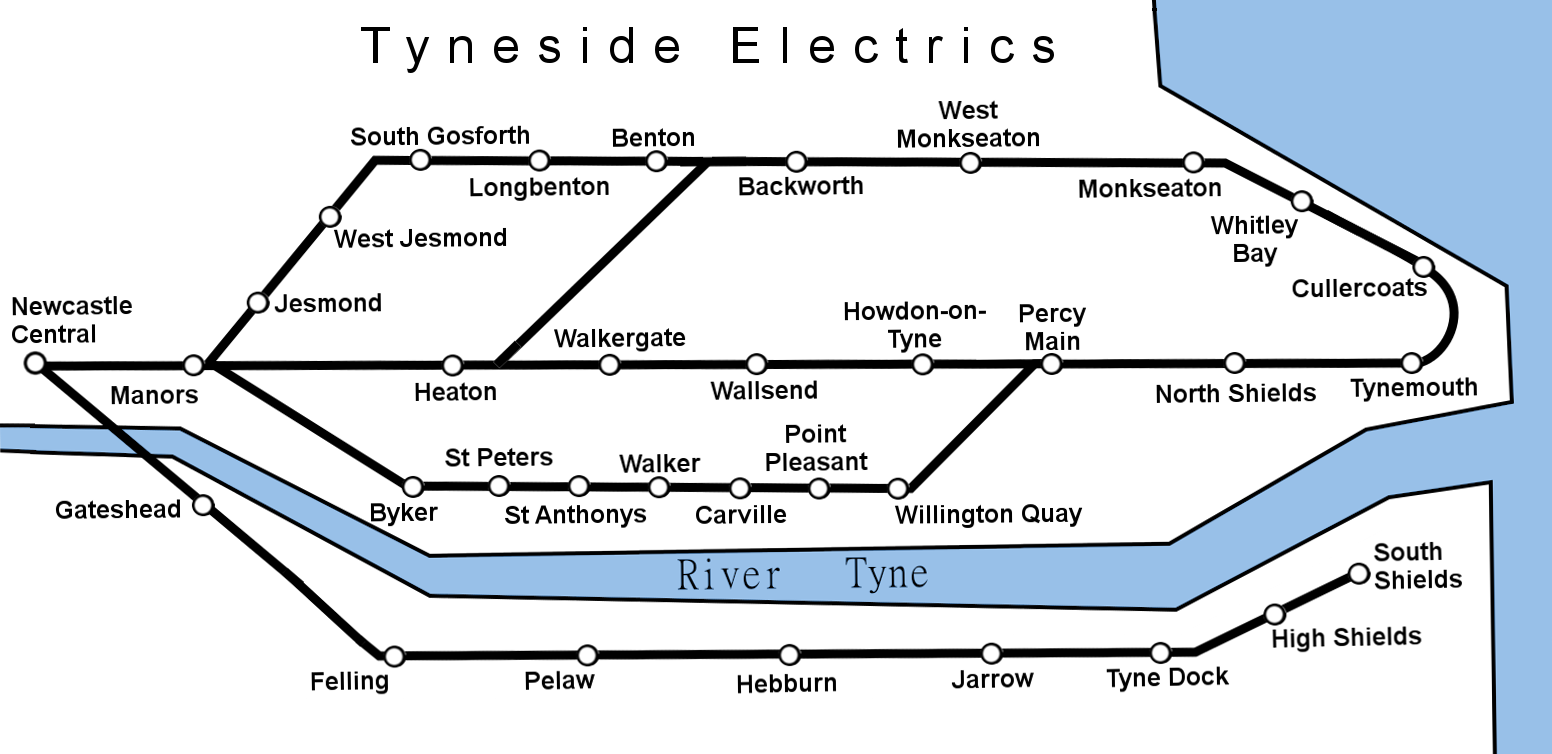
Diagram of the Tyneside Electrics network at its maximum extent between 1938–1963.

As a result of the competition from the electric tramways, passenger numbers declined heavily on the existing railways. To try and recover, the Victorian rail network was electrified, consolidated, and then restructured under Tyneside Electrics in the 1910s. The consolidation of the East Coast Mainline also meant that new nonstop express services to Edinburgh, London, Durham and Middlesbrough were now available. The improved services and routes meant that passenger numbers rebounded, and created one of the largest electrified commuter networks at the time in the UK.

However, the fortunes of the railways were short lived. In the 1960s, Tyneside Electrics became fully integrated into British Rail. The group then de-electrified the network, transitioning its services to diesel-powered trains. This decision was driven by falling passenger demand, rising operational costs, and the urgent need to replace aging infrastructure and rolling stock. The Newcastle–South Shields line lost its electrification in 1963, with the north Tyneside routes following suit in 1967. Furthermore, in the late 1960s and 1970s, a lot of the railways were closed, mainly due to British deindustrialisation, and the Beeching Act paired with central governments dismissive attitude with public transport. However, a lot of these railway closures avoided total destruction and were converted to light rail service. Lines such as the Newcastle and North Shields Railway were saved, with the line closing in 1973 and partially re-opening (east of Heaton to Tynemouth) in November 1982, following the commencement of the Tyne and Wear Metro services between Tynemouth and St. James station. Other historical rail alignments are now served by the Tyne and Wear Metro and include the Stanhope and Tyne Railway, and the Ponteland Railway of the North Eastern Railway, amongst other routes. There is also talk of further restoring former lines such as the Leamside Line to both heavy rail and Metro services. The Metro while mostly utilising former rights of way, did create some new routes, especially in the city centres near Monument and Gateshead.

=== Tyne and Wear Metro ===
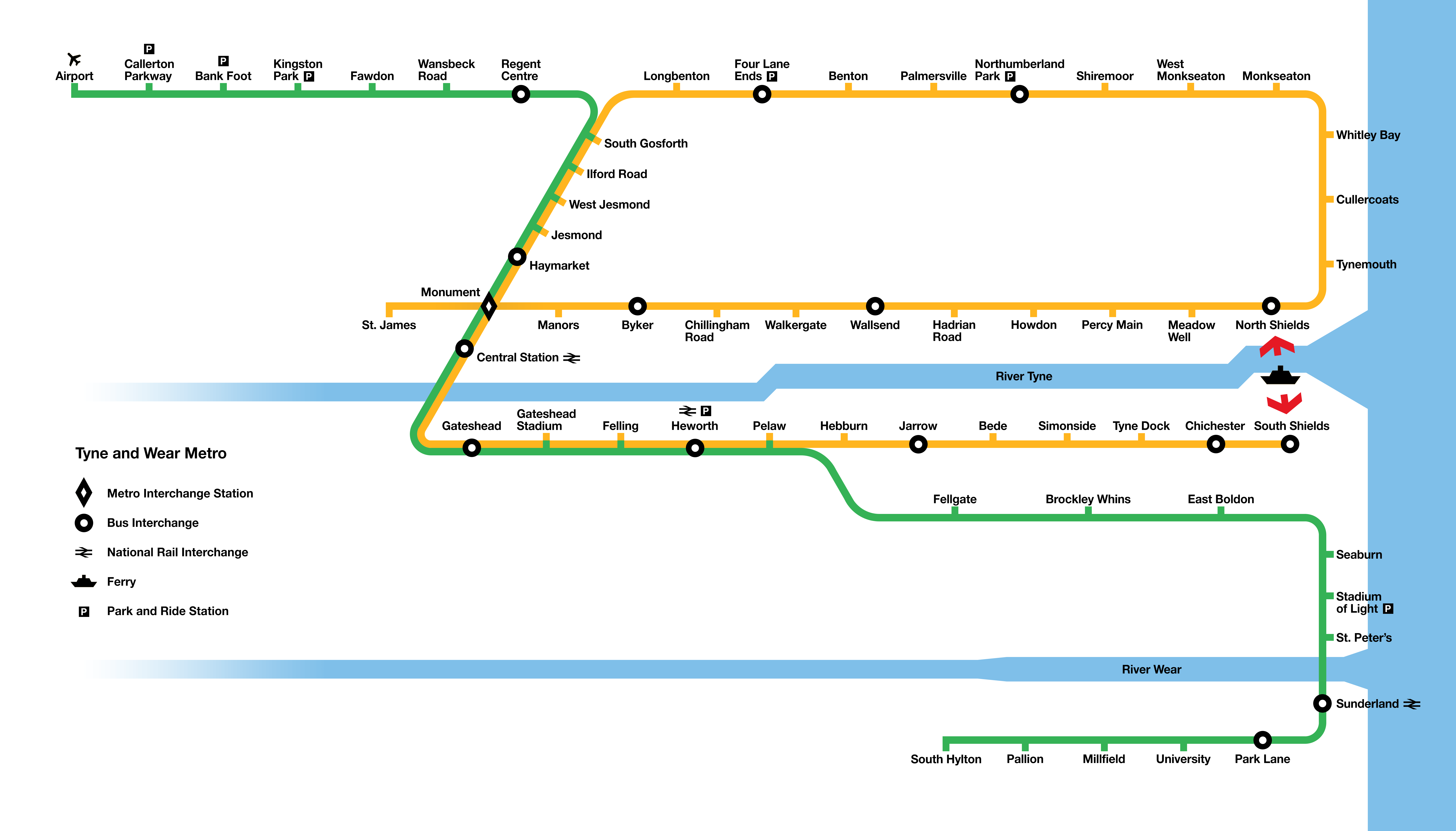
Network diagram of the Tyne and Wear Metro.

The Tyne and Wear Metro is a light rail network linking South Tyneside and Sunderland with Gateshead, Newcastle upon Tyne, North Tyneside and Newcastle Airport. The network opened in stages from 11 August 1980, and now serves 60 stations and 48 miles (77 km) of track.

The Metro is one of only two urban rail networks in the United Kingdom (outside London), with other cities have tram networks such as Edinburgh Trams, Manchester Metrolink and Sheffield Supertram.

In 2017–2018, an estimated 36.4 million passenger-journeys were made on the Metro, making it the third-most-used tram and light-rail network in the United Kingdom, after London's Docklands Light Railway (121.8 million passenger-journeys) and the Manchester Metrolink (43.7 million passenger-journeys).

The Metro network currently consists of two lines:

- Green Line: running from South Hylton Metro station and Sunderland Metro station to Newcastle City Centre, Regent Centre Metro station and Newcastle Airport Metro station.
- Yellow Line: running from South Shields Metro station to Newcastle City Centre, Whitley Bay Metro station, Wallsend Metro station and St. James.

Both lines run as frequently every 12 minutes during the day (Monday to Saturday), and every 15 minutes in the evenings and on Sundays.

This allows for a combined service of every six minutes (Monday to Saturday), and every seven to eight minutes during the evening and on Sundays between Pelaw Metro station and South Gosforth Metro station.

=== National Rail ===
As of March 2026, there are a total of eight rail stations located within Tyne and Wear: Blaydon, Dunston, Heworth, Manors, MetroCentre, Newcastle, Northumberland Park and Sunderland.

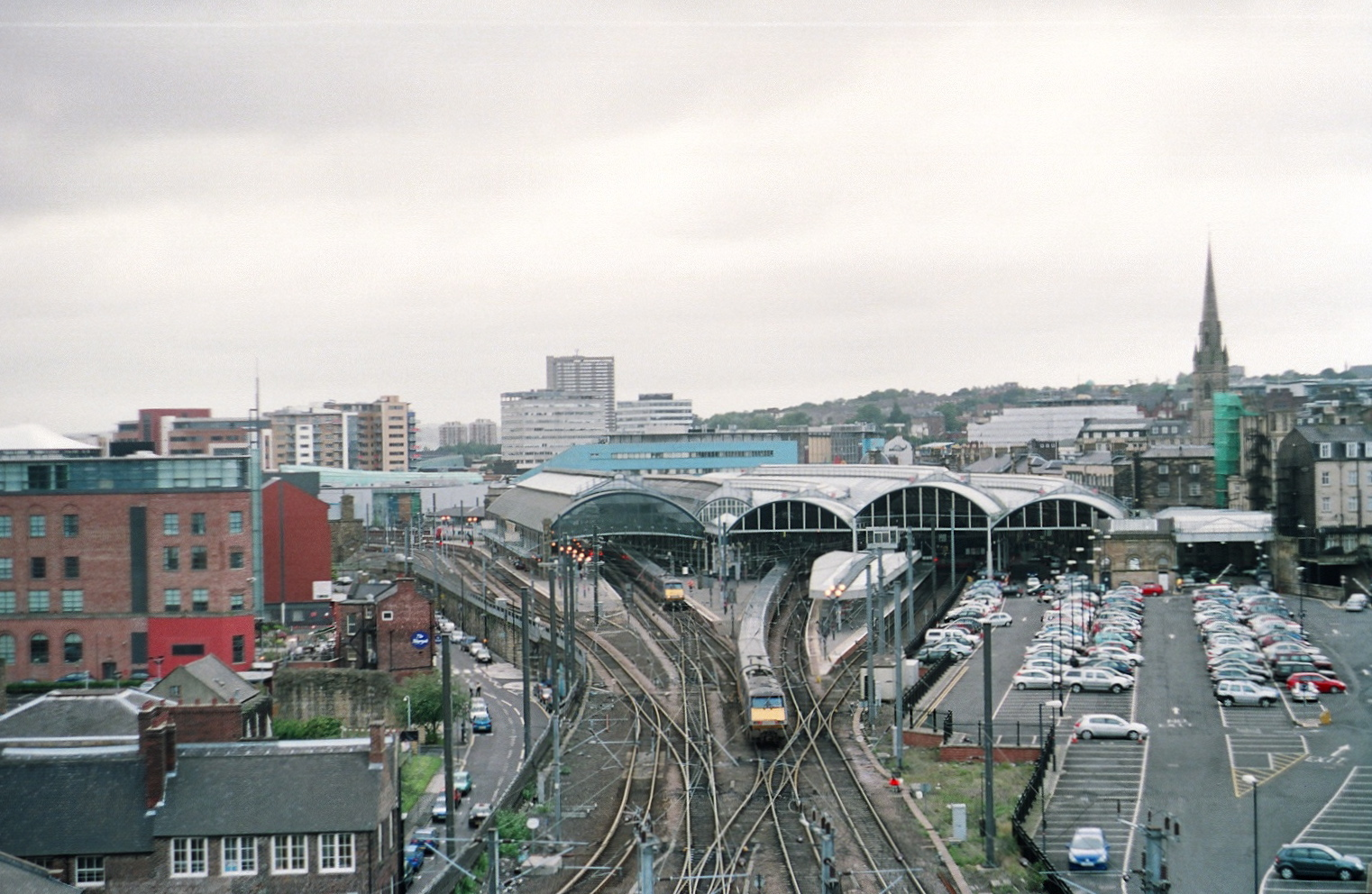
An aerial view of Newcastle Central Station.

Newcastle Central is a key calling point on the East Coast Main Line. The station originally opened in August 1850, as part of the then Newcastle and Carlisle Railway and York, Newcastle and Berwick Railway.

Currently, the station is served by CrossCountry, LNER, Northern, Lumo and TransPennine Express, with trains running to a range of destinations across the country.

CrossCountry run long-distance rail services connecting Scotland and the North East with the Midlands, South East and the South Coast. As of the December 2025 timetable change, service and frequency is as follows:

- An hourly service heading south along the East Coast Main Line towards York, Sheffield, Birmingham New Street, Bristol Temple Meads, and Plymouth, with one train a day to Cardiff Central and one train a day to Penzance.
- A two-hourly service heading south along the East Coast Main Line towards York, Doncaster, Sheffield, Birmingham New Street, then to Oxford and Reading.
- An hourly service heading north along the East Coast Main Line towards Edinburgh Waverley, with a twice-daily early evening service continuing on to Glasgow Central. Some trains also continue to Aberdeen or Dundee.

London North Eastern Railway provide long-distance, high-speed rail services, connecting Scotland and the North East with London. As of the December 2025 timetable change, service and frequency is as follows:

- Two trains per hour running north along the East Coast Main Line towards Edinburgh Waverley, with some trains continuing on to Aberdeen, Glasgow Central, Inverness or Stirling.
- Three trains per hour heading south along the East Coast Main Line towards York and London King's Cross.

Northern operates local rail services across the North East. As of the December 2025 timetable change, service and frequency is as follows:

- An hourly service heading north along the East Coast Main Line to Morpeth, with two trains per day continuing on to Chathill.
- An hourly service heading south along the Durham Coast Line towards Sunderland, Hartlepool, Middlesbrough and Nunthorpe, with some trains continuing on to Great Ayton.
- Three trains per hour heading west along the Tyne Valley Line towards Hexham, with two trains per hour continuing on to Carlisle.

TransPennine Express links the North East of England with Yorkshire, Manchester and Liverpool. As of the December 2025 timetable change, service and frequency is as follows:

- A two-hourly service heading north along the East Coast Main Line towards Edinburgh Waverley.
- An hourly service heading south along the East Coast Main Line towards York, Leeds, Manchester Victoria and Liverpool Lime Street

Lumo also run services along the East Coast Main Line as well, with limited-stop services between London Kings Cross and Edinburgh Waverley, with some services extended towards Glasgow Queen Street via Falkirk High.

Sunderland station (then Sunderland Central) station opened in August 1879, under the then North Eastern Railway. The station is now served by the Metro, with local rail services operated by Northern. The station is also served by less frequent, long-distance rail services, operated by Grand Central. LNER used to operate a once daily service but this was axed in December 2024.

Northern provide an hourly service heading south along the Durham Coast Line towards Sunderland, Hartlepool, Middlesbrough and Nunthorpe (with some trains continuing on to Whitby), and an hourly service heading north to Newcastle, with trains then joining the Tyne Valley Line, continuing on towards Hexham and Carlisle.

In March 2002, following the extension of the Metro from Pelaw to Sunderland and South Hylton rail services between Sunderland and Newcastle were amended, with Heworth Interchange becoming the single intermediate station on the route between the two cities.

Former rail stations at Seaburn, East Boldon and Brockley Whins (as well as new purpose-built stations at St. Peter's, Stadium of Light and Fellgate) are now served by the Metro, with a frequency of up to five trains per hour, and a direct link to Newcastle Airport.

In January 2006, open-access operator Grand Central was granted permission to run four trains per day between Sunderland and London King's Cross via York, with services commencing in December 2007. As of April 2022, Grand Central operate five daily services along the route.

On 14 December 2015, Virgin Train East Coast began a once-daily direct train service between Sunderland and London King's Cross. (Note: Virgin Trains East Coast now operates as London North Eastern Railway.)

== Air ==
Newcastle International Airport is the eleventh-busiest airport in the United Kingdom, with an estimated 4.81 million passenger-journeys made in 2023. It serves over 80 domestic, European and North African destinations, as well as direct flights to Cancún, Dubai and Orlando Sandford. The nearest similar-sized airports are Leeds Bradford Airport to the south, and the larger Edinburgh and Glasgow airports to the north.

The airport is easily accessible by Metro (roughly 5 am to 11 pm), with up to five trains per hour serving Newcastle upon Tyne, Gateshead and Sunderland, with connections to North Tyneside and South Tyneside. It is also served by bus services from Newcastle upon Tyne, Woolsington, Ponteland and Darras Hall.

== Bus ==
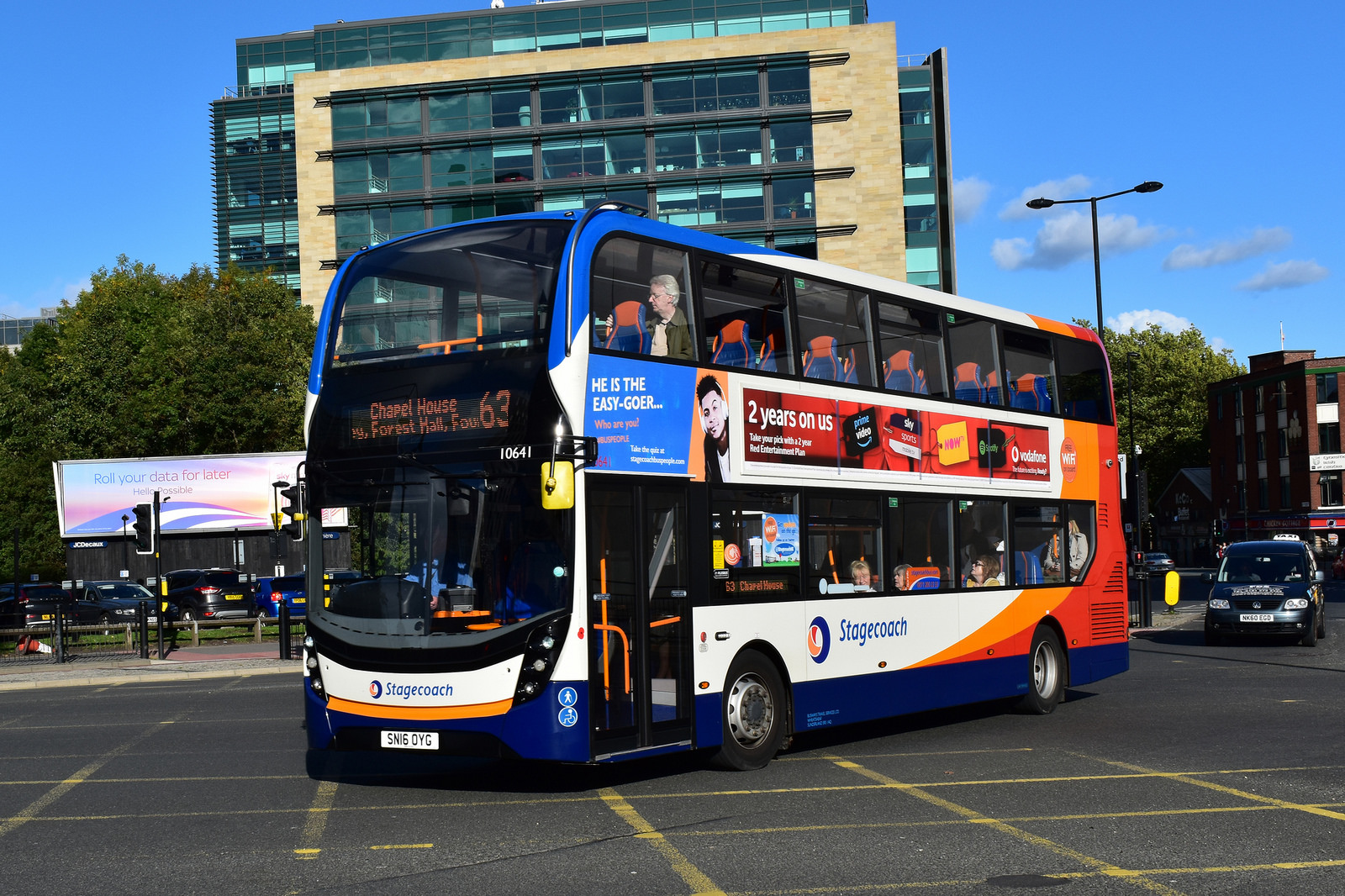
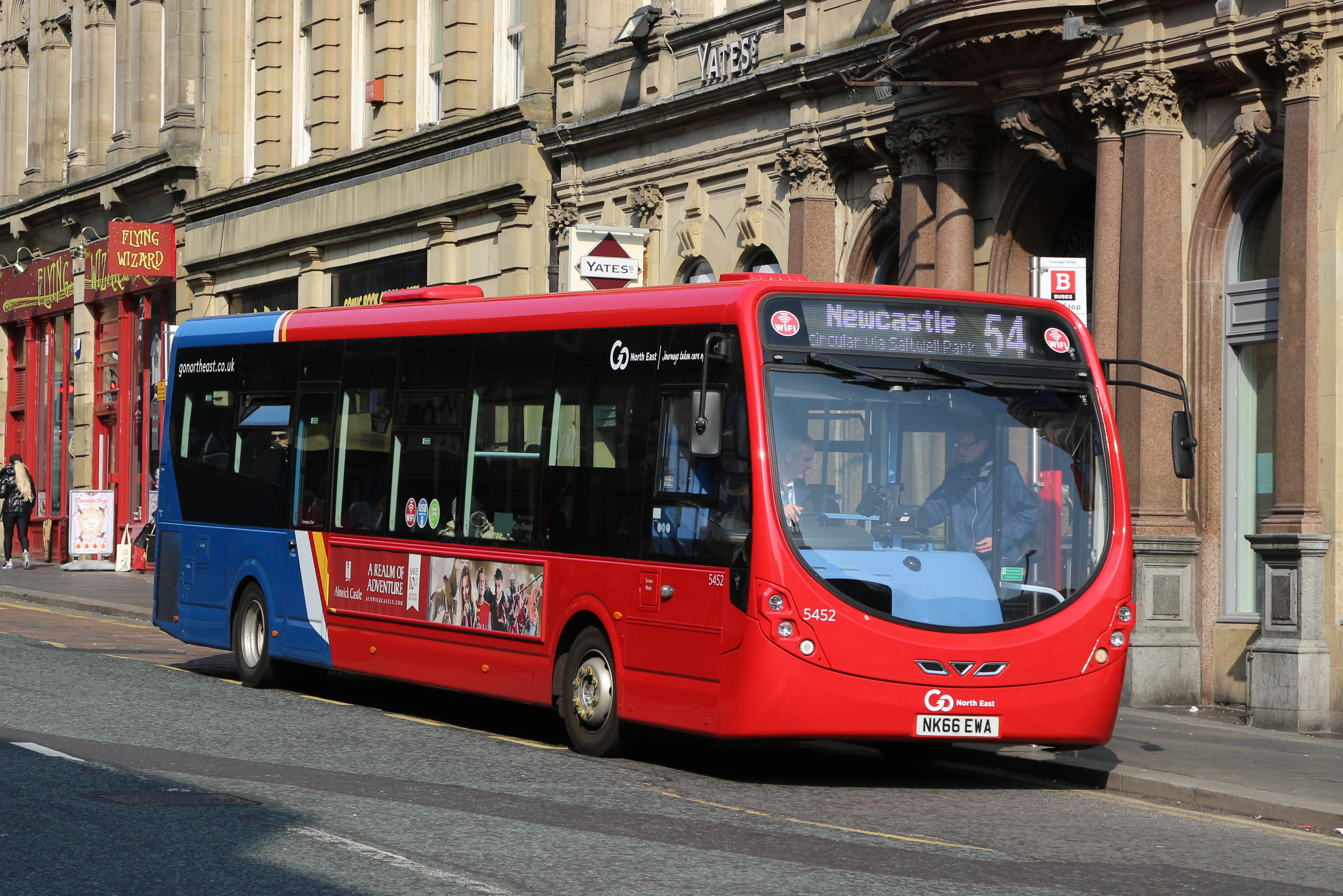
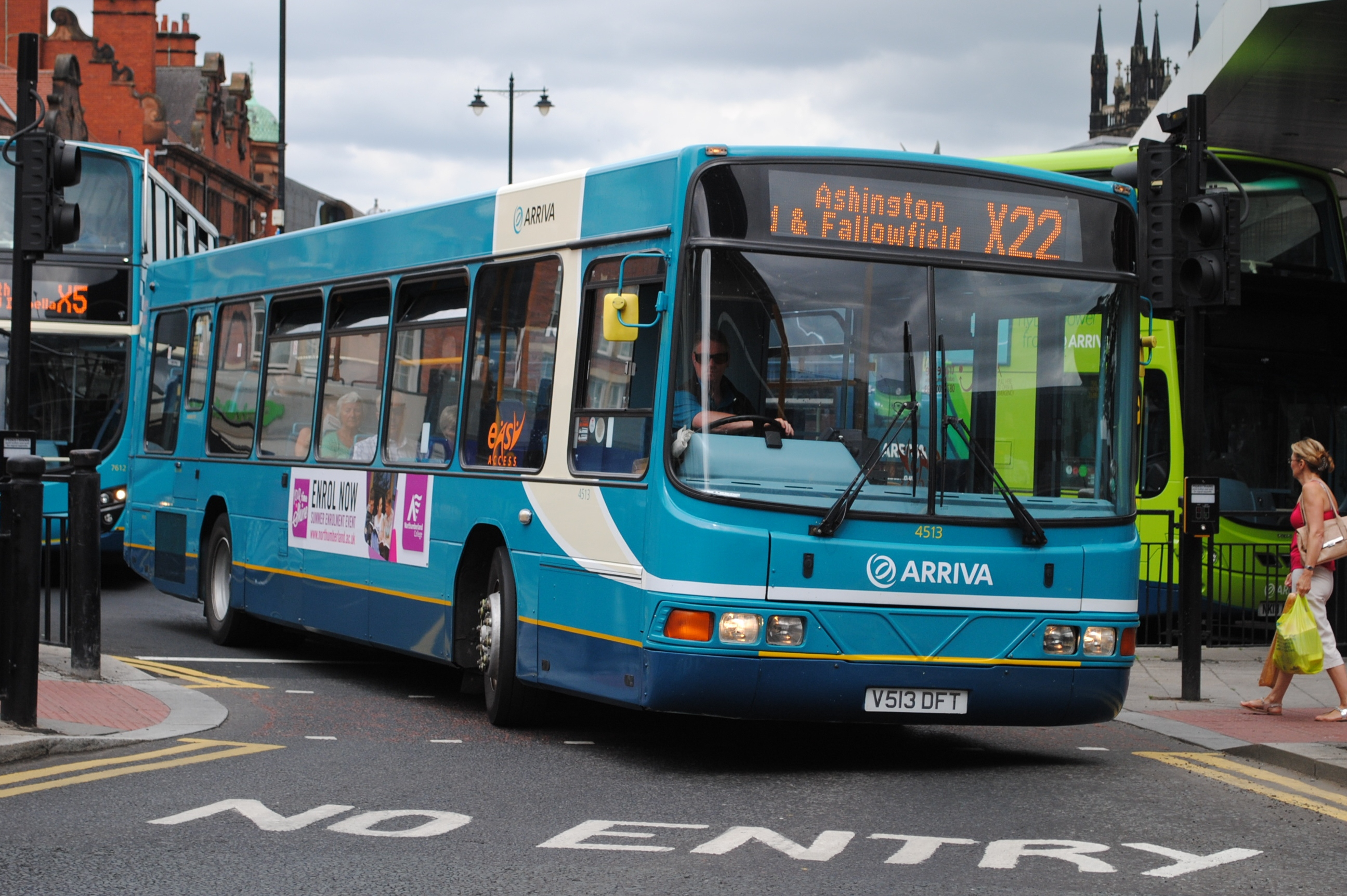
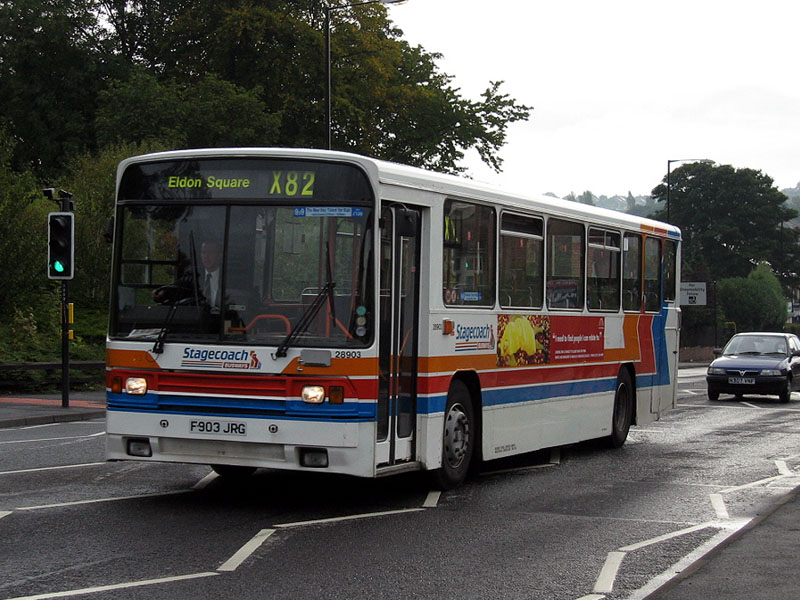
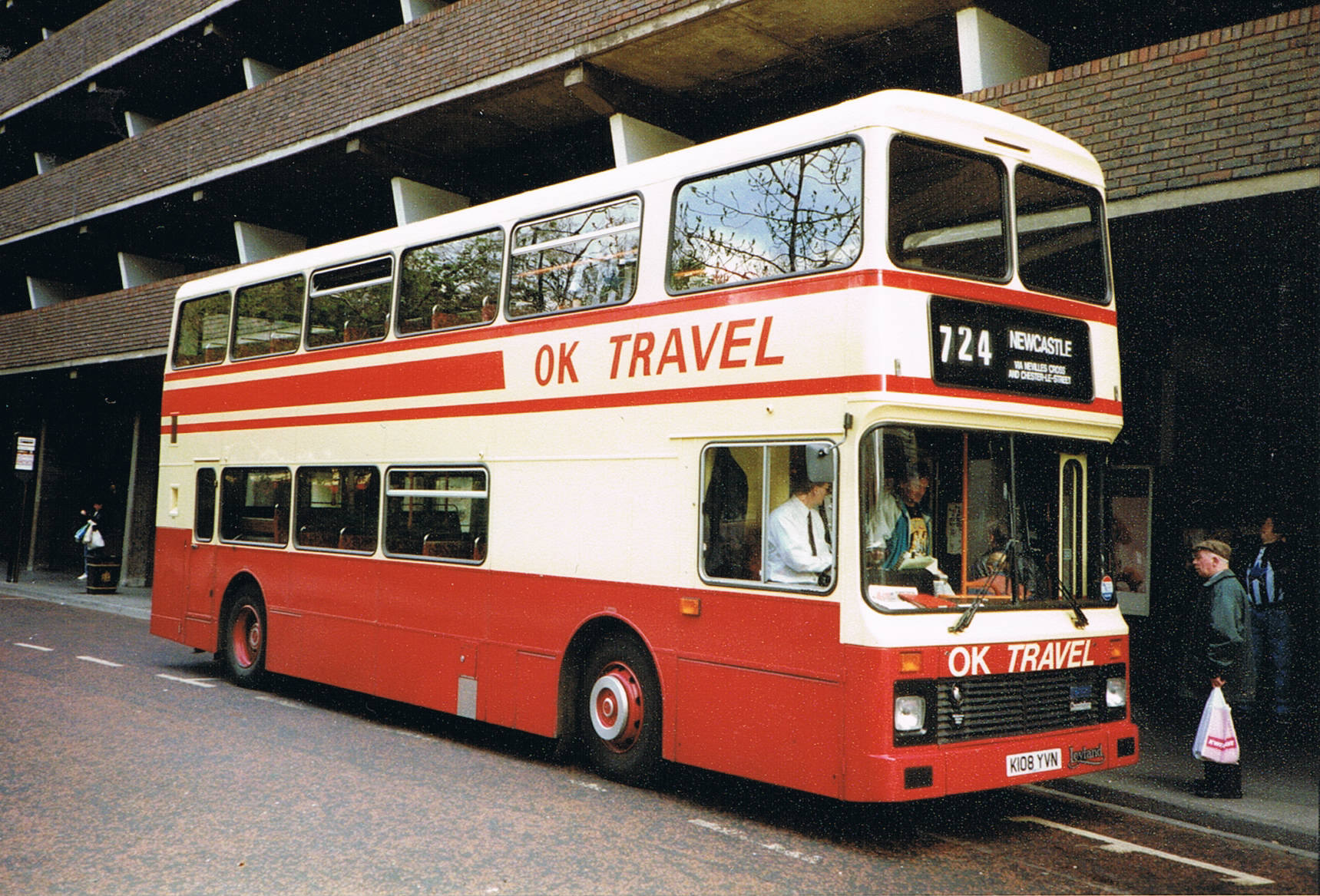
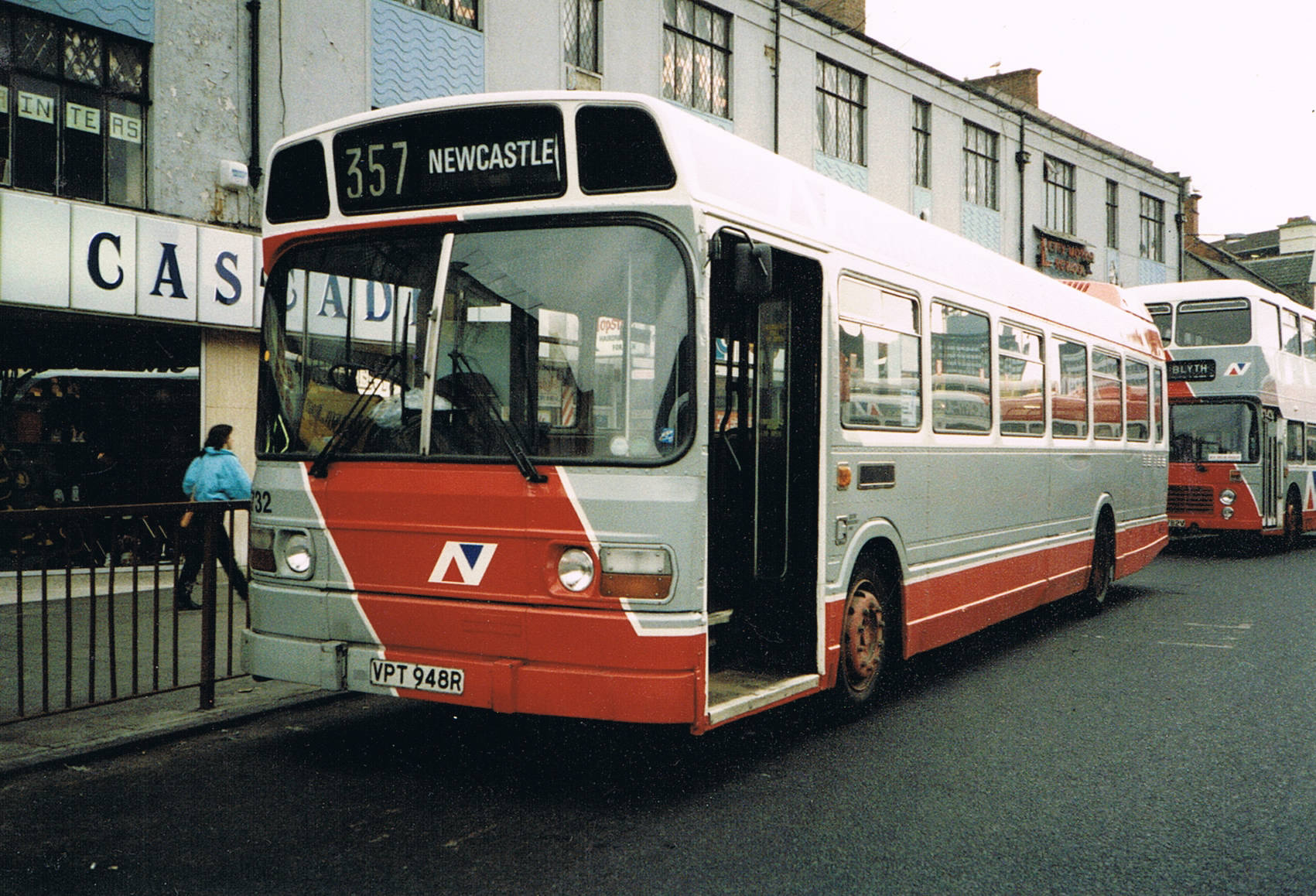
Buses in Tyne and Wear: past and present

Tyne and Wear has an extensive bus network, which is overseen by the Tyne and Wear PTE. Bus services in the county are operated predominantly by three companies: Arriva North East, Go North East and Stagecoach North East. Additional services are also run by a number of local independent operators.

Arriva North East operate from no depots in the Tyne and Wear region, but do have two depots in Blyth and Ashigton respectively. With regional bus services running from Newcastle upon Tyne to North Tyneside, (North Shields, Tynemouth and Whitley Bay) and Northumberland (Alnwick, Ashington, Berwick-upon-Tweed, Blyth, Cramlington and Morpeth). The company also operates a network of services in and around the city of Sunderland, linking with towns and villages across East Durham.

Go North East operate local and regional bus services across the county, with services extending to County Durham (Chester-le-Street, Consett, Durham and Stanley), Northumberland (Corbridge, Hexham, Prudhoe and Ponteland) and Teesside (Middlesbrough and Stockton-on-Tees). The company operate from five depots in the region: Gateshead (Riverside and Saltmeadows Road), Percy Main, Sunderland (Deptford) and Washington.

Stagecoach North East provide mainly local services, with compact networks centring around the cities of Newcastle upon Tyne and Sunderland, as well as the seaside town of South Shields. The company operates from four depots in the region: South Shields, Sunderland, Slatyford and Walkergate.

There are a number of bus stations in the county, including: Gateshead, Eldon Square, Haymarket, Metrocentre and Park Lane. Connections with local bus services are also available at a number of Metro stations, including: Four Lane Ends, Heworth, Jarrow, Regent Centre, South Shields, and Wallsend. A number of smaller bus stations are located at: Blaydon, Concord, Hetton-le-Hole, Killingworth, Washington Galleries, Winlaton and North Shields with the North Shields Transport Hub being across the road from the metro station.

== Coach ==
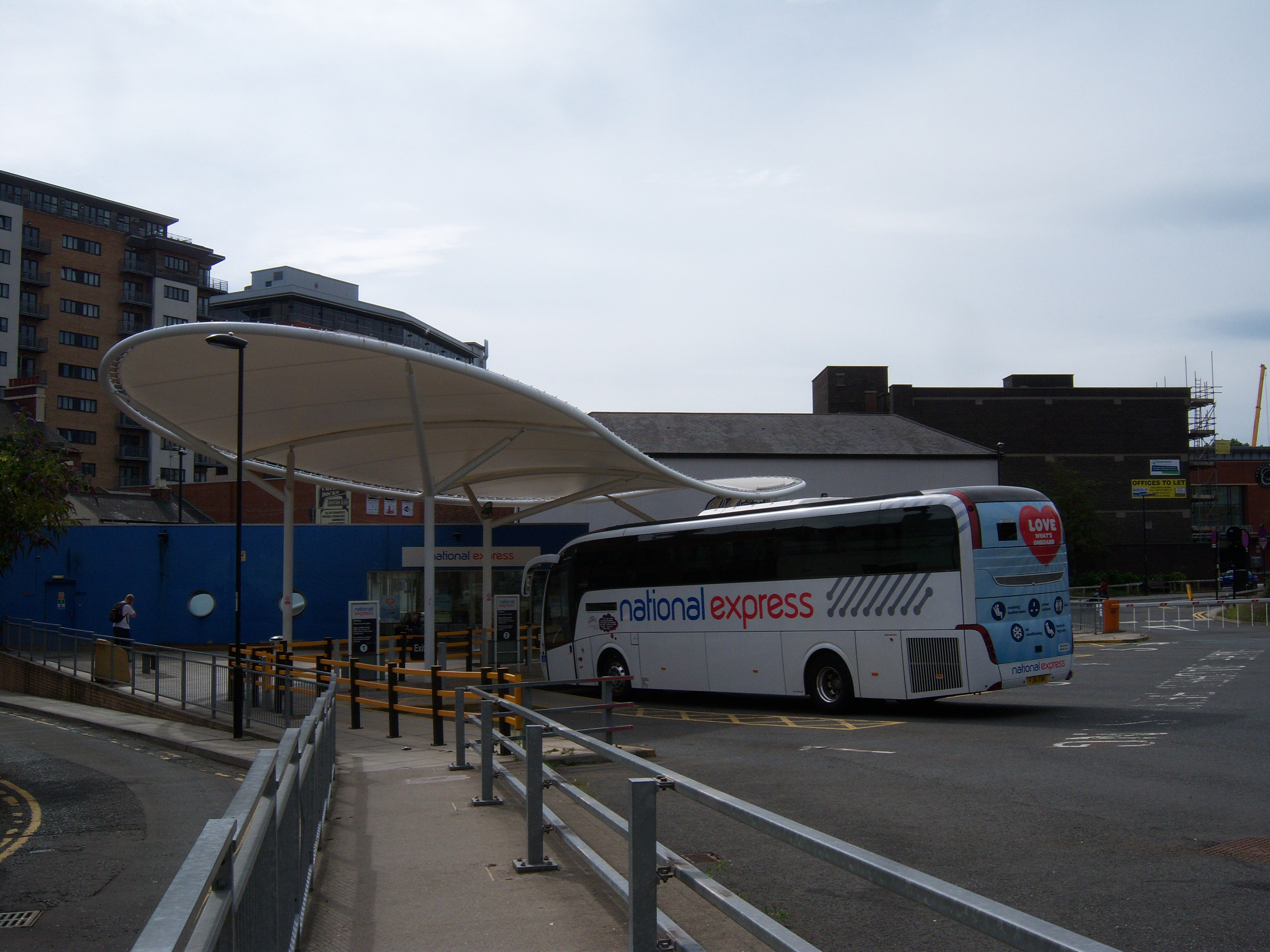
A National Express Caetano Levante, seen boarding at Newcastle coach station in September 2013.

Regional and national coach services operated by National Express depart from Newcastle coach station and Park Lane Interchange, with destinations including: Birmingham, Bristol, Chester, Edinburgh, Glasgow, Harrogate, Hull, Leeds, Liverpool, Manchester, Nottingham and London.

Services operated by Flixbus also run from John Dobson Street in Newcastle upon Tyne, as well as Park Lane Interchange, with destinations including: Birmingham, Cardiff, Coventry, Cwmbran, Edinburgh, Glasgow, Leeds, London, Manchester and Sheffield.

== Road ==
Many of the road designations in Tyne and Wear are recent. Upon completion of the Western Bypass in the early 1990s, and subsequent designation as the route of the A1, the roads between this route and the former through the Tyne Tunnel were renumbered. This saw many roads in the county change their 6-prefix to their present 1-prefix numbers. Major roads in the area include:

- A1: This route stretches north to Alnwick, Berwick upon Tweed and Edinburgh, and south to Durham, Darlington, York and London. The road covers a distance of 410 miles (660 km).
- A19: This route heads south from Seaton Burn to Sunderland via the Tyne Tunnel, then Peterlee, Middlesbrough, Thirsk, York and Doncaster.
- A69: This 54-mile (87 km) route heads west from Denton Burn to Carlisle, serving the towns and villages of Heddon-on-the-Wall, Corbridge, Hexham, Haydon Bridge, Haltwhistle, Brampton and Warwick Bridge along the route.
- A167: This route runs south from Kenton Bar to Topcliffe (near Thirsk), and was the original Great North Road, prior to the opening of the A1(M) in the 1960s. It passes through Gateshead, Chester-le-Street, Durham, Darlington and Northallerton. The A167 also has a motorway section, the A167(M), which runs for 1.1 miles (1.8 km) between Jesmond and the Tyne Bridge.
- A696: This route heads north from Kenton Bar, serving Newcastle International Airport and Ponteland, as well as the villages of Belsay, Kirkwhelpington and Otterburn, before joining with the A68 to Carter Bar, Jedburgh, St Boswells, Lauder and Edinburgh.
- A1058: The A1058, also known as the Coast Road, runs from Jesmond to Tynemouth, a route 8 miles (13 km) in length.

== Ferry ==
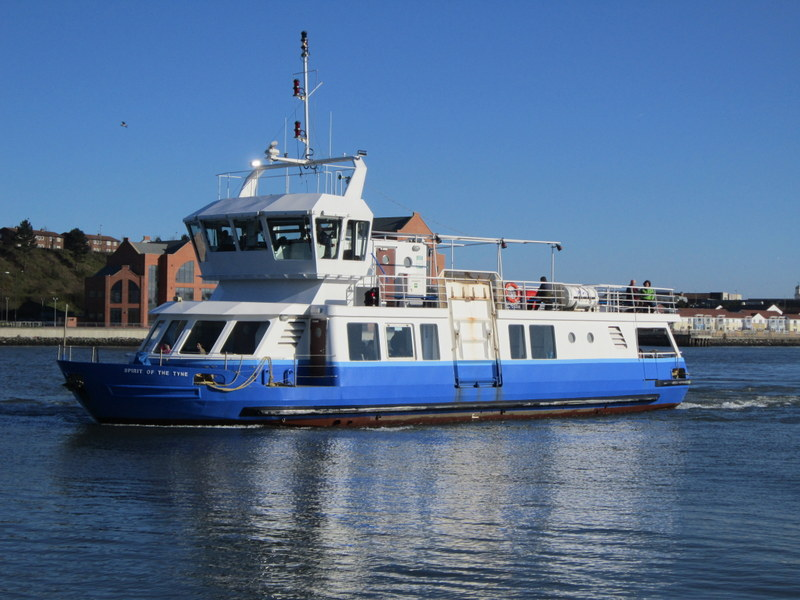
Spirit of the Tyne approaching the North Shields side of the Shields Ferry passenger link across the mouth of the River Tyne (to South Shields).

A dedicated shuttle bus service (route 327), currently operated by Go North East, connects with the ferry, running to and from Newcastle Central Station.

=== Local ferry ===
A half-hourly passenger ferry service connects North Shields to the town of South Shields on the opposite bank of the Tyne. This service is operated by Nexus. The present Shields Ferry was established in 1972. Its first female skipper was appointed in 2016. Shieldsman, a former ferry retired in 2007, has since been moved to Shoreham, West Sussex, and transformed into a houseboat.

From June to October, river trips by ferry operate.

In November 2018, the local council announced plans to consider the feasibility of moving the ferry landing. In July 2021 it was announced that the planned relocation was delayed until 2023.

=== International ferry ===
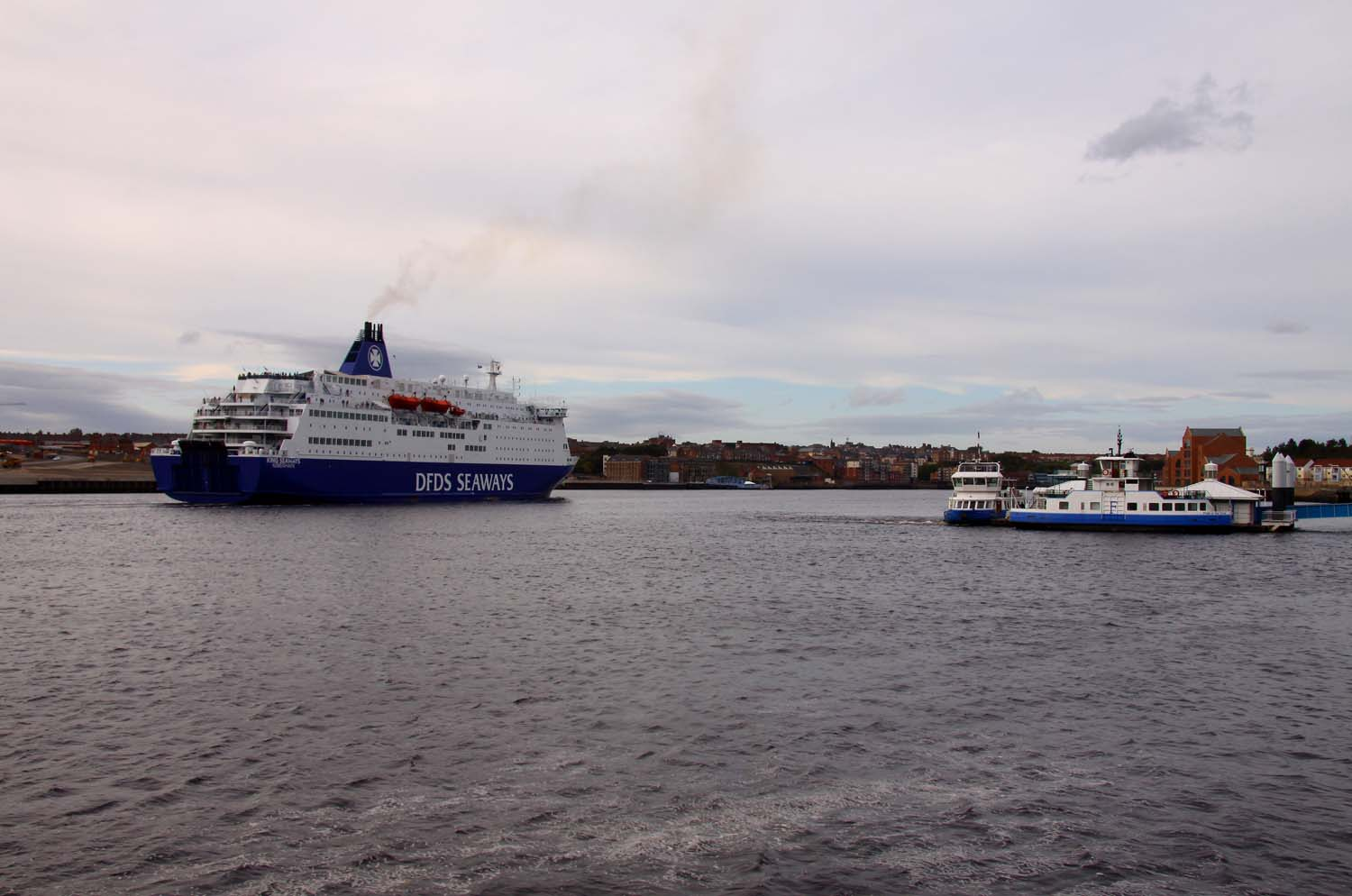
On the left is one of the DFDS Seaways cruise ships, and on the right, are the Spirit of the Tyne (left) and Pride of the Tyne (right) of the Shield Ferry service.

From the International Ferry Terminal, based at Royal Quays, the Danish company DFDS Seaways operates a daily service to IJmuiden.

The ferry service to Gothenburg, Sweden (run by DFDS Seaways), ceased operation at the end of October 2006. DFDS Seaways' sister company, DFDS Tor Line, continues to run scheduled freight ships between Gothenburg and several English ports, including Newcastle, but these have limited capacity for passengers and do not carry private vehicles.

Former routes from North Shields include Bergen, Haugesund and Stavanger.

=== Port of Tyne International Passenger Terminal ===
The passenger terminal regularly welcomes tourists travelling on cruises that call at North Shields as an access point for Newcastle upon Tyne and the wider North East of England. In 2017, 52 ships docked, bringing 120,000 visitors to the region. A number of "dudes" - red and blue powder coated figures designed by artist Perminder Kaur - can be seen on a grassy mound at the entrance to the terminal.

== Ticketing ==
=== Bus ===
Following the deregulation of bus services in 1986, bus operators in Tyne and Wear have been able to set their own routes, fares and timetables. However, the current North East Mayor, Kim McGuinness, has intentions of bringing bus services back under public ownership and allowing for unified ticketing. It was announced in 2024 that Pop cards from the Tyne and Wear metro will soon be accepted on local buses, but as of 2026 this change has not yet happened.

=== Rail ===
Local rail services in Tyne and Wear are operated by Northern. Tickets must be bought before travel at stations with ticketing facilities, these being Heworth, Newcastle and Sunderland. Passengers boarding at Blaydon, Dunston, Manors and Metrocentre can buy tickets on board the train.

National Rail services on the Northumberland Line also accept Pop cards, and fares are integrated into the Tyne and Wear Metro fare system and fare zones. This allows for free transfers to Metro services at Manors, Central Station, and Northumberland Park.

=== Tyne and Wear Metro ===
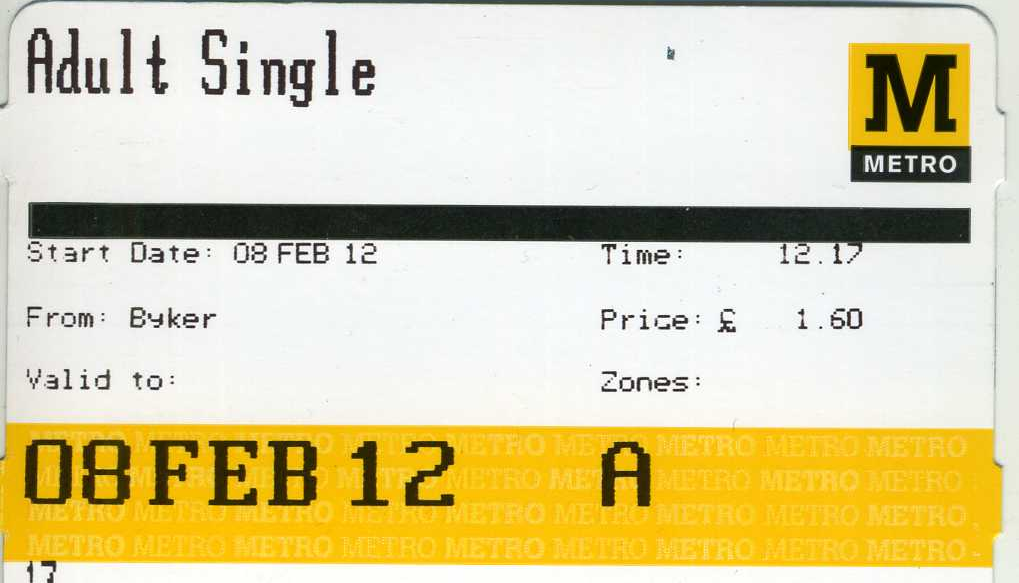
Ticket for the Tyne and Wear Metro from 2012.

The Tyne and Wear Metro has a simple fare structure, with the network being split into three zones (A, B and C, with an additional zone D for Northumberland Line services operated on the National Rail network). Tickets are offered as single, day, week, four-weekly and annual.

Metro season tickets (weekly, four-weekly and annual) covering zone A are valid on bus services 53 and 54, as well as bus service Q3 between St Peter's Basin and Haymarket.

Metro tickets (excluding single journey tickets) covering all zones (A+B+C) are valid for travel on the Shields Ferry.

Further discounts are available for infrequent travellers with Pop PAYG, for students and young people with Pop & Pop Blue, and concessionary pass holders with a Metro Gold Card. It is also possible to use a smartphone via Pop card app on Android.

=== Shields Ferry ===
The Shields Ferry has a simple fare structure, offering single, day, week and four week tickets.

All Metro tickets (excluding single journey tickets) covering all zones are valid for use on the Shields Ferry.

All tickets valid on the ferry are also valid for travel on the 19 and 317 buses between the North Shields ferry landing and North Shields town centre.

=== Multi-operator tickets ===
Multi-operator travel tickets are offered by Pop, Network One, Transfare and Transport North East (TNE) tickets.

Pop is a smart card system that is currently used on the Metro and Northumberland Line, with plans to integrate it to local buses. The standard Pop map has four zones: A, B, C, and D. Pop cards can be season tickets, which are valid for a set amount of zones for a set period of time, or pay-as-you-go (PAYG) tickets, which are valid everywhere and calculate your lowest fare automatically. Season tickets are only available as physical cards, but PAYG tickets can be physical cards or a digital card on Android phones.

Network One travel ticket allows for unlimited travel on most buses, some local rail, Metro and the Shields Ferry, within the Tyne and Wear area. The Network One map has four zones: One, Two, Three, and Four. Tickets available are DayRover (one day), week, four week, and annual. Network One tickets are not valid on the Northumberland Line.

Transfare tickets allow for a single journey made of two legs within Tyne and Wear using different types of transport, provided that the final journey is started within 90 minutes of buying the ticket. Metro and Rail both count as just one of the two legs. The Transfare Map has three zones: Yellow, Green, and Grey. Transfare tickets are not valid on the Northumberland Line. The price of Transfare tickets can vary slightly, depending upon the transport operator selling the ticket. For uses other than a single journey, or a single journey made of more than two legs, a Network One season ticket represents better value-for-money than the Transfare ticket.

Transport North East (TNE) tickets are day tickets valid for unlimited travel on most buses, some local rail, Metro and the Shields Ferry across the entirety of Tyne and Wear (as well as Northumberland and County Durham). There are also tickets covering just Northumberland and just County Durham. There was previously a ticket covering just Tyne and Wear, but this was axed to reduce costs. TNE tickets are not valid on the Northumberland Line.
