= Washington Galleries bus station =

Bus station in Washington, Tyne and Wear, England

Washington Galleries Bus Station
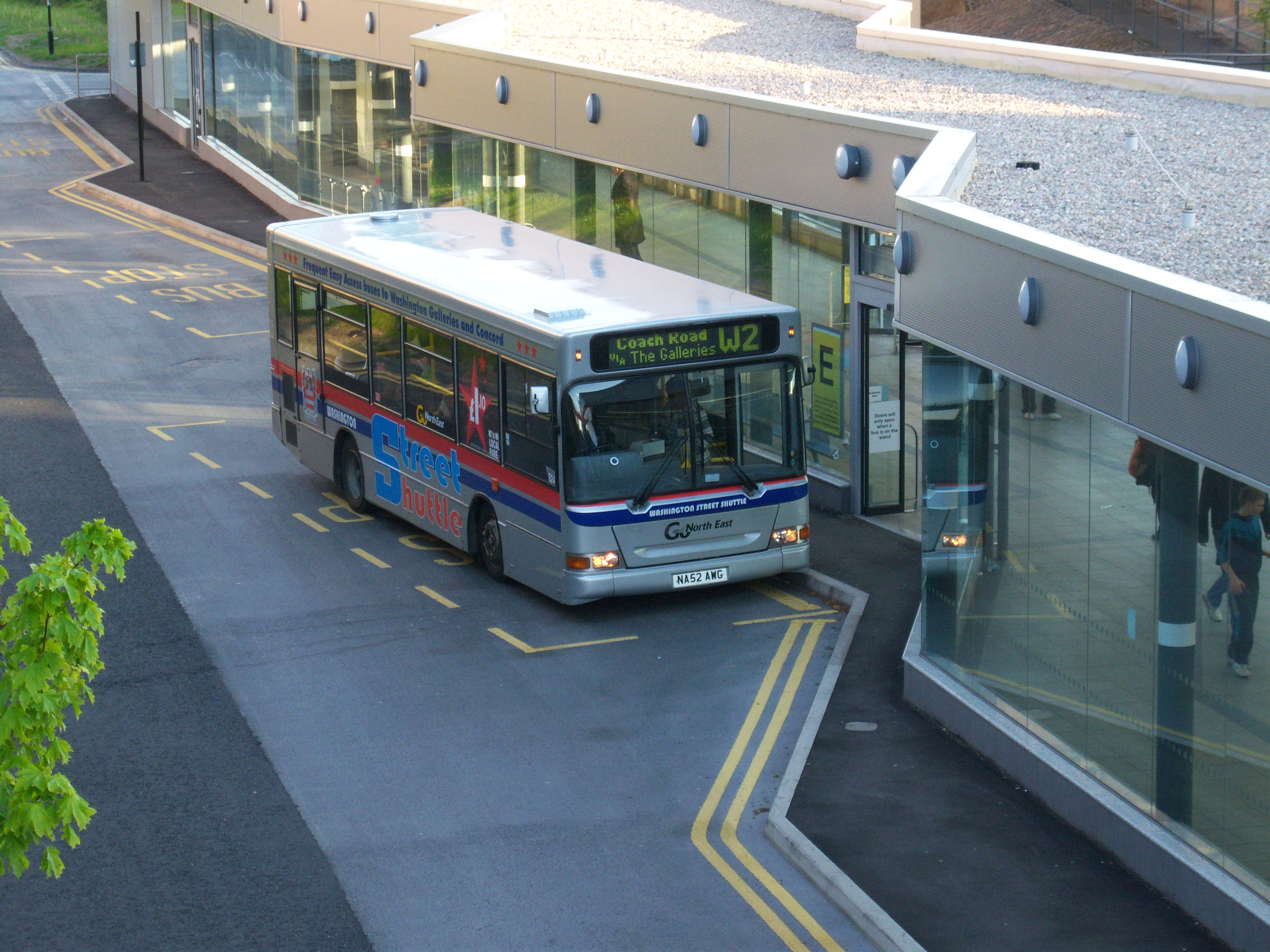

General information
- Location: Galleries Shopping Centre, Washington; City of Sunderland, Tyne and Wear
- Coordinates: 54°53′57″N 1°32′02″W
- Owner: LCP
- Operator: Tyne and Wear PTE
- Bus stands: 8 (lettered A-F + 2 unlettered)
- Bus operators: Arriva North East; Go North East; Gateshead Central Buses; L&G Coaches

Other information
- Fare zone: Network One: 3 (Map); Transfare: Grey

History
- Opened: 9 October 2008; 18 years ago
Location
- Location within Tyne and Wear

Washington Galleries Bus Station is located in the town of Washington in Tyne and Wear. The bus station was constructed in the early 1970s, to serve the adjacent Galleries Shopping Centre, which opened in 1974.

== History ==
The bus station first opened in 1972, with the first service (169) linking New Washington with the newly-opened Woolco.

The original bus station was demolished and re-built in the late 2000s, as part of a £2.5 million refurbishment project. The new facility opened in October 2008.

== Stands and services ==
The station has eight bus stands, six for departures (stands A to F), and two alighting points (both unnamed). The departure stands are each fitted with seating, next bus information displays, and timetable posters.

The bus station is served mostly by Go North East's local bus services, with frequent routes running in and around Washington, as well as County Durham, Gateshead, Newcastle upon Tyne and Sunderland. Independent operators Gateshead Central Buses, operating the 37, TB22 and TB23, and L&G Coaches, operating the 939 and 960, additionally serve the bus station. As of August 2026, the stand allocation is:

Stand	Route	Destination
A	4	Houghton-le-Spring via Fatfield, Penshaw, Shiney Row, Bournmoor & Fence Houses
A	939	Sunderland Park Lane Interchange via Concord, Waterview Park, Hylton Red House & Southwick
A	X1	Peterlee or South Hetton express via Herrington Burn, Houghton-le-Spring, Hetton-le-Hole, Easington Lane, South Hetton & Easington Village
A	X1A	Dalton Park express via Herrington Burn, Houghton-le-Spring, Hetton-le-Hole, Easington Lane & Murton
A	X1B	Picktree Village
B	2	Sunderland Park Lane Interchange via Lambton, Harraton, Fatfield, Shiney Row, Penshaw, Hastings Hill & Sunderland Royal Hospital
B	37	Doxford Park via Biddick Woods, Shiney Row, Herrington Burn & East Herrington
B	84	Concord via Oxclose & Blackfell
B	939	Team Valley
C	8	Stanley via Biddick, Fatfield, Harraton, Rickleton, Chester-le-Street, Pelton, Newfield, Grange Villa, Beamish & East Stanley
C	50	Durham via Lambton, Harraton, Rickleton, Chester-le-Street, Waldridge, Chester Moor, Plawsworth, Arnison Centre & Framwellgate Moor
C	81	Gateshead via Lambton, Ayton, Barley Mow, Birtley, Eighton Banks, Wrekenton & Low Fell
C	82	Queen Elizabeth Hospital via Lambton, Ayton, Barley Mow, Birtley, Eighton Banks & Wrekenton
C	82A	Queen Elizabeth Hospital via Fatfield, Rickleton, Barley Mow, Birtley, Eighton Banks & Wrekenton
D	4	Heworth via Concord, Usworth, Follingsby Park & Wardley
D	X1	Newcastle express via Springwell Village, Wrekenton, QE Hospital & Gateshead
D	X1A	Newcastle express via Springwell Village, Wrekenton, QE Hospital & Gateshead
D	X1B	Newcastle express via Springwell Village, Wrekenton, QE Hospital & Gateshead
E	8	Sunderland Park Lane Interchange via Waterview Park, Teal Farm, Castletown & Enterprise Park
E	8A	Sunderland Park Lane Interchange via Waterview Park, Teal Farm, Hastings Hill & Sunderland Royal Hospital
E	50	South Shields (Note: Some journeys (Sunday daytime) extend to Marsden.) via Concord, IAMP, Boldon Colliery, Whiteleas, Chichester & Westoe
E	960	South Shields via Hebburn, Jarrow, Brockley Whins, Harton Nook, Marsden, Horsley Hill & Westoe
E	960	Waterview Park
E	TB22	Wrekenton via Blackfell, Springwell Village & Eighton Banks
E	TB23	Wrekenton via Blackfell, Springwell Village & Eighton Banks
F	81	Waterview Park via Washington Village & Teal Farm
F	82	Waterview Park via Washington Village & Teal Farm
F	85	Coach Road Estate via Biddick, Barmston & Concord

== See also ==
- Galleries Shopping Centre
