= Concord, Sunderland =

Area in Tyne and Wear, England

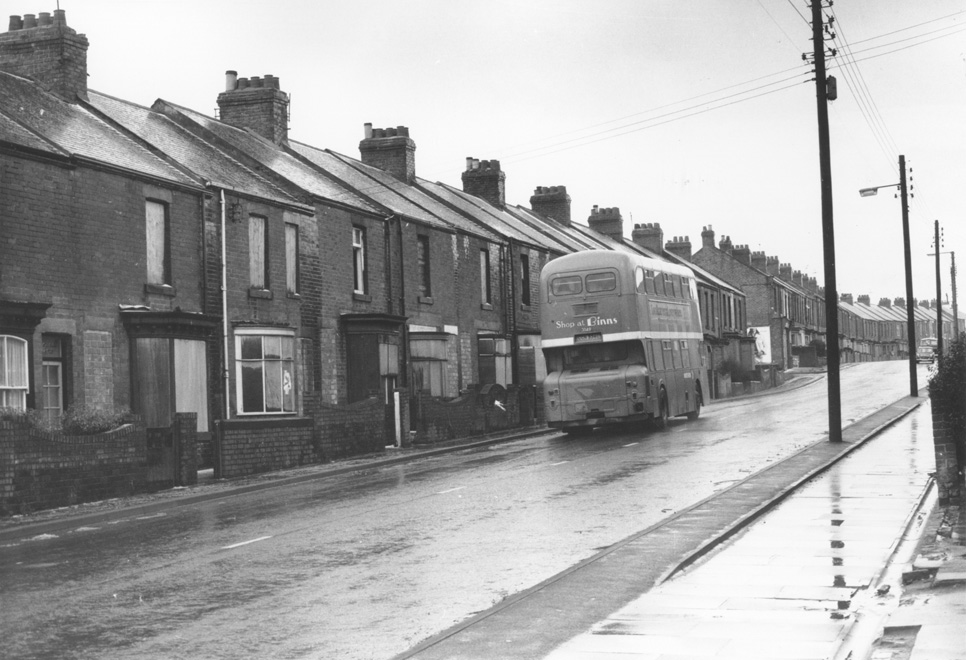
Woodland Terrace, Concord, in the 1960s

Concord is an area of Washington in City of Sunderland, Tyne and Wear, England. Historically, Concord was part of County Durham, joining the county of Tyne and Wear in 1974, following its creation.

Washington is located between the cities of Durham, Sunderland and Newcastle upon Tyne hence, it has close ties to all three cities.

The main street in Concord's centre is Front Street, which comprises several local shops, bars and cafés. Concord houses the Washington Millennium Centre, situated in The Oval, which provides youth clubs for children and young people, as well as having an outdoor football area and other regular activities. The village also has a small health centre, the Victoria Health Centre, situated on Victoria Road, near to the bus station.

Neighbouring villages include Albany, Donwell, Usworth, Sulgrave and Follingsby. Nearby industrial estates include Stephenson and Hertburn, as well as the Nissan UK Factory.

Washington School is also nearby, just north of the Sunderland Highway.

== Transport ==
Concord Bus Station

General information
- Location: Washington; City of Sunderland, Tyne and Wear
- Coordinates: 54°54′48″N 1°31′25″W
- Owner: Tyne and Wear PTE
- Operator: Tyne and Wear PTE
- Bus stands: 6

Other information
- Fare zone: Network One: 2 (Map); Transfare: Grey
Location
- Location within Tyne and Wear

Concord Bus Station is served by Go North East's local bus services, with frequent routes running in and around Washington, as well as County Durham, Gateshead, Newcastle upon Tyne and Sunderland. The bus station has six departure stands (lettered A–F), each of which is fitted with seating, next bus information displays, and timetable posters.

As of September 2024, the stand allocation is:

Stand	Route	Destination
A	83	Washington Galleries via Barmston & Biddick
B	4	Houghton-le-Spring via Washington Galleries, Fatfield, Penshaw, Shiney Row, Bournmoor & Fence Houses
B	50	Durham via Washington Galleries, Lambton, Harraton, Rickleton, Chester-le-Street, Waldridge, Chester Moor, Plawsworth, Arnison Centre & Framwellgate Moor
B	83A	Chester-le-Street via Washington Galleries, Fatfield, Harraton, Rickleton & Barley Mow
B	939	Team Valley via Washington Galleries
C	50	South Shields (Note: Some journeys (Sunday daytime) extend to Marsden.) via IAMP, Boldon Colliery, Whiteleas, Chichester & Westoe
C	56	Sunderland via IAMP, Hylton Castle, Hylton Red House & Southwick
C	939	Sunderland via Waterview Park, Hylton Red House & Southwick
D	85	Washington Galleries via Blackfell & Oxclose
D	85A	Oxclose via Blackfell
D	ED2	East Durham College via Washington Galleries, Shiney Row, Herrington Burn, Newbottle, Houghton-le-Spring, Hetton-le-Hole, South Hetton, Easington Lane & Murton
E	4	Heworth via Usworth, Follingsby Park & Wardley
E	85	Coach Road Estate
F	56	Newcastle via Springwell Village, Wrekenton, QE Hospital & Gateshead
