= Park Lane Interchange =

Tyne and Wear Metro station in Sunderland

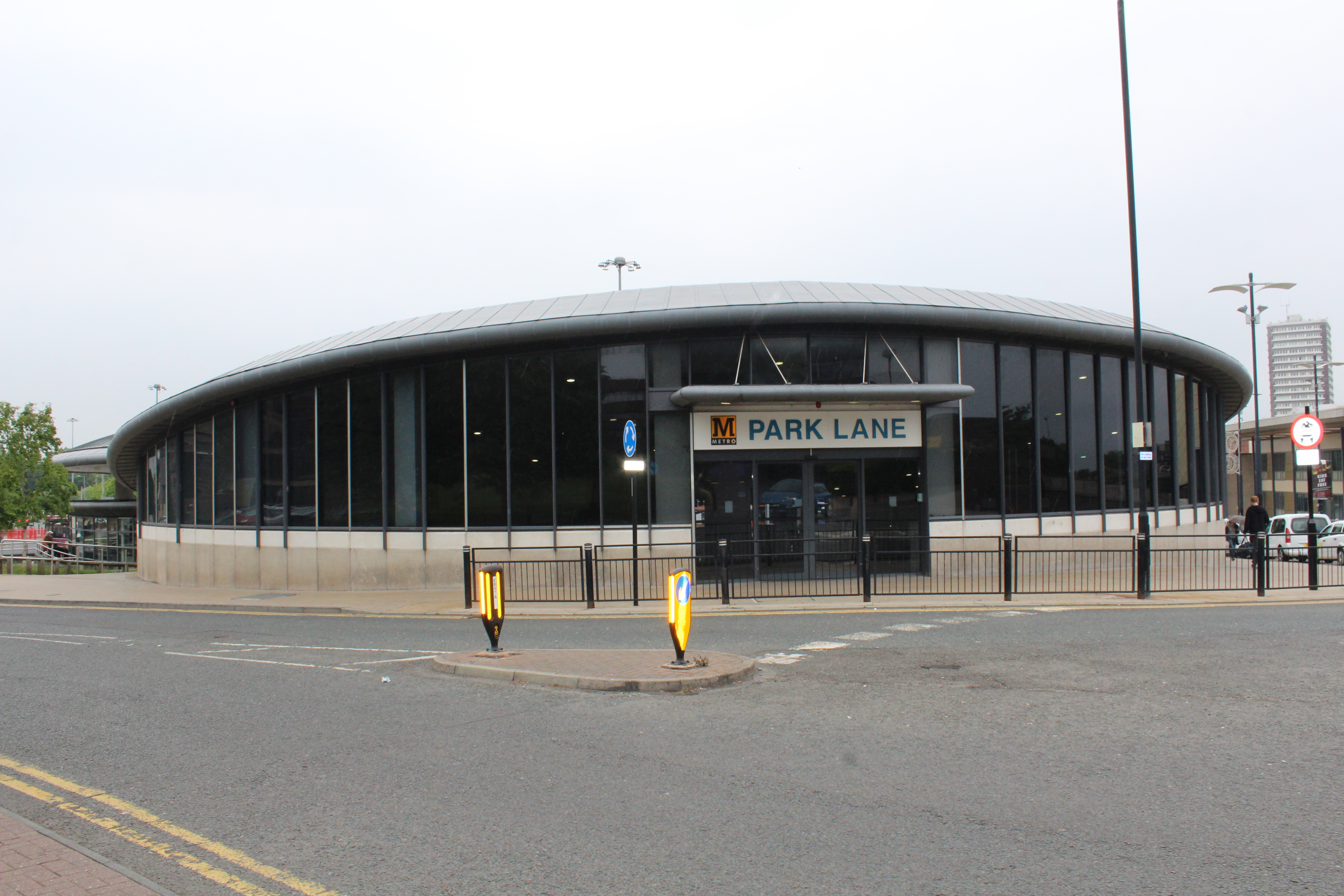

General information
- Location: Park Lane, Sunderland, SR1; City of Sunderland; England
- Coordinates: 54.9023°N 1.3846°W
- OS Grid ref: NZ 395 565
- System: Multimodal transport hub including Tyne and Wear Metro station
- Owner: Nexus
- Line: Green line
- Platforms: 2
- Tracks: 2
- Bus stands: 21
- Bus operators: Arriva North East; Go North East

Construction
- Cycle facilities: 12 cycle pods, with space for 24 bikes
- Accessible: Step-free access throughout, with lifts from street-level to platforms and level-boarding to trains

Other information
- Station code: PLI
- Fare zone: C

History
- Original company: Tyne and Wear Metro

Key dates
- March 1999: Bus station opened
- 28 April 2002: Metro station opened (Note: The Metro station's opening was delayed, owing to the late delivery of wall panels.)

Passengers
- 2024/25: ▲748,565 (Tyne and Wear Metro)

Services
Preceding station	Tyne and Wear Metro	Following station
University towards South Hylton	Green line	Sunderland towards Airport
Location
- Location within Sunderland Location within Tyne and Wear
Notes
- Metro passenger statistics from Nexus.

Park Lane Interchange is a multimodal transport hub, serving the port city of Sunderland in Tyne and Wear, England. It is located on the site of the former Park Lane Bus Station, which dated from the 1930s. The Interchange's Bus Station opened in May 1999, followed by the Metro station on 28 April 2002, after the opening of the extension from Pelaw to South Hylton.

== History ==
The Metro station is located below Park Lane bus station, which opened in May 1999, as a replacement for the former Park Lane Bus Station and Sunderland Central Bus Station.

Along with other stations on the line between Fellgate and South Hylton, the station is fitted with vitreous enamel panels designed by artist, Morag Morrison. Each station uses a different arrangement of colours, with strong colours used in platform shelters and ticketing areas, and a more neutral palette for external elements.

== Facilities ==
The interchange houses a newsagent, a coffee shop, a bakery and Amazon collection lockers.

Step-free access is available at all stations across the Tyne and Wear Metro network, with two lifts providing step-free access to platforms at Park Lane.

The interchange is equipped with ticket machines, which accept payment by credit and debit cards (including contactless payment), notes and coins. The interchange is also fitted with smartcard validators, which feature at all stations across the network.

A pay and display car park (operated by Sunderland City Council) is available, with 630 spaces, as well as a taxi rank. There is also the provision for cycle parking, with twelve cycle pods available.

== Metro Services ==
As of June 2026, the station is served by up to five trains per hour – in each direction – on weekdays and Saturdays, and up to four trains per hour during the evening and on Sundays. In the westbound direction, trains run to South Hylton. In the northbound direction, trains run to Newcastle Airport via Gateshead and Newcastle City Centre. (Note: From the opening of the Sunderland extension in March 2002, the Yellow line ran from St James to South Hylton. In December 2005, the southern branches were swapped, with the Yellow line running to South Shields instead of the Green line, which then operated between Newcastle Airport and South Hylton)

The Metro station was used by 748,565 passengers in 2024/25, slightly lower than the pre-pandemic figure of 778,365 in 2018/19.

== Bus services ==
The Bus Station opened in May 1999, as a replacement for Sunderland's two previous city centre bus stations, Central Bus Station and Park Lane Bus Station.

It is served by Arriva North East and Go North East's local bus services, with frequent routes serving Sunderland and South Tyneside, as well as County Durham, Gateshead, Newcastle upon Tyne and Teesside. The bus station has 19 departure stands (lettered A–V), with an additional two stands used by long-distance coach services. Each stand is fitted with a waiting shelter, seating, next bus information displays, and timetable posters.

As of June 2026, the stand allocation is:

Stand	Route	Destination
A	X6	Peterlee express via Grangetown, Seaham Interchange & Dalton Park
A	Metro replacement bus	
B	22	Durham via Ryhope, New Seaham, Dalton Park, Easington Village, Easington Colliery, Peterlee, Shotton Colliery, Thornley & Sherburn Park Hospital
C	61	Peterlee via Grangetown, Hollycarrside, Mount Pleasant, Dalton Park, Murton, Easington Lane & Easington Village
C	62	Doxford International Business Park via Grangetown, Hollycarrside, Tunstall & Doxford Park
C	62A	Doxford International Business Park via Grangetown, Ryhope Village, Tunstall & Vicarage Farm
C	63	Silksworth via Grangetown, Hollycarrside, Tunstall & Doxford Park
D	60	Seaham via Grangetown, Ryhope, Mount Pleasant, Seaham Interchange, Parkside Heathway
E	Not in use	
F	56	Newcastle Market Street via Southwick, Nissan Factory, Concord, Springwell, Queen Elizabeth Hospital, Wrekenton & Gateshead Interchange
G	Not in use	
H	2	Washington Galleries via Royal Hospital, Pennywell Industrial Estate, Penshaw & Fatfield
J	78	Consett via Hastings Hill, Shiney Row, Chester-le-Street & Stanley
K	8	Stanley via Hylton Retail Park, Washington Galleries, Chester-le-Street, Pelton & Beamish Museum
K	8A	Washington Galleries via Royal Hospital, Pennywell Industrial Estate
K	81 (Note: Sundays only.)	Gateshead Interchange via Hylton Riverside, Castletown, Washington Galleries, Birtley, Wrekenton & Low Fell
L	20	Durham via East Herrington, Houghton-le-Spring, Gilas Lane, East Rainton, West Rainton, Carrville & Gilesgate Moor
L	20A	Durham via East Herrington, Houghton-le-Spring, Rainton Bridge Industrial Estate, East Rainton, West Rainton, Carrville & Gilesgate Moor
L	X20	Durham express via Barnes Park, Prospect, Doxford International, (Note: Peak-time journey(s) only.) Houghton-le-Spring, Carrville & Belmont
M	32	Low Moorsley via Royal Hospital, Prospect, Herrington Burn, Houghton-le-Spring & Hetton-le-Hole
N	599	Hebburn via Royal Hospital, Pallion, Hylton Retail Park, Casletown, Nissan Factory & Jarrow Interchange
N	X1	Doxford International Business Park via Prospect & Glanville Road
P	35	Jarrow Interchange via Southwick, Hylton Riverside, Castletown, Town End Farm, Boldon, Fellgate
P	36	Luke's Lane Estate via Southwick, Hylton Riverside, Castletown, Town End Farm, Boldon, Jarrow Interchange & Hebburn
Q	Not in use	
R	700	St Peter's Campus via Wheatsheaf, Seaburn, & Roker
W	Long-distance coach services and excursions	
X	Long-distance coach services and excursions	

- Key:
- Bus station
- National Rail station
- Tyne & Wear Metro station
