= North Shields Transport Hub =

Bus station in North Shields, England

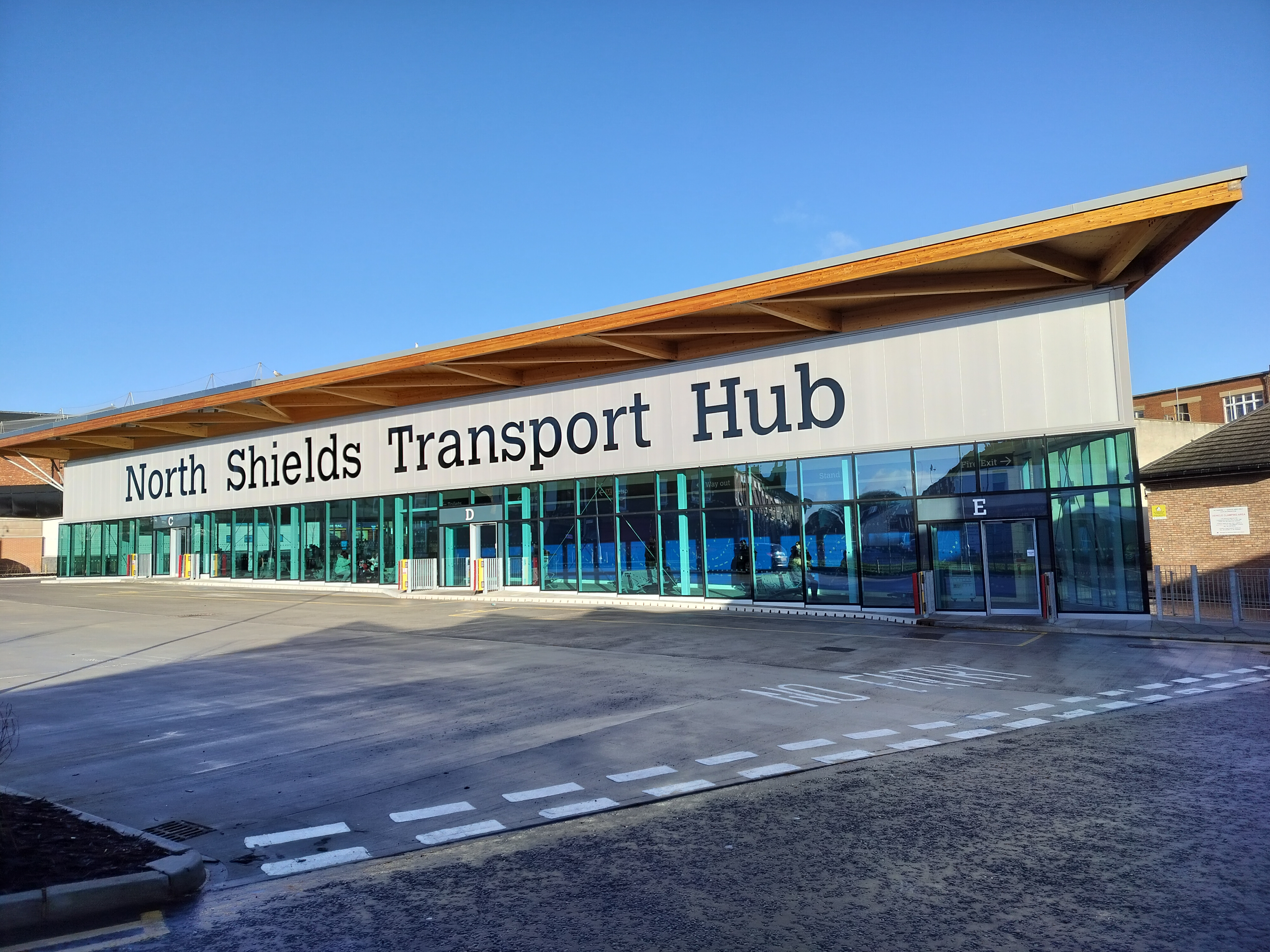

General information
- Location: North Shields; England
- Coordinates: 55°00′30″N 1°26′52″W
- Owner: North Tyneside Council
- Operator: Tyne & Wear Passenger Transport Executive
- Bus stands: 5 (lettered A-E)
- Bus operators: Arriva North East; Go North East; Gateshead Central Buses
- Connections: North Shields

Construction
- Accessible: Step-free access throughout Changing Places toilets

Other information
- Fare zone: Network One: 3; Transfare: Grey
- Website: Nexus

Key dates
- 2023: Opened
Location
- Location within Tyne and Wear

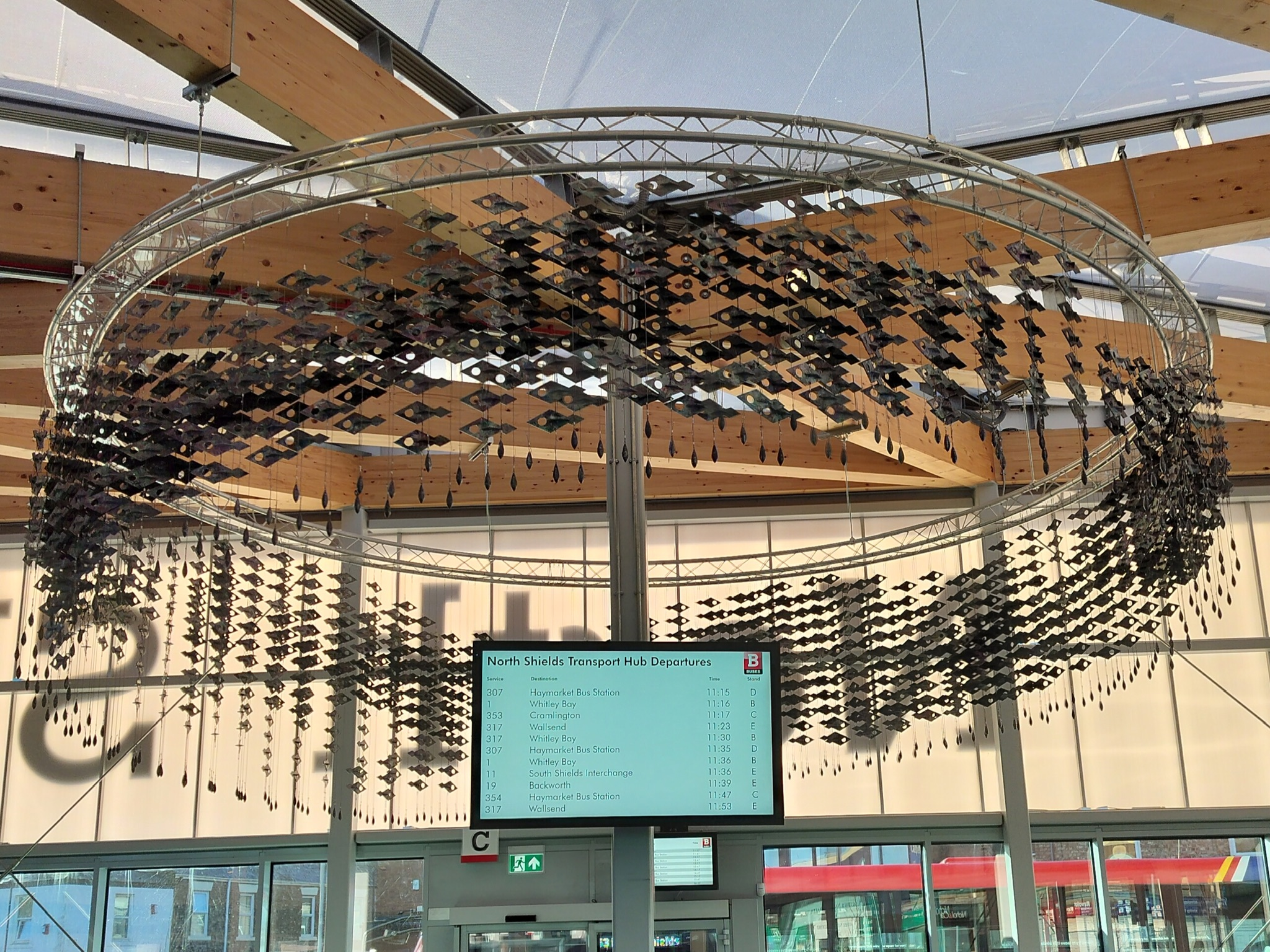
Artwork inside the transport hub, portraying the town's historic fishing industry.

North Shields Transport Hub is a bus station located in North Shields. It is situated next to the North Shields Metro station, on the west side of Bedford Street and The Beacon Centre.

== History ==
The station was opened in 2023 as part of a £12.9m wider regeneration scheme for North Shields. The scheme also redeveloped the square in front of the hub and Metro station into a more welcoming public space. The hub contributes to the council's aim to be net-zero by 2030.

== Stands ==
The station has five bus stands, four for departures (stands B to E), and an additional alighting point (stand A).
