= Durham bus station =

Bus station in County Durham, England

Coordinates: 54.77735°N 1.58202°W

Durham Bus Station
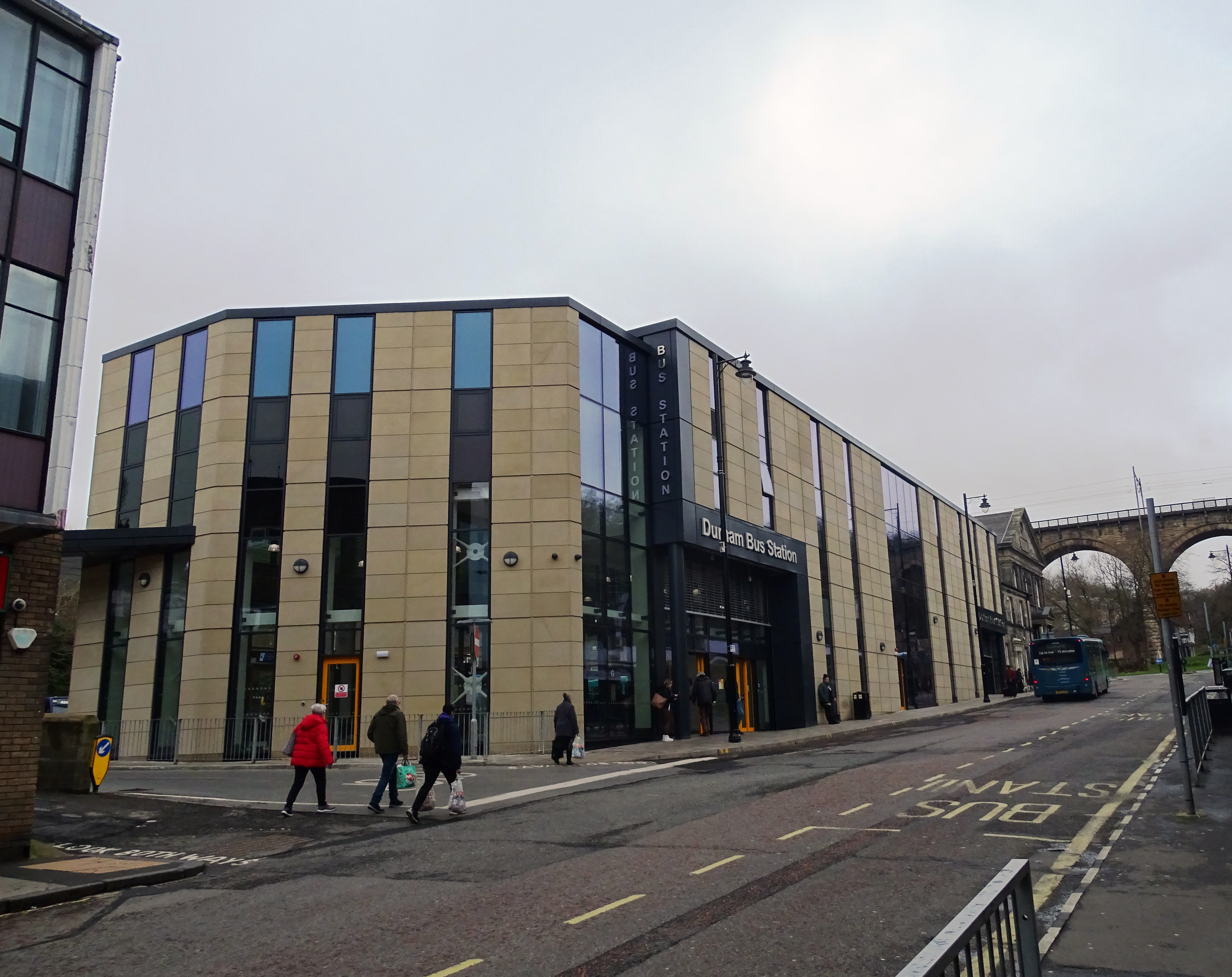
- Durham bus station as viewed from North Road in March 2024

General information
- Location: North Road, Durham
- Operator: Durham County Council
- Bus routes: 26
- Bus stands: 10
- Bus operators: Arriva North East, Go North East, Gateshead Central Taxis, Stagecoach North East
- Connections: Durham railway station (250 metres)

History
- Opened: 1970
- Closed: 15 February 2021
- Rebuilt: 2021-2024
Location

Durham Bus Station serves the city of Durham, in County Durham, England. The bus station is managed by Durham County Council.

The station is situated on North Road, in the city centre. It was closed from February 2021, and was re-built between then & late 2023, before re-opening in January 2024.

== Redevelopment ==
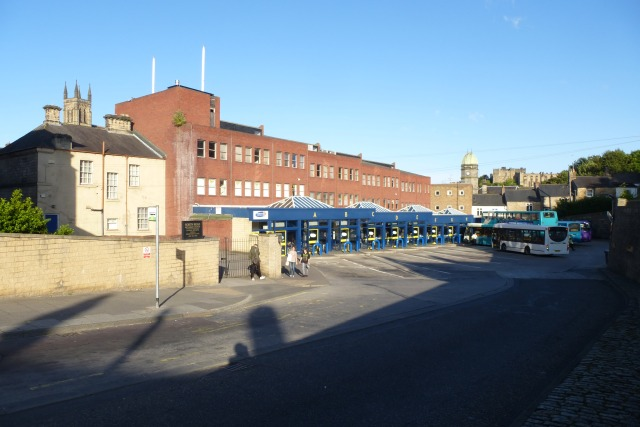
The old (pre-rebuild) bus station as viewed from the rear in 2014

In September 2020, plans to redevelop the bus station were approved. From 15 February 2021, all services were relocated to adjacent streets (North Road & Milburngate) in order to allow the bus station to be demolished. The new bus station was expected to open in late summer 2022. In July 2022, it was announced that the project had been delayed to summer 2023. In August 2023, it was announced that 'significant progress' had been made on the station; with work on drainage, the exterior, & green facilities still being undertaken. It was announced that the bus station was now expected to open in November. Final works & testing were completed towards the end of the year, and the bus station finally opened on the 7th of January 2024.

== Services ==
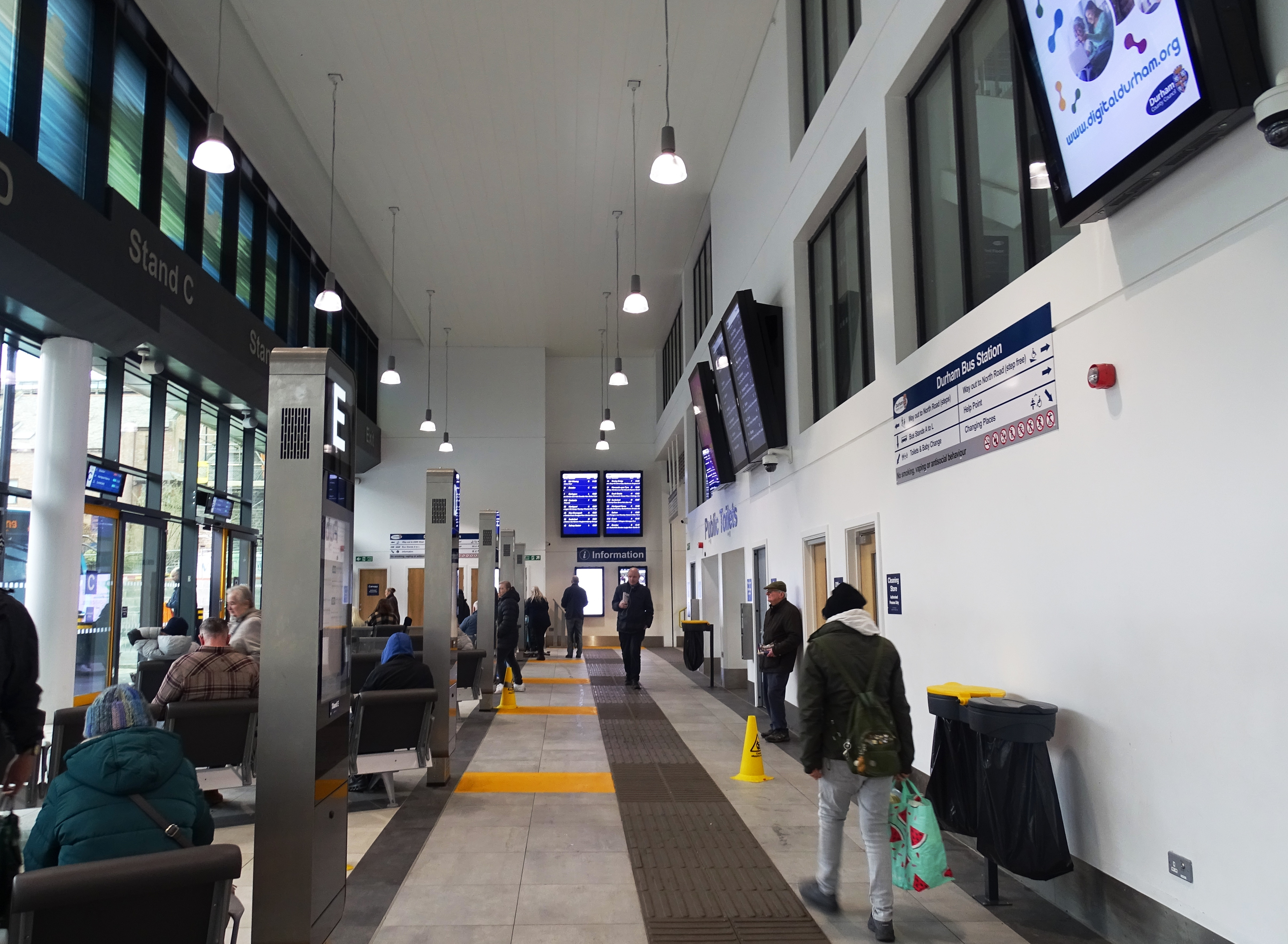
Inside the new station

Before redevelopment, Arriva North East, Go North East & National Express services ran from this bus station. Local buses ran around the city of Durham & surrounding suburbs.

After re-opening in January 2024, local bus services re-commenced operation from the station. The road & pavement where temporary bus stops were installed on North Road are to be re-instated during Spring 2024.

Buses, from the station, run to Durham's surrounding suburbs, as well as to Barnard Castle, Bishop Auckland, Consett, Crook, Hartlepool, Houghton le Spring, Langley Park, Middlesbrough, Newcastle, Peterlee, Seaham, South Shields, Stanley, Sunderland. Bus operators changed their service timetables to accommodate the new stand allocations in preparation for the station's opening.

As of April 2026, the stand allocation is:

Stand	Route	Destination
A	48	New Brancepeth via Neville's Cross, Bearpark & Ushaw Moor
A	X46	Crook (Note: Some journeys (weekday & Saturday) continue to Stanhope.) express via Langley Moor, Meadowfield & Willington
B	43	Esh Winning via Neville's Cross, Broompark & Ushaw Moor
B	49	Brandon via Neville's Cross & Langley Moor
B	49A	Brandon via Neville's Cross & Langley Moor
C	21	Brandon via Neville's Cross & Langley Moor
C	22	Sunderland via Gilesgate, Thornley, Wheatley Hill, Shotton Colliery, Peterlee, Easington, Dalton Park, New Seaham, Ryhope & Grangetown
C	24	Hartlepool via Gilesgate, Sherburn, Shadforth, Hanwell, Shotton Colliery, Peterlee, Horden & Blackhall Colliery
D	20	Sunderland via Gilesgate, Belmont, Carrville, East & West Rainton, Hall Lane Estate, Houghton-le-Spring & East Herrington
D	20A	Sunderland via Gilesgate, Belmont, Carrville, East & West Rainton, Rainton Bridge, Houghton-le-Spring & East Herrington
D	X20	Sunderland (Note: Some journeys (weekday peak) serve Doxford International) express via Gilesgate, Belmont, Carrville, Houghton-le-Spring & East Herrington
D	X62	Peterlee express via Gilesgate, Belmont, Low Pittington, High Pittington, Easington Lane, South Hetton, Easington & Horden
E	14	Langley Park via Framwellgate Moor, Arnison Centre, Nettlesworth, Sacriston & Witton Gilbert
E	20	University Hospital of North Durham
E	65	Framwellgate Moor
E	65	Seaham via Gilesgate, Belmont, Low Pittington, Low Moorsley, Hetton-le-Hole, Murton, Dalton Park & New Seaham
E	204	Sherburn via Gilesgate, Belmont, Low Pittington & High Pittington
E	204A	Sherburn via Gilesgate, Belmont, Low Pittington & High Pittington
F	16	Shotley Bridge Hospital via Framwellgate Moor, Sacriston, Edmondsley, Craghead, South Stanley, Stanley, Annfield Plain, Dipton, Leadgate, Consett & Blackhill
F	16A	Stanley (Note: Evening journeys (weekday & Saturday) continue to Consett.) via Framwellgate Moor, Sacriston, Edmondsley, Craghead & South Moor
F	16B	Consett via Framwellgate Moor, Sacriston, Edmondsley, Craghead, South Stanley, South Moor, Stanley, Annfield Plain, Dipton & Leadgate
F	X5	Castleside express via Witton Gilbert, Lanchester, Delves, Consett & Moorside
F	X15	Castleside express via Witton Gilbert, Lanchester, Leadgate, Consett & Moorside
G	21	Newcastle via Framwellgate Moor, Arnison Centre, (Note: Some early morning & late evening journeys omit Arnison Centre.) Plawsworth, Chester-le-Street, Barley Mow, Birtley, Angel of the North, Harlow Green, Low Fell & Gateshead
G	X12	Newcastle express via Framwellgate Moor, Plawsworth, Chester-le-Street, Birtley, Low Fell & Gateshead
G	X21	Newcastle express via Framwellgate Moor, Plawsworth, Chester-le-Street, Low Fell & Gateshead
H	50	South Shields (Note: Some journeys (Sunday daytime) extend to Marsden.) via Framwellgate Moor, Arnison Centre, Plawsworth, Chester Moor, Waldridge, Chester-le-Street, Rickleton, Harraton, Lambton, Washington Galleries, Concord, IAMP, Boldon Colliery, Whiteleas, Chichester & Westoe
H	X21	West Auckland express via Neville's Cross, Croxdale, Tudhoe, Spennymoor, Bishop Auckland & Tindale Crescent
J	6	Cockfield or Ramshaw (Note: Some journeys (weekday & Saturday) continue to Barnard Castle.) via Croxdale, Tudhoe, Spennymoor, Bishop Auckland, Woodhouse Close, Tindale Crescent, St Helen Auckland, West Auckland & Evenwood
K	56	Tindale Crescent via Shincliffe, Bowburn, Coxhoe, West Cornforth, Stobb Cross, Ferryhill, Coundon & Bishop Auckland
K	58	Hartlepool via Shincliffe, Bowburn, Coxhoe, Kelloe, Quarrington Hill, Cassop, Thornley, Wheatley Hill, Wingate, Station Town & Hart
K	59	Hartlepool via Shincliffe, Bowburn, Coxhoe, Kelloe, Trimdon, Deaf Hill & Hart
K	X12	Middlesbrough express via Shincliffe, Bowburn, Coxhoe, Sedgefield, Hardwick, Stockton-on-Tees & Teesside Park
L	7	Darlington via Neville's Cross, Croxdale, Thinford, Ferryhill, Chilton, Newton Aycliffe & Harrowgate Hill
L	42	Railway Station
