= Galleries Shopping Centre, Washington =

M The Galleries
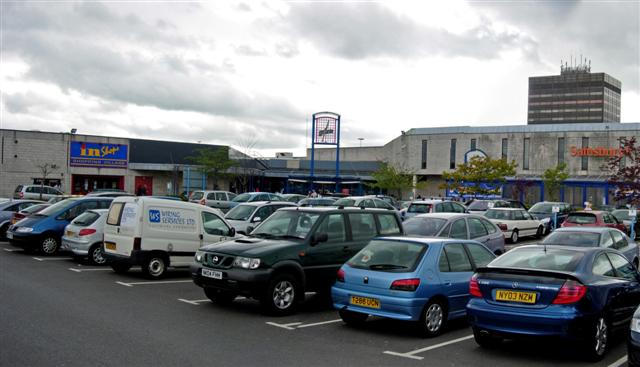
- Galleries Shopping Centre pictured in 2006
- Location: Washington, Tyne and Wear, England
- Coordinates: 54.90053°N 1.53288°W
- Opened: July 1974
- Previous names: Galleries Shopping Centre
- Owner: LCP
- Num. of anchor tenants: 2
- Website: gallerieswashington.co.uk

M The Galleries is a shopping centre located in Washington, City of Sunderland.

== Shops ==
The shopping centre comprises over 200 retail units, including 16 units in the adjacent retail park, with Sainsbury's & Asda as anchor tenants. The shopping centre offers over 2500 free parking spaces and has an on-site bus station, with the adjacent retail park offering over 600 parking spaces.

== History ==
The Galleries shopping centre opened in 1974. Originally the area where Costa coffee is was all open plan without a roof, this to be added years later. The Galleries boasts the UKs first ever flagship “Savacentre” store, now Sainsbury’s.

Since 2009, work at the centre has included erecting new entrances and improving the atrium.

On 8 July 2016, a Changing Places accessible toilet was opened at the centre.

In May 2021, eight electric vehicle charging points were installed near the McDonald's and Greggs car park entrances.

In January 2022 the centre was purchased from M&G Real Estate by LCP.
