= North Shields Metro station =

Tyne and Wear Metro station in North Tyneside

North Shields
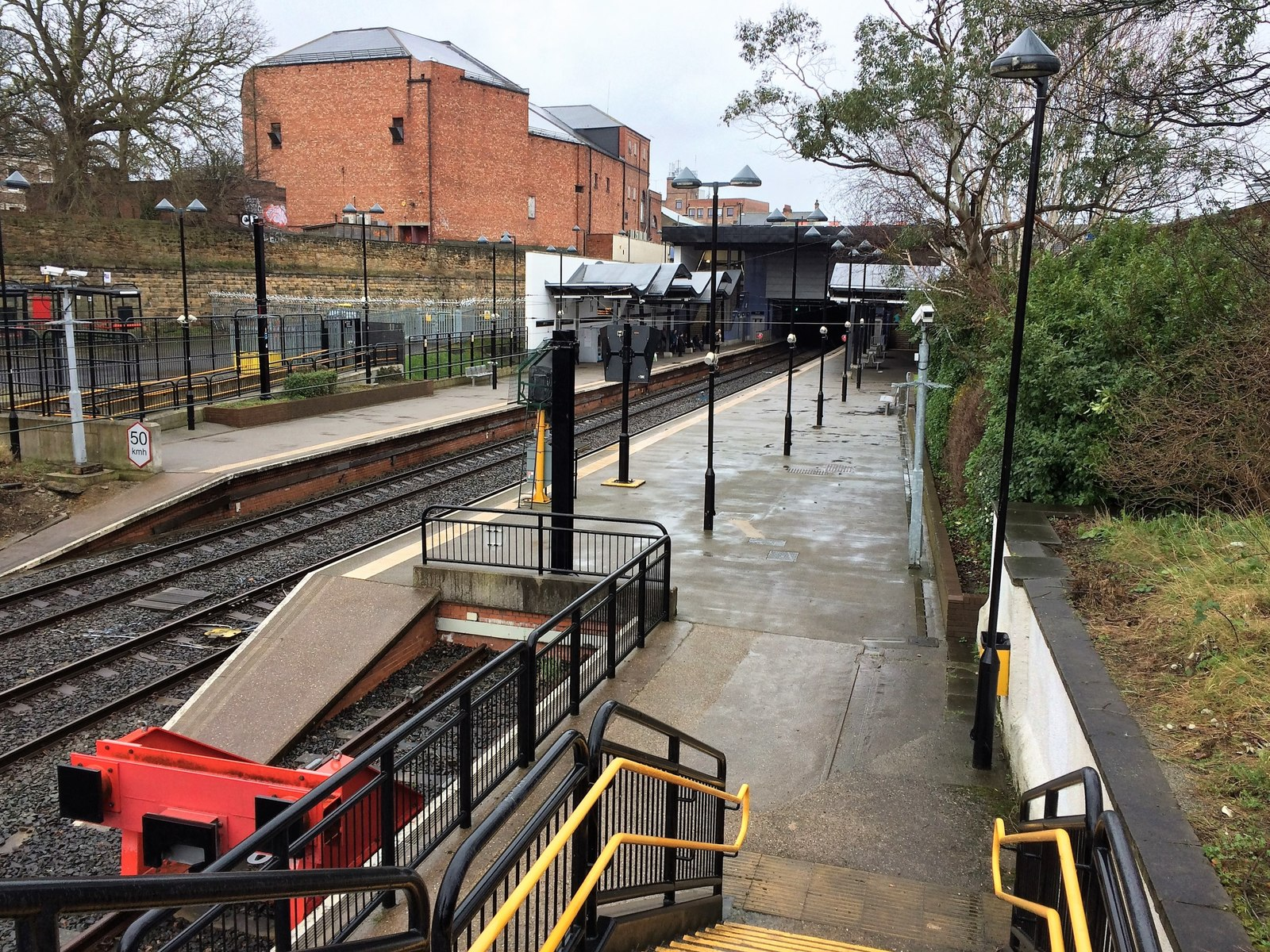

General information
- Location: North Shields, North Tyneside; England
- Coordinates: 55°00′29″N 1°26′56″W
- Grid reference: NZ353683
- System: Tyne and Wear Metro station
- Transit authority: Tyne and Wear PTE
- Platforms: 2 (1 unused)
- Tracks: 2
- Connections: North Shields Transport Hub

Construction
- Cycle facilities: 5 cycle pods
- Accessible: Step-free access to platform

Other information
- Station code: NSH
- Fare zone: C

History
- Original company: Newcastle and North Shields Railway
- Pre-grouping: North Eastern Railway
- Post-grouping: London and North Eastern Railway; British Rail (Eastern Region)

Key dates
- 22 June 1839: Opened as Shields
- 1874: Renamed North Shields
- 11 August 1980: Closed for conversion
- 14 November 1982: Reopened

Passengers
- 2024/25: 1.491 million

Services
Preceding station	Tyne and Wear Metro	Following station
Tynemouth towards South Shields via Whitley Bay	Yellow line	Meadow Well towards St James
Location
- Location within Tyne and Wear
Notes
- Connection with the Shields Ferry by bus 19.

North Shields is a Tyne and Wear Metro station, serving the coastal town of North Shields. It is situated next to the North Shields Transport Hub, on the west side of Bedford Street and The Beacon Centre. It joined the network on 14 November 1982, following the opening of the fourth phase of the network, between Tynemouth and St James via Wallsend.

== History ==
The station, which was named Shields until 1874, was opened on 22 June 1839 by the Newcastle and North Shields Railway. Although originally a terminus station, the line was extended to Tynemouth in 1847, by the digging of a tunnel under North Shields.

The original station buildings were replaced by W. Bell, architect for the North Eastern Railway, between 1889 and 1890, by new booking offices constructed over the platforms. A turret clock with dead-beat pin wheel escapement by Potts of Leeds was installed showing the time of two external illuminated dials about 3 feet 4 inches (1.02 m) in diameter, facing the station entrance, and one inside dial showing into the booking hall, and another in the ticket office.

These buildings survived until the mid-1960s, when they were replaced with a prefabricated structure by British Rail. During this time, the station roof was replaced with individual canopies over each platform.

Following closure for conversion in the early 1980s, the platform-level canopies and ramps from the entrance to the platform were retained, with the 1960s station entrance being replaced by a new structure.

== Regeneration ==
By the end of the 2000s, the station structure was again becoming dated. Nexus drew up plans to replace it with facilities which would provide "a visually striking new gateway to the town centre". The new station was fully completed in September 2012, with changes including passenger lifts, wave-shaped canopies for each platform, and a new black, white and blue colour scheme. The ramps that had formerly provided access to the platforms were replaced with stairs.

Prior to refurbishment, the station had three platforms – consisting of two through platforms, and a bay platform at the south west of the station. The former bay platform, located at the south-west of the station, was used by terminating services from St James. Following the network's extension to Wearside in March 2002, these services were withdrawn.

== Facilities ==
Step-free access is available at all stations across the Tyne and Wear Metro network, with two lifts and ramps providing step-free access to platforms at North Shields. The station is equipped with ticket machines, sheltered waiting area, seating, next train information displays, timetable posters, and an emergency help point on both platforms. Ticket machines are able to accept payment with credit and debit card (including contactless payment), notes and coins. The station is fitted with automatic ticket barriers, which were installed following the station's refurbishment in 2012, as well as smartcard validators, which feature at all stations. The station also housed a Nexus TravelShop, which was located to the right of the station entrance. This has now closed.

There is no dedicated car parking available at the station. A taxi rank is located off Nile Street. There is the provision for cycle parking, with five cycle pods available for use.

== Services ==
As of April 2021, the station is served by up to five trains per hour on weekdays and Saturday, and up to four trains per hour during the evening and on Sunday.
