= Shields Ferry =

Ferry across the River Tyne in England

- ferry/water interchange

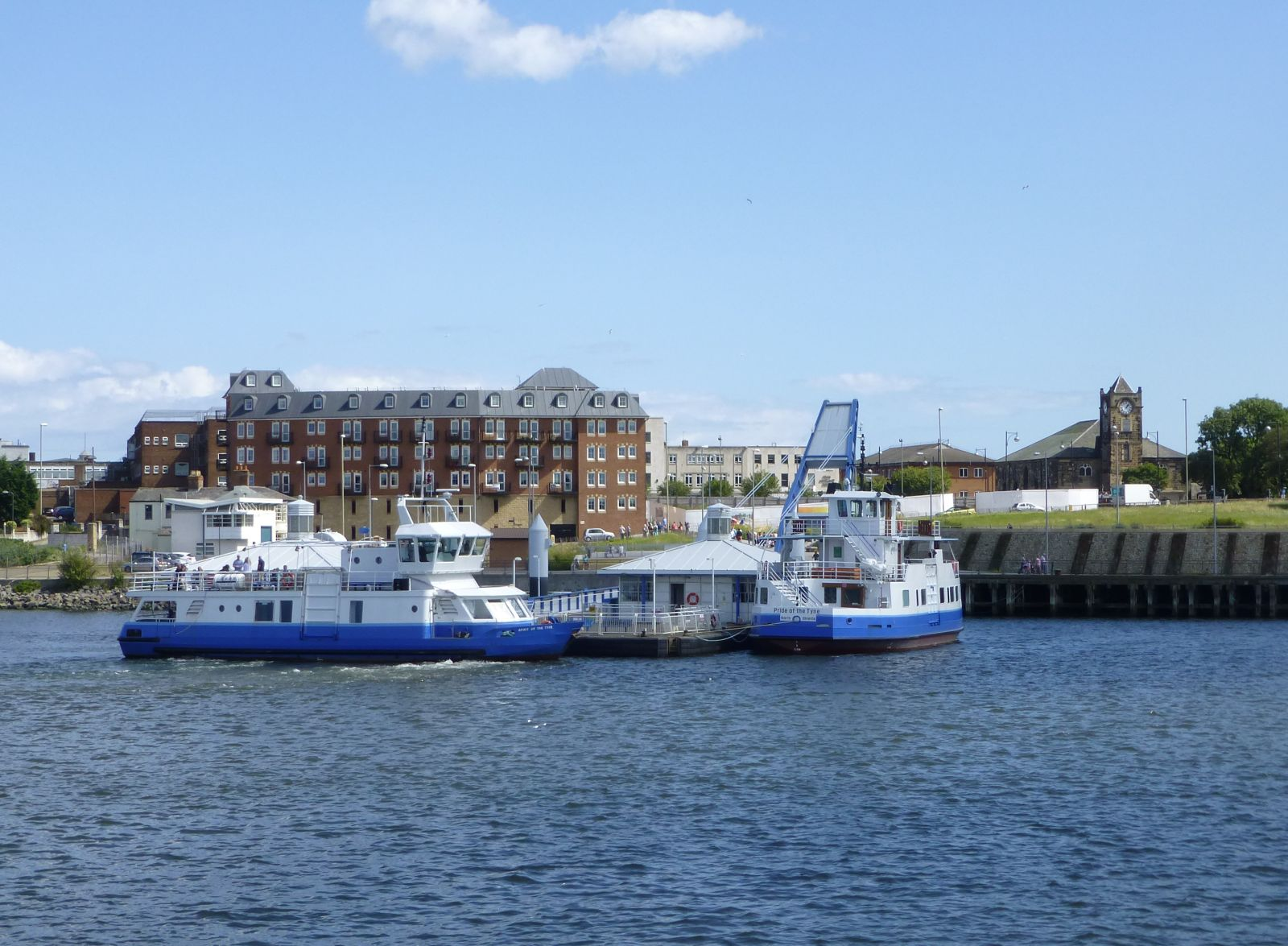
- Locale: Tyne and Wear, England
- Waterway: River Tyne
- Transit type: Pedestrian ferry
- Owner: North East Joint Transport Committee
- Operator: Nexus
- Began operation: 1377; 649 years ago
- Travel time: 7 minutes
- Headway: 30 minutes
- No. of lines: 1
- No. of vessels: 2 (Note: Vessels are named Pride of the Tyne and Spirit of the Tyne.)
- No. of terminals: 2 (Note: Ferry landings are located in North Shields (55°00′14″N 1°26′38″W) and South Shields (54°59′50″N 1°26′28″W).)
- Website: nexus.org.uk/ferry

The Shields Ferry operates across the River Tyne, between North Shields and South Shields in Tyne and Wear, England. The service is operated by the Nexus, the Tyne and Wear PTE. Prior to takeover by the PTE in 1972, it was known as the Market Place Ferry.

== History ==
Records suggest that there have been ferries operating across the River Tyne since 1377. By 1929, there were a total of eleven ferries crossing the River Tyne between Newburn and Tynemouth. Following the opening of the Tyne Tunnel between Jarrow and Howdon in October 1967, ferry traffic saw a significant decline. Today, the Shields Ferry is the only ferry service that remains.

The service provides a viable alternative to travelling by Metro via Newcastle, or by road via the Tyne Tunnel. The ferry can be used by cyclists, and is part of the National Cycle Route 1. All vessels in service are also fully wheelchair-accessible.

The ferry service makes just under 25,000 journeys and carries in the region of 500,000 passengers each year. Two vessels currently operate the service, Pride of the Tyne and Spirit of the Tyne.

In August 2008, the service's first female general manager, Carol Timlin, was appointed. Seven years later, in November 2015, Nicola Peach was appointed as the service's first female crew member. Peach was later promoted to be the company's first female captain in May 2016, after obtaining her boat master's licence.

== Service ==
Usually, only one ferry is in operation at a time, although both are used during peak periods. The service typically operates half-hourly, with a seven minute crossing time.

== Vessels ==
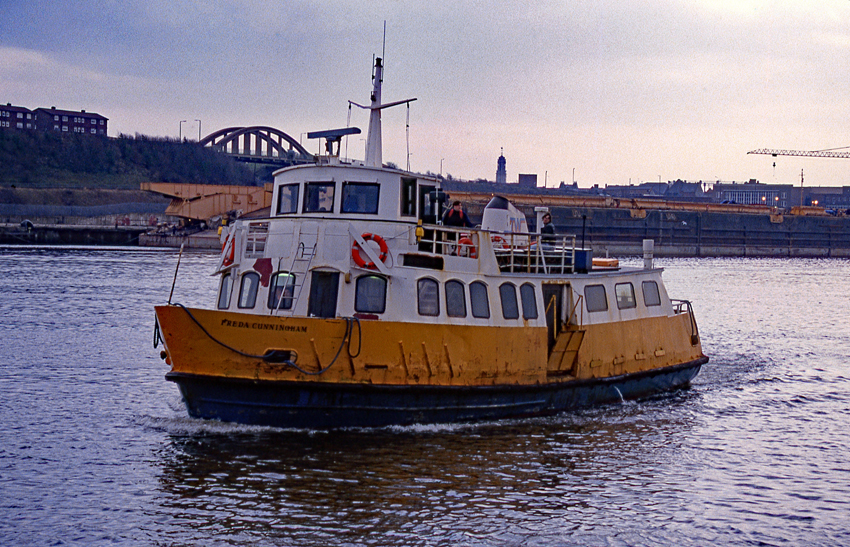
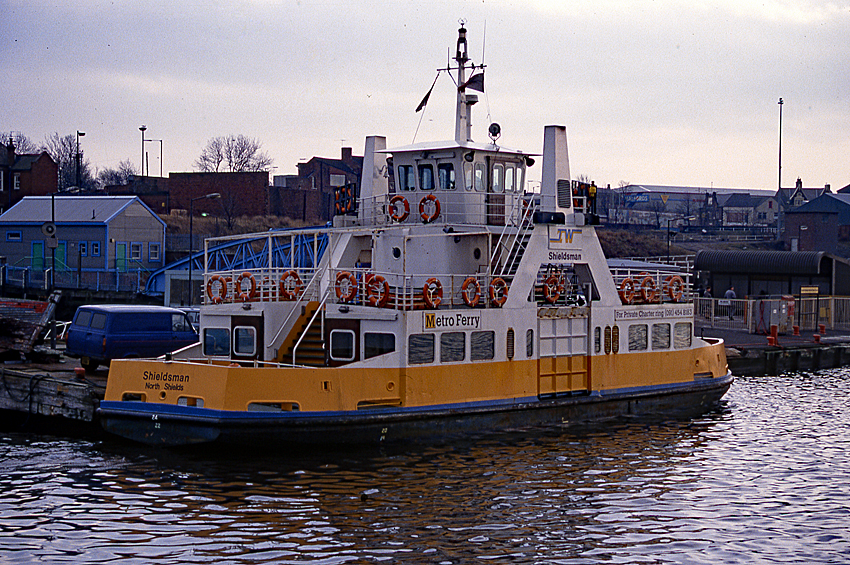
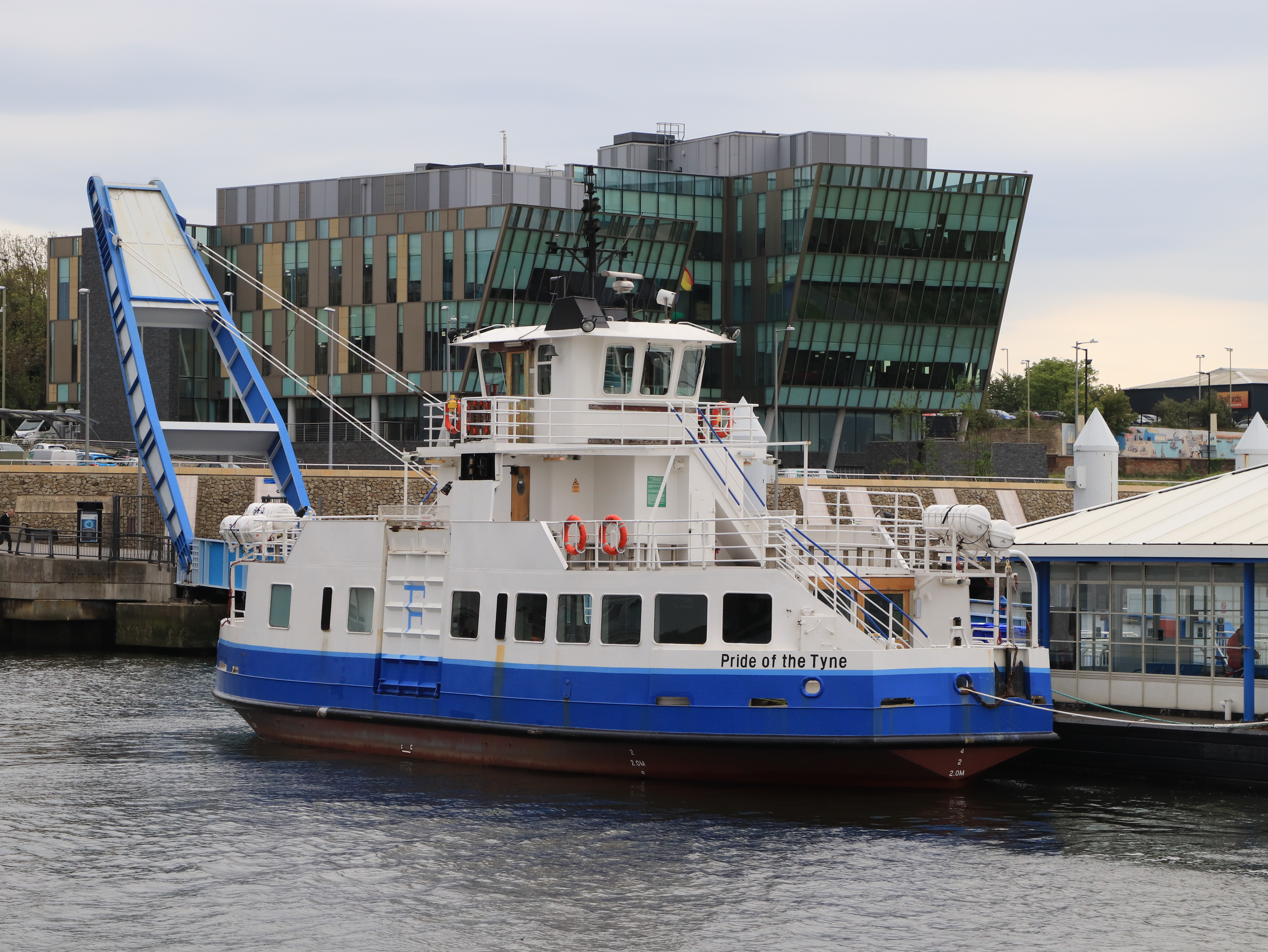
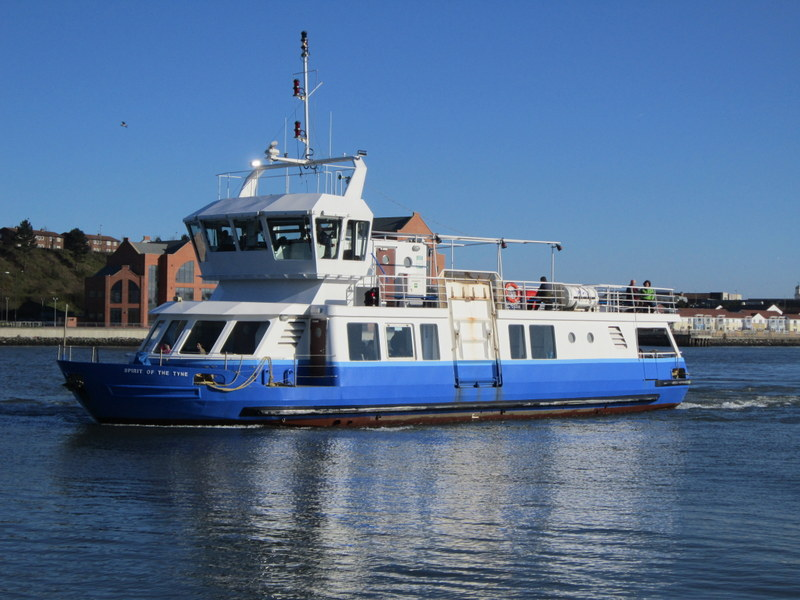
Past and present ferries: Freda Cunningham, Shieldsman, Pride of the Tyne and Spirit of the Tyne.

=== Freda Cunningham (1972–1993) ===
Freda Cunningham was commissioned in 1972, as a replacement for the steamship Northumbrian. It was the first diesel ferry to be commissioned, and had a reputation for unreliability. The ferry's name came from the wife of North East Labour Party leader Andy Cunningham, who was later jailed for corruption. She was also the mother of politician and cabinet minister, Jack Cunningham. The vessel was sold in 1993, when the Pride of The Tyne entered service.

=== Shieldsman (1976–2007) ===
Shieldsman was constructed by Hancock Shipbuilders, Pembroke Dock, and entered service in 1976. The ferry is double-ended and could operate either way, however she typically worked one way and turned around during the crossing. She could carry 350 passengers in public service, or a reduced capacity of 250 on private hire. The Shieldsman was retired early in 2007 to be replaced by the new Spirit of the Tyne, and is now a houseboat on the River Adur in West Sussex.

=== Pride of the Tyne (1993–present) ===
Pride of the Tyne was built by Swan Hunter, Wallsend, at a cost of £1.5 million. It entered service in 1993, and was constructed as a modified version of Shieldsman. The vessel also has a bar, The Admirals Locker, that is available on private hire trips. The vessel was the first river ferry to incorporate all of the new safety features introduced following the Marchioness disaster in August 1989.

=== Spirit of the Tyne (2007–present) ===
Spirit of the Tyne entered service in May 2007, as a replacement for Shieldsman. The ferry is an "off-the-shelf" product and differs greatly from its predecessors. It was built in Harlingen, Netherlands, and fitted out in Portsmouth. The design was adapted from the Gosport ferries: Spirit of Gosport and Spirit of Portsmouth.

== Landings ==
=== North Shields ===
The ferry landing at North Shields was opened in July 2004, providing better accessibility and passenger waiting facilities than its predecessor.

All tickets valid on the Ferry are valid between North Shields Ferry Landing and the town centre by 19, 333 or 317 bus. Alternatively, it is a ten minute walk to the town centre via Borough Road or a 9 minute walk to the nearest 307 bus stop at Waterville Road-Coach Lane.

==== Future developments ====
In November 2018, North Tyneside Council announced plans to consider the feasibility of moving the ferry landing at North Shields. An award of £200,000 was made to North Tyneside Council by the North of Tyne Combined Authority in March 2019, to develop a regeneration master plan for North Shields.

Following storm damage to the ferry landing at North Shields, the Shields Ferry was suspended between 11 November and 21 December 2019 and more seriously in early 2026, whilst repairs were undertaken. During the 2026 extended suspension, replacement bus service 585 operated between the North and South landings.

In August 2020, it was confirmed by the Department for Communities and Local Government that it was allocating £47 million to the North East Local Enterprise Partnership from the Get Building Fund for 18 major projects in the region, to help boost the local economy following the COVID-19 pandemic. In January 2021, a total of £8.8 million funding was secured, with the project being partly financed (£5.5 million) by the fund.

In July 2021, it was announced that due to the time constraints of the project, funding from the government's Getting Building Fund was no longer available. As a result of this, the redevelopment project has been pushed back until at least 2023.

=== South Shields ===
The ferry landing at South Shields was opened in July 1999, with construction commencing once there was sufficient room for redevelopment of the area, following the closure of Harton Low Staithes in July 1993. It served as a replacement for the previous landing which opened in 1898, and provides three berths as well as an indoor waiting room, and offices and break rooms for crew.

Parts of the old ferry landing signage survives in storage at South Shields Museum.

At South Shields Ferry Landing, it is a five minute walk to the South Shields Interchange, which provides connections with bus and Metro.

== Ticketing ==
The Shields Ferry is operated by Nexus, who also operate the Tyne and Wear Metro; ticketing is integrated with the Metro network, but not part of the Pop PAYG network. A range of tickets are valid on the Ferry, including: A+B+C Metro tickets, Transfare tickets, Network One tickets, and Day Rover/Saver tickets. Single or day Ferry tickets can be purchased from the conductor when boarding the ferry.

== Notes ==
Next vehicle crossing upstream	River Tyne	Next vehicle crossing downstream
Tyne Tunnel; A19	Shields Ferry	None; North Sea
Next pedestrian crossing upstream	River Tyne	Next pedestrian crossing downstream
Tyne Pedestrian & Cycle Tunnel	Shields Ferry	None; North Sea
