= Transfare =

Inter-modal ticket

A Transfare is an inter-modal ticket available for a single journey within Tyne & Wear.

== Transport modes ==
=== Rail ===
Transfare tickets are valid on:

- All Tyne & Wear Metro services.
- Northern services between Newcastle and Sunderland via Heworth.
- Northern services between Newcastle and Blaydon via MetroCentre.

A rail journey counts as a single 'leg', even if it involves a change between Metro lines or between Metro and Northern Rail services.

=== Ferry ===
Transfare tickets are valid on the Shields Ferry across the River Tyne.

Use of bus service 333 between the North Shields ferry landing and North Shields Interchange counts as part of the ferry 'leg'

=== Bus ===
Transfare tickets are issued and accepted by most bus companies operating services in Tyne & Wear; including Arriva North East, Go North East and Stagecoach North East.

== Bus/Bus Interchange ==
Interchange between buses is permitted in one of three circumstances.

- Changing in Washington.
- Changing in Sunderland to or from an express bus service.
- Changing in Gateshead, Blaydon or Heworth when travelling to or from the MetroCentre.

== General Regulations ==
- The final segment of the journey must start within 90 minutes of the ticket being issued.
- The complete journey must be entirely within Tyne and Wear.
