= List of Tyne and Wear Metro stations =

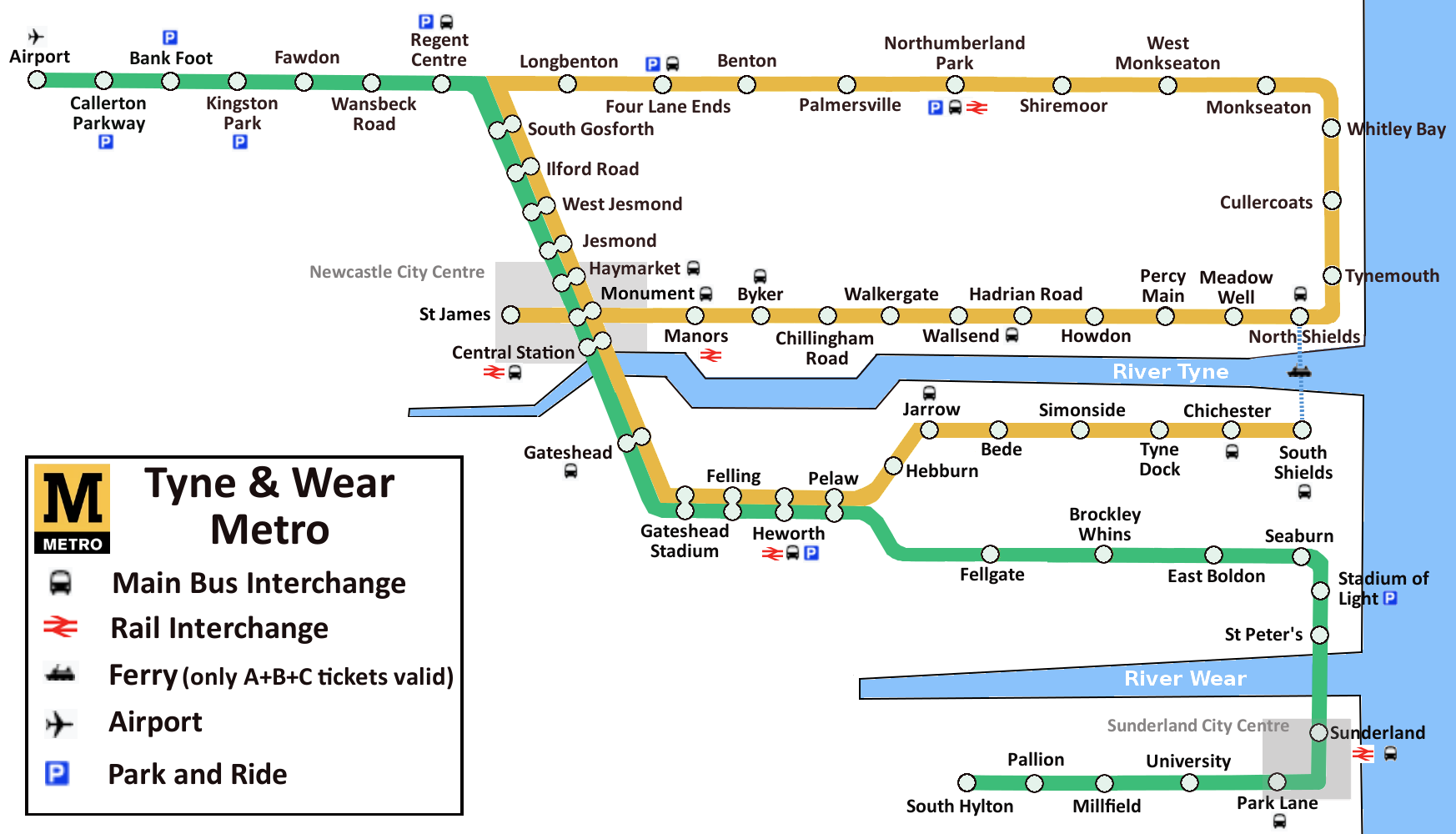
A schematic map of the Tyne and Wear Metro system

The following is a list of Tyne and Wear Metro stations.

== Purpose-built stations ==
The following stations were built specifically for the Tyne and Wear Metro system.

| Station | Code | Opened | Line |
|---|---|---|---|
| Airport | APT | 17 Nov 1991 | Green line |
| Bank Foot | BFT | 10 May 1981 | Green line |
| Bede | BDE | 24 Mar 1984 | Yellow line |
| Byker | BYK | 14 Nov 1982 | Yellow line |
| Callerton Parkway | CAL | 17 Nov 1991 | Green line |
| Central Station | CEN | 15 Nov 1981 | Yellow line, Green line |
| Chichester | CHI | 24 Mar 1984 | Yellow line |
| Chillingham Road | CRD | 14 Nov 1982 | Yellow line |
| Fawdon | FAW | 10 May 1981 | Green line |
| Fellgate | FEG | 31 Mar 2002 | Green line |
| Four Lane Ends | FLE | 11 Aug 1980 | Yellow line |
| Gateshead | GHD | 15 Nov 1981 | Yellow line, Green line |
| Gateshead Stadium (Note: Called Old Fold during the planning stages.) | GST | 15 Nov 1981 | Green line, Yellow line |
| Hadrian Road | HDR | 14 Nov 1982 | Yellow line |
| Haymarket | HAY | 11 Aug 1980 | Yellow line, Green line |
| Heworth | HTH | 15 Nov 1981 | Green line, Yellow line |
| Ilford Road | ILF | 11 Aug 1980 | Yellow line, Green line |
| Jesmond | JES | 11 Aug 1980 | Yellow line, Green line |
| Kingston Park | KSP | 15 Sep 1985 | Green line |
| Manors | MAN | 14 Nov 1982 | Yellow line |
| Meadow Well (Note: Opened as Smiths Park, renamed as Meadow Well on 10 October 1994.) | MWL | 14 Nov 1982 | Yellow line |
| Millfield | MLF | 31 Mar 2002 | Green line |
| Monument | MMT | 15 Nov 1981 | Yellow line, Green line |
| Northumberland Park | NPK | 11 Dec 2005 | Yellow line |
| Pallion | PAL | 31 Mar 2002 | Green line |
| Palmersville Metro station | PMV | 19 Mar 1986 | Yellow line |
| Park Lane | PLI | 28 Apr 2002 | Green line |
| Pelaw (Note: A previous station named Pelaw opened on 18 November 1896, but was located north of the Metro station site.) | PLW | 16 Sep 1985 | Green line, Yellow line |
| Regent Centre | RGC | 10 May 1981 | Green line |
| Simonside | SMD | 17 Mar 2008 | Yellow line |
| St James | SJM | 14 Nov 1982 | Yellow line |
| St Peter's | STZ | 16 Apr 2001 | Green line |
| Shiremoor | SMR | 11 Aug 1980 | Yellow line |
| South Hylton | SHL | 31 Mar 2002 | Green line |
| South Shields | SSS | 23 Mar 1984 | Yellow line |
| Stadium of Light | SFC | 31 Mar 2002 | Green line |
| Tyne Dock | TDK | 24 Mar 1984 | Yellow line |
| University | UNI | 31 Mar 2002 | Green line |
| Wansbeck Road | WBR | 10 May 1981 | Green line |

== Converted stations ==
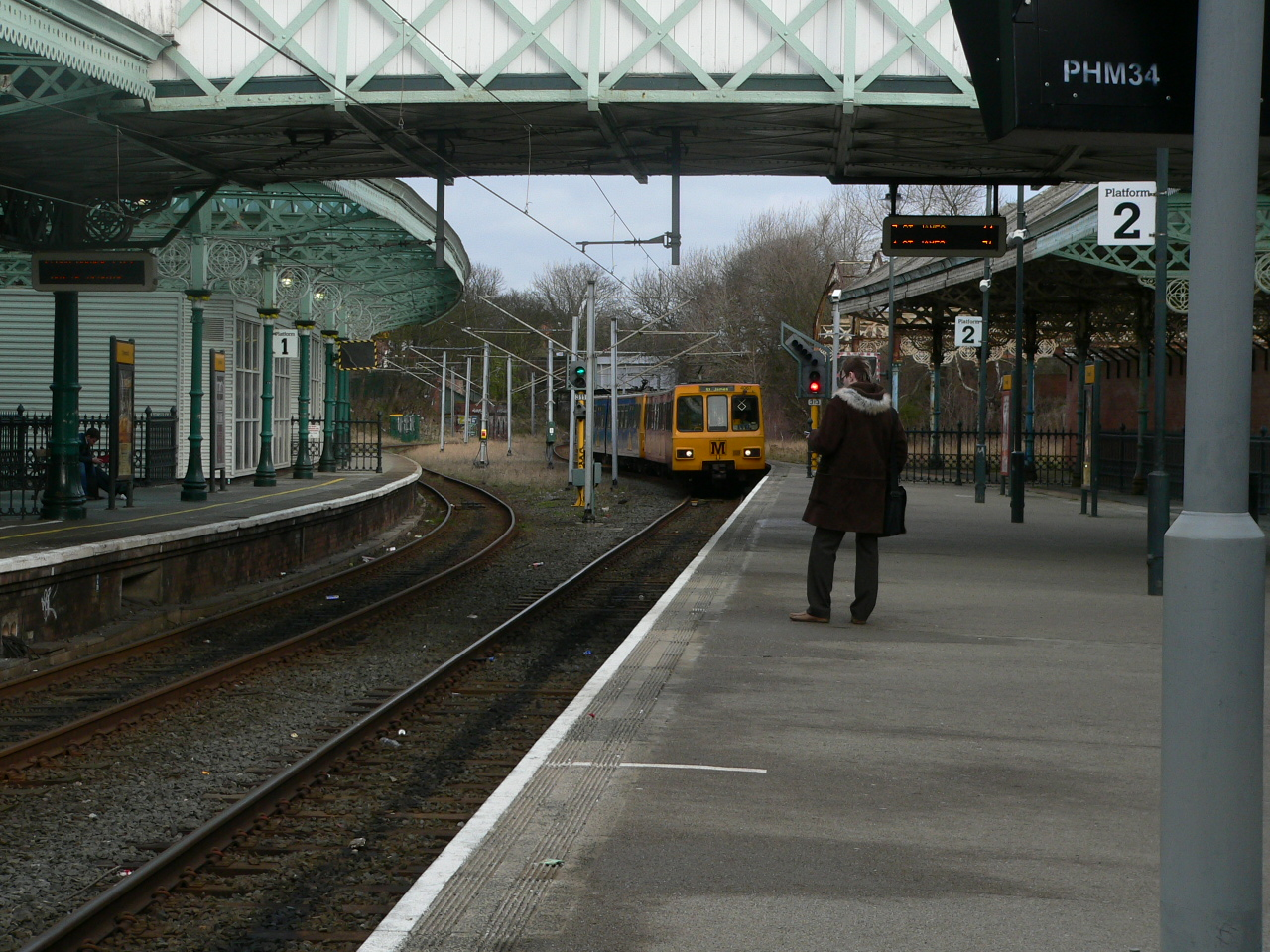
A metro train for St James arrives at Tynemouth station

These stations were built prior to the Metro system, but have since been converted or re-built for Metro use. All except Sunderland now serve Metro trains only.

This list does not include Fawdon, Bank Foot, and Regent Centre, which are located on the sites of the former Coxlodge, Kenton, and West Gosforth stations on what was once the Ponteland Railway, but which closed to passenger traffic in 1929; Pelaw, which was added to the Metro in 1985, and which is sited to the south of the former station of that name; Northumberland Park, opened 2005, built on the approximate site of the previous Backworth station, closed in 1979; and Palmersville, added in 1985, close to the short-lived Benton Square station (which was open 1909-1915). In addition, Jesmond, Manors, and Central Station are all purpose-built underground stations that were built near to, and share names with, previous suburban stations, and South Shields is built upon a bridge closer to the town centre than the previous mainline station of that name, although that Metro station was moved to the new South Shields Interchange, opened in 2019, to the west of the former station that was open 1984-2019.

| Station | Code | Opened | Metro since | Line(s) |
|---|---|---|---|---|
| Benton | BTN | 1 Mar 1871 | 11 Aug 1980 | Yellow line |
| Brockley Whins (Note: Named Boldon Colliery, 1925–1991.) | BNR | 31 Mar 2002 | 31 March 2002 | Green line |
| Cullercoats | CUL | 3 Jul 1882 | 11 Aug 1980 | Yellow line |
| East Boldon | EBL | 31 Mar 2002 | 31 Mar 2002 | Green line |
| Felling | FEL | 18 Nov 1896 | 15 Nov 1981 | Yellow line, Green line |
| Hebburn | HEB | 24 Mar 1984 | 24 Mar 1984 | Yellow line |
| Howdon | HOW | 14 Nov 1982 | 14 Nov 1982 | Yellow line |
| Jarrow | JAR | 1 Mar 1872 | 24 Mar 1984 | Yellow line |
| Longbenton | LBN | 14 Jul 1947 | 11 Aug 1980 | Yellow line |
| Monkseaton | MSN | 25 Jul 1915 | 11 Aug 1980 | Yellow line |
| North Shields | NSH | 14 Nov 1982 | 14 Nov 1982 | Yellow line |
| Percy Main | PCM | 14 Nov 1982 | 14 Nov 1982 | Yellow line |
| Seaburn | SBN | 3 May 1937 | 31 Mar 2002 | Green line |
| South Gosforth (Note: The old station buildings were demolished in the late 1970s and replaced by the Metro Control Centre.) | SGF | 27 Jun 1864 | 11 August 1980 | Green line, Yellow line |
| Sunderland station | SUN | 4 Aug 1879 | 31 Mar 2002 | Green line |
| Tynemouth station | TYN | 7 Jul 1882 | 11 Aug 1980 | Yellow line |
| Walkergate | WKG | 14 Nov 1982 | 14 Nov 1982 | Yellow line |
| Wallsend | WSD | 14 Nov 1982 | 14 Nov 1982 | Yellow line |
| West Jesmond | WJS | 1 Dec 1900 | 11 Aug 1980 | Yellow line, Green line |
| West Monkseaton | WMN | 20 Mar 1933 | 11 Aug 1980 | Yellow line |
| Whitley Bay | WTL | 3 Jul 1882 | 11 Aug 1980 | Yellow line |

== Proposed stations ==
There have been numerous suggestions for infill stations on the Metro since it opened, and five of these, Pelaw, Kingston Park, Palmersville, Northumberland Park and Simonside have been built and attract high patronage. Other plans that have been abandoned or are yet to be built include:

- Beaconsfield (between Tynemouth and Cullercoats): Proposed in the 1980s, but planned area development was abandoned.
- Dorrington Road (west of Fawdon): the proposed station was sited where the Newcastle bypass road was ultimately built.
- High Lane Row (between Hebburn and Jarrow): Construction to go ahead if the current single track is dualled. Both track dualling and this station are included in the latest proposals to central government.
- Pallion Bridge (between South Hylton and Pallion): Proposed to be built when Ford Estate and the former Grove Cranes site are redeveloped for business and residential use, and the New Wear Bridge is completed, opening up new areas of patronage in the Castletown, Ford Estate, Hylton Riverside and Alexandra Park areas.
- Stotts Road (between Walkergate and Wallsend): Proposed in the mid-1980s.
- Victoria Road West (between Pelaw and Hebburn): Mooted by South Tyneside government officials in 2008 to service South Tyneside college, which has since been closed and demolished. Currently, this is the longest stretch of track between two stations.

== See also ==
- Category:Tyne and Wear Metro Green line stations ( 31 )
- Category:Tyne and Wear Metro Yellow line stations ( 41 )
