= Bede Metro station =

Tyne and Wear Metro station

Bede
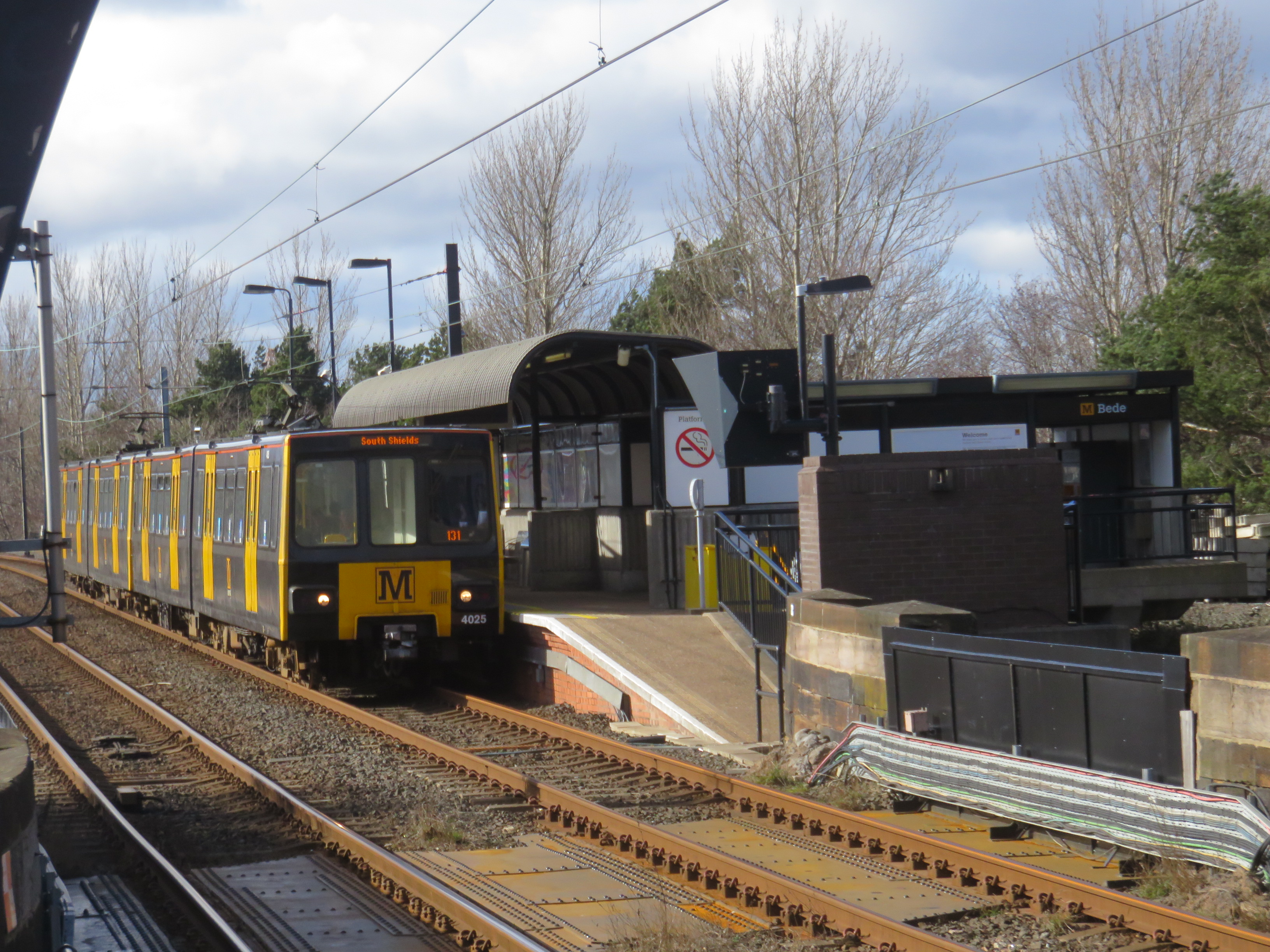

General information
- Location: Jarrow, South Tyneside; England
- Coordinates: 54°58′27″N 1°27′56″W
- Grid reference: NZ343645
- System: Tyne and Wear Metro station
- Transit authority: Tyne and Wear PTE
- Platforms: 2
- Tracks: 2

Construction
- Cycle facilities: 2 cycle pods
- Accessible: Step-free access to platform

Other information
- Station code: BDE
- Fare zone: B and C

History
- Original company: Tyne and Wear Metro

Key dates
- 24 March 1984: Opened

Passengers
- 2024/25: 0.322 million

Services
Preceding station	Tyne and Wear Metro	Following station
Simonside towards South Shields	Yellow line	Jarrow towards St James via Whitley Bay
Location
- Location within Tyne and Wear

Bede is a Tyne and Wear Metro station, serving the town of Jarrow, South Tyneside in Tyne and Wear, England. It joined the network on 24 March 1984, following the opening of the fifth phase of the network, between Heworth and South Shields.

The station is named after the Venerable Bede – a monk who established the nearby St. Paul's Monastery during the seventh century.

== History ==
Unlike nearby Hebburn and Jarrow, which were converted from former British Rail stations, Bede was purpose-built for Tyne and Wear Metro network in the early 1980s.

Bede serves an area consisting mainly of industrial estates, with the station located adjacent to the J. Barbour and Sons clothing factory. The station also serves the 1st Cloud Arena, the home ground of South Shields F.C.

== Future developments ==
During the 2020 Budget, the UK Government announced an investment of £95 million towards the £103 million Metro Flow project, which aims to increase capacity by up to 30,000 passenger journeys per day, and improve reliability on the branch line between Pelaw and South Shields. From September 2022, the project will include upgrading and electrifying a currently freight-only line, doubling three sections of single track between Pelaw and Bede, and purchasing four extra trains in addition to the 42 which have already been funded.

== Facilities ==
The station has two platforms (situated at either side of a small bridge over Monksway), both of which have ticket machines (which accept cash, card and contactless payment), smartcard validators, sheltered waiting area, seating, next train audio and visual displays, timetable and information posters and an emergency help point. There is step-free access to both platforms by ramp, with platforms also accessed by stairs. There is cycle storage at the station, with two cycle pods.

== Services ==
As of April 2021, the station is served by up to five trains per hour on weekdays and Saturday, and up to four trains per hour during the evening and on Sunday between South Shields and St James via Whitley Bay. (Note: Prior to 12 December 2005, services operated between South Shields and Newcastle Airport.)

== Accidents and incidents ==
- On 17 December 1915, at nearby St Bede's Junction, 18 people were killed and a further 81 injured, when a passenger train crashed into a banking engine in the early morning fog.
