= South Shields railway station =

Former railway station in Tyne & Wear, England

Coordinates: 54.9996°N 1.4344°W

South Shields
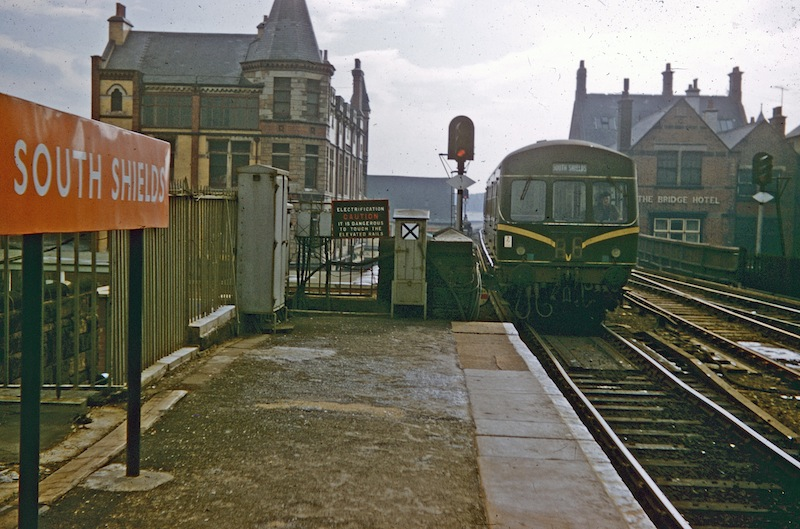
- The station in 1963, just after de-electrification

General information
- Location: South Shields, South Tyneside; England
- Platforms: 2

Other information
- Status: Disused

History
- Original company: North Eastern Railway
- Pre-grouping: North Eastern Railway
- Post-grouping: London and North Eastern Railway, British Rail (North Eastern), British Rail (Eastern)

Key dates
- 1879: Opened
- 1938: Route electrified by LNER
- 1963: Route de-electrified by British Rail
- 1 June 1981: Station closed for conversion to Metro operation
- 1998: Demolished
Location

South Shields railway station served the town of South Shields, in Tyne and Wear, England. The station was located on Mile End Road in the town centre. It was opened by the North Eastern Railway in 1879, as the terminus of their newly extended Newcastle and South Shields Railway branch from Pelaw, via Hebburn. It had two platforms and an ornate overall roof.

== History ==
The town had been rail-served by some years prior to this; the Stanhope and Tyne Railway had opened their route from Washington back in 1834, whilst the Brandling Junction Railway followed with a branch from Brockley Whins five years later. However, both these companies (and the S&T's successor the Pontop and South Shields Railway) had though been purely concerned with mineral traffic and passenger provision was limited. The new route was built to carry passengers from the outset as well as coal & iron ore to/from Tyne Dock and had regular services to both Newcastle Central via Gateshead and to Sunderland, these running via the old BJR route via Tyne Dock and East Boldon.

The train shed was covered by an overall cast iron roof of two spans partially glazed. Cast iron columns support the roof.

The 1923 Grouping saw the station pass from the North Eastern Railway into the control of the London and North Eastern Railway. Services on both routes remained well used and, in 1938, the line from Newcastle was electrified on the 660 V DC system as an extension of the existing North Tyneside suburban network.

Nationalisation in 1948 saw the station become part of British Railways' North Eastern Region, but over the next few years services began to decline; those to Whitburn Colliery ended in November 1953, whilst the direct Sunderland trains fell victim to the Beeching Axe in May 1965; passengers thereafter had to change at Pelaw.

The Newcastle line was also converted to diesel multiple unit operation in 1963, with BR stating that it was cheaper to remove the third rail than renew the electrical equipment on the route. Though it survived the Beeching cuts, the station and route had become increasingly run down by the 1970s and so it was a logical choice to be included in the planned Tyne & Wear Metro network.

The station was eventually closed on 1 June 1981, when the line was temporarily shut down for conversion to Metro operation. It was replaced by the new South Shields Metro station, a short distance to the south, when the line reopened in 1984. The station building survived as an entrance to the Metro system until the 1990s, when it was demolished.

| Preceding station | Historical railways | Following station |
|---|---|---|
| High Shields; Line and station closed | London and North Eastern Railway; Tyneside Electrics (South Shields line) | Terminus |
| High Shields; Line and station closed | London and North Eastern Railway; Sunderland-South Shields | Terminus |

== The site today ==
Today, a Shopmobility centre stands on the site of the original station building. The new building was built to a similar style as the station it replaced. The platforms behind have been removed, but the rest of the site is still used by Nexus as carriage and engineers' sidings.

On 4 August 2019, the new South Shields Interchange opened; it also includes a bus terminal. The same tracks are used, but the platform was relocated.
