= St Bedes Junction rail crash =

1915 railway accident in England

Details
- Date: 17 December 1915; 07:20
- Location: St Bedes Junction near Jarrow
- Coordinates: 54.9742°N 1.4646°W
- Country: England
- Line: North Eastern Railway
- Cause: Signalman's error

Statistics
- Trains: 3
- Deaths: 19
- Injured: 81-82

The accident at St Bedes Junction was one of several serious accidents in 1915. It featured a double collision and fire fuelled by gas, characteristics shared by a much worse accident that year at Quintinshill. There were also similarities in that a signalman was unaware of the presence of a train near his signal box and rules were not observed. The accident is sometimes referred to as the Jarrow railway disaster as there was no station at Bede and Jarrow was then the nearest place of importance.

== Accident Location ==
St. Bedes Junction lay opposite the up (westbound) platform at Bede Metro Station. When the Tyne and Wear Metro was created, it used the former up line through Jarrow and the new station site at Bede. The former down (eastbound) line was used for freight access to sidings and became known as the Jarrow branch. The Metro along this section was single track with passing loops. St. Bedes Junction thus became a point of divergence rather than a junction but the line to Tyne Dock Bottom was retained to serve the Simonside Wagon Works. The wagon works remained open as late as 1987 but has subsequently closed and the track lifted as far back as the siding serving Jarrow Shell (UK). The Metro may already have used the redundant track bed to extend its double track section. The junction coordinates are 54.9742°N, 1.4646°W.

Another point of divergence, once a junction, lies between Jarrow and Bede Metro stations and this serves Jarrow Shell (UK). It is easily mistaken for the site of St. Bedes Junction. Its coordinates are 54.9773°N, 1.4824°W. Jarrow and Bede Metro stations lie on what was the North Eastern Railway line between Newcastle upon Tyne and South Shields. Jarrow was rebuilt for Metro operation and Bede was a completely new station. Both have two platforms, those at Bede are staggered and placed either side of a rail over road bridge. The Jarrow branch passes to the north of the platforms at Jarrow and is not served by them. A similar arrangement existed at Bede until the branch was lifted.

In 1981, the Railway Magazine had a map showing the full extent of the planned Tyne and Wear Metro system. This map includes the planned track layout through Jarrow. In particular, you can see the separation of freight tracks from those of the Metro, the single-track sections and passing loops at stations. The branch to Tyne Dock Bottom is shown commencing at a new station, Bede, and a short branch near Jarrow serves Jarrow Shell (UK).

Further changes are due in the area as NEXUS, the operator of the Tyne and Wear Metro has launched Metro Flow, a project to reinstate dual tracking on the remaining sections of single line near Jarrow. This scheme will see dual use with both Metro and freight trains using the same tracks. The formation of the Jarrow branch will provide the track bed for the additional running line. This scheme has the potential to introduce additional junctions to the Metro.

The scene around St. Bedes Junction and Tyne Dock is much changed today with new roads and industrial buildings nearby. Sidings once connected to the railway have been removed as the land was repurposed. In 2022, it is still possible to make out parts of the now disused and overgrown branch near Bede station as it curves towards the dock. A disused rail over road bridge, once used for the Jarrow branch, remains in place just north of the bridge carrying the Metro tracks.

== The Accident ==
From St. Bedes junction, a mineral line descended on a gradient of 1 in 100 to Tyne Dock Bottom. On 17 December 1915, in the early morning in fog, a goods train ran out onto the main line past St Bedes signal box having been banked in the rear up the incline by a six-coupled tank engine. The banking engine, uncoupled, dropped away from the goods train and came to a stand on the up main line, but was not seen by the signalman. Shortly afterwards, the signalman accepted the 07:05 passenger train from South Shields to Newcastle on the up line and the 06:58 empty stock train from Hebburn to South Shields which was travelling at about 10 mph (16 km/h). The passenger train collided with the rear of the banking engine at 30 mph (48 km/h), telescoping the two leading coaches. Almost immediately the empty stock train collided with the wreckage, killing the fireman. A subsequent enquiry suggested that 18 people lost their lives instantaneously during the collision. The gas-lit passenger coaches were then consumed by fire. 81 or 82 people were injured.

== Causes ==
The signalman's failure to notice that the goods train had been banked was the primary cause of the disaster but also at fault was the driver of the banking engine who stood for 17 minutes before obeying Rule 55 and sending his fireman back to the signal box, by which time it was too late to avert the accident. The continued use of gas-lighting also contributed to the severity of the accident and a circular was sent to all railway companies stressing the importance of replacing gas with electric lighting. It was some years before this was put into practice, however.
