= Jarrow Metro station =

Tyne and Wear Metro station in South Tyneside

Jarrow
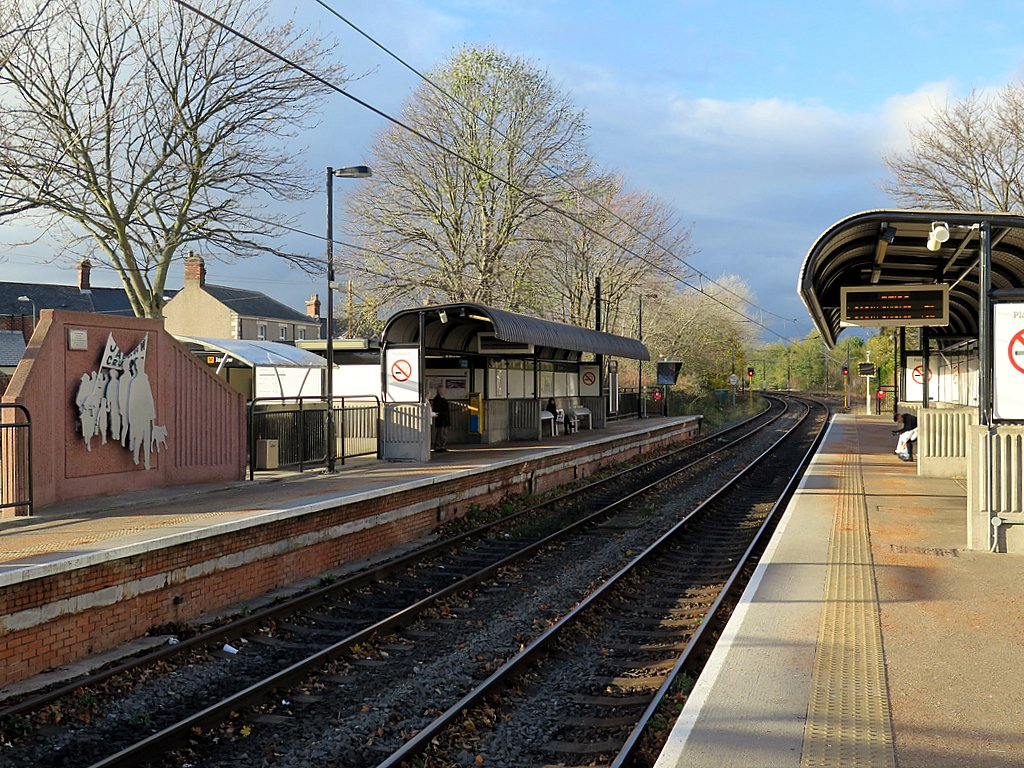

General information
- Location: Jarrow, South Tyneside; England
- Coordinates: 54°58′47″N 1°29′37″W
- Grid reference: NZ325651
- System: Tyne and Wear Metro station
- Transit authority: Tyne and Wear PTE
- Platforms: 2
- Tracks: 2
- Bus stands: 5

Construction
- Parking: 23 spaces
- Cycle facilities: 5 cycle lockers; 6 cycle pods
- Accessible: Step-free access to platform

Other information
- Station code: JAR
- Fare zone: B

History
- Original company: North Eastern Railway
- Pre-grouping: North Eastern Railway
- Post-grouping: London and North Eastern Railway; British Rail (Eastern Region)

Key dates
- 1 March 1872: Opened
- 1 June 1981: Closed for conversion
- 24 March 1984: Reopened

Passengers
- 2024/25: 0.962 million

Services
Preceding station	Tyne and Wear Metro	Following station
Bede towards South Shields	Yellow line	Hebburn towards St James via Whitley Bay
Location
- Location within Tyne and Wear

Jarrow is a Tyne and Wear Metro station, serving the town of Jarrow, South Tyneside in Tyne and Wear, England. It joined the network on 24 March 1984, following the opening of the fifth phase of the network, between Heworth and South Shields.

== History ==
The station was opened by the North Eastern Railway on 1 March 1872.

In 1935, the London North Eastern Railway unveiled plans to electrify the South Shields branch, with the branch joining the Tyneside Electrics network of services in 1938.

Owing to falling passenger numbers during the 1960s, as well as rising costs, and the need to renew life expired infrastructure and rolling stock, the Tyneside Electrics network was de-electrified and converted to diesel multiple unit operation in 1963.

During the early 1970s, the poor local transport system was identified as one of the main factors holding back the region's economy, and in 1971 a study was commissioned by the recently created Tyneside Passenger Transport Authority into how the transport system could be improved. By 1984, the final cost of the project was £265 million.

Following closure for conversion to the Tyne and Wear Metro on 1 June 1981, the station was subsequently demolished and rebuilt.

Jarrow was formerly situated on a single line section of track, with the station situated on a long passing loop for Tyne and Wear Metro services, and therefore two platforms. On the north side of the station there was a single-track line used by freight trains. However, since the completion of the Metro Flow project in late 2022, freight trains now share Metro tracks.

=== Metro Flow ===
During the 2020 Budget, the UK Government announced an investment of £95 million towards the £103 million Metro Flow project, which was developed to increase capacity on the network by up to 30,000 passenger journeys per day, as well as improve reliability on the branch between Pelaw and South Shields. Furthermore, the project included the acquisition of four additional Stadler units, complementing the fleet of 42 units already on order.

Between September 2022 and December 2022, a full closure of the branch between Pelaw and South Shields took place. The project saw three sections of single line converted to dual line, between Pelaw and Hebburn (800 m (0.5 mi)), Hebburn and Jarrow (1.4 km (0.9 mi)) and Jarrow and Bede, as well as the electrification and redesign of a previously freight-only line to operate using a similar system to the existing shared National Rail line between Pelaw and Sunderland.

== Facilities ==
Step-free access is available at all stations across the Tyne and Wear Metro network, with tactile paving installed on both platforms. The station is equipped with ticket machines, waiting shelter, seating, next train information displays, timetable posters, and an emergency help point on both platforms. Ticket machines are able to accept payment with credit and debit card (including contactless payment), notes and coins. The station is also fitted with smartcard validators, which feature at all stations across the network. There is a free car park at the station, with 80 spaces, plus four accessible spaces, as well as a taxi rank. There is also the provision for cycle parking, with five cycle pods available for use.

== Services ==
=== Bus ===
The bus station, which is located adjacent to the Metro station, is served by local bus operators Go North East and Stagecoach North East. It has five departure stands (lettered A–E), each of which has a waiting shelter, seating, next bus information displays, and timetable posters. Routes serve South Tyneside, as well as neighbouring Gateshead, Newcastle upon Tyne and Sunderland. Between November 2014 and March 2015, work was undertaken as part of a £120,000 refurbishment project – improving waiting areas, lighting and security.

As of October 2024, the stand allocation is:

Stand	Route	Destination
A	5	South Shields via Fellgate, Boldon Colliery, Whiteleas, South Tyneside Hospital, Chichester & Westoe
A	5A	South Shields via Fellgate, Boldon Colliery, East Boldon, Cleadon, Whiteleas, South Tyneside Hospital, Chichester & Westoe
A	9	Sunderland via Fellgate, Boldon Colliery, West Boldon, East Boldon & Fulwell
A	960	South Shields via Brockley Whins, Harton Nook, Marsden, Horsley Hill & Westoe
B	11	South Shields via Hill Park, Simonside, Biddick Hall, Whiteleas, South Tyneside Hospital, Harton Nook, Marsden & Horsley Hill
B	26	South Shields via Hedworth, Brockley Whins, South Tyneside Hospital, Chichester & Westoe
B	599	Sunderland via IAMP, Castletown, Enterprise Park, Southwick, Pallion & Royal Hospital
C	27	South Shields via Tyne Dock, Chichester & Westoe
D	9	North Shields
D	26	Lukes Lane via Hebburn
D	599	Hebburn
E	27	Newcastle via Hebburn, Bill Quay, Pelaw, Heworth, Sunderland Road & Gateshead
E	960	Waterview Park via Hebburn & Washington Galleries

=== Tyne and Wear Metro ===
As of April 2024, the station is served by up to five trains per hour on weekdays and Saturday, and up to four trains per hour during the evening and on Sunday. Services operate between South Shields and St James via Whitley Bay. (Note: Prior to 12 December 2005, services operated between South Shields and Airport.)

== Art ==
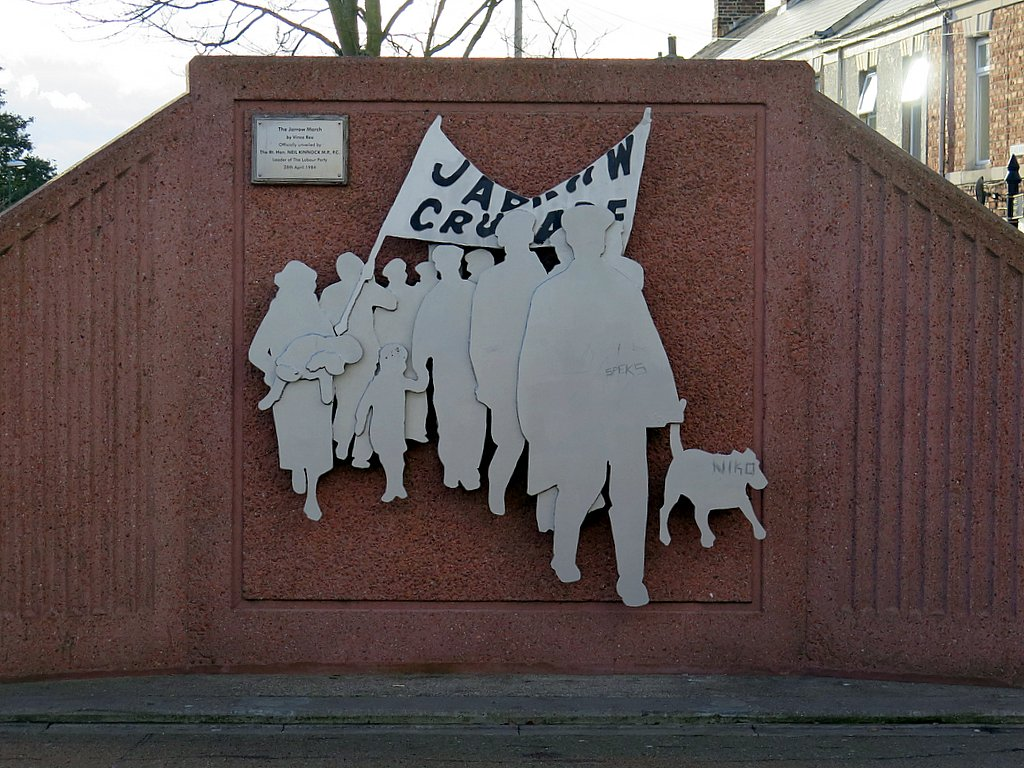
Vince Rea's Jarrow March (1984)

Vince Rea's Jarrow March (1984) art installation commemorates the 207 people who, in October 1936, walked from Tyneside to London to protest about the lack of jobs in the area. The work is made from steel recycled from a scrapped ship.

== Sources ==
- Quick, Michael (2022) [2001]. Railway passenger stations in Great Britain: a chronology (PDF). version 5.04. Railway & Canal Historical Society. Archived from the original (PDF) on 25 November 2022.
