= Gateshead Stadium Metro station =

Tyne and Wear Metro station in Gateshead

Gateshead Stadium
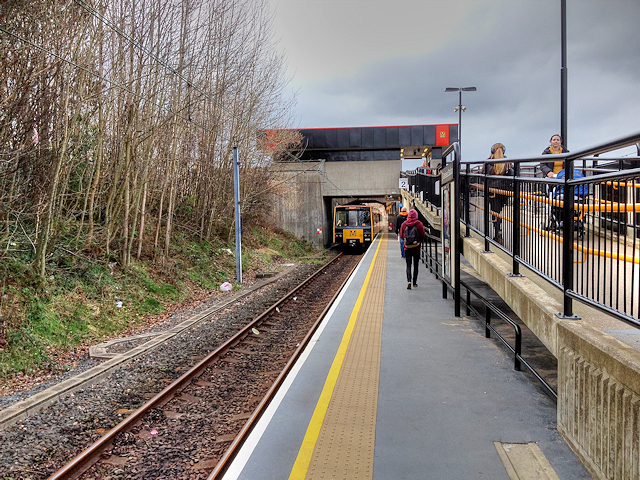

General information
- Location: St James Road, Gateshead, NE8; Metropolitan Borough of Gateshead; England
- Coordinates: 54.9577°N 1.5882°W
- OS Grid ref: NZ 2645 6265
- System: Tyne and Wear Metro
- Owner: Nexus
- Lines: Green line; Yellow line
- Platforms: 2
- Tracks: 2

Construction
- Cycle facilities: 2 cycle pods, with space for 4 bikes
- Accessible: Step-free access throughout, with level-boarding to Class 555 trains

Other information
- Station code: GST
- Fare zone: A

History
- Original company: Tyne and Wear Metro

Key dates
- 15 November 1981: Opened

Passengers
- 2024/25: 1.058 million

Services
Preceding station	Tyne and Wear Metro	Following station
Felling towards South Hylton	Green line	Gateshead towards Airport
Felling towards South Shields	Yellow line	Gateshead towards St James via Whitley Bay
Location
- Location within Tyne and Wear

Gateshead Stadium is a Tyne and Wear Metro station, serving Gateshead International Stadium in the area of East Gateshead in Tyne and Wear, England. It on 15 November 1981, as part of the third phase of the network, between Haymarket and Heworth Interchange.

== History ==
The station was purpose-built for the network and is named after the nearby Gateshead International Stadium. During the planning phase, the station was intended to be named Old Fold, after a neighbouring residential area.

== Facilities ==
The station has two platforms, both of which have seating, next-train audio and visual displays, timetable and information posters, and an emergency help point.

Additional facilities are available on the concourse; the ticket machines accept credit and debit cards (including contactless payment), notes and coins. The station is also fitted with smartcard validators, which feature at all stations across the network.

There is step-free access to the island platform by ramp, with platforms also accessed by staircase. There is cycle storage at the station, with two cycle pods.

=== Refurbishment ===
In 2015, the station was refurbished, along with nearby Felling. Improvements include the installation of new seating and lighting, dual handrails, tactile paving, anti-slip surfacing on stairs and platform nosing and colour variation of the floor. The station was also rebranded in the new black and white corporate colour scheme.

== Services ==
As of June 2026, the station is served by up to ten trains per hour – five trains in each direction on both of the Yellow and Green lines – on weekdays and Saturdays, and up to eight trains per hour during the evening and on Sundays. In the northbound direction, half the trains run to Newcastle Airport and half to St James via Whitley Bay. In the southbound direction, half the trains run to South Shields and half to South Hylton via Sunderland.
