= Gateshead railway station =

Former railway station in England

Gateshead

General information
- Location: Gateshead, England
- Coordinates: 54.9659°N 1.6071°W
- Grid reference: NZ252635
- Platforms: 4

Other information
- Status: Disused

History
- Original company: Newcastle and Darlington Junction Railway
- Pre-grouping: North Eastern Railway
- Post-grouping: London and North Eastern Railway

Key dates
- 18 June 1844: Station opened as Gateshead
- 1 December 1868: Renamed Gateshead East; Gateshead West opened
- between 1948 and 1953: Renamed Gateshead
- 1 November 1965: Gateshead West platforms closed
- 23 November 1981: Station closed
Location

Gateshead railway station served the town of Gateshead, England between 1844 and 1981. It was situated on the northern and western sides of the triangular junction to the south of the High Level Bridge which connects Gateshead with Newcastle upon Tyne. There were two portions to the station on different routes; at times they were known as Gateshead East and Gateshead West.

== History ==
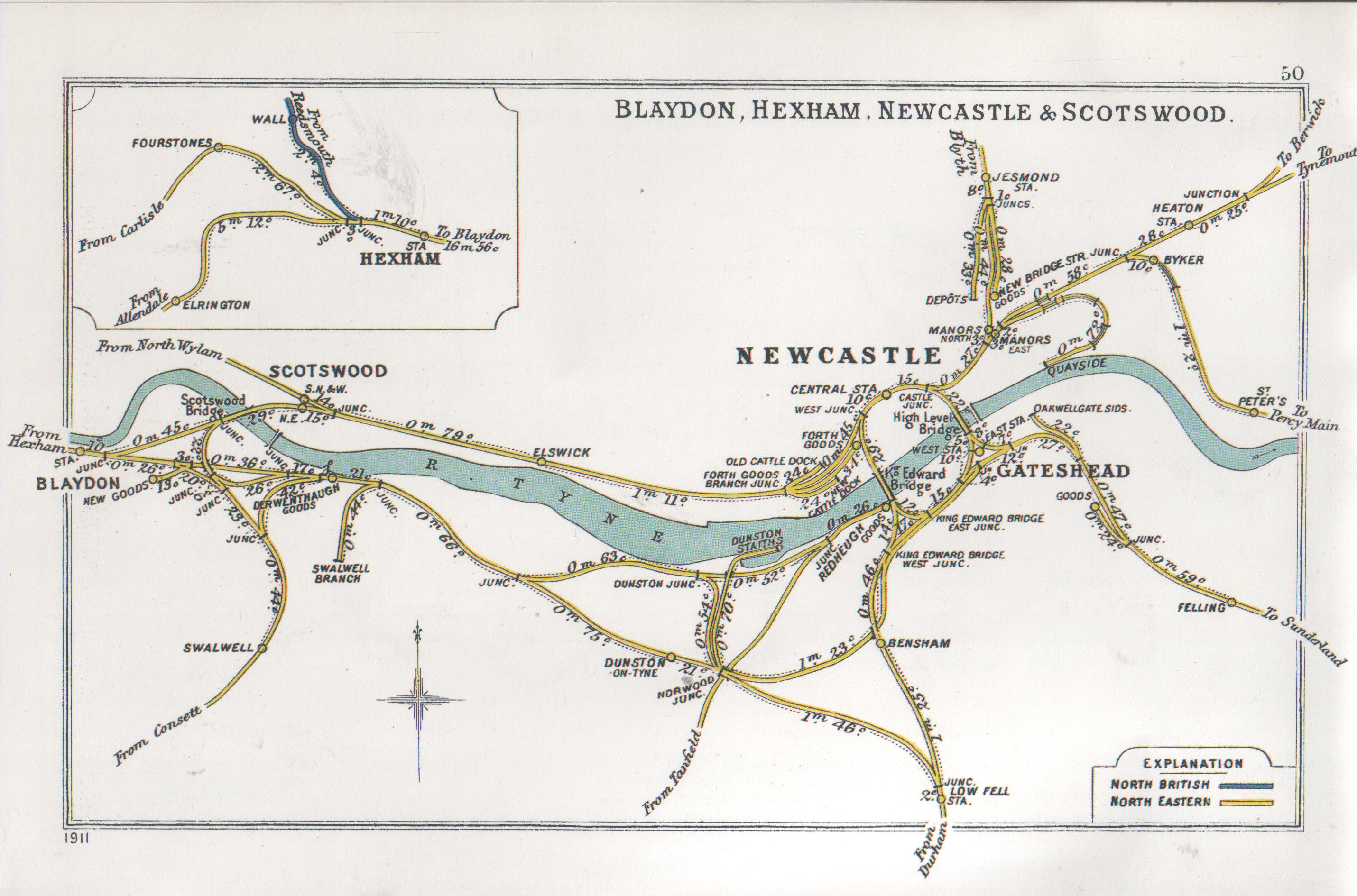
A 1911 Railway Clearing House Junction Diagram showing railways in the vicinity of Gateshead

The station was opened by the Newcastle and Darlington Junction Railway on 18 June 1844. The Team Valley Line from Gateshead to Durham via Chester-le-Street opened to passengers on 1 December 1868, and on that day, a second pair of platforms at Gateshead opened to serve that line; these were known as Gateshead West, and the original pair became Gateshead East. Facilities were initially modest at both stations, but the NER subsequently provided trainsheds on both sides to give waiting passengers shelter from the wind at what was quite an exposed location. The West station has its roof built prior to opening, whilst its immediate neighbour was given one when rebuilt between 1884 and 1886. Both stations were well served in NER and LNER days - the East station had over 100 departures on the lines to Sunderland and South Shields whilst West had around 30 trains per day to Durham and to Blackhill via Consett. The frequent service and location close to the main centres of industry and population meant both stations were very well patronised - in 1911 more than 491,000 tickets were issued from the two combined. In 1938, the London and North Eastern Railway also electrified the lines through the East station as an extension of the electric system already in use on the suburban routes north of the river.

At some point between 1948 and 1953, the name was simplified to Gateshead as the number of services from the West station had dwindled to almost nothing by 1951. The 1960s brought further retrenchment - British Railways ended electric services to and from South Shields in 1963 in favour of diesel operation (deeming that the cost of renewing the electrical equipment was not justifiable in the face of declining patronage) and on 1 November 1965, the former Gateshead West platforms finally closed.

The remainder of the station lost its trainshed in 1968, but continued to be served throughout the 1970s. It was eventually closed on 23 November 1981, having been effectively made redundant by the newly commissioned Tyne and Wear Metro route between Newcastle and Heworth. A new sub-surface Gateshead Metro station on this line had been opened about 1/4 mile (400 m) to the south-east a few days previously. The platforms and buildings at Gateshead East remained substantially intact until the late 1980s, but after sustaining major fire damage they were demolished in 1990. The former West platforms by contrast are still intact and visible from passing trains, though the buildings have been cleared and the line passing through them singled in 1991 as part of the Newcastle area resignalling scheme.

Preceding station	Historical railways	Following station
	Gateshead East	
Felling; Line open, station closed	North Eastern Railway; Newcastle and Darlington Junction Railway	Newcastle Central; Line and station open
	Gateshead West	
Bensham; Line open, station closed	North Eastern Railway; Team Valley Line	Newcastle Central; Line and station open
Dunston; Line and station open	North Eastern Railway	Newcastle Central; Line and station open
