= Hebburn =

Town in South Tyneside, Tyne and Wear, England

Coordinates: 54.972°N 1.513°W

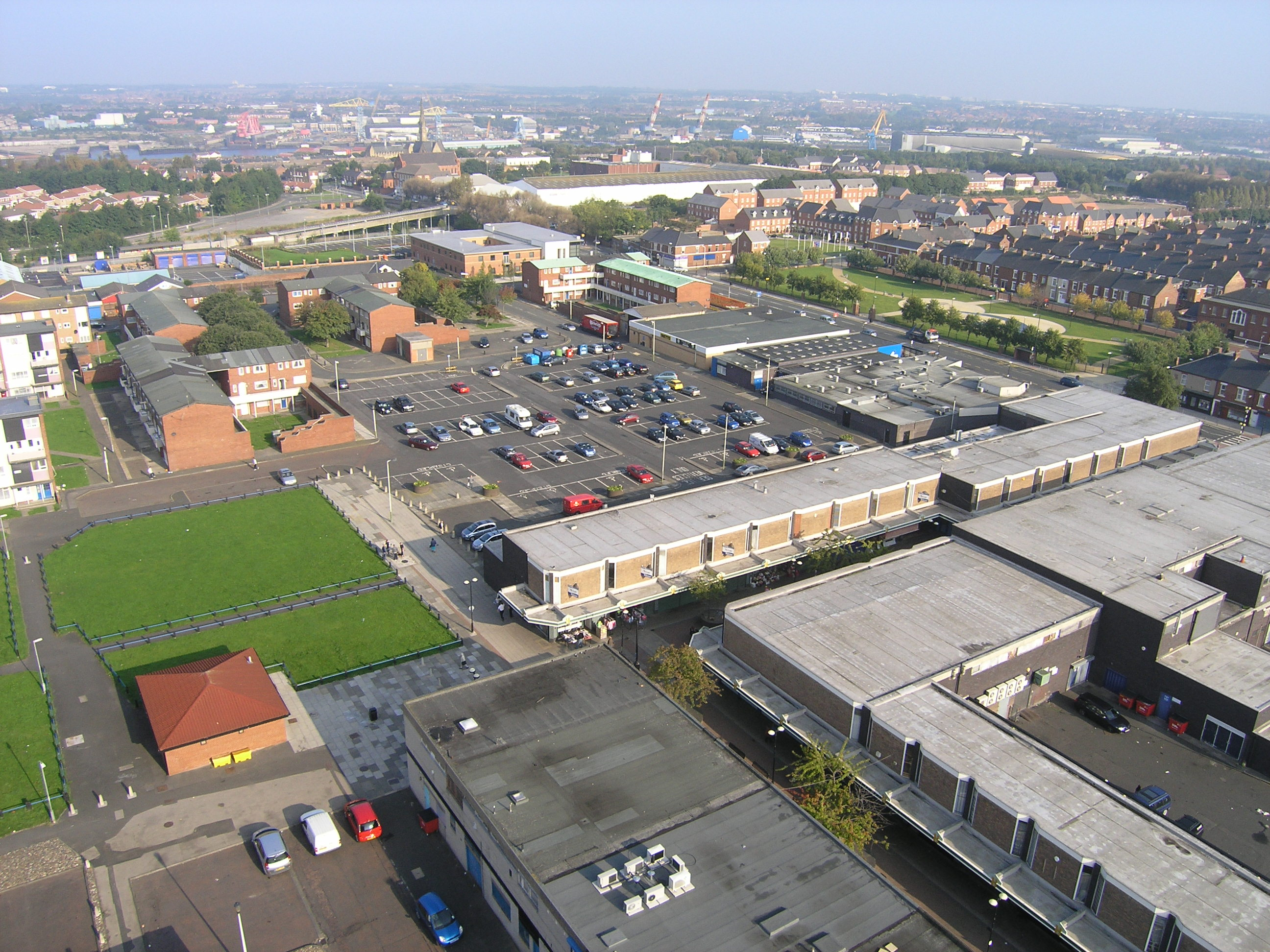
- Aerial view of the centre

- Location within Tyne and Wear
- Population: 21,345 (Built up area, 2021)
- OS grid reference: NZ318645
- Metropolitan borough: South Tyneside
- Metropolitan county: Tyne and Wear
- Region: North East
- Country: England
- Sovereign state: United Kingdom
- Post town: HEBBURN
- Postcode district: NE31
- Dialling code: 0191
- Police: Northumbria
- Fire: Tyne and Wear
- Ambulance: North East
- UK Parliament: Jarrow and Gateshead East

Hebburn is a town in the South Tyneside borough of Tyne and Wear, England. It was historically in County Durham and became part of Tyne and Wear in 1974. It is on the south bank of the River Tyne between Gateshead and Jarrow and opposite Wallsend and Walker. At the 2021 census the Hebburn built up area as defined by the Office for National Statistics had a population of 21,345.

== History ==
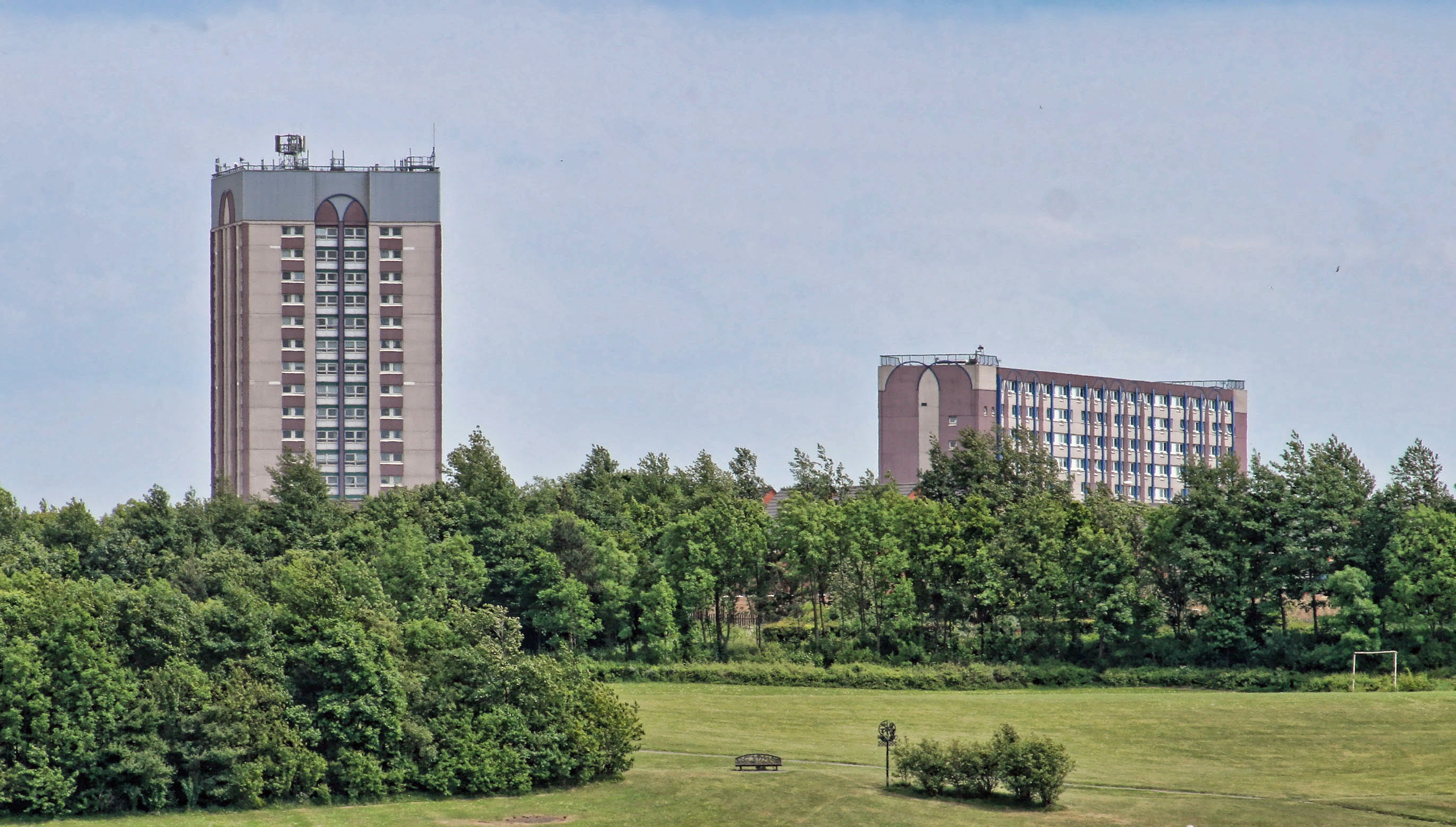
Hebburn in 2011, with Westmoreland Court and Durham Court flats visible on the skyline.

In Saxon times Hebburn was a small fishing hamlet upon the river Tyne. It is thought that the name Hebburn may be derived from the Old English terms, heah meaning "high", and byrgen meaning a "burial mound", though it could also mean the high place beside the water. The first record of Hebburn mentions a settlement of fishermen's huts in the 8th century, which were burned by the Vikings.

In the 14th century, the landscape was dominated by a peel tower. A 4-foot-6-inch-tall (137-centimetre) wall, a portion of which still remains at St. John's Church, could also be seen. The Lordship of the Manor of Hebburn passed through the hands of a number of families during the Middle Ages, including the Hodgsons of Hebburn (James 1974, Hodgson).

In the early 1600s, the wealthy Newcastle family, the Ellisons, acquired the land of Hebburn. Coal was mined at Hebburn as early as the 17th century. In 1792 the Ellisons received royalties from coal mining expansion when Hebburn Colliery opened. The colliery eventually operated three pits. In 1786 the Ellisons’ Hebburn estate also made income from dumping ships ballast at Hebburn Quay. By the 1800s the Ellison family had expanded Hebburn Manor into their Hebburn Hall estate. Hebburn Colliery played an important role in the investigations into the development of mine safety, following the mining disaster at Felling Colliery in 1812.

Humphry Davy stayed with Cuthbert Ellison at Hebburn Hall in 1815 and took samples of the explosive methane 'fire damp' gas from the Hebburn mine which were taken to London in wine bottles for experiments into the development of a miners' safety lamp. Davy's lamps were tested in the Hebburn mine and remarkably the gauze that protected the naked flames could actually absorb the fire damp so that the lamps could shine more effectively.

In 1853, Andrew Leslie arrived from Aberdeen, Scotland. He expanded the Ellison estate, further, with shipbuilding, and in 200 years of industrialisation, Hebburn grew into a modern town of 20,000 inhabitants. When the railways arrived in Hebburn in 1872, further growth took off in the Ellison estate, with the growth of the brick, metal and chemical industries.

Andrew Leslie's shipyard launched two hundred and fifty-five ships before 1885. In 1885 the shipyard merged with local locomotive builder W Hawthorne, and then changed its name to Hawthorn Leslie and Company, and grew even more.

Hebburn also hosted its own Highland Games, with the first one being held in 1883, which were usually held annually in July or August, spanning over three decades and with professional sportsmen coming from Scotland and as far as Oban to compete.

In 1901, Alphonse Reyrolle's, Reyrolle Electrical Switchgear Company opened. In 1932 Hebburn colliery closed. 200 miners were killed during the life of the colliery. The youngest were 10 years old. In 1936 Monkton Coke Works was built by the Government, in response to the Jarrow Hunger March in 1932.

In the Second World War, the Battle of Britain occurred in 1940, and Hitler had planned an amphibious attack that was predicated on defeating the RAF in the battle. Hitler's planned first wave of attack, in his Operation Sea Lion plan, was to try to capture Aberdeen and Newcastle. Hitler's Operation Sea Lion documents had detailed plans to capture the Reyrolle Electrical Switchgear Company.

Hawthorn Leslie built everything from liners to tankers. Many Royal Navy battleships were built at Hawthorn Leslie shipyard. In WWII the yard built 41 naval vessels and repaired another 120. In 1944, the yard also built D-day landing craft, including the Landing Craft Tank (LCT) 7074. In April 2020, the craft was housed in the D-Day Story museum. In 2020, the boat was only one of ten craft of its kind to survive postwar.

One ship built at the shipyard was HMS Kelly, launched in 1938 and commanded by Lord Louis Mountbatten. The ship, a K-Class destroyer, was commissioned just eleven days before WWII. The ship was hit three times. In December 1939, she was damaged by a German mine not far from the river Tyne. On 9 May 1940, she was torpedoed off Norway with the loss of 27 lives. Badly damaged, she crawled back to Hawthorn Leslie on a 92-hour journey to be repaired. In 1941, HMS Kelly was sunk off Crete. One hundred and thirty men were killed in the disaster and they are remembered in memorials at Hebburn Cemetery, which were erected by surviving members of the crew and workers from Hawthorn Leslie. The ship's story forms the basis of the 1942 film In Which We Serve. The shipyard is now owned by Hebburn Riverside Development Limited and construction has commenced for a landmark residential development called Kelly's Wharf.

The Monkton Coke Works plant closed in 1990, and was demolished in 1992. The former British Short-Circuit Testing Station in Victoria Road West within the town, owned by A. Reyrolle & Company provided the backdrop for the Gary Numan video "Metal". The facility was demolished in 2011.

In 2012, the BBC commissioned a television series Hebburn to be set in the town. It was created and co-written by Jason Cook, who was raised in Hebburn. The first episode was broadcast on 18 October 2012.

4th Battalion the Parachute Regiment and 23 SAS Reserves have bases in Hebburn. The Air Cadets have a unit located at Hebburn TA Centre.

Hebburn has an ecology centre powered by wind turbines. It is the location of a shipyard, operated by A&P Group.

== Governance ==
There are is one main tier of local government covering Hebburn, at metropolitan borough level: South Tyneside Council. The council is a member of the North East Combined Authority, led by the directly elected Mayor of the North East. For national elections, the town forms part of the Jarrow and Gateshead East constituency.

=== Administrative history ===
Hebburn historically formed part of the ancient parish of Jarrow in the Chester Ward of County Durham. The parish was subdivided into seven townships: Harton, Hedworth, Heworth, Monkton, South Shields, Westoe, and a Jarrow township which covered both the settlement of Jarrow itself and Hebburn. The four townships of Harton, Heworth, South Shields, and Westoe each took on civil functions under the poor laws from the 17th century onwards. They therefore each became civil parishes in 1866 when the legal definition of 'parish' was changed to be the areas used for administering the poor laws. The other three townships jointly administered their poor law functions and so became a single civil parish called "Hedworth Monkton and Jarrow".

In 1873, the western part of that parish was made the Hebburn local government district, which was then administered by an elected local board. Such districts were reconstituted as urban districts under the Local Government Act 1894. The 1894 Act also directed that civil parishes could no longer straddle borough or district boundaries, and so a new civil parish of Hebburn was created, matching the urban district.

The urban district council adopted the Ellison family crest as its coat of arms. The council was based at offices on Argyle Street until 1967 when it moved to a new civic centre on Campbell Park Road.

Hebburn Urban District was abolished in 1974 to become part of the new metropolitan borough of South Tyneside in the new metropolitan county of Tyne and Wear. Hebburn Civic Centre was used as an area office for South Tyneside Council (which has its headquarters in South Shields) for some years, but closed and was demolished in 2016 to make way for a residential development.

== Education ==
Hebburn has two secondary schools: St Joseph's Catholic Academy (formerly St Joseph's Comprehensive School) and Hebburn Comprehensive School.

== Sport ==
Hebburn Town F.C. is the town's local non-league football team. Formed in 1912, as of the 2026–27 season they play in the National League North, at the sixth tier of the English football pyramid. Hebburn Argyle, which existed in the early 1900s, reformed several years ago as a youth club.

Athletics is also catered for at Monkton Stadium, home of Jarrow and Hebburn Athletic Club, where Brendan Foster, Steve Cram and David Sharpe are notable past runners.

A short lived greyhound racing track was opened in 1945. The plans to build the track were passed in September 1944 and it cost £30,000 to construct a venue that could accommodate 6,000 people. The racing was independent (not affiliated to the sports governing body the National Greyhound Racing Club) and was known as a flapping track, which was the nickname given to independent tracks. The track was trading in 1947 but it is not known when it closed.

== Transport ==
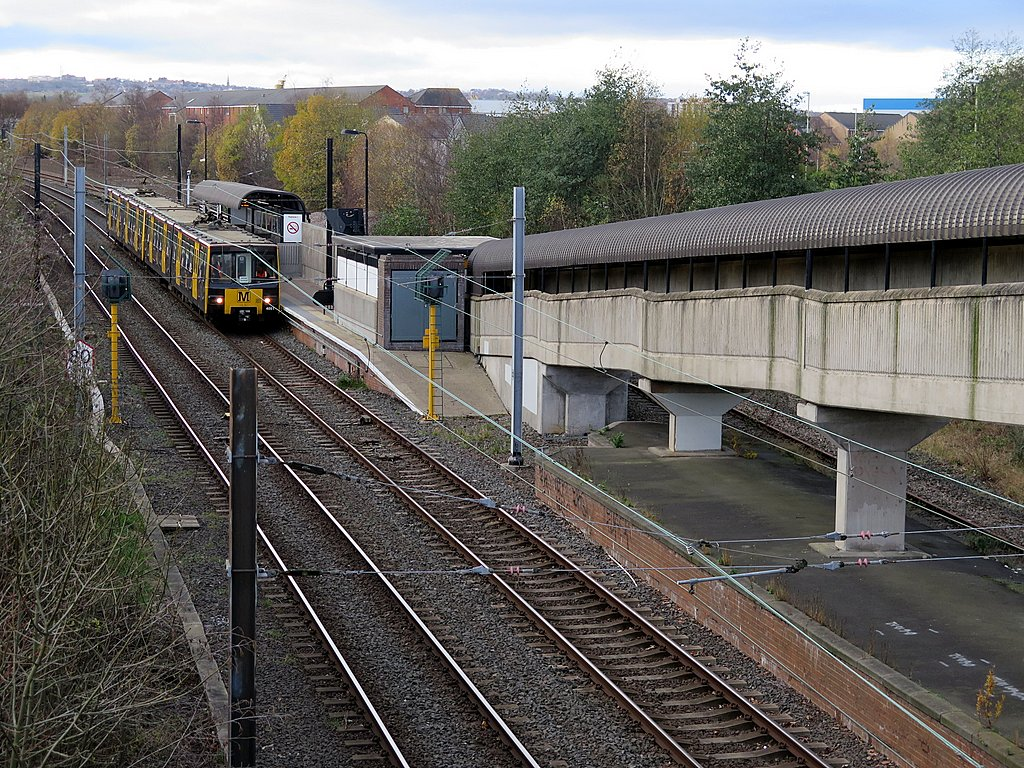
Hebburn metro station

Hebburn Metro station is a stop on the Tyne and Wear Metro. It is situated between Jarrow and Pelaw station. The Yellow line serves stations between South Shields, Newcastle Central, Whitley Bay and St James.

The nearest National Rail station is at Heworth, which is a stop on the Durham Coast Line between Newcastle, Sunderland, Hartlepool and Middlesbrough; services are operated by Northern Trains.

Bus services are provided predominantly by Stagecoach North East and Go North East; routes link the town to South Shields, Jarrow, Gateshead and Newcastle.

A mid-Tyne ferry service, which was owned by several shipyards, once operated between Hebburn, Walker and Wallsend; it last ran in 1986. One of the fleet, run by the Mid Tyne Ferry Co, was called the Tyne Queen; in 2020, she was named the Jacobite Queen and was still working on Loch Ness, Inverness, Scotland.

== Notable people ==
=== Academia ===
- Dominic Bruce, RAF officer and later a college principal who in WWII, escaped from Colditz Castle and Schloss Spangenberg
- Arthur Holmes, geologist
- John Miles (musician) Songwriter
- Brian David Smith, academic researcher
- John Steven Watson, English historian
- Paul Younger, hydrogeologist and environmental engineer

=== Engineering ===
- Andrew Leslie, shipbuilder

=== Entertainment ===
- Jason Cook, comedian, writer of the BBC sitcom Hebburn
- Robert Saint, composer, best known for his musical composition "Gresford", also known as "The Miners Hymn"
- Frank Wappat, BBC Radio presenter and disc jockey, founder of Memory Lane magazine

=== Politics ===
- Sir Fergus Montgomery, Conservative MP and Margaret Thatcher's Parliamentary Private Secretary (prior to her becoming Prime Minister)

=== Sport ===
- George Armstrong, football player with Arsenal F.C.
- Chris Basham, football player with Blackpool F.C., Bolton Wanderers F.C. and Sheffield United F.C.
- Ian Chipchase, athlete and gold medalist at the 1974 Commonwealth Games
- Josef Craig, British Paralympic swimmer, who won Gold at the 2012 Paralympic Games
- Johnny Dixon, football player with Aston Villa F.C.
- Jack English, football player
- Carl Finnigan, football player with St Johnstone F.C., Falkirk F.C., South Shields F.C. and Newcastle United F.C.
- Sir Brendan Foster, athlete and sports commentator
- Wilfred Milne, football player
- Chris Rigg, football player with Sunderland A.F.C.
- Ray Wood, football player with Manchester United F.C.

== Bibliography ==
James, Mervyn (1974) Family, Lineage, and Civil Society: A Study of Society, Politics, and Mentality in the Durham Region, 1500-1640 (Oxford: Oxford University Press).
