= Hebburn Metro station =

Tyne and Wear Metro station in South Tyneside, England

Hebburn
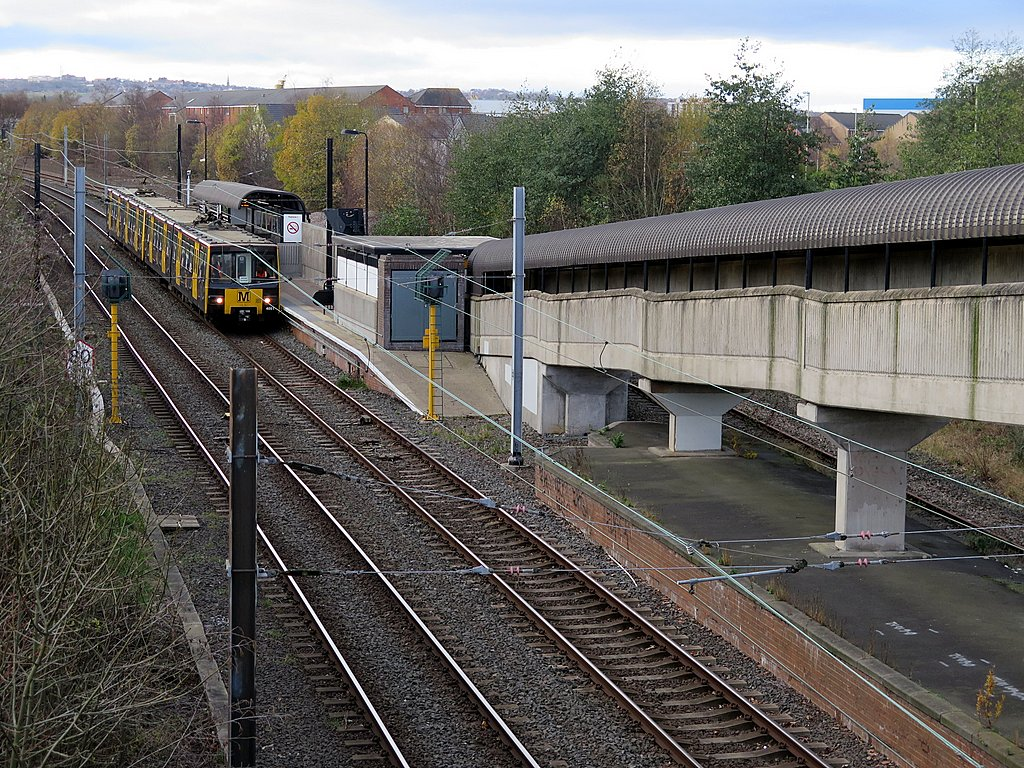

General information
- Location: Hebburn, South Tyneside; England
- Coordinates: 54°58′31″N 1°31′16″W
- Grid reference: NZ307645
- System: Tyne and Wear Metro station
- Transit authority: Tyne and Wear PTE
- Platforms: 2
- Tracks: 2

Construction
- Parking: 80 spaces
- Cycle facilities: 5 cycle pods
- Accessible: Step-free access to platform

Other information
- Station code: HEB
- Fare zone: B

History
- Original company: North Eastern Railway
- Pre-grouping: North Eastern Railway
- Post-grouping: London and North Eastern Railway, British Rail (Eastern Region)

Key dates
- 1 March 1872: Opened
- 1 June 1981: Closed for conversion
- 24 March 1984: Reopened

Passengers
- 2024/25: 1.099 million

Services
| Preceding station | Tyne and Wear Metro | Following station |
|---|---|---|
| Jarrow towards South Shields | Yellow line | Pelaw towards St James via Whitley Bay |
Location
- Location within Tyne and Wear

Hebburn is a Tyne and Wear Metro station, serving the town of Hebburn, in South Tyneside, Tyne and Wear, England. It joined the network on 24 March 1984, following the opening of the fifth phase of the network between Heworth and South Shields.

== History ==
The station was opened by the North Eastern Railway on 1 March 1872.

In 1935, the London North Eastern Railway unveiled plans to electrify the South Shields branch, with the branch joining the Tyneside Electrics network of services in 1938.

Owing to falling passenger numbers during the 1960s, rising costs and the need to renew life-expired infrastructure and rolling stock, the Tyneside Electrics network was de-electrified and converted to diesel multiple unit operation in 1963.

During the early 1970s, the poor local transport system was identified as one of the main factors holding back the region's economy; in 1971, a study was commissioned by the recently created Tyneside Passenger Transport Authority into how the transport system could be improved. By 1984, the final cost of the project was £265 million.

Following closure for conversion in the early 1980s, the station was demolished and rebuilt, with staggered platforms on each side of the Station Road road bridge.

=== Metro Flow ===
During the 2020 Budget, the UK Government announced an investment of £95 million towards the £103 million Metro Flow project, which was developed to increase capacity on the network by up to 30,000 passenger journeys per day, as well as improve reliability on the branch between Pelaw and South Shields. Furthermore, the project included the acquisition of four additional Stadler units, complementing the fleet of 42 units already on order.

Between September 2022 and December 2022, a full closure of the branch between Pelaw and South Shields took place. The project saw three sections of single line converted to dual line, between Pelaw and Hebburn (800 m (0.5 mi)), Hebburn and Jarrow (1.4 km (0.9 mi)) and Jarrow and Bede, as well as the electrification and redesign of a previously freight-only line to operate using a similar system to the existing shared National Rail line between Pelaw and Sunderland.

== Facilities ==
Step-free access is available at all stations across the Tyne and Wear Metro network, with tactile paving installed on both platforms. The station is equipped with ticket machines, waiting shelter, seating, next train information displays, timetable posters, and an emergency help point on both platforms. Ticket machines are able to accept payment with credit and debit cards, notes and coins. The station is also fitted with smartcard validators, which feature at all stations across the network.

There is a free car park at the station, with 80 spaces, plus four accessible spaces, as well as a taxi rank. There is also the provision for cycle parking, with five cycle pods available for use.

== Services ==
As of April 2024, the station is served by up to five trains per hour on weekdays and Saturday, with up to four trains per hour during the evening and on Sunday. Services operate between South Shields and St James via Whitley Bay.
