= Felling Metro station =

Tyne and Wear Metro station in Gateshead

Felling
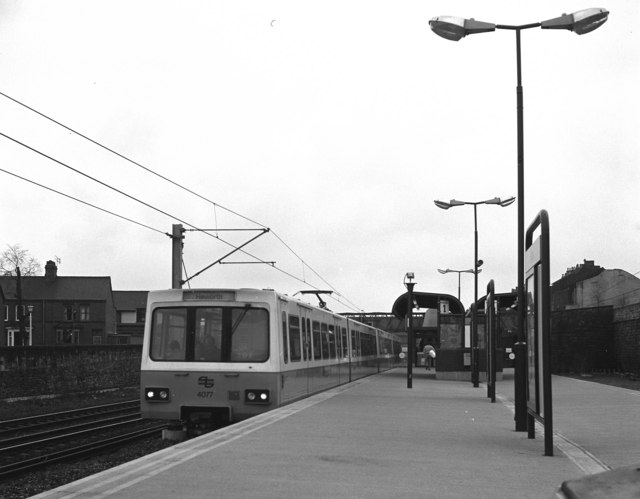
- Looking west along the platforms in 1982, with an original Metrocar waiting at the platform

General information
- Location: Sunderland Road, Felling, NE10; Metropolitan Borough of Gateshead; England
- Coordinates: 54.9531°N 1.5714°W
- OS Grid ref: NZ 2755 6213
- System: Tyne and Wear Metro
- Owner: Nexus
- Lines: Green line; Yellow line
- Platforms: 2
- Tracks: 2

Construction
- Parking: 27 spaces
- Cycle facilities: 4 cycle pods, with space for 8 bikes
- Accessible: Step-free access throughout, with level-boarding to Class 555 trains

Other information
- Status: Staffed intermittently
- Station code: FEL
- Fare zone: A and B

History
- Original company: Brandling Junction Railway
- Pre-grouping: North Eastern Railway
- Post-grouping: London and North Eastern Railway; British Rail (North Eastern Region); British Rail (Eastern Region)

Key dates
- 30 December 1839: Opened
- 18 November 1896: Relocated
- 5 November 1979: Closed for Metro conversion
- 15 November 1981: Re-opened as a Metro station

Passengers
- 2024/25: 0.843 million

Services
Preceding station	Tyne and Wear Metro	Following station
Heworth towards South Hylton	Green line	Gateshead Stadium towards Airport
Heworth towards South Shields	Yellow line	Gateshead Stadium towards St James via Whitley Bay
Location
- Location within Tyne and Wear

Felling is a Tyne and Wear Metro station, serving the suburb of Felling, Gateshead in Tyne and Wear, England. It opened as a Metro station on 15 November 1981, as part of the third phase of the network, between Haymarket and Heworth Interchange.

== History ==
The station was originally built for the Brandling Junction Railway, opening on 30 December 1839. On 18 November 1896, the station was relocated to the current site. The original Brandling Junction Railway station building is still extant on the north side of the line.

In November 1979, British Rail stations at Felling and Pelaw were closed, following the opening of the new Heworth Interchange. At this time, British Rail trains were concentrated on the former freight-only northern pair of tracks here, leaving the southern pair for Metro. Felling was reopened as part of the Tyne and Wear Metro network in November 1981.

== Accidents and incidents ==
On 26 March 1907, an express passenger train from Leeds to Newcastle Central was derailed while running between Heworth signal box and Felling station. Eight people were seriously injured, two of whom later died.

== Facilities ==
Step-free access is available at all stations across the Tyne and Wear Metro network, with ramps providing step-free access to platforms at Felling. The station was refurbished in 2015, along with Gateshead Stadium, and is branded in the new black and white corporate colour scheme.

The station is equipped with ticket machines, waiting shelter, seating, next train information displays, timetable posters, and an emergency help point. The ticket machines accept credit and debit cards (including contactless payment), notes and coins. The station is also fitted with smartcard validators, which feature at all stations across the network.

A small car park is available on Sunderland Road, with 27 parking spaces, plus three accessible spaces. There is also the provision for cycle parking, with four cycle pods.{

== Services ==
As of June 2026, the station is served by up to ten trains per hour – five trains in each direction on both of the Yellow and Green lines – on weekdays and Saturdays, and up to eight trains per hour during the evening and on Sundays. In the northbound direction, half the trains run to Newcastle Airport and half to St James via Whitley Bay. In the southbound direction, half the trains run to South Shields and half to South Hylton via Sunderland.
