= Gateshead Interchange =

Transport interchange in Gateshead

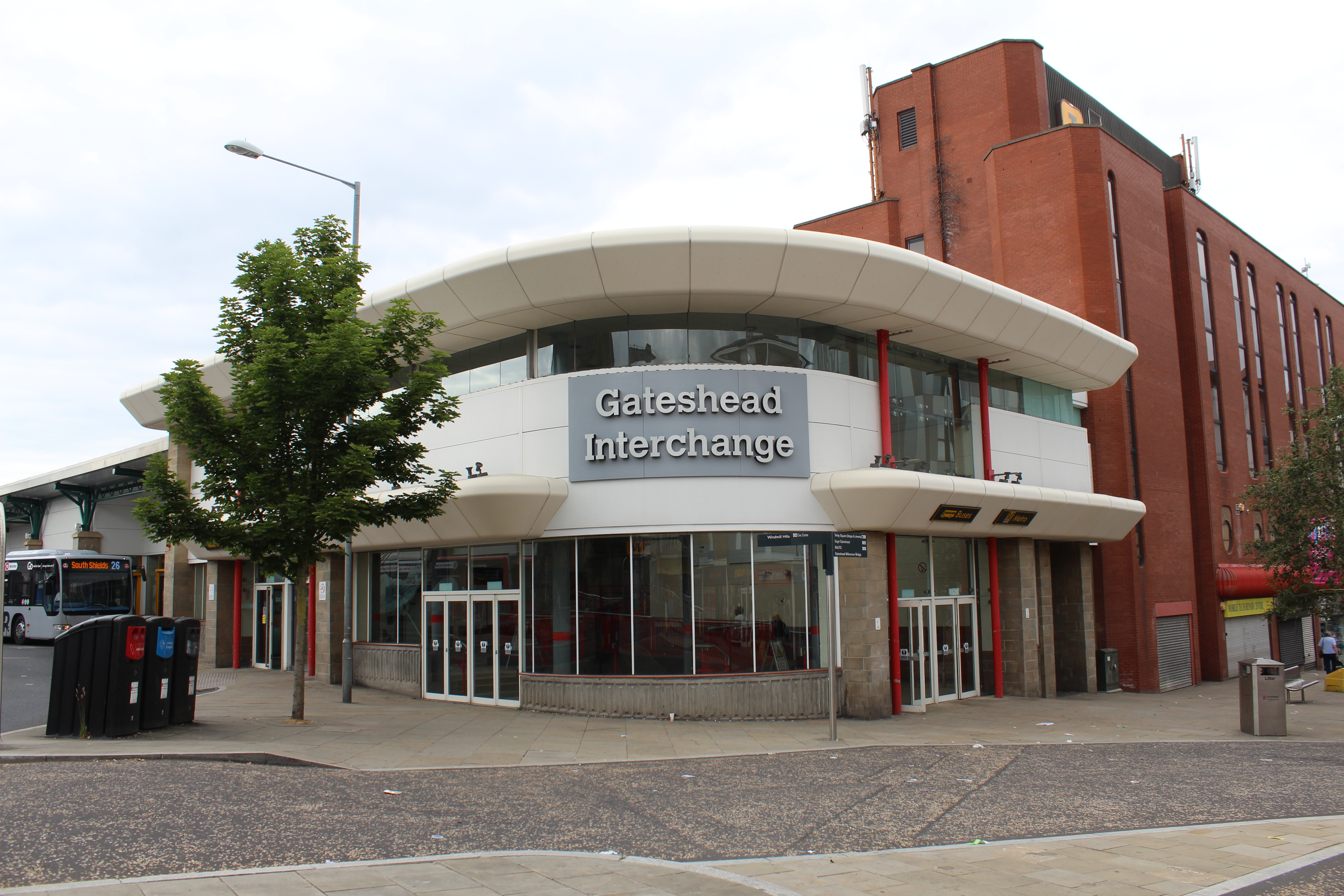

General information
- Location: West Street, Gateshead, NE8; Metropolitan Borough of Gateshead; England
- Coordinates: 54.9619°N 1.6048°W
- OS Grid ref: NZ 254 631
- System: Tyne and Wear Metro
- Owner: Nexus
- Operator: Nexus
- Lines: Green line; Yellow line
- Platforms: 2
- Tracks: 2
- Bus stands: 14 (A–N + Z)
- Bus operators: Arriva North East; Gateshead Central Buses; Go North East; Northstar

Construction
- Structure type: Underground
- Cycle facilities: 5 cycle pods with space for 10 bikes; 5 cycle racks
- Accessible: Step-free access throughout, with lifts from street-level to platforms and level-boarding to trains

Other information
- Status: Staffed intermittently
- Station code: GHD
- Fare zone: A

History
- Original company: Tyne and Wear Metro

Key dates
- 15 November 1981: Opened

Passengers
- 2020/21: ▼638,883 (Metro)
- 2021/22: ▲2.322 million (Metro)
- 2022/23: ▲2.900 million (Metro)
- 2023/24: ▼2.824 million (Metro)
- 2024/25: ▲3.202 million (Metro)

Services
Preceding station	Tyne and Wear Metro	Following station
Gateshead Stadium towards South Hylton	Green line	Central Station towards Airport
Gateshead Stadium towards South Shields	Yellow line	Central Station towards St James via Whitley Bay
Location
- Location within Tyne and Wear
Notes
- Metro passenger statistics from Nexus.

Gateshead Interchange is a multimodal transport hub, serving the town of Gateshead in Tyne and Wear, England. It opened on 15 November 1981, as part of the third phase of the network, between Haymarket and Heworth Interchange.

== History ==
The station replaced the former British Rail station, which closed in November 1981, with the Interchange situated around 400 m (440 yd) to the south west of the former station.

The design of the station is very different from the underground stations in central Newcastle, due to the different rock structure south of the River Tyne. The running tunnels are square, rather than circular in cross-section, with the station excavated as a box.

The Metro station was used by 3.202 million passengers in 2024/25, lower than the pre-pandemic figure of 3.554 million in 2018/19.

== Facilities ==
Step-free access is available at all stations across the Tyne and Wear Metro network, with lifts providing step-free access from street-level to platforms at Gateshead. The station is equipped with ticket machines, seating, next train information displays, timetable posters, and an emergency help point on both platforms. The ticket machines accept credit and debit cards (including contactless payment), notes and coins. The station is also fitted with smartcard validators, which feature at all stations across the network.

There is no dedicated car parking available at the station, however there are a number of pay and display car parks operated by Gateshead Council located nearby. A taxi rank is located on Walker Terrace. There is the provision for cycle parking, five cycle racks and five cycle pods available for use. A large bus interchange is located on the upper level, providing frequent connections across the region.

== Metro services ==
As of June 2026, the station is served by up to ten trains per hour – five trains in each direction on both of the Yellow and Green lines – on weekdays and Saturdays, and up to eight trains per hour during the evening and on Sundays. In the northbound direction, half the trains run to Newcastle Airport and half to St James via Whitley Bay. In the southbound direction, half the trains run to South Shields and half to South Hylton via Sunderland.

== Bus services ==
The bus station is located above the Tyne and Wear Metro station. It also opened on 15 November 1981, and was initially operated by Northern General – despite being designed in the house style of the Tyne and Wear PTE.

The original bus station was demolished and rebuilt in the early 2000s, to a design by Jefferson Sheard Architects. It was officially re-opened on 29 March 2004, by the then Secretary of State for Transport, Alistair Darling. The building houses a number of shops and services.

It is mostly served by Go North East's local bus services, with frequent routes serving Gateshead and Newcastle upon Tyne, as well as County Durham, South Tyneside, Sunderland and Teesside. Arriva North East, operating the hourly X12 service and independent operators Gateshead Central Buses, operating the TB29 and one 29 service, and Northstar, operating early morning and late evening 96 services, also serve the bus station.

The bus station has 13 departure stands (lettered A–N; no I), with an additional stand (X) used by long-distance coach services. Each stand is fitted with seating, next bus information displays, and timetable posters.

As of August 2026, the stand allocation is:

Stand	Route	Destination
A	53	Saltwell Park Circular via Coatsworth Road, Saltwell Park & Bensham Road
B	91A (Note: Peak-time journey(s) only.)	Team Valley South End via Team Valley North End
B	94	Team Valley Circular via Bensham Road, Team Valley, Low Fell, Queen Elizabeth Hospital & Heworth
B	96 (Note: Early morning and late evening services operated by Northstar)	MetroCentre Interchange via Lobley Hill & Dunston
B	301	MetroCentre Interchange via Lobley Hill, Whickham & Swalwell
B	X32	Stanley (Note: Some peak-time journeys extend to Consett via Annfield Plain.) express via Lobley Hill, Sunniside & East Stanley
B	X70	Consett express via Lobley Hill, Sunniside, Burnopfield, Tantobie, Dipton & Leadgate
B	X71A (Note: Evening journey only)	Consett express via Lobley Hill, Sunniside, Burnopfield & Medolmsley
B	X72 (Note: Evenings and Sundays only)	Stanley express via Lobley Hill, Sunniside, Burnopfield, Tantobie, Dipton & Annfield Plain
C	93	Team Valley Circular (Note: Evening journeys also operate via The Glasshouse.) via Gateshead College, Gateshead Stadium, Heworth, Queen Elizabeth Hospital, Low Fell & Team Valley
C	54	Newcastle Market Street Circular via Baltic Square, Quayside, Market Street & Central Station
D	Metro replacement bus via Gateshead Stadium	
E	28	Chester-le-Street via Queen Elizabeth Hospital, Wrekenton, Birtley, Ouston, Pelton, High Handenhold & Beamish Museum (Note: Only served during open hours)
E	28B (Note: Sunday trips terminate at Kibblesworth)	Chester-le-Street via Low Fell, Kibblesworth, Birtley, Ouston, Pelton & Newfield
E	29	Chester-le-Street via Low Fell, Kibblesworth, Ouston, Pelton, High Handenhold & Beamish Museum
E	301	Whitley Bay via Newcastle City Centre, Byker, Wallsend Interchange & North Shields Interchange
E	301A (Note: Early journey only.)	Newcastle Market Street
E	TB29	Racecourse Estate via Bensham
F	49	Winlaton via Dunston, Metrocentre Interchange, Swalwell & Blaydon
F	49A	Winlaton via Dunston, Metrocentre Interchange, Swalwell & Parkhead Estate
G	X66	MetroCentre Interchange express via Teams
H	X10	Middlesbrough express via Heworth, Dalton Park, Peterlee, Billingham & Stockton
J	51	Leam Lane Circular via Carr Hill, Felling Square, Heworth, Leam Lane Estate, Springwell & Wrekenton
J	56	Sunderland Park Lane Interchange via Queen Elizabeth Hospital, Wrekenton, Springwell, Concord, Nissan Factory, & Southwick
J	57	Wardley via Queen Elizabeth Hospital, Beacon Lough Estate, Leam Lane Estate & Heworth Interchange
J	58	Heworth Interchange (Note: Peak and Sunday journeys extend to Follingsby Amazon Warehouse) via Felling Square, Windy Nook & Leam Lane Estate
J	58A (Note: Evenings only)	Wardley via Felling Square, Windy Nook, Leam Lane Estate & Heworth Interchange
J	X58	Follingsby Amazon Warehouse express via Heworth Interchange
K	X1	South Hetton or Peterlee express via Queen Elizabeth Hospital, Springwell, Washington Galleries, Houghton-le-Spring, Hetton-le-Hole, South Hetton & Easington Village
K	X1A	Dalton Park express via Queen Elizabeth Hospital, Wrekenton, Springwell, Washington Galleries, Houghton-le-Spring, Hetton-le-Hole & Murton
K	X1B	Rickleton via express Queen Elizabeth Hospital, Wrekenton, Springwell & Washington Galleries
L	21	Brandon via Durham via Low Fell, Angel of the North, Birtley, Chester-le-Street, Arnison Centre, Pity Me, Framwellgate Moor, University Hospital of North Durham, Durham & Langley Moor
L	22	Chester-le-Street via Low Fell, Harlow Green, Wrekenton, Eighton Banks, Portobello & Barley Mow
L	81	Waterview Park or Sunderland Park Lane Interchange via Low Fell, Wrekenton, Birtley, Barley Mow, Washington Galleries, Waterview Park, Castletown & Hylton Riverside Park
L	N21 (Note: Friday & Saturday nights only.)	Durham Howlands Park & Ride; Night bus via Low Fell, Angel of the North, Birtley, Chester-le-Street, Pity Me, Framwellgate Moor, University Hospital of North Durham & Millburngate
L	X12	Middlesbrough via Durham express via Low Fell, Birtley, Chester-le-Street, Durham, Bowburn, Sedgefield, Stockton & Teesside Park
L	X21	West Auckland express via Low Fell, Chester-le-Street, Pity Me, Framwellgate Moor, Durham, Croxdale, Tudhoe, Spennymoor, Middlestone Moor & Bishop Auckland
M	27	South Shields via Felling, Heworth Interchange, Pelaw, Monkton Lane Estate, Hebburn, Jarrow, Chichester & Westoe
M	52	Leam Lane Circular via Shipcote, Dryden Road, Wrekenton, Springwell Estate, Leam Lane Estate & Heworth Interchange
N	All routes to Newcastle Eldon Square or Newcastle Market Street	
X	Metro replacement bus via Central Station	
X	Long-distance coach services and excursions	

- Key:
- Bus station
- National Rail station
- Tyne & Wear Metro station

== Artwork ==
The interchange features three artworks from Metro's Art on Transport programme.

Keith Grant's Night and Day artworks were commissioned for the station in the early 1980s, at opposite ends of the station at platform level. The artwork consists of two mosaic mountain peaks, set against the backdrop of a day and night sky.

A second art installation is in the tunnel and visible from northbound trains as they leave the station. Elizabeth Wright's Space Travel was commissioned in 2005, and showcases a series of 115 images which read like a short animated film strip.

Danny Lane's Opening Line installation features in the bus station, and consists of a sequence of forms in steel and glass, stretching about 90 m (300 ft) in length, 1 m (3 ft 3 in) in width, and up to 5 m (16 ft) in height.
