= Hebburn Comprehensive School =

Location
- Campbell Park Road; Hebburn, Tyne and Wear, NE31 2QU; England
- Coordinates: 54°58′03″N 1°30′45″W

Information
- Type: Community school
- Established: 1970
- Local authority: South Tyneside
- Department for Education URN: 108731 Tables
- Ofsted: Reports
- Gender: Coeducational
- Age: 11 to 16
- Enrolment: 949
- Website: www.hebburn.net

Hebburn Comprehensive School is a coeducational secondary school located in Hebburn, Tyne and Wear, England, with pupils aged from 11 to 16.

== History ==
An arson attack destroyed the gym on 5 November 1995.

The school was previously awarded specialist status as a Maths and Computing College. In the spring of 2010, the school began a complete refurbishment as part of the Building Schools for the Future programme that was completed in April 2012. The school now has features such as the Atrium and new IT facilities.

Hebburn Comprehensive School offers GCSEs and NCFE Technical awards as programmes of study for pupils.
