= Pelaw Metro station =

Tyne and Wear Metro station in Gateshead

Pelaw
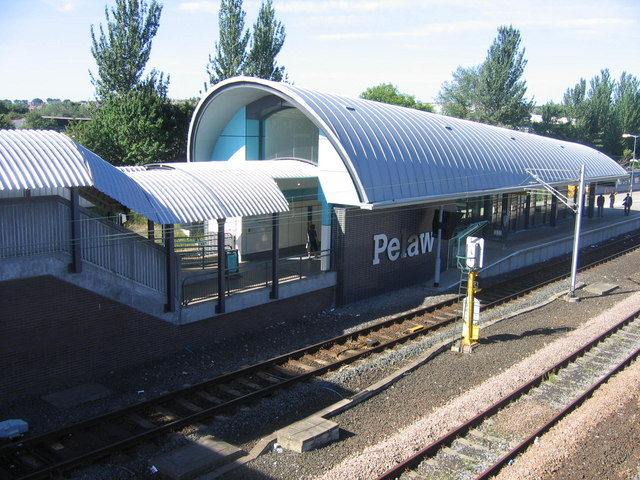

General information
- Location: Pelaw, Gateshead; England
- Coordinates: 54°57′10″N 1°32′29″W
- Grid reference: NZ294621
- System: Tyne and Wear Metro station
- Transit authority: Tyne and Wear PTE
- Platforms: 2
- Tracks: 2

Construction
- Cycle facilities: 3 cycle pods; 3 Sheffield stands
- Accessible: Step-free access to platform

Other information
- Station code: PLW
- Fare zone: B

History
- Original company: Brandling Junction Railway
- Pre-grouping: North Eastern Railway
- Post-grouping: London and North Eastern Railway; British Rail (Eastern Region)

Key dates
- 30 December 1839: Opened
- 5 November 1979: Closed
- 15 September 1985: Reopened

Passengers
- 2024/25: 1.702 million

Services
Preceding station	Tyne and Wear Metro	Following station
Fellgate towards South Hylton	Green line	Heworth towards Airport
Hebburn towards South Shields	Yellow line	Heworth towards St James via Whitley Bay
Location
- Location within Tyne and Wear

Pelaw is a Tyne and Wear Metro station, serving the suburbs of Bill Quay, Pelaw and Wardley, Gateshead in Tyne and Wear, England. It joined the network on 15 September 1985.

== History ==
The station opened by the Brandling Junction Railway on 30 December 1839. It became a junction in 1850, when the Newcastle and Darlington Junction Railway's cut-off route from Darlington via Washington was opened. The station was rebuilt slightly to the east in 1857, but then rebuilt again on the original site in 1896, following the opening of the branch line to Hebburn in 1872. This was then extended further, to South Shields in 1879. This station had an island platform serving just the southern pair of tracks.

Passenger services on the Leamside Line to Durham ended in September 1963, though it remained open for through freight until 1991 and for mineral traffic to the Wardley opencast loading point for some years after. The remaining stub is now out of use and the points clamped and disconnected. In preparation for the Metro, British Rail passenger services were diverted onto the freight-only northern pair of tracks between here and Park Lane Junction at Gateshead, and Felling and Pelaw stations closed on 5 November 1979, being replaced by a new station at Heworth Interchange. Trains continued to run round the disused platform at Pelaw for a short period before Pelaw Junction was remodelled, after which it was demolished to make way for the Metro tracks.

Pelaw was not initially replaced, but following the completion of new housing nearby a new station was built on the site of the old; it opened in September 1985, a year and a half after the South Shields line opened. It then became the terminus of the Yellow Line (from St. James), and the Red Line (from Benton), which has now been discontinued. Terminating trains continued to reverse in the sidings to the east of the station. When the Sunderland extension opened, Pelaw ceased to be a terminus, except in the morning and evening peaks. A grade-separated junction (partly using the existing flyover for South Shields-bound trains) allows Metro services to join the Durham Coast line without conflicting with main line trains.

== Facilities ==
In 2006, the station was rebuilt with a new ticket hall and indoor waiting area more appropriate to its position as the transfer station between the Sunderland and South Shields branches.

== Services ==
As of April 2021, the station is served by up to ten trains per hour on weekdays and Saturday, and up to eight trains per hour during the evening and on Sunday. Additional services operate between Pelaw and Benton, Monkseaton, Regent Centre or South Gosforth at peak times.
