= Heworth Interchange =

Transport interchange in Tyne and Wear

Heworth
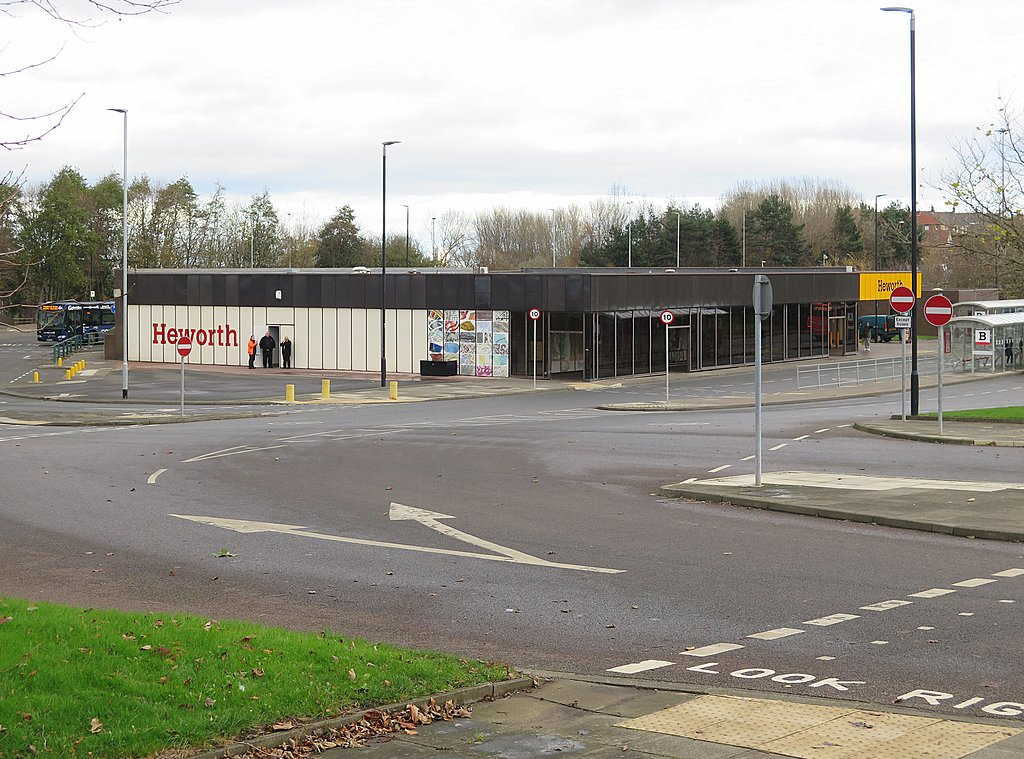
- Heworth Interchange

General information
- Location: Sunderland Road, Heworth NE10; Metropolitan Borough of Gateshead; England
- Coordinates: 54.9515°N 1.5559°W
- OS Grid ref: NZ 285 619
- Owner: Nexus; Network Rail
- Manager: Nexus; Northern
- Transit authority: Nexus
- Platforms: 4 (Metro: 2, National Rail: 2)
- Tracks: 4 (Metro: 2, National Rail: 2)

Construction
- Accessible: Metro: Step-free access throughout, with lifts from street-level to platforms and level-boarding to trains; National Rail: Step-free access to platforms

Other information
- Station code: Metro: HTH; National Rail: HEW

Key dates
- 5 November 1979: National Rail & bus stations opened
- 15 November 1981: Metro station opened

Passengers
- 2020/21: ▼291,584 (Metro)
- 2021/22: ▲1.230 million (Metro)
- 2022/23: ▲1.687 million (Metro)
- 2023/24: ▼1.575 million (Metro)
- 2024/25: ▲1.744 million (Metro)
- 2021/22: ▲27,412 (National Rail)
- 2022/23: ▲29,148 (National Rail)
- 2023/24: ▲45,120 (National Rail)
- 2024/25: ▲45,528 (National Rail)
- 2025/26: ▼44,828 (National Rail)

Services
Preceding station	Tyne and Wear Metro	Following station
Pelaw towards South Hylton	Green line	Felling towards Airport
Pelaw towards South Shields	Yellow line	Felling towards St James via Whitley Bay
Preceding station	National Rail	Following station
Sunderland	Northern Trains Durham Coast Line	Newcastle Central
Location
- Location within Tyne and Wear
Notes
- Metro passenger statistics from Nexus.; National Rail passenger statistics from the Office of Rail and Road.

Heworth Interchange is a multimodal transport hub consisting of a Tyne and Wear Metro station, National Rail station and bus station, as well as a park and ride facility. The interchange serves the suburb of Heworth, Gateshead and surrounding areas in Tyne and Wear, England. The rail and bus stations opened on 5 November 1979, with the Metro station opening two years later on 15 November 1981. The new Heworth rail station took over the role of the former Felling and Pelaw railway stations, which closed on the same day as its opening, to allow them to be converted into Metro stations. The National Rail and Metro routes have separate tracks at this point, but share the same alignment of what was originally the Brandling Junction Railway and now forms part of the Durham Coast Line.

== Metro station ==
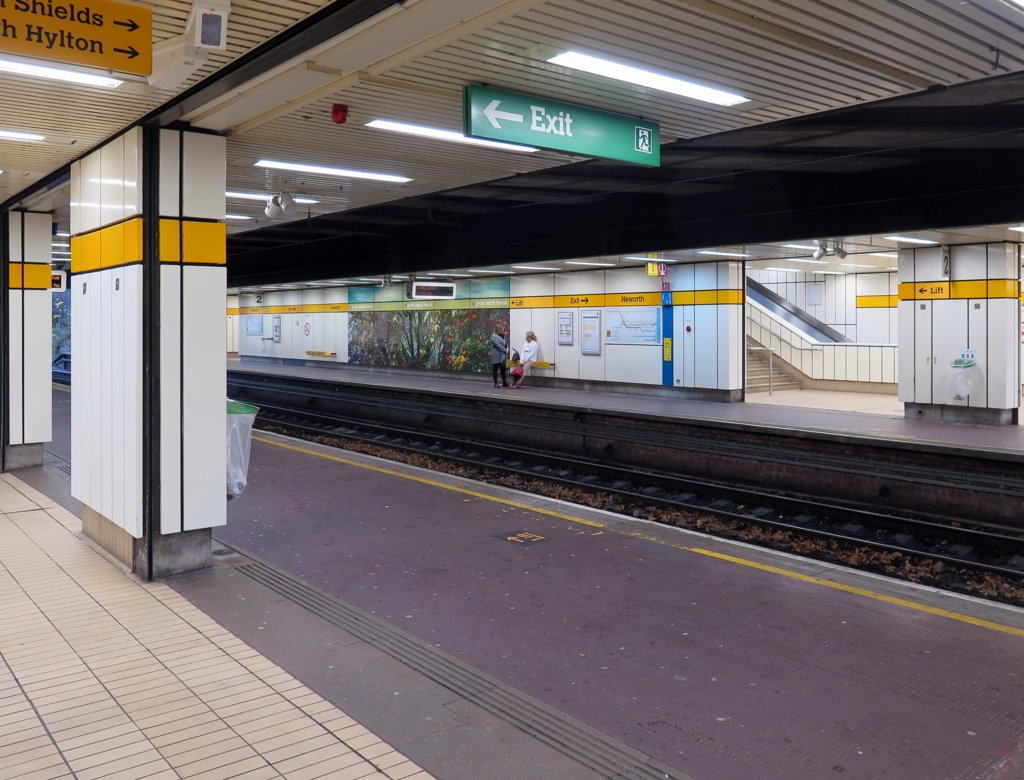
Heworth Metro Station

Heworth Metro Station opened on 15 November 1981, as part of the third phase of the network, between Haymarket and Heworth.

=== History ===
The Tyne and Wear Metro station opened over two years after the adjacent rail station, serving as a replacement for former rail stations at Felling and Pelaw, which were closed on 5 November 1979, ahead of conversion work for the Tyne and Wear Metro network.

Initially, Heworth was a terminus station; trains reversed in the platforms, using the crossovers to the west of the station in passenger service. Later on, reversals took place at the new sidings at Pelaw, once they were completed.

On 24 March 1984, the network was further extended south to South Shields, with the station opening to through services. The following year, on 15 September 1985, Pelaw re-opened as an intermediate station.

=== Facilities ===
Step-free access is available at all stations across the Tyne and Wear Metro network, with two lifts providing step-free access to platforms at Heworth. As part of the Metro: All Change programme, new lifts were installed at Heworth in 2012, with new escalators installed in 2015.

The station is equipped with ticket machines, seating, next train information displays, timetable posters, and an emergency help point on both platforms. The ticket machines accept credit and debit cards (including contactless payment), notes and coins. The station is fitted with automatic ticket barriers, which were installed at 13 stations across the network during the early 2010s, as well as smartcard validators, which feature at all stations.

The station building houses a coffee kiosk, and formerly housed a newsagent's shop in the ticket hall.

The Metro station was used by 1.744 million passengers in 2024/25. slightly lower than the pre-pandemic figure of 1.817 million in 2017/18.

=== Services ===
As of June 2026, the station is served by up to ten trains per hour – five trains in each direction on both of the Yellow and Green lines – on weekdays and Saturdays, and up to eight trains per hour during the evening and on Sundays. In the northbound direction, half the trains run to Newcastle Airport and half to St James via Whitley Bay. In the southbound direction, half the trains run to South Shields and half to South Hylton via Sunderland.

=== Artwork ===
There are two art installations at Heworth. The first, South Tyne Eye Plan (1990) by Mike Clay, is located on the station concourse, and represents the area of Heworth and Felling between 1988 and 1990 in the form of a "continuous unwinding scroll".

The second, Things Made (1990) by Jenny Cowern, is located on the south and west outer walls of the station building, and is made up of 29 large panels, each of which represent industries that have operated in the area, such as coal mining, glass making, textiles and shipbuilding.

== National Rail station ==
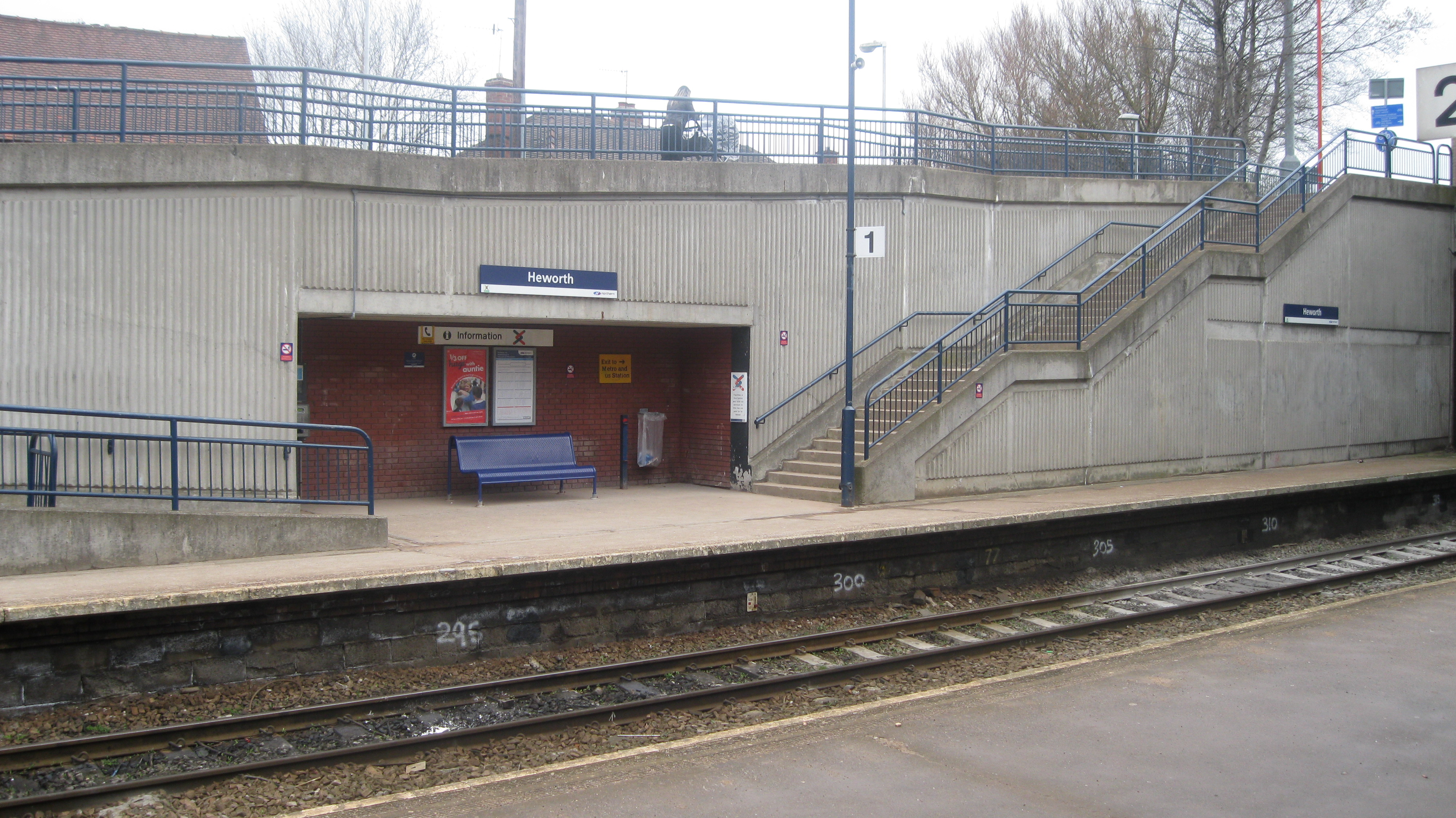
Heworth Railway Station

Heworth is on the Durham Coast Line, which runs between Newcastle Central and Middlesbrough via Hartlepool. The station, situated 2.7 miles (4.4 kilometres) south-east of Newcastle, is owned by Network Rail and managed by Northern Trains.

=== History ===
The station opened on 5 November 1979, replacing the nearby Felling and Pelaw stations, which closed the same day, ahead of their conversion to Tyne and Wear Metro. Before this, passenger trains ran on the southern pair of tracks, which are now used by Metro.

The railway line is part of what was originally the Brandling Junction Railway and now forms part of the Durham Coast Line. Heworth station sits west of Pelaw Junction, where heavy rail and light rail services operate separately. Heading east of the junction, heavy and light rail services share the line, implementing the Karlsruhe model for a distance of 8.2 miles (13 kilometres), as far as Sunderland South Junction.

The National Rail station recorded 45,528 passengers in 2024/2025. This makes it the least used National Rail station in Tyne and Wear.

=== Facilities ===
The station has two platforms, only one of which has a ticket machine (which accepts card or contactless payment only), seating and an emergency help point. Additionally, there is a waiting shelter on the Middlesbrough-bound platform. There is step-free access to both platforms, which are linked by ramp and road bridge.

=== Services ===
As of the May 2026 timetable change, Heworth is served by an hourly service, running between Newcastle Central and Nunthorpe via Middlesbrough, calling at all National Rail stations en route. On Sundays, there is an hourly service between Newcastle Central and Middlesbrough, with a couple of trains extended to/from Nunthorpe or Whitby. All services are operated by Northern.

The December 2025 timetable reshaped regional services, to improve reliability by reducing the number of routes passing through Newcastle. The service between Carlisle and Middlesbrough was increased to run hourly, but now operates as limited-stop on the Durham Coast Line and no longer calls at Heworth. The Nunthorpe to Hexham service was cut back to Newcastle, meaning there is no longer a regular service between Heworth and MetroCentre or other stations on the Tyne Valley Line.

== Bus station ==
Heworth Bus Station opened in November 1979, along with the British Rail station. It is located above the four platforms and bordered by Sunderland Road and the A184. It is served mainly by local Go North East and Nexus-contracted bus services, with frequent buses serving Gateshead, Newcastle upon Tyne, South Tyneside and Washington. It is also served by some regional Go North East buses to Stockton and Middlesbrough.

The bus station has eight departure stands (lettered A–F plus R and X), each of which is fitted with a waiting shelter, seating, next-bus information displays, and timetable posters. It was refurbished in November 2012, at a cost of £200,000.

There are also several bus layover areas.

As of June 2026, the stand allocation is:

Stand	Route	Destination
A	51	Gateshead Interchange via Fewster Square, Wrekenton & Low Fell
A	57	Newcastle Market Street via Fewster Square, Queen Elizabeth Hospital & Gateshead Interchange
A	58	Newcastle Market Street via Fewster Square, Felling Square & Gateshead Interchange
A	58A (Note: Evening journeys only.)	Newcastle Market Street via Fewster Square, Felling Square & Gateshead Interchange
B	52	Gateshead Interchange via Felling Square
B	92	Team Valley Royal Mail via Fewster Square, Wrekenton & Team Valley South End
B	93	Gateshead Interchange via Felling Square, Queen Elizabeth Hospital, Team Valley Retail World & Team Valley North End
B	94	Gateshead Interchange via Gateshead Stadium, Gateshead College & The Glasshouse
B	515	Queen Elizabeth Hospital via Felling Square
C	27	South Shields Interchange via Monkton Lane Estate, Hebburn, Jarrow Interhange & Chichester
C	515	Hebburn via Bill Quay, & Hebburn College
C	568	Lakes Estate Circular via Lakes Estate, Pelaw, Monkton Business Pak (Note: Peak-time journeys only.) & Woods Green
D	57	Wardley via Wardley Lane
D	58A	Wardley via Wardley Lane
D	558	Seaburn Dene Estate via Wardley, Fellgate Estate, East Boldon & Whitburn
D	X10	Middlesbrough express via Dalton Park, Peterlee, Billingham & Stockton
E	4	Houghton-le-Spring via Follingsby Park, Concord, Washington Galleries, Shiney Row & Fence Houses
E	58 (Note: Peak-time and Sunday journeys only.)	Follingsby Park Amazon Warehouse
E	X58	Follingsby Park Amazon Warehouse
F	27	Newcastle Market Street via Felling & Gateshead Interchange
F	X58	Newcastle Market Street express via Gateshead Interchange
F	X10	Newcastle Eldon Square express via Gateshead Interchange
R	Metro replacement bus via Pelaw	
X	Metro replacement bus via Felling	

- Key:
- Bus station
- National Rail station
- Tyne & Wear Metro station

== Shared facilities ==
=== Parking ===
The interchange has a park and ride facility with both short-stay and long-stay car parks. The short-stay car park to the south is a paid facility with a four-hour maximum stay, containing 70 spaces . The long-stay car park to the north is a paid facility with a seven-day maximum stay, containing 390 spaces and four EV charging spaces.

=== Bicycles ===
The station has 25 bicycle stands located in a covered area of the Metro station building.

=== Taxi rank ===
There is a taxi rank located in the bus station.

== Gallery ==
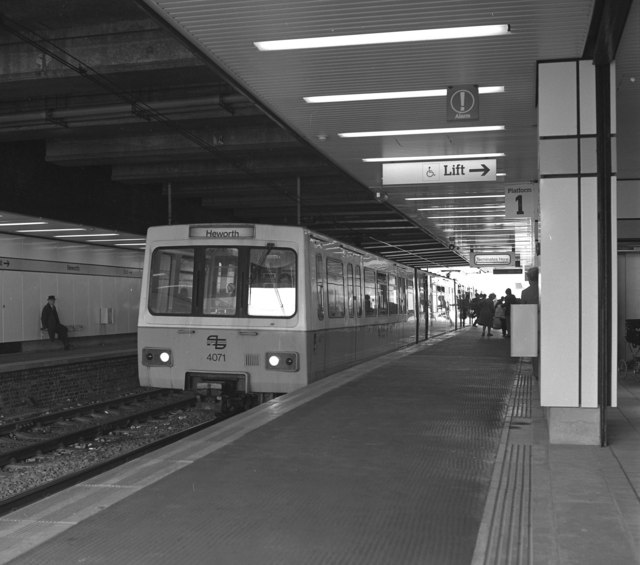
A Metro service terminating at Heworth, seen in May 1983.

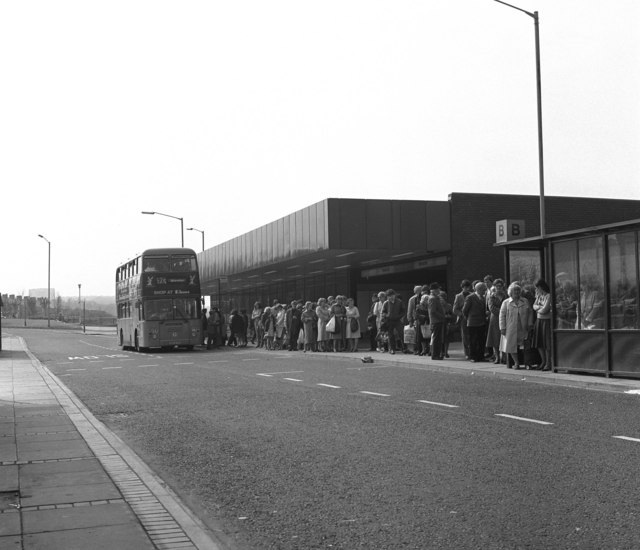
A bus loading passengers at Heworth, seen in May 1983.

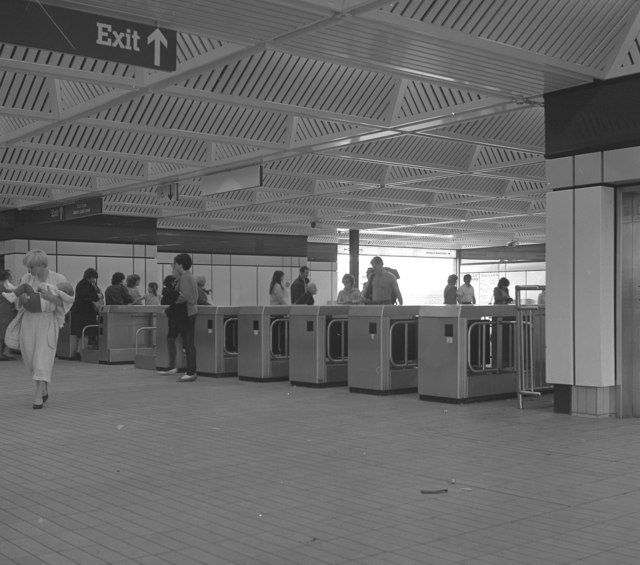
The station concourse and ticket barriers, seen in May 1983.
