= Nexus (transport executive) =

English transport authority

- Tyne and Wear Passenger Transport Executive

Passenger Transport Executive overview
- Formed: 1 April 1974; 52 years ago
- Preceding Passenger Transport Executive: Tyneside PTE
- Jurisdiction: Tyne and Wear
- Headquarters: Nexus House; St James' Boulevard; Newcastle upon Tyne
- Passenger Transport Executive executive: Cathy Massarella, Managing Director
- Parent organisation: North East Combined Authority
- Child agencies: Tyne and Wear Metro; Shields Ferry
- Website: www.nexus.org.uk

Map
- Map showing Tyne & Wear in the UK

The Tyne and Wear Passenger Transport Executive, branded as Nexus, is an executive body of the North East Combined Authority and is best known for owning and operating the Tyne and Wear Metro. It replaced the Tyneside PTE on 1 April 1974.

== Operations ==
=== Overview ===
Nexus is responsible for the following aspects of the Tyne and Wear public transport system:

- owning, operating and maintaining the Tyne and Wear Metro;
- owning, operating and maintaining the Shields Ferry;
- coordinating local bus services;
- contracting and subsidising unprofitable but socially necessary bus services, including school buses;
- subsidising local heavy rail services between Newcastle and Sunderland;
- administering the concessionary travel scheme for older people and eligible disabled adults and children
- subsidising public transport for children aged under 16 and further education students
- providing public transport information;
- maintaining bus stops and most bus stations.
- running Taxicard, a subsidised taxi service for disabled people

=== Concession ===
Between 2010 and 2017, the Tyne and Wear Metro was operated under contract by DB Regio on behalf of Nexus.

During November 2008, Nexus invited potential bidders to declare an interest in a contract to run the operations side of the Metro on its behalf. The successful bidder was to obtain a seven-year contract commencing on 1 April 2010, with up to an additional two years depending on performance. In February 2009, four bids were shortlisted: DB Regio, MTR Corporation, Serco/Abellio, and an in-house bid from Nexus. By October 2009, the shortlist had been reduced to bids from DB Regio and Nexus.

In December 2009, DB Regio was named as the preferred bidder, with the contract for operating the system signed in February 2010, and the handover of the service taking place in April 2010. In February 2010, the government confirmed it would award Nexus up to £580 million to modernise and operate the Tyne and Wear Metro, with up to £350 million to be spent on the Metro: All Change programme, over the course of the following eleven years; a further £230 million would support running and maintenance costs, over the following nine years.

In March 2016, Nexus announced that they did not intend to renew the contract with DB Regio, following the contract ending in 2017, after stating that they were dissatisfied with the operator due to missed performance targets. During April 2017, Nexus took over direct operation of Metro for a planned period of two years; at the time, it announced its intention to re-tender the contract at some future date.

== Policies and programmes ==
Nexus is pursuing a number of major programmes aimed at improving public transport in Tyne and Wear. These include the £389 million "Metro: All Change" programme to modernise the Tyne and Wear Metro over eleven years. Most of the capital money will be invested in renewal and upgrade of infrastructure, with modernisation of stations and trains also included. Trains will not be replaced within this programme, but are expected to be replaced in around 2023.

In April 2009, Nexus launched a Bus Strategy aimed at improving the bus network in Tyne and Wear, which accounts for around 77% of all public transport journeys in the area. Nexus said it wished to work in partnership with commercial bus companies which operate 90% of services in Tyne and Wear. Priorities include increasing the punctuality and reliability of bus services, improving information and ensuring the network offers a high level of access to local shops, services and workplaces. In October 2014, the North East Combined Authority accepted a recommendation from Nexus to take forward a Quality Contracts Scheme as the best means of meeting this objective.

Nexus seeks to reduce social exclusion, particularly for disabled people, through a number of overlapping schemes. These include subsidised taxis, weekly community bus services between sheltered accommodation and supermarkets, a "companion card" allowing free use of public transport by caretakers, and specialist training and mentoring for people with learning difficulties.

== Smart ticketing ==
Nexus has led one of the UK's biggest roll-outs of smart ticketing technology, in partnership with local councils and commercial transport companies as part of the North East Smart Ticketing Initiative (NESTI). NESTI aims to deliver a single smart infrastructure for North East England, making it possible to travel on public transport with a single smart payment card. Nexus has itself launched the Pop brand, which encompasses a number of smartcards including Pop cards for season tickets, Pop Pay As You Go cards and Under 16 Pop cards which facilitate concessionary travel by young people in Tyne and Wear. Pop branded smartcards are accepted and are commonplace on Nexus' services, while the Pop PAYG card is accepted on a range of public transport across North East England.

Nexus have also introduced Pop PAYG for Google Pay, allowing users with Android smartphones to use Google Pay instead of a physical Pop card. However, existing cards are unable to be added, requiring a new card be created via the App.

== TravelShops ==
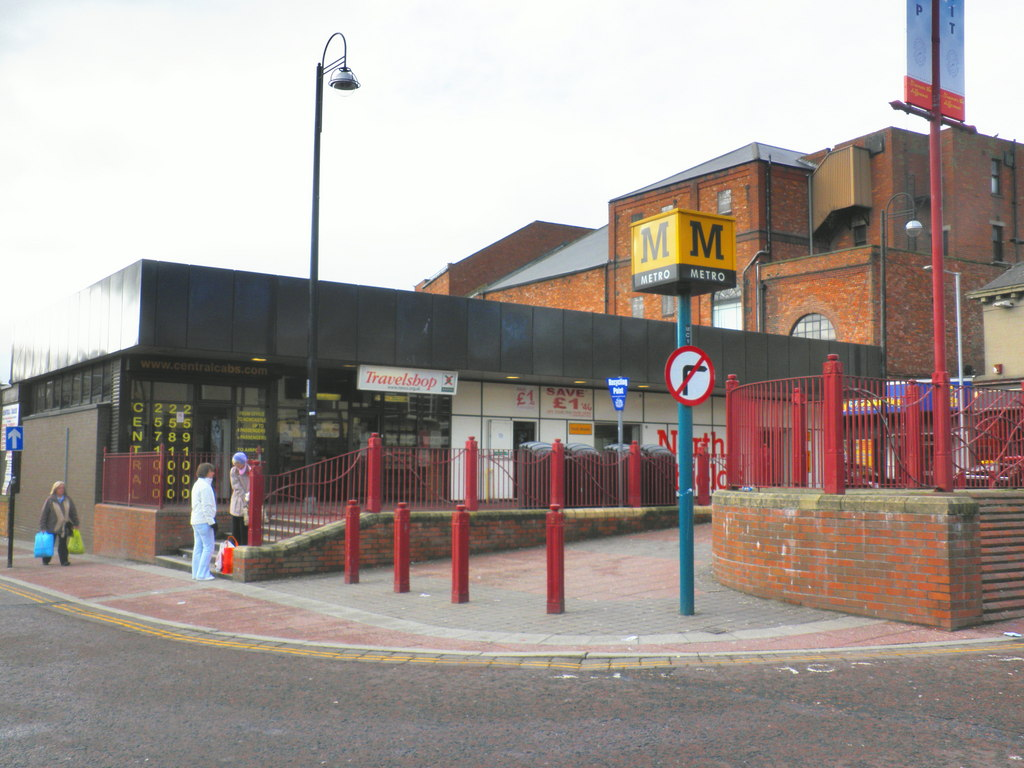
North Shields Metro station and Travelshop

Nexus operated seven TravelShops which sold tickets and provided local public transport information. These were located at:

- Central Station Metro station, Newcastle
- Gateshead Interchange
- Haymarket Metro station, Newcastle
- Monument Metro station, Newcastle
- North Shields Metro station
- Park Lane Interchange, Sunderland
- South Shields Interchange

The Monument station TravelShop closed in 2015. All of the remaining TravelShops were closed in 2020, following the coronavirus outbreak, with staff being redeployed to assist at bus and Metro stations.
