= South Shields Interchange =

Tyne and Wear Metro and bus interchange in South Tyneside

South Shields
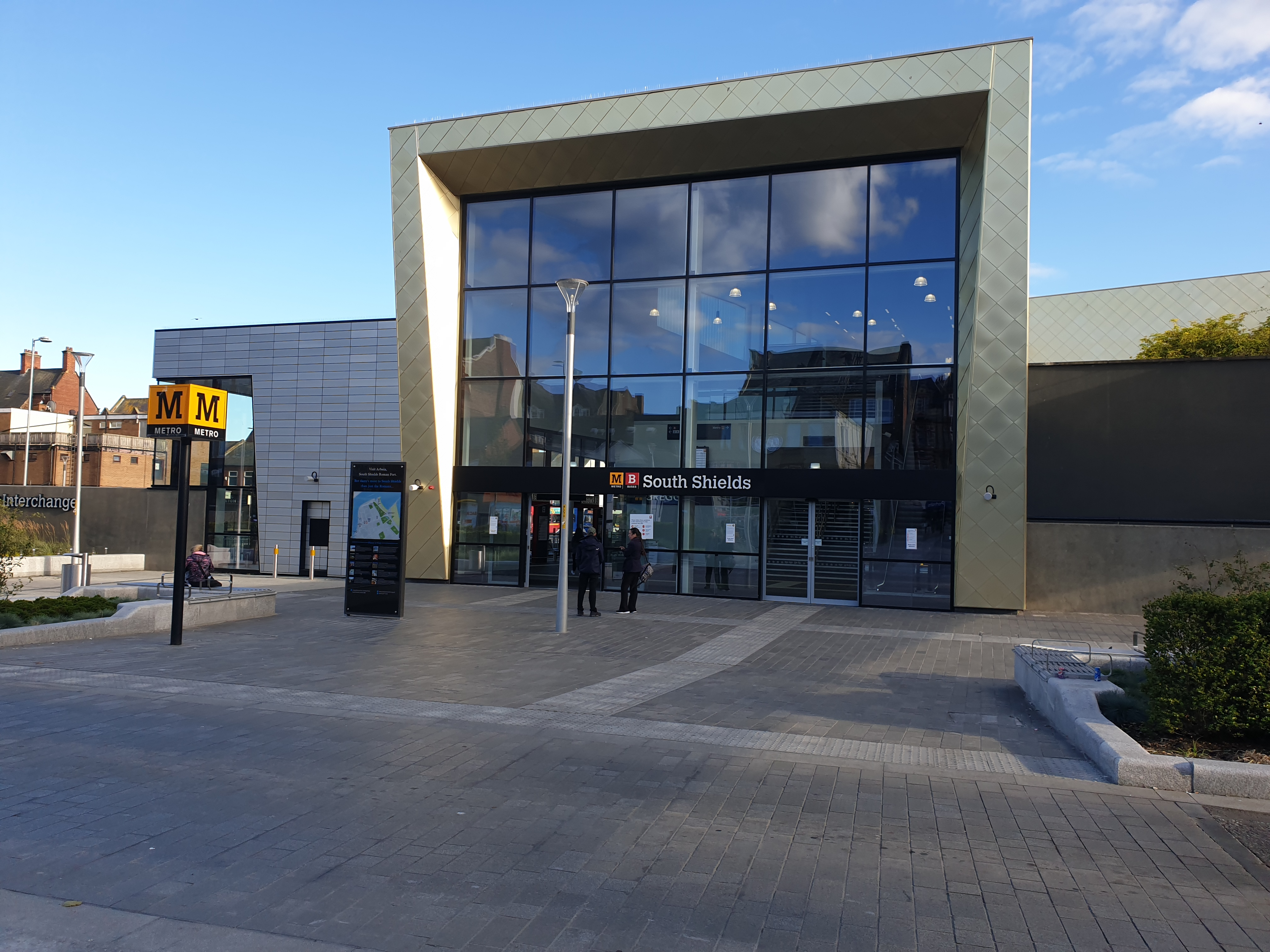

General information
- Location: South Shields, South Tyneside; England
- Coordinates: 54°59′50″N 1°25′59″W
- Grid reference: NZ325651
- System: Tyne and Wear Metro station
- Transit authority: Tyne and Wear PTE
- Platforms: 1
- Tracks: 1
- Bus stands: 15

Construction
- Cycle facilities: 4 cycle lockers
- Accessible: Step-free access to platform

Other information
- Fare zone: C

History
- Original company: North Eastern Railway
- Pre-grouping: North Eastern Railway
- Post-grouping: London and North Eastern Railway; British Rail (Eastern Region)

Key dates
- 2 June 1879: Opened
- 1 June 1981: Closed for conversion
- 24 March 1984: Resited and reopened
- 8 July 2019: Closed
- 4 August 2019: Resited and reopened

Passengers
- 2024/25: 1.532 million

Services
Preceding station	Tyne and Wear Metro	Following station
Terminus	Yellow line	Chichester towards St James via Whitley Bay
Location
- Location within Tyne and Wear
Notes
- Connection with the Shields Ferry ( 480m).

South Shields Interchange is Tyne and Wear Passenger Transport Executive's transport hub in the coastal town of South Shields, South Tyneside in Tyne and Wear, England.

== History ==
The station, which was originally located on Mile End Road, was opened on 2 June 1879 by the North Eastern Railway; it later became a part of the Tyneside Electrics railway network. It closed in June 1981, for conversion to part of the Tyne and Wear Metro system.

Conversion work saw the station relocated about 200 m (660 ft) up the line from the former British Rail station, with the construction of a new facility on a bridge over King Street. The original Grade II listed station building, located near to Mile End Road, remained following conversion but was demolished in the late 1990s after falling into disrepair.

It joined the network as a terminus station on 24 March 1984, following the opening of the fifth phase of the network between Heworth and South Shields.

The original Metro station was closed on 8 July 2019 and was resited around 100 m (330 ft) to the south-east. On 4 August 2019, the station reopened as part of the new South Shields Interchange.

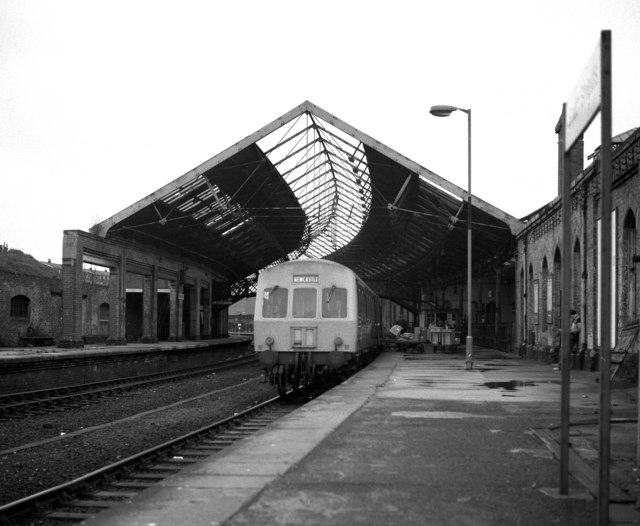
A Class 101 DMU at the original North Eastern Railway station, photographed in August 1977, around four years prior to the station's closure.

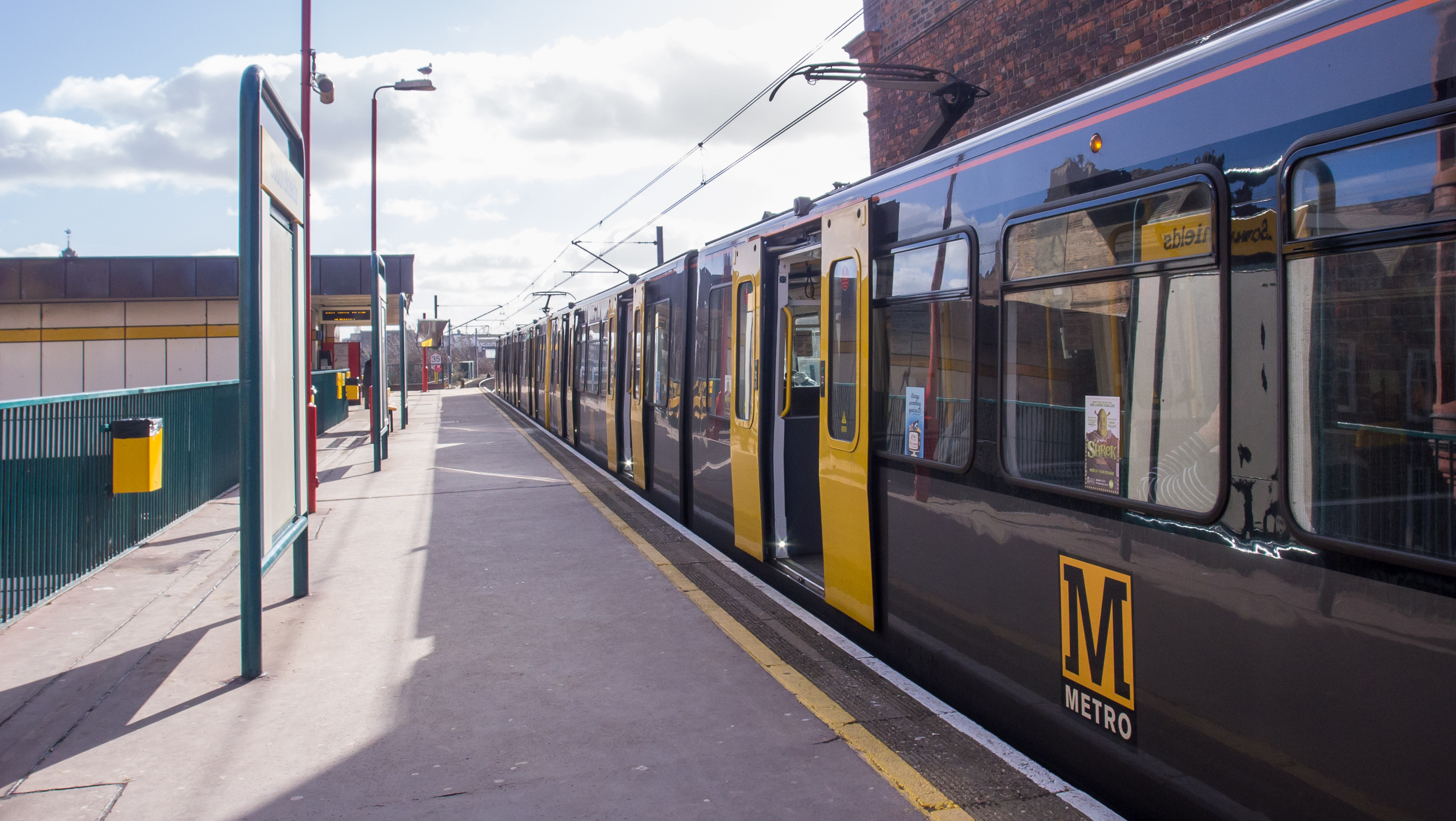
A Class 599 Metrocar at the original Tyne and Wear Metro station, photographed in February 2015.

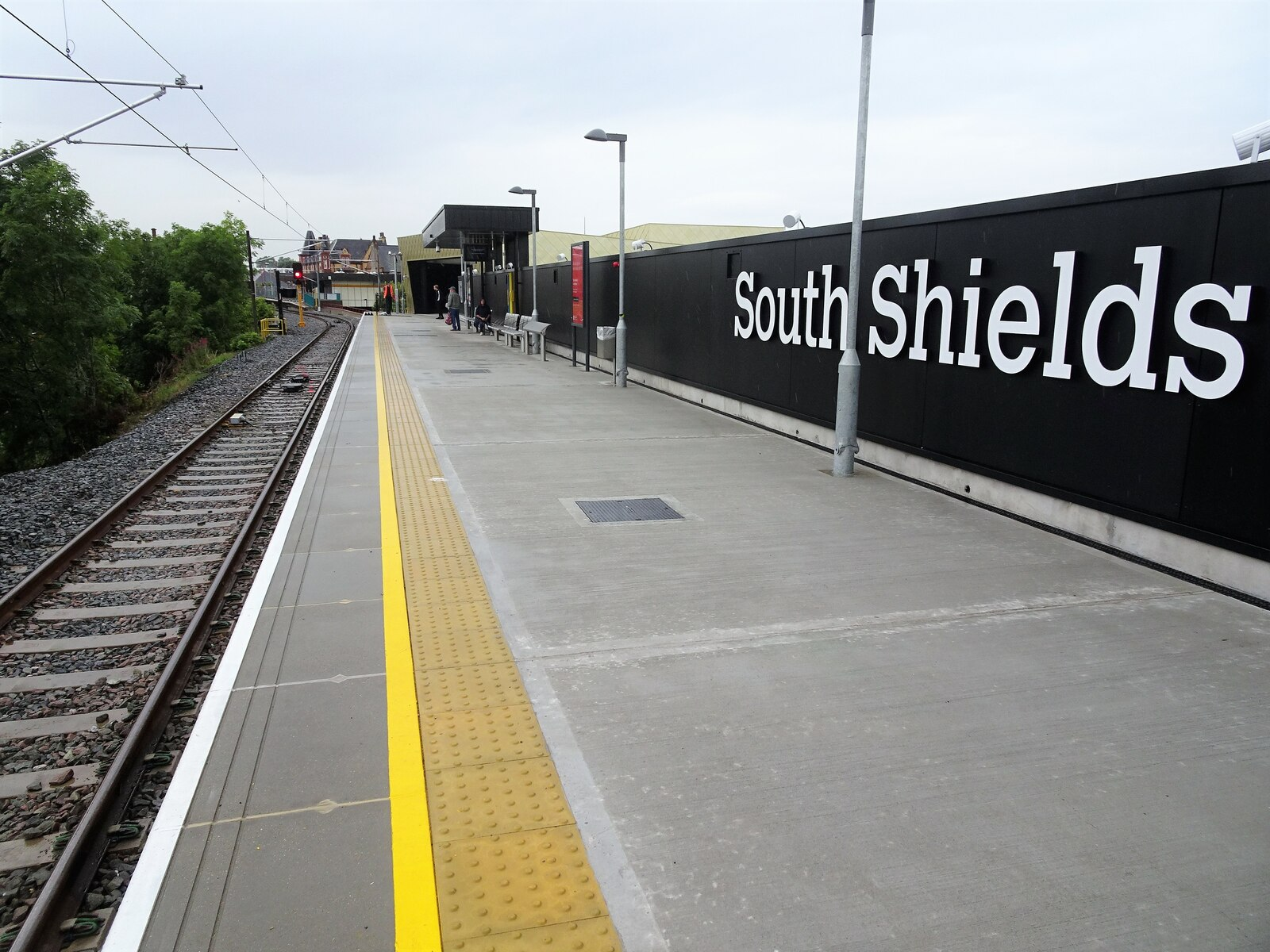
The current (resited) Metro station, photographed in August 2019, shortly after reopening.

== Maintenance and Renewals Skills Centre ==
In July 2018, Tyne and Wear Passenger Transport Executive announced an £8.4 million project to construct a Maintenance and Renewals Skills Centre. The three-storey building, which houses a training hub, as well as stabling facilities for up to two trains, opened in September 2020.

== Facilities ==
Step-free access is available at all stations across the Tyne and Wear Metro network, with two lifts providing step-free access to platforms at South Shields. The station is equipped with ticket machines, sheltered waiting area, seating, next train information displays, timetable posters, and an emergency help point. Ticket machines are able to accept payment with credit and debit card (including contactless payment), notes and coins. The station is fitted with automatic ticket barriers, which were installed at 13 stations across the network during the early 2010s, as well as smartcard validators, which feature at all stations. The station houses a Greggs outlet as well as a now disused Nexus TravelShop, both of which are located within the bus concourse.

The large bus interchange is located on the lower level, providing frequent connections throughout the local Tyne and Wear area as well as a half-hourly service reaching Durham. The bus station has 14 departure stands (lettered A–P), with an additional stand used by long-distance coach services. Each stand is fitted with seating, next bus information displays, and timetable posters. There is also a taxi rank located just outside the main Keppel Street entrance and secure cycle lockers at the south entrance.

== Tyne and Wear Metro services ==
The station is the eastern terminus of the Yellow line; services run to St James, via Newcastle Central and Whitley Bay. There are up to five trains per hour on weekdays and Saturdays, with up to four trains per hour during evenings and on Sundays.

== Bus services ==
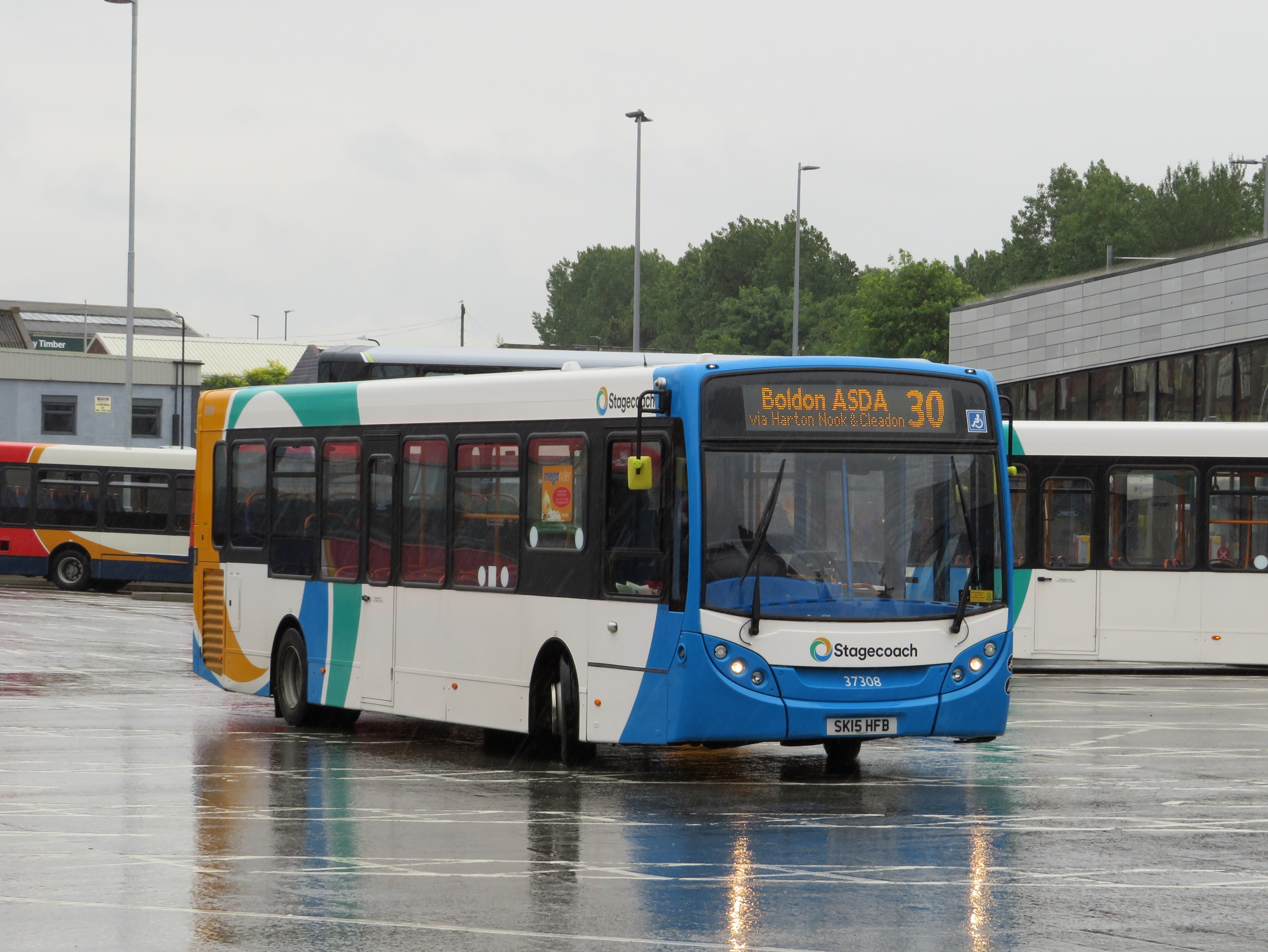
Stagecoach North East service 30 leaving South Shields Interchange

Bus services that call at South Shields Interchange are operated by Go North East and Stagecoach North East. Routes link the town with Sunderland, Gateshead, Newcastle upon Tyne and locations in South Tyneside and County Durham.
