= Shiremoor Metro station =

Tyne and Wear Metro station in North Tyneside

Shiremoor
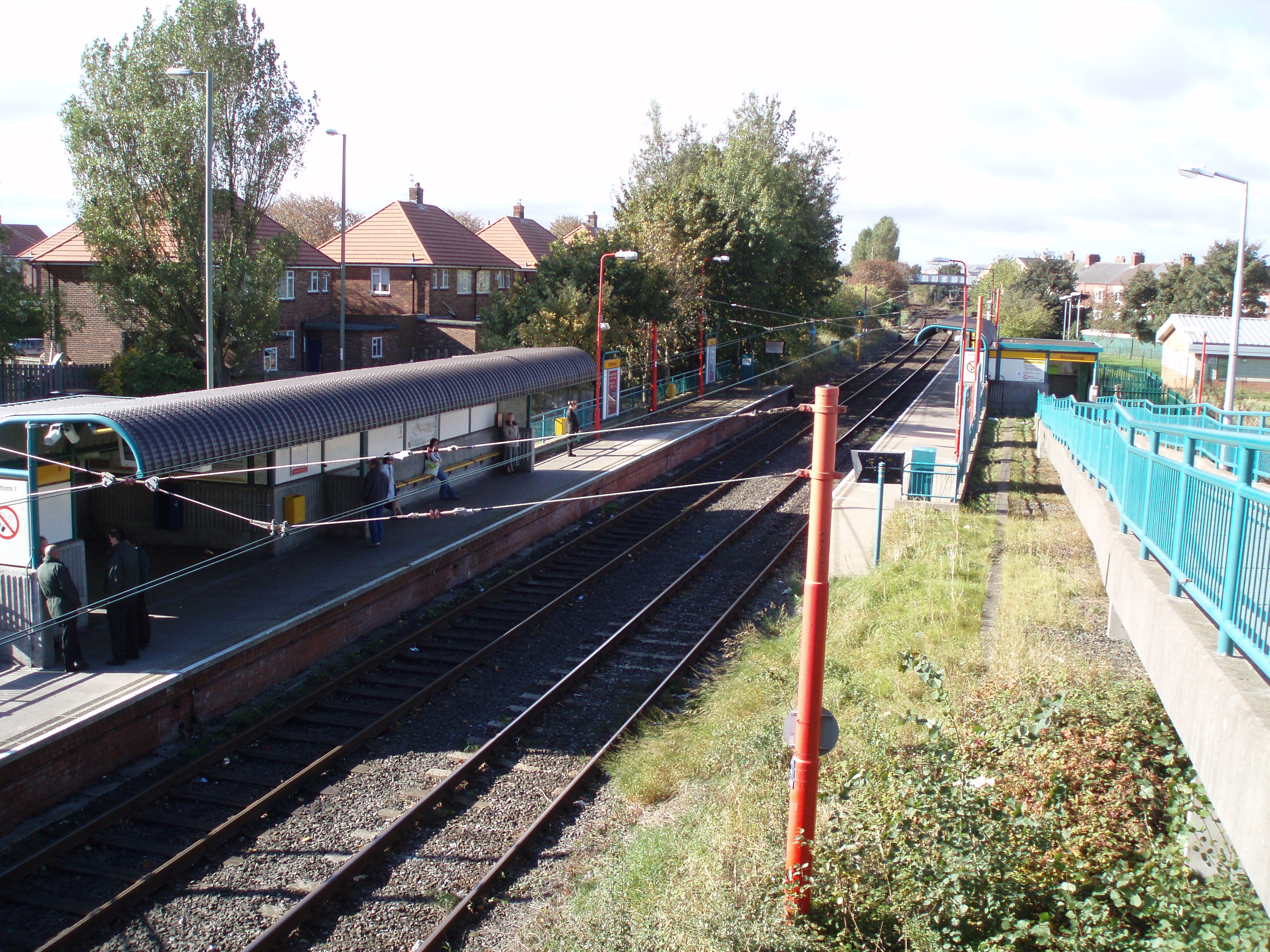

General information
- Location: Shiremoor, North Tyneside; England
- Coordinates: 55°02′13″N 1°30′20″W
- Grid reference: NZ317714
- System: Tyne and Wear Metro station
- Transit authority: Tyne and Wear PTE
- Platforms: 2
- Tracks: 2

Construction
- Parking: 20 spaces
- Cycle facilities: 4 cycle pods
- Accessible: Step-free access to platform

Other information
- Station code: SMR
- Fare zone: B and C

History
- Original company: Tyne and Wear Metro

Key dates
- 11 August 1980: Opened

Passengers
- 2024/25: 0.527 million

Services
Preceding station	Tyne and Wear Metro	Following station
Northumberland Park towards South Shields	Yellow line	West Monkseaton towards St James via Whitley Bay
Location
- Location within Tyne and Wear

Shiremoor is a Tyne and Wear Metro station, serving the village of Shiremoor, North Tyneside in Tyne and Wear, England. It opened in 1980, following the opening of the first phase of the metro, between Haymarket and Tynemouth via Four Lane Ends.

== History ==
The station is located on the alignment of the former Blyth and Tyne Railway line from Newcastle New Bridge Street to Tynemouth. The station was opened on 11 August 1980, as a replacement for the former Backworth station, which was some 800 metres (2,600 ft) to the west and was closed to passengers in June 1977 in preparation for the conversion of the line to the Tyne and Wear Metro.

Unlike neighbouring West Monkseaton to the east, which is a converted British Rail station, Shiremoor was purpose-built for the Tyne and Wear Metro. At the time it was opened, the next metro station to the west was Benton, but the gap between the two has since been filled by the successive openings of Palmersville (in 1986) and Northumberland Park (in 2005).

== Facilities ==
Shiremoor station has two slightly staggered side platforms with separate entrances, and is crossed by the Park Lane road bridge. The northern (eastbound) platform is accessed by a ramp from Park Lane, or by a footpath from the nearby medical centre. The southern (westbound) platform is accessed by steps or an indirect step-free route from Park Lane, or by a footpath from Etal Crescent.

The station is equipped with ticket machines, waiting shelter, seating, next train information displays, timetable posters, and an emergency help point on both platforms. Ticket machines are able to accept payment with credit and debit card (including contactless payment), notes and coins. The station is also fitted with smartcard validators, which feature at all stations across the network.

There is a small free car park available at the station, with 19 unclassified spaces and one designated accessible parking bay. There is also the provision for cycle parking, with four cycle pods available for use. Both are adjacent to the southern (westbound) platform.

== Services ==
As of October 2024, the station is served by up to five trains per hour on weekdays and Saturday, and up to four trains per hour during the evening and on Sunday. In the eastbound direction, trains run to St James via Whitley Bay. In the westbound direction, trains run to South Shields via Monument. Additional services previously operated between Pelaw and Monkseaton at peak times, but have recently been withdrawn, as a result of poor fleet availability.
