= Northumberland Park station (Tyne and Wear) =

Transport interchange in Tyne and Wear

Northumberland Park
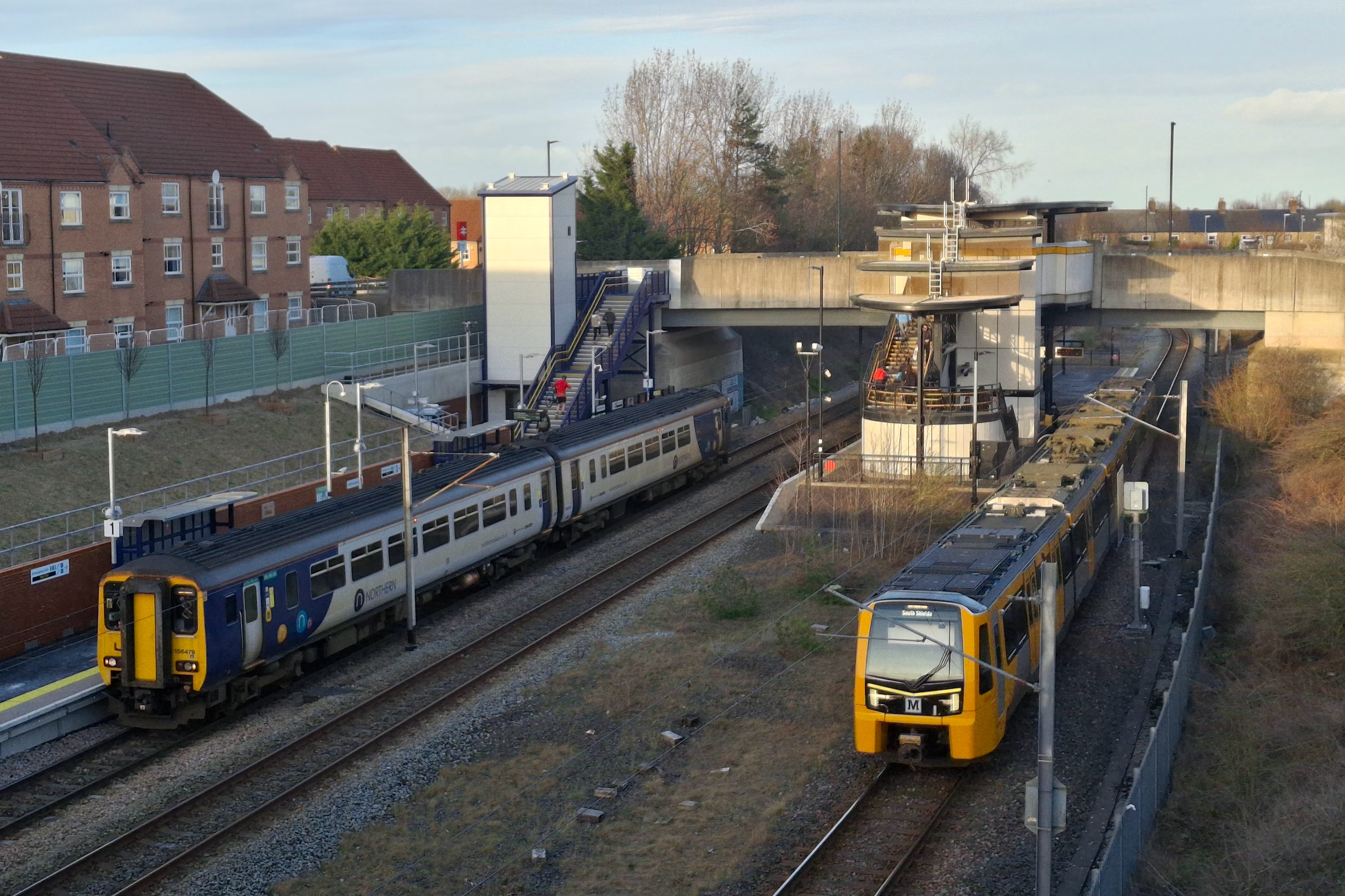
- A Northern Class 156 and a Metro Class 555 at Northumberland Park

General information
- Location: Northumberland Park, NE27; North Tyneside; England
- Coordinates: 55.0330°N 1.5200°W
- OS Grid ref: NZ 308 710
- System: Multimodal transport hub including Tyne and Wear Metro and National Rail stations
- Owner: Nexus; Network Rail
- Manager: Nexus; Northern Trains
- Transit authority: Nexus
- Lines: Yellow line; Northumberland line
- Platforms: 3 (Metro: 2, National Rail: 1)
- Tracks: 3 (Metro: 2, National Rail: 1)
- Bus stands: 2 stops, 3 unused parking bays

Construction
- Accessible: Step-free access, with lifts from street-level to platforms; Metro: also level-boarding to trains

Other information
- Station code: Metro: NPK; National Rail: NOP

Key dates
- 11 December 2005: Metro station opened
- 22 February 2026: National Rail station opened

Passengers
- 2020/21: ▼129,310 (Tyne and Wear Metro)
- 2021/22: ▲451,926 (Tyne and Wear Metro)
- 2022/23: ▲591,273 (Tyne and Wear Metro)
- 2023/24: ▲618,656 (Tyne and Wear Metro)
- 2024/25: ▼588,318 (Tyne and Wear Metro)
- 2025/26: ▲11,912 (National Rail)

Services
| Preceding station | Tyne and Wear Metro | Following station |
|---|---|---|
| Palmersville towards South Shields | Yellow line | Shiremoor towards St James via Whitley Bay |
| Preceding station | National Rail | Following station |
| Manors | Northern Trains Northumberland Line | Seaton Delaval |
Location
- Location within Tyne and Wear
Notes
- Metro passenger statistics from Nexus. National Rail passenger statistics from the Office of Rail and Road.

Northumberland Park is a multimodal transport hub with both a Tyne and Wear Metro station and a National Rail station, serving the village of Backworth and suburbs of Northumberland Park and West Allotment, as well as the nearby Cobalt Business Park, North Tyneside in Tyne and Wear, England.

The Metro station opened on 11 December 2005, on the alignment of the former Blyth and Tyne Railway. A Network Rail line – which was freight-only between 1964 and 2024 – shares the alignment at this point. The National Rail station opened on 22 February 2026 as part of the Northumberland Line, creating a new interchange with the Metro network.

The station entrance is on Algernon Drive, with stairs and lifts providing access to both Metro and National Rail platforms.

The Northumberland line has been integrated into the Metro's fare system, allowing passengers to make through Metro/rail journeys using a Nexus Pop smartcard.

== History ==
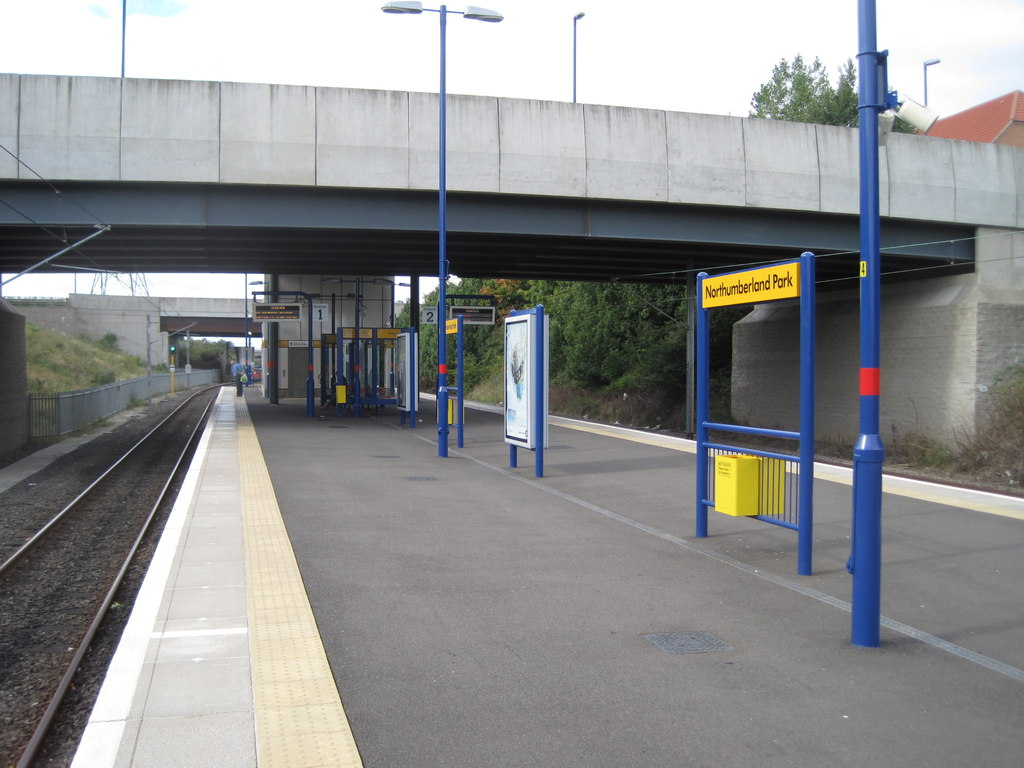
Northumberland Park Metro station

The interchange is located west of the site of the former railway station at Backworth, which was closed on 13 June 1977, to enable construction of the Tyne and Wear Metro. When the Metro opened in 1980, no station was provided at or near the former Backworth station site, and Shiremoor was the nearest Metro station.

== Metro station ==
The station was used by 588,318 passengers in 2024/25. considerably lower than the pre-pandemic figure of 779,043 in 2017/18.

=== Facilities ===
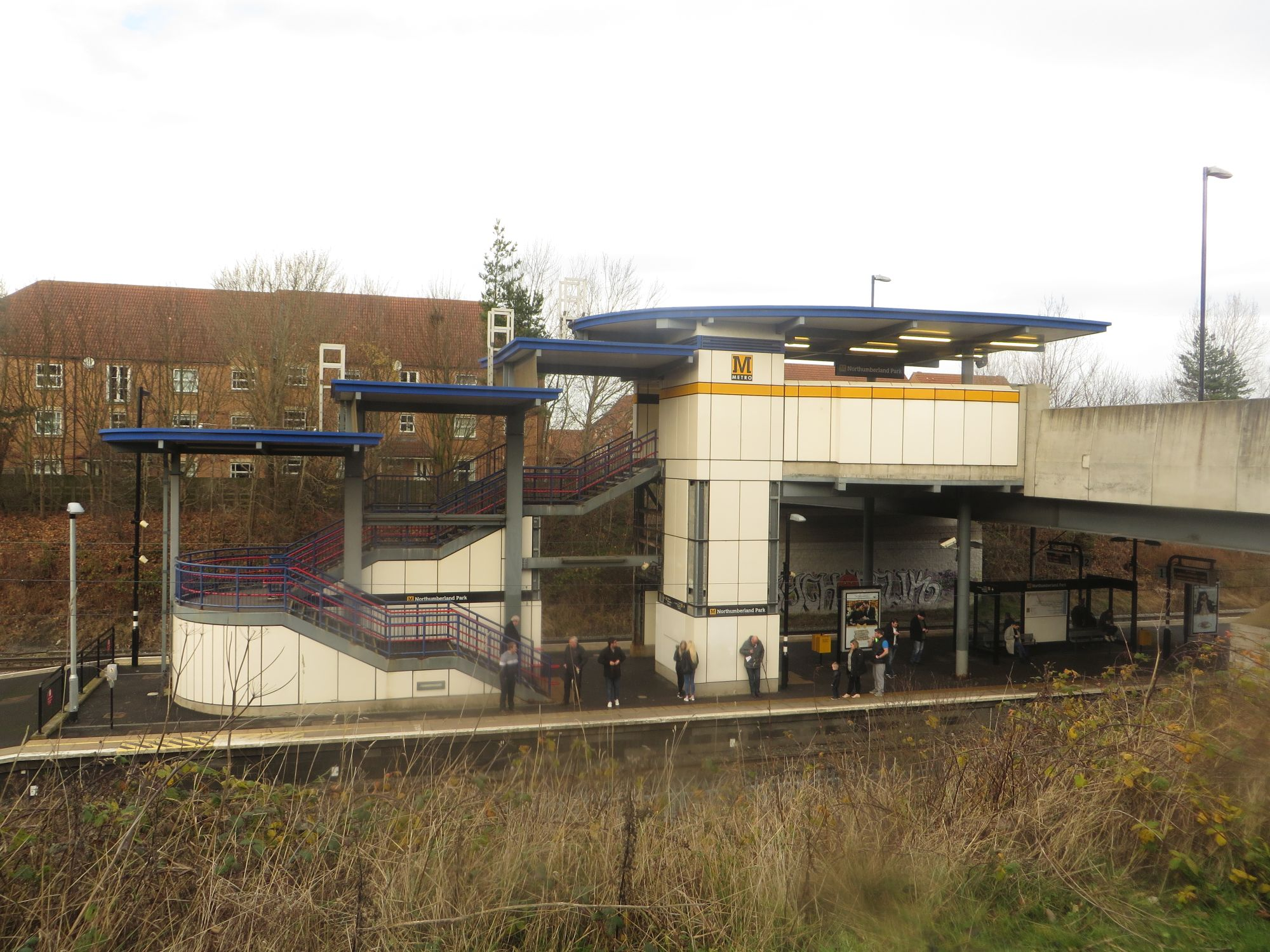
Station entrance, showing stairs and lift to Metro platforms.

The station has an island platform between the twin Metro tracks and is the only through island platform outside of the core section.

The station is equipped with ticket machines, a sheltered waiting area, seating, next train information displays, timetable posters, and an emergency help point. Ticket machines are able to accept payment with credit and debit cards (including contactless payment), notes and coins. The station is also fitted with smartcard validators, which are featured at all stations across the network.

=== Services ===
As of May 2026, the station is served by up to five trains per hour – in each direction – on weekdays and Saturdays, and up to four trains per hour during the evening and on Sundays. In the eastbound direction, trains run to St James via Whitley Bay. In the westbound direction, trains run to South Shields via Monument. Additional services previously operated between Pelaw and Monkseaton at peak times, but have recently been withdrawn, as a result of poor fleet availability.

== National Rail station ==
=== History ===
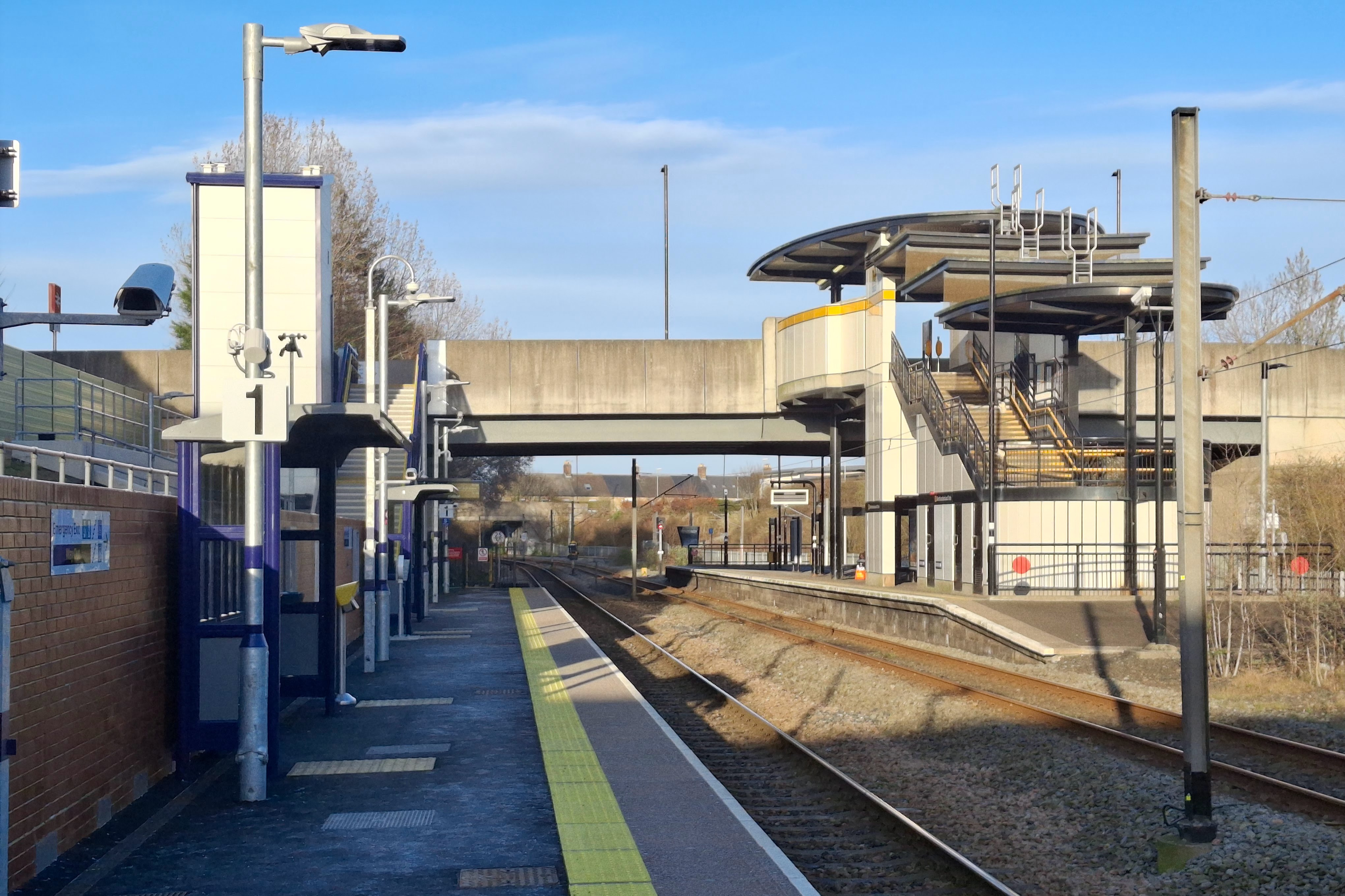
Northumberland Park Rail station

From December 2024, passenger rail services were introduced between Newcastle and Ashington, as part of the Northumberland Line project. The passenger service uses the existing single-track freight line which parallels the Tyne and Wear Metro line between Benton Junction and the site of Backworth Junction, to the east of Northumberland Park station.

A planning application for the new National Rail station was submitted to North Tyneside Council on 2 February 2021. The submitted planning documents indicate that the station will have a single platform, located on the north side of Network Rail track, which is designed to accommodate a four-car train. It will be provided with two waiting shelters and will be accessed from Algernon Drive via stairs and a lift. Approval for the new station was granted on 17 September 2021.

Northumberland Park's new National Rail station was constructed by the project's primary contractor, Morgan Sindall. The main construction phase began in 2022. The station opened on 22 February 2026, with passenger services having commenced on the line in December 2024, with trains passing through Northumberland Park without stopping until its opening.

=== Facilities ===
The station has a single platform for the single National Rail track passing through the station.

The station is equipped with a ticket machine, sheltered waiting areas, seating, next train information displays, and an emergency help point. Ticket machines are able to accept payment with credit and debit card (including contactless payment), and will print 'promise to pay' tickets for cash users. The station is also fitted with smartcard validators, which are featured at all stations on the Northumberland Line.

=== Services ===
As of May 2026, the station is served by two trains per hour – in each direction – on weekdays and Saturdays, and hourly during the evening and on Sundays. The end-to-end journey time between Newcastle Central and Ashington is around 35 minutes. All services are operated by Northern Trains.

== Shared facilities ==
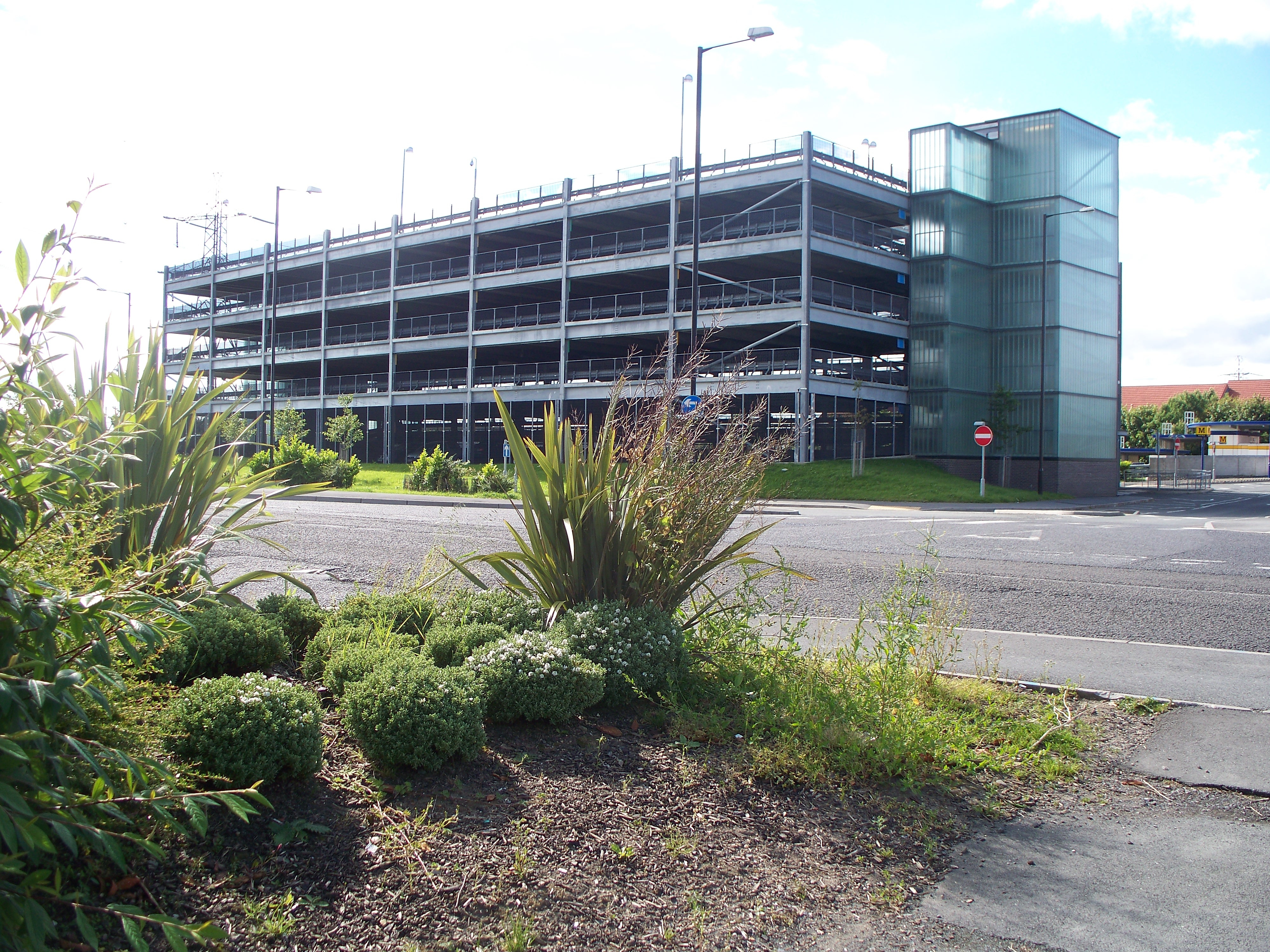
The station car park

The interchange serves as a park and ride with a multi-storey car park which has 393 spaces, plus 12 accessible spaces. There is also provision for cycle parking, with five cycle pods.

A small bus interchange with two stands is located at the station, which are served primarily by the 19 bus - providing onward connections in and around North Tyneside and south east Northumberland, Three more bus stops are located within walking distance.. There is also a small taxi rank located next to the bus stops.

== Sources ==
- "Connecting Communities – Expanding Access to the Rail Network" (PDF). London: Association of Train Operating Companies. June 2009.
