= West Monkseaton Metro station =

Tyne and Wear Metro station in North Tyneside

West Monkseaton
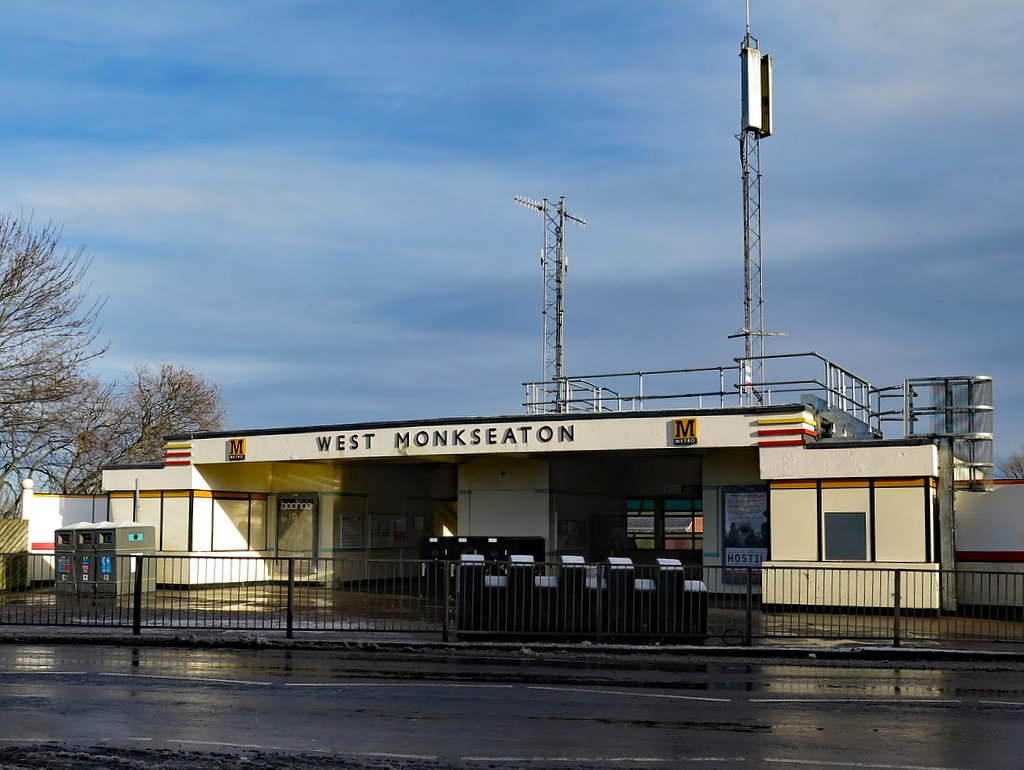

General information
- Location: Monkseaton, North Tyneside; England
- Coordinates: 55°02′26″N 1°28′34″W
- Grid reference: NZ336719
- System: Tyne and Wear Metro station
- Transit authority: Tyne and Wear PTE
- Platforms: 2
- Tracks: 2

Construction
- Cycle facilities: 3 cycle lockers; 5 cycle pods
- Accessible: Step-free access to platform

Other information
- Station code: WMN
- Fare zone: C

History
- Original company: London and North Eastern Railway
- Post-grouping: London and North Eastern Railway; British Rail (Eastern Region)

Key dates
- 20 March 1933: Opened
- 10 September 1979: Closed for conversion
- 11 August 1980: Reopened

Passengers
- 2024/25: 0.585 million

Services
Preceding station	Tyne and Wear Metro	Following station
Shiremoor towards South Shields	Yellow line	Monkseaton towards St James via Whitley Bay
Location
- Location within Tyne and Wear

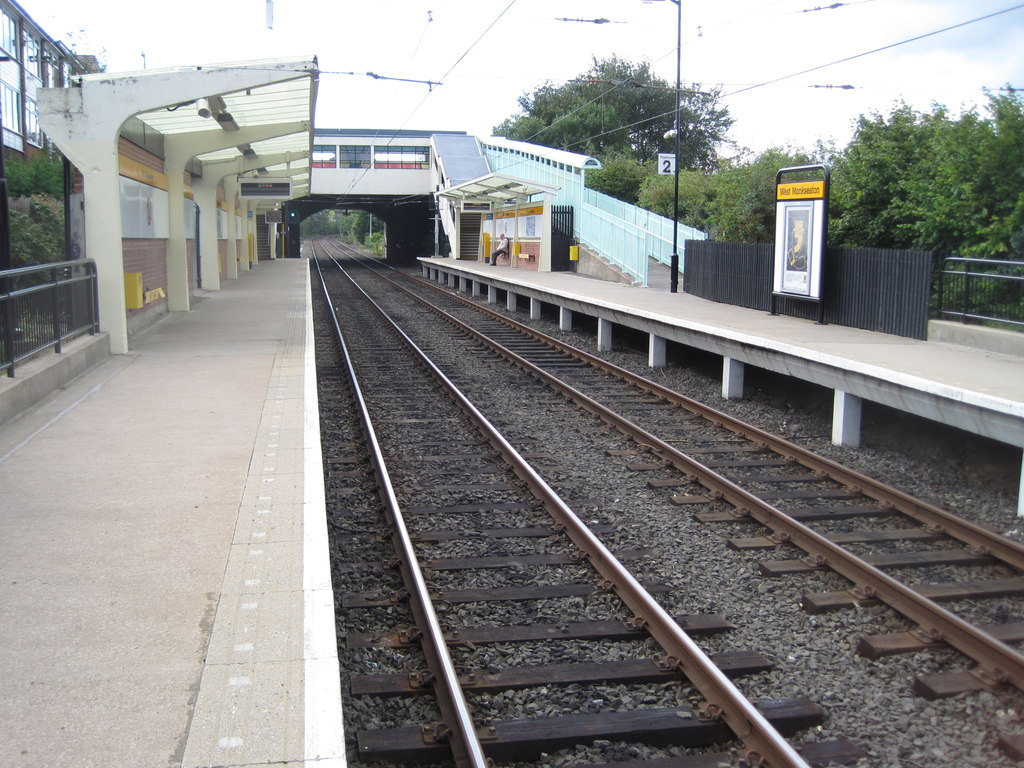
The station platforms and canopies

West Monkseaton is a Tyne and Wear Metro station, and former British Rail station, serving the suburb of Monkseaton in North Tyneside, Tyne and Wear, England. It was opened in 1933, closed in 1979 for conversion to become part of the Tyne and Wear Metro, and joined that network in 1980.

The station is a rare example of the Art Deco style applied to a railway station in the United Kingdom. The station building has curved flanking entrance bays and a flat roof, whilst the metal framed windows provide a horizontal emphasis based on the glazing bars. It is variously attributed to the LNER architect, H. H. Powell, and to Oliver Hill, the architect of the Midland Hotel in Morecambe.

== History ==
West Monkseaton station is located on the alignment of the former Blyth and Tyne Railway line from Newcastle New Bridge Street to Tynemouth. Monkseaton had been served by Monkseaton station since that line opened in 1864. However, the development of new housing in the area adjoining the line led the London and North Eastern Railway (LNER) to construct an additional station, some 3/4 mile (1.2 km) to the west.

The station's wooden platforms took just a month to build after plans were approved, and the station opened in March 1933. Work on the station building, however, did not begin until 1934. The reinforced concrete station building straddled the station, whilst staircases and ramps led down from this building to the platforms, which featured waiting rooms. The westbound platform featured a concrete canopy, which was added following the construction of the waiting rooms.

Prior to the station's closure, for conversion to become part of the Tyne and Wear Metro network, the station generally received a service every 20 minutes in both directions on the Coast Circle route. The service from West Monkseaton to Newcastle via South Gosforth ended on 23 January 1978, in order to facilitate conversion work on the stations to the west. This meant that the station was briefly a terminus for trains from Newcastle via Tynemouth, with trains reversing using a crossover to the west of the station.

The station itself closed for conversion on 10 September 1979, re-opening as part of the Tyne and Wear Metro on 11 August 1980, along with the rest of the first phase of the network, between Haymarket and Tynemouth. Conversion work saw the loss of the platform waiting rooms, as well as the replacement of the timber platforms with shorter concrete ones. The canopy on the westbound platform was retained, while a smaller canopy in a similar style was added to the eastbound platform.

The original street-level entrance building remains, and was refurbished in 1999, along with the original LNER platform canopy. As part of this refurbishment, an art installation by Richard Talbot, Bridge, was commissioned. It features a number of coloured stained glass windows, and is located in the station's ticket hall, overlooking the track and platforms.

West Monkseaton was again refurbished, along with Cullercoats and Monkseaton, in 2018, as part of the Metro: All Change programme. The refurbishment involved the installation of new seating and lighting, resurfaced platforms, and improved security and accessibility. The station was also painted in to the new black and white corporate colour scheme.

== Facilities ==
West Monkseaton station has two side platforms, and is crossed by the Earsdon Road road bridge. The station building is located on the road bridge, and the platforms are accessible by stairs or ramp, providing step-free access from the street. There is no dedicated car parking available at the station. There is provision for cycle parking, with three cycle lockers and five cycle pods available for use.

The station is equipped with ticket machines, waiting shelter, seating, next train information displays, timetable posters, and an emergency help point on both platforms. Ticket machines are able to accept payment with credit and debit card (including contactless payment), notes and coins. The station is also fitted with smartcard validators, which feature at all stations across the network.

== Services ==
As of October 2024, the station is served by up to five trains per hour on weekdays and Saturday, and up to four trains per hour during the evening and on Sunday. In the eastbound direction, trains run to St James via Whitley Bay. In the westbound direction, trains run to South Shields via Monument. Additional services previously operated between Pelaw and Monkseaton at peak times, but have recently been withdrawn, as a result of poor fleet availability.
