= Palmersville Metro station =

Tyne and Wear Metro station in North Tyneside

Palmersville
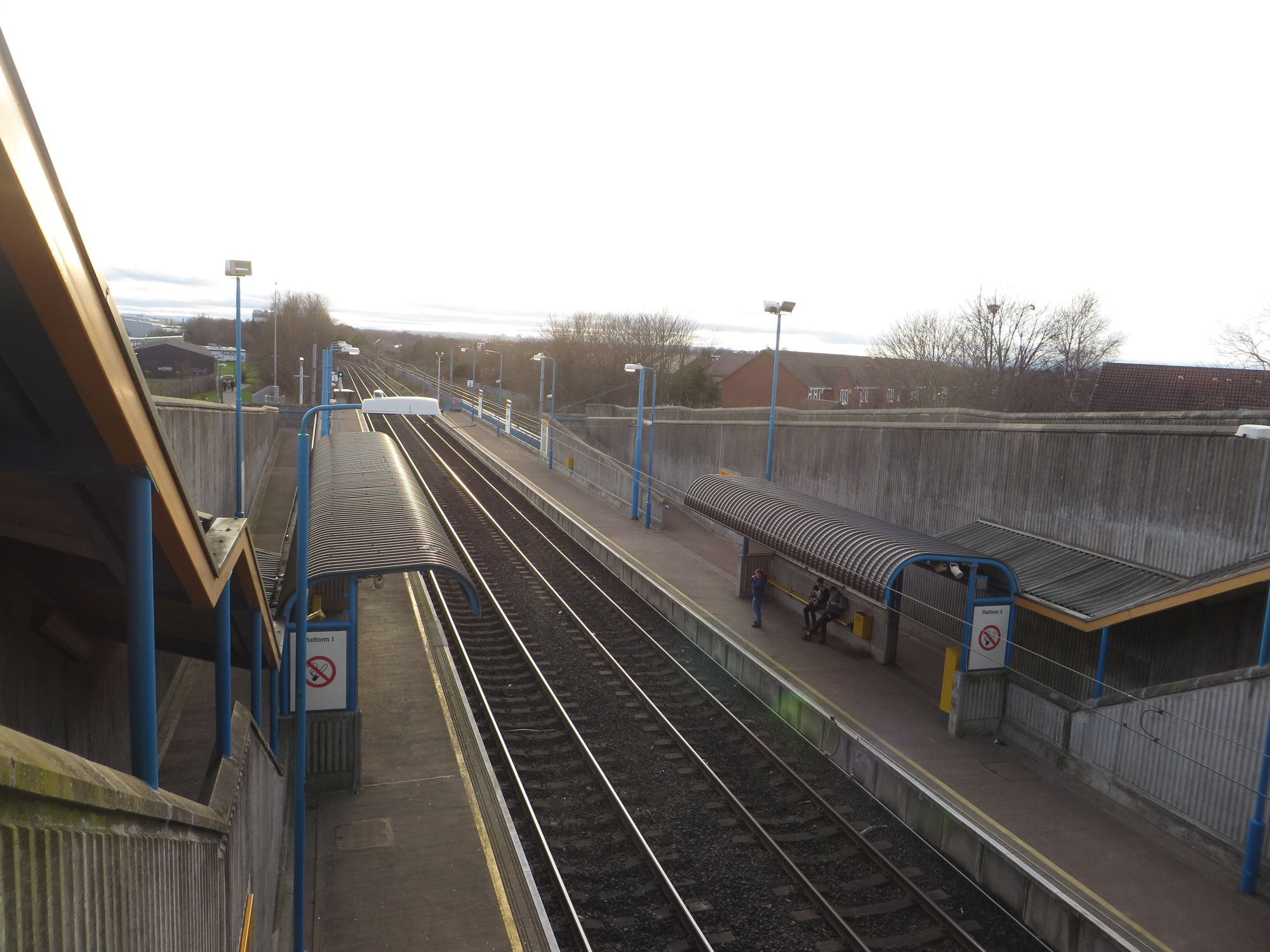

General information
- Location: Forest Hall, North Tyneside; England
- Coordinates: 55°01′25″N 1°32′28″W
- Grid reference: NZ294700
- System: Tyne and Wear Metro station
- Transit authority: Tyne and Wear PTE
- Platforms: 2
- Tracks: 2

Construction
- Cycle facilities: 5 cycle pods
- Accessible: Step-free access to platform

Other information
- Station code: PMV
- Fare zone: B

History
- Original company: Tyne and Wear Metro

Key dates
- 19 March 1986: Opened

Passengers
- 2024/25: 0.473 million

Services
Preceding station	Tyne and Wear Metro	Following station
Benton towards South Shields	Yellow line	Northumberland Park towards St James via Whitley Bay
Location
- Location within Tyne and Wear

Palmersville is a Tyne and Wear Metro station, serving the village of Holystone and suburb of Forest Hall, North Tyneside in Tyne and Wear, England. The station was opened in 1986 on the alignment of the former Blyth and Tyne Railway.

A Network Rail freight line shares the alignment at this point. This line is part of the Northumberland Line passenger service, but there are no plans for this service to stop at Palmersville.

== History ==
The station is situated on the opposite side of the bridge with Great Lime Road to the short-lived former station, Benton Square. This was opened by the North Eastern Railway on 1 July 1909, closing on 20 September 1915, as part of an economy measure during the First World War.

On 11 August 1980, the first phase of the Tyne and Wear Metro was opened through the site of the station, using part of the trackbed of the former Blyth and Tyne Railway. As originally opened, there was no metro station between Benton and Shiremoor, this being the longest distance between stations on the network. Palmersville station was subsequently constructed in this gap and opened on 19 March 1986.

In 2011, Palmersville was the first station on the network to be fitted with new ticket machines and smartcard validators, as part of the Metro: All Change programme. A total of 225 new ticket machines were eventually installed, at 60 stations, between 2011 and 2013.

== Facilities ==
The station has two side platforms, on either side of the twin Metro tracks. The single National Rail track runs behind the northern (eastbound) platform. Access to the platforms is from a concourse on a bridge across the tracks, which itself has level access to Great Lime Road. Access between the concourse and platforms is by stairs and ramps. There is no dedicated car parking available at the station, but there is provision for cycle parking, with five cycle pods available for use.

The station is equipped with ticket machines, waiting shelter, seating, next train information displays, timetable posters, and an emergency help point on both platforms. Ticket machines are able to accept payment with credit and debit card (including contactless payment), notes and coins. The station is also fitted with smartcard validators, which feature at all stations across the network.

== Services ==
As of October 2024, the station is served by up to five trains per hour on weekdays and Saturday, and up to four trains per hour during the evening and on Sunday. In the eastbound direction, trains run to St James via Whitley Bay. In the westbound direction, trains run to South Shields via Monument.
