= Holywell railway station =

Disused railway station in Backworth, Tyne and Wear

Holywell
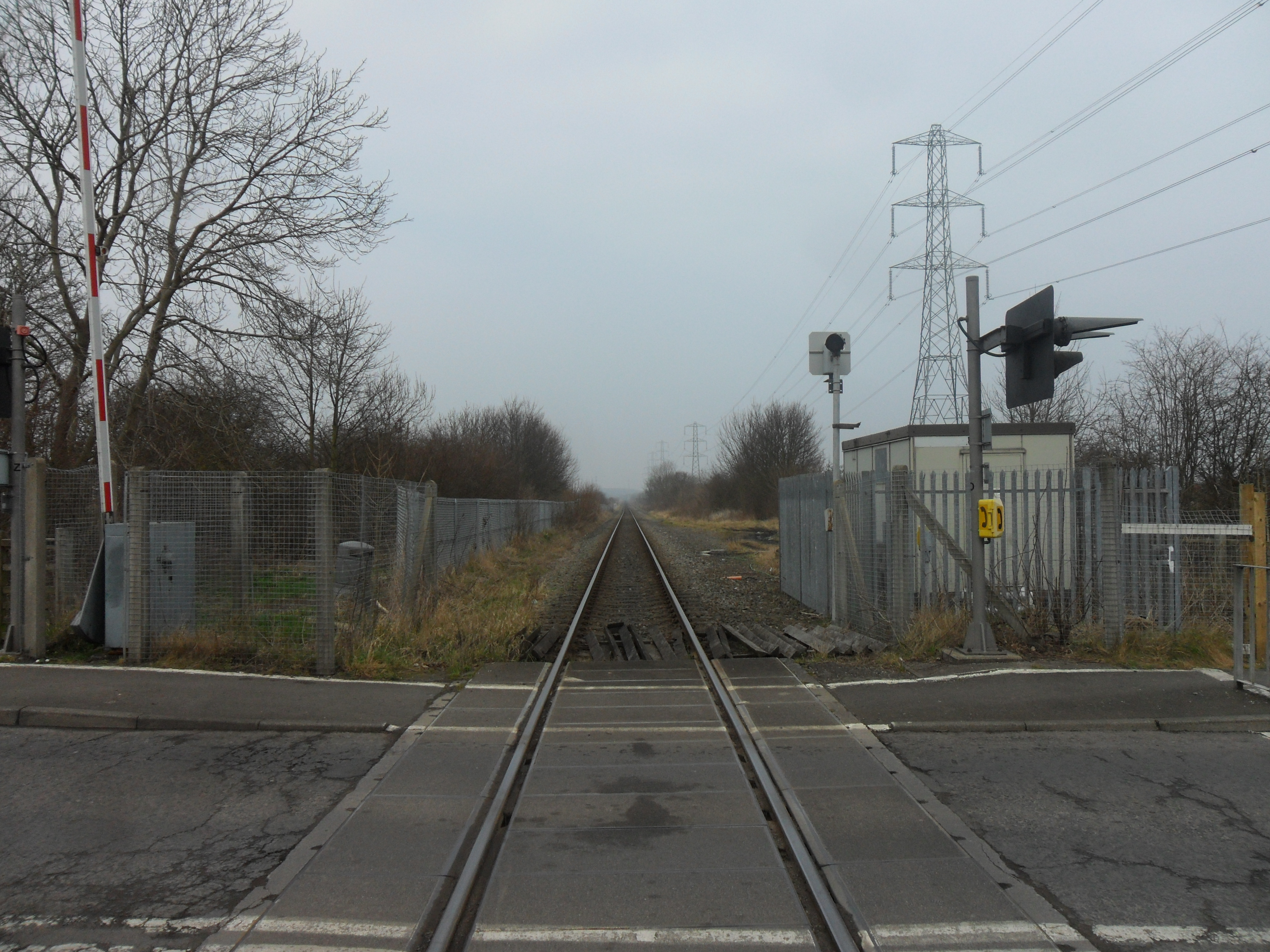
- The site of the station in 2015

General information
- Other names: Backworth
- Location: Backworth, Tyne and Wear; England
- Coordinates: 55.044047°N 1.523210°W
- Grid reference: NZ305723
- Platforms: 2

Other information
- Status: Disused

History
- Original company: Blyth, Seghill and Percy Main Railway
- Pre-grouping: Blyth and Tyne Railway; North Eastern Railway
- Post-grouping: London and North Eastern Railway

Key dates
- 1 October 1847: Opened as Holywell
- 1860: Passenger station renamed Backworth
- 27 June 1864: Closed to passengers
- 7 June 1965: Closed completely
Location

Holywell was a railway station that served the village of Backworth and nearby hamlet of Holywell in what is now the Borough of North Tyneside, North East England. Located on what is now known as the Northumberland Line, its life as a passenger station was fairly short, it having only been open between 1847 and 1860, but it survived as a goods station until 1965 on the Blyth and Tyne Railway. Between 1860 and its closure, the passenger station was known as Backworth, but the goods station retained its original name.

== History ==
The station was opened as Holywell on 1 October 1847 by the Blyth, Seghill and Percy Main Railway on the north side of the level crossing over Church Road, Backworth. From 1860, the passenger station was renamed Backworth, but goods station continued to be referred to using the original name. Only a few years after the name change, on 27 June 1864 the passenger station was closed to be replaced by Backworth station (initially named Hotspur) on the company's new branch to Newcastle New Bridge Street. It was, however, retained as a goods station for many years and, in 1904, was recorded as having handled livestock and general goods. The station was finally closed to all traffic on 7 June 1965, although the line through it remains open.

Preceding station	Disused railways	Following station
Prospect Hill; Line and station closed	Blyth and Tyne Railway; Blyth, Seghill and Percy Main Railway	Seghill; Line open; station closed
Backworth (Hotspur); Line open; station closed	Blyth and Tyne Railway; Newcastle (New Bridge Street) line	Seghill; Line open; station closed
