= Palmersville =

Palmersville can refer to:

- Palmersville, an area of Forest Hall, Tyne & Wear, United Kingdom
  - Palmersville Metro station
- Palmersville, Tennessee, United States
