= Carole Malone =

English TV presenter, journalist and broadcaster

- Born: 14 October 1954 (age 71); West Allotment, Northumberland, England (now Tyne & Wear)
- Occupations: TV presenter; journalist; broadcaster
- Spouse: Emir Mulabegovic (married 1991)

Carole Anne Malone (born 14 October 1954) is an English TV presenter, newspaper columnist and broadcaster. She appears regularly on television and radio, and writes a column for the Daily Express.

== Career ==
Malone was born on 14 October 1954 in the mining village of West Allotment, near Newcastle upon Tyne. She started her career as a journalist before moving into television. She hosted her own light-hearted court show, Guilty!, on Sky One from 1997 to 1999. From 1994 to 1996 she hosted a weekly talkshow on BBC Radio 5Live.

In 2002 and 2005, Malone was a guest panellist on Loose Women, later returned as a guest anchor covering Jackie Brambles' maternity in 2007.

Between 2006 and 2010, Malone was a regular panellist on The Wright Stuff, and again from 2013 to 2018 on Channel 5.

In 2006, she appeared on the ITV reality show Celebrity Fit Club. She was made team captain of Bobby George, Sharon Marshall and Micky Quinn, and lost three stone.

In 2007, Malone was the seventh celebrity housemate to enter Celebrity Big Brother in January 2007 and was second to be evicted from the Big Brother House on 12 January 2007. Malone had often been critical of Big Brother and on her entering the house, host Davina McCall read out many of Malone's criticisms, to jeers from the crowd.

After 10 years at the Sunday Mirror, she wrote for the News of the World until its closure in July 2011. In an article earlier in 2011, Malone had written of how proud she had been of the News of the World.

From September 2007 to April 2011, she appeared as a regular discussion contributor on The Alan Titchmarsh Show and, since 2009, has regularly reviewed the newspapers on This Morning.

From 2017 to 2021, Malone appeared weekly as a presenter on Sky News' The Pledge. Since 2021, she has appeared regularly on GB News and every Wednesday, on Jeremy Vine.

=== Retractions ===
In 2009, a complaint was made to the Press Complaints Commission about a Malone column in the News of the World, which claimed that illegal immigrants receive "free cars", leading to the newspaper being forced to issue a clarification that "illegal immigrants do not receive such a benefit and apologise for the error".

On 14 May 2012, while on ITV's This Morning, her comments implied a family were partly to blame for the deaths of six children in an arson attack in Derbyshire as they received significant state benefits which she felt drew resentment from the local community, describing the events as "an accident waiting to happen". The tenants of the house, Mick and Maired Philpott, were later convicted of manslaughter over the fatal fire, along with their friend Paul Moseley, after it was established that they had set fire to the house in an attempt to gain a larger property. ITV apologised for the comments about the Derbyshire tragedy.

In December 2025, Malone falsely alleged that Meghan Markle's mother had served time in prison on GB News after quoting online misinformation which she had failed to verify. Malone and GB News were subsequently obliged to issue a complete retraction and a full apology.

== Personal life ==
Malone is married to Emir Mulabegovic, who is Bosnian. They live in London.

Preceded by Denise Welch	Loose Women Leading Host (temporary); 2007	Succeeded by Andrea McLean & Jackie Brambles
