= Prospect Hill railway station =

Disused railway station in Shiremoor, North Tyneside

Prospect Hill

General information
- Location: Shiremoor, North Tyneside; England
- Coordinates: 55.029°N 1.5087°W
- Grid reference: NZ315706
- Platforms: 2

Other information
- Status: Disused

History
- Original company: Seghill Railway
- Pre-grouping: Blyth and Tyne Railway

Key dates
- 28 August 1847: Opened
- 27 June 1864: Closed
Location

Prospect Hill railway station served the town of Shiremoor, Tyne and Wear, England from 1847 to 1864 on the Blyth and Tyne Railway.

== History ==
The station opened on 28 August 1847 by the Seghill Railway. The station was situated north of New York Road, on the A191, and close to the junction with Benton Road. The station was rebuilt when the gradient engineering works were carried out in the 1850s. The station was closed on 27 June 1864.

Preceding station	Disused railways	Following station
Backworth (Holywell); Line and station closed	Blyth and Tyne Railway	Percy Main; Line closed, station open
