= Backworth railway station =

Disused railway station in Backworth, Tyne and Wear

Backworth
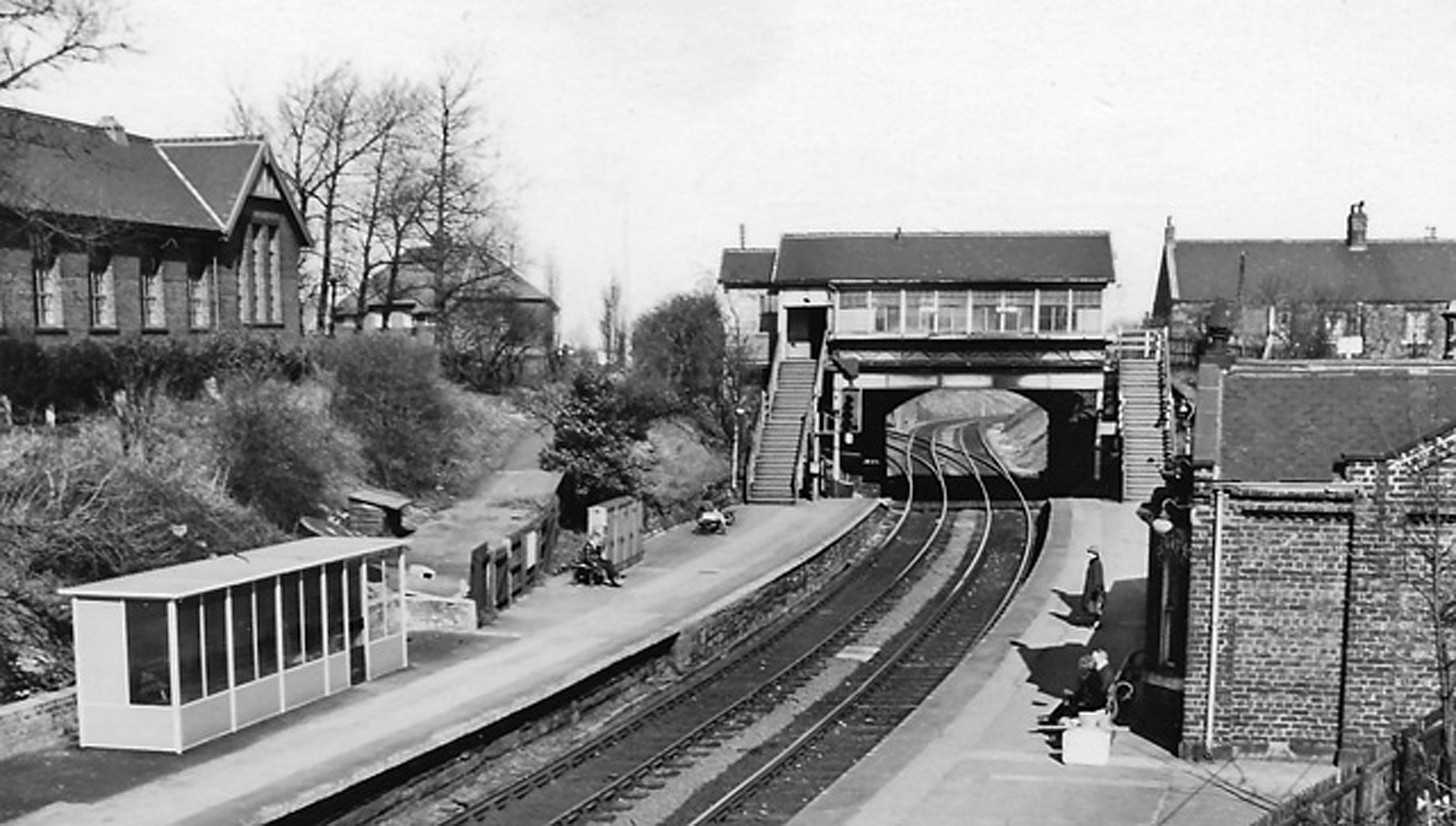
- Backworth railway station in 1970

General information
- Location: Backworth, Tyne and Wear; England
- Coordinates: 55.034°N 1.518°W
- Grid reference: NZ295700
- Platforms: 2

Other information
- Status: Disused

History
- Original company: Blyth and Tyne Railway
- Pre-grouping: North Eastern Railway
- Post-grouping: London and North Eastern Railway

Key dates
- 27 June 1864: Opened as Hotspur
- June 1865: Renamed Backworth
- 13 June 1977: Closed
Location
- Location within Tyne and Wear

Backworth was a railway station on the Blyth and Tyne Railway, serving the village of Backworth, in the borough of North Tyneside, Tyne and Wear, England. It was opened, as Hotspur, on 27 June 1864, along with the Blyth and Tyne's branch to Newcastle New Bridge Street station. It replaced another Backworth station, originally known as Holywell, on the Blyth and Tyne's original line between Percy Main and Blyth.

The station was located immediately to the Newcastle side of the junction where the Newcastle branch split, with curves to the Blyth and Tyne's original line, and to its branch to Tynemouth. Station Road crossed the line on an overbridge between the station and the junction, and the station building was at bridge level. Until the early 1970s, a bridge carried the Backworth Waggonway across the station about midway along the platforms.

Hotspur station was renamed Backworth in June 1865. Acquired in turn by the North Eastern Railway and the London and North Eastern Railway, the station passed to the North Eastern Region of British Railways on nationalisation in 1948. The line had been electrified (as the Tyneside Electric) by the North Eastern Railway in 1904 to fight competition from the newly built electric tramways, but was de-electrified in the 1960s.

The station was closed on 13 June 1977, to enable the construction of the Tyne and Wear Metro, but was not re-opened as part of that system. Initially Shiremoor was the nearest metro station to the site until the 2005 opening of Northumberland Park. The latter is located a short distance to the south east.

== Bibliography ==
- R.V.J. Butt (1995). The Directory of Railway Stations. Patrick Stephens Ltd. ISBN 1-85260-508-1 The halt is pictured on page 23.
- A. Jowett (2000). Jowett's Nationalised Railway Atlas. Atlantic Publishing. ISBN 0-906899-99-0

| Preceding station | Disused railways | Following station |
|---|---|---|
| Benton Square; Line open; station closed | North Eastern Railway; Blyth and Tyne Railway | Backworh (Holywell); Line open; station closed |
| Benton Square; Line open; station closed | North Eastern Railway; North Tyneside Loop | West Monkseaton |
