= Jack Ord =

English cricketer

Personal information
- Full name: John Douglas Ord
- Born: 1 February 1907; Backworth, Northumberland, England
- Died: 3 January 1991 (aged 83); Coventry, Warwickshire, England
- Batting: Left-handed
- Bowling: Slow left-arm orthodox
- Relatives: Jimmy Ord (brother)

Domestic team information
- Years: Team
- 1934: Minor Counties
- 1927–1936: Northumberland

Career statistics
Competition	First-class
Matches	1
Runs scored	42
Batting average	21.00
100s/50s	–/–
Top score	35
Balls bowled	–
Wickets	–
Bowling average	–
5 wickets in innings	–
10 wickets in match	–
Best bowling	–
Catches/stumpings	–/–
- Source: Cricinfo, 4 October 2011

John Douglas Ord (1 February 1907 – 3 January 1991) was an English cricketer. Ord was a left-handed batsman who bowled slow left-arm orthodox. He was born in Backworth, Northumberland.

== Life ==
Ord made his debut for Northumberland in the 1927 Minor Counties Championship against Cheshire. He played Minor counties cricket for Northumberland from 1927 to 1936, making 42 appearances for the county. He made a single first-class appearance for the Minor Counties against Oxford University in 1934. In this match, he scored 35 runs in the Minor Counties first-innings, before being dismissed by Peter Badham. In their second-innings, he was dismissed by David Walker for 7 runs, with the match ending in a draw.

He died on 3 January 1991 at Coventry, Warwickshire. His brother, Jimmy, played first-class cricket for Warwickshire.
