= Shiremoor =

Coordinates: 55.03656°N 1.504758°W

- Village
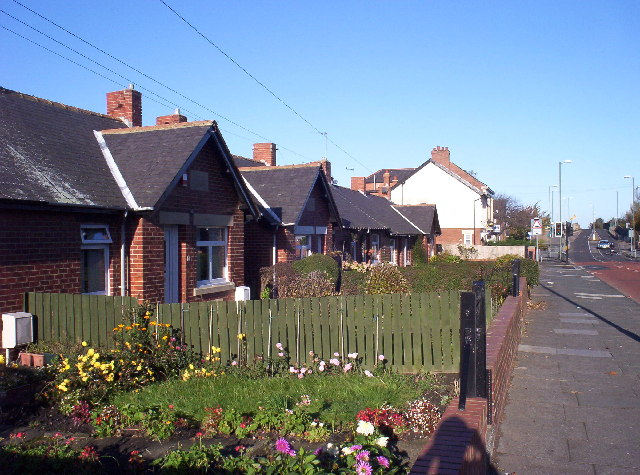
- Park Lane, Shiremoor

- Location within Tyne and Wear
- Population: 13,300 (Note: Valley Ward, 2020 estimate.)
- OS grid reference: NZ317714
- Metropolitan borough: North Tyneside
- Metropolitan county: Tyne and Wear
- Region: North East
- Country: England
- Sovereign state: United Kingdom
- Other areas of the Valley Ward: List: Backworth; West Allotment; Northumberland Park
- Post town: NEWCASTLE UPON TYNE
- Postcode district: NE27
- Dialling code: 0191
- Police: Northumbria
- Fire: Tyne and Wear
- Ambulance: North East
- UK Parliament: Cramlington and Killingworth

Shiremoor is a village in Tyne and Wear, Northern England. It is in the Metropolitan Borough of North Tyneside and formerly governed under Northumberland. In the 2011 census, it was included in the Tynemouth area of Tyneside. It is near the North East Green Belt, which surrounds Tyneside, Wearside and Durham. It is located around 3 1/2 miles (5.5 kilometres) from Whitley Bay.

It was built for miners of local colliery pits. The village is made up of smaller areas which were built there in the 20th and 21st centuries. The oldest two areas of the village are Bertram Grange and Old Shiremoor. Park Estate, Leeches Estate, and Shiremoor centre were built later as the village expanded. It has a population of 4,782. In the early 2000s, Northumberland Park was built: this area, Backworth and West Allotment are all in Shiremoor.

== History ==
The village was originally named Tynemouthshire Moor, in reference to its location on the common of the manor of Tynemouth, which was enclosed in 1790. Coal mining and quarrying had already begun in the area by this time, and the village developed through the late 18th and early 19th century to house miners from the local pits.

As the coal industry in the area declined in the mid- and late-20th century, Shiremoor saw little growth. However, with the opening of Silverlink Retail Park in the 1990s and Cobalt Business Park, the UK's largest, in the early 2000s, Shiremoor was well placed to develop as a commuter town. In the early 2000s, work began on the Northumberland Park estate, one of the largest residential developments to have been undertaken by North Tyneside Council. In addition to new housing, the estate also included two new retail parks as well as a new Metro station on the site of the former Backworth station, which opened on 11 December 2005. The new development filled in the land between Shiremoor, Backworth and West Allotment, combining the three villages into a single town.

== Transport ==
From the mid-19th century, Shiremoor was served by the Blyth & Tyne Railway with two stations, Prospect Hill, which opened in 1841, and Backworth, which opened in 1847. Both stations closed to passengers in 1864, and the line survives today as part of the Waggonways walking and cycling network. However, a second Backworth station was built on a new line, which opened in 1864 and operated until 1977, when it was closed as part of construction of the Tyne & Wear Metro. From 11 August 1980, Shiremoor had its own Metro station, newly built to the east of the site of that station.

== Shiremoor & District Children's Treat ==
Every year the local people hold a "treat" for the children of Shiremoor and surrounding villages. This tradition dates back to 1907 and has been held every year since. It was started by a group of men from the local pit and today is run by a committee of local people.

The "treat field" was originally located along Algernon Drive. However, due to new developments being built it was relocated in the early 21st century to Earsdon road, near the Grey Horse pub.

The Treat itself comprises many events that the local schools take part in. There is an art competition, a dance display, many sports competitions, including football, netball and hockey. There is always a tea tent run by the locals. Today a fun fair is held alongside the Treat.

Each year the children of the local schools receive a free "Treat Ticket". The ticket gets them an ice cream and a souvenir.

The local schools meet outside their school and "march" to the treat. This is usually led by a band and the school banner. Many local people join in the march as it is seen as very much a local tradition.

The Shiremoor Treat was cancelled in 2020 for the first time in its history due to the global COVID-19 pandemic.

== Education ==
There is a Primary School located in Shiremoor, described by Ofsted as an outstanding school. It provides for children aged up to age 11, including nurseries for 2+. It is a large school with 350+ students and 52 places in the preschool nursery. In 2011 it was designated as a teaching school.

North Tyneside Council's Pupil Referral Unit is located in Shiremoor. It is called Moorbridge and was opened in 2010. It caters for KS3 and KS4 children with Behavioural, Emotional and Social difficulties with up to 60 places.

Most of Shiremoor falls into the catchment area of George Stephenson High School, in Killingworth. However, the southernmost estate, opposite Boundary Mills, is actually in the catchment area for John Spence Community High School, in North Shields.

To the east of Shiremoor, in the Whitley Bay area, the schools still run on the three-tier system and therefore Shiremoor also falls into different catchment areas for both Middle and High schools.

== Health Care ==
There is a Resource Centre on Earsdon Road which comprises two General Practitioner Surgeries, a Pharmacy and a Library. The surgeries house 2 practices.

There is also a One to One Centre located in the old Doctors building on Brenkley Avenue offering Sexual Health services to the local community and the rest of North Tyneside.

There is one dental surgery in Shiremoor, located on Lesbury Avenue near the Metro station.

There is a St. John Ambulance First Aid Unit in Shiremoor and sheltered accommodation in Emmerson Court.

== Religion ==
The Church of England parish church of Shiremoor is located on Brenkley Avenue.

There is a Salvation Army church located on Lesbury Avenue.

The Catholic parish church for the area is Our Lady Star of the Sea.

== Economy ==
A few major retail outlets employ local residents, including Sainsbury's and Boundary Mill. Among smaller local retailers are a traditional English barber's shop, a fish and chip shop, a Chinese takeaway, a Post Office, a Spar and a number of family-owned corner stores. Other businesses include a regional car sales outlet and a national car-hire company. A café, florists, pharmacies and hairdressers represent smaller businesses.

Cobalt Business Park, the largest office park in the UK, is located between Shiremoor and West Allotment. Within the business park there are numerous different places of work, including the North Tyneside Council headquarters, an Orange Call Centre, Santander customer services, Jobcentre Plus, NHS, Hewlett-Packard, Fujitsu, Just Learning Nursery, Village Hotel and many more.

== Notable residents ==
Patrick King was the first person to be awarded the George Medal, for rescuing a blind woman during an air raid in World War II.

Bryan Hewison was born and spent his formative years in Shiremoor. Bryan gained a scholarship to the Royal Ballet (just as depicted in the film Billy Elliot) where he achieved the position of soloist. He then had a long and successful career at La Scala, Milan, dancing as Soloist for the Theatre Ballet Company.

Jackie Robinson, professional footballer, was born and died in Shiremoor. He played for Sheffield Wednesday and Sunderland FC. He played for England from 1937 to 1939 until the outbreak of the Second World War. He scored twice against the German national team in 1938, in front of Adolf Hitler, when the England players were ordered to do the Nazi salute.
