= Backworth Colliery Band =

Backworth colliery Band
- Backworth Band Logo

Background information
- Also known as: Five Rivers Brass
- Genres: Brass Band
- Years active: 1886-
- Members: Musical Director; Christopher Travis Principal Cornet; VACANCY; Solo Cornets; Stuart Hook; Oliver Dawson; Callum Mellis; Soprano Cornet; Teresa Campbell; Repiano Cornet; Judith Wood; 2nd Cornets; Trevor Gay; Nikita Gilbert-Ovens; 3rd Cornets; Oliver Scales; VACANCY; Flugel Horn; Vacancy; Solo Horn; Julie Lymath; 1st Horn; Alison Lockheart; 2nd Horn; Vacancy; 1st Baritone; Aubrey Crowe; 2nd Baritone; Lorna Price; Principal Euphonium; David Griffith; Euphonium; Karen Snaith; 1st Trombone; Ben Dovinson; 2nd Trombone; Amy Murdoch; Bass Trombone; John Thomas; E♭ Bass; Vacancy; Kevin Wilson; BB♭ Bass; Peter Barker; Tom Wood; Percussion; Tiger Wu Edan Styles
- Website: Backworth Colliery Band

Backworth Colliery Band are a traditional British Brass Band based in Backworth, Newcastle-upon-Tyne, England. The band consist of 27 senior members and 15 junior members, all of whom play brass or percussion instruments fitting the traditional brass band instrumentation.

== History of the Band ==
The early history of the band is something which is by no means clear. The date of around 1886 for the formation of the band has been deduced from Durham League material. It was set up around the same time as what is now Backworth club was built. It started life as a military band, but the band became wholly brass in 1920. The problems stem from the records of the early minutes of the band being missing, possibly lost when they moved rehearsal rooms, as they originally rehearsed in a drinking establishment which is now just across the road from their present base. The band was definitely formed out of the workforce from the surrounding pits, and sponsorship was won from the National Union of Mineworkers before the nationalisation of the coal companies in 1947.

The band has continued to perform at local concerts throughout its life. Of note too are the number of competitions the band has participated in, both locally and nationally. The band has performed as such events as the Whit Fridays, Durham Miner's Gala, CISWO Mineworkers Contest and the National Brass Band Finals.

The band changed name in 2000 to Five Rivers Brass due to a sponsorship with the Five Rivers Group. However the sponsorship only lasted for one year, and the band has reverted to being Backworth Colliery Band.

== Membership of the Band ==
The bands draw their membership from a variety of sources throughout the community. Although the band has a core membership from Backworth, Shiremoor and nearby towns such as Whitley Bay and North Shields, the bands also attract members from further afield such as Jarrow, Durham and Northumberland.

Membership is open to any player with the desire and ability to play a brass or percussion instrument. The band supplies most instruments on a loan basis and the band also provides tuition to any member requiring such assistance. The main instruments of a brass band are cornet, tenor horn, baritone horn, euphonium, trombone, tuba (bass) and percussion.

The band operates a strict Child Protection policy and Equal Opportunities policy. The band is run by a committee and is a volunteer-led, self funding organisation.

== Training Band ==
The training band was formed in 2003 as an independent body to the senior band. Backworth Colliery Training Band is a committee-led organisation, which provides the opportunity for people of all ages in the area to learn and perform brass band music.

The band is divided into two sections; a band for the more proficient players, and individuals who are just starting to learn instruments and require one-on-one tuition.

Many of the training band members also play with the senior band, and are often heard playing at the same events as the senior band.

== Other Ensembles ==
As well as performing as a traditional 27-strong brass band, the band sometimes performs as a smaller group when the occasion demands. The band also perform as a marching band for parades.

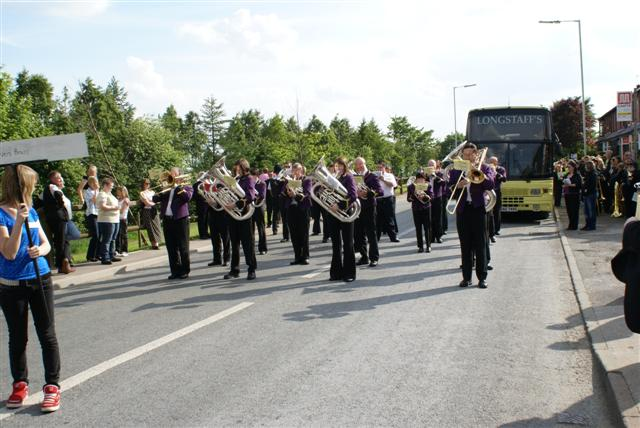
Backworth Colliery Band marching

== Concerts and Contests ==
The band performs at many concerts and contests throughout the North East.
