= Jimmy Ord =

Backworth cricketer

Personal information
- Full name: James Simpson Ord
- Born: 12 July 1912; Backworth, Northumberland, England
- Died: 14 January 2001 (aged 88); Solihull, Warwickshire, England
- Batting: Right-handed
- Bowling: Right-arm medium
- Role: Batter

Domestic team information
- Years: Team
- 1933–1953: Warwickshire

Career statistics
| Competition | First-class |
|---|---|
| Matches | 273 |
| Runs scored | 11,788 |
| Batting average | 27.80 |
| 100s/50s | 16/57 |
| Top score | 187* |
| Balls bowled | 360 |
| Wickets | 2 |
| Bowling average | 122.00 |
| 5 wickets in innings | – |
| 10 wickets in match | – |
| Best bowling | 1/0 |
| Catches/stumpings | 77/– |
- Source: CricketArchive, 20 November 2024

James Simpson Ord (12 July 1912 – 14 January 2001) was an English cricketer who played for Warwickshire from 1933 to 1953. He was born in Backworth, Northumberland and died in Solihull. He appeared in 273 first-class matches as a right-handed batsman who bowled right arm medium pace. He scored 11,788 runs with a highest score of 187 not out among 16 centuries and took two wickets with a best performance of one for 0.
