= Guilty! (TV series) =

British television series

Guilty is a British television programme which aired on Sky One from 1997 to 1999, produced by Anglia Television and presented by Carole Malone.

The show was a lighthearted comedy programme based in a mock courtroom. Participants would bring on friends or family they had problems with and would later be found guilty or not guilty by the audience.
