= Benton Square railway station =

Disused railway station in Benton, Tyne and Wear

Benton Square

General information
- Location: Benton, Tyne and Wear; England
- Coordinates: 55.0244°N 1.54°W
- Grid reference: NZ295700
- Platforms: 2

Other information
- Status: Disused

History
- Original company: North Eastern Railway
- Pre-grouping: North Eastern Railway

Key dates
- 1 July 1909: Opened
- 20 September 1915: Closed
Location
- Location within Tyne and Wear

Benton Square was a short-lived railway station on the North Eastern Railway's former Blyth and Tyne Railway, adjacent to the Great Lime Road overbridge in the borough of North Tyneside, Tyne and Wear, England.

The station was opened on 1 July 1909 by the North Eastern Railway, in order to serve the Benton Square Colliery and the adjoining miner's cottages. The only facility it had was a booking shed on Great Lime Road. It closed on 20 September 1915 as a wartime economy measure.

There are no visible remains of the station, but the line on which the station was built is still in use as part of the Tyne and Wear Metro. Palmersville Metro station lies just on the opposite (western) side of the Great Lime Road bridge.

Preceding station	Historical railways	Following station
Forest Hall; Line open, station closed	North Eastern Railway; Blyth and Tyne Railway	Backworth; Line open, station closed
