= Northumberland Park, Tyne and Wear =

Coordinates: 55.033°N 1.520°W

Northumberland Park
- Location within Tyne and Wear
- OS grid reference: NZ 308 710
- Metropolitan borough: North Tyneside
- Metropolitan county: Tyne and Wear
- Region: North East
- Country: England
- Sovereign state: United Kingdom
- Post town: NEWCASTLE UPON TYNE
- Postcode district: NE27
- Dialling code: 0191
- Police: Northumbria
- Fire: Tyne and Wear
- Ambulance: North East
- UK Parliament: Tynemouth

Northumberland Park is a place in the metropolitan borough of North Tyneside. Although built as an individual settlement along the A19 road, it is often referred to as being part of Shiremoor. There are two main housing estates in Northumberland Park and a Metro station, also named Northumberland Park.

The Northumberland Park estate should not be confused with Northumberland Park on King Edwards Road, North Shields which is a park that opened in 1885.

== Economy ==
There are a number of retail outlets in Northumberland park situated next to the Metro station. The main outlet is a purpose-built Sainsbury's.
