= Backworth =

Village in Tyne and Wear, England

Coordinates: 55.04°N 01.53°W

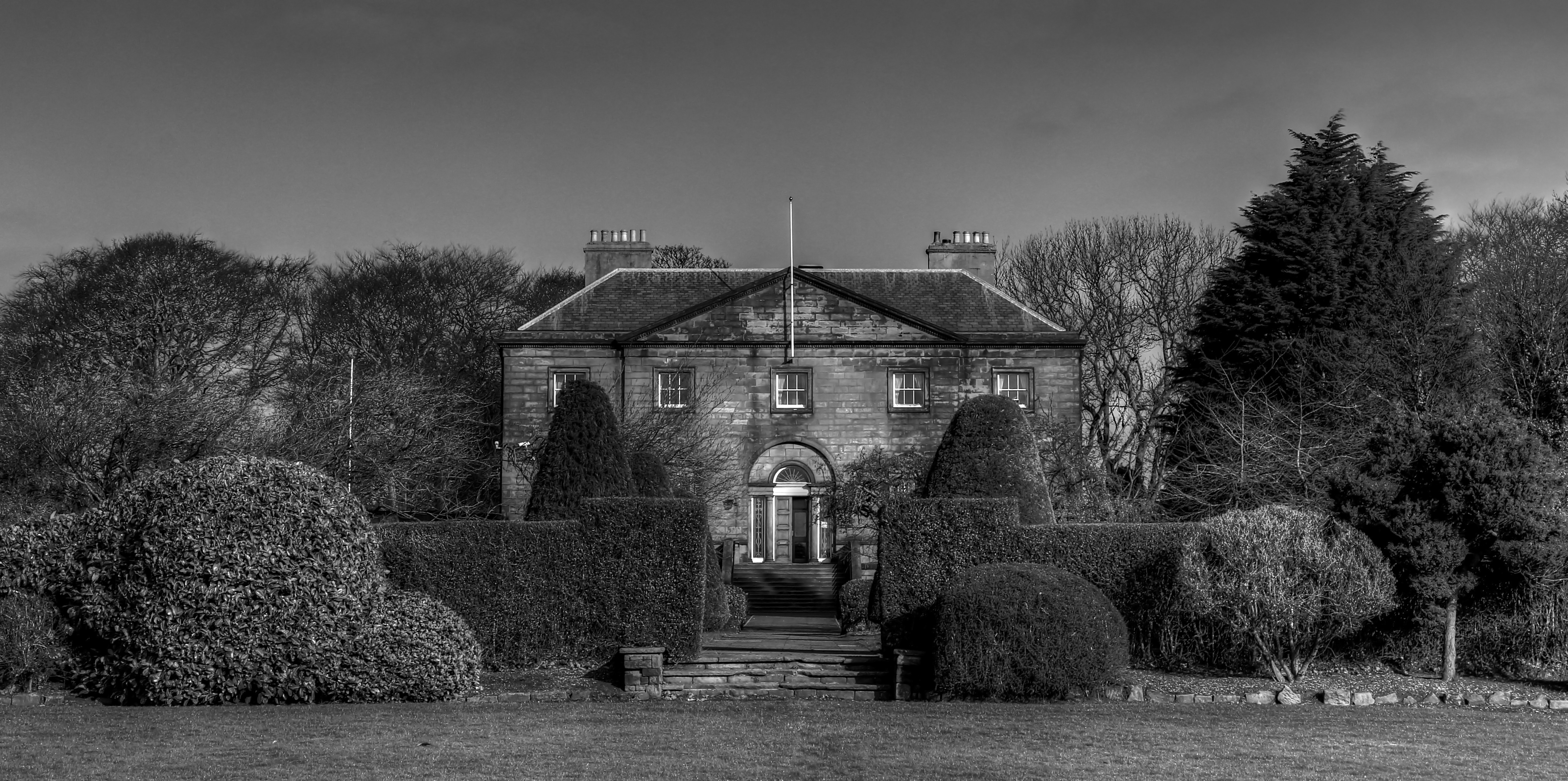
- Backworth Hall, Northumberland, England

- Location within Tyne and Wear
- Population: 1,399 (2011 Census)
- OS grid reference: NZ301722
- Metropolitan borough: North Tyneside
- Metropolitan county: Tyne and Wear
- Region: North East
- Country: England
- Sovereign state: United Kingdom
- Post town: NEWCASTLE UPON TYNE
- Postcode district: NE27
- Dialling code: 0191
- Police: Northumbria
- Fire: Tyne and Wear
- Ambulance: North East
- UK Parliament: Tynemouth

Backworth is a village in the metropolitan borough of North Tyneside in the county of Tyne and Wear, England, about 3 1/2 miles (6 km) west of Whitley Bay on the north east coast. It lies 5 miles (8 km) northeast of Newcastle upon Tyne. Other nearby towns include North Shields to the southeast, Wallsend to the south, and Cramlington to the northwest.

Backworth is often recognised to include Backworth Village, Castle Park Estate and Moorside Estate.

The hamlets of West Holywell and East Holywell lie to the northeast of Backworth. Shiremoor lies to the South-East and Earsdon to the East.

== The Village ==
The original part of Backworth is commonly referred to as the village. It is home to several cottages dating back to the 19th century. There is also a church, Village Hall, a post office, Chinese take-away, a convenience store, hair dressers and barber shop, a pharmacy and grooming parlour.

== History ==
Backworth was formerly a township in the parish of Earsdon, in 1866 Backworth became a separate civil parish, on 1 April 1935 the parish was abolished to form Seaton Valley. In 1931 the parish had a population of 3154.

=== Backworth Manor ===
In an assessment-roll of 1292 Backworth is included as one of the ten manors belonging to Tynemouth Priory. "Though Preston, Monkseaton, Backworth and Flatworth do not appear in the record of 1264, corroborative evidence of their manorial character is found in their possessing halls, while Flatworth, Backworth and Monkseaton had separate demesnes...". There is insufficient information available, however, with which either to locate the manor, or to describe it. Without further documentary research it is unknown whether it was associated with farm buildings, or whether it was located near the present Backworth Hall.

=== West Backworth Village ===
It seems that there were certainly two Backworths in 1189 when King Richard I confirmed Tynemouth Priory in possession of their lands, and there is explicit mention of both East and West Backworth in 1306. The lay subsidy roll of 1296 records 4 taxpayers here. West Backworth still existed in 1353, but was deserted by the 16th century, not appearing in the Dissolution survey. Wrathmell suggests that it lost its identity in the priory's reorganisation of their estates in the 15th century.

West Backworth is now a deserted medieval village. Aerial photographs show a row of crofts along each side of an east-west street, but this is not clear on the ground where there is prominent but disturbed ridge and furrow, and little trace of a two-row village plan. The site today is an open field to the south-east of West Farm, and can be found immediately to the south of Backworth Lane, and to the west of Killingworth Lane. The east-west main street is visible as a holloway heading towards East Backworth.

=== Backworth Roman Hoard ===
A hoard of gold and silver objects was found in 1812, supposedly near Backworth and, according to Haverfield, was sold to a Newcastle silversmith. He resold "all, or nearly all" to Mr. J. Brumell, a Newcastle collector, from whom most of the objects passed in 1850 to the British Museum. The hoard consisted of: a silver skillet in which were a pair of silver-gilt trumpet brooches, one silver and five gold rings, one gold bracelet, two gold chains with wheel-shaped pendant, and a crescent attached, three silver spoons, another silver skillet, 280+ Roman denarii, and two first brass coins of Antoninus Pius. A white bronze mirror had served as a cover. The date of deposition is thought likely to be A.D. 140. The larger skillet and one of the gold rings each have an inscription, a dedication to the mother-goddesses. This list does not wholly accord with Haverfield's: in particular he suggests that an oval silver dish 18 inches long and 2 pieces of a silver bridle bit never reached the British Museum.

=== 19th century onwards ===
Backworth was a centre of coal mining through the 19th century and much of the 20th century. Brickmaking took place just north of the village on the site of the former "C Pit" from the late 19th to mid-20th century. As late as 1950, 2,905 people were employed in the collieries in and immediately around Backworth.

In the early 1970s, the railway system serving Backworth Colliery was one of the few places where steam locomotives could still be seen at work, and a number of its locomotives have been preserved at various heritage railways. Footage of the locomotives (with the colliery itself in the background) taken around this time can be seen on YouTube. A lean-to on the side of the colliery's engine shed also provided a place for the fledgling preservation movement to store locomotives rescued from elsewhere.

In 1980, Backworth's last pit, Eccles Colliery, (the deepest in the Northumberland Coalfield at 1,440 ft) closed after 165 years of mining in the area. The concrete caps covering the backfilled shafts of the "A" pit, Maude and Eccles shafts can still be seen on the site of the colliery. Only the colliery's former workshops survived the demolition of the surface buildings. These back onto Station Road opposite the golf club, and are home to retail and light industrial units.

When the Metro rapid transit system replaced the British Rail passenger line through Backworth in 1980, Backworth Station had the distinction of being the only stop on the network to be closed due to lack of custom. The test track for the Metro was built at Middle Engine Lane (named after one of the stationary haulage engines used before the introduction of locomotives in the mid-19th century) on the former line from the colliery to the staithes, and is now home to the North Tyneside Steam Railway.

== New developments ==
In recent years Backworth has been subjected to substantial residential development alongside the A19 corridor. The new Northumberland Park Metro Station is centre of a new residential area between Backworth and Shiremoor and West Allotment. A new Sainsbury's store was opened on 15 February.

== Music ==
Backworth is home to two traditional British brass bands – the Backworth Colliery Band and Junior Band. The Backworth Male Voice Choir rehearse in nearby Cullercoats.

== Sport ==
Backworth is home to Backworth Cricket Club, which plays in Northumberland and Tyneside senior league.

Backworth is also home to Backworth Golf Course, the only 9-hole course in the area. Before people played golf there it was the Miners' Welfare Hall. Backworth has a ten-hole parkland golf course for both members and visitors alike. At 5800 yards, Backworth Golf Course is a par 71 with a Standard scratch scoring of 68. The course record stands at 66, an indication that the course is no pushover. The well-defended greens are small targets requiring a very good short game to put together a good score.

== Notable people ==
- Jack Ord (1907 –1991), cricketer
