= Monkseaton Metro station =

Tyne and Wear Metro station in North Tyneside

Monkseaton
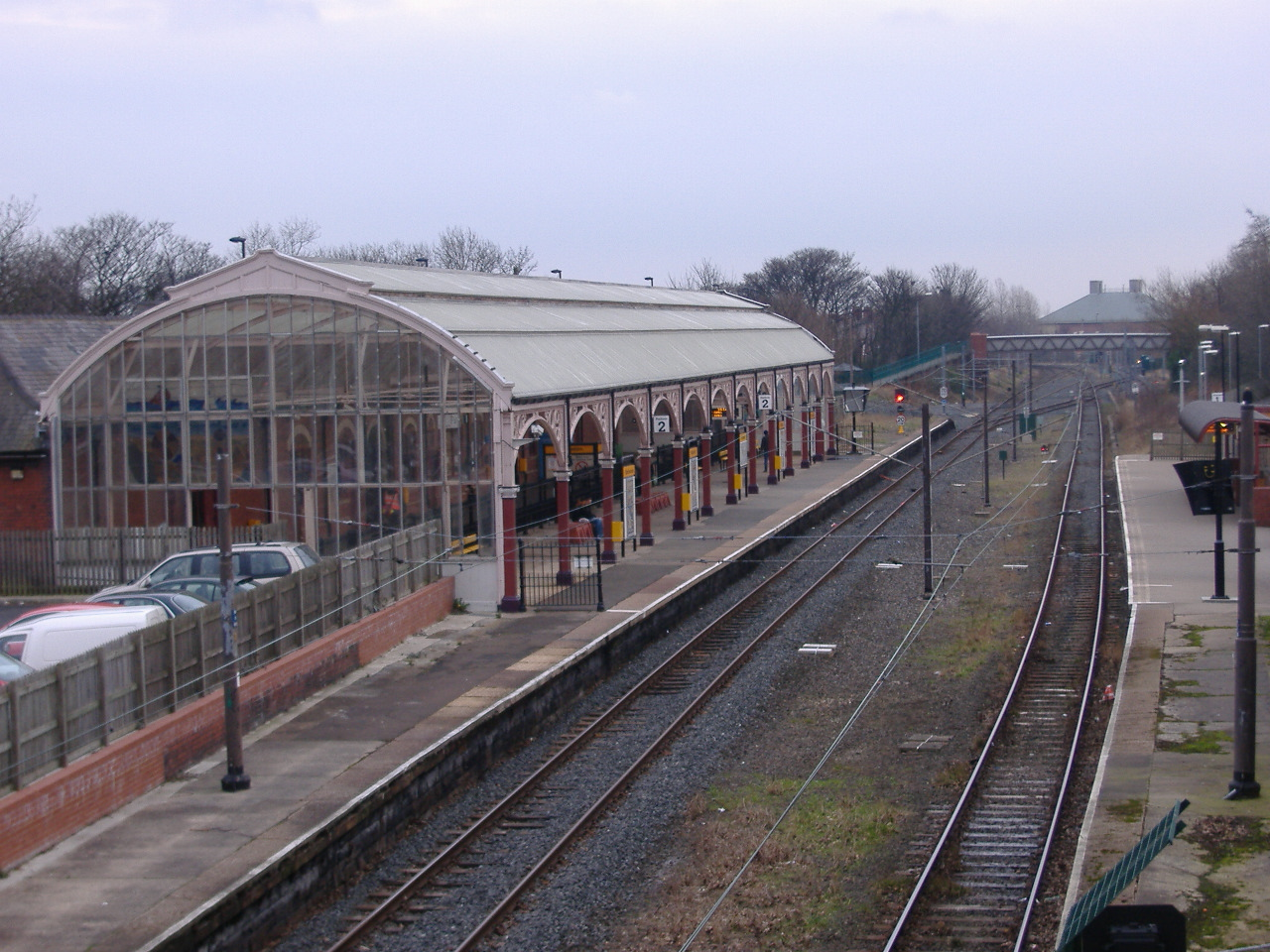

General information
- Location: Monkseaton, North Tyneside; England
- Coordinates: 55°02′32″N 1°27′30″W
- Grid reference: NZ347721
- System: Tyne and Wear Metro station
- Transit authority: Tyne and Wear PTE
- Platforms: 2
- Tracks: 2

Construction
- Parking: 22 spaces
- Cycle facilities: 10 cycle pods
- Accessible: Step-free access to platform

Other information
- Station code: MSN
- Fare zone: C

History
- Original company: Blyth and Tyne Railway
- Pre-grouping: North Eastern Railway
- Post-grouping: London and North Eastern Railway; British Rail (Eastern Region)

Key dates
- 27 June 1864: Opened as Whitley
- 3 July 1882: Renamed Monkseaton
- 25 July 1915: Resited
- 10 September 1979: Closed for conversion
- 11 August 1980: Reopened

Passengers
- 2024/25: 0.884 million

Services
Preceding station	Tyne and Wear Metro	Following station
West Monkseaton towards South Shields	Yellow line	Whitley Bay towards St James via Whitley Bay
Location
- Location within Tyne and Wear

Monkseaton is a Tyne and Wear Metro station, serving the suburb of Monkseaton, North Tyneside in Tyne and Wear, England. It joined the network on 11 August 1980, following the opening of the first phase of the network, between Haymarket and Tynemouth via Four Lane Ends.

== History ==
Monkseaton has been served by a station since June 1864, with the station at the current site opened in July 1915, under the North Eastern Railway. Following closure for conversion in the late 1970s, much of the original North Eastern Railway station building, dating from 1915, was retained. However, the southbound platform (trains towards South Shields) and buildings were demolished and replaced.

Monkseaton was recently refurbished, along with Cullercoats and West Monkseaton, in 2018, as part of the Metro: All Change programme. The refurbishment involved the installation of new seating and lighting, resurfaced platforms, and improved security and accessibility. The station was also painted in to the new black and white corporate colour scheme.

== Facilities ==
The station has two platforms, both of which have ticket machines (which accept cash, card and contactless payment), smartcard validators, waiting shelter, seating, next train audio and visual displays, timetable and information posters and an emergency help point. The station building houses a restaurant, shop and micropub. There is step-free access to both platforms, with platforms linked by road bridge. The station has a free car park, with 22 spaces (plus one accessible space). There is also cycle storage at the station, with ten cycle pods.

== Services ==
As of April 2021, the station is served by up to five trains per hour on weekdays and Saturday, and up to four trains per hour during the evening and on Sunday between South Shields and St James via Whitley Bay. Prior to 12 December 2005, services operated between South Hylton and St James via Whitley Bay.

== Art ==
- Beach & Shipyards (1983) is an installation of two stained glass works, designed by Mike Davies, which have been incorporated into each end of the original glazed canopy, protecting passengers on the platform from the weather.
