= Haymarket Metro station =

Tyne and Wear Metro station in Newcastle upon Tyne, England

Haymarket
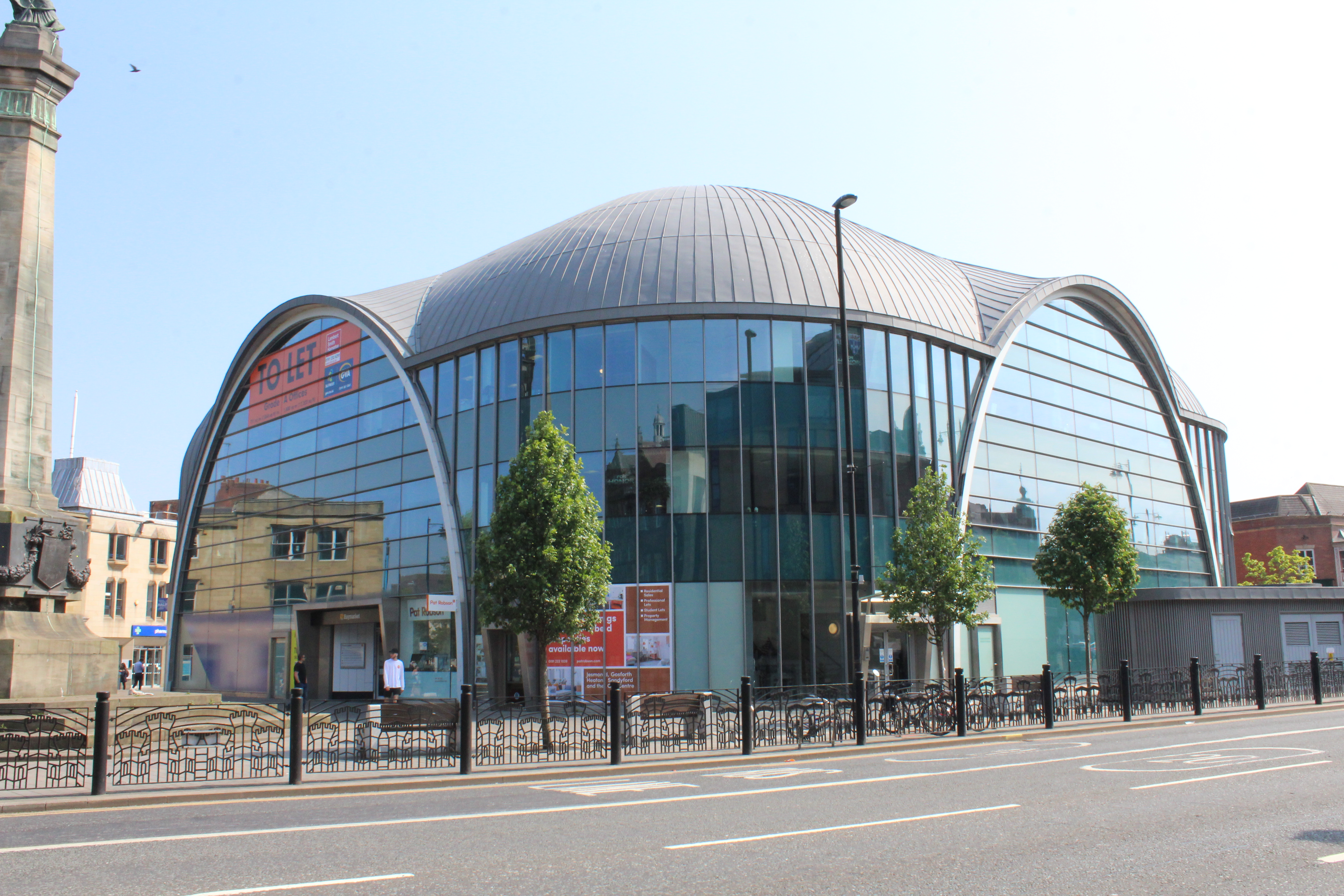
- The Haymarket Hub, in which the station is located.

General information
- Location: Haymarket, NE1; Newcastle upon Tyne; England
- Coordinates: 54.9775°N 1.6139°W
- OS Grid ref: NZ 248 648
- System: Tyne and Wear Metro
- Owner: Nexus
- Platforms: 2
- Tracks: 2

Construction
- Structure type: Underground
- Cycle facilities: Yes
- Accessible: Step-free access throughout, with lifts from street-level to platforms and level-boarding to trains
- Architect: Reid Jubb Brown

Other information
- Status: Staffed part-time
- Station code: HAY
- Fare zone: A

Key dates
- 11 August 1980: Opened as a terminus (Note: Phase 1 of Metro opened between Tynemouth and Haymarket on 11 August 1980.)
- 15 November 1981: Opened as a through station (Note: Phase 3 of Metro opened between Haymarket and Heworth on 15 November 1981.)
- 2009: Rebuilt/refurbished

Passengers
- 2020/21: ▼0.703 million
- 2021/22: ▲3.118 million
- 2022/23: ▲4.220 million
- 2023/24: ▼3.916 million
- 2024/25: ▲4.493 million

Services
Preceding station	Tyne and Wear Metro	Following station
Monument towards South Hylton	Green line	Jesmond towards Airport
Monument towards South Shields	Yellow line	Jesmond towards St James via Whitley Bay
Location
- Location within Newcastle-upon-Tyne Location within Tyne and Wear
Notes
- Passenger statistics from Nexus.

Haymarket is a Tyne and Wear Metro station, serving the Haymarket area of the Newcastle upon Tyne in Tyne and Wear, England. It opened as a terminus station on 11 August 1980, following the completion of the first phase of the network, between Haymarket and Tynemouth via Four Lane Ends. The station underwent extensive remodelling in 2009. It is served by up to 10 trains per hour, in each direction.

== History ==
The station opened to through services on 15 November 1981, following the opening of the third phase of the network, between Haymarket and Heworth. Prior to this, trains reversed using the crossover between Haymarket and Monument.

Haymarket is situated at the northern end of Northumberland Street. It is a short walk from both Newcastle and Northumbria universities, Newcastle Civic Centre and the Great North Museum: Hancock. It is located around 100 m (330 ft) from Haymarket bus station, and 250 m (820 ft) from Eldon Square bus station.

It is the deepest station on the Tyne and Wear Metro network. Prior to the station's refurbishment in the late 2000s, the staircase (since replaced by a third escalator) had 105 steps. The station also has underground rooms, restricted from the public, which contain archives and various historical documents.

The station was used by 4,493,929 passengers in 2024–25.

== Haymarket Hub ==
In August 2006, final plans for the complete reconstruction of the station, costing £20 million, were released. Plans for a proposed £9 million facelift for the station had previously been announced in 2004.

Tolent Construction was appointed as contractor for the project, and was headed by the development vehicle, 42nd Street Haymarket Hub. Reid Jubb Brown were the building's architects, with Arup employed as consulting engineers.

Newcastle-based creative communications agency, Gardiner Richardson – alongside University of Sunderland lecturer Lothar Götz – worked on redeveloping the station's passenger areas. Gardiner Richardson's work centred on updating Metro's corporate branding, including the colour palette and signage. Lothar Götz created an artwork, Canon, using a number of coloured vitreous enamel panels in the concourse, escalator shaft and platform area.

A total of £5 million was spent on refurbishing the passenger area of the station, with work completed in 2009. The station now serves as a blueprint for other station modernisation projects within the Metro: All Change programme, with Central Station refurbished to a similar style in 2017.

The Princess Royal, Princess Anne, officially opened the newly-refurbished Haymarket on 29 March 2010, after travelling on the Metro from Jesmond.

Haymarket Hub was shortlisted for the 2010 Carbuncle Cup – an architecture prize, given annually by Building Design to "the ugliest building in the United Kingdom completed in the last 12 months".

== Facilities ==
Step-free access is available at all stations across the Tyne and Wear Metro network, with a lift providing step-free access to platforms at Haymarket. As part of the station's refurbishment, lifts and escalators were replaced, with an additional third escalator installed. The station is equipped with ticket machines, seating, next train information displays, timetable posters, and an emergency help point on both platforms. Ticket machines are able to accept payment with credit and debit card (including contactless payment), notes and coins. The station is fitted with automatic ticket barriers, which were installed at 13 stations across the network during the early 2010s, as well as smartcard validators, which feature at all stations. The station houses a number of shops, services and offices.

There is no dedicated car parking available at the station. There is a taxi rank located adjacent to the nearby Haymarket bus station. There is also the provision for cycle parking, with 46 cycle spaces and 20 cycle racks available for use.

== Services ==
As of May 2026, the station is served by up to ten trains per hour – in each direction – on weekdays and Saturdays, and up to eight trains per hour during the evening and on Sundays. Additional services operate between Pelaw and Monkseaton or Regent Centre at peak times.
