= Monument Metro station =

Tyne and Wear Metro station in Newcastle upon Tyne

Monument
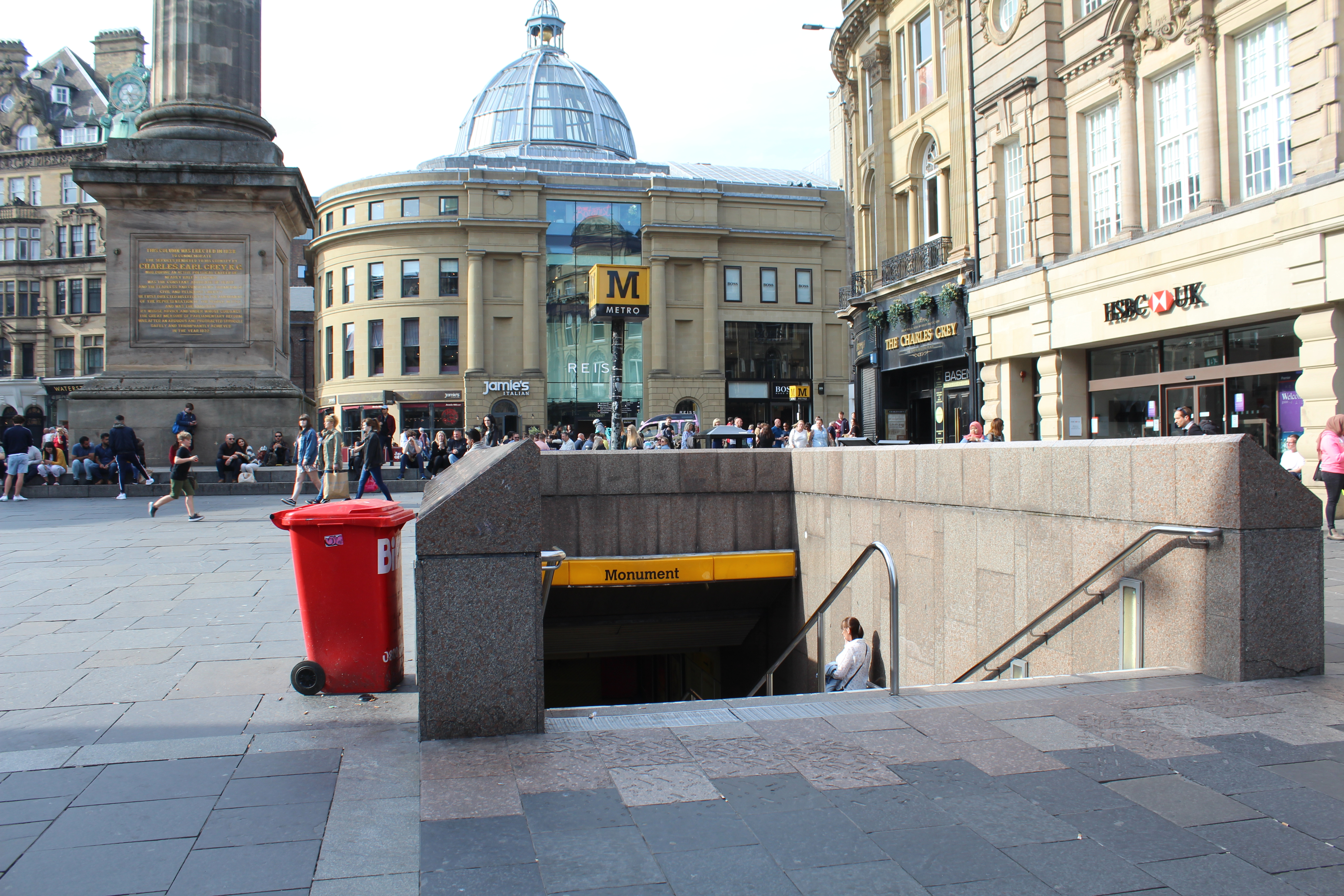
- Grey Street entrance, with the base of Grey's Monument visible

General information
- Location: Blackett Street, Monument, NE1; Newcastle upon Tyne; England
- Coordinates: 54.9736°N 1.6132°W
- OS Grid ref: NZ 248 644
- System: Tyne and Wear Metro
- Owner: Nexus
- Platforms: 4
- Tracks: 4

Construction
- Structure type: Underground
- Platform levels: 2
- Cycle facilities: 20 cycle racks (owned by Newcastle City Council)
- Accessible: Step-free access throughout, with lifts from street-level to platforms and level-boarding to trains

Other information
- Status: Staffed part-time
- Station code: MMT
- Fare zone: A

History
- Original company: Tyne and Wear Metro

Key dates
- 15 November 1981: Opened: platforms 1 & 2 (N-S)
- 14 November 1982: Opened: platforms 3 & 4 (E-W)

Passengers
- 2020/21: ▼1.257 million
- 2021/22: ▲5.900 million
- 2022/23: ▲7.390 million
- 2023/24: ▲7.724 million
- 2024/25: ▲8.119 million

Services
Preceding station	Tyne and Wear Metro	Following station
Central Station towards South Hylton	Green line	Haymarket towards Airport
Central Station towards South Shields	Yellow line	Haymarket towards St James via Whitley Bay
Manors towards South Shields via Whitley Bay	Yellow line	St James Terminus
Location
- Location within Newcastle-upon-Tyne Location within Tyne and Wear
Notes
- Passenger statistics from Nexus.

Monument is an underground Tyne and Wear Metro station, serving the Monument area of the city of Newcastle upon Tyne in Tyne and Wear, England. It opened on 15 November 1981, initially with only the north–south platforms in use. The east–west platforms opened a year later.

The station is named after Grey's Monument, which stands directly above it.

It is the most-used station on the Metro network, with 8.1 million passengers in 2024/25, – almost twice the number as the second-most-used station, Central Station – but still lower than the pre-pandemic figure of 9.5 million in 2018/19.

== History ==
The station opened with services from the lower-level platforms (1 and 2) commencing on 15 November 1981, when the line was extended south from the temporary terminus at Haymarket to Heworth Interchange, as part of phase two of the network.

The remaining two platforms on the upper level (3 and 4) opened when services between Tynemouth and St James via Wallsend Interchange commenced on 14 November 1982, as part of phase four of the network.

During construction, it was discovered that the column of Grey's Monument – the 41 m (135 ft) statue, built in 1838, that sits above the station – had foundations less than 2 m (6 ft 7 in) deep. The engineers had to build better supports for the monument.

== Facilities ==
The ticket hall has a number of exits, including into the Fenwick department store, Eldon Square Shopping Centre, Blackett Street and Grey Street.

The ticket hall contains some shops, including a branch of Sainsbury's Local. The station previously housed a Nexus TravelShop, which closed in 2015.

== Services ==
As of May 2026, platforms 1 and 2 are served by up to ten trains per hour – in each direction – on weekdays and Saturdays, and up to eight trains per hour each-way during the evening and on Sundays. Additional services operate between Pelaw and Monkseaton or Regent Centre at peak times.

Platforms 3 and 4 are served by up to five trains per hour – in each direction – on weekdays and Saturdays, and up to four trains per hour each-way during the evening and on Sundays.

== Artworks ==
The station features three art installations. Outside the station, a simple ventilation shaft has been disguised by Parsons Polygon. Created by David Hamilton, in 1985, as a tribute to Sir Charles Parsons. It is made from clay and features abstract designs based on Parsons' engineering drawings.

Inside the Blackett Street entrance is a mural, Famous Faces, created in 1996 by Bob Olley. It features a number of famous people from North East England, looking out of the window of a Metrocar. Maxïmo Park, who grew up in the area, mention the mural in their song By the Monument.

Circuit was installed in 2001. Created by Richard Cole, it features designs based on electronic circuit boards, that have been sand-blasted into the walls and paving of station entrances.

== Gallery ==
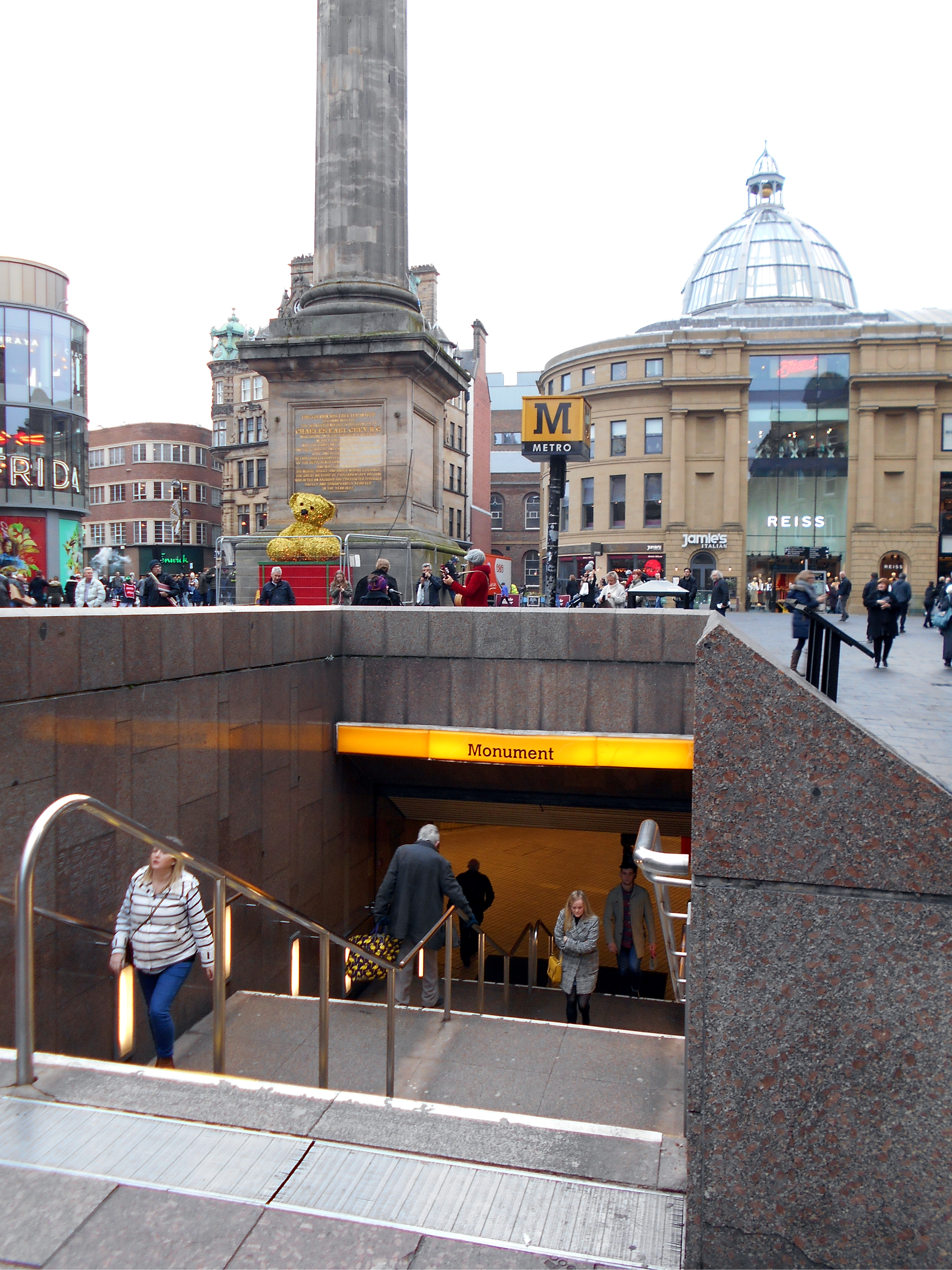
The station's Blackett Street entrance, situated adjacent to Grey's Monument.

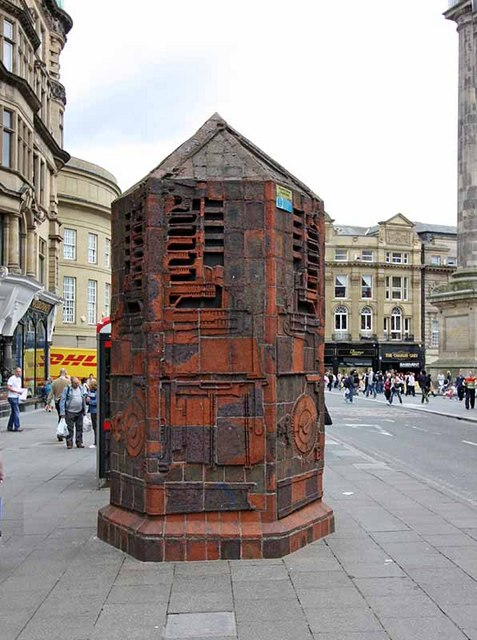
Ventilation shaft disguised by the Parsons Polygon artwork.

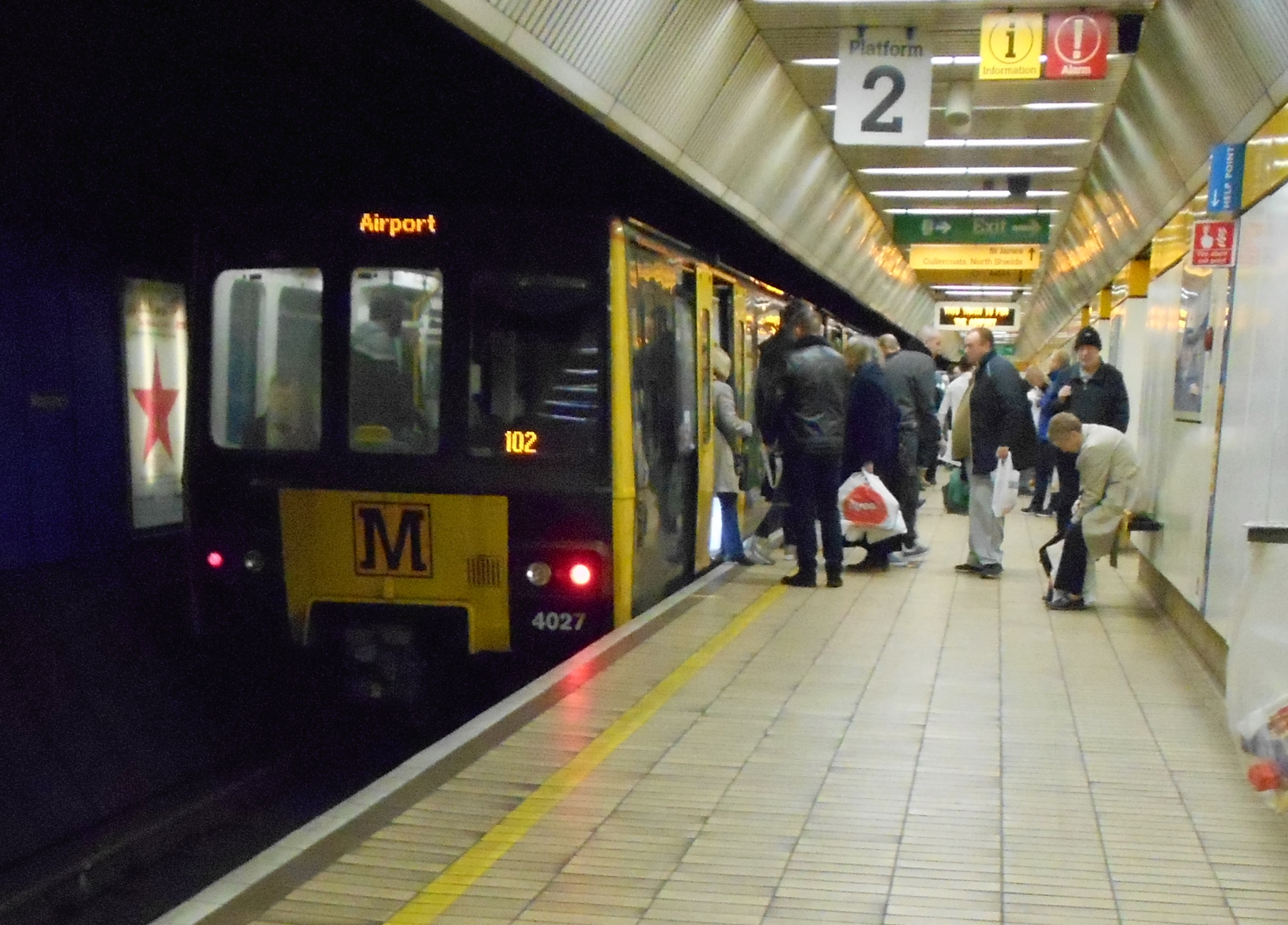
A Metrocar bound for Newcastle Airport at platform 2.

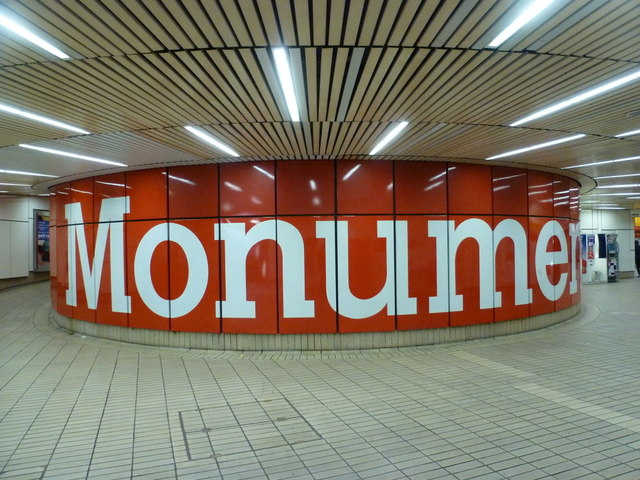
The station concourse, photographed in August 2011.
