= West Allotment =

Coordinates: 55.0277°N 1.5174°W

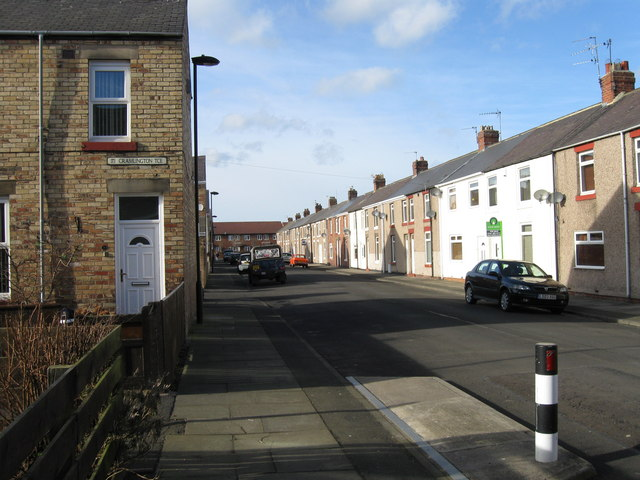
- Taylor Terrace, West Allotment

- Location within Tyne and Wear
- OS grid reference: NZ308704
- Metropolitan borough: North Tyneside
- Metropolitan county: Tyne and Wear
- Region: North East
- Country: England
- Sovereign state: United Kingdom
- Post town: NEWCASTLE UPON TYNE
- Postcode district: NE27
- Dialling code: 0191
- Police: Northumbria
- Fire: Tyne and Wear
- Ambulance: North East
- UK Parliament: North Tyneside

West Allotment is a village in the Metropolitan Borough of North Tyneside. Prior to 1974 it was part of Northumberland. It is located approximately 4 miles (6.4 km) inland of Whitley Bay and approximately 3 miles (4.8 km) north of The Tyne Tunnel. A mile or so north of West Allotment, the extensive built-up areas of North Tyneside change abruptly into green belt stretching north into south east Northumberland.

West Allotment was originally a mining community. There is a World War One memorial situated on Benton Road.

Silverlink Biodiversity Park is a local nature reserve adjacent to the village, which at the top of the hill has an ornate giant sundial at its summit.

West Allotment is the nearest village to the Cobalt Business Park in North Tyneside. The Cobalt is the UK's largest office park, and is the largest conglomeration of purpose-built office space in the Northern Hemisphere. Companies housed on the business park include Procter & Gamble, Orange, Santander UK, G4S; North Tyneside Council is also based there.

== Housing estates ==
West Allotment used to consist only of 'The Allotment', built around 1820. The original Allotment houses were demolished under a 1960s slum clearance scheme.

In the late 1800s, further land was purchased by the local colliery (Backworth Colliery Co Ltd) to build housing for miners. This new estate was named the "West Allotment". In the late 1990s, two new estates were constructed: Murrayfields and Holyfields. Holyfields is the larger of the two.

Several sources refer to the village's name being connected to miners' garden allotments. However, this is not accurate, as the name comes from the enclosure acts, and this part of Tynemouthshire Moor being allocated to the Preston Township. This portion of land retained the simple name of allotment, it was boggy moorland, of no merits for farming of grazing, the original 1820's village being called either "The Allotment" or "Northumberland Place". A copy of the original lease, dated 1898, between the Duke of Northumberland and the Backworth Colliery Co Ltd for the land on which the West Allotment Terraces were built exists.The lease document is now held in the local history section, North Shields Library (2020)

== Subsidence ==
A small number of properties in the area known as Bayfields were found to have subsidence damage early in 2016. Investigations by the Coal Authority to find out the cause of the ground movement concluded that the surface damage at Bayfield was probably as a result of historical shallow coal mining. It was found necessary to demolish some properties, with compensation to the residents.

The historical mining was from a period long before any requirements were in place to keep records, the mining would have ranged from Bell Pits to shallow drift mines. The developer made numerous boreholes to check the underground conditions, depending on the borehole spacing it is fairly easy to miss a small underground feature, a balance between what is practical and economically viable when carrying out site investigations.
