= Whitley Bay Metro station =

Tyne and Wear Metro station in North Tyneside

Whitley Bay
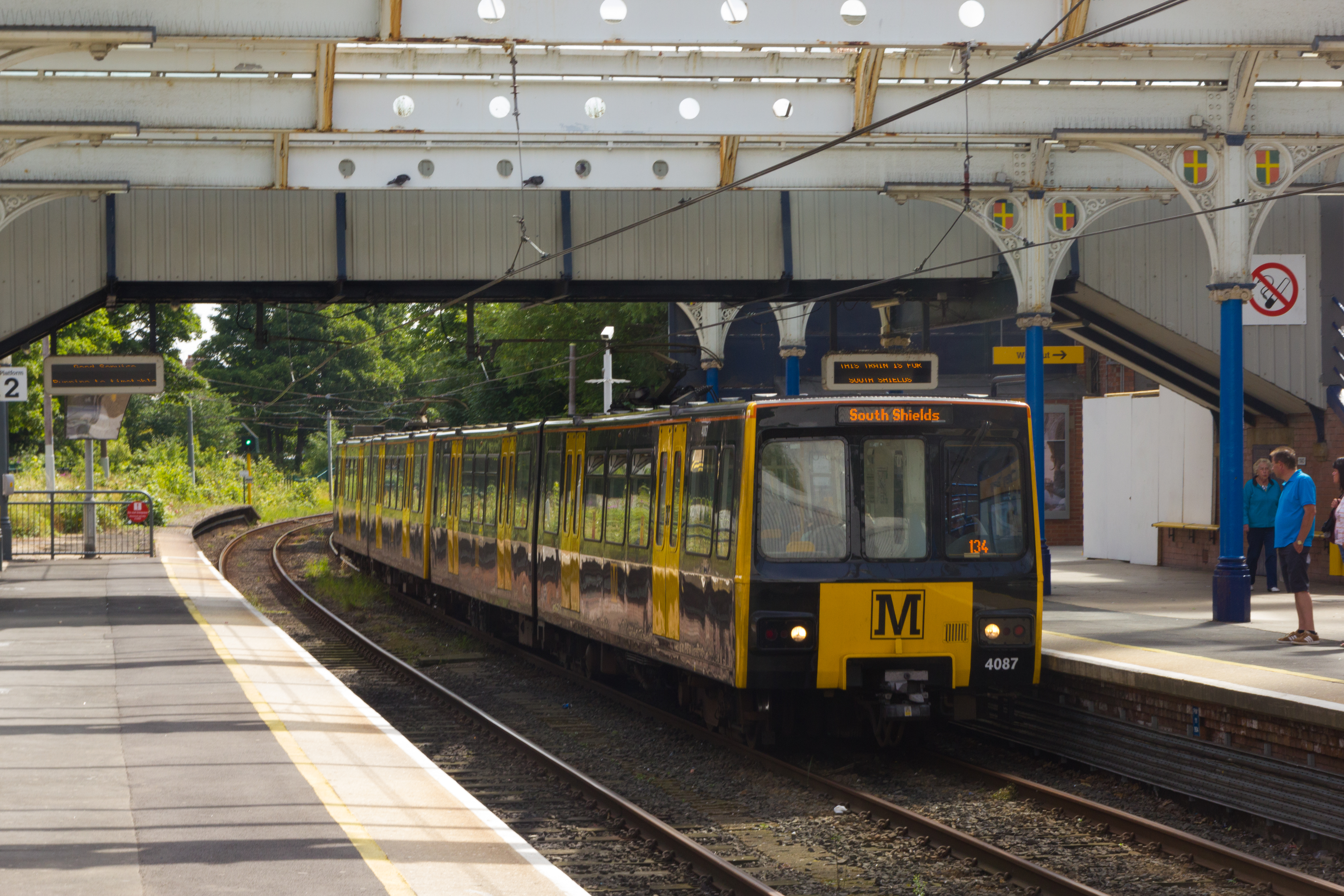

General information
- Location: Whitley Bay, North Tyneside; England
- Coordinates: 55°02′23″N 1°26′32″W
- Grid reference: NZ357718
- System: Tyne and Wear Metro station
- Transit authority: Tyne and Wear PTE
- Platforms: 2
- Tracks: 2

Construction
- Parking: 76 spaces
- Cycle facilities: 8 cycle lockers; 8 cycle pods
- Accessible: Step-free access to platform

Other information
- Station code: WTL
- Fare zone: C

History
- Original company: North Eastern Railway
- Pre-grouping: North Eastern Railway
- Post-grouping: London and North Eastern Railway; British Rail (Eastern Region)

Key dates
- 3 July 1882: Opened as Whitley
- 1 July 1899: Renamed Whitley Bay
- 9 October 1910: Resited
- 10 September 1979: Closed for conversion
- 11 August 1980: Reopened

Passengers
- 2024/25: 1.211 million

Services
Preceding station	Tyne and Wear Metro	Following station
Monkseaton towards South Shields	Yellow line	Cullercoats towards St James
Location
- Location within Tyne and Wear

Whitley Bay is a Tyne and Wear Metro station, serving the coastal town of Whitley Bay, North Tyneside in Tyne and Wear, England. It joined the network on 11 August 1980, following the opening of the first phase of the network, between Haymarket and Tynemouth via Four Lane Ends.

== History ==
In 1860, the Blyth and Tyne Railway opened the line from Tynemouth to Dairy House Junction, situated south of the village of Hartley in Northumberland. The original station serving the coastal town was named Whitley, and was located around 600 metres (660 yd) west of the present station. However, this station was only open for four years, being closed in June 1864 and replaced by a station to the north, adjacent to the present day station at Monkseaton.

On 3 July 1882, the North Eastern Railway opened the coastal route between Monkseaton and Tynemouth, replacing the inland Blyth and Tyne Railway route. A new station, designed by William Bell, was opened the same year. Also known as Whitley, the station was renamed Whitley Bay on 1 July 1899.

From 1904, the station was served by the electric trains of the North Eastern Railway. The electric services became so popular with people living in Whitley Bay and travelling to Newcastle to work, and also with those visiting the town for a day out or a holiday, that a new station became a necessity. The new building opened in October 1910. Architectural historian Nikolaus Pevsner later said of the building that it "(lends) some distinction to an undistinguished neighbourhood".

The Tyneside Electrics were withdrawn by British Rail in 1967, and replaced by diesel multiple unit trains. The diesel trains provided a slower service, and trains called at intervals of every 30 minutes instead of every 20, although a limited-stop express service also called every hour.

In preparation for its second conversion to electric train operation, this time to join the Tyne and Wear Metro system, the station lost its services towards Newcastle via Monkseaton on 23 January 1978, and was closed completely on 10 September 1979. It reopened on 11 August 1980, the first day of Metro service. The main changes involved in the station's conversion were shortening of the train shed at each end of the platforms and replacement of the original footbridge.

The station's main building and train shed were given Grade II listed building status in 1986. In 2025, the historic canopy was restored to its former glory with the installation of 1,296 new panes of glass and the strengthening and repainting of the steelwork.

== Facilities ==
The station has two platforms, both of which have ticket machines (which accept cash, card and contactless payment), smartcard validators, seating, next train audio and visual displays, timetable and information posters and an emergency help point. There is step-free access to both platforms by accessible footbridge, with platforms also linked by a second footbridge, which replaced the original with latticework sides. The station has free car park, with 76 spaces. There is also cycle storage at the station, with eight cycle lockers and eight cycle pods.

== Services ==
As of April 2021, the station is served by up to five trains per hour on weekdays and Saturday, and up to four trains per hour during the evening and on Sunday between South Shields and St James via Whitley Bay. (Note: Prior to 12 December 2005, services operated between South Hylton and St James via Whitley Bay.)

== Art ==
- The station features the Passing (1983) art installation. Designed by Ian Patience, it is located in the entrance hall to the westbound platform. It depicts a family on a day trip to the beach, and also shows a nocturnal seascape in the central panel.
