= Tynemouth Metro station =

Metro station in Tyne and Wear, England

Tynemouth
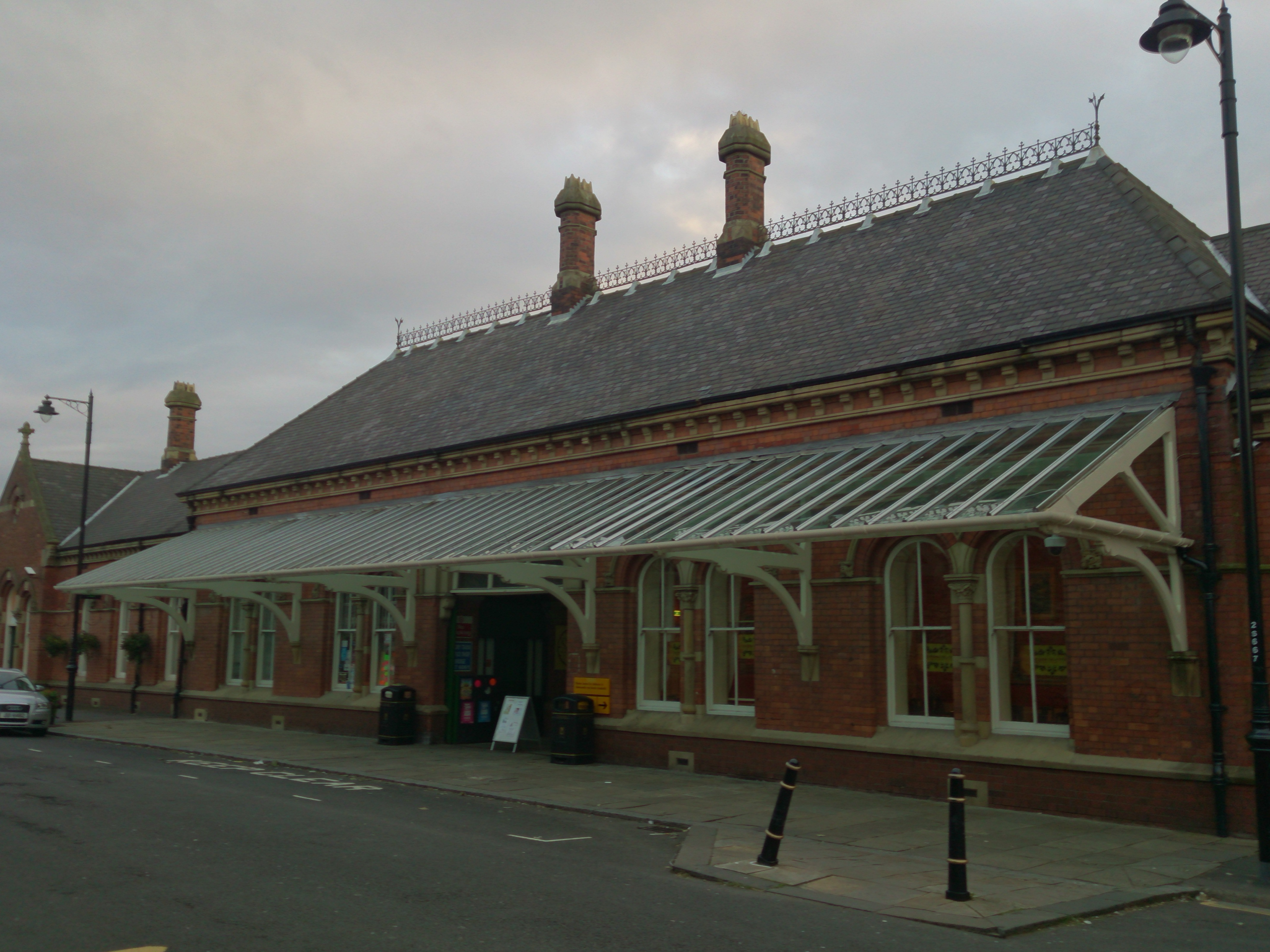
- The station in 2013

General information
- Location: Tynemouth, North Tyneside; England
- Coordinates: 55°01′01″N 1°25′44″W
- Grid reference: NZ368693
- System: Tyne and Wear Metro station
- Transit authority: Tyne and Wear PTE
- Platforms: 2
- Tracks: 2

Construction
- Parking: 71 spaces
- Cycle facilities: 4 cycle racks; 5 Sheffield stands
- Accessible: Step-free access to platform

Other information
- Station code: TYN
- Fare zone: C

History
- Original company: North Eastern Railway
- Pre-grouping: North Eastern Railway
- Post-grouping: London and North Eastern Railway; British Rail (North Eastern Region)

Key dates
- 7 July 1882: Opened
- 11 August 1980: Joined the Tyne and Wear Metro network (Note: Through services to St James via Wallsend commenced on 14 November 1982.)

Passengers
- 2024/25: 1.220 million

Services
Preceding station	Tyne and Wear Metro	Following station
Cullercoats towards South Shields via Whitley Bay	Yellow line	North Shields towards St James

Listed Building – Grade II*
- Official name: Tynemouth station main and subsidiary buildings with canopies and footbridge
- Designated: 2 November 1978
- Reference no.: 1185168
Location
- Location within Tyne and Wear

Tynemouth is a Tyne and Wear Metro station, serving the coastal town of Tynemouth, North Tyneside in Tyne and Wear, England. It joined the network as a terminus station on 11 August 1980, following the opening of the first phase of the network, between Haymarket and Tynemouth via Four Lane Ends.

== History ==
The station, designed by architect William Bell, was originally opened by the North Eastern Railway on 7 July 1882.

Following a significant decline in the number of passengers using the North Eastern Railway's services in North Tyneside during the early 1900s, the line was electrified as part of the Tyneside Electrics network, using a 600 V DC third-rail system.

Owing to falling passenger numbers during the 1960s, as well as rising costs, and the need to renew life expired infrastructure and rolling stock, the Tyneside Electrics network was de-electrified and converted to diesel multiple unit operation in 1967.

It was designated a Grade II* listed building on 2 November 1978.

The station has remained in constant use since opening, with British Rail continuing to use the station's former bay platforms for services from Newcastle via Wallsend until the day before the first section of the Tyne and Wear Metro opened.

Tynemouth joined the Tyne and Wear Metro network on 11 August 1980, with the opening of the first phase of the network between Haymarket and Tynemouth via Four Lane Ends. Prior to the introduction of through services to St James via Wallsend on 14 November 1982, all trains used the present platform 2.

== Regeneration ==
In 2007 English Heritage placed the station on the Heritage at Risk Register. The survey is used by national and local government, a wide range of individuals and heritage groups to establish the extent of risk and to help assess priorities for action and funding decisions.

Work on the £3.68 million regeneration project began in early 2011, and was completed in the following year. On 2 July 2012, the station was officially reopened by Anne, Princess Royal, and subsequently removed from the register.

== Facilities ==
The station has two platforms, both of which have ticket machines (which accept cash, card and contactless payment), seating, next train audio and visual displays, timetable and information posters and an emergency help point.

There is step-free access to both platforms by road bridge, with platforms also linked by a pre-grouping wooden footbridge, which is similar in design to that at nearby Cullercoats.

The station has a pay and display car park, with 71 spaces. There is also cycle storage at the station, with four cycle pods and five Sheffield stands.

== Services ==
As of April 2021, the station is served by up to five trains per hour on weekdays and Saturday, and up to four trains per hour during the evening and on Sunday.

== Market ==
A weekly market is held at the station every Saturday and Sunday, which doubles as a farmers' market once a month. The Friends of Tynemouth Station also hold book fairs several times a year at the station. The first book fair took place in August 1993.

== See also ==
- Grade II* listed buildings in Tyne and Wear
