= St James Metro station =

Tyne and Wear Metro station in Newcastle upon Tyne

St James
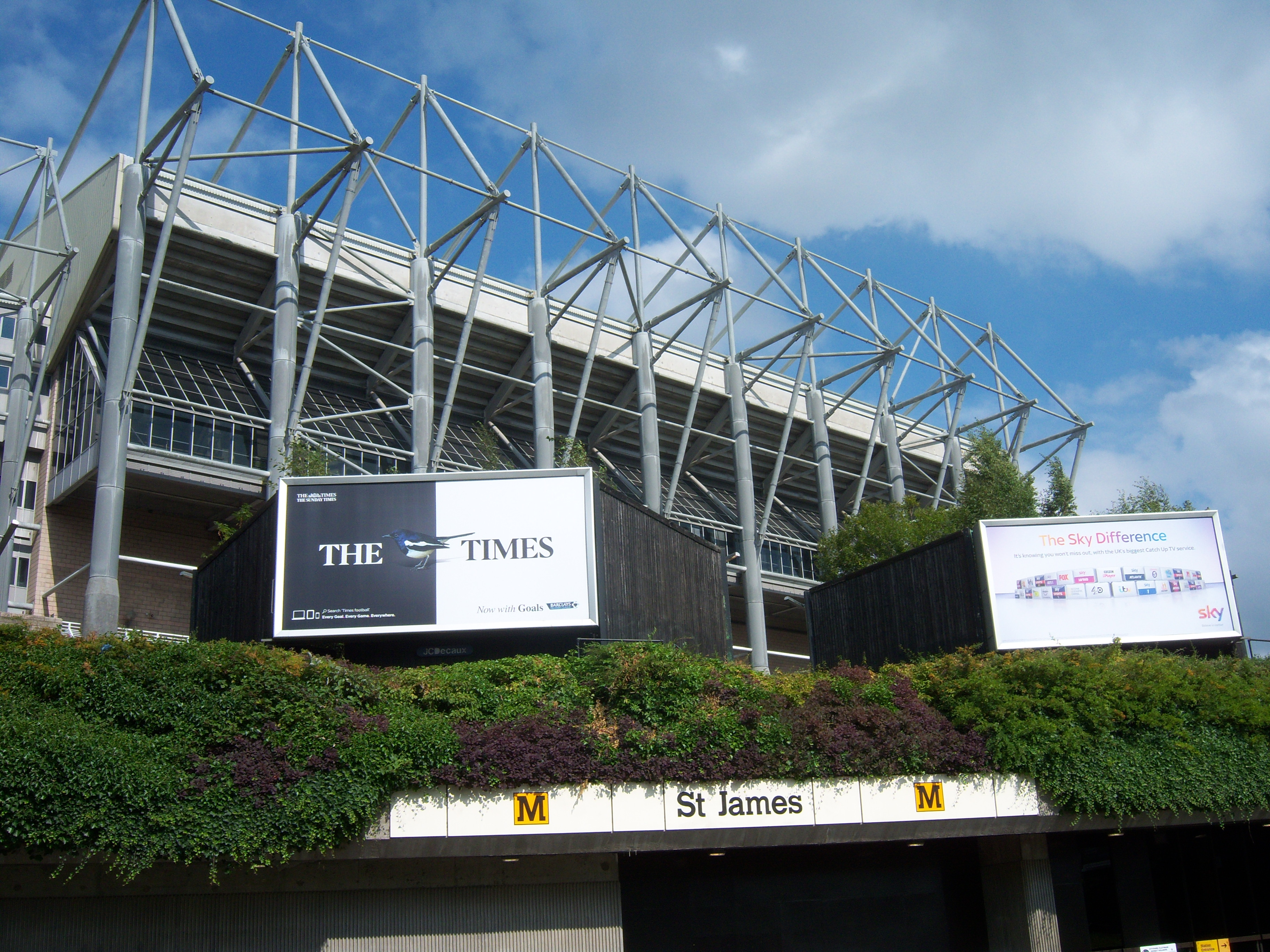

General information
- Location: St James' Park, Newcastle upon Tyne; England
- Coordinates: 54°58′28″N 1°37′16″W
- Grid reference: NZ243644
- System: Tyne and Wear Metro station
- Transit authority: Tyne and Wear PTE
- Platforms: 2
- Tracks: 2

Construction
- Parking: 345 spaces
- Cycle facilities: 5 cycle pods
- Accessible: Step-free access to platform

Other information
- Station code: SJM
- Fare zone: A

History
- Original company: Tyne and Wear Metro

Key dates
- 14 November 1982: Opened

Passengers
- 2024/25: 0.486 million

Services
Preceding station	Tyne and Wear Metro	Following station
Monument towards South Shields via Whitley Bay	Yellow line	Terminus
Location
- Location within Newcastle-upon-Tyne Location within Tyne and Wear

St James is a Tyne and Wear Metro station, serving St James' Park, Newcastle upon Tyne in Tyne and Wear, England. It joined the network as a terminus station on 14 November 1982, following the opening of the fourth phase of the network, between Tynemouth and St James via Wallsend.

== History ==
The station is situated below St James' Park – the home of Newcastle United Football Club. The interior of the station is decorated in black and white stripes (the colours of Newcastle United F.C.), featuring images depicting players and managers from the past and present. When the station was first opened, it was finished in the same colour scheme as other stations on the network – cream and cadmium yellow.

== Facilities ==
Step-free access is available at all stations across the Tyne and Wear Metro network, with two lifts providing step-free access to platforms at St. James. As part of the Metro: All Change programme, new lifts were installed at St. James in 2013, with new escalators installed in 2016. The station is equipped with ticket machines, seating, next train information displays, timetable posters, and an emergency help point on both platforms. Ticket machines are able to accept payment with credit and debit card (including contactless payment), notes and coins. The station is fitted with automatic ticket barriers, which were installed at 13 stations across the network during the early 2010s, as well as smartcard validators, which feature at all stations.

A pay and display car park (operated by Newcastle City Council) is available, with 345 spaces, as well as a taxi rank. There is also the provision for cycle parking, with five cycle pods available for use.

== Services ==
As of April 2021, the station is served by up to five trains per hour on weekdays and Saturday, and up to four trains per hour during the evening and on Sunday.
