= Heaton railway station =

Former railway station in England

Heaton
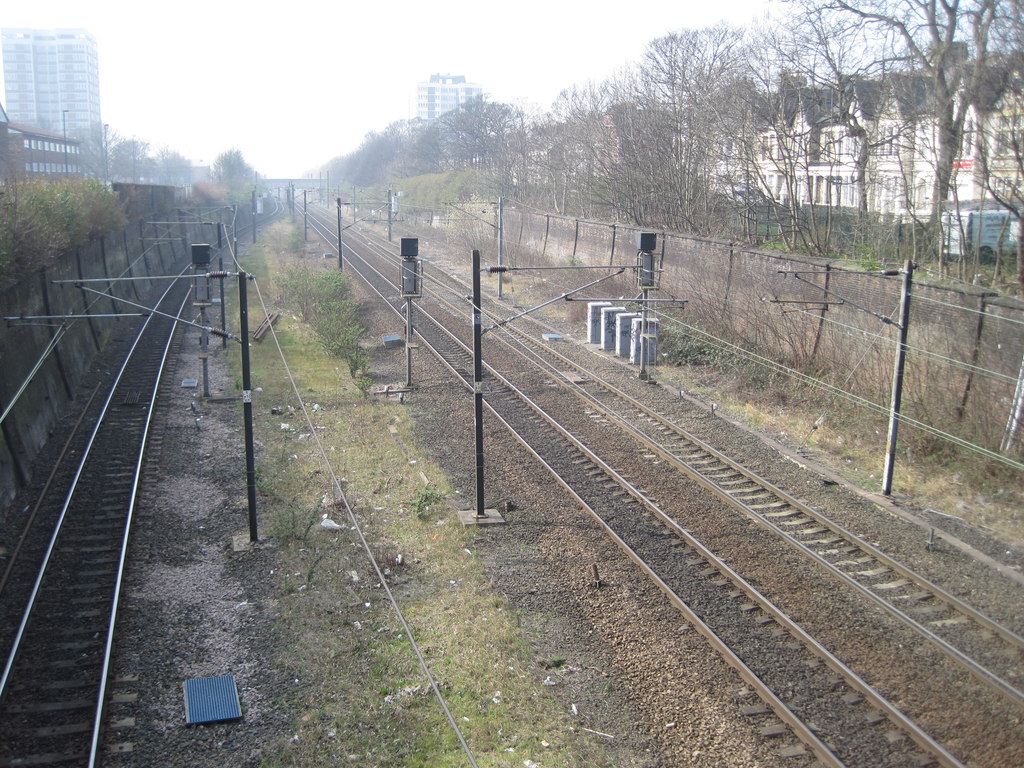
- Site of the second station in 2012

General information
- Location: Heaton, Newcastle upon Tyne; England
- Coordinates: 54.9799°N 1.5817°W
- Grid reference: NZ2687065113
- Platforms: 2 (4 from 1887)

Other information
- Status: Disused

History
- Original company: Newcastle and North Shields Railway
- Pre-grouping: North Eastern Railway
- Post-grouping: LNER; British Rail (North Eastern)

Key dates
- Before 1856: First station opened
- 1 April 1887: First station closed; second station opened
- 11 August 1980: Second station closed
Location

Heaton railway station was a railway station in Newcastle upon Tyne, England, near the southern boundary of Heaton with Byker. The station was built in the nineteenth century and closed on 11 August 1980.

== History ==
In 1839 the Newcastle and Shields railway was opened and this line later became the direct line to the coast from Newcastle upon Tyne, although at that time the line terminated in Carliol Square and not at Newcastle Central station. This predecessor of the North Eastern Railway company (NER) shared those two tracks up to Heaton Junction and "on the 1st July 1847 Newcastle was connected by rail with Berwick, and thus placed on the main line between Edinburgh and London." The railway line and station at Heaton were built in a cutting.

=== First station ===
The first station stood in a cutting on the double track shared by the main line to Edinburgh and the Newcastle & North Shields route. There were two platforms about 100 yards (90 m) in length. The principal building stood on the down (NW) platform, facing a smaller building on the up platform. When it opened the station stood in a rural location, the nearest village being Byker Hill, about ¼ mile to the east, but during the later decades of the 19th century the terraces of the residential suburb of Heaton began to fill the fields on both sides of the railway. In 1887 the line from Newcastle Central station to Heaton Junction was widened from two tracks to four tracks. The original station was demolished and a new station built further to the west of Heaton Road.

=== Second station ===
In 1887 the line from Newcastle Central Station to Heaton Junction was widened from two tracks to four tracks. The two tracks to the north were for mainline services to Edinburgh and the two southern tracks for the direct services from Newcastle Central Station to the coast. These two southern tracks were electrified in 1904. There were two island platforms about 210 yards (190 m) long reached by ramps from the ticket offices, which were at ground level alongside the road bridge carrying Heaton Road over the railway. Heaton Junction signal box was about 250 yards (230 m) to the east and gave access from all four tracks to Heaton engine shed and carriage sidings.

The station was used principally for services on the direct line from Newcastle Central station to the coast but with some local services such as the line to Morpeth on the main line and some mainline services on the line from Newcastle to Edinburgh Waverley.

=== Tyne & Wear Metro ===
The Tyne & Wear Metro did not use that section of line which included Heaton railway station and the station became redundant when the Metro was built. Metro train services are now available from Byker Metro station which is about 1/4 mile (0.4 km) to the south, and Chillingham Road Metro station about 1/4 mile (0.4 km) to the northeast.

=== East Coast Main Line ===
When the East Coast Main Line (ECML) was electrified the opportunity was taken to rationalise the track work in many places including the section from Newcastle Central Station to the carriage sidings at Heaton. The station platforms at Heaton were demolished and the previous four tracks were replaced with three tracks, each signalled for running in either direction. The electrification was completed in 1990. Owing to the positioning of the bridge piers for the road bridge over the line the southernmost track still follows the alignment around the now non-existent platform.

== See also ==
- East Coast Main Line
- Newcastle and North Shields Railway
- North Eastern Railway
- Tyne and Wear Metro
- Tyneside Electrics

Preceding station	Historical railways	Following station
Manors; Line and station open	North Eastern Railway; Tyneside Electrics (North Tyneside Loop)	Walkergate; Line closed, station open
Manors; Line and station open	North Eastern Railway; York, Newcastle and Berwick Railway	Forest Hall; Line open, station closed
