= Jesmond station =

Jesmond station may refer to:

- Jesmond Metro station, a station on the Tyne and Wear Metro in Jesmond, Newcastle upon Tyne, England, UK
- Jesmond railway station, a former railway station (and current pub) in Jesmond, Newcastle upon Tyne, England, UK

== See also ==
- West Jesmond station, a former railway station and current metro station in Jesmond, Newcastle upon Tyne, England, UK
