= Manors station =

Manors station may refer to one of two stations in Newcastle-upon-Tyne, England:

- Manors railway station
- Manors Metro station
