= Carliol Square railway station =

Disused railway station in Newcastle upon Tyne, Tyne and Wear

Coordinates: 54.9723°N 1.6071°W

Carliol Square

General information
- Location: Newcastle upon Tyne, Tyne and Wear; England
- Platforms: 2

Other information
- Status: Disused

History
- Original company: Newcastle and North Shields Railway
- Pre-grouping: York, Newcastle and Berwick Railway

Key dates
- 22 June 1839: Opened
- 30 August 1850: Closed

Carliol Square railway station served the city of Newcastle upon Tyne, Tyne and Wear, England, from 1839 to 1850 on the Newcastle and North Shields Railway.

== History ==
The station opened on 22 June 1839 by the Newcastle and North Shields Railway. It was the southern terminus of the line until Newcastle Central opened on 30 August 1850.

Preceding station	Historical railways	Following station
Manors; Line and station closed	Newcastle and North Shields Railway	Terminus
