= West Jesmond Metro station =

Tyne and Wear Metro station in Newcastle upon Tyne

West Jesmond
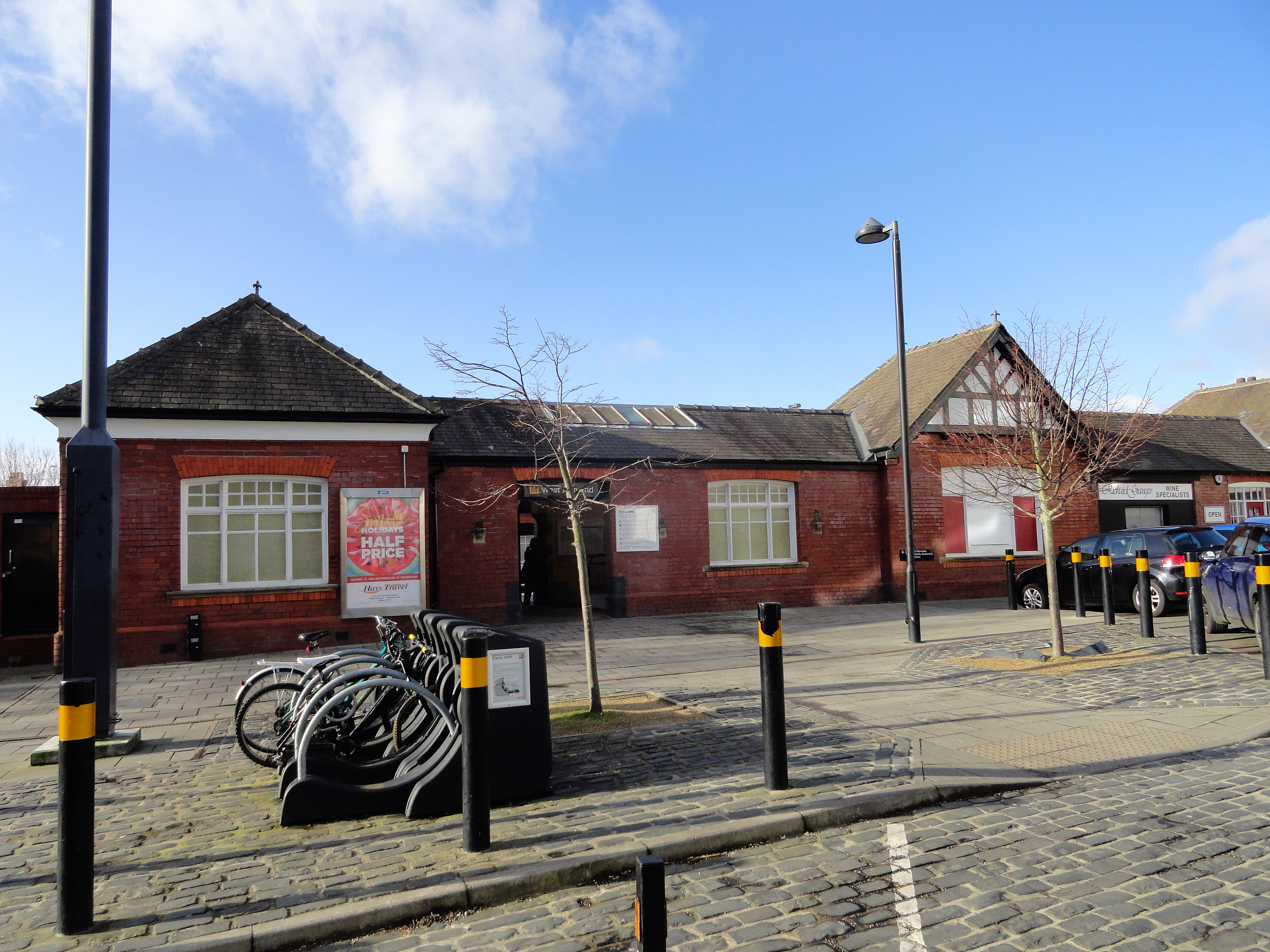

General information
- Location: Lyndhurst Avenue, Jesmond, NE2; Newcastle upon Tyne; England
- Coordinates: 54.9936°N 1.6098°W
- OS Grid ref: NZ 2506 6663
- System: Tyne and Wear Metro
- Owner: Nexus
- Lines: Green line; Yellow line
- Platforms: 2
- Tracks: 2

Construction
- Structure type: Surface level
- Cycle facilities: 5 cycle pods, with space for 10 bikes
- Accessible: Step-free access to platforms, with level-boarding to Class 555 trains

Other information
- Status: Staffed intermittently
- Station code: WJS
- Fare zone: A

History
- Original company: North Eastern Railway
- Post-grouping: London and North Eastern Railway; British Rail (North Eastern Region); British Rail (Eastern Region)

Key dates
- 1 December 1900: Opened
- 23 August 1978: Closed for Metro conversion
- 11 August 1980: Re-opened as a Metro station

Passengers
- 2020/21: ▼304,604
- 2021/22: ▲1.362 million
- 2022/23: ▲1.520 million
- 2023/24: ▲1.660 million
- 2024/25: ▲1.793 million

Services
Preceding station	Tyne and Wear Metro	Following station
Jesmond towards South Hylton	Green line	Ilford Road towards Airport
Jesmond towards South Shields	Yellow line	Ilford Road towards St James via Whitley Bay
Location
- Location within Newcastle-upon-Tyne Location within Tyne and Wear
Notes
- Metro passenger statistics from Nexus.

West Jesmond is a Tyne and Wear Metro station, and former British Rail station, serving the suburb of Jesmond in the English city of Newcastle upon Tyne. It was originally opened on 1 December 1900 by the North Eastern Railway, and became part of the Tyne and Wear Metro on 11 August 1980.

== History ==
The station was opened on 1 December 1900 by the North Eastern Railway on the route of its Blyth and Tyne line that had opened 36 years earlier. The station was built in response to the spread of terraced housing in the area, to the east of Town Moor.

The station had two side platforms, linked by an underground pedestrian subway and with the principal buildings on the east side and a waiting room on the west side. The buildings were single-story, in red brick, and the principal building had a central ridged gable with hipped roof pavilions at either end. The platforms originally had glass awnings to shelter passengers, but these were removed in the 1970s, although the remnants can still be seen attached to the station buildings.

For the first few years after its opening, the station was served by an irregular steam service, but the line was electrified shortly afterwards, using a 600 V DC third rail system, and on 29 March 1904, a frequent electric service was initiated. Initially, electric trains operated only from New Bridge Street to Benton station, but in stages, electrification was extended, and a new link into Newcastle Central was built, so that by 1909 services could run from Newcastle Central to Newcastle Central via the coast and West Jesmond, creating the North Tyneside Loop.

In 1967, the North Tyneside Loop was de-electrified, with the last electric train running on 17 June 1967. The replacement diesel trains provided a slower and less frequent service, and this loss was one of the driving factors for the eventual creation of the Tyne and Wear Metro. The station closed on 23 January 1978 for conversion to the new system. The original station buildings were retained, but the platforms were shortened, with a new accessible footbridge built over the line.

The station reopened as part of the Tyne and Wear Metro on 11 August 1980, as part of the first phase of the network, between Haymarket and Tynemouth via Four Lane Ends Interchange.

The Metro station was used by 1.793 million passengers in 2024/25, considerably lower than the pre-pandemic figure of 2.048 million in 2018/19.

== Facilities ==
The station has two side platforms, with separate step-free access to both. The southbound platform has level access from Lyndhurst Avenue, whilst the northbound platform has ramped access from Brentwood Avenue. Between platforms, there is a ramped footbridge. There is no dedicated car parking available at this station. There is provision for cycle parking, with five cycle pods available for use for up to 10 bicycles.

The ticket machines accept credit and debit cards (including contactless payment), notes and coins. The station is also fitted with smartcard validators, which feature at all stations across the network.

== Services ==
As of June 2026, the station is served by up to ten trains per hour – five trains in each direction on both of the Yellow and Green lines – on weekdays and Saturdays, and up to eight trains per hour during the evening and on Sundays. In the northbound direction, half the trains run to Newcastle Airport and half to St James via Whitley Bay. In the southbound direction, half the trains run to South Shields and half to South Hylton via Sunderland.
