= Jesmond Metro station =

Tyne and Wear Metro station in Newcastle upon Tyne

Jesmond
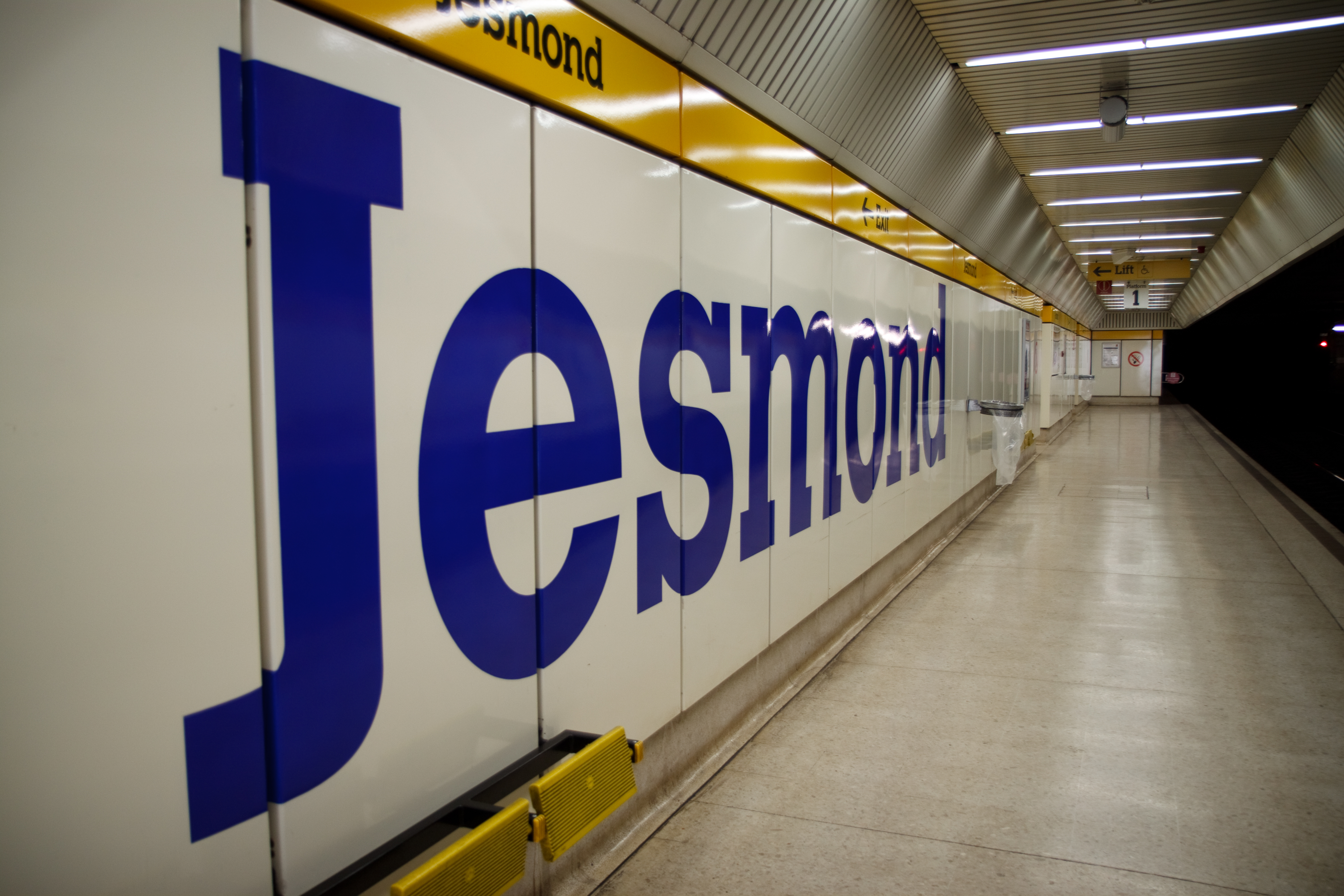
- The southbound platform, pictured in 2010

General information
- Location: Eslington Terrace, Jesmond, NE2; Newcastle upon Tyne; England
- Coordinates: 54.9829°N 1.6056°W
- OS Grid ref: NZ 2534 6544
- System: Tyne and Wear Metro
- Owner: Nexus
- Lines: Green line; Yellow line
- Platforms: 2
- Tracks: 2

Construction
- Structure type: Sub-surface
- Cycle facilities: 5 cycle pods, with space for 10 bikes
- Accessible: Step-free access throughout, with lifts from street-level to platforms and level-boarding to Class 555 trains

Other information
- Status: Staffed intermittently
- Station code: JES
- Fare zone: A

Key dates
- 11 August 1980: Opened

Passengers
- 2020/21: ▼202,152
- 2021/22: ▲875,457
- 2022/23: ▲1.045 million
- 2023/24: ▲1.129 million
- 2024/25: ▲1.161 million

Services
Preceding station	Tyne and Wear Metro	Following station
Haymarket towards South Hylton	Green line	West Jesmond towards Airport
Haymarket towards South Shields	Yellow line	West Jesmond towards St James via Whitley Bay
Location
- Location within Newcastle-upon-Tyne Location within Tyne and Wear
Notes
- Metro passenger statistics from Nexus.

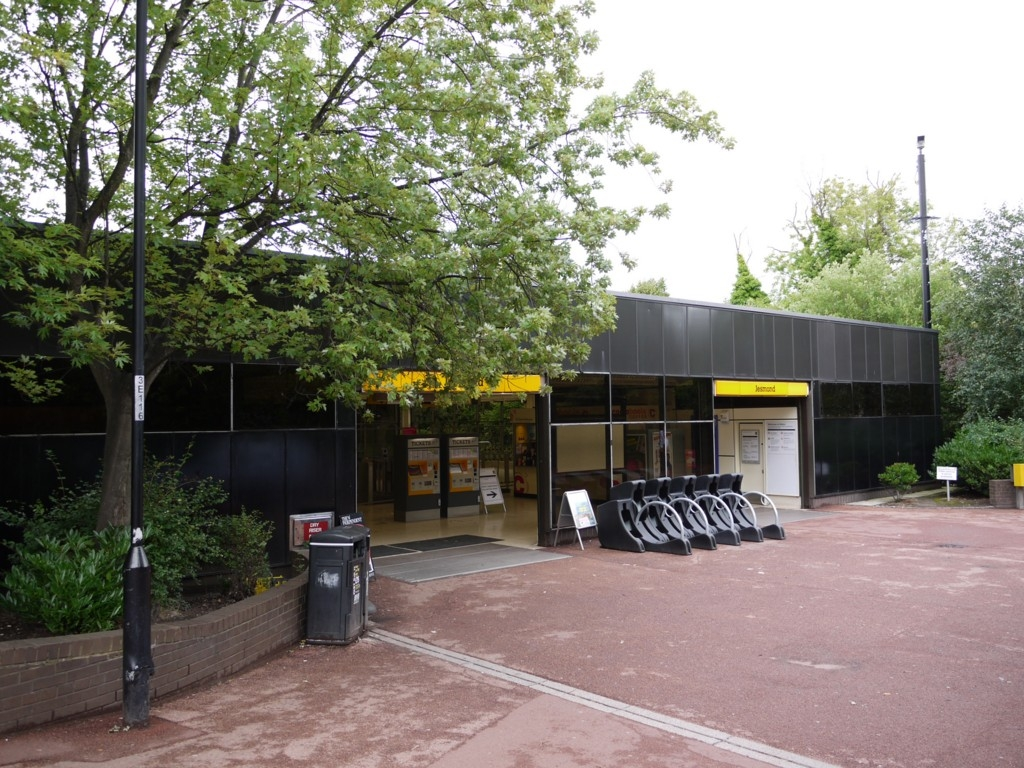
The station entrance, showing the cycle pods

Jesmond is a Tyne and Wear Metro station, serving the suburb of Jesmond, Newcastle upon Tyne in Tyne and Wear, England. It joined the network on 11 August 1980, following the opening of the first phase of the network, between Haymarket and Tynemouth via Four Lane Ends Interchange.

The station is situated some 120 m (130 yd) to the north-west of the former Jesmond station on the Blyth and Tyne Railway and North Tyneside Loop, which closed in preparation for the construction of the Tyne and Wear Metro and is now a pub called The Carriage.

== History ==
Jesmond metro station was built in the late 1970s on a location some 120 m (130 yd) to the north-west of the former Jesmond station on the Blyth and Tyne Railway and North Tyneside Loop. The Tyne and Wear Metro line to South Gosforth station, and beyond, occupies the route of the previous railway from a point just north of the two Jesmond stations, necessitating the closure of the former railway station, which is now a public house called The Carriage.

The Tyne and Wear Metro station was designed by Faulkner-Brown Hendy Watkinson Stonor and L. J. Couves & Partners. It was chosen by Simon Jenkins as one of the top 100 stations in Britain, being described as a "miniature homage to the modernist architect Mies van der Rohe". In the treatment of the roof detailing and glass external walls, there are some similarities to Mies' New National Gallery in Berlin.

Tracks still run through the former station, linking the Tyne and Wear Metro line to the north of Jesmond with the line to the west of Manors. However, this link is only used by empty Metro trains going to and from their depot at South Gosforth, and no trains stop at the old station.

The Metro station was used by 1.161 million passengers in 2024/25, slightly lower than the pre-pandemic figure of 1.290 million in 2018/19.

== Facilities ==
Step-free access is available at all stations across the Tyne and Wear Metro network, with two lifts providing step-free access to platforms at Jesmond. There is no dedicated car parking available at this station. There is the provision for cycle parking, with five cycle pods available for use.

The station is equipped with ticket machines, seating, next train information displays, timetable posters, and an emergency help point on both platforms. The ticket machines accept credit and debit cards (including contactless payment), notes and coins. The station is also fitted with smartcard validators, which feature at all stations across the network.

The station houses a newsagent's shop and coffee kiosk.

== Services ==
As of June 2026, the station is served by up to ten trains per hour – five trains in each direction on both of the Yellow and Green lines – on weekdays and Saturdays, and up to eight trains per hour during the evening and on Sundays. In the northbound direction, half the trains run to Newcastle Airport and half to St James via Whitley Bay. In the southbound direction, half the trains run to South Shields and half to South Hylton via Sunderland.

== Artwork ==
Jesmond station features two installations from Metro's 'Art on Transport' programme.

The Garden Front was commissioned for the station in 1978, and was designed by sculptor Raf Fulcher. It is located in the enclosed space to the rear of the building. It was badly damaged by metal thieves in 2012. Some parts of the sculpture have been lost and others have been put in storage until funds are available to restore the work.

The station also houses Abstract Murals, created by Simon Butler. This artwork was commissioned in 1983, and consists of vitreous enamel panels with brightly coloured geometric shapes.
