= Central Station Metro station =

Tyne and Wear Metro station in Newcastle upon Tyne

Central Station
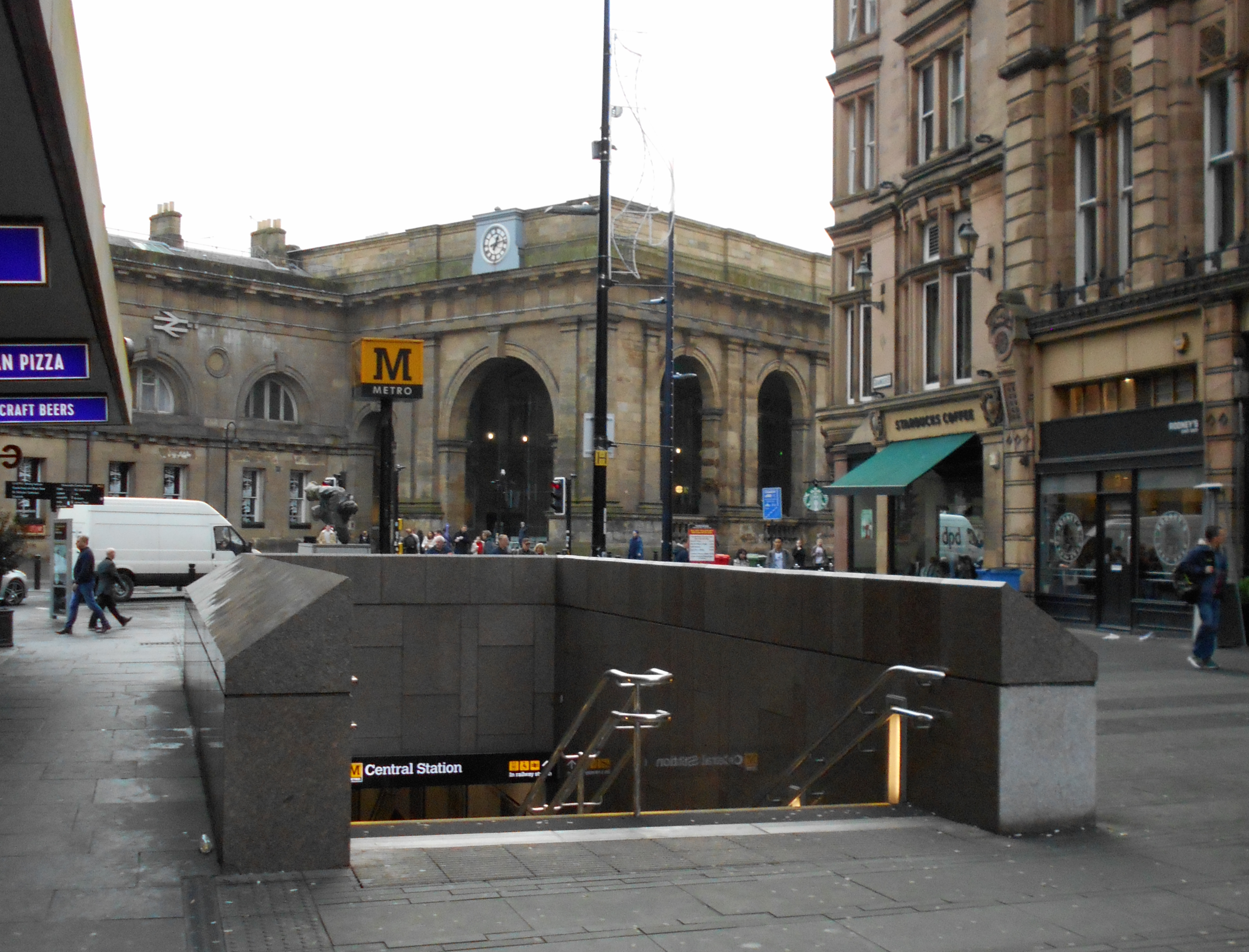
- Station entrance in Grainger Street

General information
- Location: Neville Street, Grainger Town, NE1; Newcastle upon Tyne; England
- Coordinates: 54.9691°N 1.6165°W
- OS Grid ref: NZ 2465 6390
- System: Tyne and Wear Metro
- Owner: Nexus
- Lines: Green line; Yellow line
- Platforms: 2
- Tracks: 2
- Connections: Northumberland Line; National Rail

Construction
- Structure type: Underground
- Cycle facilities: Cycle racks in National Rail station with 174 spaces
- Accessible: Step-free access throughout, with lifts from National Rail station to platforms and level-boarding to trains

Other information
- Status: Staffed intermittently
- Station code: CEN
- Fare zone: A

History
- Original company: Tyne and Wear Metro

Key dates
- 15 November 1981: Opened
- 2017: Refurbished

Passengers
- 2020/21: ▼678,397
- 2021/22: ▲3.212 million
- 2022/23: ▲4.082 million
- 2023/24: ▲4.440 million
- 2024/25: ▼4.365 million

Services
Preceding station	Tyne and Wear Metro	Following station
Gateshead towards South Hylton	Green line	Monument towards Airport
Gateshead towards South Shields	Yellow line	Monument towards St James via Whitley Bay
Location
- Location within Newcastle-upon-Tyne Location within Tyne and Wear
Notes
- Metro passenger statistics from Nexus.

Central Station (also known as Central) is an underground Tyne and Wear Metro station, serving the Grainger Town area of the city of Newcastle upon Tyne in Tyne and Wear, England. It joined the network on 15 November 1981, following the opening of the third phase of the network, between Haymarket and Heworth Interchange. The station is named after Newcastle Central railway station, which stands directly above it.

== History ==
Central Station joined the Tyne and Wear Metro network on 15 November 1981, following the opening of the third phase of the network, between Haymarket and Heworth Interchange.

The station is located below Newcastle Central, the National Rail station from which it gets its name. It is the third-busiest on the network after Monument and Haymarket. The station has entrances from inside the National Rail station, and from both Neveille Street and Grainger Street.

Metro serves as a replacement for some routes that had formerly been operated from the mainline station towards Benton & Tynemouth via the North Tyneside Loop. In 1984, Metro reached South Shields, again replacing British Rail services. In 2002, Metro was extended to South Hylton via Sunderland, where it shares tracks between Pelaw Junction and Sunderland with National Rail services on the Durham Coast Line.

The station was used by 4.365 million passengers in 2024/25, considerably lower than the pre-pandemic figure of 5.400 million in 2018/19.

=== Refurbishment ===
Between September 2015 and March 2017, the station was refurbished – a project costing £6 million.

== Facilities ==
The station has two platforms, seating, next train audio and visual displays, timetable and information posters and an emergency help point. The ticket hall is located on the upper level, with ticket machines (which accept cash, card and contactless payment) and automatic ticket barriers, which were installed at 13 stations across the network during the early 2010s. There is step-free access to both platforms by lift, with platforms also linked by escalator and staircase.

On 8 December 2025, Metro started a trial to provide free wifi in Central Station, allowing passengers to access the internet from platform-level. Central Station is the first station on the Metro to have wifi access.

== Services ==
As of May 2026, the station is served by up to ten trains per hour on weekdays and Saturdays, and up to eight trains per hour during the evening and on Sundays. Additional services operate between Pelaw and Monkseaton at peak times.

== Gallery ==
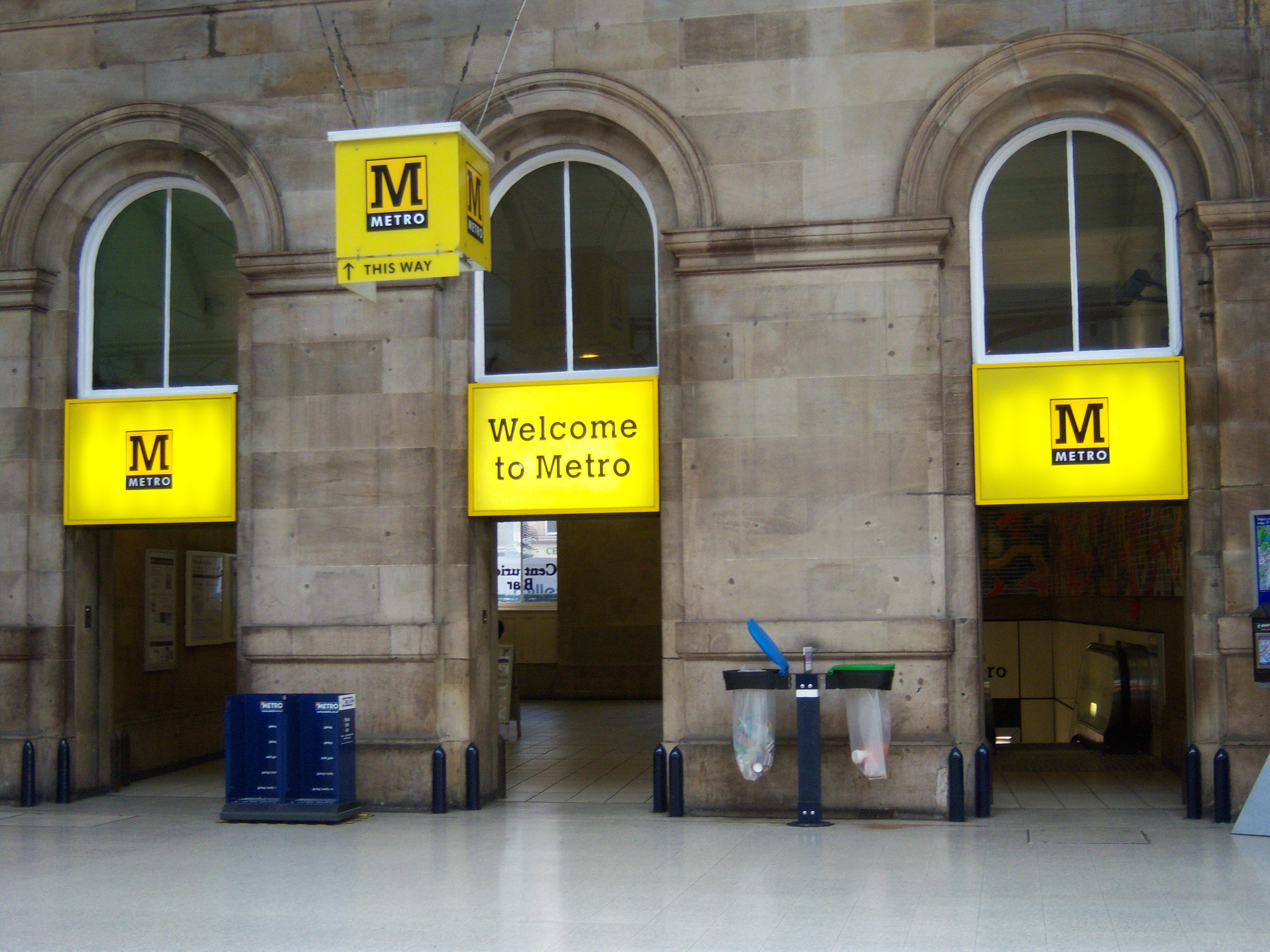
Entrance from inside the National Rail station

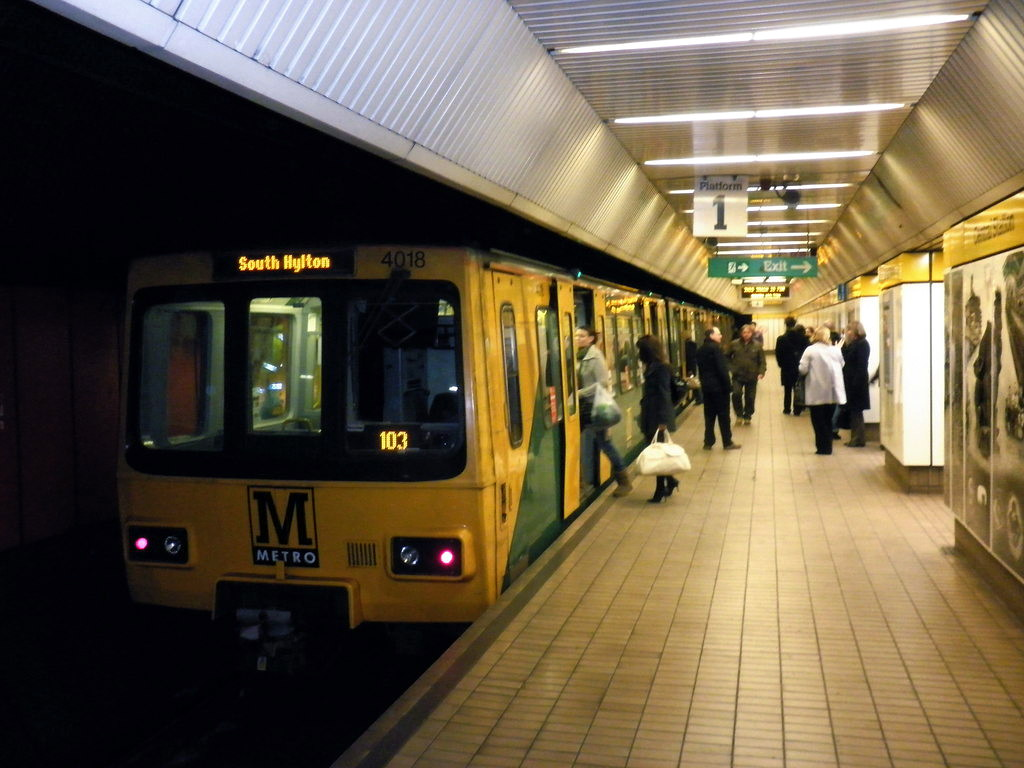
Platform 1, pre-refurbishment

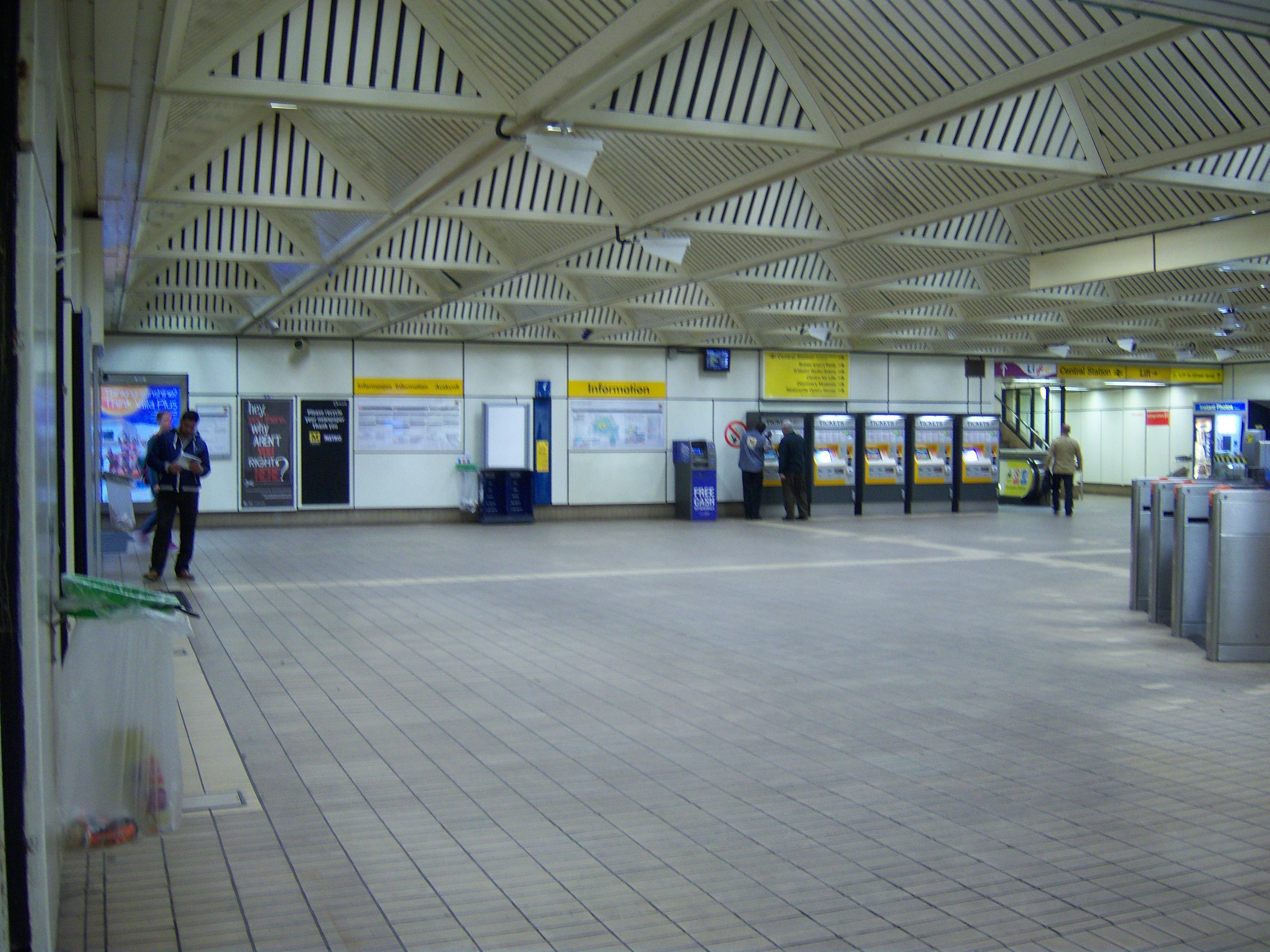
Station concourse
