= Tyneside Electrics =

Defunct electric rail system in England

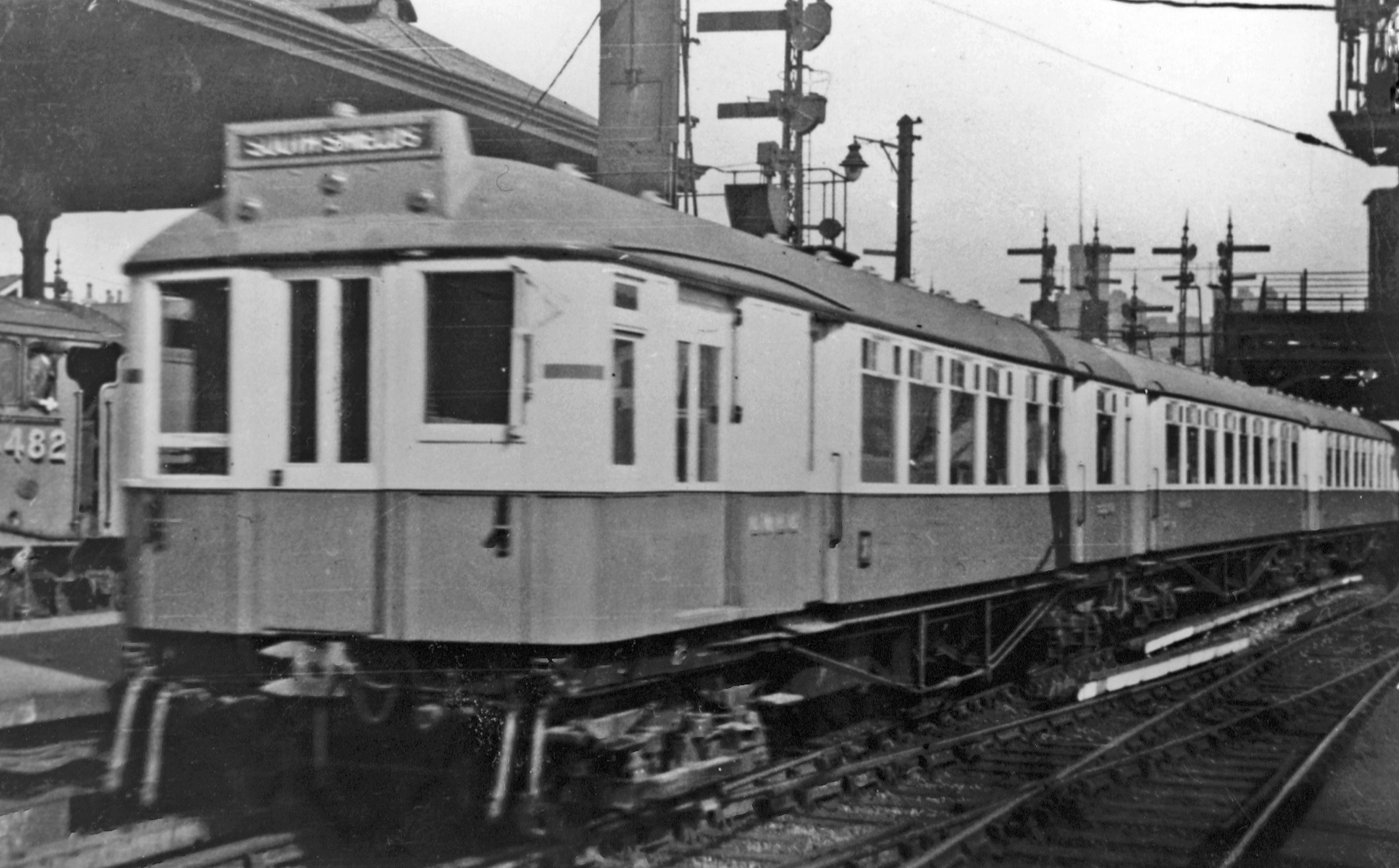
A 1920-built South Tyneside NER electric unit at Newcastle Central station in 1938.

The Tyneside Electrics were the suburban railways on Tyneside that the North Eastern Railway and the London and North Eastern Railway electrified using the third rail system. The North Tyneside Loop was electrified from 1904 onwards and formed one of the earliest suburban electric networks; the South Tyneside line to South Shields via Pelaw was electrified in March 1938. British Railways converted these lines to diesel operation in the 1960s: the line to South Shields in January 1963 and the North Tyneside lines in June 1967 when the electrical supply infrastructure (which dated from 1935) and the rolling stock (which dated from 1937) had become life expired. In addition, the system was losing passengers and suffering from costly vandalism. Since the late 1970s, much of the system has been converted to form the Tyne and Wear Metro.

== Routes ==
The original lines covered were the North Tyneside Loop from Newcastle Central via Wallsend, North Shields, Whitley Bay and South Gosforth back to Newcastle; the East Coast Main Line (ECML) from Newcastle Central to Benton (providing a short cut to Monkseaton and Whitley Bay), and the Riverside Branch from Byker to Percy Main via Walker.

At Benton the electrified lines diverged from the ECML to join the Blyth and Tyne line (see below). These curved lines were called the South West Curve and South East Curve based on their disposition looking north. The SE Curve had scheduled electric services running over it from time to time, but the SW Curve was used for empty stock movements.

In 1923 the triangular junctions at South Gosforth were electrified in connection with opening the new car sheds, but were used only for empty stock movements. In the same year, a route was electrified in the Heaton area. This route left the ECML at Benton Bank and ran through the freight yard at Heaton to connect with the Tynemouth lines at Heaton East Junction. It was used for empty stock movements and as an access route to Walker Gate Carriage Works where heavy repairs and overhaul of the electric stock took place. This route was called the "Heaton Independent Lines".

=== Map ===
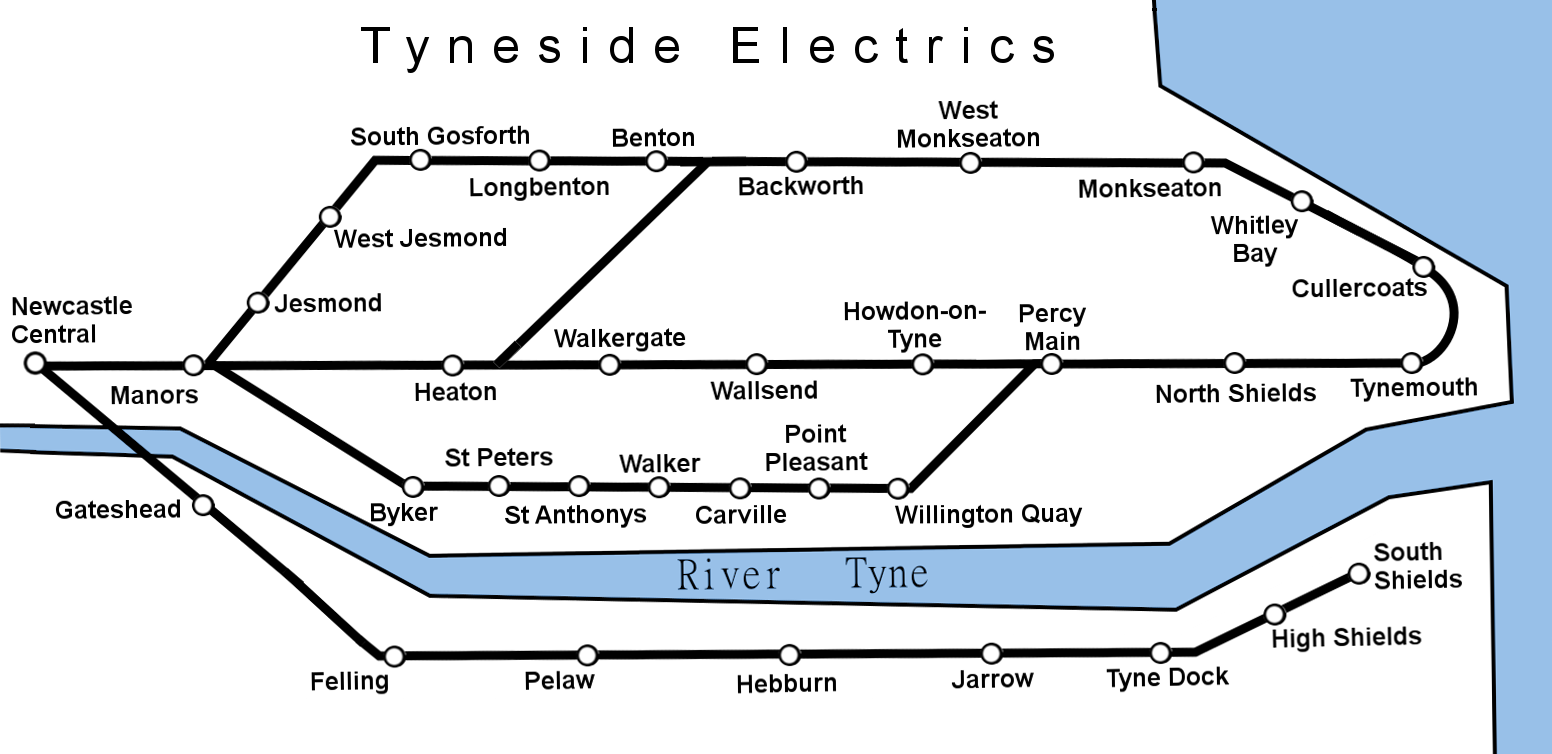
Diagram of the network at its maximum extent during 1938–63.

== History ==
=== History before electrification ===
The line through Jesmond, Benton and on to Tynemouth was opened in the 1860s by the Blyth and Tyne Railway (B&T), and the line through Wallsend by the Newcastle and North Shields Railway in 1839. The portion of the East Coast Main Line to Benton had been opened by the York, Newcastle and Berwick Railway in the 1840s. The Newcastle Quayside Branch had been opened by the NER in 1873, and the Riverside Branch in 1879. The junctions at South Gosforth dated back to 1905 and were laid for the Gosforth and Ponteland Branch.

=== Electrification ===
In the early 1900s, tramway competition caused a large and rapid decline in the number of passengers using the North Eastern Railway's local services in the north Tyneside area. The number of passengers using these services declined from 9,847,000 in 1901, to 5,887,000 in 1903. In 1903, in response to this, and in an effort to win back the lost passengers, the NER decided to electrify their suburban network north of the River Tyne with a 600 Volt DC third-rail system. They hired the electrical engineer Charles H. Merz as a consultative engineer for the project, and contracted the British Thomson-Houston company to supply the electrical equipment.

The North Tyneside Loop, including the Riverside Branch, and a short stretch of the East Coast Main Line was electrified in stages between February and July 1904. The original electrified route was not quite a loop however, as the northern leg of the route ran over the former Blyth and Tyne Railway, whose Newcastle terminus was at New Bridge Street; an isolated terminus with no rail connection to Newcastle Central, meaning services initially ran from Newcastle Central via Tynemouth to New Bridge Street. In 1909, New Bridge Street was closed, and a connection was constructed to an extended Manors station, in order to create a full loop, however despite this. it was not until 1917 that a full Central to Central loop service began.

The electrified stretch of the East Coast Main Line between Heaton and Benton Junction was used by certain limited stop 'express' services between Newcastle and the coast.

The electrification, and the improved service it enabled, succeeded in the aim of reversing the decline in passengers numbers, which rose steadily, and topped the ten million mark in 1913, exceeding the highest pre-electrification totals. It also substantially reduced the running cost of the service, which was reduced to less than half the cost per train mile of the steam service it replaced.

In 1923, the NER was grouped into the London and North Eastern Railway (LNER). Electrification of the South Tyneside line from Newcastle to South Shields was announced by the LNER in 1935 and electric services began in the spring of 1938.

=== Decline and de-electrification ===
Falling passenger numbers, rising costs, and the need to renew life expired infrastructure and rolling stock, meant that the Tyneside Electric network was de-electrified in the 1960s under British Rail, and converted to diesel operation. The Newcastle-South Shields line was de-electrified in 1963, and the north Tyneside routes were de-electrified in 1967.

=== Successor ===
In the late-1970s much of the former Tyneside Electric network was incorporated, in modified form, into the Tyne and Wear Metro: The North Tyneside Loop (minus the Riverside Branch which was closed in 1973), plus the South Shields branch was incorporated into the Metro. A new underground section under Newcastle and Gateshead and new bridges were added, part of the former Ponteland Branch was also included, and the network was re-electrified with overhead lines.

== Rolling stock ==
=== North Eastern Railway ===
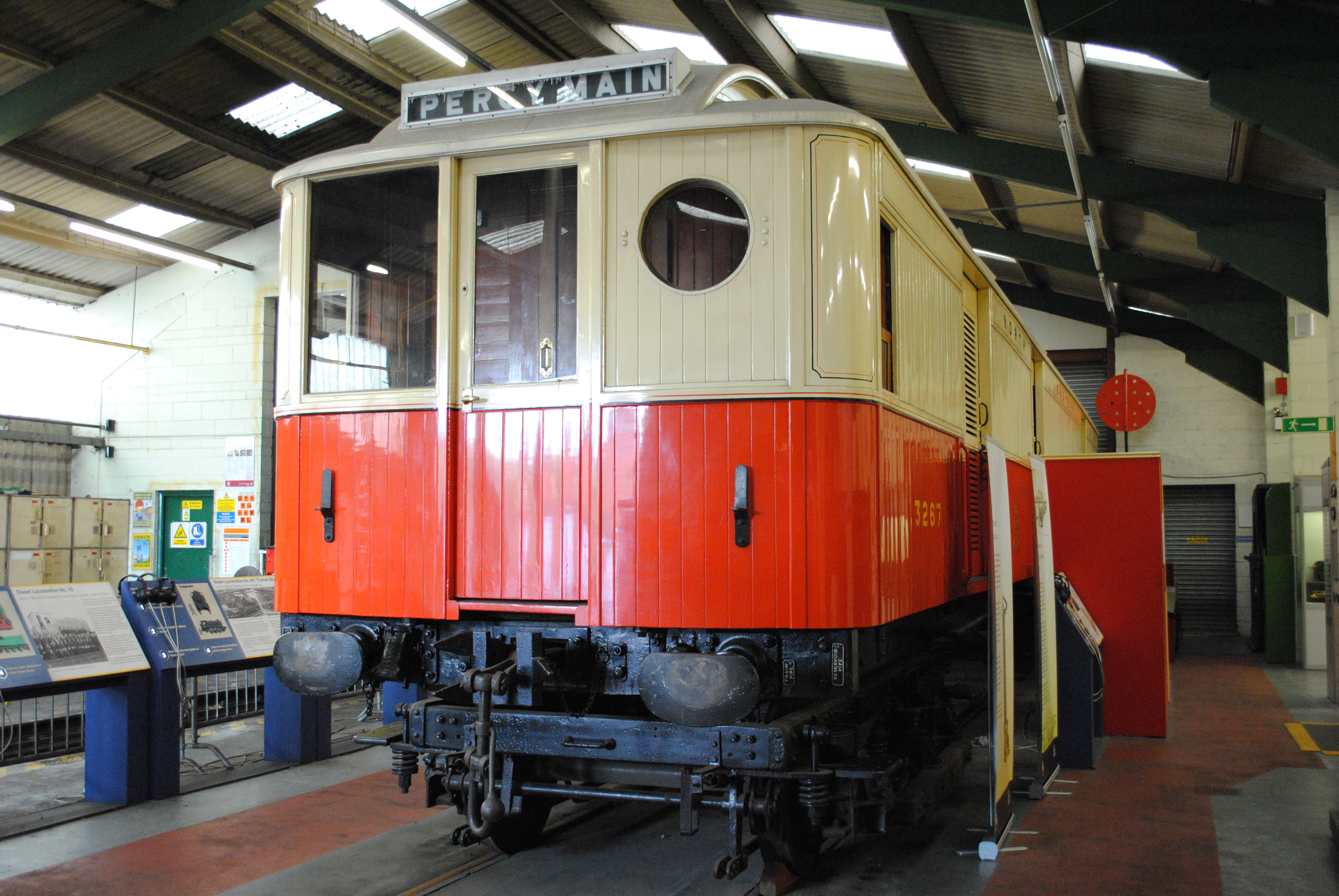
Preserved 1904 NER electric Motor Parcel Van No. 3267 in the Stephenson Railway Museum

The North Eastern Railway began using electric multiple units between New Bridge Street and Benton on 29 March 1904 and from 25 July 1904 over the entire route from Newcastle Central via Percy Main to Tynemouth, returning to New Bridge Street via Jesmond. The railway was electrified with a third rail at 600 V DC. One hundred electric multiple unit cars, built in NER's York workshop, were equipped by British Thompson-Houston (BTH) with BTH and Westinghouse equipment. Two motor parcels vans were used with passenger coaches on workman's trains. In 1909-15 an additional 11 motor cars and 11 trailers were built.

On Sunday 11 August 1918 there was a serious fire at the original car shed at Walkergate, which completely destroyed 34 cars and damaged many more. An order for 35 replacement cars was placed and these were built between 1920 and 1922. These were to a different design, with elliptical roofline and more powerful motors. As of July 2012 a powered parcels van built in 1904 is in the National Railway Museum collection and on loan to the Stephenson Railway Museum.

This fire affected rolling stock policy for the rest of the life of the system through to 1967. When the original cars were life-expired in the 1930s, the replacement cars of 1920–22 were not, so while new LNER units were built to replace all the stock then in use, the 1920–22 cars were moved on to the newly electrified South Shields line, whose commissioning in 1938 coincided with the arrival of the new LNER stock. In turn, this meant the 1920–22 cars were life-expired in the 1950s, when what was standard electric stock of the time, to the Southern Region pattern with separate compartments, quite different (and to some extent inappropriate) with what had existed before was built. In the early 1960s, the ability to redeploy this quite recent stock to the Southern Region was a significant part of the decision to de-electrify the South Shields line, which they had been principally employed on, leaving the north side lines to run on with the LNER units until they too were life expired some years later and the electric system was closed down.

=== London and North Eastern Railway ===
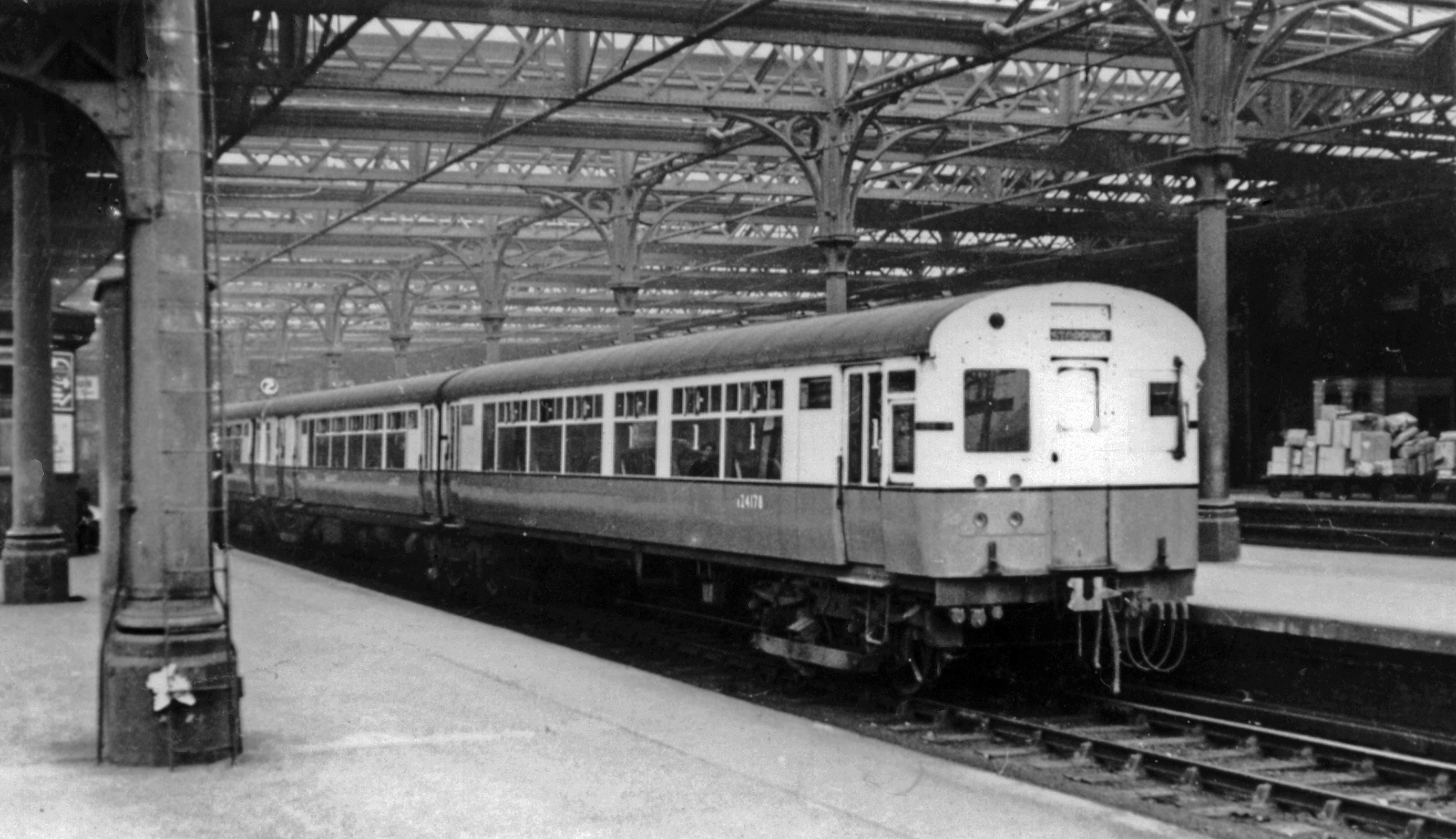
A 1937 LNER unit at Newcastle Central in 1950.

The NER stock remained in service with the LNER after the 1923 grouping. In 1937 the newest ex-NER stock, built in 1920 to replace those vehicles lost in the 1918 fire, was refurbished for use on the newly electrified South Tyneside line. The other NER stock, some of which dated back to 1903–04 was replaced on the North Tyneside lines by new articulated units built by Metropolitan Cammell.

=== British Railways ===
The LNER 1937 stock remained in service with British Railways (BR) after nationalisation in 1948. In 1955 BR introduced new stock on the South Tyneside line based on the Southern Region 2–EPB stock and was designated "South Tyneside 1951 Stock". They were electrically identical to the 2–EPB but the body on the motor brake cars had a much larger luggage space to accommodate prams. Minor detail differences were route indicating lights and destination blinds. The 1920 stock was withdrawn and was broken up at Simonside Wagon Works near Tyne Dock in the period 1956–58, although some vehicles were retained for departmental use or saw further service as "Pram Vans".

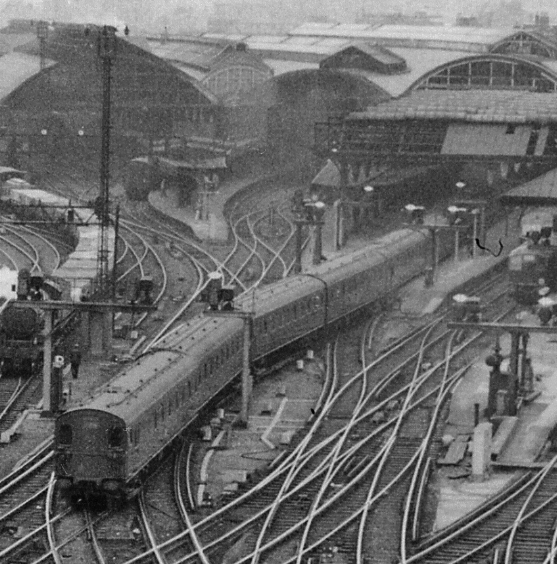
British Rail 2–EPB train at Newcastle Central in 1960.

When the South Tyneside line was de-electrified in January 1963, all but one of the 1951 EPB stock was transferred to the Southern Region. The exception was Motor Parcels Van E68000 which was transferred to the London Midland Region's Liverpool – Southport line, renumbered M68000 and used for another five years before being withdrawn in 1968. It thus had a service life of just 12 years.

== Sources ==
- Hennessey, R.A.S. (1970). The Electric Railway That Never Was – York–Newcastle 1919. Oriel Press. pp. not cited. ISBN 0-85362-087-3.
- Hoole, K (1961). The North Eastern Electrics. Oakwood Press.
- Hoole, K (1987). The North Eastern Electrics (2nd ed.). Oakwood Press. ISBN 0-85361-358-3.
- Hoole, K (1988). The Electric Locomotives of the North Eastern Railway. Oakwood Press. pp. not cited. ISBN 0-85361-367-2.
