= Newcastle New Bridge Street railway station =

Closed railway station in Newcastle-upon-Tyne, UK

Newcastle New Bridge Street
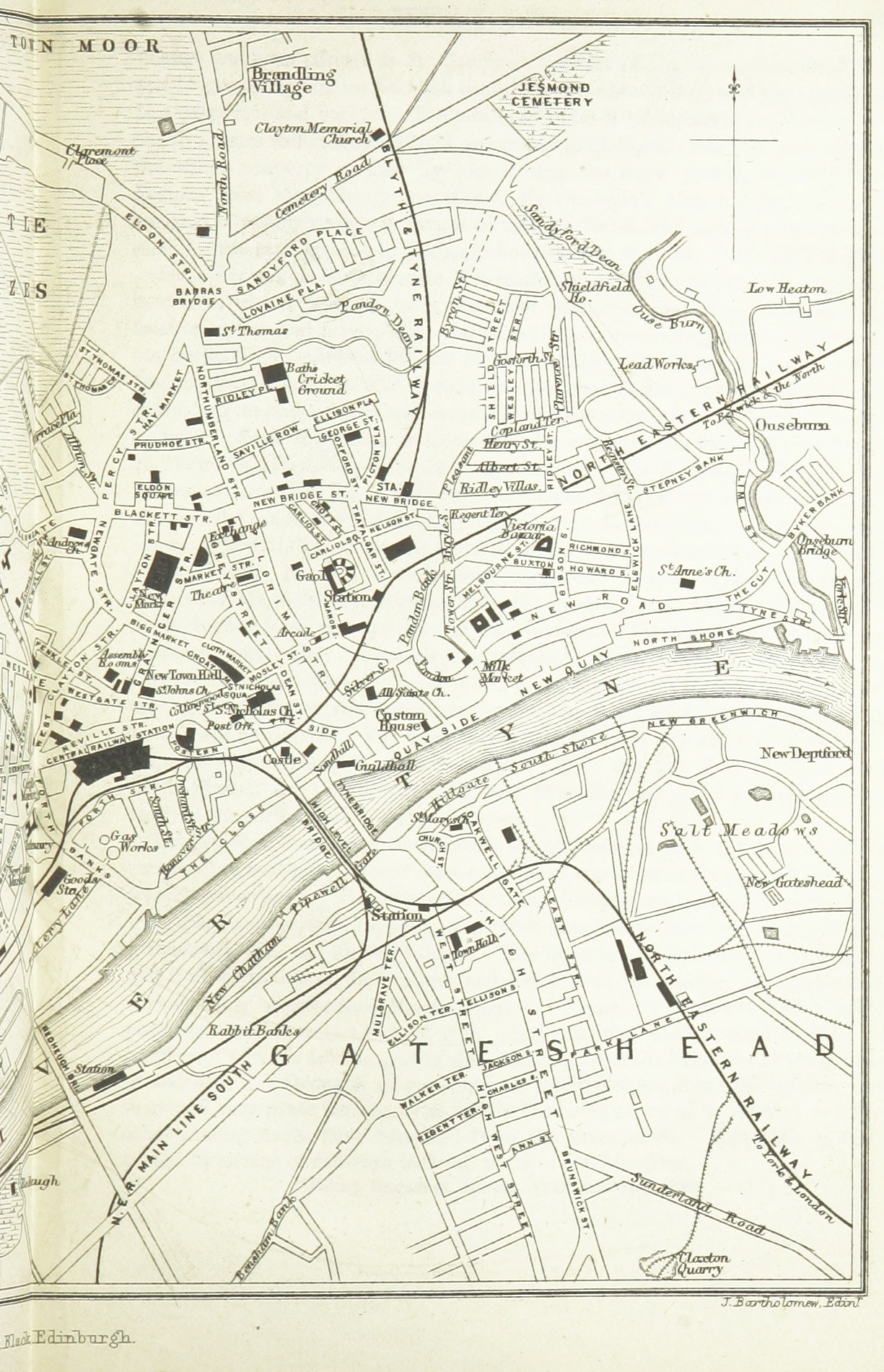
- Map from 1884, showing the location of the station (upper centre)

General information
- Location: New Bridge Street; Newcastle upon Tyne; England
- Coordinates: 54.9749°N 1.6065°W
- Platforms: 3

Other information
- Status: Demolished

History
- Original company: Blyth & Tyne Railway
- Pre-grouping: North Eastern Railway

Key dates
- 27 June 1864: Opened
- 1 January 1909: Closed to passengers
- 4 December 1967: Closed to goods
Location

Newcastle New Bridge Street was a railway station on the edge of the city centre of Newcastle-upon-Tyne, England. The station was the original Newcastle terminus of the Blyth and Tyne Railway, and was opened on 27 June 1864. In 1874 the Blyth & Tyne was taken over by the North Eastern Railway. For most of its life it served trains to Tynemouth and Morpeth. Picton House, a villa designed by John Dobson, was used for company offices and passenger facilities.

In 1904, the line to Tynemouth was electrified, and New Bridge Street temporarily became a terminus for the new electric service. The station was isolated, and had no connection to the lines towards Newcastle Central. In order to create the North Tyneside Loop, New Bridge Street was closed to passengers in 1909, and a new link was built to nearby Manors North station, allowing trains to run through to Newcastle Central. Following this, New Bridge Street became a goods station, and remained open as such until 1967. Picton House was demolished in 1970.

Nothing now remains of the station, as the A167(M) road and a Northumbria University car park have been built over the site.

Preceding station	Disused railways	Following station
Jesmond	North Eastern Railway; Blyth and Tyne Railway	Terminus
Jesmond	North Eastern Railway; North Tyneside Loop	Terminus
