= Manors Metro station =

Tyne and Wear Metro station in Newcastle upon Tyne

Manors
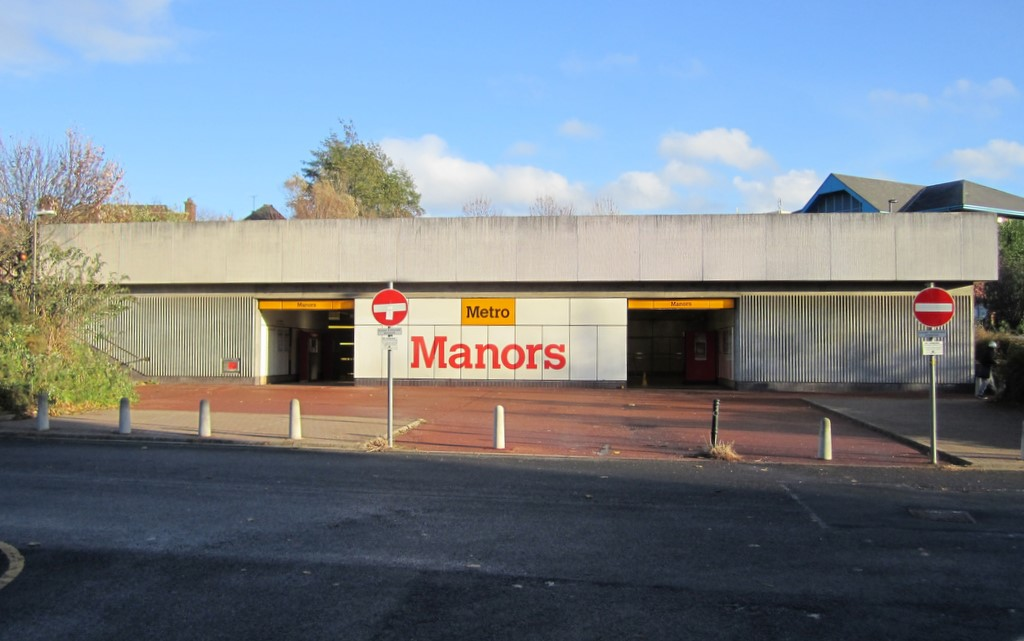

General information
- Location: Shieldfield, Newcastle upon Tyne; England
- Coordinates: 54°58′26″N 1°36′18″W
- Grid reference: NZ253644
- System: Tyne and Wear Metro station
- Transit authority: Tyne and Wear PTE
- Platforms: 2
- Tracks: 2

Construction
- Cycle facilities: 5 cycle pods
- Accessible: Step-free access to platform

Other information
- Station code: MAN
- Fare zone: A

History
- Original company: Tyne and Wear Metro

Key dates
- 14 November 1982: Opened

Passengers
- 2024/25: 0.388 million

Services
Preceding station	Tyne and Wear Metro	Following station
Byker towards South Shields via Whitley Bay	Yellow line	Monument towards St James
Location
- Location within Newcastle-upon-Tyne Location within Tyne and Wear

Manors is a Tyne and Wear Metro station, serving the Shieldfield area in Newcastle upon Tyne. It joined the network on 14 November 1982, following the opening of the fourth phase of the network, between Tynemouth and St James via Wallsend. The station is located near to Manors National Rail station, which is on the East Coast Main Line. However, the stations are not directly connected.

== History ==
The station was purpose-built for the network and opened on 14 November 1982.

Heading east from Manors, the route surfaces alongside the East Coast Main Line, before crossing the 815 m (2,674 ft) Byker Viaduct over the Ouseburn Valley, towards Byker. The S-shaped viaduct was constructed for the Tyne and Wear Metro by Ove Arup, with work commencing in 1976, and completed in 1979.

The former North Eastern Railway route between Manors and Jesmond is connected by a link tunnel, located to the west of the station. It is used only by trains running out of public service, allowing them to terminate at Manors, and then return to the depot at South Gosforth (and vice versa), without having to travel around the North Tyneside Loop.

== Facilities ==
Step-free access is available at all stations across the Tyne and Wear Metro network, with two lifts providing step-free access to platforms at Manors. As part of the Metro: All Change programme, new lifts were installed at Manors in 2014, with new escalators installed in 2015. The station is equipped with ticket machines, seating, next train information displays, timetable posters, and an emergency help point on both platforms. Ticket machines are able to accept payment with credit and debit card (including contactless payment), notes and coins. The station is fitted with automatic ticket barriers, which were installed at 13 stations across the network during the early 2010s, as well as smartcard validators, which feature at all stations.

There is no dedicated parking at the station, however there are nearby pay and display car parks, operated by Newcastle City Council. There is the provision for cycle parking, with five cycle pods available for use.

== Services ==
As of April 2021, the station is served by up to five trains per hour on weekdays and Saturday, and up to four trains per hour during the evening and on Sunday.

== Art ==
An abstract mural, Magic City by British artist Basil Beattie, was commissioned in 1987, and can be seen on the station concourse.
