= Manors railway station =

Railway station in Tyne and Wear, England

Manors
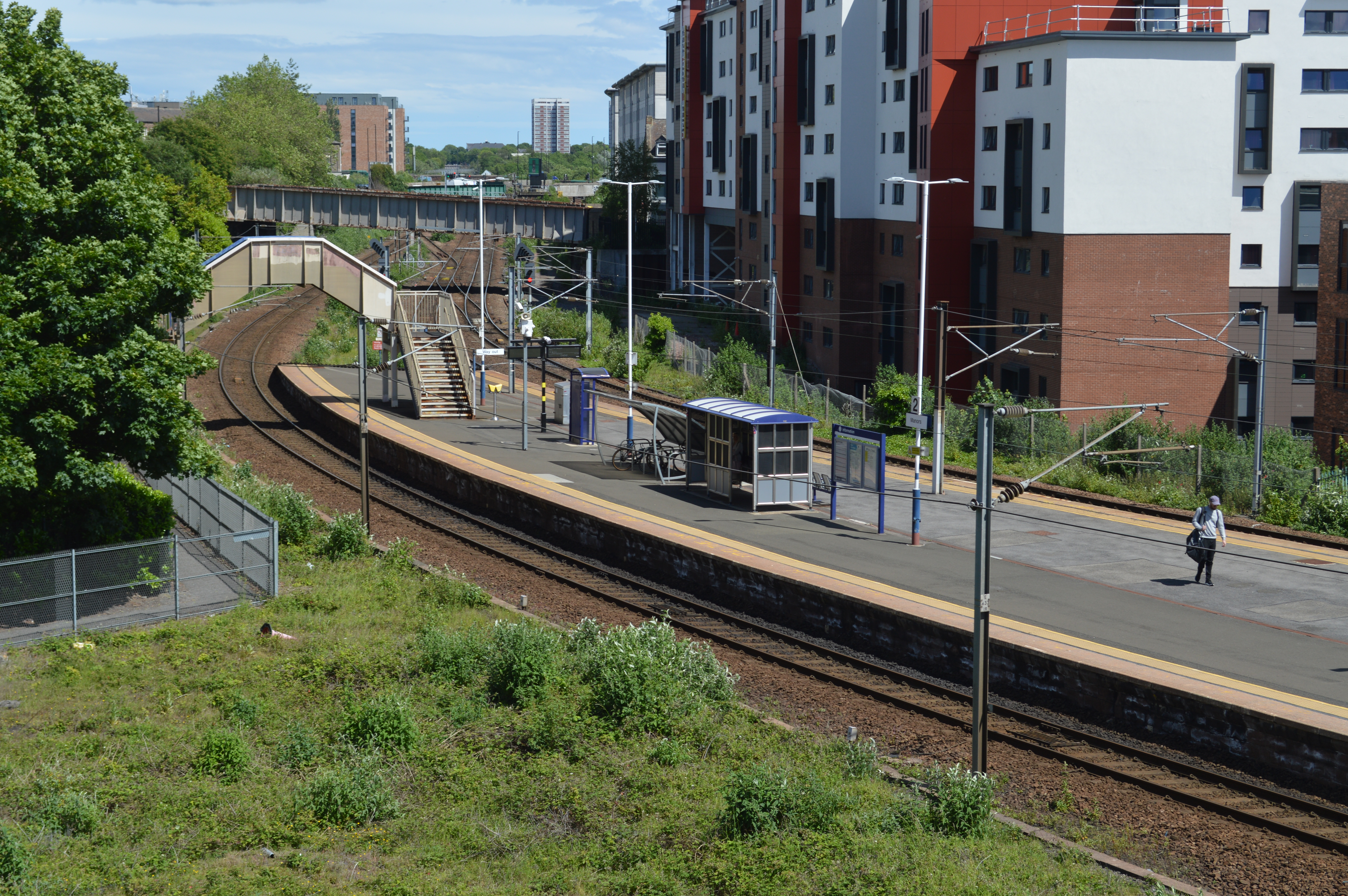

General information
- Location: Shieldfield, Newcastle upon Tyne; England
- Coordinates: 54°58′22″N 1°36′20″W
- Grid reference: NZ252642
- Owner: Network Rail
- Manager: Northern Trains
- Transit authority: Tyne and Wear PTE
- Platforms: 2
- Tracks: 3
- Connections: Manors

Other information
- Station code: MAS
- Classification: DfT category F2

History
- Original company: Newcastle and Berwick Railway
- Pre-grouping: North Eastern Railway
- Post-grouping: London and North Eastern Railway; British Rail (North Eastern Region)

Key dates
- 1 July 1847: Opened as Manors
- 1 January 1909: Renamed Manors East; adjacent station opened as Manors North
- 20 February 1969: Stations merged as Manors
- 23 January 1978: Former Manors North closed

Passengers
- 2021/22: ▲14,420
- 2022/23: ▲18,940
- 2023/24: ▲35,892
- 2024/25: ▲63,914
- 2025/26: ▲0.119 million
Location
- Location within Newcastle-upon-Tyne Location within Tyne and Wear
Notes
- Passenger statistics from the Office of Rail and Road

Manors is a railway station on the East Coast Main Line, which runs between London King's Cross and Edinburgh Waverley. The station serves the Quayside and Shieldfield areas of the city of Newcastle upon Tyne in Tyne and Wear, England. It is owned by Network Rail and managed by Northern Trains. The Metro station of the same name is not directly connected, and located a short walk away. It is 46 chains (0.93 km) from Newcastle, and is the station before Cramlington and Northumberland Park to the north.

== History ==
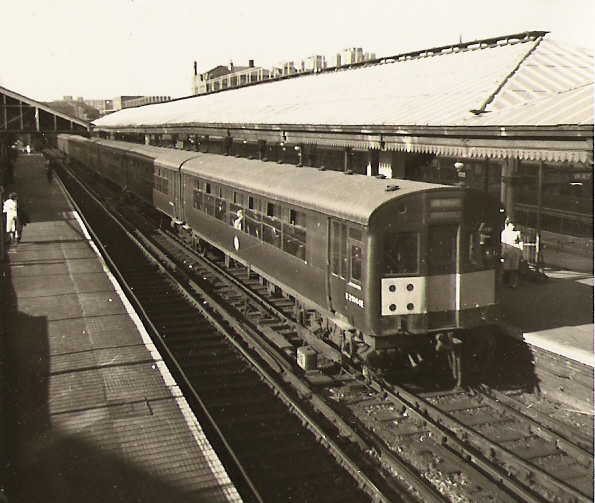
Electric train at Manors North in June 1967

Manors station opened on 30 August 1850 to replace a temporary station (Newcastle Carliol Square). When the East Coast Main Line was widened to four tracks in 1887, an additional two platforms were built. On 1 January 1909, the former Blyth and Tyne Railway terminus at New Bridge Street closed and the line was extended to join the East Coast Main Line between Manors and Newcastle Central. Manors North was opened on this line, with two through platforms and three bays, and the original Manors station was renamed Manors East at this time. The former station at New Bridge Street became a coal yard.

The two stations were combined on 20 February 1969.

In addition to the busy electric service to the coast, Manors was a terminus for trains to Morpeth, Blyth and Newbiggin. Although the Morpeth service had gone by BR days, the Blyth/Newbiggin passenger route survived until 1964.

=== Reconstruction ===
Most platforms at Manors closed on 23 January 1978 to allow for the construction of the Tyne and Wear Metro. The station now has two platforms, on the site of the previous platforms 7 and 8. Other parts of the former station remain, including the heavily overgrown platforms 1 and 2 and parts of platform 9. The new station opened on 14 November 1982.

=== Accidents and incidents ===
- On 3 March 1913, an empty stock train was in a rear-end collision with an electric multiple unit, due to a signalman's error. Forty-nine people were injured.
- On 7 August 1926, an electric multiple unit overran signals and was in collision with a freight train. The driver had tied the controller down and thus the train was able to continue when he leant out of the train and was killed, when he struck an overbridge.

== Facilities ==
The station is unstaffed, and the only facilities are a shelter with a telephone, a bike rack and a ticket machine (card only). The platforms are reached by a footbridge rather than by the original subway, so the station is not accessible for wheelchair or mobility-impaired users.

=== Refurbishment ===
In early 2015, the station received a new shelter, cycle racks, seats and a timetable information board, as requested by a small group of enthusiasts.

== Passenger volume ==
Manors was once the least used station in the county of Tyne & Wear. The station's usage has greatly increased with the re-opening of the former Blyth and Tyne line to Ashington.

Passenger Volume at Manors
	2002–03	2004–05	2005–06	2006–07	2007–08	2008–09	2009–10	2010–11	2011–12	2012–13	2013–14	2014–15	2015–16	2016–17	2017–18	2018–19	2019–20	2020–21	2021–22	2022–23
Entries and exits	1,409	1,882	1,390	1,002	1,406	2,574	2,998	2,976	4,120	3,872	4,444	6,474	7,614	9,404	9,068	12,980	17,346	3,858	14,420	18,940

The statistics cover twelve month periods that start in April.

== Services ==
All services are operated by Northern Trains.

On Mondays to Saturdays there is an hourly service between Newcastle and Morpeth, with two trains per day extending north from Morpeth to Chathill. There is also an hourly service between Newcastle and Ashington which started in December 2024 with the reopening of the Northumberland Line.

On Sundays, Manors has an hourly service between Newcastle and Morpeth; services to and from Ashington do not stop.

Preceding station	National Rail	Following station
Newcastle	Northern Trains; East Coast Main Line	Cramlington
Newcastle	Northern Trains; Northumberland Line	Northumberland Park
	Historical railways	
Newcastle	North Eastern Railway; Tyneside Electrics (North Tyneside)	Heaton
Newcastle	North Eastern Railway; York, Newcastle and Berwick Railway	Heaton
	Disused railways	
Newcastle	North Eastern Railway; Tyneside Electrics (North Tyneside)	Jesmond
Newcastle	North Eastern Railway; Tyneside Electrics (Riverside Branch)	Byker

== In popular culture ==
The station briefly featured in the 1971 film Get Carter, which showed the long staircase from the Trafalgar Street entrance of the station.

== Bibliography ==
- Quick, Michael (2023). Railway Passenger Stations in Great Britain: A Chronology (PDF) (5th ed.). London: Railway and Canal Historical Society.
