= Newcastle railway station =

Principal railway station in Tyne and Wear, England

Newcastle

General information
- Other names: Central Station
- Location: Neville Street, Grainger Town, Newcastle upon Tyne, England
- Coordinates: 54°58′06″N 1°37′01″W
- Grid reference: NZ246638
- Owner: Network Rail
- Manager: London North Eastern Railway
- Transit authority: Tyne and Wear Passenger Transport Executive (Nexus)
- Platforms: 12

Other information
- Station code: NCL
- Classification: DfT category A

History
- Original company: Newcastle and Carlisle Railway; York, Newcastle and Berwick Railway
- Pre-grouping: North Eastern Railway
- Post-grouping: London and North Eastern Railway; British Rail

Key dates
- 29 August 1850: Opened as Newcastle-on-Tyne Central
- 1890s: Extended

Passengers
- 2020/21: ▼1.555 million
- Interchange: ▼69,344
- 2021/22: ▲7.040 million
- Interchange: ▲0.269 million
- 2022/23: ▲8.403 million
- Interchange: ▲0.307 million
- 2023/24: ▲9.148 million
- Interchange: ▲0.349 million
- 2024/25: ▲10.548 million
- Interchange: ▲0.429 million

Listed Building – Grade I
- Feature: Passenger buildings and train shed with platforms
- Designated: 14 June 1954
- Reference no.: 1355291
Location
Notes
- Passenger statistics from the Office of Rail and Road

Newcastle (also known as Newcastle Central and locally as Central station) is a railway station in the city of Newcastle upon Tyne, in Tyne and Wear, England. It is a principal stop on the East Coast Main Line, around 268 miles (432 km) north of London King's Cross. It is the primary National Rail station serving the city and an interchange for local services provided by the Tyne and Wear Metro network, whose Central Station is situated directly underground. The station is the busiest in Tyne & Wear and in North East England; it is the seventh busiest in northern England.

Services on the East Coast Main Line (ECML) run from London to Edinburgh, via York and Berwick-upon-Tweed. There is a frequent service across the Pennines to Manchester and Liverpool. Cross-country services connect the city with the West Midlands and South West of England. The station is also on the Durham Coast Line, with connections to Gateshead, Sunderland, Hartlepool, Stockton and Middlesbrough; the Tyne Valley Line to Hexham and Carlisle; and the Northumberland Line to Ashington. Additional direct destinations from the station include Dundee, Glasgow, Durham, Darlington, Leeds, Sheffield, Derby, Birmingham, Reading, Bristol, Exeter and Plymouth.

The station opened in August 1850, as part of the then Newcastle & Carlisle and York, Newcastle & Berwick Railways. Now a Grade I listed building, it is located in the city's Grainger Town area, to the west of the Castle Keep. In Simon Jenkins' Britain's 100 Best Railway Stations, the station was one of only ten to be awarded five stars.

== History ==
=== Conception ===
A scheme for a central station was proposed by Richard Grainger and Thomas Sopwith in 1836, but was not built.

The Newcastle and Carlisle Railway had agreed to relinquish their insistence on exclusively using their Redheugh terminus on the south bank of the river Tyne. They agreed with George Hudson on a general station north of the Tyne, near the Spital. Instead of crossing the Tyne by a low level bridge and climbing to the Spital by a rope-worked incline, they would build an extension crossing at Scotswood and approaching on the north bank. They opened this line and a temporary station at Forth; passenger trains started using it on 1 March 1847.

Hudson, known as the "Railway King", was concentrating on connecting his portfolio of railways so as to join Edinburgh with the English network. His Newcastle and Berwick Railway obtained its authorising Act of Parliament in 1845 but, for the time being, it was to use the Newcastle and North Shields Railway's station at Carliol Square. Building a crossing of the Tyne was obviously going to be a lengthy process, so that he gave the construction of the general station a low priority. The Tyne crossing became the High Level Bridge.

In February 1846, the Newcastle and Carlisle Railway exerted pressure for the general station to be built, and the architect John Dobson was appointed by Hudson to design it, in association with the engineer T.E. Harrison, and Robert Stephenson; Gibson Kyle was clerk of works. By now, the general alignment of Hudson's railways was becoming clear: a main line from the south via Gateshead would approach over the High Level Bridge and enter the general station from the east; the Newcastle and Berwick line would be extended from Carliol Square and also enter from the east; through trains from London to Scotland would reverse in the new station. Newcastle and Carlisle Railway trains would, of course, enter from the west.

=== Design ===
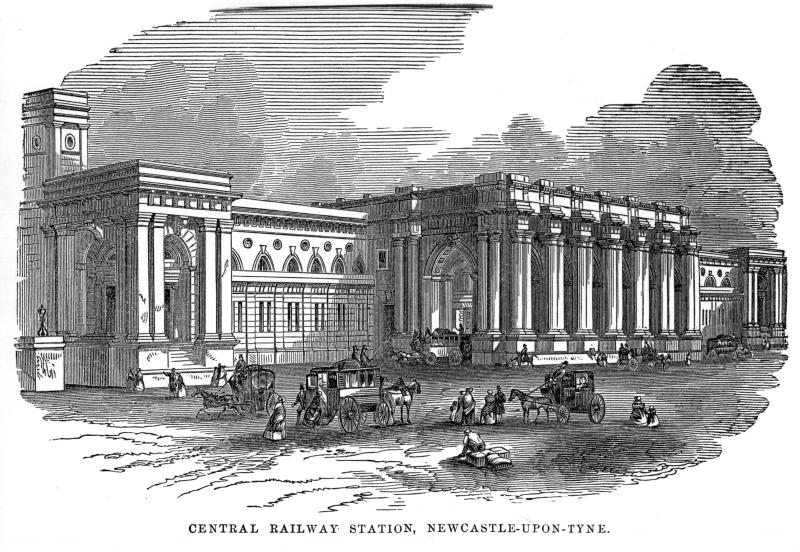
The exterior of the station in 1867

Dobson produced general plans for the station, now being referred to as Central Station, on a broad curve to front Neville Street so as to accommodate the alignment of the approaching railways at east and west. It was to a "Romano-Italian design with ornamental work of the Doric order". Two through platform lines were shown, with three west end bays and two at the east end. There were to be three train shed roofs with spans of 60 feet (18 m). Extensive offices and refreshment facilities were shown; there was to be a covered carriage drive on the Neville Street side extending from the porte-cochère at each end.

On 7 August 1847, a contract was let for the main part of the work to Mackay and Blackstock, for £92,000 (equivalent to £8,250,000 in 2025). A considerable amount of groundwork was necessary on the large site prior to the actual building work.

The work did not progress speedily and, in 1849, Hudson's collection of railway companies suffered a financial shock. At a time of more difficult trading and a tighter money market, Hudson's personal dealings were exposed as shady. The York, Newcastle and Berwick Railway (YN&BR) had been formed by merger of the previous smaller companies; it wished to reduce the financial commitment to the Central Station substantially and so hotel accommodation and the covered carriage drive were eliminated. One of the through platforms was also removed from the plan.

As built, the site covered 3 acres (1.2 ha) and the length of the platform faces was 830 yards (760 m).

=== Inauguration ===
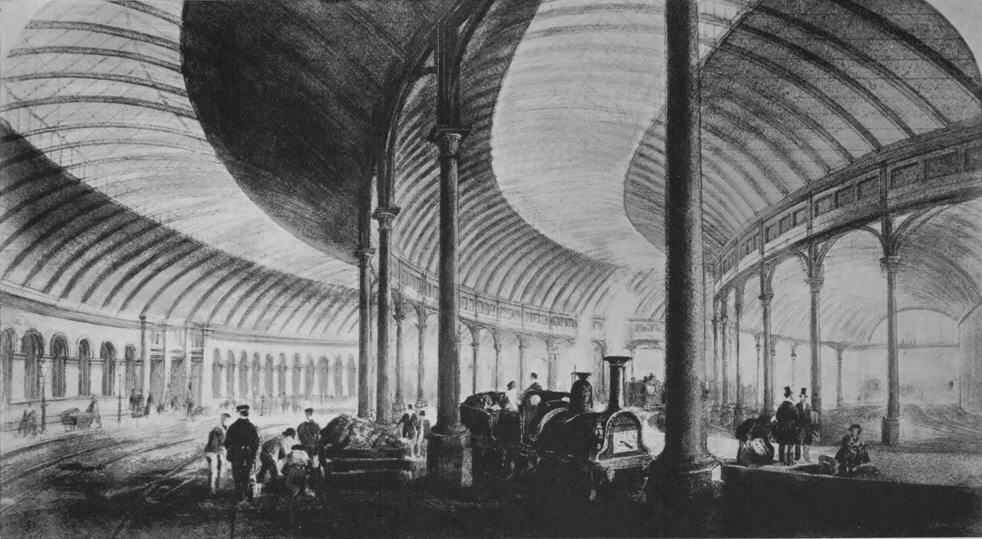
The train shed, soon after the station's opening

The train shed proved to be faster to construct and, on 29 August 1850, Queen Victoria visited the station by train and formally opened it. The day was declared a public holiday in Newcastle. The following day, YN&BR trains were diverted into the station. (Note: Since the opening of a temporary crossing of the Tyne, through trains had used Greenesfield station in Gateshead and had reversed at the east end of the Central Station site without making a station call.)

The train shed, along with Liverpool Lime Street's, was the first to be designed and built in Britain using curved wrought iron ribs to support an arched roof. The large section of the ribs was fabricated using curved web plates specially rolled using bevelled rolls; the novel technique was created by Thomas Charlton of Hawks Crawshay and was estimated to have saved 14% on the cost of the roof ironwork, compared with cutting rectilinear plates to the curve.

The station was lit by gas; a demonstration of electric arc-lighting was made, but was not at that date a practical possibility for the large station space. The platforms were positioned 15 inches (38 cm) above rail level.

The station was shared from the beginning by the Newcastle and North Shields Railway, which abandoned its earlier terminus at Carliol Square to the east which had operated since 1839. The Newcastle and Carlisle Railway started using Central station from 1 January 1851; it abandoned its earlier terminus at Forth.

In 1861, the York, Newcastle and Berwick Railway had already merged with others to form the North Eastern Railway; now it was desired to amalgamate with the Newcastle and Carlisle Railway too. The Corporation of Newcastle used the opportunity of the necessary Parliamentary Bill for the amalgamation to insist on construction of the abandoned porte-cochère; this was designed by Thomas Prosser and completed in 1863.

=== Expansion ===
In the 1860s, the passenger train service was increasing considerably, especially as branch lines opened, six platforms were increased to nine in 1871, to 12 in 1877 and then to 15 in 1894. An additional through island platform was provided in 1871, occupying space formerly used for stabling carriages. An increase in traffic and train lengths made it clear that a major extension of the station was essential.

Newcastle had been given city status in 1882 and the council was supportive of the work, seeing it as a civic improvement. Forth Street was displaced southwards and two new train shed roofs covered a southward extension of the station; in addition a large expansion to the east took place, with additional bay platforms there on the north side of the former bays. The original through track was blocked to form east and west bays, so that there were still only three through platform lines. This work was completed in 1894.

The new group of bay platforms at the east end had their own concourse quadrangle, known at the time as the Tynemouth Square; there was a separate booking hall for those local services. At this stage, the roof covered 7.5 acres (3.0 ha) in area; there were fifteen platforms with a length of around 3,000 yards (2,700 m).

=== Killingworth Billy ===
In 1901, an early steam locomotive was on display at the station:

"[The station] is further graced by a pedestal on which stands a curious old locomotive rejoicing in the name of "Billy". The true early history of "Billy" is well-nigh veiled in the mists of antiquity, and it was only by diligent enquiry that Mr Holliday, the Station Master, was able to learn a little of her antecedents. That "she" was constructed as far back as 1824 – 1826 is however certain, and on that score alone she is entitled to an introduction to such of the readers of the Railway Magazine as have until now been unaware of her existence. For about fifty-five years (until 1879) she performed good service, first at the Springwell, and latterly at the Killingworth colliery, from which place she actually steamed into Newcastle in 1881 to celebrate George Stephenson's centenary."

An image of the locomotive in Bywell's article is captioned "Puffing Billy" but it is not Puffing Billy of 1814, which is currently on display at the Science Museum, London. The locomotive in Bywell's article is known simply as Billy, built in 1826 and was presented to Newcastle upon Tyne Corporation for preservation in 1881. Initially, it was displayed on a plinth at the north end of the High Level Bridge, but was moved to the interior of Central station in 1896. It remained there until 1945, when it was moved to the city's Municipal Museum of Science and Industry; (Note: Now known as the Discovery Museum.) it was moved again in 1981 to the Stephenson Railway Museum in nearby North Shields, where it is still on display.

The early history of the locomotive is uncertain; it was probably a George Stephenson locomotive and was likely built at Killingworth Colliery workshops in around 1815–20.

=== 20th century ===
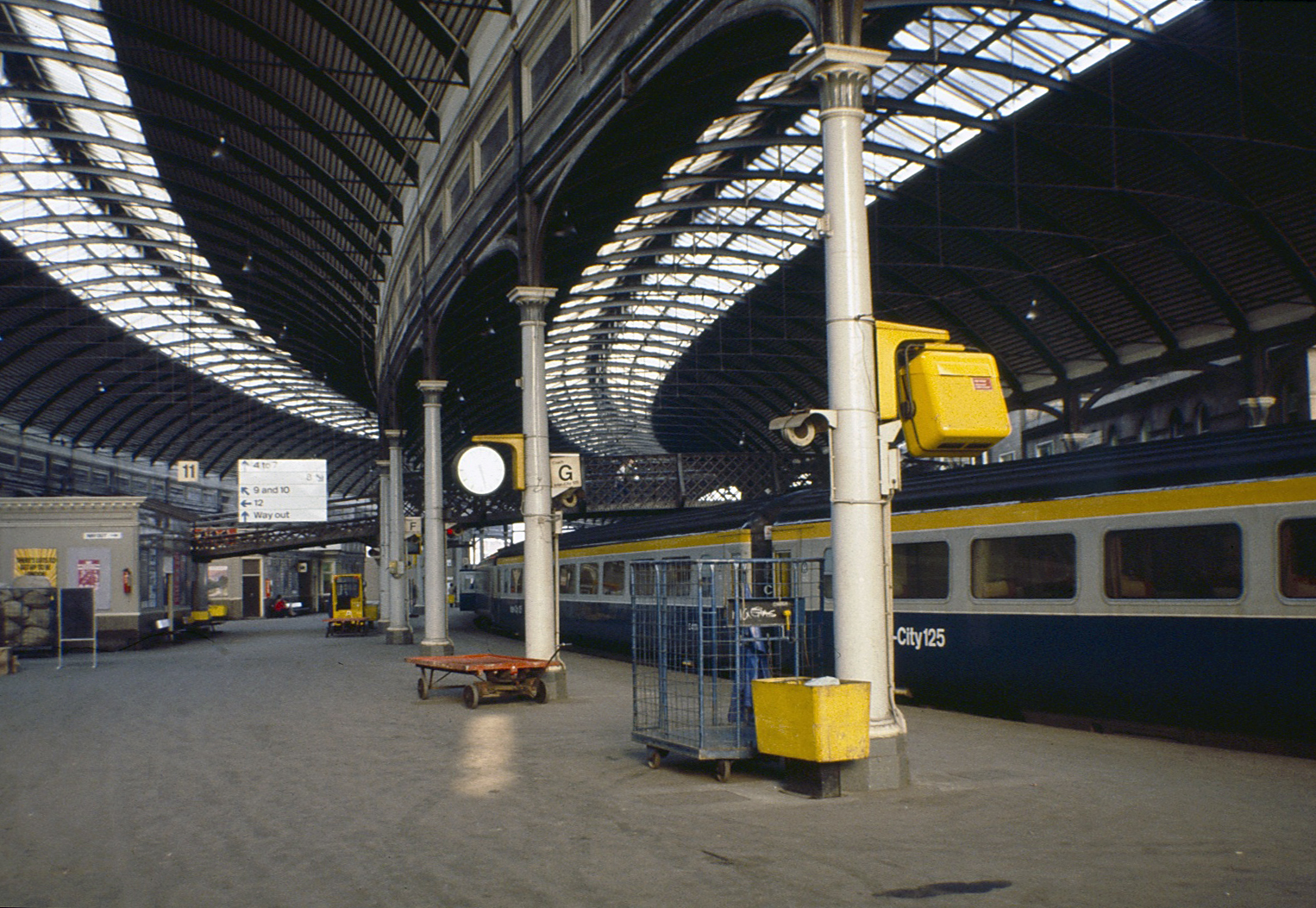
A British Rail InterCity 125 train in 1983

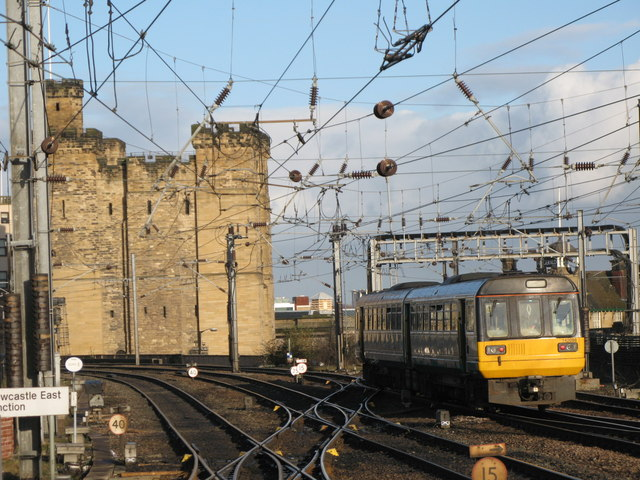
A Northern Rail Class 142 leaving the station; Castle Keep is in the background

In 1900, the North Eastern Railway started replacing the gas lighting in the station with electric arc equipment. Further use of electricity came from 1904, when several suburban lines were electrified using the third rail system to form the Tyneside Electrics system. Electric trains were introduced, using Central Station from 1 July 1904. The tracks on platforms 1 to 6 were equipped with electrified third rails; those on platform 7 were electrified later to handle electric trains to South Shields.

Another major development came on 1 October 1906 when the King Edward VII Bridge was opened, crossing the Tyne to the south-west of the station: Since 1850, ECML trains had entered Newcastle from the south via the High Level Bridge to the south-east, this meant however that they had to reverse in order to continue their journey, which lengthened journey times and led to congestion at the busy junction east of the station. The quadruple-tracked King Edward Bridge remedied this by allowing north–south trains to leave or enter from either side of the station. The triangular junction at the Gateshead side also allowed for greater flexibility, allowing trains from Sunderland to use the new bridge if necessary.

In 1909, Central station became Newcastle's only major city centre station, when the former Blyth and Tyne Railway's terminus at Newcastle New Bridge Street was closed; its trains diverted to Central Station, via a new connection to Manors.

=== Accidents and incidents ===
- On 17 August 1951, two electric multiple units experienced a head-on collision after one of them departed against a danger signal. Two people were killed.
- On 19 April 1955, a collision occurred between V2 locomotive no. 60968 and Fairburn tank no. 42073 on the diamond crossings. Both locomotives were derailed.
- On 3 July 1961, there was a significant fire inside the station building. The fire, having started in a cable duct at the peak of rush hour, saw the station's new signalling system put out of operation, delaying main line trains. Nearly 10,000 sq ft (930 m^{2}) of the station's roof was destroyed, but luckily no-one was hurt.
- On 30 November 1988, the front of a northbound High Speed Train collided with another travelling southbound, outside the station on the King Edward VII Bridge; 15 people were injured.

=== Metro station ===
The Tyne and Wear Metro system opened in 1980, taking over and improving many of the Tyneside suburban routes that had declined under British Railways management. The underground Central Station for Metro trains was constructed during the late 1970s underneath the main line station, and opened in 1981. Part of the porte-cochère was temporarily dismantled while excavation work took place. The Metro system was a considerable success; Many conventional rail services were transferred to it; several of the east end bays were closed, and converted to car parking and other usage. The Carlisle line was diverted in 1982 to enter Newcastle over the King Edward Bridge of 1906 and a large out-of-town shopping development, the Metro Centre, was opened, with a station on that line in 1987. The changing pattern of railway services meant that terminating trains were significantly fewer and through trains had increased. The emphasis on bay platforms at the station was no longer appropriate.

The opportunity was taken in conjunction with the ECML electrification scheme, inaugurated in 1991 by British Rail, to extend the station southwards to provide more through platforms. This encroached on to land occupied by through tracks previously used by goods trains, which had seen little use since the withdrawal of many goods services in the 1960s. A new island platform was provided, built around the southern wall of the station. The two platform faces are divided so as to provide four numbered platforms, 5 to 8, generally used for local trains.

== Layout and platforms ==
Platforms 2 and 3

Platforms 4 and 6

The station currently has 11 operational platforms:

- 1: A bay platform facing east, serving terminating Northern Trains services from the ECML. This platform is now used less frequently, as most services from Morpeth now continue west along the Tyne Valley line.
- 2: The main through platform for northbound CrossCountry and LNER services down the ECML
- 3–4: The main through platforms are used for southbound CrossCountry and LNER services which head south up the ECML; these platforms are also used less frequently by services heading north along the ECML and by services terminating here.
- 5–8: The four platforms all share the newer island platform, mainly used by Northern Trains services heading west along the Tyne Valley line and east along the Durham Coast Line.
- 9–11: Three bay platforms facing west: 9 and 10 are used by Northern Trains services heading west along the Tyne Valley line; 11 is used by southbound CrossCountry and TransPennine Express services.

The former platform 12 was mainly used by CrossCountry services terminating here. It was closed in May 2023 to allow track and signalling modifications, which enabled longer trains to occupy the adjacent platform 11.

== Station redevelopment ==
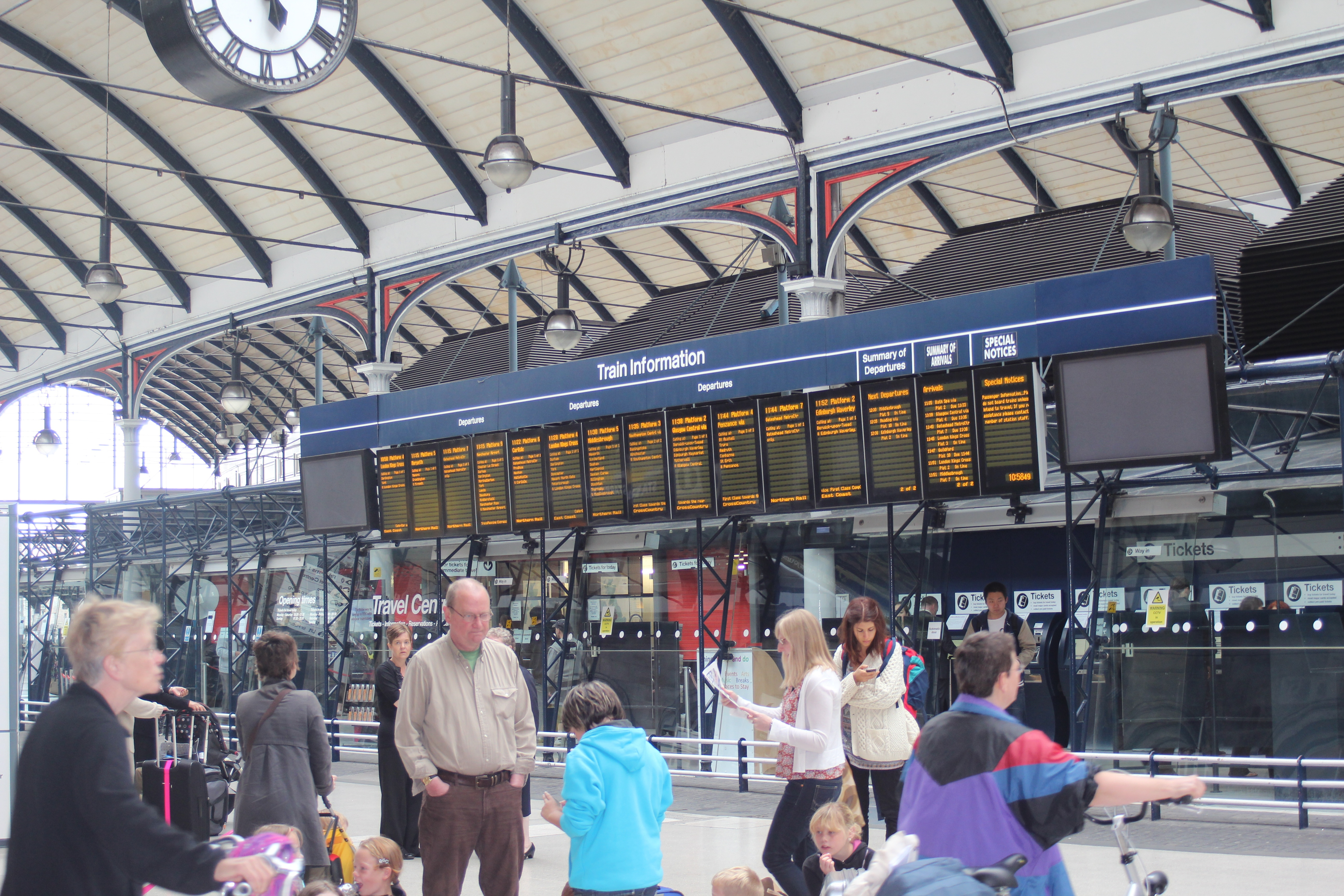
Departure board on the main station concourse, shown prior to the 2014 redevelopment

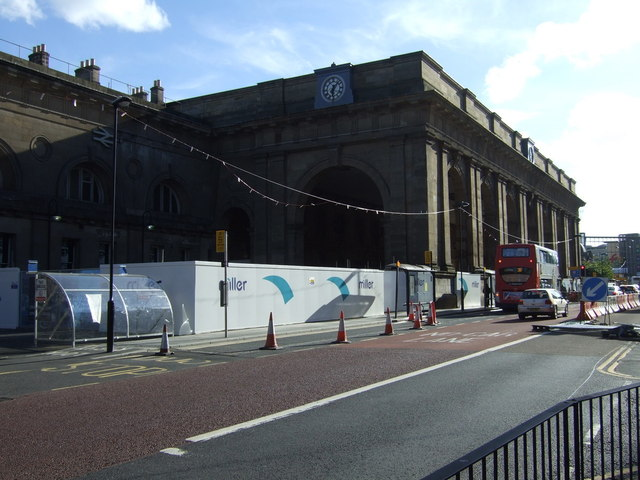
The redevelopment underway at the station's entrance

Plans were revealed on 30 April 2013 for a major redevelopment, including an £8.6 million project to regenerate the inside of the station and a further £11.4 million to develop the surrounding area. The portico redevelopment was completed in April 2014.

The redevelopment plans included:

- New retail space in the portico area, which was glazed to provide weather protection as well as retail units replacing the existing ticket office and travel centre. This double the previous retail space to make it equivalent to that of King's Cross
- The travel centre and ticket office were reduced in size and relocated to the area beyond the Sainsbury's Local store
- Improved toilet facilities
- Clearer signage
- Increased covered bicycle parking space
- A simpler layout that is claimed to accentuate the Grade I listed architecture, including the Castle Keep. The line of sight across the concourse was also improved
- Sand-blasting of the walls and new lighting were fitted
- Previous access points to the station were moved to make it easier to enter and leave the station
- Improved waiting rooms
- Alteration to the existing bridge structure
- New lifts and escalators
- New glazed canopies.

The footbridge in 2026

Changes to the area surrounding the station, included:

- New taxi rank to the east side of the former portico
- A two-way cycle track at the west end of Neville Street
- Change of traffic flow patterns to ease congestion
- Pedestrian crossings on Neville Street and Grainger Street
- Pedestrianisation of the car parking space outside the Centurion public house
- Wider footways and pavement cafes outside the station.

The work took place between May 2013 and April 2014 by Miller Construction. The station operated as normal throughout the works. The £8.6 million funding for the internal station work was provided by the Department for Transport's Station Commercial Project Facility Fund. The external works were jointly funded by NE1, Regional Growth Fund and Newcastle City Council.

Writing in his 2017 book Britain's 100 Best Stations, journalist and author Sir Simon Jenkins described the glazing of the portico and its conversion to retail usage as a “disaster” and ”thoughtless”, saying “What had been epic became anaemic.”

In 2021, a restoration of disused toilet facilities near platform 12 was completed; it was thought to date back to the 1890s.

== Infrastructure ==
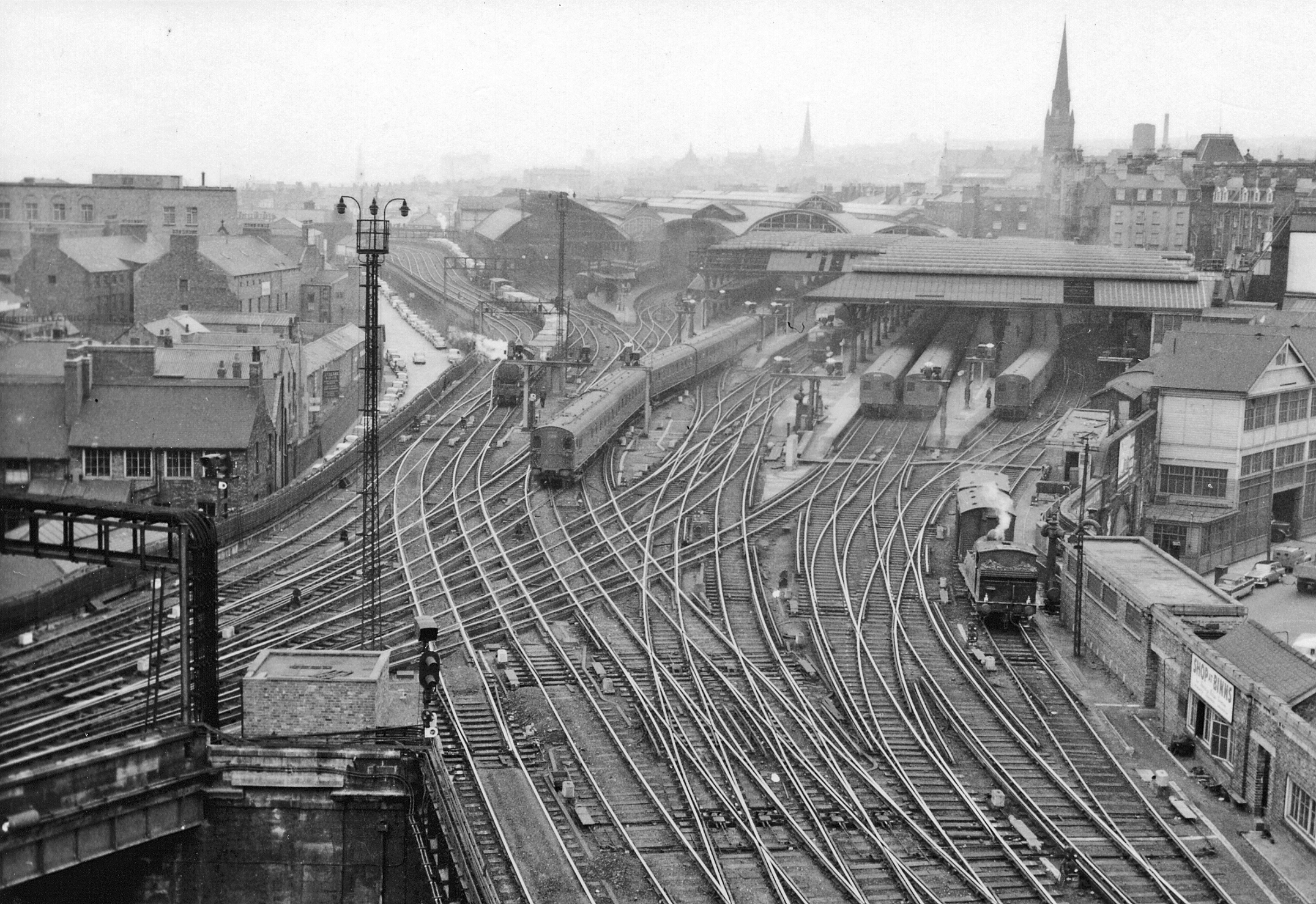
The eastern approach to the station in 1960, viewed from the castle

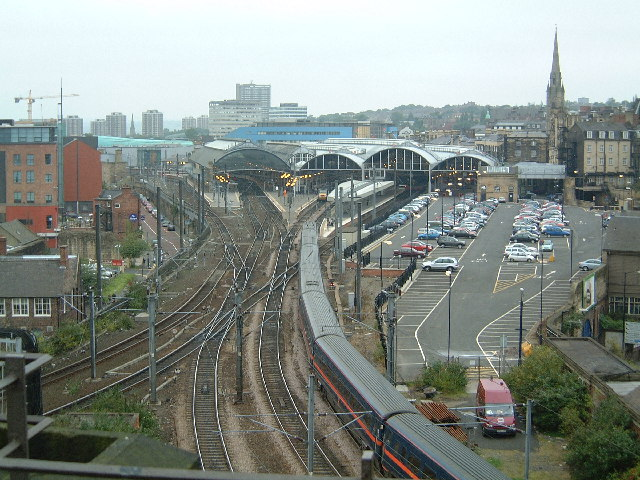
A similar view in 2005; the station was reduced in size after the Metro replaced suburban heavy rail services.

Trains cross the Tyne on one of two bridges:

- The older High Level Bridge south-east of the station, designed by Robert Stephenson opened on 27 September 1849. Its location meant north–south trains had to reverse in the station to continue their journey
- King Edward VII Bridge, south-west of the station, opened on 10 July 1906 allowing north–south trains to continue without reversing. The two bridges enable the trackwork north and south of the river to form a complete circle, allowing trains to be turned if necessary. The former Gateshead depot, next to the connecting tracks on the south side of the Tyne, mirrored Newcastle station.

The station was noted for its complex set of diamond crossings to the east of the station, which facilitated access to the High Level Bridge and the ECML northbound; it was said to be the "greatest such crossing in the world." The crossing was the subject of many early-1900s postcards, titled The Largest Railway Crossing in the World; these were photographed from the castle (towards the station) or from the station (towards the castle).

The crossing has been simplified in recent years, as the opening of the Metro brought about the withdrawal of many heavy rail suburban services and the closure of the bay platforms they operated from, on the north side of the station, removing the need for such a complex crossing. Much of this work was carried out in 1988–9 as part of remodelling and resignalling work associated with ECML electrification. A new island platform on the former goods lines was commissioned as part of this work, with signalling control relocated to the Tyneside IECC, on the opposite side of the river.

Heaton depot lies to the north of the station, on the ECML.

== Services ==
View of the platforms with a CrossCountry train in the foreground

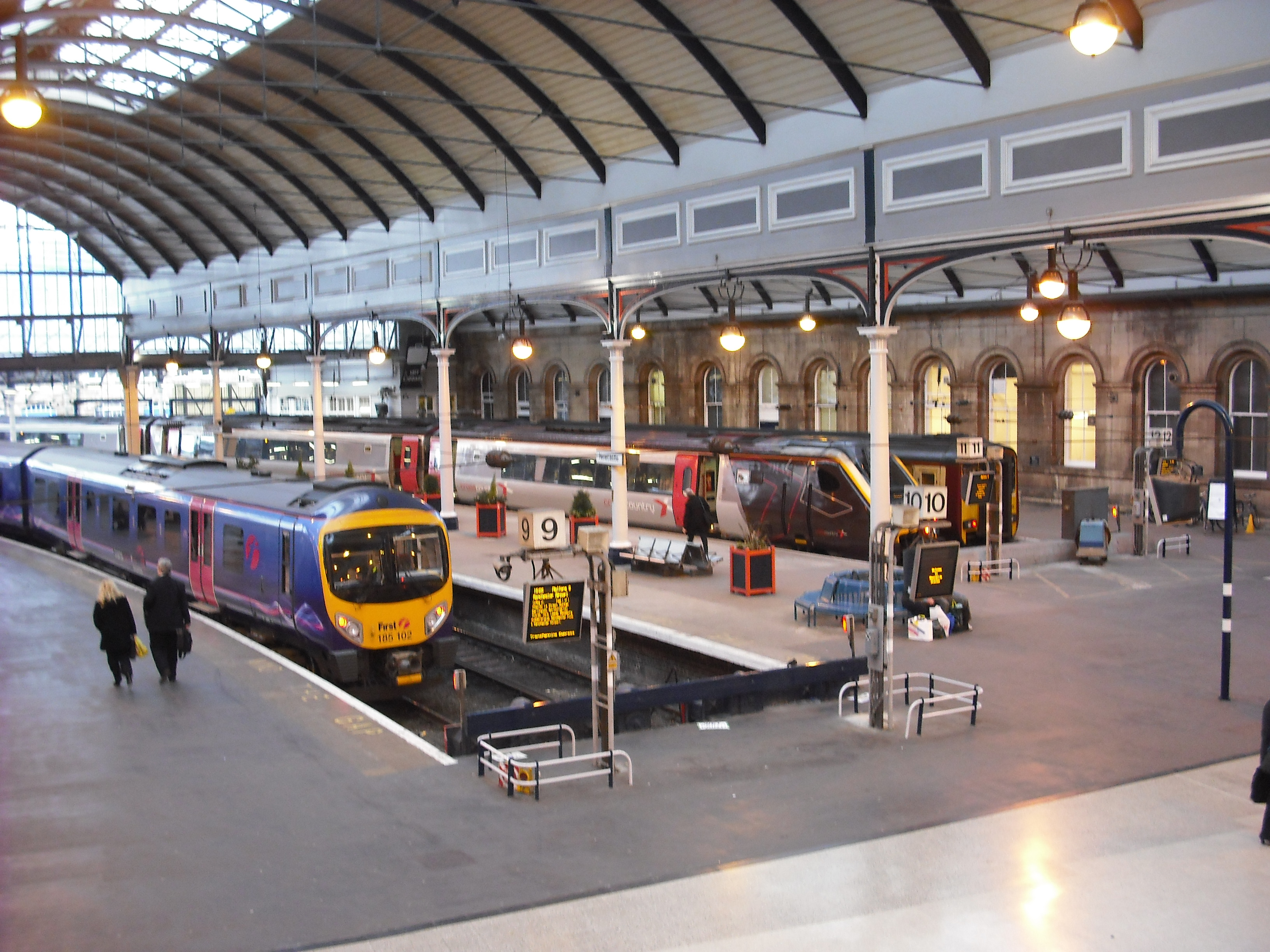
First TransPennine Express, CrossCountry and First ScotRail trains in 2009

The station is served by five train operating companies, which provide the following general off-peak service pattern in trains per hour/day (tph/tpd):

London North Eastern Railway:

- 2 tph to Edinburgh Waverley; of which:
  - 4 tpd are extended to Aberdeen
  - 1 tpd is extended to Inverness
- 3 tph to London King's Cross (one fast, two semi-fast); of which:
  - 1 tpd is the early morning Flying Scotsman service.

CrossCountry:

- 1 tph to Edinburgh Waverley
  - 2 tpd continues to Glasgow Central
- 1 tph to Plymouth, via Leeds, Birmingham New Street and Bristol Temple Meads; of which:
  - 1 tpd continues to Penzance
- 6 tpd to Reading, via Doncaster, Birmingham New Street and Oxford.

Lumo:

- 5 tpd to Edinburgh Waverley; of which:
  - 2 tpd continue to Glasgow Queen Street
- 6 tpd to London Kings Cross.

Northern Trains:

- 2 tph to Ashington, on the Northumberland Line.
- 1 tph to Morpeth, via Cramlington
- 2 tph to Middlesbrough, via Sunderland and Hartlepool, along the Durham Coast Line
- 2 tph to Carlisle, via Hexham, on the Tyne Valley Line
- 1 tph to Hexham, on the Tyne Valley Line.

TransPennine Express:

- 1 tp2h to Edinburgh Waverley
- 1 tph to Liverpool Lime Street, via York, Leeds, Huddersfield and Manchester Victoria.

Preceding station	National Rail	Following station
Durham	CrossCountry Cross Country Route	Morpeth
Durham	CrossCountry Cross Country Route	Terminus
Durham, Darlington or York	London North Eastern Railway; East Coast Main Line	Terminus
Durham, Darlington or York	London North Eastern Railway; East Coast Main Line	Alnmouth, Morpeth, Berwick-upon-Tweed or Edinburgh Waverley
Edinburgh Waverley	London North Eastern Railway; East Coast Main Line; Flying Scotsman (One-way operation, limited service)	York
Stevenage	Lumo; London to Edinburgh	Morpeth
London King's Cross	Lumo; London to Edinburgh	Morpeth
Heworth	Northern Trains; Durham Coast Line	MetroCentre
Sunderland	Northern Trains; Durham Coast Line	MetroCentre
Chester-le-Street	Northern Trains; East Coast Main Line (Limited service)	Terminus
Terminus (Monday-Saturday)	Northern Trains; Northumberland Line	Manors (Monday-Saturday)
MetroCentre (Sundays only)	Northern Trains; Northumberland Line	Northumberland Park
Terminus	Northern Trains; Tyne Valley Line (Newcastle-Hexham)	Dunston
Sunderland	Northern Trains Tyne Valley Line (Middlesbrough-Carlisle)	MetroCentre
Durham	TransPennine Express; North TransPennine	Morpeth

== Tyne & Wear Metro ==
The Metro's Central Station lies beneath the main line facility; it is one of five underground stations serving the city centre. It is an interchange between the Yellow and Green lines, and is the last stop prior to crossing the Tyne towards Gateshead.

Preceding station	Tyne and Wear Metro	Following station
Gateshead towards South Shields	Yellow line	Monument towards St James via Whitley Bay
Gateshead towards South Hylton	Green line	Monument towards Airport

== See also ==
- North Tyneside Loop
