= Shieldfield =

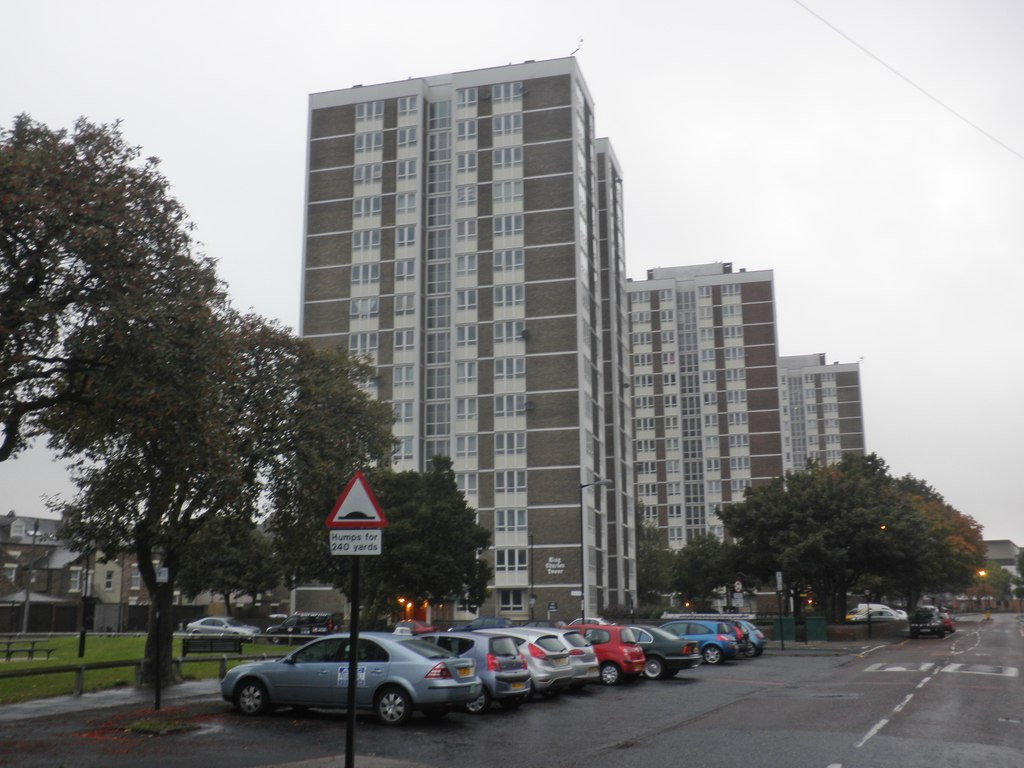
- King Charles Tower, Shieldfield

- Location in Tyne and Wear
- Coordinates: 54.981°N 1.599°W
- OS grid reference: NZ257651
- Sovereign state: United Kingdom
- Country: England
- District: Tyne and Wear

Shieldfield is an area in the east of Newcastle upon Tyne, England. It borders Sandyford to the North, the City Centre to the West, Heaton and Byker to the East, and Battlefield to the South. It is one of the communities contained within the Ouseburn Electoral Ward of Newcastle City Council.

== History ==
The name of the district is considered to be a reference to a shelter in the forest clearing, derived from Anglo-Saxon sources.

During the English Civil War, King Charles I was permitted to play golf at Shieldfield whilst he was held prisoner at Newcastle by Parliamentarian forces. The building where he would rest, King Charles House, was demolished in 1960 to make way for the new council estate. This is commemorated by a plaque within Shieldfield Green, and reflected in the naming of King Charles Tower adjacent to the site.

The area was increasingly urbanised during the 19th century, and by 1881, contained many houses for the employees of nearby factories. The population at this time was 12,826, living in 2,253 units of accommodation (mostly flats). There were also 16 pubs and 19 'beer shops' which permitted patrons to drink on the premises. By the 1930s, there were more than 90 shops in the area.

The district largely consists of a council estate, with a few streets of Victorian terraced houses. The former Methodist Church for Shieldfield remains consecrated but is a gallery called Shieldfield Art Works.

Over the last decade, developments have seen a number of Halls of Residence constructed to accommodate students from the nearby Northumbria University, and in 2007 Northumbria University opened its new state of the art 'City Campus East' on the site of the former Warner Brothers cinema. An inscribed granite tablet on nearby Falconar Street marks the birthplace of William Armstrong, 1st Baron Armstrong.

== Transport ==
Bus services are provided by Tyne and Wear Passenger Transport Executive under the brand name Nexus, and also by Stagecoach North East. Northern provides train service from the nearby Manors railway station. The A167(M) Central Motorway has a junction with the A193 near Shieldfield.
