= Jesmond railway station =

Former railway station in Newcastle upon Tyne

Jesmond
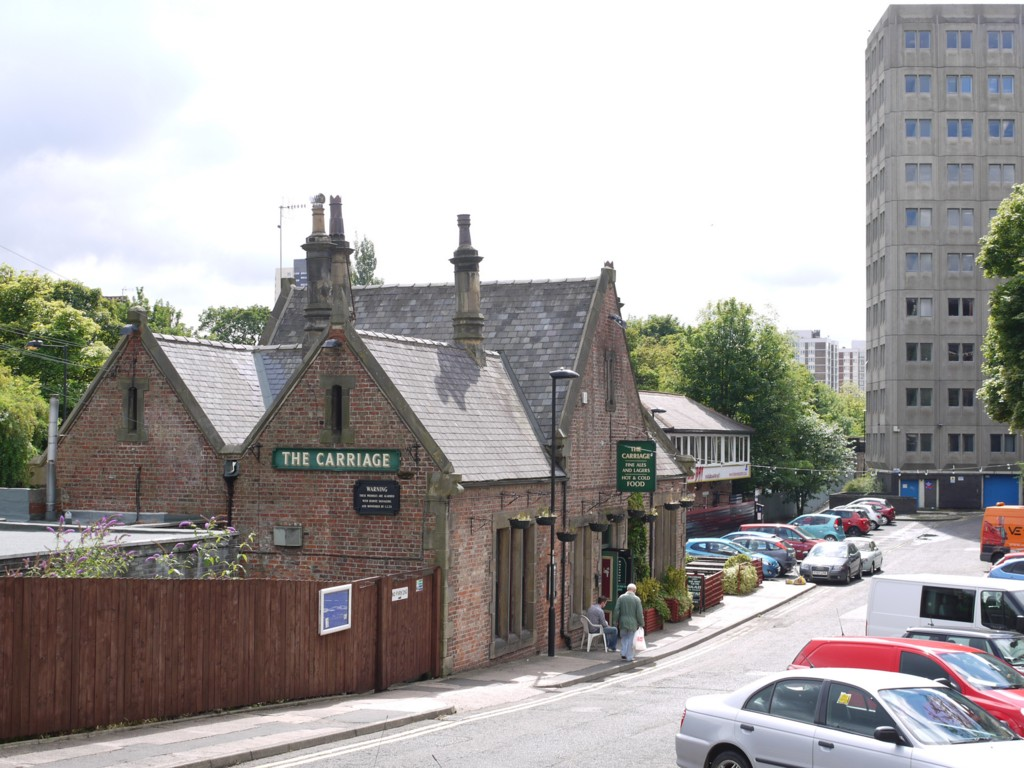
- The former Jesmond railway station, now The Carriage public house

General information
- Location: Jesmond Road, Jesmond, NE2; Newcastle upon Tyne; England
- Coordinates: 54.9819°N 1.6048°W
- OS Grid ref: NZ 254 653

Other information
- Status: No longer used as a station; converted to a pub

History
- Opened: 27 June 1864
- Closed: 23 January 1979
- Original company: Blyth and Tyne Railway
- Pre-grouping: North Eastern Railway
- Post-grouping: London and North Eastern Railway; British Rail (North Eastern Region); British Rail (Eastern Region)

National Heritage List for England
- Official name: The Carriage Public House
- Type: Grade II listed building
- Designated: 5 December 1978
- Reference no.: 1355276
Location
- Location within Newcastle-upon-Tyne Location within Tyne and Wear

Jesmond railway station is a former railway station, serving the suburb of Jesmond, Newcastle upon Tyne in Tyne and Wear, England. It was opened on 27 June 1864 as part of the Blyth and Tyne Railway's line to Newcastle New Bridge Street, and closed on 23 January 1978 when the line was closed for conversion into part of the Tyne and Wear Metro. With the opening of the Metro, it was replaced by the Jesmond Metro, situated underground some 120 m (130 yd) to the north-west.

The old station buildings still exist, and the main building is a grade II listed building. It is now a pub, known as The Carriage.

== History ==
In the 1860s the Blyth and Tyne Railway, which until then had linked Blyth with Percy Main and Tynemouth, built an extension to a terminus at Newcastle New Bridge Street that included Jesmond as its penultimate station. The station opened, along with the line, on 27 June 1864.

The station was built between 1861 and 1864, possibly to a design by John Dobson. The station had two side platforms, with the principal station building on the western of the two, and a simple waiting shelter on the other. The three-bay principal building was built of brick, with stone quoins and a Welsh slate roof. A station master's house was provided to the south of the station building.

The station closed on 23 January 1978 to allow for the construction of the Tyne and Wear Metro network. This used the former Blyth and Tyne routeing to the north, but diverged into a new tunnel alignment just to the north, thus bypassing the original station. The new Jesmond Metro station was built some 120 m (130 yd) to the north west of the former station, opening in August 1980.

== Remains ==
The main station building still exists, and is now The Carriage public house. The building is grade II listed and is the last remaining station built by the Blyth and Tyne Railway. A mockup of a signal box was built in the early 1990s, on the site of the former station master's house (demolished in the late 1970s), forming part of a restaurant, along with an old railway carriage.

Tracks still run through the former station, linking the Tyne and Wear Metro line to the north of Jesmond with the line to the west of Manors. However, this link is only used by empty Metro trains going to and from their depot at South Gosforth, and no trains stop at the old station.
