= North Tyneside Loop =

The North Tyneside Loop refers to the railway lines in North Tyneside from Newcastle upon Tyne via Wallsend, North Shields, Whitley Bay, Backworth, Benton and South Gosforth back to Newcastle. Since the 1980s, it has formed part of the Tyne and Wear Metro, albeit in modified form.

== History ==
The loop emerged from two competing railways which were built from Newcastle to Tynemouth, and was not completed until 1909: the southern leg of what became the loop was built by the Newcastle and North Shields Railway in 1839 from Newcastle Central via Wallsend; although initially terminating at North Shields, it was extended to Tynemouth in 1847. The northern leg was built by the Blyth and Tyne Railway in 1861 from Newcastle New Bridge Street to Tynemouth via Benton, although the original Blyth & Tyne route ran on a more inland course to Tynemouth from Monkseaton.

Initially both railways had separate terminus stations at Tynemouth, but both lines had been taken over by the North Eastern Railway (NER) by the 1870s. In 1882, the NER built a new coastal route from Monkseaton to Tynemouth via Whitley Bay, abandoning the original Blyth and Tyne inland route, and this allowed both legs of the route to join head on at Tynemouth, where a new through station was opened. However the loop was still not completed, as the northern and southern legs of the route still ran into separate unconnected termini at Newcastle.

=== Electrification ===
The line was electrified (as the Tyneside Electrics) by the NER in 1904 to fight competition from the newly built electric tramways. In 1909 the loop was finally completed when the original Blyth & Tyne terminus at New Bridge Street was closed and a line built to connect the northern leg of the route to an extended Manors station. However the route was de-electrified in 1967, and converted to diesel multiple unit operation.

=== Tyne and Wear Metro ===
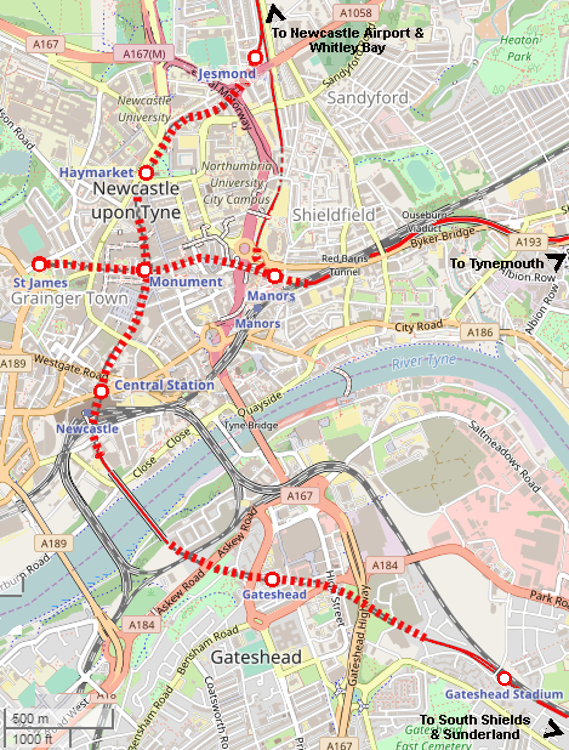
As part of the Tyne and Wear Metro, the southern leg of the loop was diverted underground to a new terminus at St James, intersecting with the northern leg at Monument Metro station.

In the late 1970s the loop was converted to form part of the Tyne and Wear Metro, which opened in stages beginning in 1980. Both the northern and southern legs of the loop were diverted onto new underground routes on the approach to Newcastle, so that both legs of the loop now intersect at the underground Monument Metro station.

In order for the Metro to have its own independent route into Newcastle, the southern leg of the line via Wallsend was diverted just east of Heaton Junction onto a new route which runs parallel to the East Coast Main Line, serving two new stations at Chillingham Road and Byker, then traversing the Byker Viaduct, before running underground via Manors and Monument to a new terminus at St James, and no longer serves Central Station; the northern leg does so indirectly via the underground Central Metro station.

== See also ==
- Riverside Branch
