= Byker Metro station =

Tyne and Wear Metro station in Newcastle upon Tyne

Byker
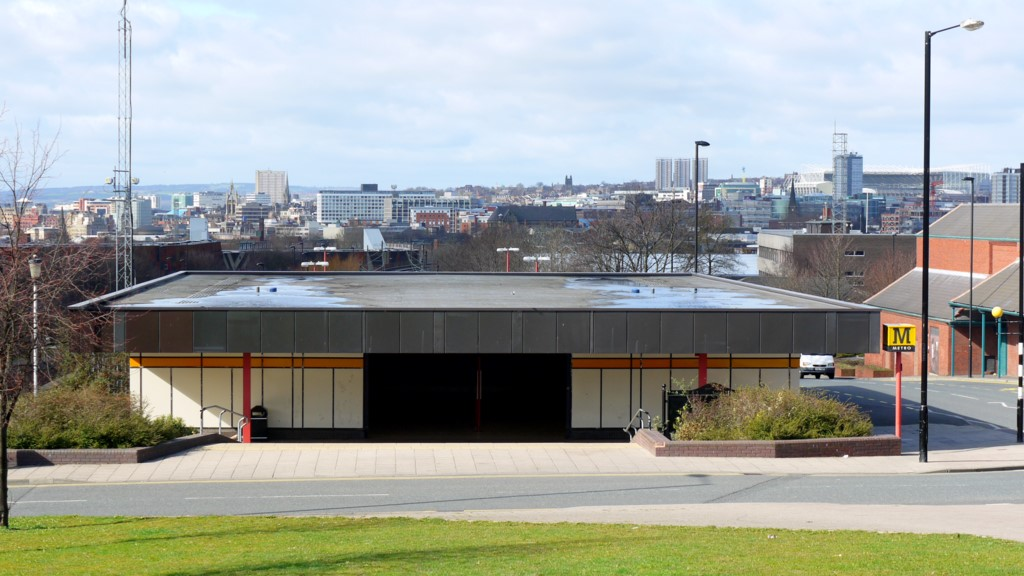

General information
- Location: Byker, Newcastle upon Tyne; England
- Coordinates: 54°58′34″N 1°34′49″W
- Grid reference: NZ279637
- System: Tyne and Wear Metro station
- Transit authority: Tyne and Wear PTE
- Platforms: 2
- Tracks: 2

Construction
- Cycle facilities: 3 Sheffield stands
- Accessible: Step-free access to platform

Other information
- Station code: BYK
- Fare zone: A

History
- Original company: Tyne and Wear Metro

Key dates
- 14 November 1982: Opened

Passengers
- 2024/25: 0.605 million

Services
Preceding station	Tyne and Wear Metro	Following station
Chillingham Road towards South Shields via Whitley Bay	Yellow line	Manors towards St James
Location
- Location within Newcastle-upon-Tyne Location within Tyne and Wear

Byker is a Tyne and Wear Metro station, serving the suburb of Byker, Newcastle upon Tyne in Tyne and Wear, England. It joined the network on 14 November 1982, following the opening of the fourth phase of the network, between Tynemouth and St James via Wallsend.

== History ==
Prior to the construction of the Tyne & Wear Metro, there was a British Rail station at Byker, which was located to the north of Shields Road. The station closed to passengers in 1954, with the remainder of the Riverside Branch closing to passengers in July 1973.

Heading west from the station, the route crosses the 815 m (2,674 ft) Byker Viaduct over the Ouseburn Valley, then running alongside the East Coast Main Line, before heading underground, to Manors. The S-shaped viaduct was constructed by Ove Arup, with work on the structure commencing in 1976, with completion in 1979.

In 2021, a montage was added with works from the Baltic Centre for Contemporary Art.

== Facilities ==
Step-free access is available at all stations across the Tyne and Wear Metro network, with ramps providing step-free access to platforms at Byker. The station is equipped with ticket machines, a sheltered waiting area, seating, next train information displays, timetable posters, and an emergency help point on both platforms. Ticket machines are able to accept payment with credit and debit card (including contactless payment), notes and coins. The station is fitted with automatic ticket barriers, which were installed at 13 stations across the network during the early 2010s, as well as smartcard validators, which feature at all stations.

There is no dedicated car parking available at the station. There is the provision for cycle parking, with three cycle racks available for use.

== Services ==
As of April 2021, the station is served by up to five trains per hour on weekdays and Saturday, and up to four trains per hour during the evening and on Sunday.
