= British Rail Class 555 =

Electric multiple units in use on the Tyne and Wear Metro

British Rail Class 555; Metro
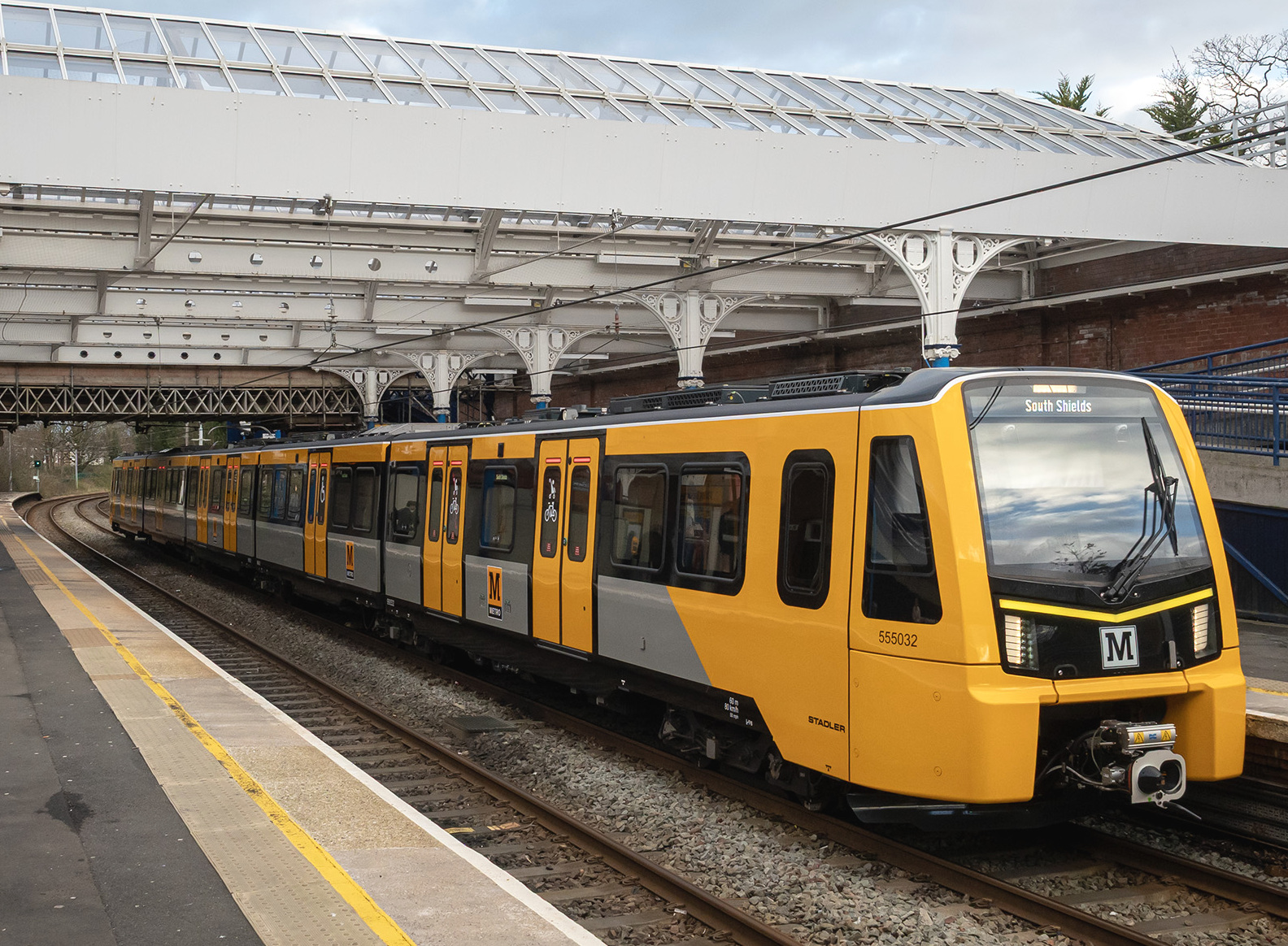
- Class 555 at Whitley Bay in 2026

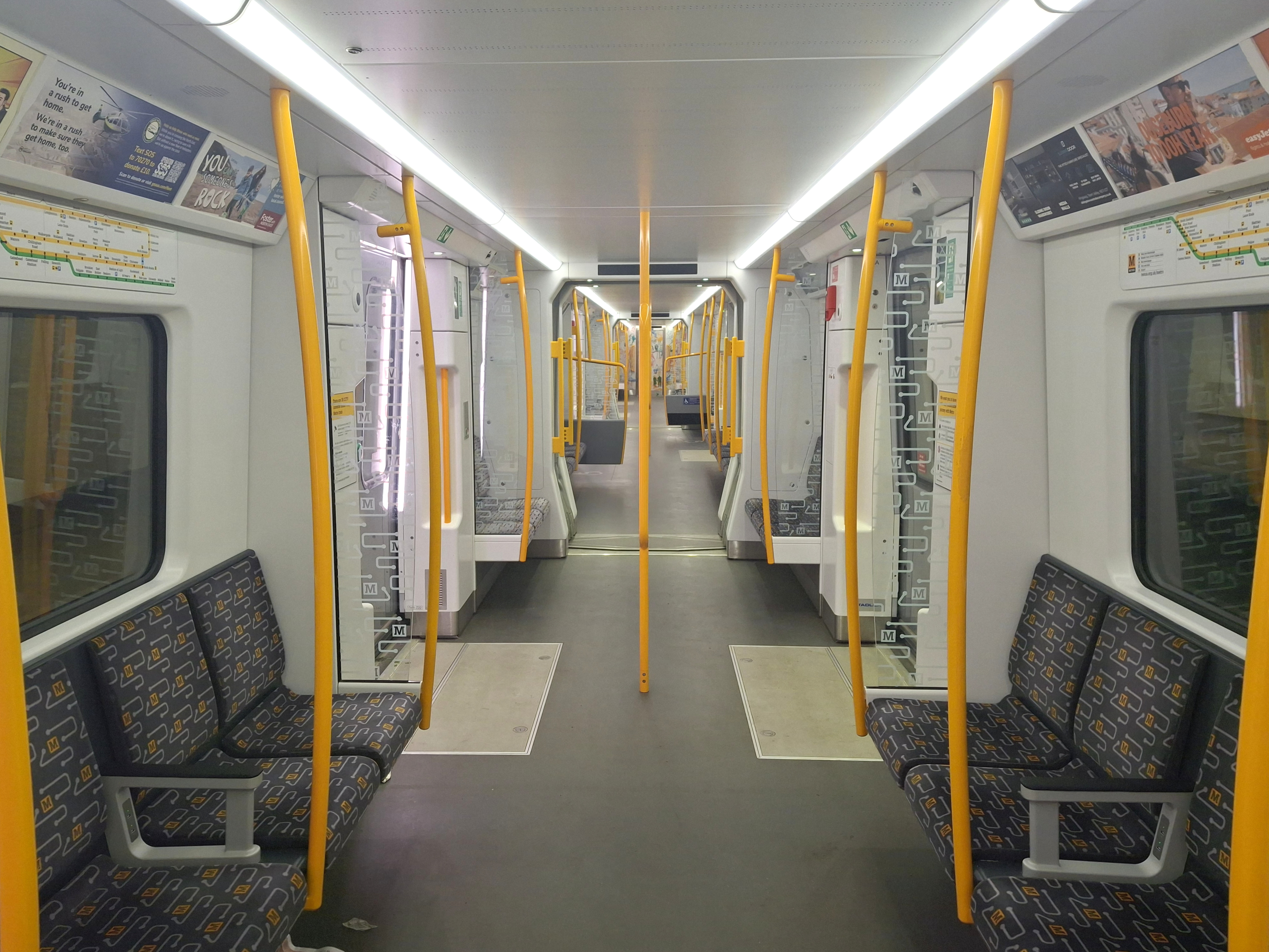
- Class 555 interior
- In service: 18 December 2024 – present
- Manufacturer: Stadler Rail
- Assembly: Stadler Rheintal AG
- Built at: St. Margrethen, Switzerland
- Family name: METRO
- Replaced: Tyne and Wear Metrocar
- Constructed: 2021–2025
- Number built: 46
- Number in service: 46
- Formation: 5 cars per unit
- Fleet numbers: 555001–555046
- Capacity: 600 (104 seated, 496 standing)
- Operator: Tyne & Wear Metro
- Depots: South Gosforth; Howdon
- Lines served: Green (Airport – South Hylton); Yellow (St James – South Shields)

Specifications
- Car body construction: Aluminium
- Train length: 59.900 m (196 ft 6.3 in)
- Width: 2,650 mm (8 ft 8 in)
- Height: 3,445 mm (11 ft 3.6 in)
- Floor height: 940 mm (3 ft 1 in)
- Doors: Double-leaf sliding plug, each 1,400 mm (4 ft 7 in) wide (8 per side)
- Wheel diameter: 720 to 645 mm (28.35 to 25.39 in) (new–worn)
- Wheelbase: Motor bogies: 2,200 mm (7 ft 3 in); Trailing bogies: 2,000 mm (6 ft 7 in)
- Maximum speed: 80 km/h (50 mph)
- Weight: Unladen: 98 t (96 long tons; 108 short tons); At crush load: 141 t (139 long tons; 155 short tons)
- Axle load: 12.5 t (12.3 long tons; 13.8 short tons) max.
- Traction system: IGBT-VVVF
- Traction motors: 8 × TSA TMF 41-17-4, each of 120 kW (160 hp)
- Power output: At wheels: Max.: 1,320 kW (1,770 hp); Cont.: 942 kW (1,263 hp)
- Tractive effort: Starting: 140 kN (31,000 lb_{f})
- Acceleration: Starting: 1.35 m/s^{2} (4.4 ft/s^{2})
- Electric systems: Overhead line, 1,500 V DC
- Current collection: Pantograph
- UIC classification: 2′(Bo)′(Bo)′(Bo)′(Bo)′2′
- Braking systems: Electro-pneumatic (disc) and regenerative, plus magnetic
- Safety systems: Indusi; (plus provision for ETCS)
- Coupling system: Dellner type 12
- Multiple working: Within class
- Seating: Longitudinal
- Track gauge: 4 ft 8 1/2 in (1,435 mm) standard gauge

Notes/references
- Sourced from except where otherwise noted.

The British Rail Class 555 Metro is a class of electric multiple units, commissioned and built for Nexus (the Tyne and Wear Passenger Transport Executive) by the Swiss company Stadler Rail, at a total cost of £362 million, for use on the Tyne and Wear Metro. For operation on Network Rail controlled tracks between Pelaw Junction and Sunderland, they are designated on TOPS as the Class 555.

Tyne and Wear Metrocars were in use since the system opened in 1980. In 2016, Nexus began work to replace these trains, with Stadler Rail chosen in January 2020, and the order of 46 trains confirmed in March 2020. The Metro Fleet Depot in Gosforth was completely rebuilt to house the new fleet, and 40 of the 60 stations have had platform heights modified. On 18 December 2024, the first unit entered passenger service. By February 2026, all 46 new trains had been delivered, with withdrawal from routine service of the existing trains completed in June 2026.

== History ==
=== Background and procurement ===
Tyne and Wear Metrocars have been in use since the Tyne and Wear Metro opened in 1980, and had last been refurbished in the early 2010s. In 2016, Nexus announced a consultation to determine the views of its customers in the design of its planned new fleet of trains. At the time, the operator had completed a life-extending refurbishment on its existing fleet that was intended to take it up to its planned life-expiry date, which was estimated for the early to mid 2020s.

In 2018, Nexus began the procurement process to purchase a new fleet of trains, with its initial proposal for a total of 42 units, each of five cars, to replace the 89 existing sets, with an option to order another four units to cope with passenger demand. The successful bidder would design, build and maintain the trains over a period of 35 years. In June 2019, three bidders were shortlisted by Nexus – Stadler Rail, Hitachi Rail and CAF.

In January 2020, Nexus selected Stadler Rail's Metro platform as the basis for its new trains. Two months later, Nexus received funding for an additional four units, taking the total up to 46.

=== Construction and commissioning ===
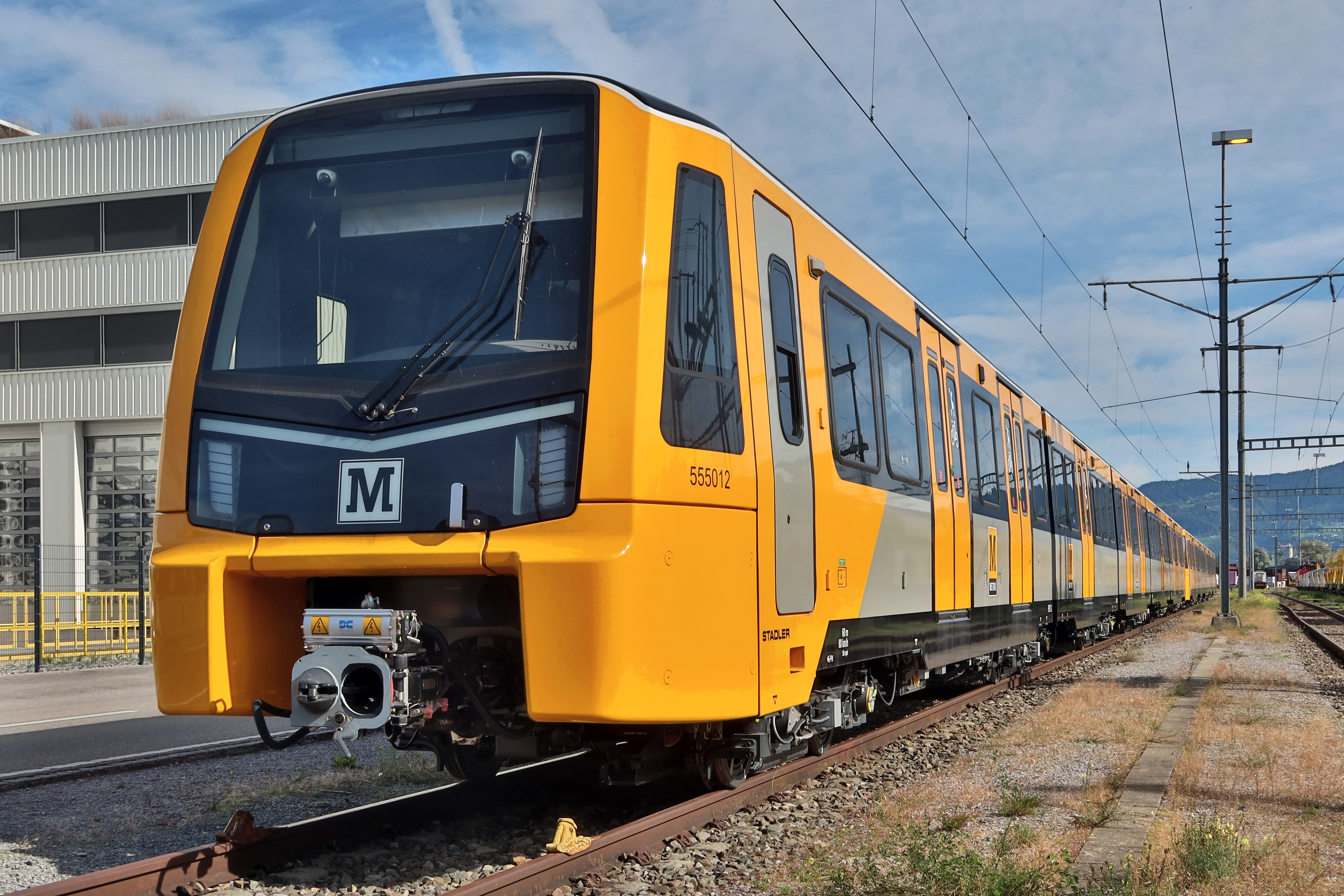
Class 555 on a SBB siding at St. Margrethen in Switzerland, prior to delivery

Construction of the first Class 555 units began in 2021, with delivery of the first unit on the Metro network occurring in early 2023 for testing and commissioning. Two units were extensively tested at a test track, based in Velim in the Czech Republic.

In September 2020, Nexus undertook a second public consultation to ask for opinions on how the interior of the new trains should be designed, related to the seating, grab poles and space for bike racks. At the same time, Nexus' drivers were consulted on the design of their cabs using virtual reality software, and in March 2021, took delivery of a physical cab mock-up built by ROBUR Prototyping in Chemnitz, Germany and shipped to the Gosforth Depot. A cab consultation period was carried out between March and April 2021 with over 200 operational staff taking part. Unlike the previous fleet, which had only a half-width driver's cab at each end, with the other half occupied by passenger seating, the new units will have a full-width driving position.

The trains are five cars long, in fixed formations, with a Jacobs bogie between the inner cars. One centre car will be fitted with a Brecknell Willis pantograph to draw the power from the 1,500 V DC overhead lines. They are also fitted with regenerative braking technology for greater energy efficiency, and a battery energy storage system that will allow the trains to remain powered and reach the nearest station if the overhead lines fail.

The trains will feature specially designed retractable steps at the doors, which are designed to bridge the gap between the train and the platform. They will have an overall capacity of 600 passengers, with 104 seats, specially designed easy access areas and have CCTV, a new passenger information system, USB charging points and air conditioning throughout the saloon.

In December 2021, Nexus announced that the Metro fleet had entered the final assembly phase at Stadler's factory in Switzerland and that the manufacturer was fitting the main interior components of the first of the new trains. The works include the installation of wheels, seats, equipment cases, piping, wiring, flooring, windows and other internal furnishings.

In February 2023, eight Metro drivers undertook initial training on the new units on the 4-kilometre (2.5-mile) Velim test track. The first of the trains arrived on Tyneside on 28 February 2023, to undergo compatibility testing across the network before entering into service later that year. Nexus later revised the introduction date to early 2024, and in January 2024 the date was again revised to the end of that year.

=== Introduction into service ===
A Class 555 train on a test run in July 2024, arriving at South Gosforth

In May 2023, the first of the new Metro fleet entered the network for the first time for testing. Cathy Massarella, Nexus's major projects director, said to the BBC: "[The] train has completed its first test run out on the network and performed really well". The train was pictured at Four Lane Ends during the test service from South Gosforth to Monkseaton in the early hours of 10 May 2023.

In March 2024, it was announced that there is no confirmed date for the trains to enter service. However, in May 2024, daytime testing of the new trains began. As the trains were running in between regular passenger services they were equipped with netting across the doors and notices advising customers not to board.

By August 2024, three of the first nine units delivered had completed their daytime testing and the focus was moving to driver training.

The first unit entered revenue service on the Yellow Line on 18 December 2024, initially operating on weekdays only. The first train entered service on the Green Line two months later, on 18 February 2025. By the end of 2025, half of the new fleet had entered service, with training of drivers completed.

In February 2026, the last unit was delivered by Stadler, with Nexus announcing in June 2026 that the older Metrocar trains will be withdrawn at the end of June.

== Design ==
As part of the Stadler Metro train family, the units are built on the same platform as the Berlin U-Bahn IK stock, Glasgow Subway G3 stock, and future units being developed for the Minsk Metro.

Illustrated floorplan of Tyne and Wear Metro fleet

== Infrastructure upgrades ==
To facilitate the delivery of the new fleet, Nexus has commissioned work to replace or modify several aspects of the network.

These have included the total demolition and rebuilding of the Metro Fleet Depot in Gosforth, requiring construction of a new temporary depot at Howdon to provide alternative stabling and maintenance facilities whilst Gosforth Depot is rebuilt. Construction of the new 12-acre (49,000 m^{2}) depot at Gosforth was completed in January 2024. Raising or lowering the track at 40 of the network's 60 stations to facilitate use of the new door system was also required, costing a total of £2 million. This work was started in October 2020.

In July 2025, the government announced it would fund a replacement signalling system for the Metro.
