= Tyne and Wear Metrocar =

Light rail vehicles used on the Tyne and Wear Metro

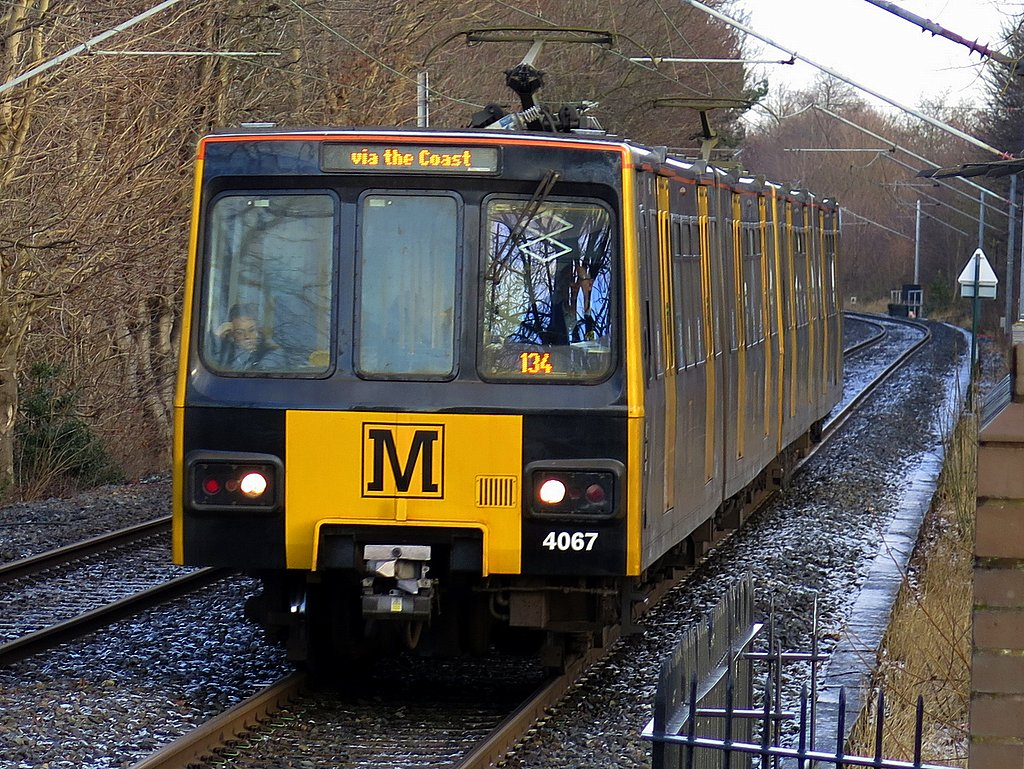
- A Metrocar in black and yellow corporate livery at Meadow Well (2018)

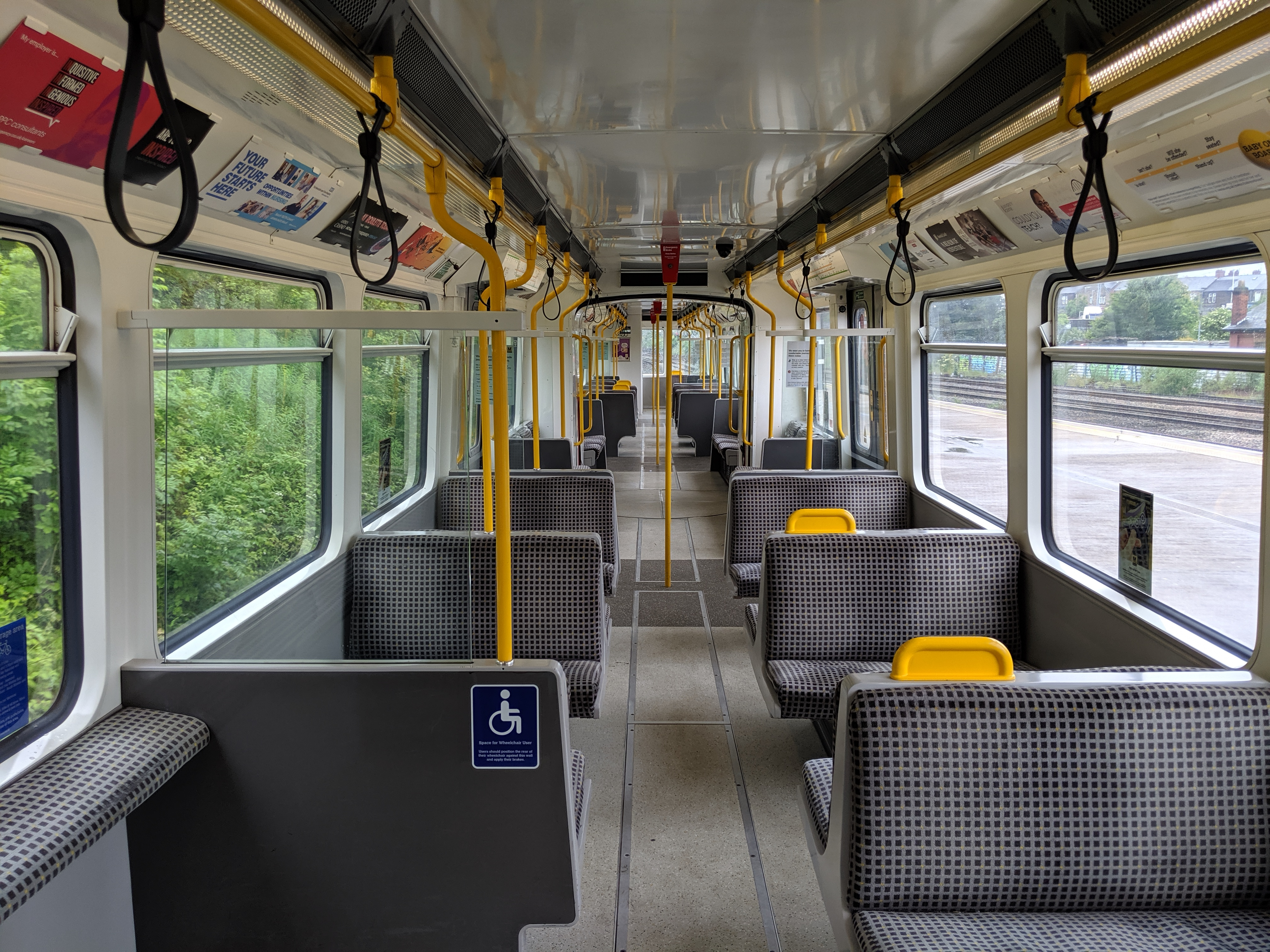
- Refurbished interior of a Metrocar
- Stock type: Electric multiple unit
- Manufacturer: Metro-Cammell
- Built at: Washwood Heath, Birmingham
- Constructed: 1975–1981
- Entered service: 11 August 1980
- Refurbished: 1996–2000, 2010–2015
- Retired: 26 June 2026 (withdrawn from regular service)
- Number built: 90
- Number preserved: 2
- Number scrapped: 19
- Successor: Class 555
- Formation: Two carriages
- Fleet numbers: Tyne and Wear Metro: 4001–4090; (TOPS: 599001–599090)
- Capacity: 64 seated, 188 standing
- Operator: Nexus
- Depots: Howdon, South Gosforth
- Lines served: All Tyne and Wear Metro lines

Specifications
- Car body construction: Aluminium and steel
- Car length: 27.8 m (91 ft 2 in)
- Width: 2.65 m (8 ft 8 in)
- Height: 3.16 m (10 ft 4 in)
- Doors: 4 sets of air-operated double doors on each side
- Maximum speed: 50 mph (80 km/h)
- Weight: 40 t (39 long tons; 44 short tons)
- Power output: 2 × 185 kW (248 hp) per unit
- Electric systems: 1,500 V DC overhead lines
- Current collection: Pantograph (Brecknell Willis)
- Coupling system: BSI
- Multiple working: Within class
- Track gauge: 4 ft 8 1/2 in (1,435 mm) standard gauge

The Tyne and Wear Metrocar is a light rail vehicle used on the Tyne and Wear Metro in North East England. Ninety units were manufactured between 1978 and 1981 by Metro-Cammell and are designated on TOPS as the British Rail Class 599.

Trains were refurbished between 1996 and 2000, and between 2010 and 2015. Since 2024, they have been gradually replaced by new Class 555 electric multiple units, built by Stadler Rail. The last scheduled Metrocar service was on 26 June 2026.

== Design ==
The Metrocar design was partly derived from that of the German Stadtbahnwagen B; however, they were built by Metro-Cammell in Birmingham, and were not fitted with the lights and indicators that would have allowed them to run on streets.

Each Metrocar consists of two semi-permanently connected coaches mounted on three bogies. The outermost bogies are powered and the central Jacobs Bogie, located in the articulated section between both halves, is unpowered. The trains make use of rheostatic braking between 50 and 19 mph (80 and 30 km/h), with air-operated disc brakes for use during the final stages of deceleration below 19 mph (30 km/h). All bogies are also equipped with a pair of emergency magnetic track brakes, which can be used to bring a train to a complete stand in as little as 150 m (492 ft) from the maximum service speed of 50 mph (80 km/h). Metrocars have three acceleration steps and four braking steps, with an additional emergency brake step which drops the emergency magnetic track brakes.

Many features of the Metrocar are operated by compressed air, which is stored in a reservoir under the driving cab at the front of the train; these include: air-operated disc brakes, horn, windscreen wipers and passenger doors, as well as being used to raise the pantograph. As the section between Pelaw and Sunderland on which they operate is part of the Network Rail system, the units were allocated TOPS Class 599 in January 2002.

Specification
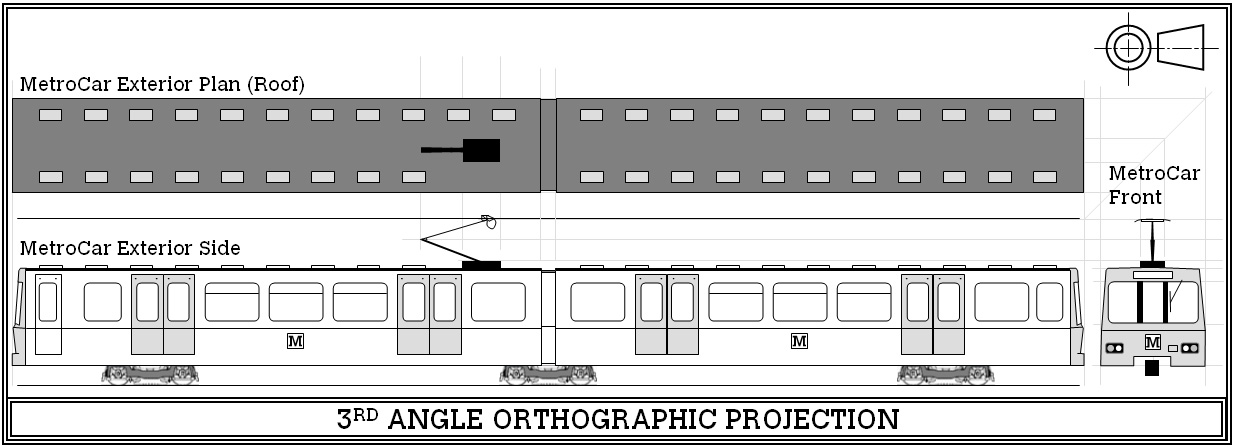
Metrocar external details (third-angle projection)

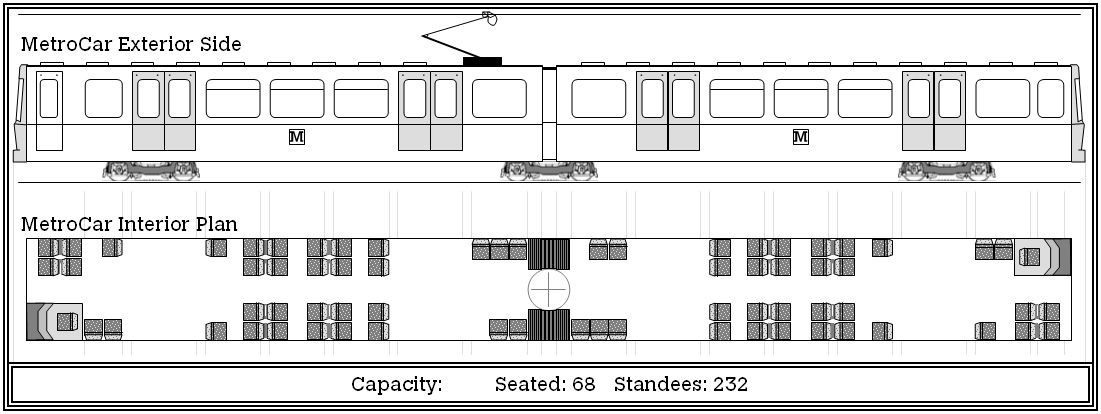
Metrocar internal details (first-angle projection)

=== Prototypes and test track ===
Prior to opening, two prototypes, 4001 and 4002, underwent several years of testing from June 1975 on a 1.5-mile (2.4 km) test track in Backworth. The track was built on the route of an old mineral wagonway formerly part of the North Tyneside Steam Railway. It had a two-lane car shed and a mock station platform, along with a short tunnel section which consisted of concrete tunnel segments laid at ground level; the tunnel was later demolished to allow testing of prototype cars for the Hong Kong MTR, also built by Metro-Cammell, since these cars have a very large profile. The test track was closed in 1980 and it is now home to the Stephenson Railway Museum.

The prototype cars are very similar to the production fleet, with the exception of being fitted with passenger doors manufactured by Kiekert instead of Westinghouse, having a central end door and using different types of coupling equipment at each end to allow the two designs to be thoroughly tested. The prototypes featured small cabs and central end doors similar to London Underground stock, to allow evacuation of trains in a tunnel. In the event, the Metro tunnels were constructed with continuous walkways, making the end doors unnecessary. Prior to their entry into service in 1987, the two prototypes were refitted to reflect the specification of the production fleet. The small cabs remained in the series vehicles with a passenger seat beside offering a forward view.

== Electrics ==
The network is electrified with a 1,500 V DC overhead line system. This voltage was previously used on a number of railways in Great Britain, including the Woodhead line, but is now unique. Each Metrocar has its own Brecknell Willis pantograph for collecting power from the overhead line. The sections of Metro owned by Nexus have a maximum speed of 50 mph (80 km/h) in some areas, which matches the top speed of the rolling stock. The vehicles have a minimum curve radius of 50 m (160 ft), although there are no curves this tight except for the non-passenger chord between Manors and West Jesmond.

== Formation ==
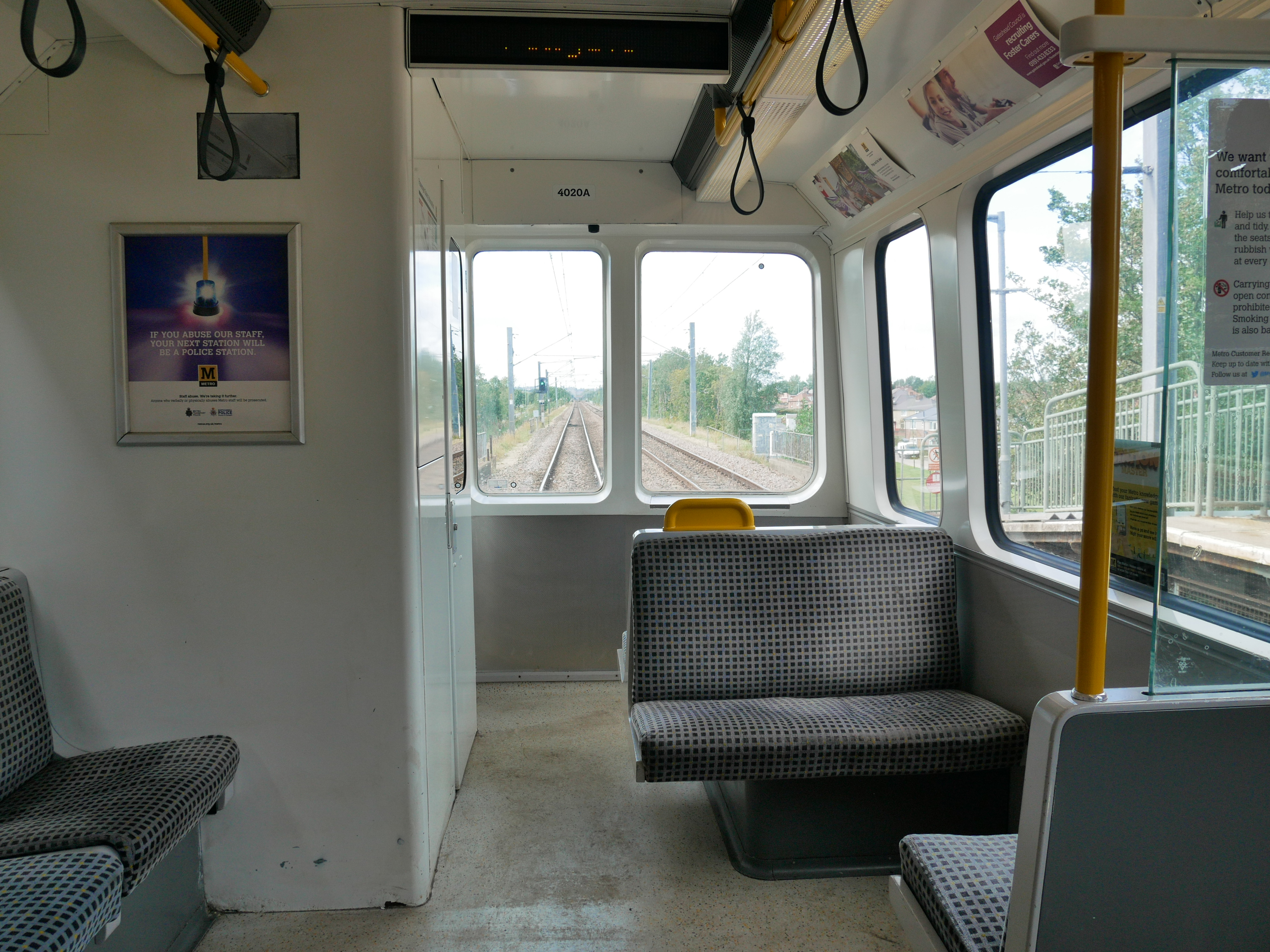
The Metrocars have a half-width driver's cab, allowing passengers to see out of the front and rear of the train

During the early years of the Tyne and Wear Metro, units were operated in single and double sets. As single units became overcrowded, Nexus resumed using two units as standard. Single units again became common during construction of the Sunderland extension, when some units were taken for testing of the new track.

During its original construction, the Metro system was designed to use three unit sets, and the underground stations were built with 95 m-long (312 ft) platforms to accommodate this; however, due to a lack of funding, new surface stations were only built with 65 m (213 ft) platforms and the units run in sets of two.

== Refurbishment ==
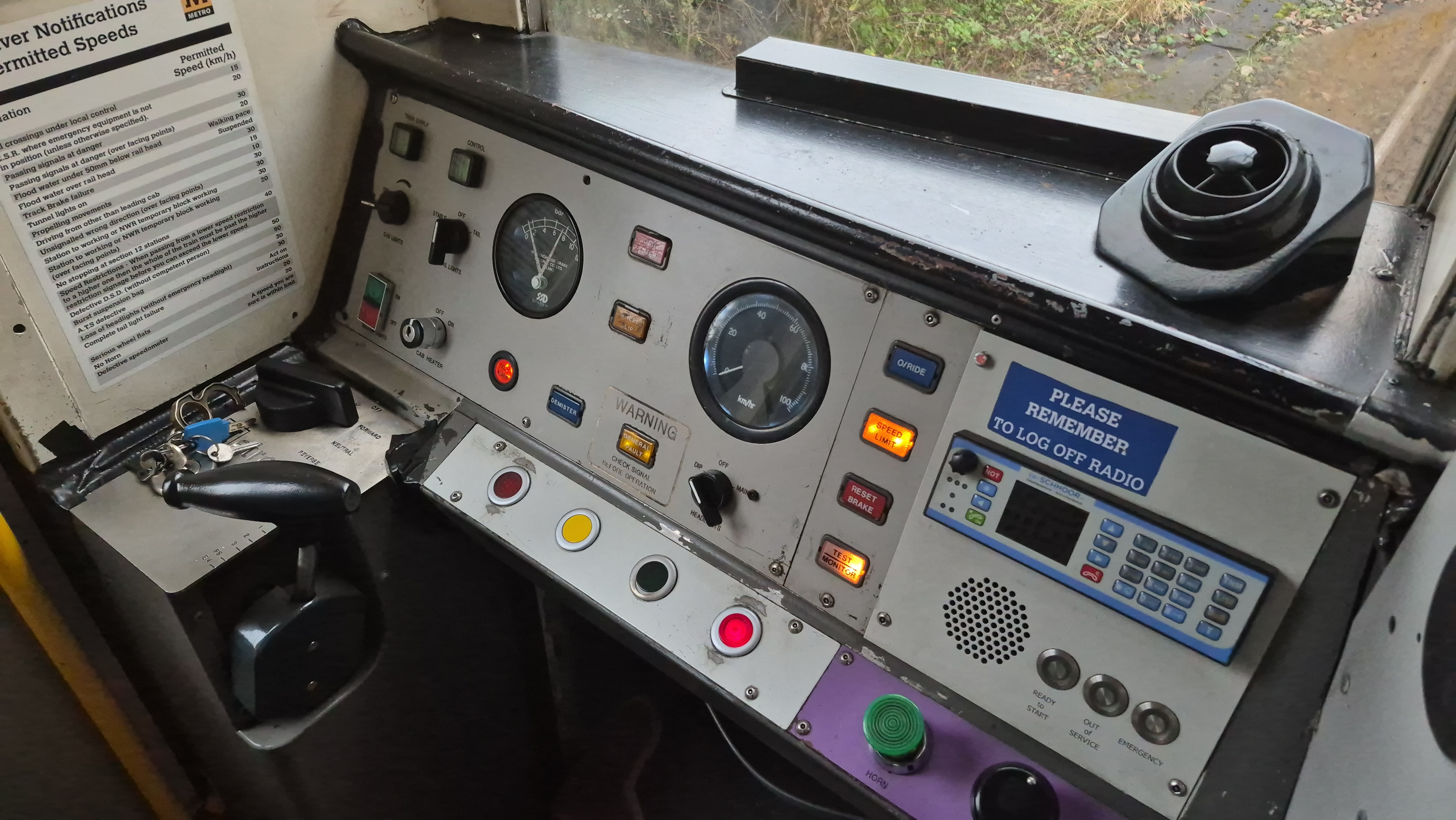
Driver's cab, showing the front panel

All 90 units underwent a half life refurbishment between 1996 and 2000. In June 2010, Wabtec Rail was awarded a contract to perform a three-quarter life refurbishment at Doncaster Works, which included making them compliant with the Disability Discrimination Act 1995.

The first was completed in February 2012, with the last in July 2015. Cost overruns and technical issues resulted in only 86 being completed, with units 4001, 4002, 4040 and 4083 remaining in service in unrefurbished condition. As they did not comply with the Disability Discrimination Act 1995, they were restricted to operating peak hour services.

After an accident at Gosforth in March 2017, unit 4022 was taken to Bristol Barton Hill TMD for assessment, before moving to the Nemesis Rail facility at Burton-on-Trent in October 2019 for scrapping.

== Liveries ==
The Metro fleet was initially painted in a two-tone livery of cadmium yellow and white, that matched the Metro station design and the livery of the Tyne and Wear bus fleet until 1986.

In 1995, a new colour scheme was introduced: solid red, green or blue, with a yellow wedge at each end and yellow triangles on the doors. This scheme was modified slightly in 2005 to comply with safety regulations, changing the doors to a solid yellow to comply with the Disability Discrimination Act 1995. During this period, a large number of special liveries were carried in addition to the standard colour scheme; these were often advertisements for local businesses, such as the Evening Chronicle on unit 4042 and Metroland on unit 4054. To celebrate the Golden Jubilee of Elizabeth II in 2002, unit 4032 was temporarily decorated in a special gold livery; it was then returned to the red and yellow livery which it carried until refurbishment.

Between 2012 and 2015, 86 Metrocars were refurbished and repainted in a black and yellow livery. Until 2017, prototype unit 4001 carried its original cadmium and white livery, whilst 4002 carried an advertisement for the Tyne and Wear Metro website. Both were repainted in 2017 into the same black and yellow livery carried by the refurbished Metrocars. In September 2019, unit 4001 underwent further repainting into a 40 Years scheme, with all four previous liveries amalgamated into one.

Metrocar livery and branding
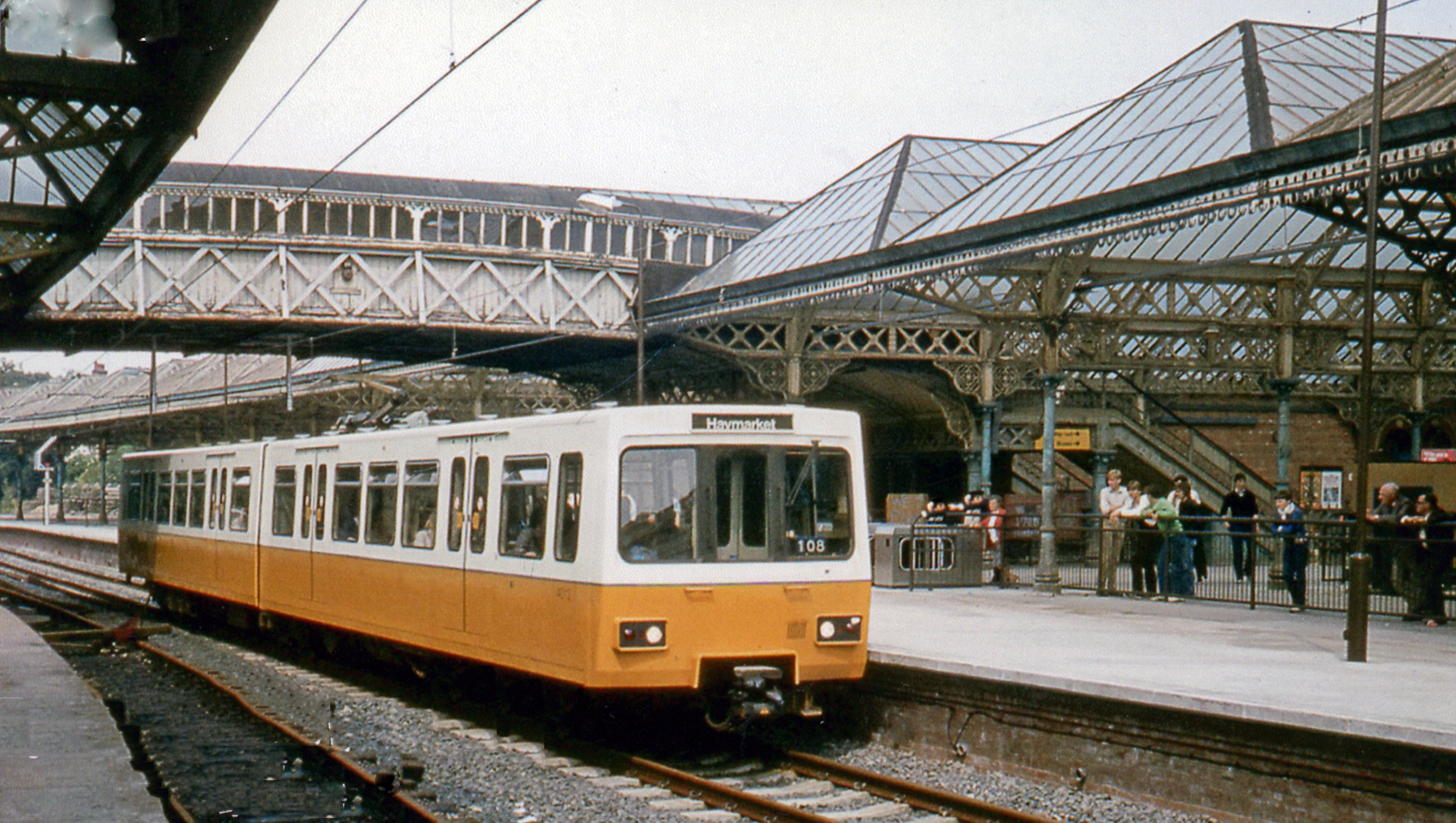
1980–1990s

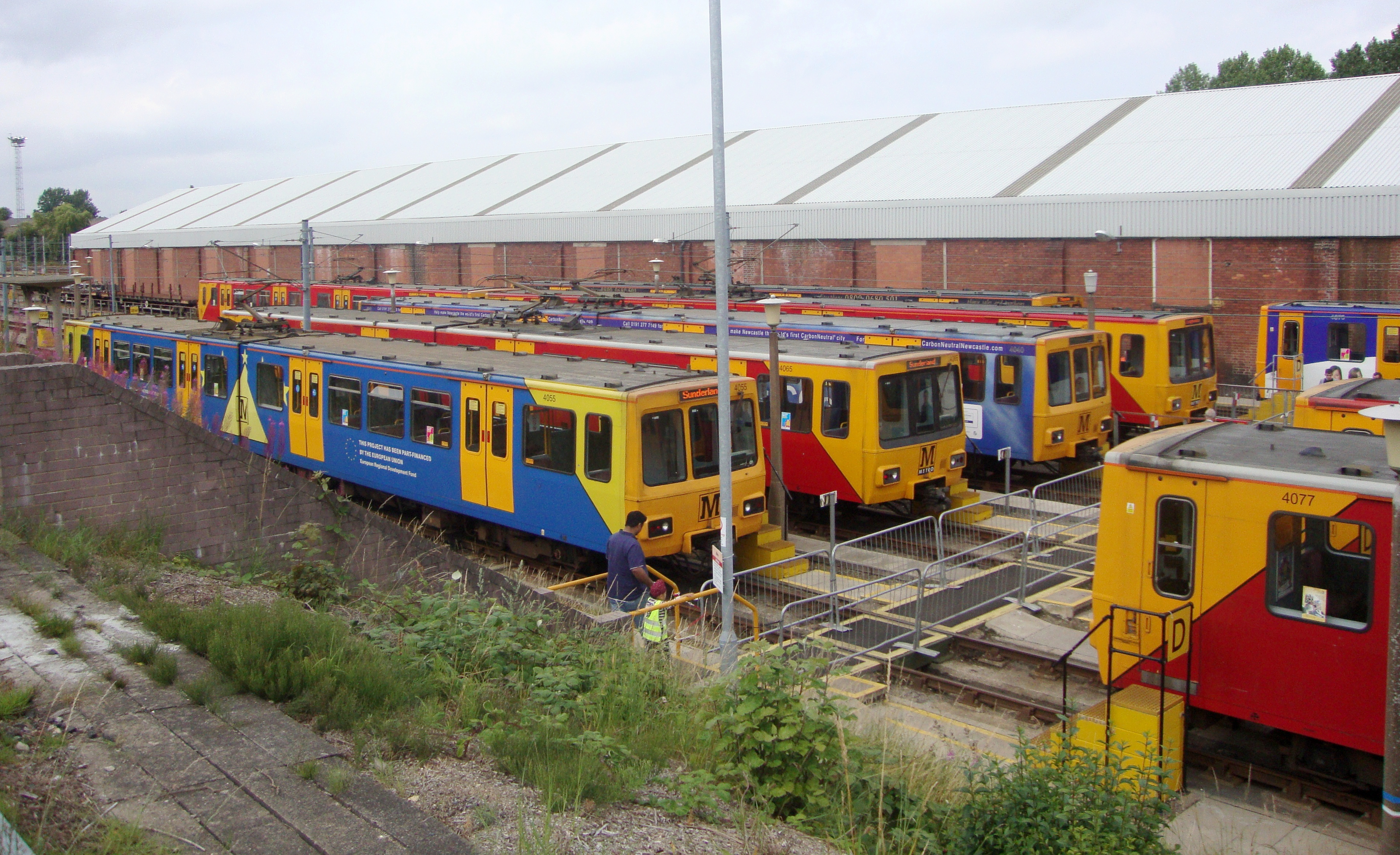
1990s–2010s

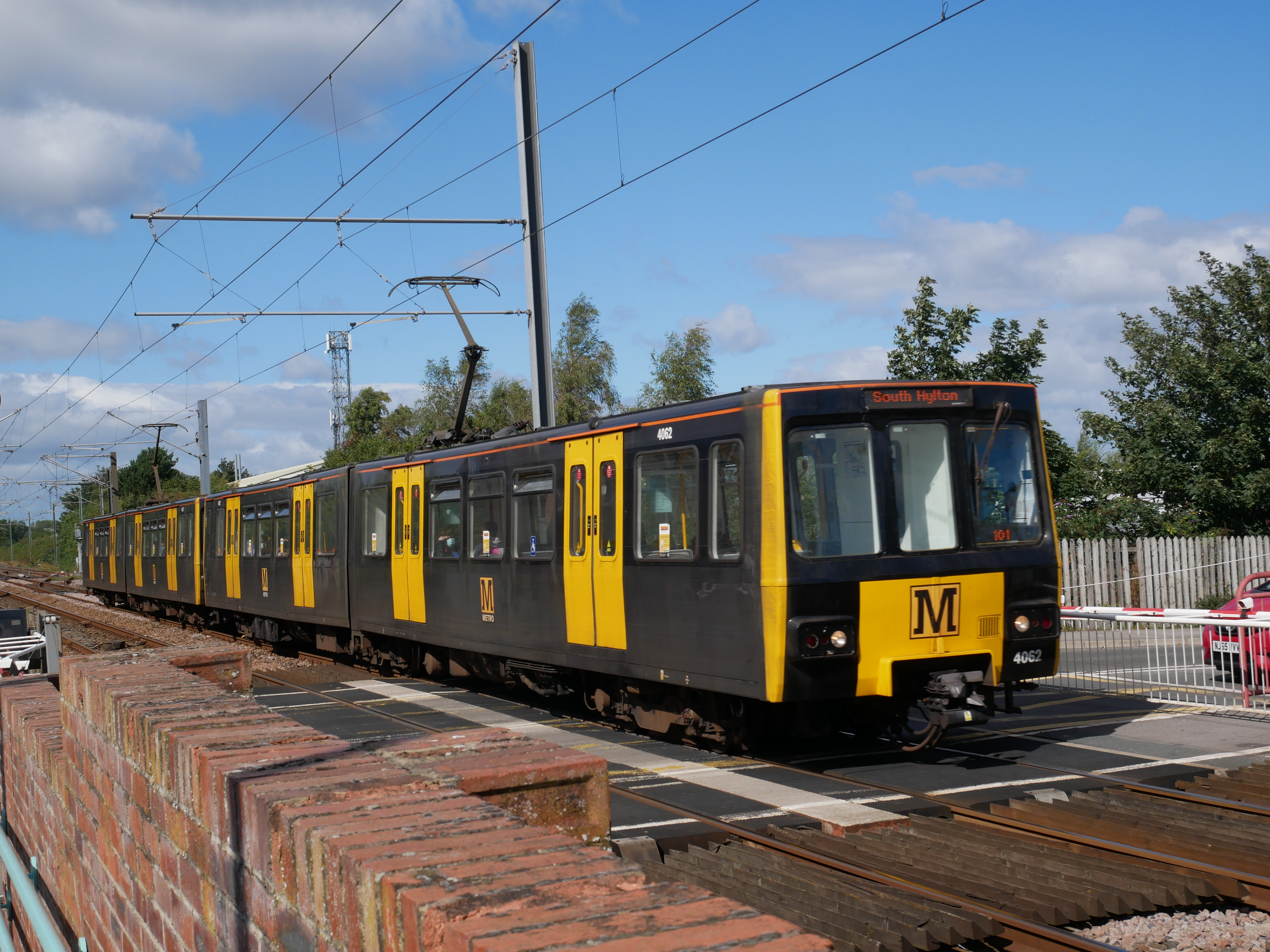
2010s–2026

== Replacement ==
In January 2020, Stadler Rail was awarded a contract to build 42 five-carriage Class 555 articulated light rail trains to replace the Metrocars, with deliveries scheduled to commence in late 2022. The order was later increased to 46. This was part of a £362 million programme, which included a new depot.

After receiving feedback from 23,000 people, Nexus added an additional 12 tip-up seats, handrails in the wheelchair areas, brighter markings and changes to the interior design of the trains. The first of the Stadler trains entered service in December 2024.

In February 2026, Nexus announced that it expected the last of the Metrocars would "be taken out of service in late spring to early summer 2026." In June 2026, it stated that their last week of service would commence on 22 June, with a Metrocar operating on both the Yellow and Green lines from 9.30am to 5.30pm all week.

The last scheduled Metrocar services operated on 26 June 2026, although Nexus added that "customers may still see the occasional 599 around the Metro system after this date."

== Preservation ==
In March 2023, it was announced that unit 4001 would be preserved at the Stephenson Railway Museum in North Shields, on the site of the original Metro test track. The unit entered preservation in September 2025.

In September 2025, unit 4019 was donated to the Tyne and Wear Fire and Rescue Service training centre in Washington for use in firefighter training.

On 1 July 2026, unit 4020 which carries a sticker to celebrate Queen Elizabeth II's Platinum Jubilee in 2022, and carried the Queen when she officially opened the network in 1981, was donated to the North East Land, Sea and Air Museums (NELSAM). It was originally announced that this unit would be donated to Beamish Museum.

A plan to donate a number of units to the community was abandoned due to the expected cost.
