= Gosforth Depot =

Tyne and Wear Metro depot

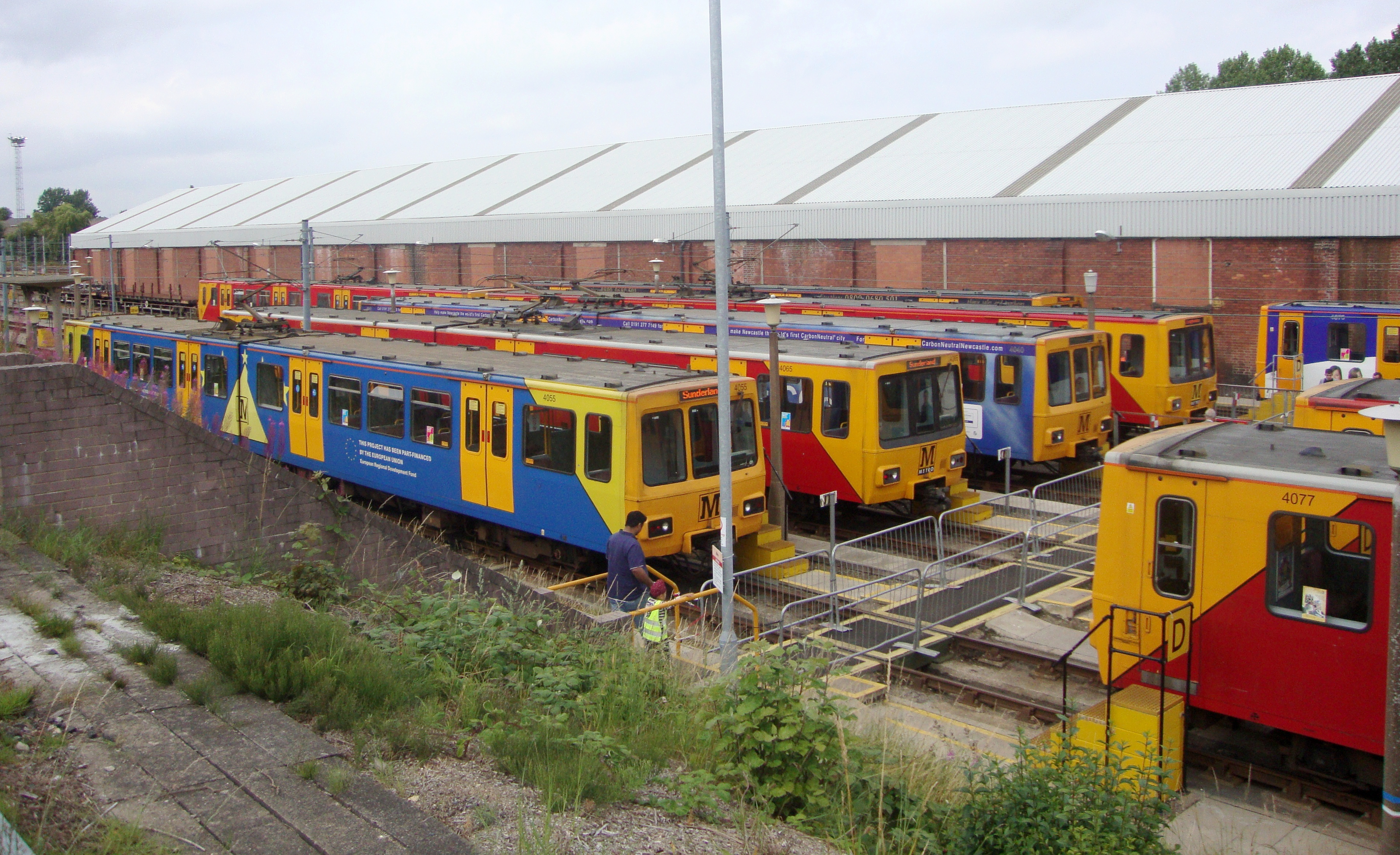
- Class 599 Metrocars stabled alongside the old Gosforth Depot shed

- Location within Tyne and Wear

Location
- Location: Gosforth, Newcastle upon Tyne; England
- Coordinates: 55°00′39″N 1°36′32″W
- OS grid: NZ251685

Characteristics
- Owner: Tyne and Wear PTE
- Operator: Tyne and Wear Metro
- Type: Light rail
- Roads: 17
- Rolling stock: Class 555 Metro; Class 599 Metrocar

History
- Opened: October 1923; 103 years ago
- Original: London and North Eastern Railway
- Post-grouping: London and North Eastern Railway; British Rail (North Eastern)
- Former depot code: GF

Gosforth Depot is a vehicle cleaning, maintenance and stabling facility used by the Tyne and Wear Metro, located in Gosforth, Newcastle upon Tyne in Tyne and Wear, England. It is owned by Nexus but maintained by Stadler.

The depot is located in a triangle of land between Longbenton, Regent Centre and South Gosforth, and can be accessed by trains from all three adjacent stations.

== History ==
=== Pre-Tyne and Wear Metro ===
In 1904, the North Eastern Railway (NER) started to electrify some of its lines in what is now Tyne and Wear, using the third rail system. Initially electric trains operated only from Newcastle New Bridge Street to Benton station, but in stages electrification was extended to create the system known as the Tyneside Electrics. The trains for this system were, at first, stabled at carriage sheds in Heaton.

The year after the first electric trains ran, the 8 1/4-mile (13 km) single-track branch line of the Gosforth and Ponteland Railway was opened, connecting to the NER line by a triangular junction just north of South Gosforth station. The line closed to passengers in 1929, only to reopen as part of the Metro, but freight services continuing to serve the line until the late 1980s, latterly sharing the track with Metro trains.

In 1918, a fire broke out at the Heaton carriage sheds, which destroyed the building, as well as 34 units. A replacement depot was required, and the NER acquired a site on the northern side of the South Gosforth triangular junction in 1921. The replacement depot opened in October 1923. At the time, there were ten lines in the depot building, with a further two serving the repair shop.

The depot was originally used to house rolling stock for the Tyneside Electrics network, which served Gateshead, Newcastle upon Tyne, North and South Tyneside. Owing to falling passenger numbers during the 1960s, as well as rising costs, and the need to renew life expired infrastructure and rolling stock, the network was de-electrified and converted to diesel multiple unit operation in 1967. Following this, Class 101, 104 and 105 DMUs were a common sight at the depot.

=== Tyne and Wear Metro ===
In 1978, passenger service on the North Tyneside Loop ceased, in order to facilitate its conversion to become part of the Tyne and Wear Metro. The South Gosforth depot was transferred to the Metro in 1980, to be used for stabling, cleaning, maintaining and repairing the fleet of Class 599 Metrocar.

On 19 July 2016, the North East Combined Authority (now the North East Mayoral Strategic Authority) approved Nexus' "Metro Futures" strategy which, in addition to a new fleet of trains that became the Class 555 fleet, also included an interest in updated depot facilities. On 8 June 2018, an open tender was launched for a contract to build the new fleet and to build and run a new depot at the existing site in Gosforth. To stable some of the fleet while the new Gosforth Depot was being built, Nexus also ordered that a temporary second depot, Howdon Satellite Depot, would be built. On 28 January 2020, it was announced that Stadler had won this contract, and that the new Gosforth Depot would cost £70 million. On 15 June 2020, Stadler appointed VolkerFitzpatrick as the principal engineering and construction firm for the new Gosforth Depot, and many of the new facilities planned for Gosforth Depot were made public.

As part of the depot refurbishment project, the first phase of demolition of the depot was completed in May 2021, with final closure in January 2023. Construction of the new 12-acre (4.9 ha) depot was completed in January 2024. The new facility provides facilities for preventative and corrective maintenance, overhauls, train presentation, storage space for parts and materials supplies and office space for training and support functions. In addition, there are inspection roads and pits, a separate wheel lathe building, a wash-plant to clean train exteriors, a component drop, monorail cranes on light maintenance roads, an overhead crane on heavy maintenance roads for lifting roof components and a new control room to manage train movements.
