= Stadtbahnwagen B =

Light rail car used in Germany

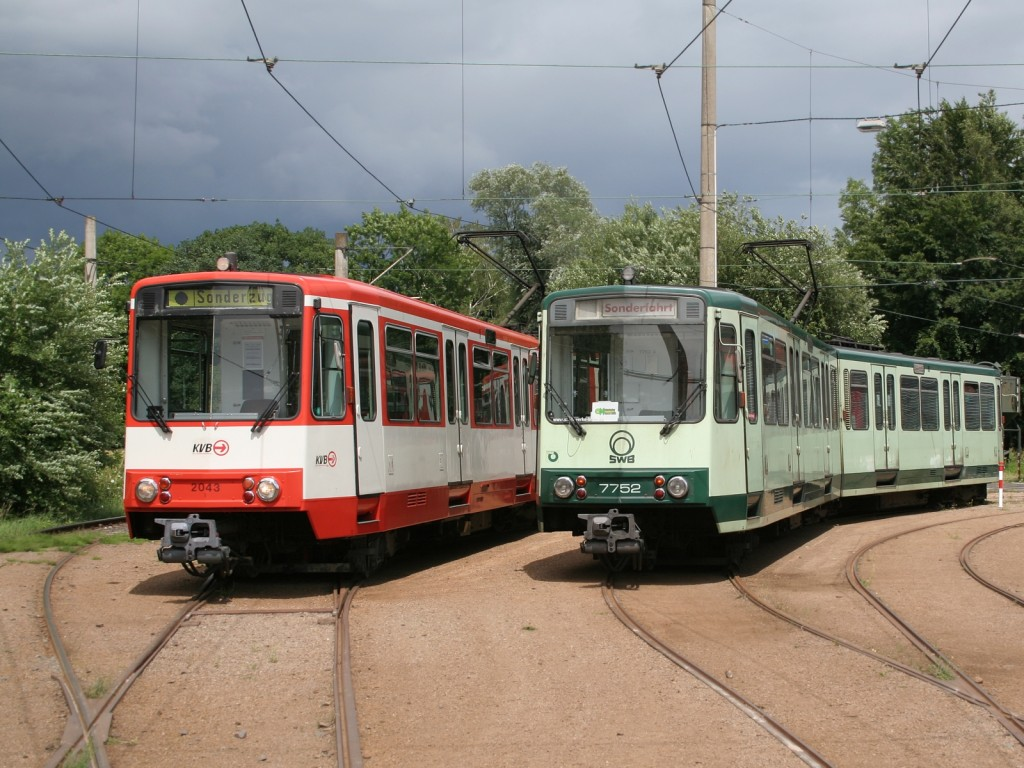
- Types B100S from Cologne and Bonn
- Stock type: Light Rail Vehicle/Tramcar
- Manufacturers: Structure: Duewag; Traction system: Siemens, Kiepe, Waggon Union, BBC, ABB, Adtranz HeiterBlick (B80D Dortmund)
- Built at: Duewag factory Lierenfeld, Waggon Union factory Borsigwalde (Cologne only), Siemens factory Uerdingen (Bursa only), Felgenhauer factory Jasień / HeiterBlick factory Neulindenau (B80D Dortmund)
- Constructed: 1973–2002; 2022–present (B80D Dortmund)
- Number built: 520
- Number preserved: 1 (KVB 2012)

Specifications
- Train length: 28.0 m (91 ft 10 3/8 in); 38.0 m (124 ft 8 1/8 in) (B8 Dortmund)
- Width: 2.65 m (8 ft 8 3/8 in)
- Maximum speed: 100 km/h (62 mph) (B100 models); 80 km/h (50 mph) (B80 models)
- Weight: 39 t (38.4 long tons; 43.0 short tons)
- Traction system: Camshaft resistor control (B80S / B100S); DC chopper control (B80C / B100C); Three-phase AC traction (B80D; converter and mechanical drive layout vary by series)
- Traction motors: DC (B100S / B80S, B80C / B100C); Three-phase AC (B80D)
- Power output: B100S: 2×235 kW (315 hp)=470 kW (630 hp); B80D Cologne: 4×195 kW (261 hp)=780 kW (1,046 hp) (one-hour rating); B80D Bochum: 4×136 kW (182 hp)=544 kW (730 hp); B80C Dortmund: 2×222 kW (298 hp)=444 kW (595 hp); B80D Dortmund: 4×105 kW (141 hp)=420 kW (563 hp); B80D Düsseldorf: 2×220 kW (295 hp)=440 kW (590 hp)
- Acceleration: 1.1 m/s^{2} (2.5 mph/s) (typical; configuration-dependent)
- Deceleration: 2.7 m/s^{2} (6.0 mph/s) emergency braking (typical; configuration-dependent)
- Electric systems: 750 V DC (Germany); 1,500 V DC (Bursa)
- UIC classification: B′2′B′ (monomotor versions); Bo′2′Bo′ (individually driven B80D versions; Bochum, Cologne and Dortmund); B′2′2′B′ (Dortmund B80C/8)
- Braking systems: Electric braking (rheostatic and/or regenerative, depending on variant), spring-applied electro-penumatic brakes, magnetic track brakes
- Track gauge: 1,435 mm (4 ft 8 1/2 in) standard gauge

The Stadtbahnwagen Typ B (translation Type "B" Light Rail Vehicle, short form B-Wagen) is a light rail vehicle used by several Stadtbahn networks in the German state of North Rhine-Westphalia as well as by the Bursaray network in Bursa, Turkey. It was mainly developed by Düsseldorf-based Duewag, who also built the majority of vehicles in a consortium with Siemens and Kiepe. A small series of ten units was built by Waggon Union in Berlin. The first prototypes – two to Cologne and one to Bonn– were delivered in 1973.

As the type evolved over two decades of production, some vehicles have little more in common than their outer dimensions and the basic configuration of a two-part multiple unit on three bogies with both outer ones powered. For the Dortmund Stadtbahn, some cars were modified with a central section and a fourth bogie. These vehicles are referred to as B8 or B80C/8 (eight axles). These vehicles have a length of 38 m (124 ft 8 1/8 in) and a weight of 49 t (48 long tons; 54 short tons). Dortmund has also ordered 34 newly built B-Wagen of the B80D/Vamos HF type; deliveries are scheduled to be completed by the end of 2027.

== History ==
When the Rhine-Ruhr Stadtbahn network was planned in the early 1970s, standardised rolling stock was planned as well. At the same time, a second Stadtbahn network was planned for Cologne and Bonn. Because the future Cologne Stadtbahn already had one finished tunnel, that was built with the city's own money with streetcars in mind, the Stadtbahnwagen designed for the Rhine-Ruhr network was not suitable. So, another vehicle was designed for the Cologne/Bonn network, that was capable of driving through tighter curves.

This vehicle, now referred to as Stadtbahnwagen Typ B was immediately ordered by transport authorities in Cologne and Bonn, while Rhine-Ruhr authorities remained hesitant about "their" vehicle, now renamed Stadtbahnwagen Typ A. Eventually it was decided that the type "A" LRV was too unwieldy and type "B" LRVs were ordered by Essen, Mülheim, Düsseldorf, Duisburg, Dortmund and Bochum. The type "A" concept, which consists of close coupled two-car sets, was shelved and later revived for the Stuttgart Stadtbahn.

The Typ B formed the basis for the British-built Metrocars on the Tyne and Wear Metro, which opened in 1980. It was adapted for the Americas and sold under the Siemens brand as the SD-400/460 from 1985 to 2005. The Typ B also formed the basis for the vehicles used on the Docklands Light Railway (DLR), which opened in 1987.

=== Replacement ===
In the German cities the Typ B is being replaced by different models from different manufacturers:

- Bochum: Stadler Tango
- Bonn: Bombardier Flexity Swift (K5000) and CAF HF
- Cologne: Bombardier Flexity Swift (K5000, K5200, HF6)
- Dortmund: HeiterBlick Vamos HF (B80D)
- Düsseldorf: Bombardier Flexity Swift (HF6) and Siemens Avenio HF
- Duisburg: Siemens Avenio HF
- Essen: CAF HF1

== Subtypes ==
Different variants are usually referred to by a combination of their top speed and a letter denoting the engine type.

B100S	100 km/h (62 mph), SIMATIC-Schaltwerksteuerung (SIMATIC-regulated camshaft control)
B80C	80 km/h (50 mph), Chopper control
B80D	80 km/h (50 mph), Drehstromantrieb (three-phase motors)

The B80D designation describes the use of three-phase traction motors, but it does not denote a single standardised mechanical drive arrangement. The Düsseldorf B80D has one longitudinal 220 kW (295 hp) three-phase motor in each of its two powered bogies; each motor drives both axles of its bogie through two gearboxes. By contrast, Reinhardt describes the Cologne B80D of series 2200/2300 as having two individual 195 kW (261 hp) drives in each powered bogie, giving four traction motors and a combined one-hour rating of 780 kW (1,046 hp) per car. A 2025 KVB motor-maintenance tender identifies the traction-machine component used on series 2200 and 2300 as the Siratrac Stator. The Bochum B80D used four individual axle drives rated at 136 kW (182 hp) each in its original configuration.

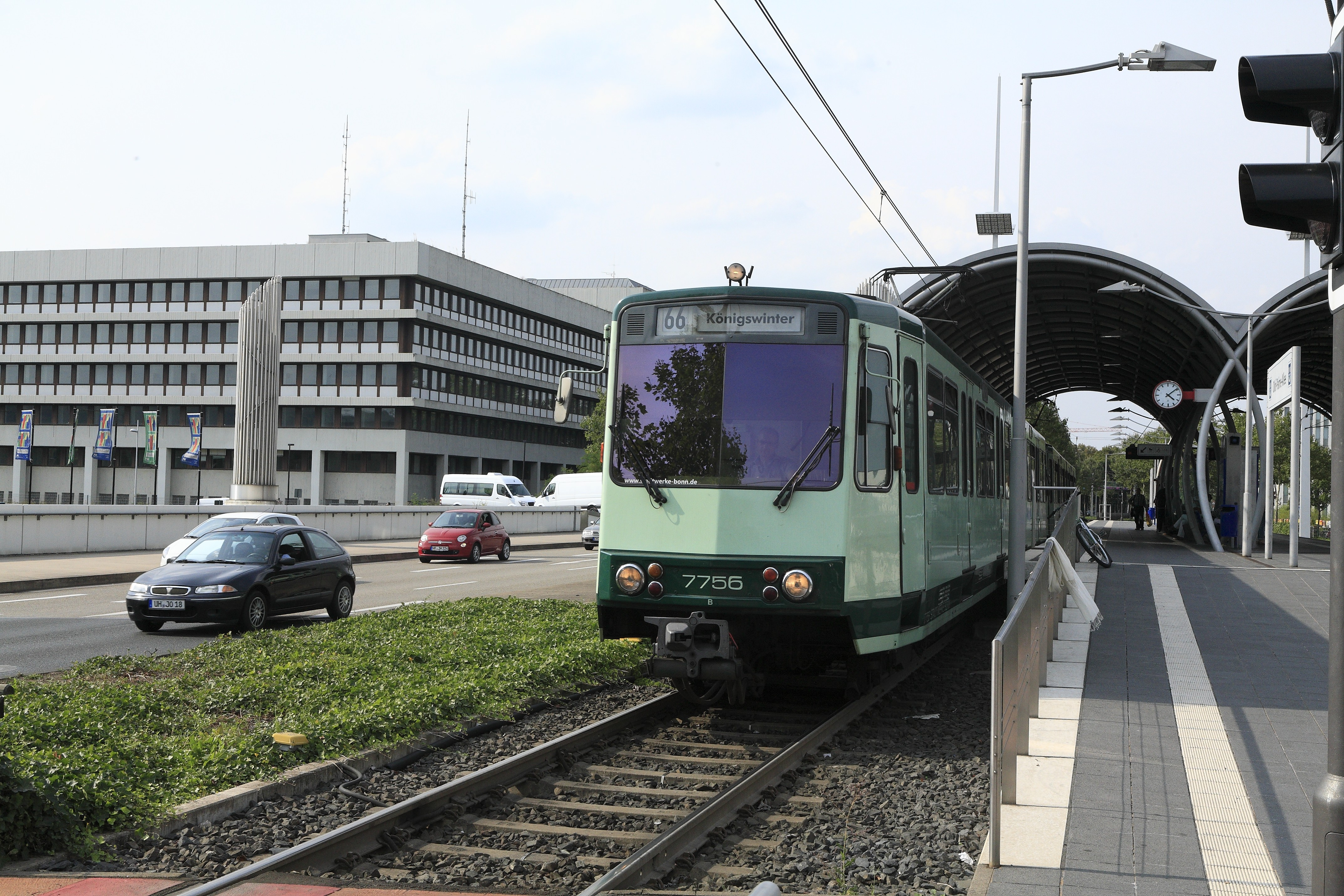
First-generation body

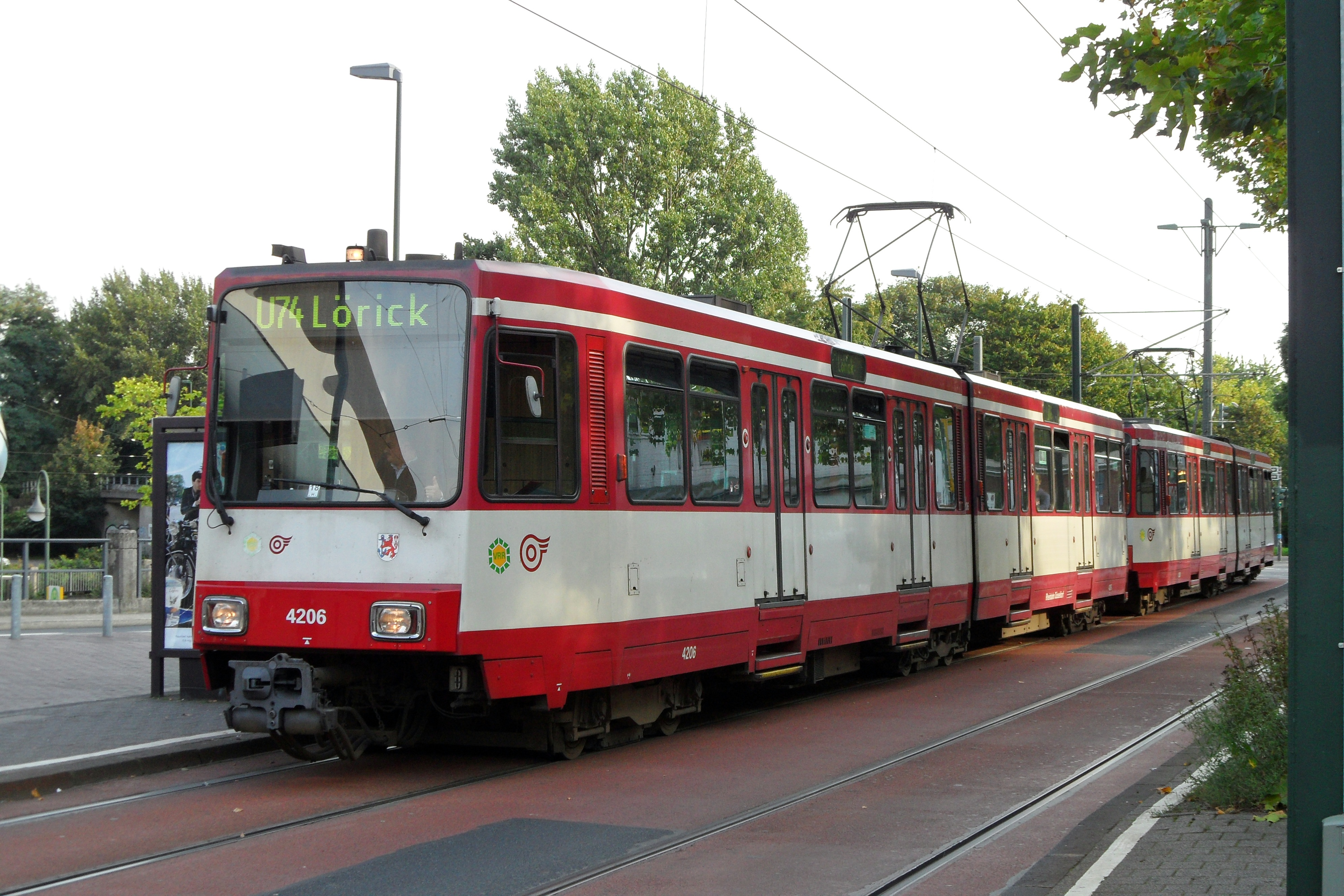
Second-generation body

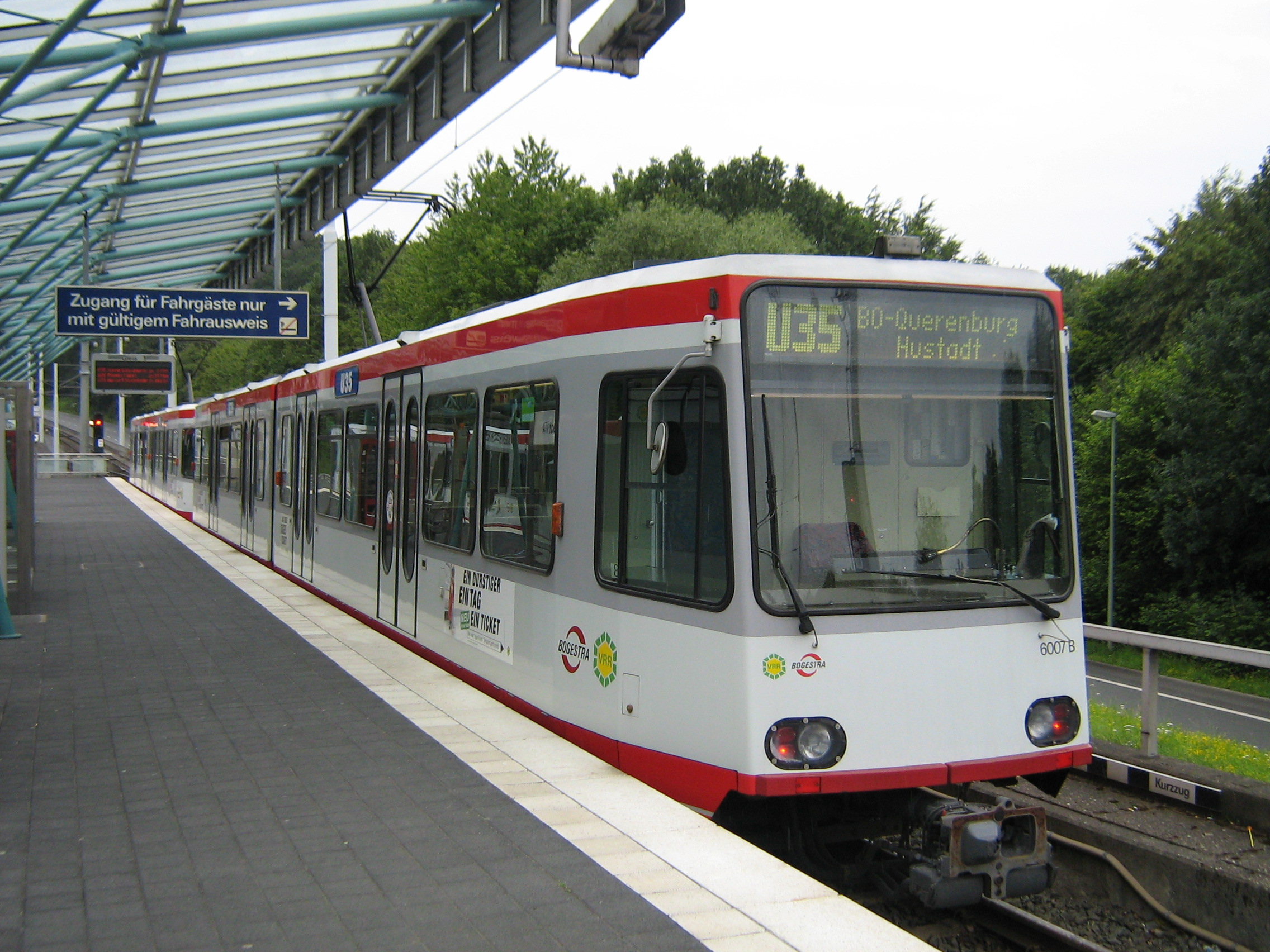
Third-generation body

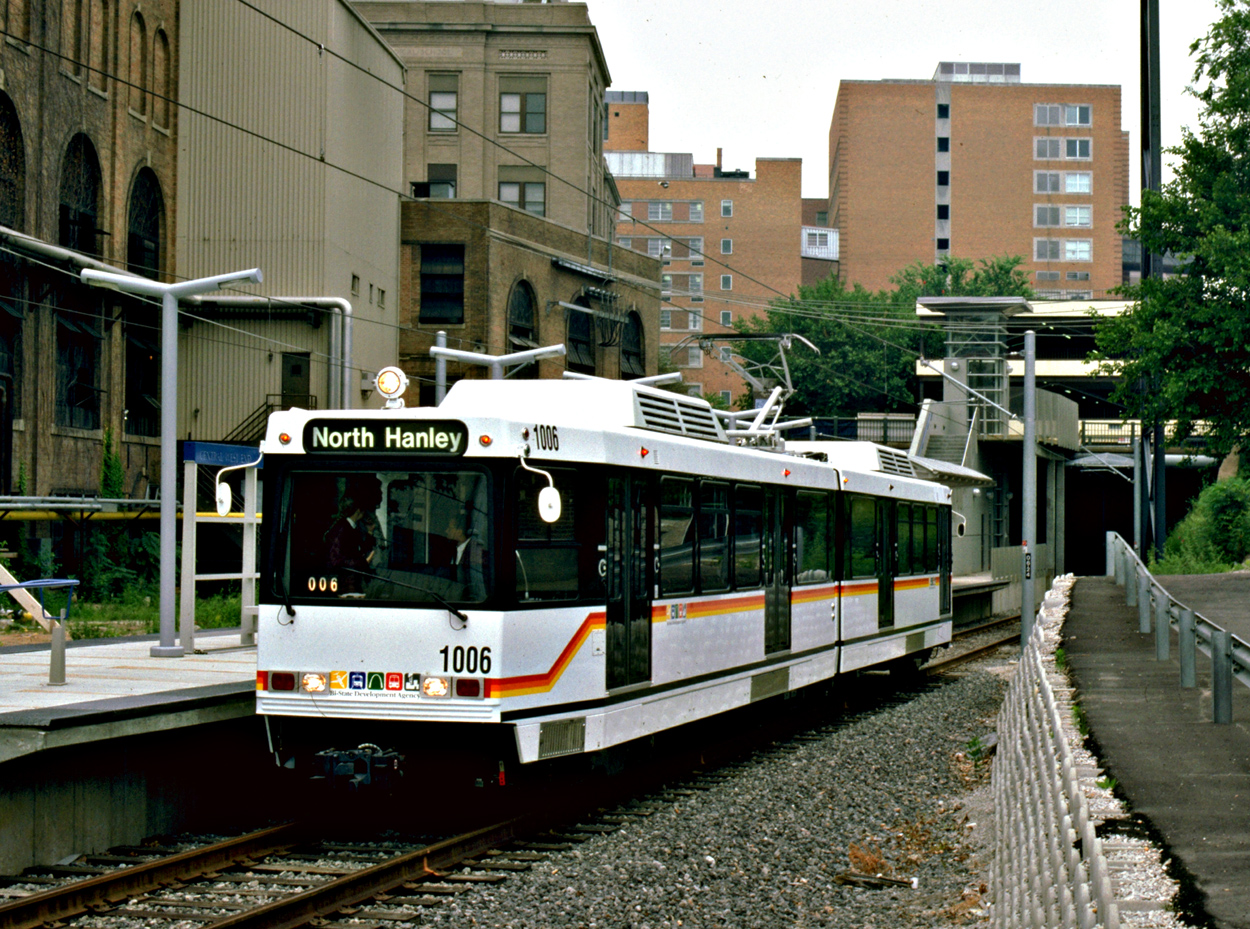
SD-400 body

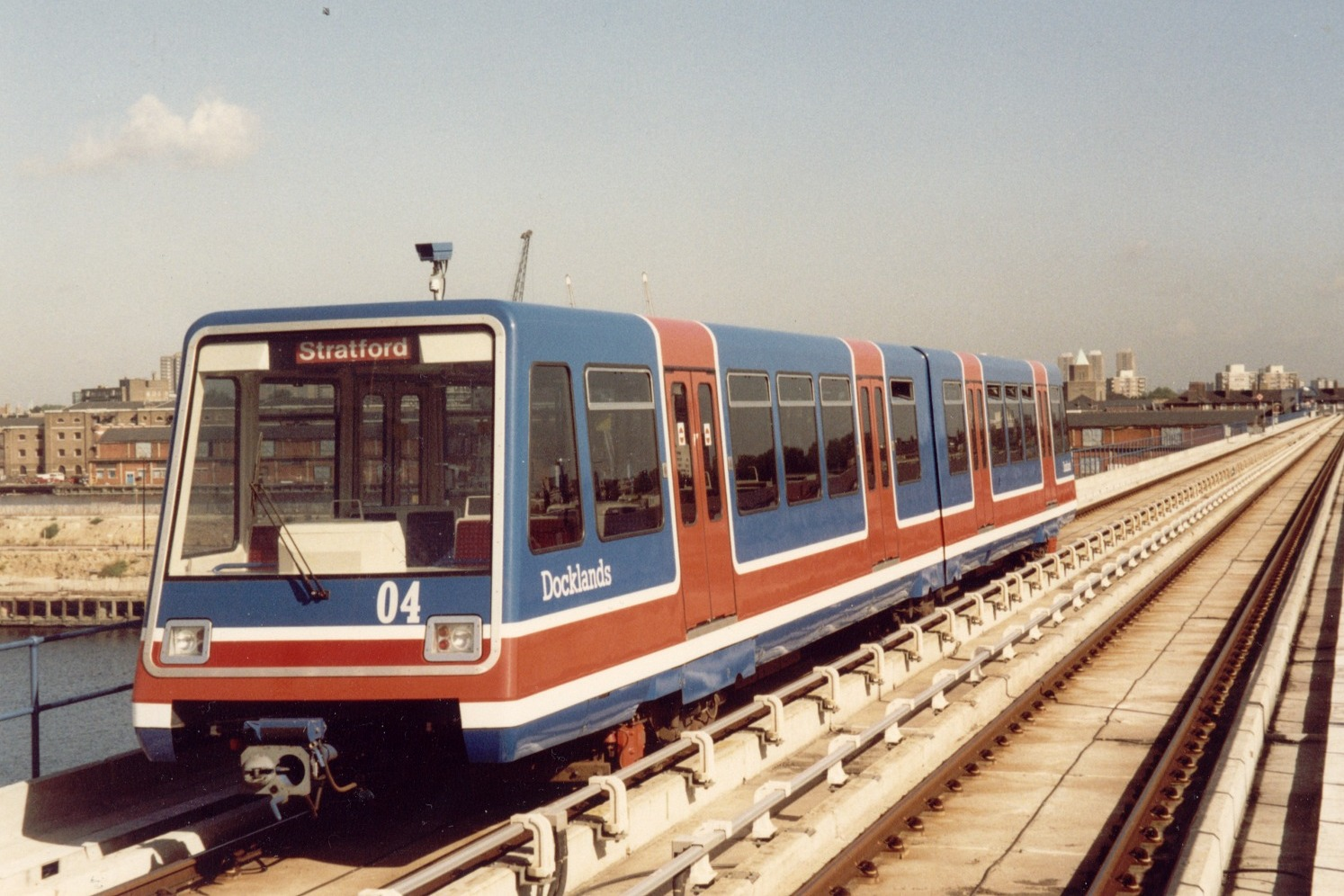
DLR P-86 body
