= Norwich engine shed =

Disused train shed in Norwich, England

Coordinates: 52.624199°N 1.309826°E

Norwich engine shed was located in Norwich, England and was opened in 1843. It closed in 1982 and was replaced by a new modern facility at Crown Point.

== Early history ==
Norwich engine shed was adjacent to the station on the south side of the line. It was established in 1843 by the Yarmouth and Norwich Railway and was built and designed by William Marshall. By 1845 the shed was the centre of locomotive maintenance for the Norfolk Railway. (Note: The Yarmouth and Norwich Railway had become part of the Norfolk Railway by this date.)

By 1848 the site was under the auspices of the Eastern Counties Railway who further developed the site.

The main shed consisted of four through roads one of which dealt with everyday repairs and an adjacent site that dealt with more serious repairs.

== Great Eastern Railway ==
In 1914 the District Locomotive Superintendent was responsible for the shed which at this point employed 260 footplate staff with a further 50 at the various out stations such as Cromer, Mundesley, Sheringham, Dereham, Foulsham and Forncett. The DLS had a running shed foreman and two other foremen who looked after the sheds at Lowestoft and Yarmouth. In addition to the footplate staff there were 120 fitting staff who were under the control of another foreman. These staff were actually located in the adjacent "factory" building where the major repairs were carried out.

Like many GER engine sheds a lot of facilities were very basic. Ash (a waste product from the engines) was dropped directly into an area known as the old yard where it was then shovelled into wagons. In the early days coal was unloaded from wagons onto a wooden stage and then loaded manually into the locomotive's tender. (Note: This structure is described as "a kind of joke seaside pier" by authors Hawkins and Reeve.) It was not until 1915 that the GER supplied a shelter for this work to be carried out but it was not until the 1930s that a mechanised coal plant was supplied.

At the end of 1922 the shed at Norwich had an allocation of 119 locomotives being the fourth biggest shed on the Great Eastern behind Stratford (555) Cambridge (178) and Ipswich (131) sheds. The allocation consisted of:

Class (LNER classification)	Wheel Arrangement	Number allocated
B12	4-6-0	9
D13	4-4-0	4
D14	4-4-0	3
D15	4-4-0	12
E4	2-4-0	27
F3	2-4-2T	13
F4	2-4-2T	2
J14	0-6-0	1
J15	0-6-0	36
J16	0-6-0	1
J17	0-6-0	1
J65	0-6-0T	1
J66	0-6-0T	4
J67	0-6-0T	2
J69	0-6-0T	3

== London and North Eastern Railway ==
Following the grouping Act of 1922 the LNER became responsible for the operation of the shed on 1 January 1923.

A March 1936 LNER Locomotive Committee report notes that there were two turntables at Norwich - one a 55-foot diameter example located at the south end of the shed (by Carrow Road) and the other with a diameter of 49 feet 8 inches being located close to Thorpe station. The report recommended replacement of one of these with a 70-foot turntable and also noted the shed was used by 300 engines each week in summer and 210 in winter.

This bigger turntable was ordered in 1936 and fitted at the Carrow Road site.

Modernization of the facilities in the 1930s saw rationalisation of the works site and general (heavy) repairs ceased in 1934. The facilities of the old factory were still utilised by the engine shed for a number of years however.

== British Railways 1948-1982 ==
The service was coded 32A under British Railways this code being used to indicate which locomotives were allocated there.

A plan of the shed in the 1950s shows:

- Fitting Shop
- Smith and Machine shop
- Engine Rapair shop
- Timber Yard/Store
- Water Softening Plant
- Stores
- Administrative Offices

During the final years of steam, responsibility for the operation of the shed fell to shedmaster Bill Harvey. The shed enjoyed a good reputation for its work on steam locomotives at this time.

When diesel operation started a fuelling point was established on the east side of the line adjacent to Carrow Road bridge (which spans the station throat).

In 1973 the TOPS computer system Norwich's depot code changed to NO then later to NR.

In mid 1975 the DMU allocation at Norwich consisted of Cravens Class 105 two-car units, Gloucester RCW two car units and Metropolitan Cammell two-car and three-car units. The shunter allocation at this time was still exclusively British Rail Class 03.

Before closure Norwich was home to a fleet of Class 03 and Class 08 shunters as well as the local DMU fleet which covered the local services and included examples of Class 105 Cravens Units and Class 101 Metropolitan Cammell units.

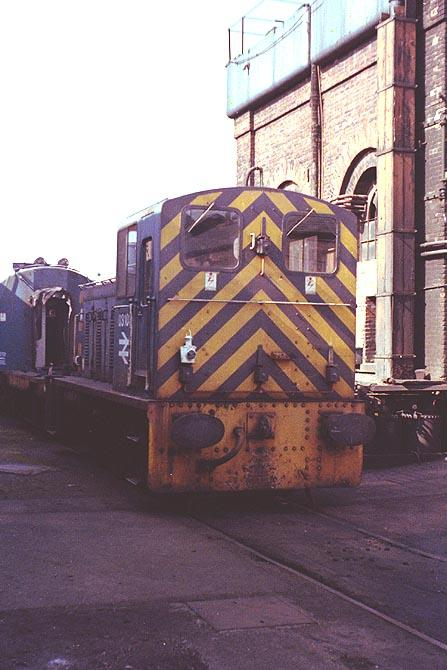
03103 at Norwich depot 10 October 1979

== See also ==
- Norwich railway station
- Crown Point TMD
