= Howdon depot =

Tyne and Wear Metro depot

Howdon Depot
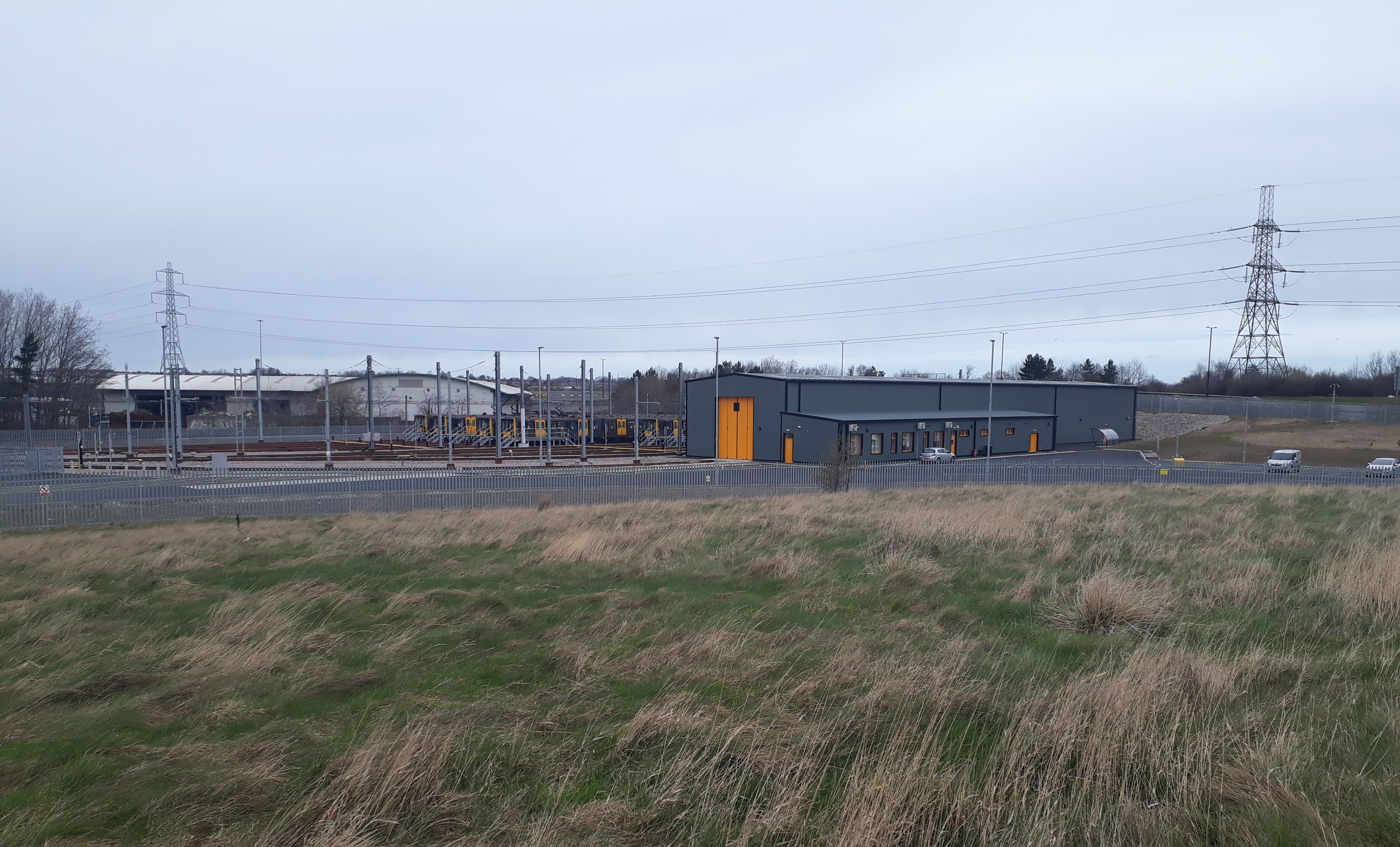

- Location within Tyne and Wear

Location
- Location: Howdon, North Tyneside; England
- Coordinates: 54°59′46″N 1°29′10″W
- OS grid: NZ328669

Characteristics
- Owner: Tyne and Wear PTE
- Operator: Tyne and Wear Metro
- Type: Light rail
- Roads: 11 (10 outside, 1 in shed)
- Rolling stock: Class 555 Metro; Class 599 Metrocar

History
- Opened: October 2020; 6 years ago
- Original: Tyne and Wear Metro

Howdon Depot is a satellite depot used for cleaning, maintenance and stabling of the Tyne and Wear Metro fleet. It is located between the stations Howdon and Percy Main in Howdon, North Tyneside in Tyne and Wear, England. It is equipped with ten storage roads, and features a maintenance shed with a single road and a pit underneath, as well as one shunt road.

== History ==
The depot was constructed on the site of a former landfill, by Buckingham Group Contracting, as a temporary satellite of South Gosforth depot, ahead of refurbishment work commencing. A groundbreaking ceremony took place in June 2019, with the main construction phase commencing in late 2019. Opening was initially expected in July 2020, but this was delayed, with the depot becoming operational in December 2020,

The depot has the capacity to house 25% of the current Metrocar fleet, which allowed for a continuing service whilst the main depot at South Gosforth was upgraded. Construction of the new 12-acre (4.9 ha) South Gosforth depot completed in January 2024.
