= British Rail Class 105 =

Class of diesel multiple units

British Rail Classes 105 and 106
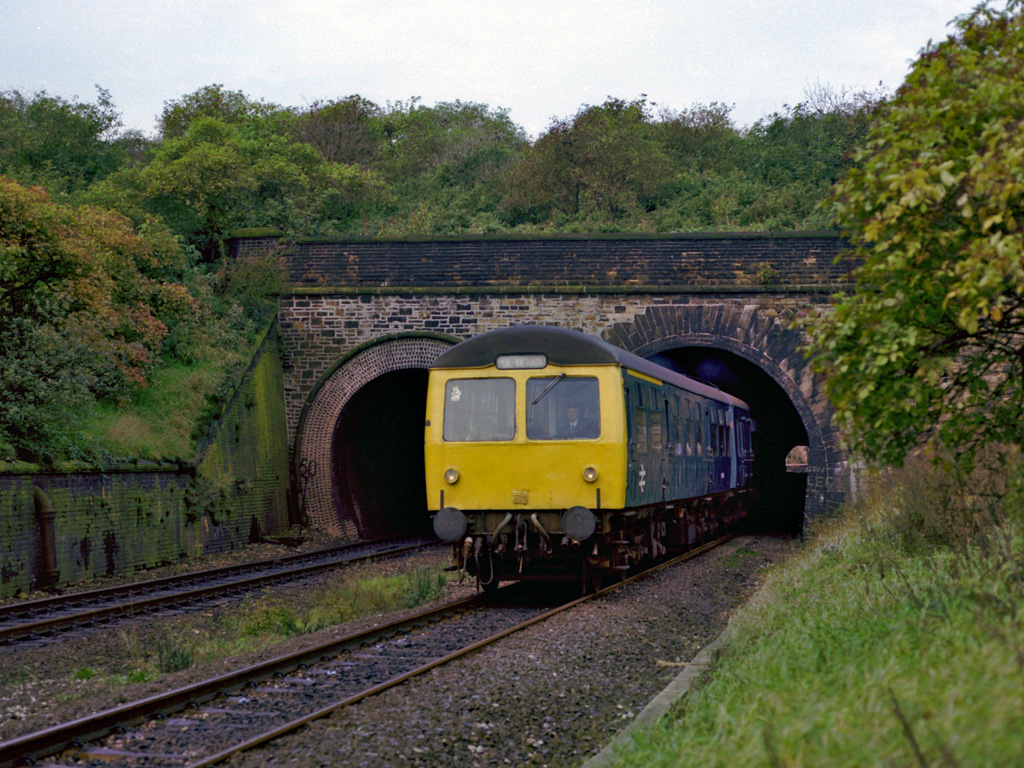
- A Class 105 unit emerges from the tunnel at Farnworth, 1982
- In service: 1959–1988
- Manufacturer: Cravens
- Family name: First generation
- Replaced: Steam locomotives and carriages
- Constructed: 1956–1959
- Number built: DMBS: 142, DTCL: 108, DMCL: 33, TCL 19. Total: 302 cars
- Number preserved: 3 cars
- Successor: Class 313
- Formation: 2-cars sets: DMBS-DTCL or DMBS-DMCL, 3 cars sets:DMBS-TCL-DMCL
- Operator: British Railways
- Depots: BG Hull; BY Bletchley; GF South Gosforth; HT Heaton; NH Newton Heath; NR Norwich; SF Stratford; TS Tyseley

Specifications
- Car body construction: Steel
- Car length: 57 ft 6 in (17.53 m)
- Width: 9 ft 3 in (2.82 m)
- Height: 12 ft 7 in (3.84 m)
- Doors: Slam
- Maximum speed: 70 mph (113 km/h)
- Weight: Power cars: 29.5 or 30.5 tonnes (29.0 or 30.0 long tons); Trailer cars: 23.5 or 24.5 tonnes (23.1 or 24.1 long tons)
- Prime mover: Two BUT
- Power output: 150 bhp (112 kW) each engine
- Transmission: Mechanical: 4 speed epicyclic gearbox
- UIC classification: Power cars: 1A′A1′ Trailer cars: 2′2′
- Coupling system: Screw-link couplings, British Standard gangways
- Multiple working: ■ Blue Square
- Track gauge: 4 ft 8 1/2 in (1,435 mm)

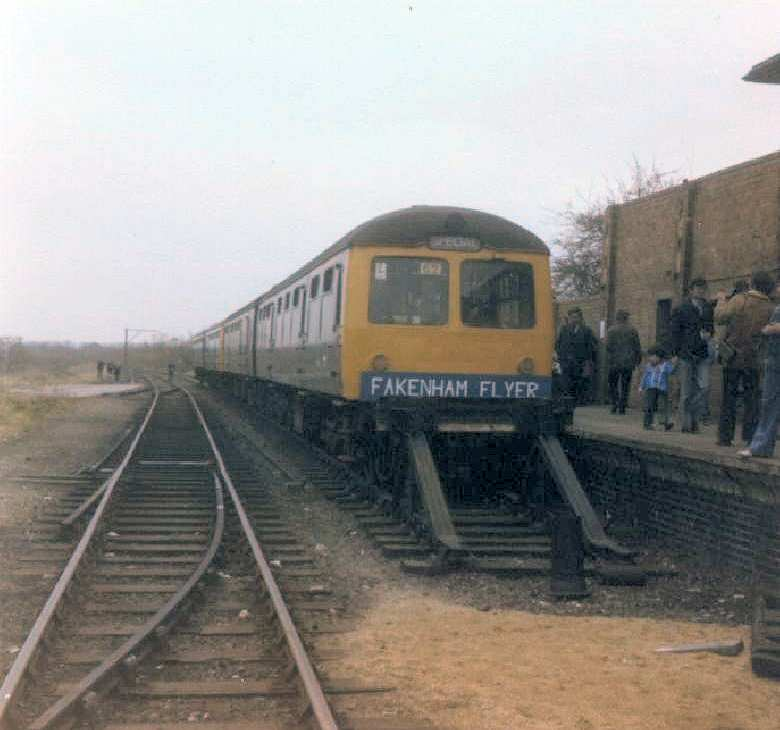
Class 105 set forming a charter at Fakenham East railway station, Norfolk

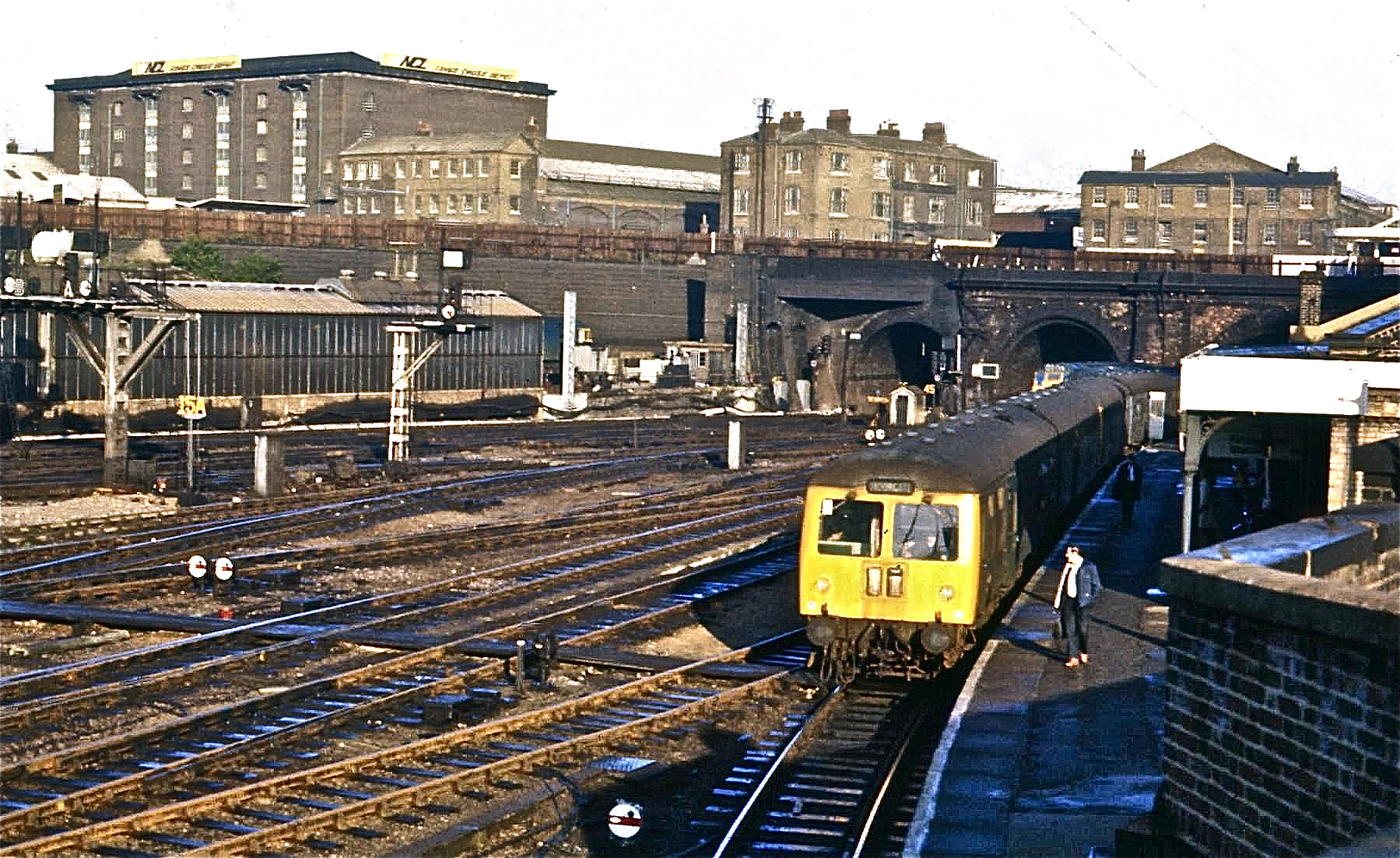
Class 105 at Kings Cross York Rd station on the last day of diesel services to Moorgate in 1976

The British Rail Classes 105 and 106 diesel multiple units were built by Cravens Ltd. of Sheffield from 1956 to 1959. The class were built with a side profile identical to British Railways Mark 1 carriage stock, using the same doors and windows. None were selected for refurbishment. The last passenger car was withdrawn from service in 1988.

Originally AEC engined vehicles were class 105 and Leyland engined vehicles were class 106, but in the late 1970s they all became class 105s.

== Usage ==
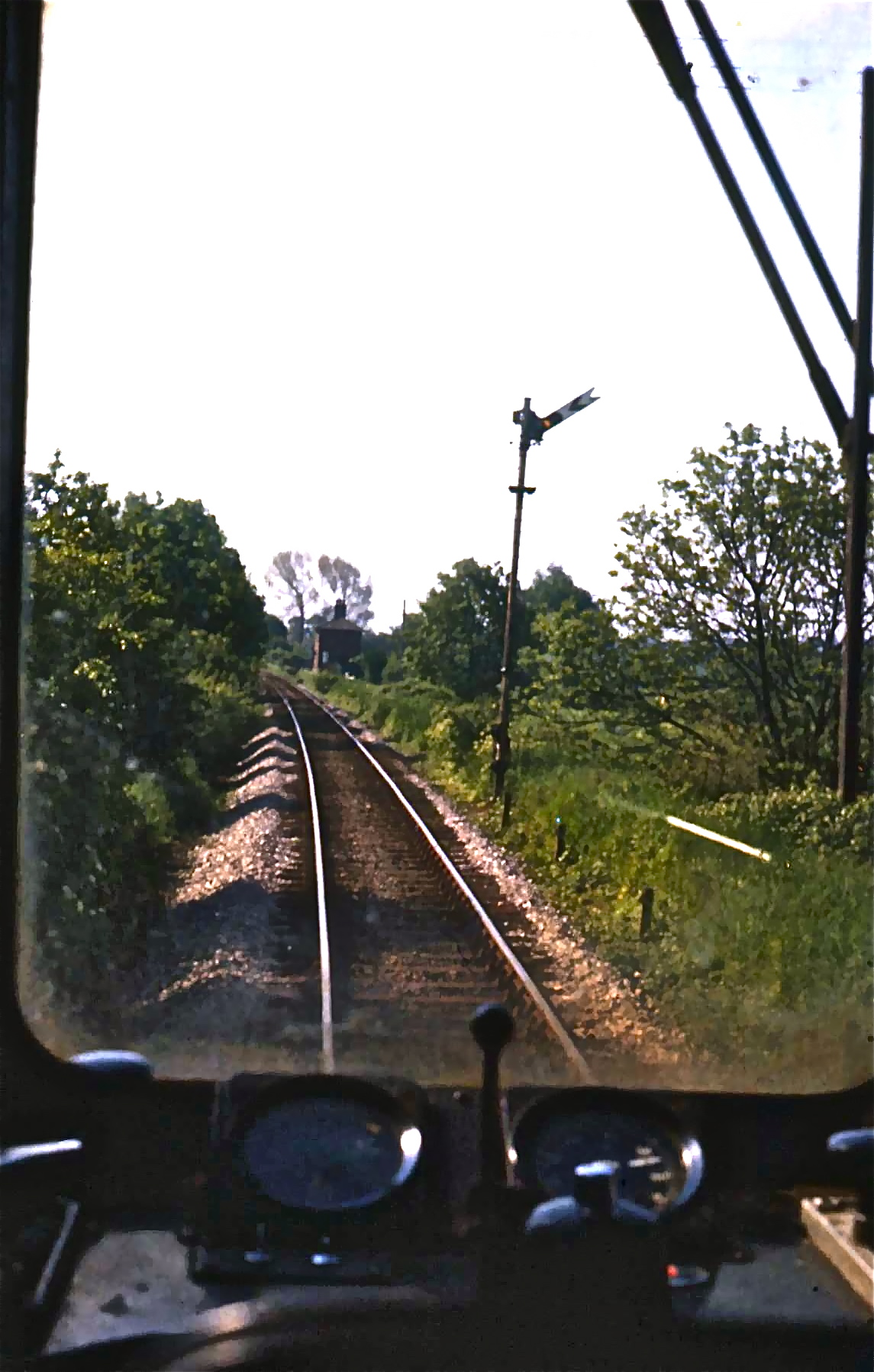
1978 view towards Bures from Class 105 approaching Sudbury

The Class 105 DMUs were used chiefly on Eastern Region services around Hull, Lincolnshire, East Anglia and local services to/from London King's Cross. Units initially designated to work on the former Midland and Great Northern Joint Railway lines were moved to services from London King's Cross upon the closure of the M&GN joint lines in 1959. Units were also used on the London Midland Region and in Scotland, particularly in Aberdeenshire. The closure of many of these lines in the 1960s resulted in their dispersal throughout Great Britain, notably to Tyseley depot in Birmingham. The electrification of the lines from London King's Cross and the introduction of the Class 313 EMUs in 1976 led to the withdrawal of many Cravens units.

Norwich was the last depot to operate the Cravens units, with set 30 being returned to green livery, and gaining some celebrity status towards the end of its service life. The unit was, however, contaminated with asbestos and consequently scrapped.

== Orders ==
Lot No.	Car type	Qty	Fleet numbers	Notes
30280	Driving Motor Brake Second (DMBS)	14	50359–50372	Power-trailer 2-car sets
30281	Driving Trailer Composite with lavatory (DTCL)	14	56114–56127	Power-trailer 2-car sets
30282	Driving Motor Brake Second (DMBS)	17	50373–50389	Power-trailer 2-car sets
30283	Driving Trailer Composite with lavatory (DTCL)	17	56128–56144	Power-trailer 2-car sets
30284	Driving Motor Brake Second (DMBS)	5	50390–50394	Power-trailer 2-car sets
30285	Driving Trailer Composite with lavatory (DTCL)	5	56145–56149	Power-trailer 2-car sets
30352	Driving Motor Brake Second (DMBS)	33	50752–50784	2- or 3-car sets
30353	Driving Motor Composite with lavatory (DMCL)	33	50785–50817	2- or 3-car sets
30354	Trailer Composite with lavatory (TCL)	19	59307–59325	3-car sets
30469	Driving Motor Brake Second (DMBS)	48	51254–51301	Power-trailer 2-car sets
30470	Driving Trailer Composite with lavatory (DTCL)	48	56412–56459	Power-trailer 2-car sets
30503	Driving Motor Brake Second (DMBS)	24	51471–51494	Power-trailer 2-car sets
30504	Driving Trailer Composite with lavatory (DTCL)	24	56460–56483	Power-trailer 2-car sets
30505	Driving Motor Brake Second (DMBS)	1	50249	

== Technical details ==
- Builder: Cravens
- Introduced: 1956
- Coupling Code: Blue Square
- Body: 57 ft 6 in x 9 ft 2 in
- Engines: Two BUT, 150 bhp
- Transmission: Standard mechanical

For coupling codes see British United Traction

== Preservation ==
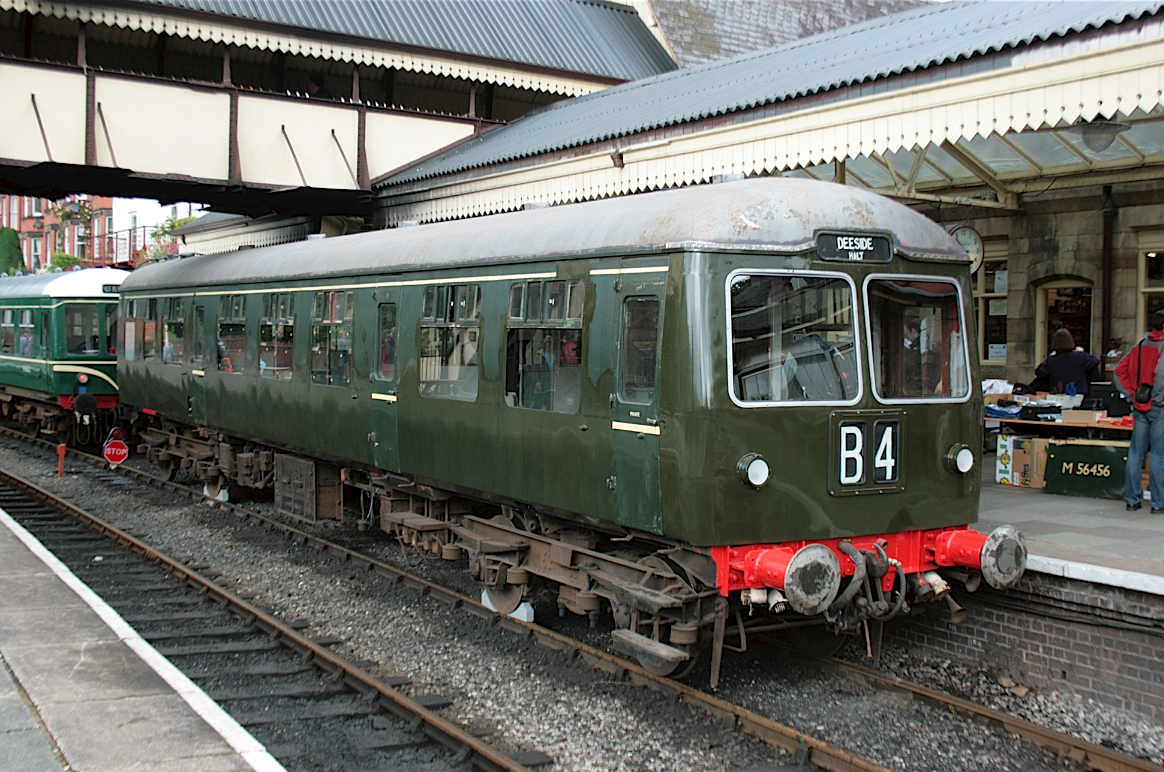
Cravens trailer E56456 at the Llangollen Railway

Due to the use of asbestos in their construction, and extended usage by BR, the class has fared very badly in preservation. 51485 and 56121 were preserved by the West Somerset Railway but moved to the East Lancashire Railway in 1997 where they have been restored after asbestos stripping. 56456 is based on the Llangollen Railway, working initially with a Class 127. The National Railway Museum had intended to preserve 53812, which had been stripped of asbestos, but a lack of space prevented this car and the Class 100 coupled to it from being moved to York and they were vandalised beyond repair at Crewe.

Number	Vehicle type	Location
51485	DMBS	East Lancashire Railway
56121	DTCL	East Lancashire Railway
56456	DTCL	Llangollen Railway

== Models ==
Since 2010, Bachmann has produced 00 scale models of the class 105 in both BR green and BR blue liveries.
