= Track brake =

Brake for rail vehicles

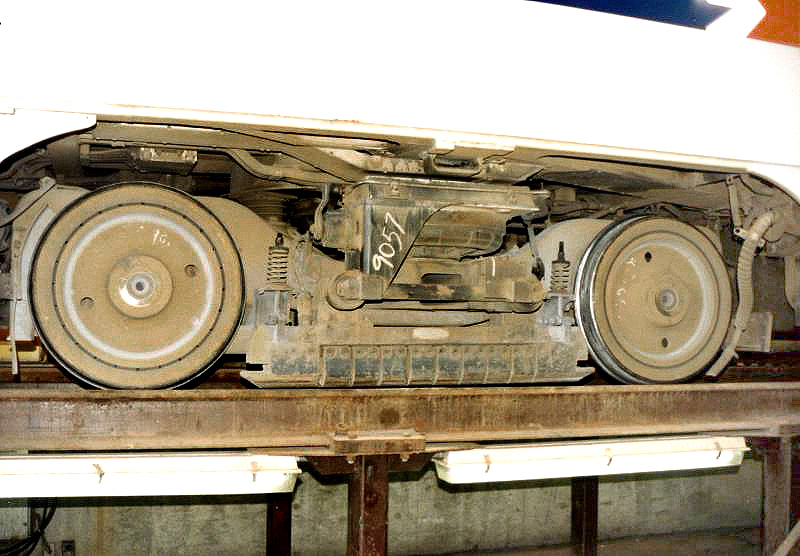
The truck of a SEPTA Kawasaki light rail vehicle showing the track brake magnets between the wheels.

A magnetic track brake (Mg brake) is a brake for rail vehicles. It consists of brake magnets, pole shoes, a suspension, a power transmission and, in the case of mainline railroads, a track rod. When current flows through the magnet coil, the magnet is attracted to the rail, which presses the pole shoes against the rail, thereby decelerating the vehicle.

While brakes such as disc brakes or shoe brakes depend on the frictional connection between wheel and rail, the magnetic track brake acts directly on the rail. Therefore, its brake effect is not limited by wheel-rail contact. Thus, environmental factors such as wetness or contamination of the rail have less influence on the brake force.

== Usage ==
Magnetic track brakes are used on rail vehicles in addition to the primary, wheel-effective brake systems. As an additional brake system, they help to ensure that the prescribed brake distances of rail vehicles can be complied with.

Since magnetic track brakes always act unregulated and at their maximum brake force, they are only used as safety and emergency brakes. They can be used at speeds of up to 280 km/h (170 mph). With the usage of special friction materials they can be used up to speeds of 350 km/h (220 mph).

Due to their track-cleaning effect, magnetic track brakes increase the coefficient of adhesion between the following wheels and the rail during the brake process. This additionally leads to an improvement of the wheel-effective brake systems.

Magnetic track brakes are distincted between rigid and articulated magnets.

== History ==
On April 5, 1900, the patent (AT11554) for the first electromagnetic brake for rail vehicles was registered by the Westinghouse Air Brake Company London. Three years later, the electromagnetic track brake was introduced in Germany by the Westinghouse Company.

The Mg brake was characterized by the fact that the electromagnets were magnetized to different degrees by the exciter coils, which made the brake force dependent on the strength of the brake current. Even the winding numbers of the exciter coils were different in order to be able to regulate the brake force. Thus, the track brake was also equipped with several shoes in order to be able to adapt to possible unevenness of the rails.

In 1905, the first tests were carried out by the Rhine Railway Company. These were track magnets with an attractive force of around 4 kN, which lowered automatically onto the rails when the current was switched on, pressing onto the brake shoes and on the wheels of the cars via a lever rigging. At that time, it had not yet been recognized that track brakes should work independently of the friction between the rail and the wheel.

In 1908, Mr. Jores took over the Westinghouse representation for track brakes in Germany and played a major role in their continuation. After World War I, Jores led the production of his own track brakes after the patent rights had expired. The track brakes were based on drawings taken from Westinghouse. They were manufactured until 1929 without any major changes. The main feature of the track brake at that time were the rail shoes, which were made of a special rolled section.

In 1920, the Magnetic Brake Company, headed by Mr. M. Müller, entered the market with track brakes. Müller attempted to improve the track brake with new designs. For example, he replaced the profiled shoe with a pole shoe made of commercially available flat iron. Until then, track brakes had only been used for streetcars and thus for speeds of up to 40 km/h (25 mph).

At the beginning of 1930, the German Imperial Railways initiated a high-speed rail project that envisaged speeds of up to 160 km/h (99 mph) and was to be of great significance for the track brake.

In 1931, Jores´ company was bought by Knorr-Bremse AG, and the technical director Müller from the Magnetic Brake Company was convinced to join the company. For the first time, the track brake for fast-moving vehicles was developed within the Knorr-Bremse company. In cooperation with the German Imperial Railways, the first tests were carried out with the "Flying Hamburgian". For braking, special brake pads with linings made of synthetic friction materials were used, which acted on brake drums and were attached to the wheel spiders. There was also an electromagnetic track brake available, which however was only to be used as an additional emergency brake.

It became apparent that the pole shoe commonly used up to then was no longer able to cope with the demands of the high speed and the associated high level of heating. Hence the pole shoes were first slit, then divided and made from individual segments. This increased brake performance by 20%. The coil was now fixed to the core and then inserted into the box from the end face together with the core. The coil box was tightly screwed between the core and the webs of the magnet coil, making loosening impossible. The further development of the track brake now appeared to have been completed for the time being.

The coefficient of friction between the rail shoe and the rail is dependent on the speed, i.e. with increasing speed, the coefficient of friction decreases. As the project "speed up to 350 km/h" became official, it appeared as if the track brake could no longer be of use for this purpose.

It was not until passenger train speeds exceeded 140 km/h (87 mph) and a friction-independent brake system became necessary that the plans for the track brake were brought out again and the design improved. To improve the contact surfaces with the rail, articulated magnets were developed and patented. The magnetic brakes are only enabled over 50 km/h for emergency braking, and they keep stuck to the rail even after that minimal speed has been undershot, so that they keep being partially active until shortly before a full stop when they lift up automatically.

== Active principle and functionality ==
The main component of the magnetic track brake is the brake magnet. Following the principle of an electromagnet, it consists of a coil wound around an iron core, which is enclosed by horseshoe-shaped magnets.

Direct current is passed through this magnet coil, generating a magnetic field. This causes an attractive force between the brake magnet with the pole shoes attached to it and the rail. The pole shoes are pressed onto the rail, and the resulting friction converts the kinetic energy of the movement into heat (dissipation) until the kinetic energy is consumed or the brake is deactivated.

Magnetic track brakes must also work safely in the event of a contact line failure. The braking system must therefore be designed in such a way that, in the event of a power failure, a supply from the vehicle's batteries is guaranteed at all times.

== Rigid magnets ==
Rigid magnets contain a single steel core running the entire length of the magnet body, with pole shoes located on the underside as wear parts.

Rigid magnets are typically used for streetcars, where they are usually suspended in a low position.

=== Suspension ===
The suspension is responsible for holding the switched-off magnet above the rail. In the event of braking, the magnet automatically attracts itself to the rails against the effect of the suspension springs. After switching off, the springs of the suspension pull the magnet back into the readiness position.

=== Driver ===
The drivers are responsible for the transmission of the brake force from the magnet to the bogie. It takes place via tie bars or driver towers.

Tie bars are attached to the front and rear ends of the brake magnet respectively. They are the preferred and most effective way of transmitting brake force.

If there is not enough space in front of or behind the brake magnet to mount the drivers, they are mounted on top of the magnet. These are referred to as driver towers. This type of driver should only be used in exceptional cases.

=== Pole shoes ===
The pole shoes are located on the underside of the brake magnet. Between the two pole shoes, a non-magnetic strip ensures that a magnetic short circuit does not occur.

The friction material of the rail shoes can be made of different materials, each of which determines the service life and brake performance of the rail shoes.

== Articulated magnets ==
Articulated magnets have magnetic cores that are divided into two end pieces and several intermediate links separated by partitions. While the end pieces are tightly screwed together with the coil body, the intermediate elements can move freely in the openings of the coil case. Thus, they can adapt themselves better to unevenness of the rails during the brake process.

=== Track rods ===
The track rods are used to keep the brake magnets at a distance. They also ensure their parallelism and stability. Together with the two brake magnets, the track rods form the so-called brake frame. Track rods must be individually adapted for each vehicle model.

=== Actuating cylinders ===
The actuating cylinders are located on top of the brake square. They are responsible for lowering the brake frame onto the rails and raising it again.

Built-in springs hold the brake frame in the high position when the brakes are not applied. When the brakes are applied, the brake frame is pneumatically lowered onto the rails against the force of the springs. The compressed air supply required for this is provided by a separate compressed air reservoir. This ensures that the brake system is still working even if the vehicles brake pipe fails. When the brakes are released, the springs in the actuating cylinders lift the brake frame back into the high position.

=== Centering device ===
In the deactivated state, the magnets are de-energized and the brake square is brought into the high position. In this case, the centering device ensures that the brake square is centered and fixed in its position. While braking, the brake magnets are activated and center themselves on the rails by the magnetic force.

=== Drivers ===
Also with articulated magnets, drivers ensure that the brake force is transmitted from the brake magnets to the vehicle. They are located in all four corners on the inside of the brake frame.

=== Buffer switch ===
If required, a buffer switch can be mounted on the brake frame. It signals when the brake frame leaves its high position and thus provides information on the status of the track brake.

== Friction material ==
The pole shoes in magnetic track brakes can be made of different materials. These differ primarily in their magnetic properties, brake force coefficient, and wear.

=== Steel ===
Steel is the standard friction material for track brakes. The wear of steel pole shoes is low, but they form weldings which have to be knocked off regularly.

=== Sinter ===
Pole shoes made of sinter offer increased brake performance and do not form weldings, but their wear is higher. Sinter is used in cases where brake force is critical. It is currently used, for example, by Vy in Norway.

=== Cast ===
Pole shoes made of cast iron are only used in mainline. They have reduced brake force and increased wear, but do not form weldings. In France, cast iron is the standard friction material used for magnetic track brakes.

== Areas of application ==
Magnetic track brakes are installed in many rail vehicles. Only high-speed trains use eddy current brakes instead of magnetic track brakes for technical reasons. Heavy rail vehicles in the UK do not typically used magnetic track brakes as they can interfere with signalling systems.

Rigid magnets are usually suspended in low suspension and are used on streetcars. In special cases, the use of track rods is possible.

Articulated magnets are usually suspended in high position and are used in mainline railroads. However, they can also be used in low suspension, for example in subways.

== See also ==
- Eddy current brake
- Brake run for information on skid brakes and magnetic brakes.
