= Coxlodge railway station =

Disused railway station in Tyne and Wear on the Ponteland Railway

Coxlodge

General information
- Location: Coxlodge, Newcastle upon Tyne; England
- Coordinates: 55.0135°N 1.6446°W
- Grid reference: NZ228688
- Platforms: 1

Other information
- Status: Disused

History
- Original company: North Eastern Railway
- Pre-grouping: North Eastern Railway
- Post-grouping: London and North Eastern Railway

Key dates
- 1 June 1905: Opened
- 17 June 1929: Closed to passengers
- 29 November 1965: Closed to freight

Coxlodge was a railway station on the Ponteland Railway, which ran between South Gosforth and Ponteland, with a sub-branch line to Darras Hall. The station served Coxlodge and Fawdon in Newcastle upon Tyne. It was opened in 1905, closed to passengers in 1929, and to goods traffic in 1965.

The station was situated at the junction of Edgefield Avenue, Fawdon Walk and The Meadows. Today the site is occupied by the western (eastbound) platform of Fawdon station on the Tyne and Wear Metro.

== History ==
The Gosforth and Ponteland Light Railway was formed in 1899, under the Light Railways Act 1896 (59 & 60 Vict. c. 48), and construction of the line, by the North Eastern Railway, was authorised by Parliament in February 1901. In March 1905, the 7-mile section from South Gosforth to Ponteland was opened to goods traffic, with passenger services commencing in June 1905.

Coxlodge station was opened on 1 June 1905. The ticket selling statistics in 1911 showed that this was the least popular station on the branch line. In 1922, the branch line was served by six weekday passenger trains, with an additional train running on Saturday. Only three trains ran through to Darras Hall.

As a result of poor passenger numbers, the station, along with the branch line closed to passengers on 17 June 1929. The station remained open for goods traffic, before closing altogether on 29 November 1965. The line through the station remained open, to serve sidings at the ICI Callerton explosives depot, situated between Callerton and Ponteland, and Rowntree's Fawdon factory, just west of Coxlodge.

In May 1981, the line between South Gosforth and Bank Foot was rebuilt to become part of the Tyne and Wear Metro network. Freight traffic to and from Rowntree's factory and ICI Callerton continued to share the line with the metro until they closed in July 1988 and March 1989 respectively. The Metro line was later extended from Bank Foot to Newcastle Airport in November 1991. The western (eastbound) platform of current Fawdon Metro station is situated on the site of the former station of Coxlodge.

Preceding station	Historical railways	Following station
Kenton Bank	North Eastern Railway; Ponteland Railway	West Gosforth
