= West Gosforth railway station =

Disused railway station in Tyne and Wear on the Ponteland Railway

West Gosforth

General information
- Location: Gosforth, Newcastle upon Tyne; England
- Coordinates: 55.0114°N 1.6215°W
- Grid reference: NZ243686
- Platforms: 2

Other information
- Status: Disused

History
- Original company: North Eastern Railway
- Pre-grouping: North Eastern Railway
- Post-grouping: London and North Eastern Railway

Key dates
- 1 June 1905: Opened
- 17 June 1929: Closed to passengers
- 14 August 1967: Closed to freight

West Gosforth was a railway station on the Ponteland Railway, which ran between South Gosforth and Ponteland, with a sub-branch line to Darras Hall. The station served Gosforth in Newcastle upon Tyne. It was opened in 1905, closed to passengers in 1929, and to goods traffic in 1967.

The station was situated near to the junction of the Great North Road (B1318) and Hollywood Avenue. The station site is now occupied by the Regent Centre Interchange on the Tyne and Wear Metro.

== History ==
The Gosforth and Ponteland Light Railway was formed in 1899, under the Light Railways Act 1896 (59 & 60 Vict. c. 48), and construction of the line, by the North Eastern Railway, was authorised by Parliament in February 1901. In March 1905, the 7-mile section from South Gosforth to Ponteland was opened to goods traffic, with passenger services commencing in June 1905.

West Gosforth station was opened on 1 June 1905. It consisted of two side platforms, and had simple pitched roof station building and a signal box on the down platform, with access to a small goods shed at the back of the same platform. In 1922, the branch line was served by six weekday passenger trains, with an additional train running on Saturday. Only three trains ran through to Darras Hall.

As a result of poor passenger numbers, the station, along with the branch line closed to passengers on 17 June 1929. It remained open for goods traffic, although the station at West Gosforth was downgraded to a public delivery siding on 23 August 1954, before closing altogether on 14 August 1967. The line through the station remained open, to serve sidings at the ICI Callerton explosives depot, situated between Callerton and Ponteland, and Rowntree's Fawdon factory, just west of Coxlodge.

In May 1981, the line between South Gosforth and Bank Foot was rebuilt to become part of the Tyne and Wear Metro network. Freight traffic to and from Rowntree's factory and ICI Callerton continued to share the line with the metro until they closed in July 1988 and March 1989 respectively. The Metro line was later extended from Bank Foot to Newcastle Airport in November 1991. The current station at Regent Centre is situated on the site of the former station of West Gosforth.

Preceding station	Historical railways	Following station
Coxlodge	North Eastern Railway; Ponteland Railway	South Gosforth
