= Fawdon Metro station =

Tyne and Wear Metro station in Newcastle upon Tyne

Fawdon
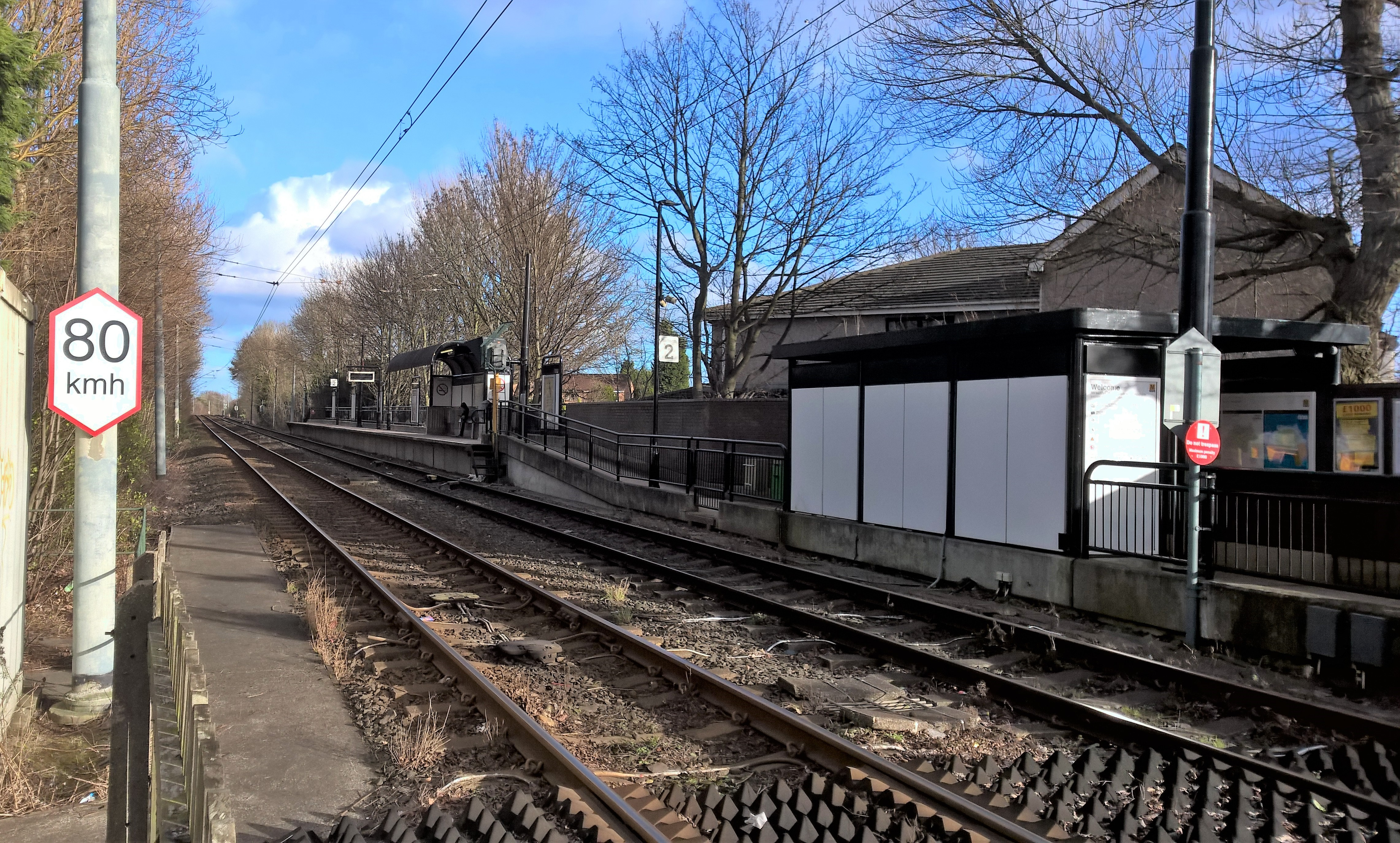
- The westbound platform is seen, looking east from the level crossing

General information
- Location: Fawdon Lane, Fawdon, NE3; Newcastle upon Tyne; England
- Coordinates: 55.0132°N 1.6450°W
- OS Grid ref: NZ 228 688
- Elevation: 64 m (210 ft)
- System: Tyne and Wear Metro
- Owner: Nexus
- Line: Green line
- Platforms: 2
- Tracks: 2

Construction
- Structure type: Surface-level
- Parking: 21 spaces
- Cycle facilities: 3 cycle pods, with space for 6 bikes
- Accessible: Step-free access throughout, with level-boarding to trains

Other information
- Station code: FAW
- Fare zone: B

History
- Original company: Tyne and Wear Metro

Key dates
- 10 May 1981: Opened

Passengers
- 2020/21: ▼138,986
- 2021/22: ▲553,959
- 2022/23: ▲645,200
- 2023/24: ▲761,025
- 2024/25: ▼745,585

Services
Preceding station	Tyne and Wear Metro	Following station
Wansbeck Road towards South Hylton	Green line	Kingston Park towards Airport
Location
- Location within Newcastle-upon-Tyne Location within Tyne and Wear
Notes
- Metro passenger statistics from Nexus.

Fawdon is a Tyne and Wear Metro station, serving the suburbs of Fawdon, Coxlodge and Kenton in the English city of Newcastle upon Tyne. It was opened in 1981, adjacent to the level crossing carrying Fawdon Lane across the railway and with staggered platforms on either side of the level crossing.

== History ==
The station is located on the route of the former Gosforth and Ponteland Light Railway, which opened on 1 May 1905. Coxlodge station, which opened three months later with the introduction of passenger services on the line, was situated where the metro station's western (eastbound) platform is today. The line closed to passengers in June 1929, but remained open for freight traffic, including to and from the ICI Callerton explosives depot, situated between Callerton and Ponteland, and Rowntree's Fawdon factory, just west of Fawdon.

In the late 1970s the line through the site was restructured to form the second phase of the Tyne and Wear Metro, between South Gosforth and Bank Foot. This opened on 10 May 1981, along with the new Fawdon station. Freight traffic to and from Rowntree's factory and ICI Callerton continued to pass through the station until they closed in July 1988 and March 1989 respectively. In 1991 the Metro line was extended from Bank Foot to Newcastle Airport.

In 2018, the station, along with others on the Airport branch, were refurbished as part of the Metro: All Change programme. The project saw improvements to accessibility, security and energy efficiency, as well as the re-branding of the station to the new black and white corporate colour scheme.

The Metro station was used by 745,585 passengers in 2024/25, almost identical to the pre-pandemic figure of 745,332 in 2018/19.

== Facilities ==
Fawdon has two side platforms, which are staggered on opposite sides of the level crossing on Fawdon Lane. The eastbound platform lies to the west of the level crossing, with the westbound platform to the east. There are separate ramped accesses to the two platforms from Fawdon Lane, whilst the eastbound platform can also be accessed by the car park off Fawdon Park Road. The car park is free and has 21 spaces, plus two accessible spaces. There is also provision for cycle parking, with three cycle pods available.

The station is equipped with ticket machines, waiting shelter, seating, next train information displays, timetable posters, and an emergency help point on both platforms. Ticket machines are able to accept payment with credit and debit card (including contactless payment), notes and coins. The station is also fitted with smartcard validators, which feature at all stations across the network.

== Services ==
As of June 2026, the station is served by up to five trains per hour – in each direction – on weekdays and Saturday, and up to four trains per hour during the evening and on Sunday. In the southbound direction, trains run to South Hylton (Note: Prior to 12 December 2005, Green line services operated between South Shields and Newcastle Airport.) via Central Station and Sunderland. In the northbound direction, trains run to Newcastle Airport.
