= Wansbeck Road Metro station =

Tyne and Wear Metro station in Newcastle upon Tyne

Wansbeck Road
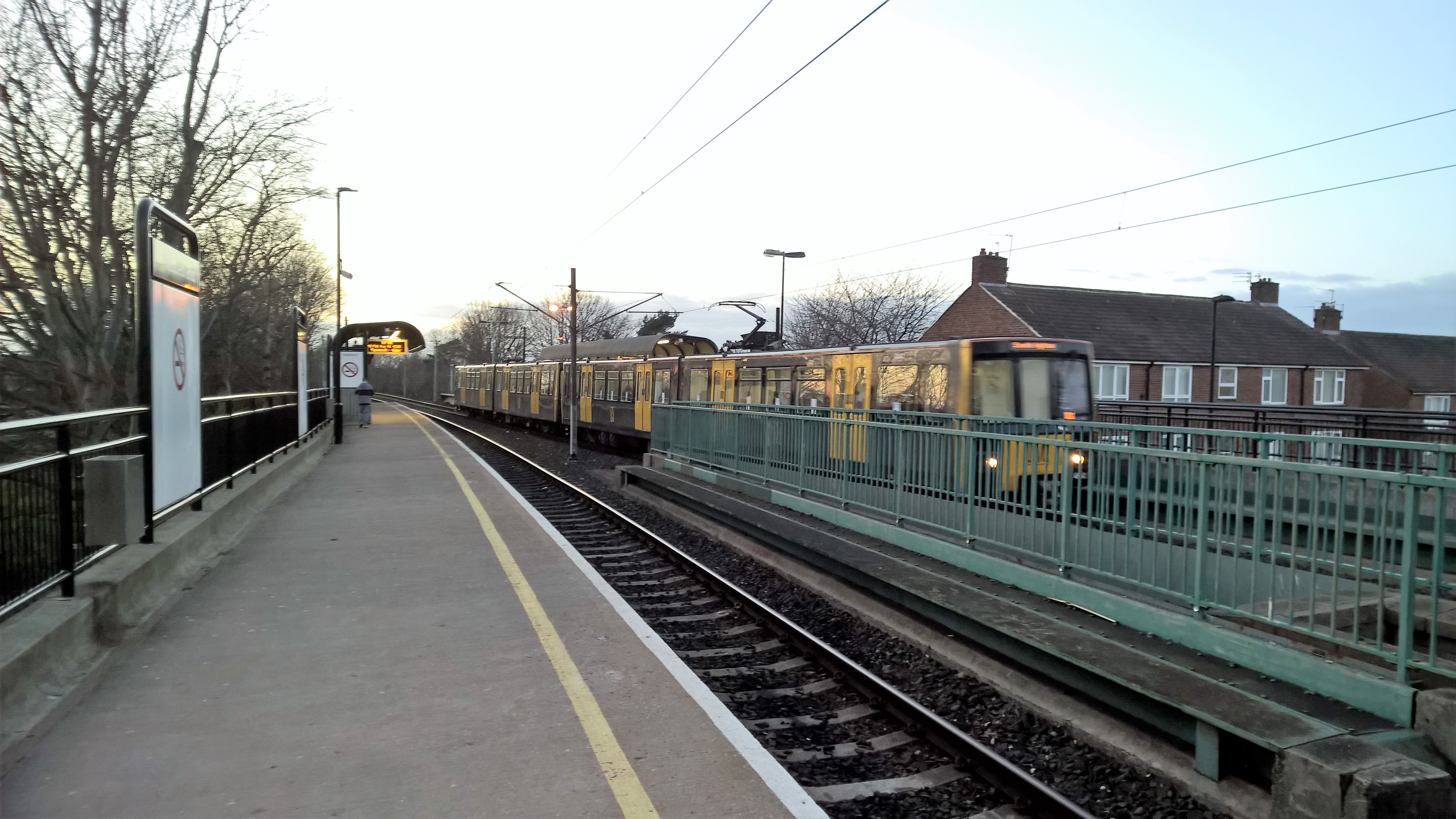

General information
- Location: Wansbeck Road, West Gosforth, NE3; Newcastle upon Tyne; England
- Coordinates: 55.0143°N 1.6357°W
- OS Grid ref: NZ 234 689
- System: Tyne and Wear Metro
- Owner: Nexus
- Line: Green line
- Platforms: 2
- Tracks: 2

Construction
- Cycle facilities: 3 cycle pods, with space for 6 bikes
- Accessible: Step-free access throughout, with level-boarding to trains

Other information
- Station code: WBR
- Fare zone: B

History
- Original company: Tyne and Wear Metro

Key dates
- 10 May 1981: Opened

Passengers
- 2020/21: ▼59,583
- 2021/22: ▲203,897
- 2022/23: ▲285,663
- 2023/24: ▲307,646
- 2024/25: ▲311,687

Services
| Preceding station | Tyne and Wear Metro | Following station |
|---|---|---|
| Regent Centre towards South Hylton | Green line | Fawdon towards Airport |
Location
- Location within Newcastle-upon-Tyne Location within Tyne and Wear
Notes
- Metro passenger statistics from Nexus.

Wansbeck Road is a Tyne and Wear Metro station, serving the suburbs of Coxlodge and West Gosforth in the English city of Newcastle upon Tyne. It opened in 1981 and is situated next to, and partly over, the bridge carrying the metro line over the Wansbeck Road.

== History ==
The station is located on the route of the former Gosforth and Ponteland Light Railway, which opened on 1 March 1905, with passenger services commencing three months later, but which never included a station at Wansbeck Road. The line through the site closed to passengers on 17 June 1929, but remained open to serve freight, latterly to the ICI Callerton explosives depot and Rowntree's Fawdon factory.

In the late 1970s the line through the site was restructured to form the second phase of the Tyne and Wear Metro, between South Gosforth and Bank Foot. This opened on 10 May 1981, and included the new station at Wansbeck Road, which was built on an embankment. A second concrete span was added to the original single-track bridge during the construction. The embankment and restricted working areas made it one of the more challenging stations to construct on the Metro system at the time.

Freight traffic to and from Rowntree's factory and ICI Callerton continued to pass through the station until they closed in July 1988 and March 1989 respectively. In 1991 the Metro line was extended from Bank Foot to Newcastle Airport.

In 2018, the station, along with others on the branch between South Gosforth and Newcastle Airport, was refurbished. The £300,000 project saw improvements to accessibility, security and energy efficiency, as well as the rebranding of the station to the new black and white corporate colour scheme.

The Metro station was used by 311,687 passengers in 2024/25, considerably lower than the pre-pandemic figure of 406,609 in 2018/19.

== Facilities ==
The station has two side platforms, on a bridge and embankment above Wansbeck Road, with separate entrances to each platform. Access to the westbound platform is by ramp or stairs from the east side of Wansbeck Road. Access to the eastbound platform is by ramp or stairs from the west side of Wansbeck Road, or by stairs only from the east side. There is no car parking at the station, but there is cycle storage, with three cycle pods.

Both platforms have ticket machines (which accept cash, card and contactless payment), smartcard validators, sheltered waiting area, seating, next train audio and visual displays, timetable and information posters and an emergency help point.

== Services ==
As of June 2026, the station is served by up to five trains per hour – in each direction – on weekdays and Saturday, and up to four trains per hour during the evening and on Sunday. In the southbound direction, trains run to South Hylton (Note: Prior to 12 December 2005, Green line services operated between South Shields and Newcastle Airport.) via Central Station and Sunderland. In the northbound direction, trains run to Newcastle Airport.
