= Kenton Bank railway station =

Disused railway station in Tyne and Wear on the Ponteland Railway

Kenton Bank
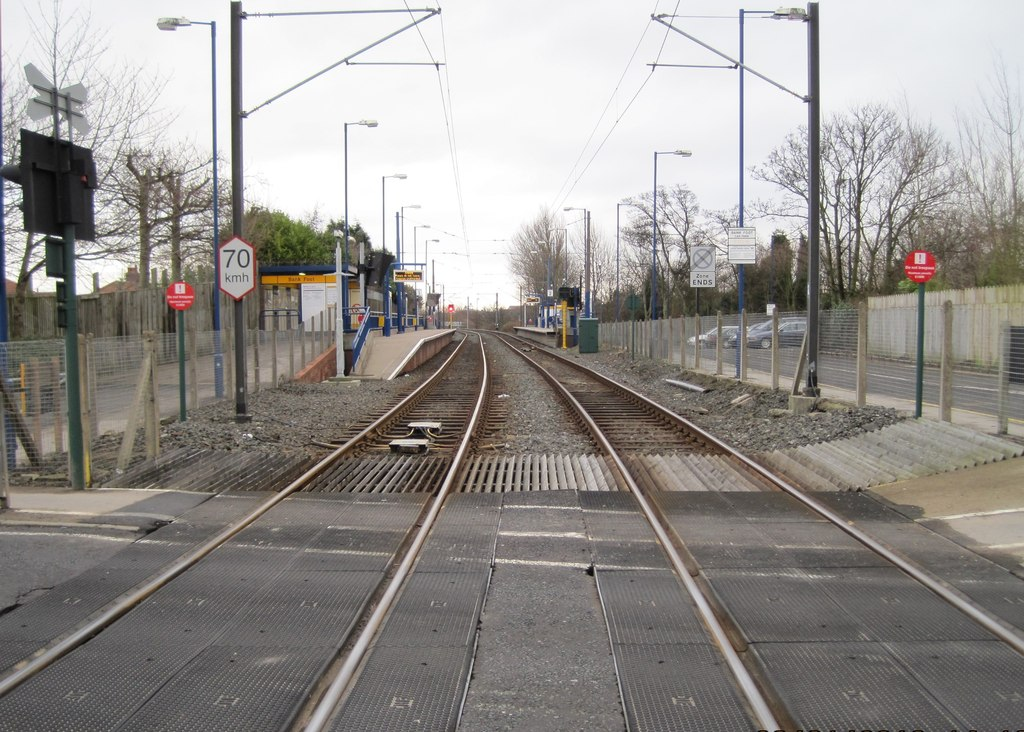
- The site of the station in 2010

General information
- Location: Kenton, Newcastle upon Tyne; England
- Coordinates: 55.0142°N 1.6793°W
- Grid reference: NZ206689
- Platforms: 1

Other information
- Status: Disused

History
- Original company: North Eastern Railway
- Pre-grouping: North Eastern Railway
- Post-grouping: London and North Eastern Railway

Key dates
- 1 June 1905: Opened as Kenton
- 1 July 1923: Renamed Kenton Bank
- 17 June 1929: Closed to passengers
- 3 January 1966: Closed to freight
Location

Kenton Bank was a railway station on the Ponteland Railway, which ran between South Gosforth and Ponteland, with a sub-branch line to Darras Hall. The station served Kenton in Newcastle upon Tyne. It was opened in 1905 as Kenton, renamed in 1923, and was closed to passengers in 1929, and to goods traffic in 1965.

The current Bank Foot station, on the Tyne and Wear Metro, lies on the site of the original station site.

== History ==
The Gosforth and Ponteland Light Railway was formed in 1899, under the Light Railways Act 1896 (59 & 60 Vict. c. 48). Construction of the line by the North Eastern Railway was authorised by Parliament in February 1901. The station was opened, as Kenton, on 1 June 1905, the line between South Gosforth and Ponteland having opened to goods traffic, with passenger services commencing in June 1905.

In 1922, the branch line was served by six weekday passenger trains, with an additional train running on Saturday. Only three trains ran through to Darras Hall. In July 1923, the station was renamed Kenton Bank, to avoid confusion with the station of the same name on the Mid-Suffolk Light Railway.

As a result of poor passenger numbers, the station, along with the branch line closed to passengers on 17 June 1929. The station remained open for goods traffic, before closing altogether on 3 January 1966. The line through the station however remained open to serve the explosives depot at ICI Callerton, situated between Callerton and Ponteland stations, where explosives were transferred from rail to road for onward transport to quarries in Northumberland.

In May 1981, the line between South Gosforth and Bank Foot was rebuilt to become part of the Tyne and Wear Metro network. Freight traffic to and from the explosives depot continued to share the line with the metro until the depot closed in March 1989. The Metro line was later extended from Bank Foot to Newcastle Airport in November 1991. The current Bank Foot Metro station is situated on part of the site of the former station of Kenton Bank.

| Preceding station | Historical railways | Following station |
|---|---|---|
| Callerton | North Eastern Railway; Ponteland Railway | Coxlodge |
