= Regent Centre Interchange =

Tyne and Wear Metro station in Newcastle upon Tyne

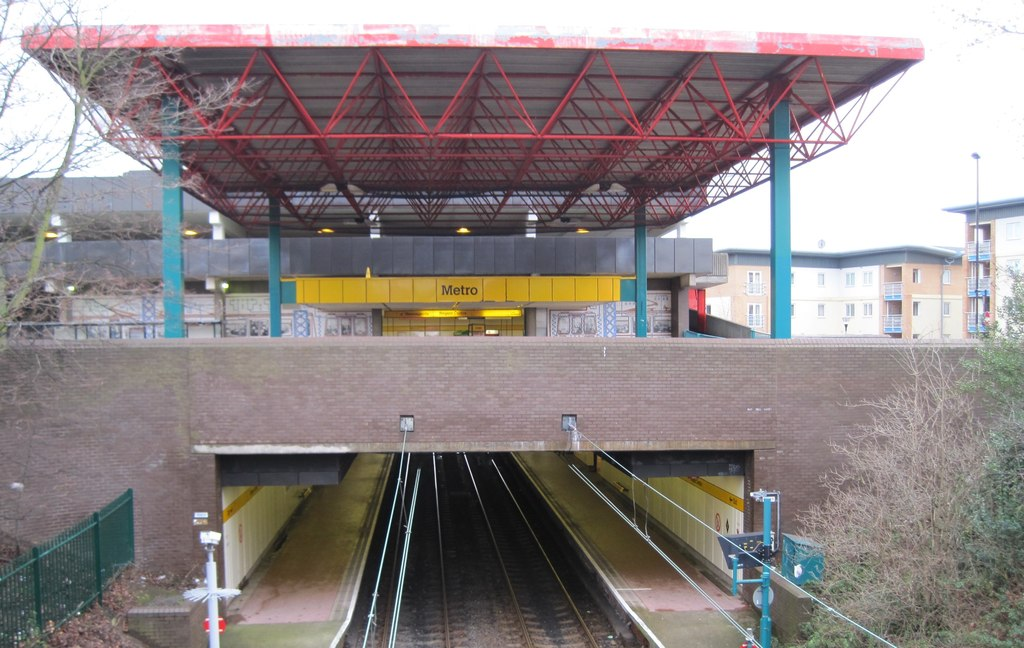
- The interchange showing (from bottom to top) the Metro station, bus station and multi-storey car park

General information
- Location: Great North Road, West Gosforth, NE3; Newcastle upon Tyne; England
- Coordinates: 55.0120°N 1.6216°W
- Grid reference: NZ 242 686
- Elevation: 62 m (203 ft)
- System: Multimodal transport hub including Tyne and Wear Metro station
- Owner: Nexus
- Line: Green line
- Platforms: 2
- Tracks: 2
- Bus stands: 5

Construction
- Parking: 183 spaces
- Cycle facilities: 5 cycle pods
- Accessible: Step-free access throughout, with lifts from street-level to platforms and level-boarding to trains

Other information
- Status: Staffed part-time
- Station code: RGC
- Fare zone: B

History
- Original company: Tyne and Wear Metro

Key dates
- 10 May 1981: Opened

Passengers
- 2020/21: ▼243,906
- 2021/22: ▲963,450
- 2022/23: ▲1.125 million
- 2023/24: ▲1.288 million
- 2024/25: ▲1.323 million

Services
Preceding station	Tyne and Wear Metro	Following station
South Gosforth towards South Hylton	Green line	Wansbeck Road towards Airport
Location
- Location within Newcastle-upon-Tyne Location within Tyne and Wear
Notes
- Metro passenger statistics from Nexus.

The Regent Centre Interchange is a multimodal transport hub, serving the suburb of Gosforth in the English city of Newcastle upon Tyne. It includes a station on the Tyne and Wear Metro, a bus station and a multi-storey car park, and is adjacent to the Regent Centre business park. It was opened in 1981.

== History ==
The interchange is located on the route of the former Gosforth and Ponteland Light Railway, which opened on 1 May 1905. West Gosforth station, which opened three months later with the introduction of passenger services on the line, was situated where the metro station's platforms are today. The line closed to passengers in June 1929, but remained open for freight traffic, including to and from the ICI Callerton explosives depot, situated between Callerton and Ponteland, and Rowntree's Fawdon factory, just west of Fawdon.

In the late 1970s the line through the site was restructured to form the second phase of the Tyne and Wear Metro, between South Gosforth and Bank Foot. The remains of the old West Gosforth station were demolished as part of this work, and the new interchange constructed. The interchange took its name from the adjacent Regent Centre business park that had been constructed in the years leading up to the conversion of the railway line to Metro.

The new metro line opened on 10 May 1981, along with the new station and interchange. Freight traffic to and from Rowntree's factory and ICI Callerton continued to pass through the station until they closed in July 1988 and March 1989 respectively. In 1991 the Metro line was extended from Bank Foot to Newcastle Airport.

The station was used by 1.323 million passengers in 2024/25. still lower than the pre-pandemic figure of 1.549 million in 2018/19.

== Facilities ==
Regent Centre Interchange consists of a two-platform station below street level, covered by the station concourse and bus station. A multi-storey car park is located above the platforms and concourse, with a tall canopy covering the entrance to the station building, extending across the bus station.

Step-free access is available at all stations across the Tyne and Wear Metro network, with two lifts providing step-free access to platforms. As part of the Metro: All Change programme, new lifts and escalators were installed at the station in 2013.

The station is equipped with ticket machines, seating, next train information displays, timetable posters, and an emergency help point on both platforms. Ticket machines are able to accept payment with credit and debit card (including contactless payment), notes and coins. The station is also fitted with smartcard validators, which feature at all stations across the network. The station houses a newsagent's shop in the ticket hall.

There is a large pay and display car park available at the station, with 183 spaces, plus eight accessible spaces. There is also the provision for cycle parking and five cycle pods available for use.

== Metro services ==
As of May 2026, the station is served by up to five trains per hour – in each direction – on weekdays and Saturday, and up to four trains per hour during the evening and on Sunday. In the southbound direction, trains run to South Hylton via Central Station and Sunderland. (Note: Prior to 12 December 2005, Green line services operated between South Shields and Newcastle Airport)In the northbound direction, trains run to Newcastle Airport.

== Bus services ==
The bus station is located above the Metro station. It opened in May 1981, and like Heworth and Four Lane Ends, was purpose-built for the Metro network.

Regent Centre Interchange is served by Arriva North East, Go North East and Stagecoach North East's local bus services, with frequent routes serving Newcastle upon Tyne, North Tyneside and Northumberland. The bus station has five departure stands (lettered A–E). Each stand is fitted with seating, next bus information displays, and timetable posters.

== Artwork ==
- A large mural features on the external wall of the station building. Created by Anthony Lowe, Metro Morning was commissioned in 1988, and depicts passengers travelling in a representation of a rush-hour train.
- Nic Armstrong's Have You Paid and Displayed? was commissioned in 2001, and features in the stairwell of the multi-storey car park. It depicts the everyday lives of the car park's users and Tyne and Wear Metro passengers, set amongst contrasting landscape images.
- Shepard Fairey's Obey mural features in the stairwell of the metro station. The mural depicts Chinese soldiers, one carrying a rifle with a rose in the barrel and a central white dove signifying peace.
