= List of parkway railway stations in Great Britain =

A parkway railway station is a railway station that primarily serves a park and ride interchange rather than a town or city centre. The name parkway originally referred to Bristol Parkway being built next to the M32 motorway, which was built through parkland and thus known as the "Bristol Parkway". The term has come to mean equally a park and ride bus and/or other motor car interchange with the UK light, regular or international railway network. One example refers to such an interchange with the tram network.

== East and West Midlands ==
- Alfreton railway station (formerly Alfreton and Mansfield Parkway)
- Birmingham International railway station
- Coleshill Parkway railway station
- East Midlands Parkway railway station
- Stratford-upon-Avon Parkway railway station
- Sutton Parkway railway station (named after Sutton-in-Ashfield)
- Tame Bridge Parkway railway station
- Warwick Parkway railway station
- Wednesbury Parkway tram stop
- Worcestershire Parkway railway station

== South, South East and East ==
- Aylesbury Vale Parkway railway station
- Cambridge North railway station
- Didcot Parkway railway station
- Haddenham & Thame Parkway railway station
- Luton Airport Parkway railway station
- Oxford Parkway railway station
- Southampton Airport Parkway railway station
- Swanley Parkway railway station (served by the Swanley New Barn Railway, a narrow gauge line taking passengers into Swanley Park)
- Thanet Parkway railway station
- Whittlesford Parkway railway station (serving equally Duxford)

== North-East and Yorkshire ==
- Apperley Bridge railway station
- MetroCentre railway station
- Callerton Parkway Metro station (Tyne & Wear Metro)
- Bank Foot Metro station (Tyne and Wear Metro)
- Kingston Park Metro station (Tyne and Wear Metro)
- Four Lane Ends Interchange (Tyne & Wear Metro)
- Regent Centre Metro station (Tyne & Wear Metro)
- Northumberland Park station
- Stadium of Light Metro station (Tyne & Wear Metro)
- Heworth Interchange
- Fellgate Metro station (Tyne and Wear Metro)
- East Boldon Metro station (Tyne and Wear Metro)
- New Pudsey railway station

== North-West ==
- Buckshaw Parkway railway station
- Horwich Parkway railway station
- Liverpool South Parkway railway station

== Scotland ==
- Edinburgh Park railway station
- Newcraighall railway station

== South-West ==
- Bodmin Parkway railway station
- Bristol Parkway railway station
- Okehampton Interchange railway station
- St Erth railway station (park-and-ride for St Ives, previously located at Lelant Saltings railway station)
- Portway Park and Ride railway station
- Tiverton Parkway railway station

== Wales ==
- Ebbw Vale Parkway railway station
- Port Talbot Parkway railway station

== Proposals and withdrawn proposals ==
- Canterbury Parkway railway station
- Cardiff Parkway railway station
- Gloucestershire Parkway railway station
- Roseberry Parkway railway station
- Rushden Parkway railway station
- West Wales Parkway railway station

== See also ==
- Parkway
- Connecting Communities: Expanding Access to the Rail Network, a 2009 report from the Association of Train Operating Companies detailing seven new commercially viable parkway station locations in England
