= Kingston Park Metro station =

Tyne and Wear Metro station in Newcastle upon Tyne

Kingston Park
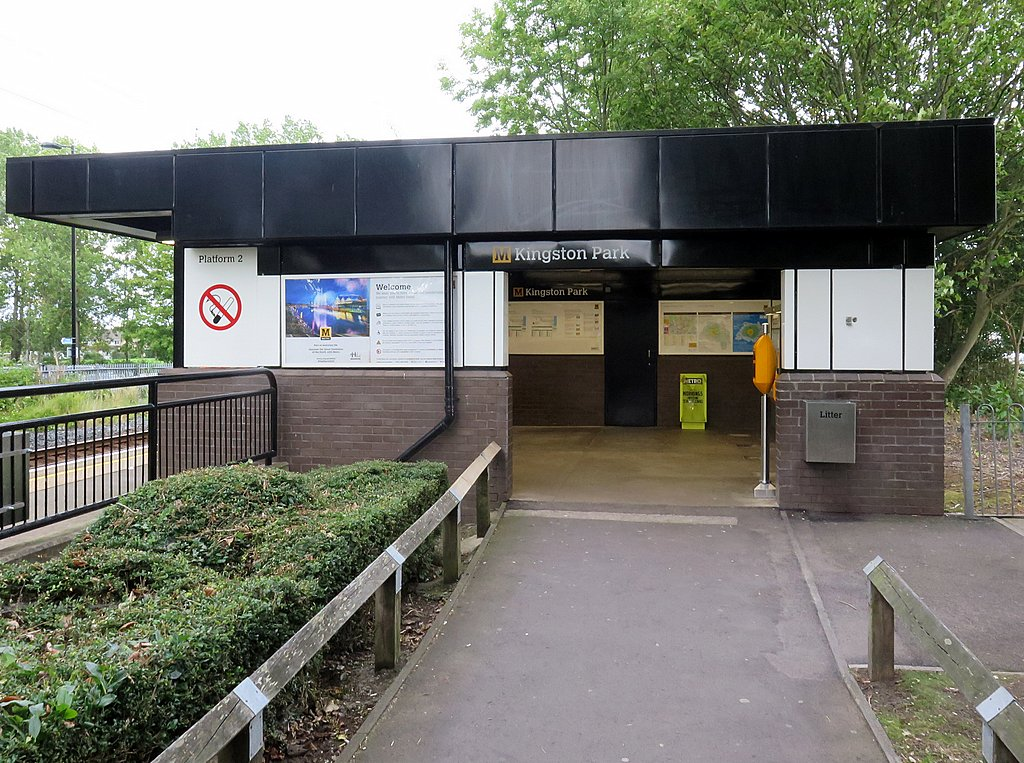

General information
- Location: Brunton Lane, Kingston Park, NE3; Newcastle upon Tyne; England
- Coordinates: 55.0142°N 1.6669°W
- OS Grid ref: NZ 214 689
- Elevation: 71 m (233 ft)
- System: Tyne and Wear Metro
- Owner: Nexus
- Line: Green line
- Platforms: 2
- Tracks: 2
- Bus stands: 3

Construction
- Parking: 96 spaces
- Cycle facilities: 5 cycle pods
- Accessible: Step-free access throughout, with level-boarding to trains

Other information
- Station code: KSP
- Fare zone: B

History
- Original company: Tyne and Wear Metro

Key dates
- 15 September 1985: Opened

Passengers
- 2020/21: ▼156,869
- 2021/22: ▲661,020
- 2022/23: ▲826,185
- 2023/24: ▲936,594
- 2024/25: ▲970,905

Services
Preceding station	Tyne and Wear Metro	Following station
Fawdon towards South Hylton	Green line	Bank Foot towards Airport
Location
- Location within Newcastle-upon-Tyne Location within Tyne and Wear
Notes
- Metro passenger statistics from Nexus.

Kingston Park is a Tyne and Wear Metro station, serving the suburb of Kingston Park in the English city of Newcastle upon Tyne. It was opened in 1985, adjacent to the level crossing carrying Brunton Lane across the railway and with staggered platforms on either side of the level crossing.

== History ==
The station is located on the route of the former Gosforth and Ponteland Light Railway, which opened on 1 March 1905, with passenger services commencing three months later, but which never included a station at Kingston Park. The line closed to passengers on 17 June 1929, but remained open to serve freight, latterly to the depot at ICI Callerton, where explosives were transferred from rail to road for onward transport to quarries in Northumberland.

In the late 1970s the line through the site was restructured to form the second phase of the Tyne and Wear Metro, between South Gosforth and Bank Foot. This opened on 10 May 1981, but again no station was provided at Kingston Park.

The development of the area surrounding Kingston Park, during the late 1970s and early 1980s, led to calls for the provision of a station. The current station eventually opened on 15 September 1985. Freight traffic to ICI Callerton continued to pass through the station until March 1989, when that depot closed, and the Metro line was extended in 1991 from Bank Foot to Newcastle Airport.

The Metro station was used by 970,905 passengers in 2024/25, slightly lower than the pre-pandemic figure of 981,303 in 2018/19.

In 2018, the station, along with others on the Airport branch, was refurbished as part of the Metro: All Change programme. The project saw improvements to accessibility, security and energy efficiency, as well as the re-branding of the station to the new black and white corporate colour scheme.

== Facilities ==
Kingston Park has two side platforms, which are staggered on opposite sides of the level crossing on Brunton Lane. The eastbound platform lies to the west of the level crossing, with the westbound platform to the east. There are separate ramped accesses to the two platforms from Brunton Lane. A pay and display car park (operated by Newcastle City Council) is available, with 96 spaces, plus four accessible spaces. There is also the provision for cycle parking, with five cycle pods available.

The station is equipped with ticket machines, waiting shelter, seating, next train information displays, timetable posters, and an emergency help point on both platforms. Ticket machines are able to accept payment with credit and debit card (including contactless payment), notes and coins. The station is also fitted with smartcard validators, which feature at all stations across the network.

== Incidents ==
On 22 March 1983 – before the station opened – a Metro service collided with a bus operated by the Tyne and Wear PTE on the level crossing. Two people were injured in the accident.

In October 2012, traffic enforcement cameras were installed at the level crossings at Kingston Park and Bank Foot.

== Metro services ==
As of May 2026, the station is served by up to five trains per hour – in each direction – on weekdays and Saturday, and up to four trains per hour during the evening and on Sunday. In the southbound direction, trains run to South Hylton (Note: Prior to 12 December 2005, Green line services operated between South Shields and Newcastle Airport.) via Central Station and Sunderland. In the northbound direction, trains run to Newcastle Airport.

== Bus services ==
The station has three bus stops enabling passengers to connect for onward journeys, with an additional stop located at the Tesco Superstore.

As of May 2025, the bus stop allocation is:

Stand	Route	Destination
A	6	Metrocentre via Kenton Bar, Newbiggin Hall, West Denton & Lemington
A	X47	Eldon Square bus station via Tudor Way, Kenton Bar & Cowgate, then express
A	X77 (Note: Peak-time journeys only.)	Eldon Square bus station via Kenton Bar & Cowgate, then express
A	X78	Eldon Square bus station via Kenton Bar & Cowgate, then express
A	X79 (Note: College journeys only.)	Eldon Square bus station via Kenton Bar & Cowgate, then express
A	Metro replacement bus via Fawdon	
B	6	Freeman Hospital via Fawdon, Gosforth & South Gosforth
B	X47	Newcastle Great Park via Roseden Way, Great Park Way & Sir Bobby Robson Way
B	X77	Darras Hall via Windsor Way, Newcastle Airport Entrance & Ponteland
B	X78	Darras Hall via Windsor Way, Newcastle Airport Entrance & Ponteland
B	X79	Kirkley Hall via Windsor Way, Newcastle Airport Entrance & Ponteland
B	Metro replacement bus via Bank Foot	
C	342	Wallsend Interchange via Newcastle Airport, Dinnington, Killingworth & Benton Asda
C	777	Morpeth via Tudor Way, Newcastle Airport, Ponteland & Kirkley Hall
D (Note: Stop D is located by the Tesco Superstore.)	M71	Newbiggin Hall circular via Tudor Way, Kenton Bank Foot

- Key:
- Bus station
- National Rail station
- Tyne & Wear Metro station
