= Ilford Road Metro station =

Tyne and Wear Metro station in Newcastle upon Tyne

Ilford Road
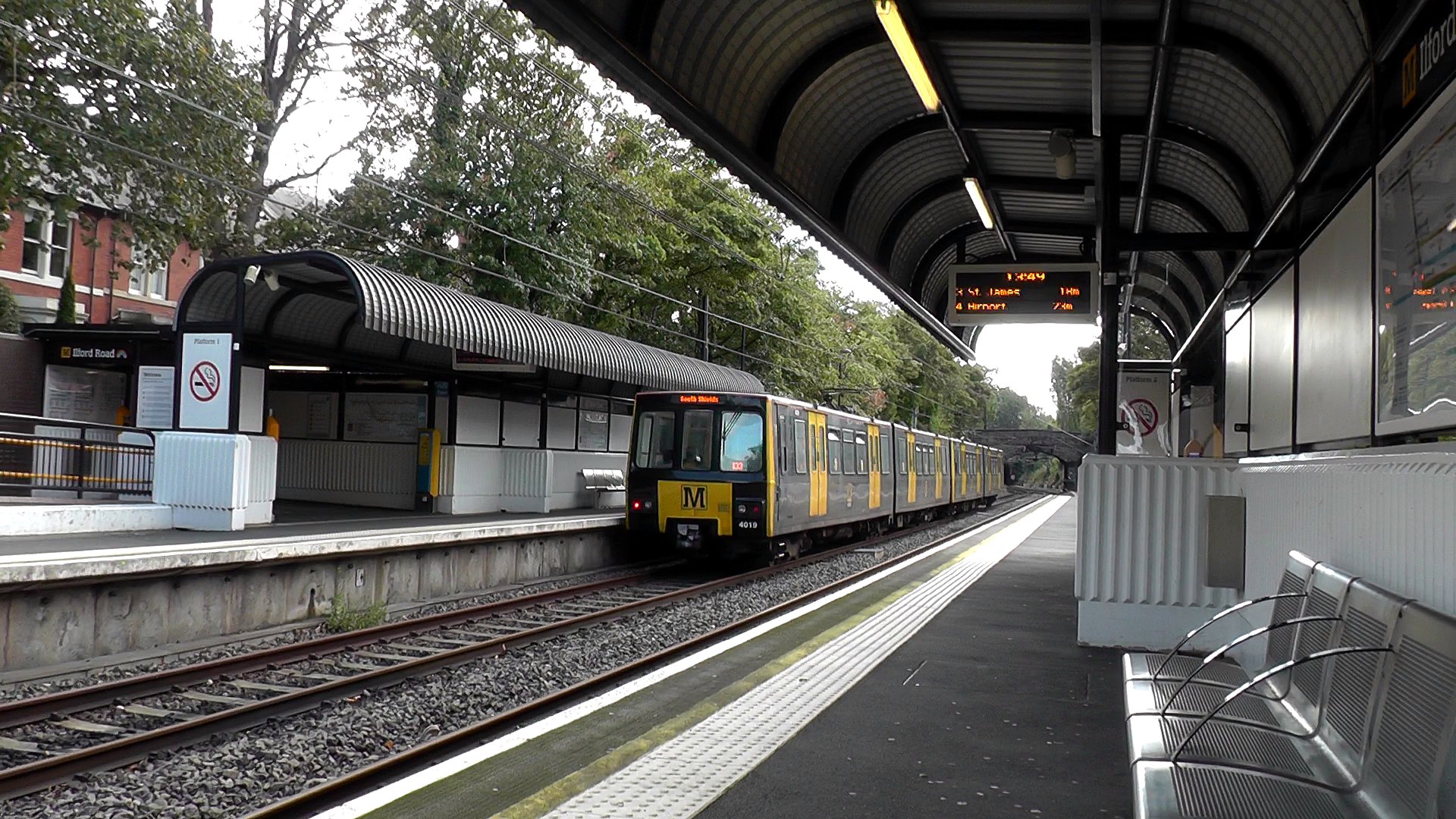

General information
- Location: Ilford Road, South Gosforth, NE2; Newcastle upon Tyne; England
- Coordinates: 55.0000°N 1.6108°W
- OS Grid ref: NZ 250 674
- System: Tyne and Wear Metro
- Owner: Nexus
- Lines: Green line; Yellow line
- Platforms: 2
- Tracks: 2

Construction
- Cycle facilities: 2 cycle pods, with space for 4 bikes
- Accessible: Step-free access to platforms, with level-boarding to Class 555 trains

Other information
- Station code: ILF
- Fare zone: A

History
- Original company: Tyne and Wear Metro

Key dates
- 11 August 1980: Opened

Passengers
- 2020/21: ▼84,380
- 2021/22: ▲350,100
- 2022/23: ▲410,809
- 2023/24: ▲412,763
- 2024/25: ▼394,928

Services
| Preceding station | Tyne and Wear Metro | Following station |
|---|---|---|
| West Jesmond towards South Hylton | Green line | South Gosforth towards Airport |
| West Jesmond towards South Shields | Yellow line | South Gosforth towards St James via Whitley Bay |
Location
- Location within Newcastle-upon-Tyne Location within Tyne and Wear
Notes
- Metro passenger statistics from Nexus.

Ilford Road is a Tyne and Wear Metro station, primarily serving the suburb of South Gosforth in the English city of Newcastle upon Tyne. It opened on 11 August 1980, as part of the first phase of the network, between Haymarket and Tynemouth via Four Lane Ends Interchange.

The platforms at Ilford Road station straddle the 55th parallel north.

== History ==
Unlike nearby South Gosforth and West Jesmond stations, which were converted from British Rail stations, Ilford Road was purpose-built for the Tyne and Wear Metro on a site with no previous station.> It was the "typical Metro halt" used in publicity when the system first opened. (Note: Ilford Road station is featured – from a variety of angles – many times in the video, to illustrate a "typical Metro halt". Including at 0:16, 2:13, 2:29, 4:37, 5:19, 6:06, 7:41 & 8:27.) When other stations were being repainted red, green or blue in the early 2000s, Ilford Road was repainted in its original brown, with much of the unpainted concrete being painted cream.

The Metro station was used by 394,928 passengers in 2024/25, considerably lower than the pre-pandemic figure of 607,413 in 2018/19.

== Facilities ==
The station has two side platforms, with separate step-free access to both via ramps. Access to the southbound platform is from the junction of Albury Road and Woodthorne Road, whilst access to the northbound platform is from Ilford Road. Access between platforms is also step-free and is via the road bridge on Moorfield Road, around 100 m (330 ft) south of the station.

There is no car parking available at the station. There is provision for cycle parking, with five cycle pods available. Each platform is equipped with ticket machines, a waiting shelter, seating, next train information displays, timetable posters, and an emergency help point on both platforms.

The ticket machines accept credit and debit cards (including contactless payment), notes and coins. The station is also fitted with smartcard validators, which feature at all stations across the network.

== Services ==
As of June 2026, the station is served by up to ten trains per hour – five trains in each direction on both of the Yellow and Green lines – on weekdays and Saturdays, and up to eight trains per hour during the evening and on Sundays. In the northbound direction, half the trains run to Newcastle Airport and half to St James via Whitley Bay. In the southbound direction, half the trains run to South Shields and half to South Hylton via Sunderland.
