= Callerton Parkway Metro station =

Tyne and Wear Metro station in Newcastle upon Tyne

Callerton Parkway
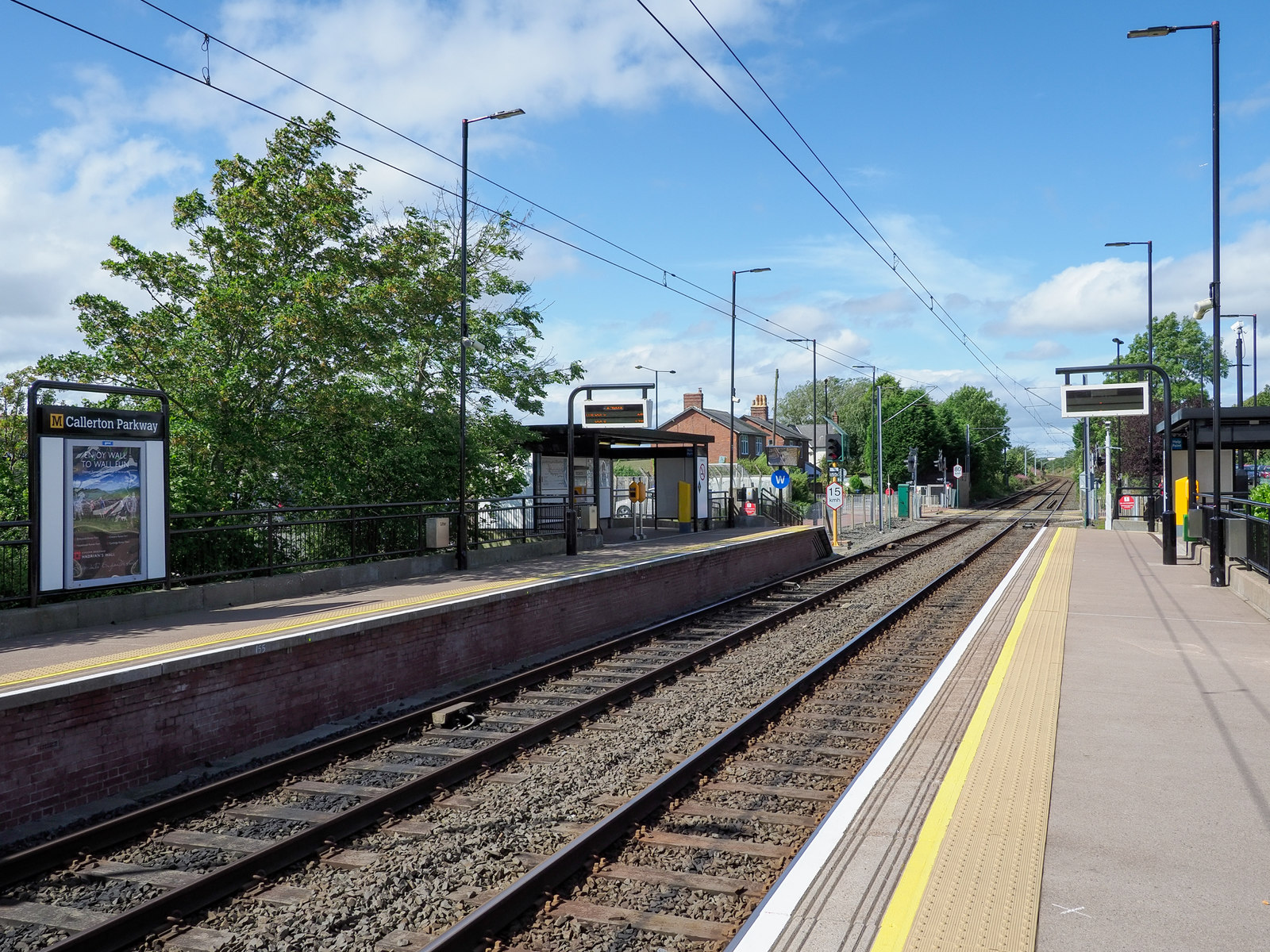
- The station platforms and level crossing, looking north towards the airport

General information
- Location: Callerton Lane, Woolsington, NE13; Newcastle upon Tyne; England
- Coordinates: 55.0278°N 1.7035°W
- OS Grid ref: NZ 1905 7040
- System: Tyne and Wear Metro
- Owner: Nexus
- Line: Green line
- Platforms: 2
- Tracks: 2

Construction
- Parking: 195 spaces
- Cycle facilities: Cycle pods for 10 bikes
- Accessible: Step-free access throughout, with level-boarding to trains

Other information
- Station code: CAL
- Fare zone: B and C

History
- Original company: Tyne and Wear Metro

Key dates
- 17 November 1991: Opened

Passengers
- 2020/21: ▼40,851
- 2021/22: ▲248,003
- 2022/23: ▲328,460
- 2023/24: ▼326,831
- 2024/25: ▲353,388

Services
Preceding station	Tyne and Wear Metro	Following station
Bank Foot towards South Hylton	Green line	Airport Terminus
Location
- Location within Newcastle-upon-Tyne Location within Tyne and Wear
Notes
- Metro passenger statistics from Nexus.

Callerton Parkway is a Tyne and Wear Metro station, serving the suburb of Woolsington, in the English city of Newcastle upon Tyne. It also serves as the railhead for the nearby settlements of Callerton, Black Callerton, High Callerton and Darras Hall. It is adjacent to a level crossing that carries Callerton Lane across the rail line. The station opened in 1991, when the Metro was extended from Bank Foot to Newcastle Airport.

== History ==
Callerton Parkway is situated on the alignment of the former Ponteland Railway, some 125 metres (410 ft) to the south-east of the site of the former Callerton railway station, which was located on the other side of the Callerton Lane level crossing. The earlier station opened to passengers in June 1905, consisting of a single platform, simple pitched roof station building, and a signal box. The line closed to passengers in June 1929, with freight services operating until March 1989.

Construction of the extension of the Metro from Bank Foot to Newcastle Airport began in 1990, after funding had been secured from the European Economic Community. Callerton Parkway opened on 17 November 1991, along with the rest of the extension.

In 2008, traffic enforcement cameras were installed at the station's level crossing – this having been the location of over half of the road traffic incidents at the five Metro-owned level crossings on the network.

In 2018, the station, along with others on the branch between South Gosforth and Newcastle Airport, were refurbished. The £300,000 project saw improvements to accessibility, security and energy efficiency, as well as the rebranding of the station to the new black and white corporate colour scheme.

The station was used by 353,388 passengers in 2024/25, considerably lower than the pre-pandemic figure of 428,078 in 2018/19.

== Facilities ==
The station has two platforms, with separate step-free access to each platform from the street. The station serves as a park and ride, with 189 spaces (plus seven accessible spaces). There is also cycle storage at the station; cycle pods with space for 10 bikes

Both platforms have ticket machines, waiting shelter, seating, next train information displays, timetable posters, and an emergency help point. Ticket machines can accept payment by credit and debit cards (including contactless payment), notes and coins. The station is also fitted with smartcard validators, which feature at all stations across the network.

== Services ==
As of May 2026, the station is served by up to five trains per hour – in each direction – on weekdays and Saturday, and up to four trains per hour during the evening and on Sunday. In the southbound direction, trains run to South Hylton via Central Station and Sunderland. (Note: Prior to 12 December 2005, Green line services operated between South Shields and Newcastle Airport.) In the northbound direction, trains run to Newcastle Airport.
