= Ponteland =

Town and civil parish in Northumberland, England

Coordinates: 55.048°N 1.747°W

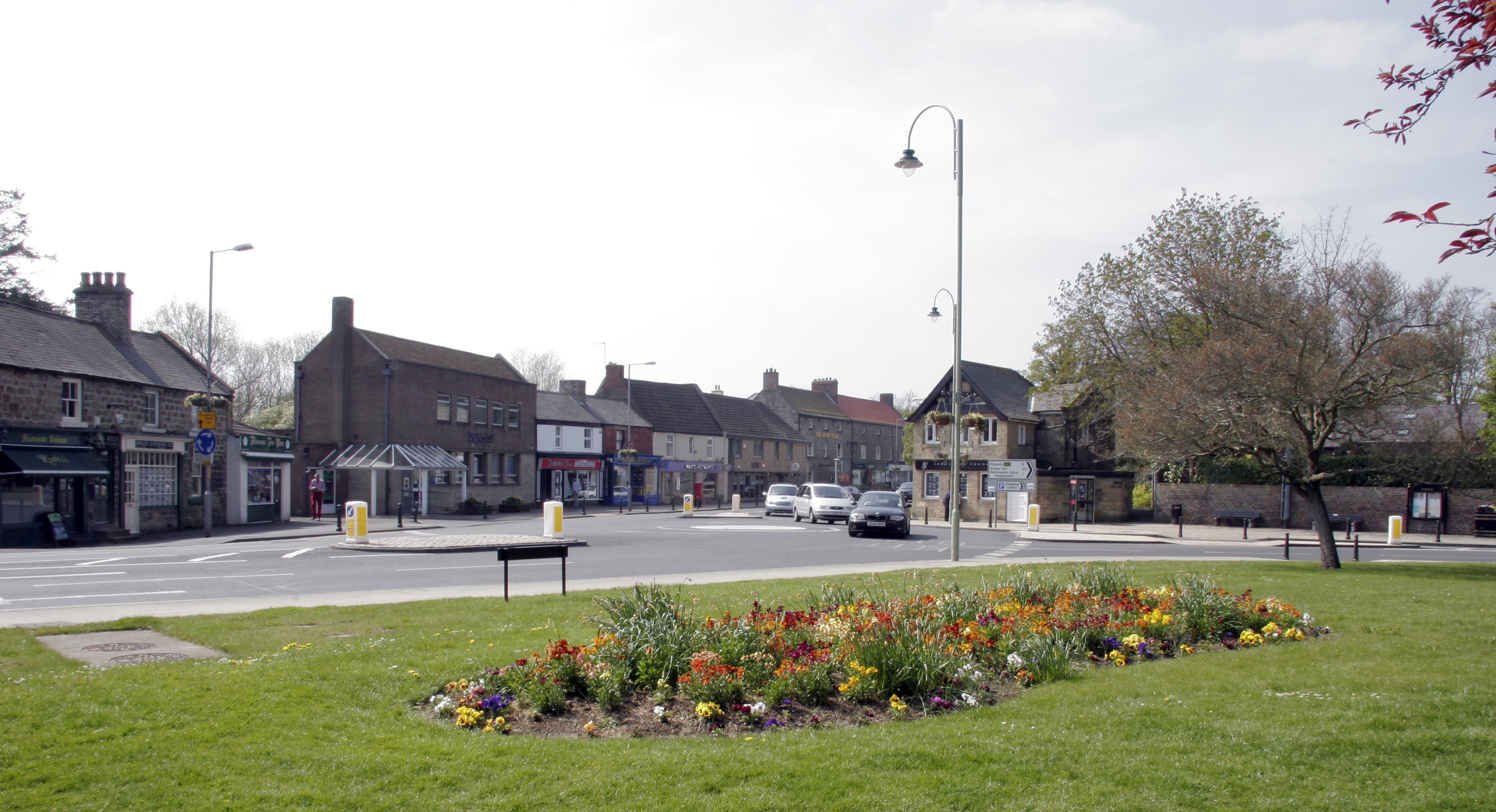
- Central roundabout in Ponteland

- Location within Northumberland
- Area: 5.757 km^{2} (2.223 sq mi)
- Population: 10,921 (parish) (2011)
  - Density: 1,897/km^{2} (4,910/sq mi)
- OS grid reference: NZ161726
  - London: 409 km (254 mi) SSE
- Civil parish: Ponteland
- Unitary authority: Northumberland
- Region: North East
- Country: England
- Sovereign state: United Kingdom
- Post town: NEWCASTLE UPON TYNE
- Postcode district: NE20
- Dialling code: 01661
- Police: Northumbria
- Fire: Northumberland
- Ambulance: North East
- UK Parliament: Hexham
- Website: www.ponteland-tc.gov.uk

Ponteland (/pɒnˈtiːlənd/ pon-TEE-lənd) is a town and civil parish in Northumberland, England. It is 8 miles (13 km) northwest of Newcastle upon Tyne.

Built on marshland near St Mary's Church and the old bridge, most marshland has now been drained to make way for housing. In the industrial era, the settlement expanded with the development of Darras Hall. Parts of Ponteland have some of North-East England's most expensive houses; being just outside Newcastle, near the airport and on the edge of rural countryside.

The civil parish includes the old village of Ponteland, the Darras Hall estate, and the villages of Kirkley, Medburn, Milbourne and Prestwick.

== Toponymy ==
The name Ponteland, first attested in 1256, means "island in the Pont" or "agricultural land by the Pont", after the River Pont which flows from west to east and joins the River Blyth further downstream, before flowing into the North Sea. The river-name Pont itself comes from Brittonic *pant, 'valley'.

Kirkley is thought to originate in the Brittonic word whose modern Welsh form is cruc meaning 'hill', compounded with the Old English word hlæw, also meaning 'hill'.

== History ==
There has been nearly a thousand years of Christian worship in Ponteland. This traditionally concentrated around St Mary's the Virgin, the prominent Church of England church near Ponteland's village green. St Mary's traces its first construction to the Norman period in the twelfth century and is still an active church. Ponteland has parish registries dating from 1602 and has been recorded in Bishops transcripts as an important place of religion since 1762.

Christian worship in Ponteland has expanded to other denominations in recent centuries. The Ponteland Methodist Church opened in 1841. An 1848 review appreciated Ponteland also hosted places of worship for Scottish Presbyterians and a Wesleyan chapel.

In 1867, an Anglican sister church to St Mary's opened in Milbourne, one of Ponteland's wards. In 1884, a Catholic church was established at St Matthews, now part of the Hexham and Newcastle Catholic diocese. In the twentieth century, a United Reformed Church opened in Darras Hall.

In the 13th century, Ponteland narrowly escaped conflict when the Treaty of Newcastle (1244) ensured a last minute peace between Scottish and English forces. The treaty bears the name of Ponteland's nearest city but was actually signed in the village.

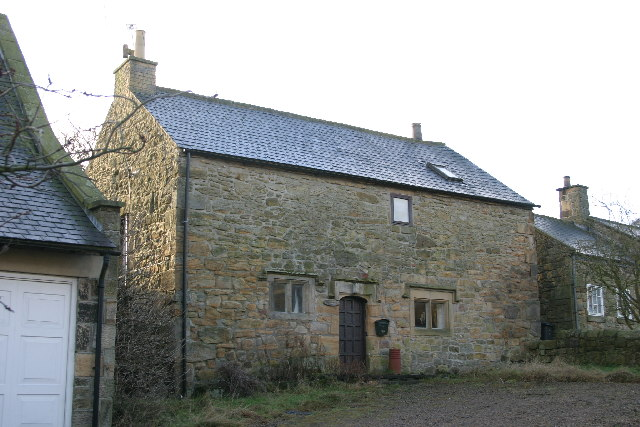
Rebellion House, a Bastle house in High Callerton adjoining Ponteland, fortified against (presumably Scottish) raiders. The deliberate lack of windows is noticeable.

During the 14th century, Ponteland was less fortunate. Scottish forces destroyed part of Ponteland Castle, as prelude to the Battle of Otterburn in 1388, twenty miles (thirty kilometres) northwest of Ponteland. Taking advantage of English distractions in the Hundred Years’ War with France, 1337–1453, this battle saw a decisive defeat for English forces and the expansion of Scottish influence in Ponteland's Middle Ages experience.

While Ponteland Castle was never rebuilt as a military stronghold, it transformed into a public house. Known as The Blackbird, this still serves the Ponteland community, nearly seven hundred years after the destruction of its original purpose.

Parts of Darras Hall were used as a prisoner-of-war camp in the Second World War. The camp was designated number 69 of several hundred camps across Britain and held Italian and German prisoners of war. Reflecting the post-war growth of the village, Ponteland High School opened in 1972. The affluent housing estate of Darras Hall is a popular choice for many of North East England's wealthy residents and many people associated with Newcastle United Football Club live in the parish including Alan Shearer, Peter Beardsley, Steven Taylor, George Hall, Phil Barton and Terry McDermott.

In 2005, Darras Hall received considerable media attention when a convicted rapist moved to the estate, after purchasing a house with his National Lottery winnings.

In the early 21st century, an expanding Ponteland and the adjoining Darras Hall was home to approximately 11,000 people.

== Notable landmarks ==
Ponteland is notable for a ruined pele tower, its bridge, and its four churches: St Mary's (Church of England), St Matthew's (Roman Catholic), Ponteland Methodist Church and Ponteland United Reformed Church.

St Mary's churchyard includes the Grade II listed 18th-century tombstones of Matthew Forster and William Turnbull.

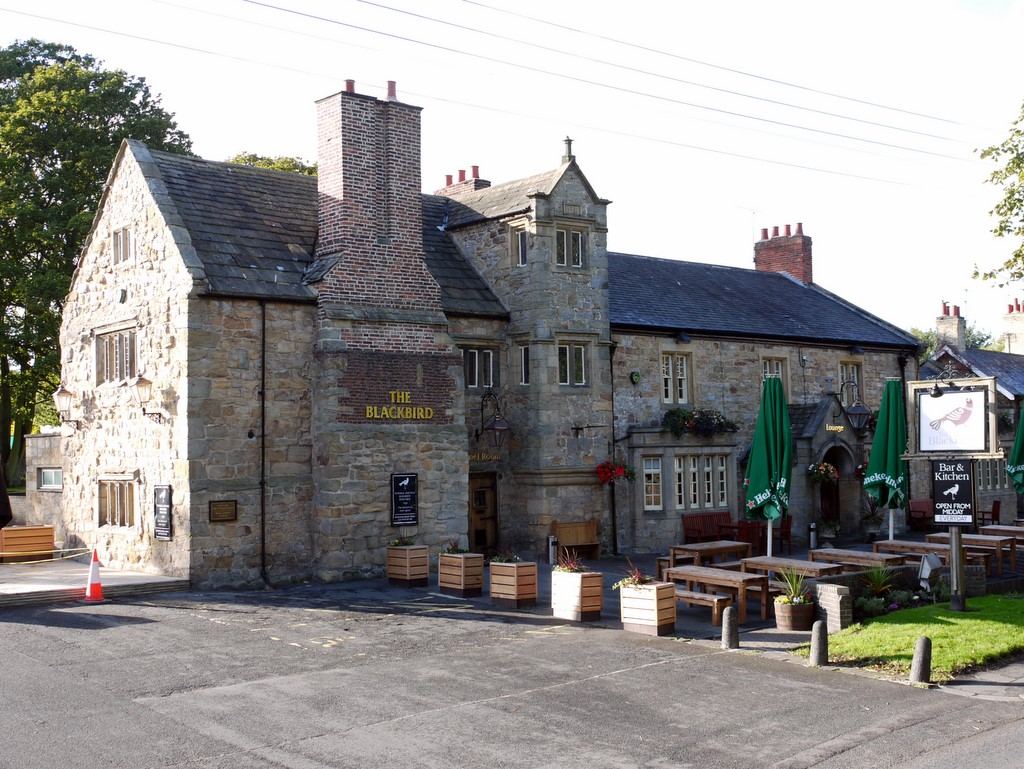
The Blackbird Inn, Ponteland, opposite St Mary’s Church

Ponteland previously boasted a small castle or tower house, which was largely destroyed by the Scottish army under the Earl of Douglas, the day before the 1388 Battle of Otterburn. The remains were incorporated into the building now occupied by the Blackbird Inn, which is rumoured to contain an old tunnel connecting it to St Mary's Church across the road. The tunnel was supposedly bricked up behind the fireplace in The Tunnel Room.

A plaque outside The Blackbird records:

Ponteland first appeared in the national history in the 13th century, when the feuds between the Kings of England and Scotland were in full spate.
The signing of a peace treaty between Henry III of England and Alexander of Scotland took place on the knoll of the marshes where the Blackbird stands today.
The castle on this site was destroyed in 1388 during the Scottish retreat from Newcastle.

To the north of Ponteland is another public house with links to Scotland. This marks an occasion during the Jacobite rising of 1745, where Scottish armies advanced into England to further claims to the English throne. During this incursion, Charles Edward Stuart, popularly Bonnie Prince Charlie, reputedly bathed at a Ponteland public house. Marking this occasion, the house is still called The Highlander.

One of the oldest houses, or farms at the time, in the Darras Hall area is Little Callerton House. The Old Mill, the house where Alan Shearer used to live, and various other dwellings in the area belonged to Little Callerton House, which is approximately 450 years old. On the edge of the estate at High Callerton, Rebellion House is a 16th-century bastle, altered and extended in the 17th century.

== Demography ==
Ponteland parish is home to 10,921 people or 3% of the Northumberland population of 316,000. Significantly more Ponteland residents live in detached housing versus Northumberland county overall; 65% of Ponteland parish residents are detached home residents versus 25% of Northumbrians. Ponteland also has significantly more ethnic minorities than Northumberland on average.

| Ponteland compared 2011 | Ponteland | Northumberland |
|---|---|---|
| White British | 91.7% | 97.2% |
| Asian | 5.0% | 0.8% |
| Black | 0.2% | 0.1% |

Ponteland has a largely Christian population, with 7,774 Christians (71.2%). This is followed by those of no religion, at 1,920 or 17.6% of the population.

| Religion (2011) | Number | Percentage |
|---|---|---|
| Christian | 7,774 | 71.2 |
| No religion | 1,920 | 17.6 |
| Not stated | 681 | 6.2 |
| Muslim | 189 | 1.7 |
| Sikh | 153 | 1.4 |
| Hindu | 137 | 1.3 |
| Buddhist | 24 | 0.2 |
| Jewish | 22 | 0.2 |
| Other | 21 | 0.2 |

== Economy ==
Ponteland residents are particularly active in commercial and financial services in northern England, southern Scotland, and the wider European Union. The parish benefits from its proximity to Newcastle Airport, which is the tenth busiest in the United Kingdom and operates frequent flights to London Heathrow, several European capitals, and North America. Ponteland residents are more likely than Northumbrians to be managers, directors and senior officials or in the professions or associate professions. Ponteland has 58% such individuals versus 38% in Northumberland overall.

== Education ==
In September 2017, the three-tier education system in Ponteland changed to a two-tier system, despite the many benefits of three-tier system that parents campaigned to keep. The two existing First Schools converted to Primary Schools, along with Richard Coates Church of England Middle School which retained its older year groups until they had completed their year 8 education. Ponteland Community Middle School remained as a middle school at this time, converting to an academy. Ponteland High School sought planning permission for a new school building in order to house the increased pupil intake at years 7 and 8. This was due to be completed in September 2020. Ponteland Community Middle School then converted to a Primary school in September 2020.

There are now four Primary schools in Ponteland: Ponteland Primary School, Darras Hall Primary School, Richard Coates Church of England Primary School and Ponteland Community Primary School. There is one Secondary school, Ponteland Community High School, which educates pupils aged 11–18.

== Media ==
Local news and television programmes are provided by BBC North East and Cumbria and ITV Tyne Tees. Television signals are received from the Pontop Pike TV transmitter in County Durham. Local radio stations are BBC Radio Newcastle, Capital North East, Heart North East, Smooth North East, Hits Radio North East, Greatest Hits Radio North East and Koast Radio, a community based station. The town is served by these local newspapers, Hexham Courant and Northumberland Gazette.

== Amenities ==
Ponteland's retail and commercial amenities concentrate around the village's main street, the nearby industrial estate, and Broadway, a small commercial zone serving Darras Hall. The former headquarters for Northumbria Police, now the location of a communications and training complex, is just north of Ponteland.

Ponteland railway station was once served by the Ponteland Railway branch line of the North Eastern Railway (later part of the London & North Eastern Railway) from Newcastle, including a short spur to Darras Hall. Plans to electrify the line were abandoned in 1907, however, and the spur line lost passenger services in 1929 when volume fell below expectations. However, a substantial part of Ponteland's railway connections have been resurrected as part of the Tyne & Wear Metro system to serve Newcastle Airport.

Reflecting its rural surroundings, Ponteland has several country walks. These concentrate around Ponteland Park and include a walk from the Diamond Inn to Kirkley and from Medburn to the Highlander Inn.

Ponteland has five public houses: The Seven Stars, The Blackbird, The Badger, The Diamond Inn and The Pont Tap.

Ponteland also has a Sainsbury's, Waitrose, Co-op and a few coffee shops and restaurants.

== Sports ==
- Ponteland United football club.
- Ponteland Cricket Club
- Ponteland RFC rugby union club

== Notable residents ==
- David Gilford Armstrong (1926–2000) animal nutritionist
- Michael Gill (1998–) professional cyclist for UCI Continental Team Saint Piran
- Alexander Isak (1999-) footballer
- Gibson Kyle (1820–1903) architect, born in Ponteland
- Cheick Tioté (1986–2017) footballer
- Alan Shearer (1970-) footballer
