= Treaty of Newcastle (1244) =

1244 treaty between England and Scotland

The Treaty of Newcastle was a treaty signed between King Henry III of England and King Alexander II of Scotland on 14 August 1244. The treaty was signed in the Northumberland village of Ponteland, eight miles northwest of Newcastle upon Tyne.

The armies of England and Scotland were en route to engage in combat after disputes concerning the exact position of the nearby Scottish-English border, dating to the Battle of Alnwick in 1174, could not be resolved. After the two opposing armies met near Newcastle Upon Tyne hostilities were set aside and a treaty signed. This set the border between Scotland and England.

The treaty was sealed by the arrangement of the future marriage of Henry III's daughter, Margaret to Alexander II's son, Alexander III of Scotland. They married in 1251 in York, when Margaret was 11 years old, and Alexander was 10 years old; they later had three children.
