= Callerton railway station =

Disused railway station in Tyne and Wear, England

Callerton

General information
- Location: Woolsington, Newcastle upon Tyne; England
- Coordinates: 55.0287°N 1.7045°W
- Grid reference: NZ189705
- Platforms: 1

Other information
- Status: Disused

History
- Original company: North Eastern Railway
- Pre-grouping: North Eastern Railway
- Post-grouping: London and North Eastern Railway

Key dates
- 1 June 1905: Opened
- 17 June 1929: Closed to passengers
- 29 November 1965: Closed to freight
Location

Callerton was a railway station on the Ponteland Railway, which ran between South Gosforth and Ponteland, with a sub-branch line to Darras Hall. The station served Woolsington in Newcastle upon Tyne. It was opened in 1905, closed to passengers in 1929, and to goods traffic in 1965.

The current Callerton Parkway station, on the Tyne and Wear Metro, lies just to the south-east of the original station site.

== History ==
The Gosforth and Ponteland Light Railway was formed in 1899, under the Light Railways Act 1896 (59 & 60 Vict. c. 48), and construction of the line, by the North Eastern Railway, was authorised by Parliament in February 1901. In March 1905, the 7-mile section from South Gosforth to Ponteland was opened to goods traffic, with passenger services commencing in June 1905.

Callerton station was opened on 1 June 1905. The original station building was destroyed by fire in March 1915, and was later replaced by a replica. In 1913, goods traffic arriving at the station included potatoes, livestock, hay and clover. In 1922, the branch line was served by six weekday passenger trains, with an additional train running on Saturday. Only three trains ran through to Darras Hall.

As a result of poor passenger numbers, the station, along with the branch line closed to passengers on 17 June 1929. The station remained open for goods traffic, before closing altogether on 29 November 1965. The station was demolished almost entirely by 1973. The line through the station remained open until March 1989, to serve the explosives depot at ICI Callerton, situated between Callerton and Ponteland stations, where explosives were transferred from rail to road for onward transport to quarries in Northumberland.

In May 1981, a section of the former branch line was reopened in stages between South Gosforth and Bank Foot, as part of the Tyne and Wear Metro network. The line was later extended from Bank Foot to Newcastle Airport in November 1991, with an intermediate station at Callerton Parkway. Callerton Parkway was built some 125 metres (410 ft) to the south-east of the former station at Callerton, on the opposite side of the level crossing over Callerton Lane.

Preceding station	Historical railways	Following station
Ponteland	North Eastern Railway; Ponteland Railway	Kenton Bank
