= Milbourne, Northumberland =

Village in Northumberland, England

Coordinates: 55.379548°N 2.0175841°W

Milbourne
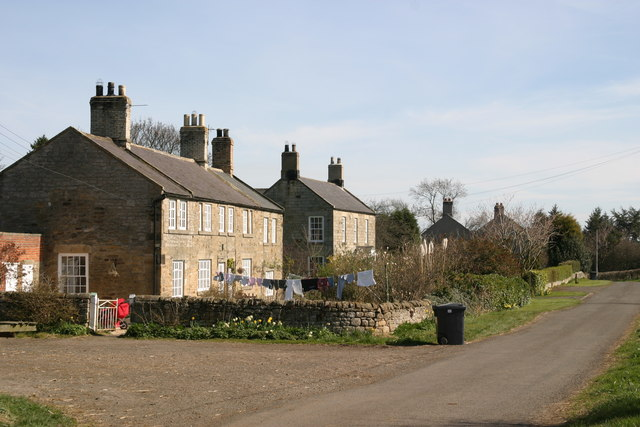

- Location within Northumberland
- Civil parish: Ponteland
- Unitary authority: Northumberland
- Ceremonial county: Northumberland
- Region: North East
- Country: England
- Sovereign state: United Kingdom
- Police: Northumbria
- Fire: Northumberland
- Ambulance: North East

Milbourne is a village and former civil parish 14 miles (23 km) from Morpeth, now in the parish of Ponteland, in the county of Northumberland, England. In 1951 the parish had a population of 70. Milbourne has a church called Holy Saviour.

== History ==
The name "Milbourne" means 'Mill stream'. From 1866 Milbourne was a civil parish in its own right until it was merged with Ponteland on 1 April 1955. A chapel was recorded in Milbourne in 1202 but its location has been lost and was last recorded in 1575.

== See also ==
- Milbourne Hall
