= Country Style Foods Limited (UK) =

English bakery company

Country Style Foods Limited is a bakery company that manufactures bread, cakes and baked goods, supplying in-store bakeries of major retailers and food service companies. It has its headquarters in the English city of Leeds, with operating sites in Berwick upon Tweed, Bridlington, Grimsby, Kettering, Newcastle upon Tyne, Stockton on Tees and Worcester.

The company was founded by Tony and Christine Wood in 1961. In February 2011, following the collapse of Polestar Foods, Devonshire Desserts was formed and production restarted at the former desserts factory in Okehampton, Devon. In October 2016, Country Style purchased a plant in Berwick upon Tweed previously owned by General Mills. In November 2017, Country Style bought the Elisabeth the Chef bakery business from the French Senoble group. In November 2023, it was announced that the Nestle UK's Fawdon Factory, in Newcastle upon Tyne, had been purchased by Country Style Foods and their factory in Okehampton closed in 2022 and was demolished in 2025/26.

Country Style Foods was fined £140,000 by the HSE after a worker was seriously injured in an accident involving a modified mobile ladder.
