= Jolly Bus =

British bus operating company

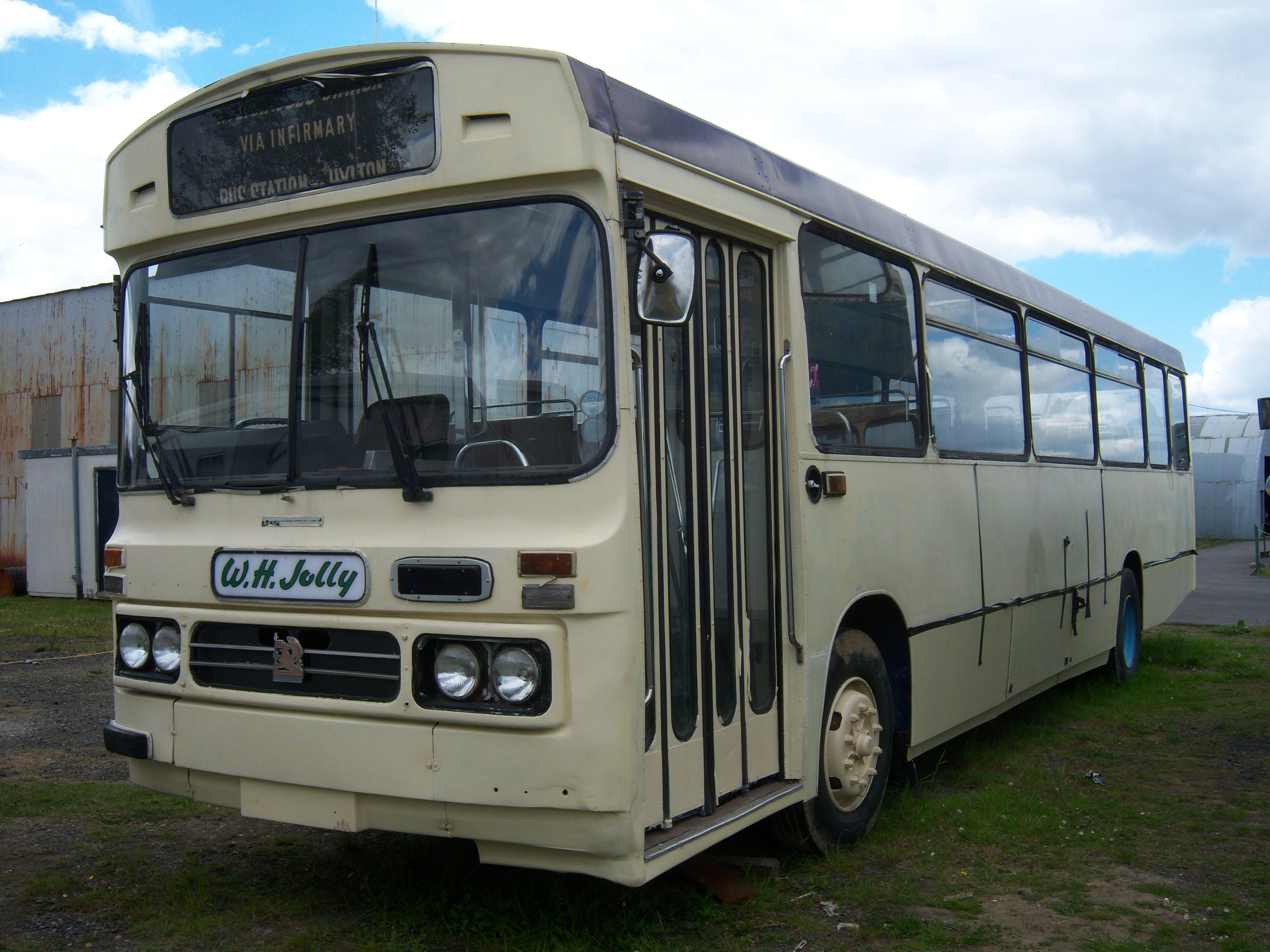
- A preserved former Jolly Bus seen in 2015
- Founded: July 1923
- Ceased operation: July 1995
- Service area: Sunderland, England
- Service type: Bus operator

Jolly Bus was an English bus company operating in Sunderland from 1923 until 1995.

== History ==
In July 1923, WH Jolly commenced operating a service from South Hylton to Sunderland. Following the closure of the railway it was extended from the outskirts of Sunderland into the city centre.

The Jolly Bus ran from Claxheugh Road (map) in South Hylton to Evesham (map) and Sunderland city centre (map).

The Jolly Bus trademark features were both the colour, cream with a brown stripe, and the rear seat, made of varnished wooden slats. WH Jolly also ran a small number of coaches.

After deregulation, pressure from other services and the announcement of the Tyne & Wear Metro extension to Sunderland and South Hylton caused the company to cease operations on 1 July 1995.

After the company closed the buses were sold to other companies. It is believed Duple Dominant bodied Bedford YMT KTY 23X was sold to Emsworth & District before being donated to Asia Bus Response, as a response to the Tsunami Disaster of 26 December 2004.

Duple Dominant bodied Bedford YMTs BGR 683W and BGR 684W were sold to Minsterley Motors, the latter operated until at least 2006 as a school bus for Mary Webb School and Science College in Pontesbury. It has since been preserved.
