= Coxlodge =

Area of Newcastle upon Tyne, England

Coordinates: 55.009°N 1.641°W

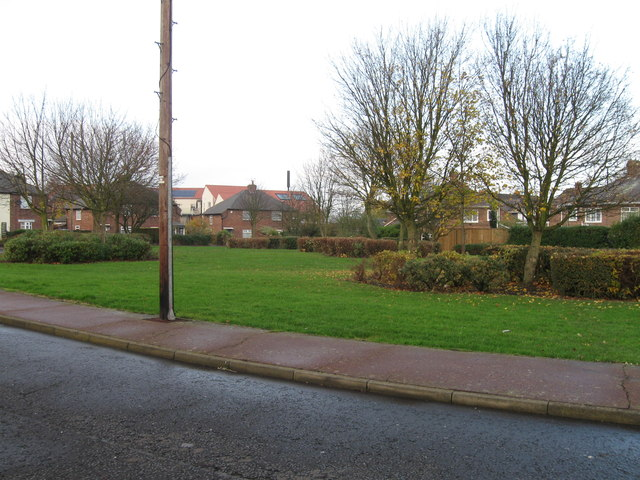

- Location within Tyne and Wear
- OS grid reference: NZ230683
- Metropolitan borough: Newcastle upon Tyne
- Metropolitan county: Tyne and Wear
- Region: North East
- Country: England
- Sovereign state: United Kingdom
- Post town: NEWCASTLE UPON TYNE
- Postcode district: NE3
- Dialling code: 0191
- Police: Northumbria
- Fire: Tyne and Wear
- Ambulance: North East
- UK Parliament: Newcastle upon Tyne North

Coxlodge is an area situated between Fawdon, Gosforth and Kenton in Newcastle upon Tyne, in the county of Tyne and Wear, England. Until 1974 it was in Northumberland.

== History ==
Coxlodge was formerly a township in the parish of Gosforth, in 1866 Coxlodge became a separate civil parish, By order of the Local Government Board on 20 September 1872, the parishes of South Gosforth and Coxlodge were constituted into an urban district, the South Gosforth Local Board. After the Local Government Act 1894, it became the South Gosforth Urban District Council. A year later, by a Northumberland County Council order dated 14 March 1895, the title was changed again to Gosforth Urban District Council. The parishes of Coxlodge and South Gosforth were amalgamated into the parish of Gosforth on 1 April 1908. In 1901 the parish had a population of 7767. The Gosforth Urban District Council was finally abolished on 1 April 1974 to become part of Newcastle upon Tyne metropolitan borough. It is now in the unparished area of Gosforth.

The development of the colliery caused the population to expand from just 108 in 1801 to 965 in 1831. The Coxlodge Hotel was built in 1868 and later became the Trap Public House; As of 2023 The Trap is slated for demolition. By 1878 the population was 1538, and the creation of housing for miners continued into the 20th century. Additional council housing was built in the aftermath of World War One and after World War Two many of the miners cottages were replaced with additional council housing.

A school and Roman Catholic Church and School was built in 1861. A Methodist Chapel was built in 1817, and then replaced in 1874. In 1877 a Board School was built.

== Mining ==
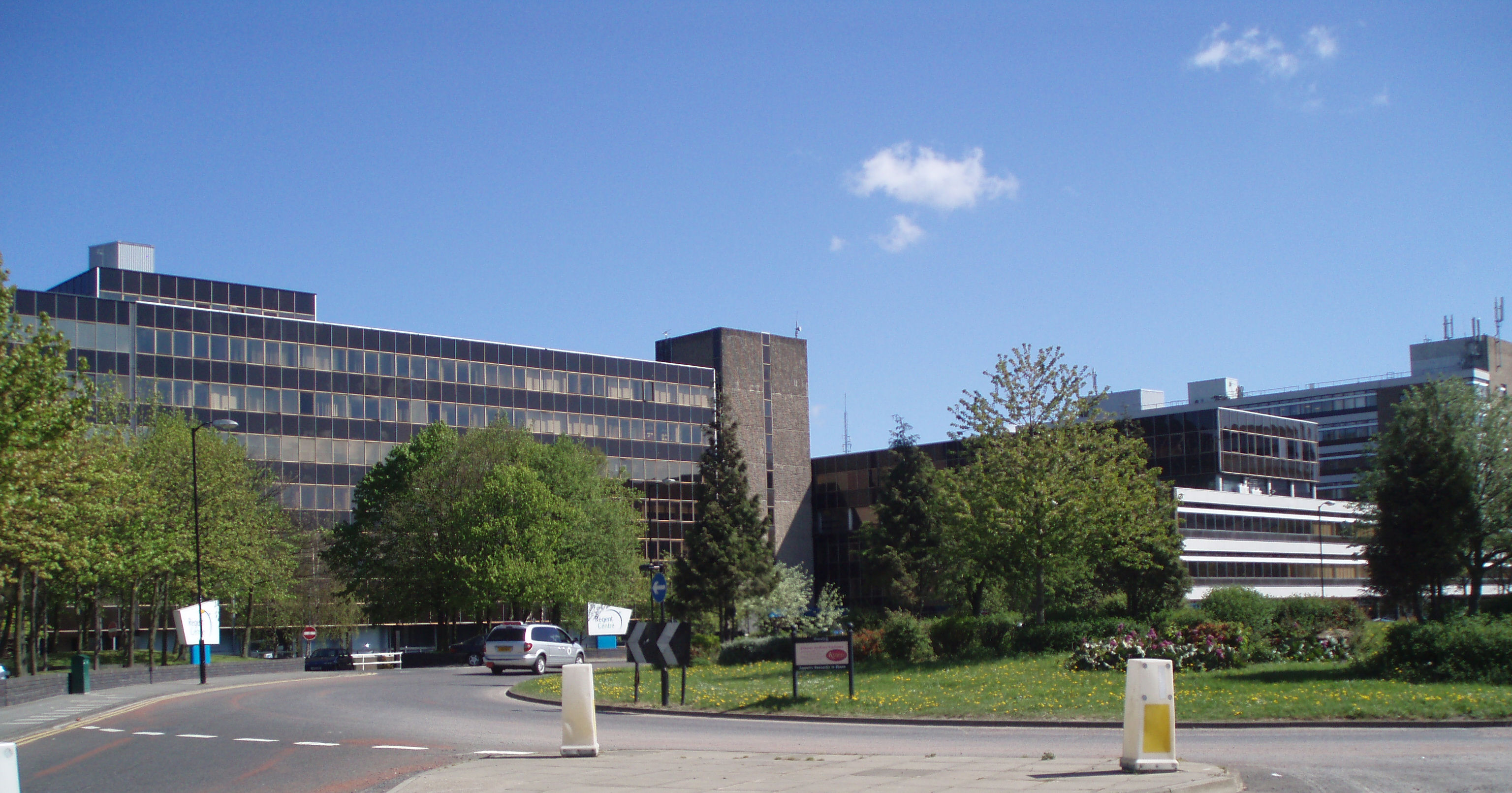
Regent Centre, a business park, which occupies land once used by the Regent Pit of the Coxlodge Colliery.

Coal mining had been in the area as early as 1757, and Coxlodge Colliery was developed by Matthew Bell and Charles John Brandling in 1809/10. There were three pits in the Coxlodge Colliery, the Bower Pit, the Jubilee Pit, which was on Jubilee Road opposite Jubilee Crescent, and the Regent Pit which is now the Regent Centre business park and St Charles R.C. School next to the current Metro line.

An explosion at the Bower pit on 6 March 1863 resulted in 19 deaths. The colliery closed on 16 June 1894 with the miners being transferred to other local pits. Some of the spoil was later used in the construction of the runway at Newcastle Airport.

== Notable residents ==
Notable people who were born in Coxlodge include Tommy Glidden, an English footballer.

Coxlodge Hall

A number of wealthy people lived in a large residence called Coxlodge Hall, which was built in 1796 by Job Bulman, a medical man originally from Gateshead who had made his money in India. Bulman lived there until he died in 1818. The hall was sold a number of times and occupants included the soap manufacturer Thomas Hedley and shipbuilders Andrew Leslie and Sir Rowland Hodge. The Hall itself was destroyed by fire in 1877, but was rebuilt two years later. The building was eventually used as a private school until it was demolished in 1939. A lodge on Gosforth High Street and the Coach House or Stables still survive. In 1950 the coach house was eventually turned into offices. The previous owners were Summers-Inman Construction and Property Consultants, who bought the coach house of Coxlodge Hall in 1972 and had since renovated the location.

In 2018 McDougall Dodds unveiled plans to turn the site into 8 residential properties, which then in-turn went on the market in 2020.

== Transport ==
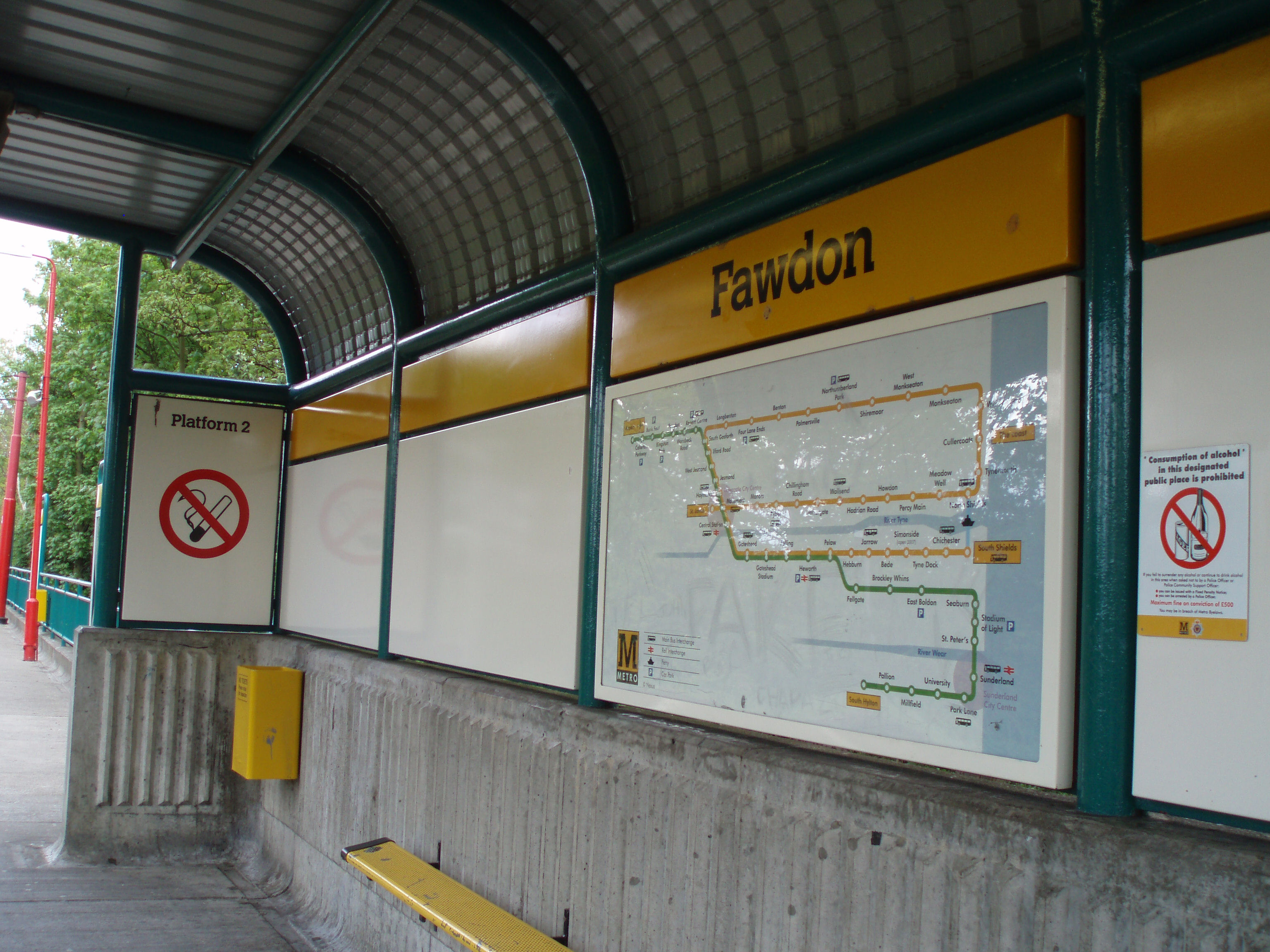
Fawdon Metro station is at the former location of Coxlodge station.

The nearest Tyne & Wear Metro stations are Fawdon and Wansbeck Road.

There used to be a railway station called Coxlodge station, which was in use between 1905 and 1929, on the Ponteland and Darras Hall Branch of the North Eastern Railway. The architect's plans of 1903 indicate that Coxlodge station was actually to be known as Fawdon, which became the Metro station name decades later. By 1973 the platform and buildings had gone, but the signal box remained until some time later; itself eventually being demolished. The site of this station is now occupied by Fawdon Metro station, which opened in 1981.

== St Nicholas Hospital ==
In the 1850s Newcastle upon Tyne's hospitals for mentally ill patients were overcrowding; a new asylum was promised in Coxlodge, where a 50-acre (200,000 m^{2}) farmstead had been purchased. It opened as Newcastle upon Tyne Borough Lunatic Asylum in July 1869. In 1882 it changed its name to Newcastle upon Tyne City Lunatic Asylum. In 1948 the National Health Service took over the hospital and changed the name to St Nicholas Hospital.
