= Fawdon Factory =

- Nestlé Fawdon
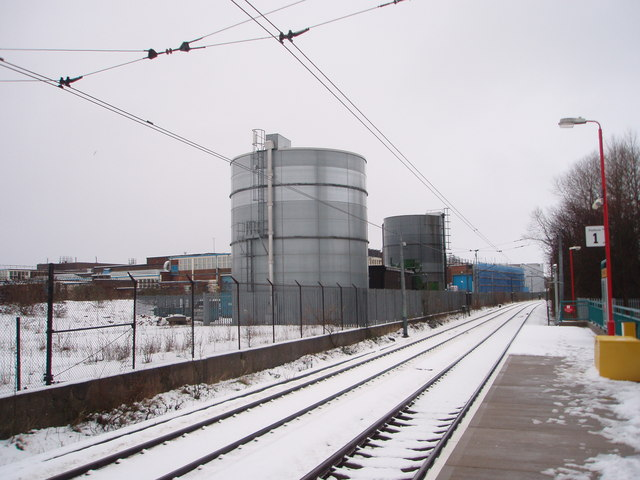
- The factory, as seen from Fawdon Metro station in January 2010

- Location within Tyne and Wear
- Former names: Rowntree's
- Alternative names: Nestlé Factory

General information
- Type: Food manufacturing plant
- Architectural style: Manufacturing plant
- Location: Fawdon, NE3 3SU
- Coordinates: 55.012°N 1.65°W
- Elevation: 60 m (197 ft)
- Current tenants: Nestlé Confectionery
- Completed: 1958
- Inaugurated: 1958
- Cost: £2m
- Client: Rowntree
- Owner: Nestlé UK Ltd

Dimensions
- Other dimensions: 26 acres

Design and construction
- Main contractor: John Laing

The Fawdon Factory is a confectionery factory at Fawdon, in the English city of Newcastle upon Tyne. The factory was built for Rowntree's, and since 1988 has been run by Nestlé. As of 2014 it was Nestlé's largest UK factory after York.

The building, but not any of Nestlé's business, is due to be transferred to Country Style Foods in 2024.

== History ==
Rowntree wanted the site of 26 acres. Rowntree was struggling to get enough workers in its main factory. The Estate and Property committee of Newcastle City Council were asked to approve the proposal on Wednesday 21 July 1954. The site would be for around eight hundred workers. Rowntree employed about 10,000 people. The council voted by 38 to 25 to let Rowntree buy the land. The Labour group on Newcastle City Council had opposed the sale, as the Labour group wanted the land to be leased, not bought.

The site would make Smarties, Fruit Gums and Fruit Pastilles.

The factory would cost around £2m, and was hoped to open in March 1958. It had 22 ovens. The site was built by John Laing.

== Operation ==
A standard working week was 42 hours on a three-shift pattern, from 8am to 4pm, and 4pm to 12am. Chocolate production began in 1971.

By 1973 the site had around 1,300 staff, and around 1500 by 1974. Company transport was provided for women workers, but not for men.

There were around 1,200 workers in 1977; most workers belonged to the General and Municipal Workers' Union.

As built, the factory had private sidings connected to the former Ponteland Railway that formed the factory's northern boundary. Between May 1981 and July 1988, when the sidings closed, freight trains accessed the factory using the tracks of the Tyne and Wear Metro, which had taken over the former Ponteland line. The metro's Fawdon station is some 500 metres (1,600 ft) to the east.

By September 1990 the factory employed around 850 workers. The factory had around 730 workers in 1996.

== Development ==
=== Rowntree ===
Disposable income was increasing in the 1970s, and sweets were heavily advertised to children on television; so the factory likewise had to expand, but automation was beginning too. In 1979 VAT on confectionery was increased from 8 to 15%. Chocolate-coated biscuits were charged VAT, but other biscuits were not.

Around 1983, consumers cut back on confectionery. A factory in Edinburgh closed around 1986, with around seven hundred redundancies, and much production moved to Fawdon. Smarties production would be moved from Fawdon in 1986.

=== Nestlé ===
In May 1988, Nestlé attempted to buy the company.

Output of confectionery doubled at the plant over the 1980s, to 33,000 tonnes; confectionery consumption in the UK was increasing. Production was moved from Glasgow in 1994, and some production was moved to Dijon in eastern France. In 1996 the Norwich factory closed with 900 redundancies, with some production moving to Fawdon. Production of the Munchies brand moved to Fawdon in 2006, from York.

In 2021 Nestlé announced plans to close the Fawdon Factory by 2023. The Caramac bar was discontinued entirely by Nestlé in 2023 rather than moving production to another site.

=== Sale to Country Style Foods ===
Following Nestlé's decision to close the factory in 2023, the property was sold to a local bakery company, Country Style Foods, in a deal to be completed in early 2024.

== Visits ==
The factory was featured on Channel 4 on 30 January 1986 in From The Inside.

== See also ==
- Nestlé Dalston, since 1992 has made packets of coffee mixes, and Coffee-Mate, on the B5299 in Dalston south of Carlisle; the factory opened in 1962
