= Bank Foot Metro station =

Tyne and Wear Metro station in Newcastle upon Tyne

Bank Foot
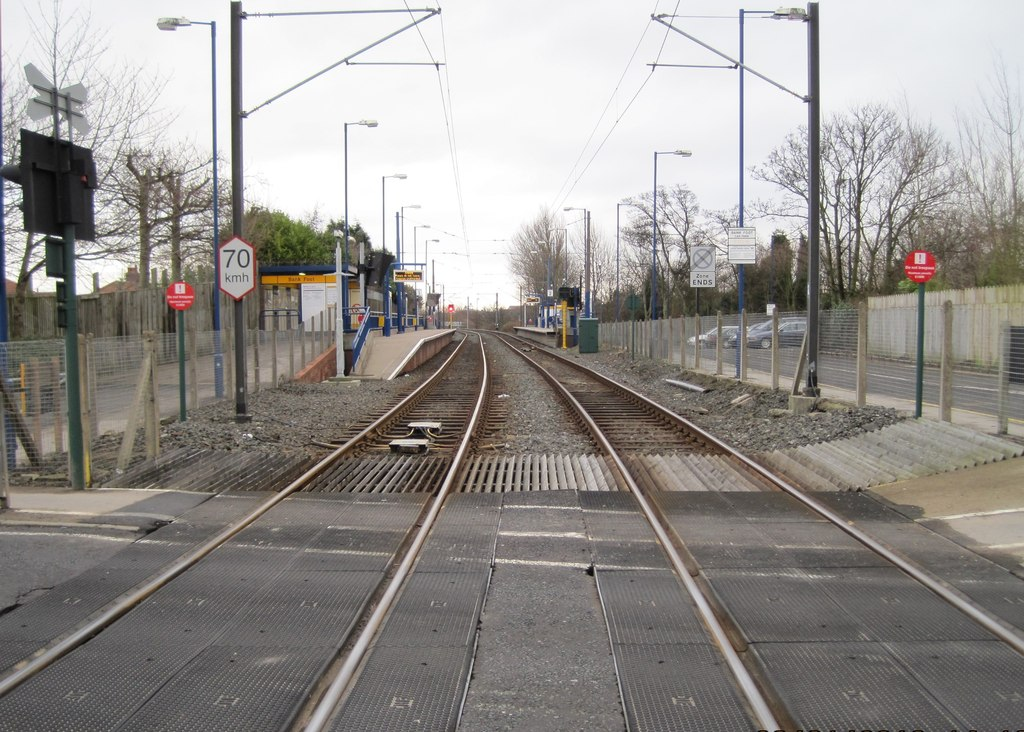
- Bank Foot station, looking east in 2010, after the Airport extension had been built

General information
- Location: Station Road, Kenton Bank Foot, NE13; Newcastle upon Tyne; England
- Coordinates: 55.0139°N 1.6781°W
- OS Grid ref: NZ 206 688
- System: Tyne and Wear Metro
- Owner: Nexus
- Line: Green line
- Platforms: 2
- Tracks: 2

Construction
- Parking: 62 spaces
- Cycle facilities: 8 cycle pods
- Accessible: Step-free access throughout, with level-boarding to trains

Other information
- Station code: BFT
- Fare zone: B

History
- Original company: Tyne and Wear Metro

Key dates
- 10 May 1981: Opened as terminus
- 17 November 1991: Line extended to Airport

Passengers
- 2020/21: ▼53,621
- 2021/22: ▲189,764
- 2022/23: ▲228,886
- 2023/24: ▲286,863
- 2024/25: ▲288,694

Services
Preceding station	Tyne and Wear Metro	Following station
Kingston Park towards South Hylton	Green line	Callerton Parkway towards Airport
Location
- Location within Newcastle-upon-Tyne Location within Tyne and Wear
Notes
- Metro passenger statistics from Nexus.

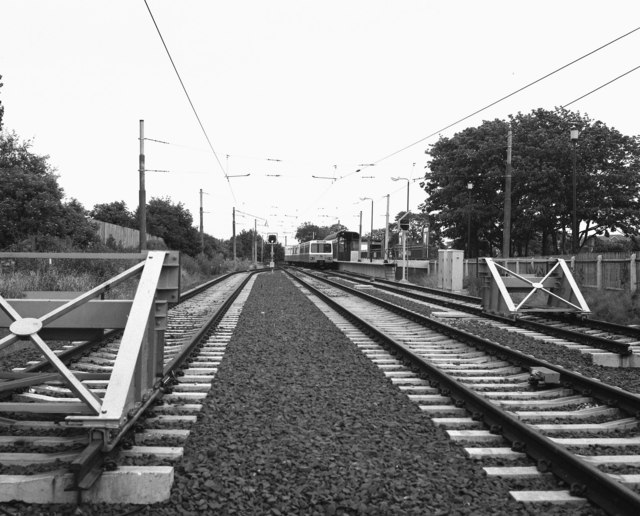
Bank Foot station, looking east in 1981, before the Airport extension was built

Bank Foot is a Tyne and Wear Metro station, serving the suburbs of Woolsington and Kenton in the English city of Newcastle upon Tyne. It opened as a single-platform terminal station in 1981, as part of Metro phase two, between South Gosforth and Bank Foot. It was reconfigured as a two-platform through station in 1991, with the opening of the extension to Newcastle Airport.

== History ==
The Metro station is located at the site of the former Kenton Bank station, which opened on 1 June 1905 as part of the Gosforth and Ponteland Light Railway. The line closed to passengers on 17 June 1929, with goods services operating from the station until January 1966. The line through the station however remained open to serve the explosives depot at ICI Callerton, situated between Callerton and Ponteland stations, where explosives were transferred from rail to road for onward transport to quarries in Northumberland.

The Metro station opened on 10 May 1981. As opened, the approach from the east was single track opening out into three tracks. On the south side was the platform line, serving the station's single platform (now used by trains towards Airport). On the north side, there was a siding used by Metro, and in the middle a non-electrified through line for freight services to ICI Callerton. The ownership boundary between Metro and British Rail was the level crossing on Station Road, to the west of the station.

In March 1989, ICI Callerton closed, and freight services through the station ceased. The following year, the construction of the extension of the Metro from Bank Foot to Newcastle Airport commenced, after funding had been secured from the European Economic Community. The extension used the alignment of the former freight line to the west of Bank Foot, ownership of which was transferred to the Metro.

At the same time, the single-track bridge to the east of the station was re-built as double track, with Bank Foot station re-modelled as a double track station. A second platform was built on the north side (now used for trains towards South Hylton). The level crossing was also re-built in the same style as the other open level crossings on the system. Following the opening of the 3.5 km (2.2 mi) line between Bank Foot and Newcastle Airport on 17 November 1991, the station opened to through services.

During the construction of the line, dedicated bus route M77 operated between Bank Foot and Newcastle International Airport.

In October 2012, traffic enforcement cameras were installed at the level crossings at Bank Foot and Kingston Park.

The station was used by 288,694 passengers in 2024/25. having recovered to the pre-pandemic figure of 282,785 in 2019/20.

In 2018, the station, along with others on the Newcastle Airport branch, was refurbished as part of the Metro: All Change programme. The project saw improvements to accessibility, security and energy efficiency, as well as the rebranding of the station to the new black and white corporate colour scheme.

== Facilities ==
The station has two platforms, with separate step-free ramped access to each platform from the street. A pay-and-display car park is available, with 62 spaces. There is also the provision for cycle parking, with eight cycle pods.

The station is equipped with ticket machines, waiting shelter, seating, next train information displays, timetable posters, and an emergency help point on both platforms. Ticket machines are able to accept payment with credit and debit card (including contactless payment), notes and coins. The station is also fitted with smartcard validators, which feature at all stations across the network.

== Services ==
As of May 2026, the station is served by up to five trains per hour – in each direction – on weekdays and Saturday, and up to four trains per hour during the evening and on Sunday. In the southbound direction, trains run to South Hylton via Central Station and Sunderland. (Note: Prior to 12 December 2005, Green line services operated between South Shields and Newcastle Airport.) In the northbound direction, trains run to Newcastle Airport.
