= Darras Hall railway station =

Disused railway station in Northumberland on the Ponteland Railway

Darras Hall
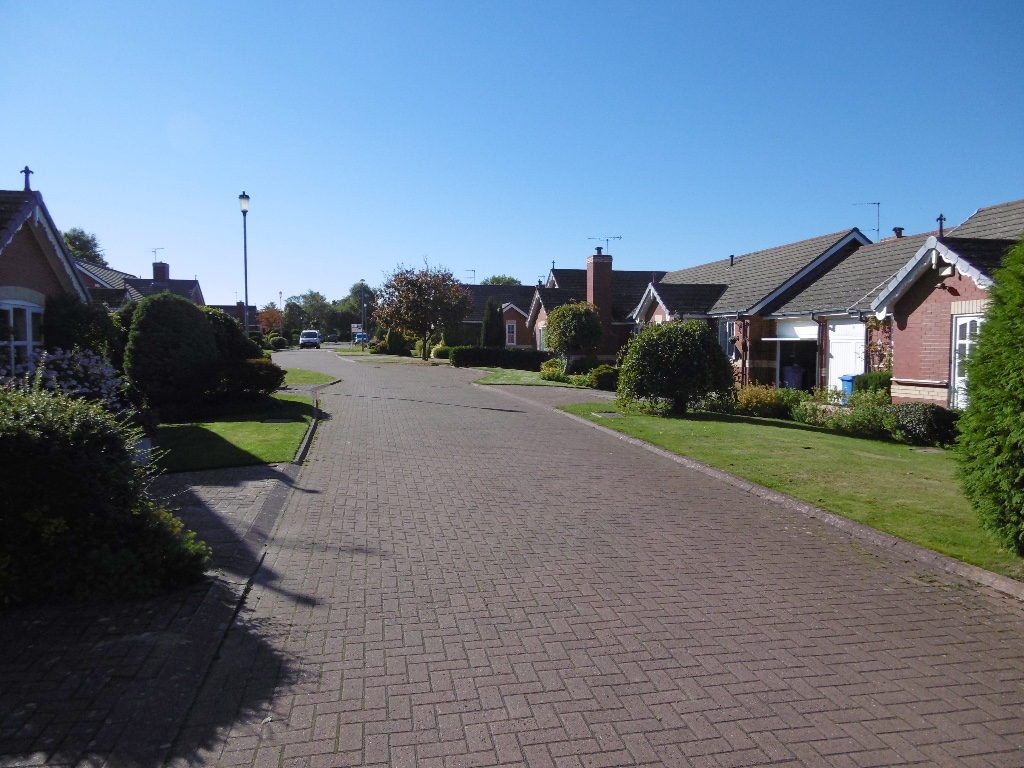
- The old station court in 2015

General information
- Location: Darras Hall, Northumberland; England
- Coordinates: 55.0374°N 1.7641°W
- Grid reference: NZ151714
- Platforms: 1

Other information
- Status: Disused

History
- Original company: North Eastern Railway
- Pre-grouping: North Eastern Railway
- Post-grouping: London and North Eastern Railway

Key dates
- 1 October 1913: Opened
- 17 June 1929: Closed to passengers
- 2 August 1954: Closed to freight

Darras Hall was a railway station on the Ponteland Railway, which ran between South Gosforth and Ponteland, with a sub-branch line to Darras Hall. The station served Darras Hall in Northumberland.

The station was opened on 1 October 1913, by the North Eastern Railway. It consisted of a single timber platform, with a wooden building, and was located near to Broadway.

In the mid- and late-1920s, an unscheduled service operated from Darras Hall for colliery workers at Belsay and Wallridge. The 7½-mile line, which linked with the Ponteland Railway, was known as the Wallridge Mineral Railway.

== History ==
The Gosforth and Ponteland Light Railway was formed in 1899, under the Light Railways Act 1896 (59 & 60 Vict. c. 48). Construction of the line by the North Eastern Railway was authorised by Parliament in February 1901.

In March 1905, the 7-mile section from South Gosforth to Ponteland was opened to goods traffic, with passenger services commencing in June 1905.

A 1^{1}/4-mile extension of the branch line to the garden city of Darras Hall in Northumberland, known as the Little Callerton Railway, was authorised in 1909. Unlike the Gosforth and Ponteland Light Railway, the extension was not constructed as a light railway. Passenger services commenced between Ponteland and Darras Hall in October 1913.

In 1922, the branch line was served by six weekday passenger trains, with an additional train running on Saturday. Only three trains ran through to Darras Hall.

== Demise and closure ==
As a result of poor passenger numbers, the station, along with the branch line closed to passengers on 17 June 1929. The line had operated passenger services between Ponteland and Darras Hall for just sixteen years at the time of closure. Darras Hall remained open for goods traffic until 2 August 1954.

Preceding station	Historical railways	Following station
Ponteland	North Eastern Railway; Ponteland Railway	Terminus
