= Ponteland railway station =

Disused railway station in Ponteland, Northumberland

Ponteland
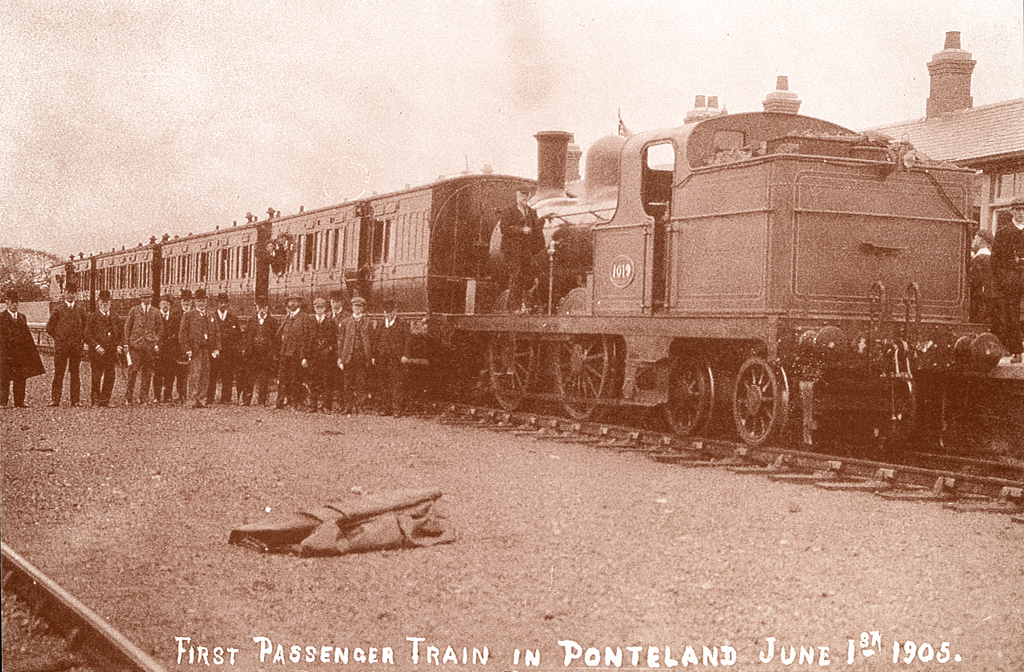

General information
- Location: Ponteland, Northumberland; England
- Coordinates: 55.0504°N 1.7463°W
- Grid reference: NZ163729
- Platforms: 1

Other information
- Status: Disused

History
- Original company: North Eastern Railway
- Pre-grouping: North Eastern Railway
- Post-grouping: London and North Eastern Railway

Key dates
- 1 June 1905: Opened
- 17 June 1929: Closed to passengers
- 14 August 1967: Closed to freight
Location

Ponteland was a railway station on the Ponteland Railway, which ran between South Gosforth and Ponteland, with a sub-branch line to Darras Hall. It served Ponteland in Northumberland.

The station was opened on 1 June 1905, by the North Eastern Railway. It was situated near to the junction of Main Street and Darras Road.

The ticket selling statistics in 1911 showed that this was the busiest station on the branch line, with 32,084 tickets sold.

The goods facilities were the largest on the branch line. Situated to the west of the station, facilities consisted of five sidings, a large goods shed, a water tower, a cattle dock and a reversing loop, in 1920.

== History ==
The Gosforth and Ponteland Light Railway was formed in 1899, under the Light Railways Act 1896 (59 & 60 Vict. c. 48). Construction of the line by the North Eastern Railway was authorised by Parliament in February 1901.

In March 1905, the 7-mile section from South Gosforth to Ponteland was opened to goods traffic, with passenger services commencing in June 1905.

A 1^{1}/4-mile extension of the branch line to the garden city of Darras Hall in Northumberland, known as the Little Callerton Railway, was authorised in 1909. Unlike the Gosforth and Ponteland Light Railway, the extension was not constructed as a light railway. Passenger services commenced between Ponteland and Darras Hall in October 1913.

In 1922, the branch line was served by six weekday passenger trains, with an additional train running on Saturday. Only three trains ran through to Darras Hall.

== Demise and closure ==
As a result of poor passenger numbers, the station, along with the branch line closed to passengers on 17 June 1929. The line had operated passenger services between Ponteland and Darras Hall for just sixteen years at the time of closure. Ponteland remained open for goods traffic until 14 August 1967. A private siding remained open until the mid-1970s.

Preceding station	Historical railways	Following station
Terminus	North Eastern Railway; Ponteland Railway	Callerton or Darras Hall
