= Ponteland Railway =

Partially operational railway line in Northumberland and Tyne and Wear

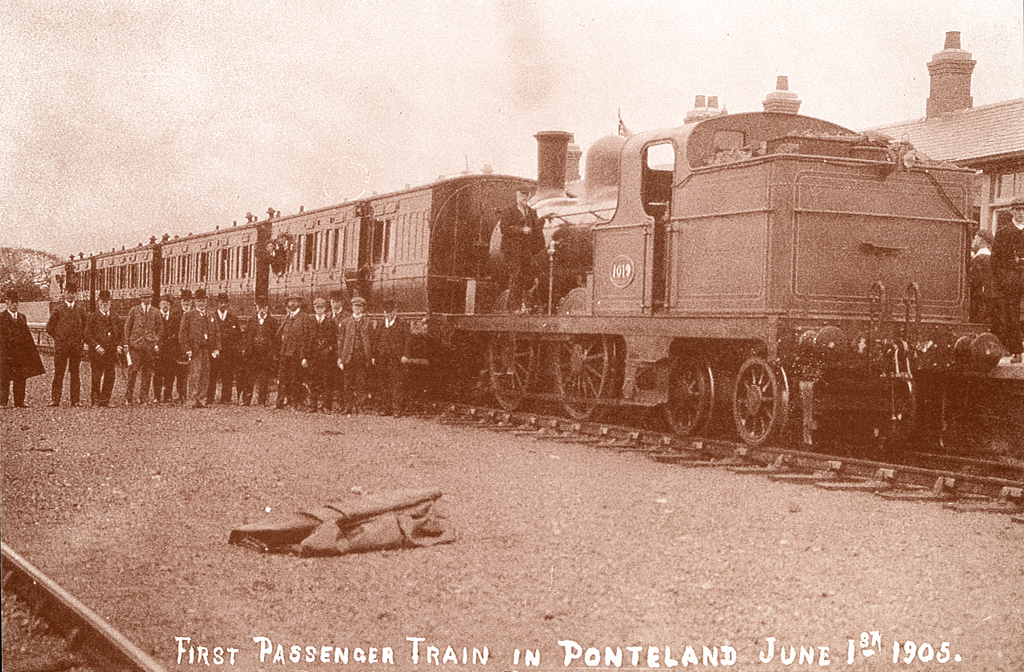

Overview
- Status: Operational between South Gosforth and Newcastle Airport
- Locale: Northumberland; Tyne and Wear
- Termini: Ponteland; South Gosforth

Service
- Type: Heavy rail (between Ponteland and Darras Hall); Light rail (between South Gosforth and Ponteland)
- Operator(s): Tyne and Wear Metro

History
- Commenced: 1 March 1905
- Closed to passengers: 17 June 1929
- Reopened to passengers: 10 May 1981 (as Tyne and Wear Metro)
- Closed to freight: 6 March 1989

Technical
- Line length: 7 miles (11 km)
- Number of tracks: Single track (1905–1981); Double track (1981–)
- Track gauge: 4 ft 8 1/2 in (1,435 mm) standard gauge
- Electrification: Overhead line, 1,500 V DC (1981–)

The Ponteland Railway was a 7-mile (11 km) single-track branch line, which linked Gosforth in Tyne and Wear with Ponteland in Northumberland. A 1 1/4-mile (2 km) sub-branch line also ran between Ponteland and Darras Hall.

The branch line between South Gosforth and Ponteland opened to passengers in June 1905, with the sub-branch line to Darras Hall opening in October 1913.

After proving to be unpopular, the branch line closed to passengers in June 1929. Freight services continued to serve the line until the late 1980s.

Since the line's closure, an 8.2-kilometre (5.1 mi) section of the line has since reopened in stages during the 1980s and 1990s, between South Gosforth and Newcastle Airport, as part of the Tyne and Wear Metro network.

== History ==
The Gosforth and Ponteland Light Railway was formed in 1899, under the Light Railways Act 1896 (59 & 60 Vict. c. 48). Construction of the line by the North Eastern Railway was authorised by Parliament in February 1901.

In March 1905, the 7-mile (11 km) section from South Gosforth to Ponteland was opened to goods traffic, with passenger services commencing in June 1905.

A 1¼-mile extension of the branch line to the garden city of Darras Hall in Northumberland, known as the Little Callerton Railway, was authorised in 1909. Unlike the Gosforth and Ponteland Light Railway, the extension was not constructed as a light railway. Passenger services commenced between Ponteland and Darras Hall in October 1913.

In 1922, the branch line was served by six weekday passenger trains, with an additional train running on Saturday. Only three trains ran through to Darras Hall.

In the mid- and late-1920s, an unscheduled service operated from Darras Hall for colliery workers at Belsay and Wallridge. The 7 1/2-mile (12.1 km) line, which linked with the Ponteland Railway, was known as the Wallridge Mineral Railway.

== Demise and closure ==
As a result of poor passenger numbers, the branch line closed to passengers on 17 June 1929. The Little Callerton Railway sub-branch line had operated passenger services between Ponteland and Darras Hall for just sixteen years at the time of closure.

Most stations had closed to goods traffic by the late 1960s, however the line remained open for freight services until 6 March 1989. In later years, the line primarily served goods traffic to and from ICI, at ICI Callerton, and Rowntree's, at Fawdon.

== Tyne and Wear Metro ==
In May 1981, an 8.2-kilometre (5.1 mi) section of the former Ponteland Railway was reopened between South Gosforth and Bank Foot, as part of the Tyne and Wear Metro network. This saw the construction of four stations at Regent Centre}, Wansbeck Road, Fawdon and Bank Foot.

In September 1985, a further purpose-built station opened at Kingston Park, between Fawdon and Bank Foot. The line was further extended in November 1991, following the opening of a 3.3-kilometre (2.1 mi) section between Bank Foot and Newcastle Airport, with an intermediate station at Callerton Parkway. The line required the construction of just 0.2-kilometre (0.12 mi) of new permanent way.

== See also ==
- North Eastern Railway
- Tyne and Wear Metro
