= Darras Hall =

Housing estate in Northumberland, England

Coordinates: 55.036°N 1.763°W

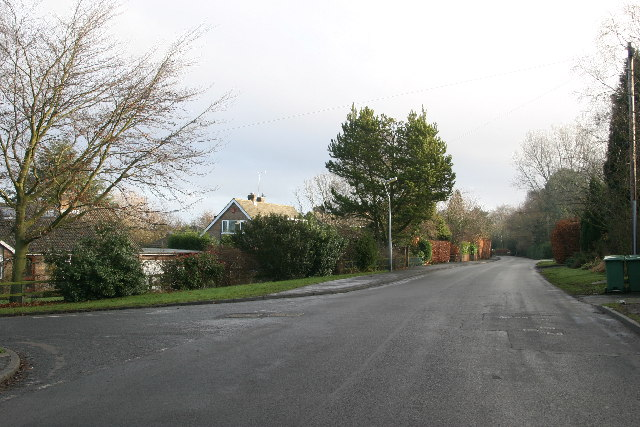
- Typical road in the estate

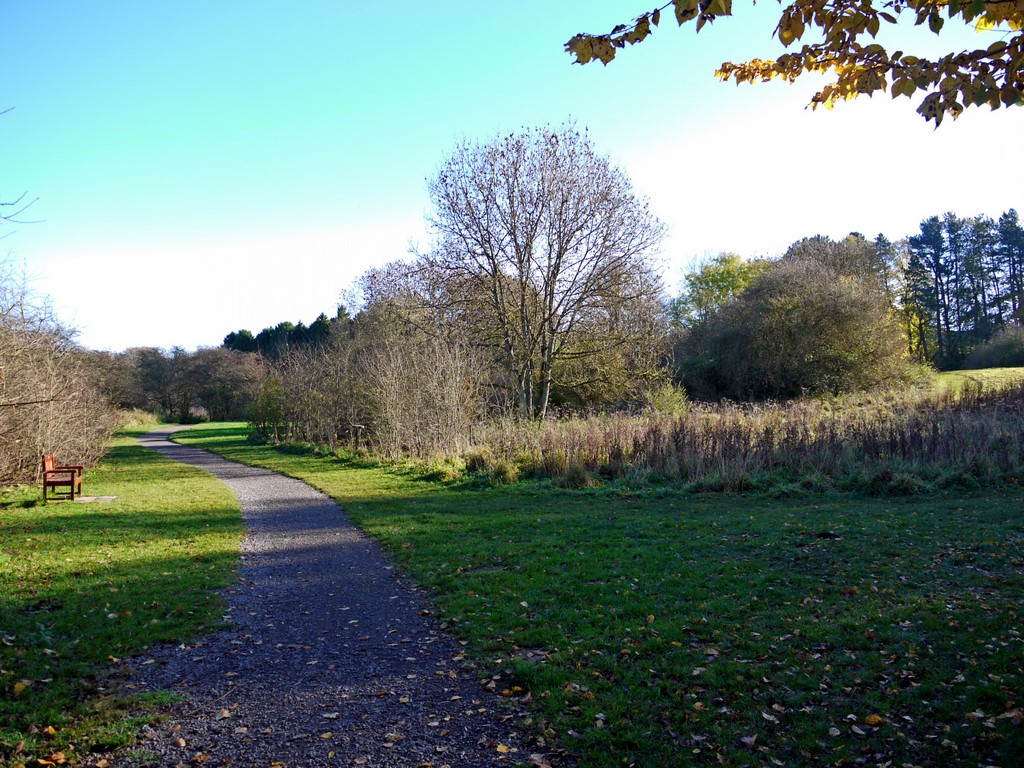
- Ponteland Park

- Location within Northumberland
- OS grid reference: NZ148711
- Civil parish: Ponteland
- Unitary authority: Northumberland
- Ceremonial county: Northumberland
- Region: North East
- Country: England
- Sovereign state: United Kingdom
- Post town: NEWCASTLE UPON TYNE
- Postcode district: NE20
- Dialling code: 01661
- Police: Northumbria
- Fire: Northumberland
- Ambulance: North East
- UK Parliament: Hexham

Darras Hall is an upland housing estate located in the village of Ponteland, in the civil parish of Ponteland, in Northumberland, England. It is on the southwestern outskirts of the village, 7.4 miles (11.9 km) northwest of Newcastle upon Tyne. It is generally regarded as the most expensive and exclusive place to live in the North East of England and is home to numerous celebrities, professional footballers and some of the region's most powerful business leaders.

== Geography ==
It is separated by a green buffer from Newcastle International Airport 1.5 miles (2.4 km) to the east and is one of the most affluent estates in North East England. It has very expensive housing stock as well as the most expensive road in the North East. Several former professional footballers including Alan Shearer, Peter Beardsley, and Terry McDermott live on the estate along with many current players from both Newcastle United and Sunderland.

Nearby villages include Heddon-on-the-Wall, Throckley, Westerhope, Gosforth and Hazlerigg. The village itself has shopping facilities at Broadway Shopping Centre with further retail available in Newcastle upon Tyne accessed via the A696 or by bus. The nearby airport has a railway station that links to the city centre.

== Demography ==
In the 21st century, a lot of building work has been done all over Darras Hall, rendering it largely unrecognisable from its former appearance. In times gone by, Darras Hall was replete with bungalows set in large sprawling and expansive grounds, many of which remain. The large plots are now being used to produce vast mansions, further adding to the exclusivity of Darras Hall.

Many of the gardens in Darras Hall still have evidence of being part of a grand house called Doris Hall. A cursory glance of most gardens will highlight the presence of various apple trees and plum trees, remnants of the old orchards that once sprawled the countryside. Red squirrels, prevalent across the county (Northumberland), make use of and live in trees in gardens of the estate.

The exclusivity of Darras Hall is, in part, regulated by the existence of the Darras Hall Committee. The committee are responsible for disputes among residents and also ensure that all houses are kept in good order, particularly as regard to compliance with minimum plot size, by occupants and third parties. A trust deed and byelaws affect much of the land, the latter explaining that in 1910, a group of landowners and businessmen created the concept of a residential estate to allow people to live in a more rural surrounding rather than in long streets of terraced houses and flats and that it is important to ensure the overall maintenance of the rural ambience. They are a separate regime to planning, which has its own policies.

The 2011 census reveals that the population has seen an increase since 2001 and generally more families. The density of the constituent output areas 33A, 33F, 34A and 34C mirrors urban and suburban areas, with plenty of green spaces and exceptionally in 33A (straying into a small part of the village), a three-year higher median age than in 2001 of 54 and a slightly high dependent dependency ratio of 1.2 and in old age 1.7. (Note: Number of people aged 16-64 for every person aged 0-16 and 65+) Most of the estate falls within 34C which has 1,464 people, a density of 580 per km^{2} and a median age of 48, one year less than 10 years ago.

== Civil parish ==
Darras Hall was a civil parish; in 1951 the parish had a population of 282. Darras Hall was formerly a township in Ponteland parish; from 1866 Darras Hall was a civil parish in its own right until it was abolished on 1 April 1955 and merged with Ponteland.

== Notes and references ==
Notes
