= South Gosforth Metro station =

Tyne and Wear Metro station in Newcastle upon Tyne

South Gosforth
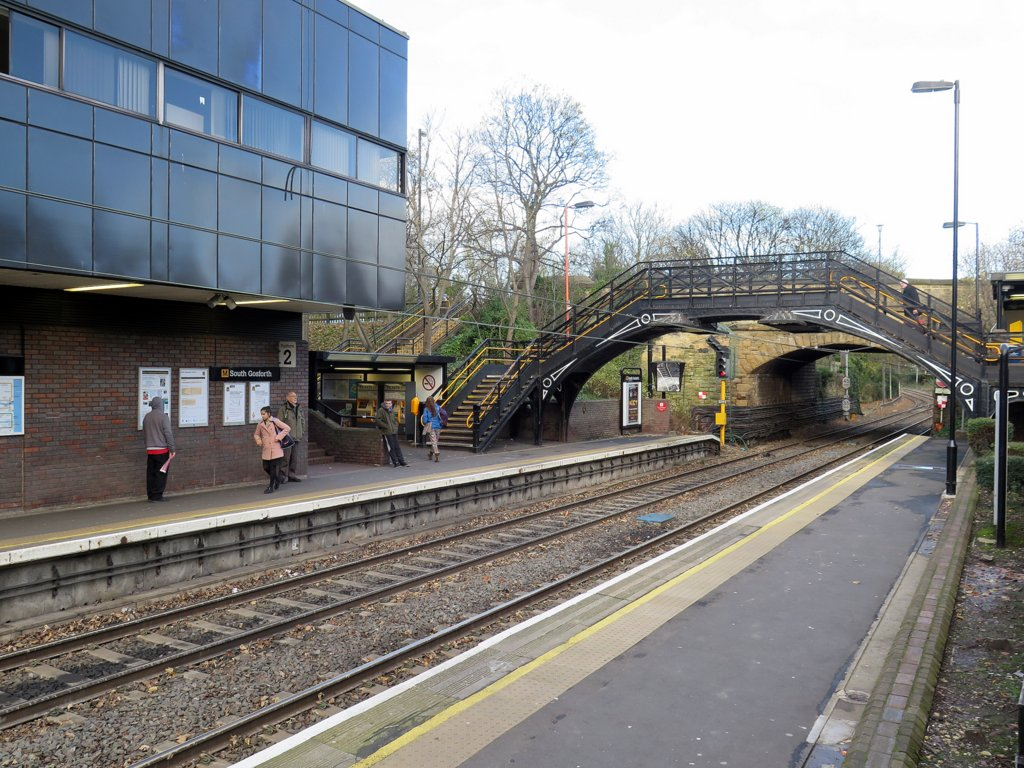
- Station platforms, with Metro control centre and historic NER footbridge

General information
- Location: Station Road, South Gosforth, NE3; Newcastle upon Tyne; England
- Coordinates: 55.0058°N 1.6083°W
- OS Grid ref: NZ 251 679
- System: Tyne and Wear Metro
- Owner: Nexus
- Lines: Green line; Yellow line
- Platforms: 2
- Tracks: 2

Construction
- Cycle facilities: 5 cycle pods, with space for 10 bikes
- Accessible: Step-free access to platforms, with level-boarding to Class 555 trains

Other information
- Status: Staffed intermittently
- Station code: SGF
- Fare zone: A and B

History
- Original company: Blyth and Tyne Railway
- Pre-grouping: North Eastern Railway
- Post-grouping: London and North Eastern Railway; British Rail (North Eastern Region); British Rail (Eastern Region)

Key dates
- 27 June 1864: Opened as Gosforth
- 1 March 1905: Renamed South Gosforth
- 23 January 1978: Closed for Metro conversion
- 11 August 1980: Reopened

Passengers
- 2020/21: ▼372,881
- 2021/22: ▲1.538 million
- 2022/23: ▲1.805 million
- 2023/24: ▲2.040 million
- 2024/25: ▲2.147 million

Services
Preceding station	Tyne and Wear Metro	Following station
Ilford Road towards South Hylton	Green line	Regent Centre towards Airport
Ilford Road towards South Shields	Yellow line	Longbenton towards St James via Whitley Bay
Location
- Location within Newcastle-upon-Tyne Location within Tyne and Wear
Notes
- Passenger statistics from Nexus.

South Gosforth is a Tyne and Wear Metro station, and former British Rail station, serving the suburb of South Gosforth in the English city of Newcastle upon Tyne. It originally opened on 27 June 1864, as part of the Blyth and Tyne Railway, and became part of the Tyne and Wear Metro on 11 August 1980. Above the station platform is the Metro control centre and offices of the Tyne and Wear Metro.

== History ==
The station was opened as Gosforth on 27 June 1864 by the Blyth and Tyne Railway, and it was acquired by the North Eastern Railway (NER) in 1874, along with the rest of the Blythe and Tyne Railway. The station had two side platforms, with entrances on both and linked by an NER style iron footbridge. The principal buildings were on the west side, together with a waiting room and second ticket office on the east side. A station master's house stood to the south of the principal building, and all the buildings were in red brick.

By the summer of 1896 the station had an irregular weekday service of a dozen steam trains a day, operating a near-circular route from Newcastle Central to Newcastle New Bridge Street via the coast. A further nine trains a day between New Bridge Street and the northern end of the Blyth and Tyne called at South Gosforth. Fewer services operated at weekends.

The line through the station was electrified, using a 600 V DC third rail system, and on 29 March 1904 a frequent electric service was initiated. Initially electric trains operated only from New Bridge Street to Benton station, but in stages, electrification was extended, and a new link into Newcastle Central was built, so that by 1909 services could run from Newcastle Central to Newcastle Central via the coast and Gosforth, thus creating the North Tyneside Loop.

Gosforth station was renamed South Gosforth on 1 March 1905, after the opening of the nearby West Gosforth on the Gosforth and Ponteland Light Railway. From then until that line closed to passengers on 17 June 1929, South Gosforth served as the terminus of trains on the Ponteland line, which left the Blyth and Tyne line just north of the station. Branch trains, which remained steam-hauled, were stabled on a loop line to the south-east of the station between services.

In 1967, the North Tyneside Loop was de-electrified, with the last electric train running on 17 June 1967. The replacement diesel trains provided a slower and less frequent service, and this loss was one of the driving factors for the eventual creation of the Tyne and Wear Metro.

The station closed on 23 January 1978 for conversion to the new system. Unlike most of the repurposed stations, this involved demolishing all the existing buildings, except for the footbridge, and the construction of a substantial new building on the western side of the station to house the Metro's control centre. The station reopened as part of the Tyne and Wear Metro on 11 August 1980, following the opening of the first phase of the network, between Haymarket and Tynemouth via Four Lane Ends Interchange.

== Facilities ==
The station has two side platforms, which are connected by an original NER footbridge; an almost-identical NER footbridge from Percy Main has been preserved by the National Railway Museum in York. Step-free access is available to both platforms via ramps from Station Road, which crosses above the northern end of the station and also provides step-free access between the platforms.

There is no car parking available at the station. There is provision for cycle parking, with five cycle pods available. The station is equipped with ticket machines, a waiting shelter, seating, next train information displays, timetable posters, and an emergency help point on both platforms.

The ticket machines accept credit and debit cards (including contactless payment), notes and coins. The station is also fitted with smartcard validators, which feature at all stations across the network.

The station houses the Metro Control Centre. It is responsible for operating the network's signalling and electrical supply, as well as being used to communicate with train drivers and other staff, using two-way radio equipment. The station is located near to the South Gosforth Depot, which maintains the metro's train fleet and is located in the triangle between South Gosforth, Longbenton and Regent Centre stations.

== Services ==
As of May 2026, the station is served by up to ten trains per hour – five trains in each direction on both of the Yellow and Green lines – on weekdays and Saturdays, and up to eight trains per hour during the evening and on Sundays. In the northbound direction, half the trains run to Newcastle Airport and half to St James via Whitley Bay. In the southbound direction, half the trains run to South Shields and half to South Hylton via Sunderland.
