= South Hylton Metro station =

Tyne and Wear Metro station in Sunderland

South Hylton
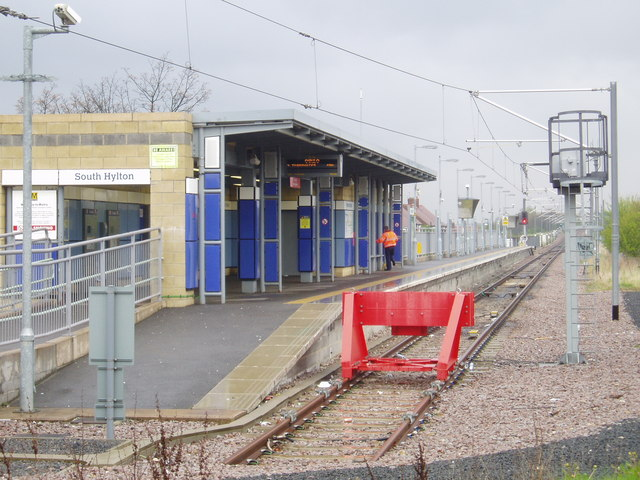

General information
- Location: South Hylton, City of Sunderland; England
- Coordinates: 54°54′15″N 1°26′52″W
- Grid reference: NZ354567
- System: Tyne and Wear Metro station
- Transit authority: Tyne and Wear PTE
- Platforms: 1
- Tracks: 1

Construction
- Parking: 24 spaces
- Cycle facilities: 5 cycle pods
- Accessible: Step-free access to platform

Other information
- Station code: SHL
- Fare zone: C

History
- Original company: York, Newcastle and Berwick Railway
- Pre-grouping: North Eastern Railway
- Post-grouping: London and North Eastern Railway; British Rail (Eastern Region)

Key dates
- 1 June 1853: Opened as Hylton
- 4 May 1964: Closed
- 31 March 2002: Resited and reopened as South Hylton

Passengers
- 2024/25: 0.282 million

Services
Preceding station	Tyne and Wear Metro	Following station
Terminus	Green line	Pallion towards Airport
Location
- Location within Sunderland Location within Tyne and Wear

South Hylton is a Tyne and Wear Metro station, serving the suburbs of Pennywell and South Hylton, City of Sunderland in Tyne and Wear, North East England. It joined the network as a terminus station on 31 March 2002, following the opening of the extension from Pelaw to South Hylton.

== History ==
=== Original station ===
South Hylton stands to the east of the site of the former Hylton station, which was located west of Hylton Bank. The station opened on 1 June 1853, as part of the Penshaw branch of the York, Newcastle and Berwick Railway. Passenger services along the Penshaw Branch were recommended for withdrawal in the Beeching Report, and the station duly closed on 4 May 1964.

Prior to the opening of the Tyne and Wear Metro station, the area was served by the Jolly Bus service, operated by W.H. Jolly. The service ran from Claxheugh Road and Evesham in South Hylton to Sunderland, using vehicles branded in a cream and brown livery. The service was withdrawn in July 1995.

=== Metro station ===
The new South Hylton station opened in 2002 and has the longest platform on the Tyne and Wear Metro network, with a length of 122 m (400 ft). Because of this, the single platform is officially recognised as two platforms, and can accommodate two trains.

Along with other stations on the line between Fellgate and South Hylton, the station is fitted with vitreous enamel panels designed by artist, Morag Morrison. Each station uses a different arrangement of colours, with strong colours used in platform shelters and ticketing areas, and a more neutral palate for external elements.

The station was used by 256,819 passengers in 2017–18, making it the eighth-most-used station on the Wearside extension.

== Facilities ==
Step-free access is available at all stations across the Tyne and Wear Metro network, with ramped access to the platform at South Hylton. The station is equipped with ticket machines, waiting shelter, seating, next train information displays, timetable posters, and an emergency help point. Ticket machines are able to accept payment with credit and debit card (including contactless payment), notes and coins. The station is also fitted with smartcard validators, which feature at all stations across the network.

A small, free car park is available, with 24 parking spaces, plus two accessible spaces, as well as a taxi rank. There is also the provision for cycle parking, with five cycle pods available for use.

== Services ==
As of April 2021, the station is served by up to five trains per hour on weekdays and Saturday, and up to four trains per hour during the evening and on Sunday.

== Future proposals ==
As part of Nexus' proposal to extend the Metro to Pelaw via the former Leamside line via Washington, the station would have a second platform built for trains towards Pelaw.
