= Newcastle Airport Metro station =

Tyne and Wear Metro station in Newcastle upon Tyne

Airport
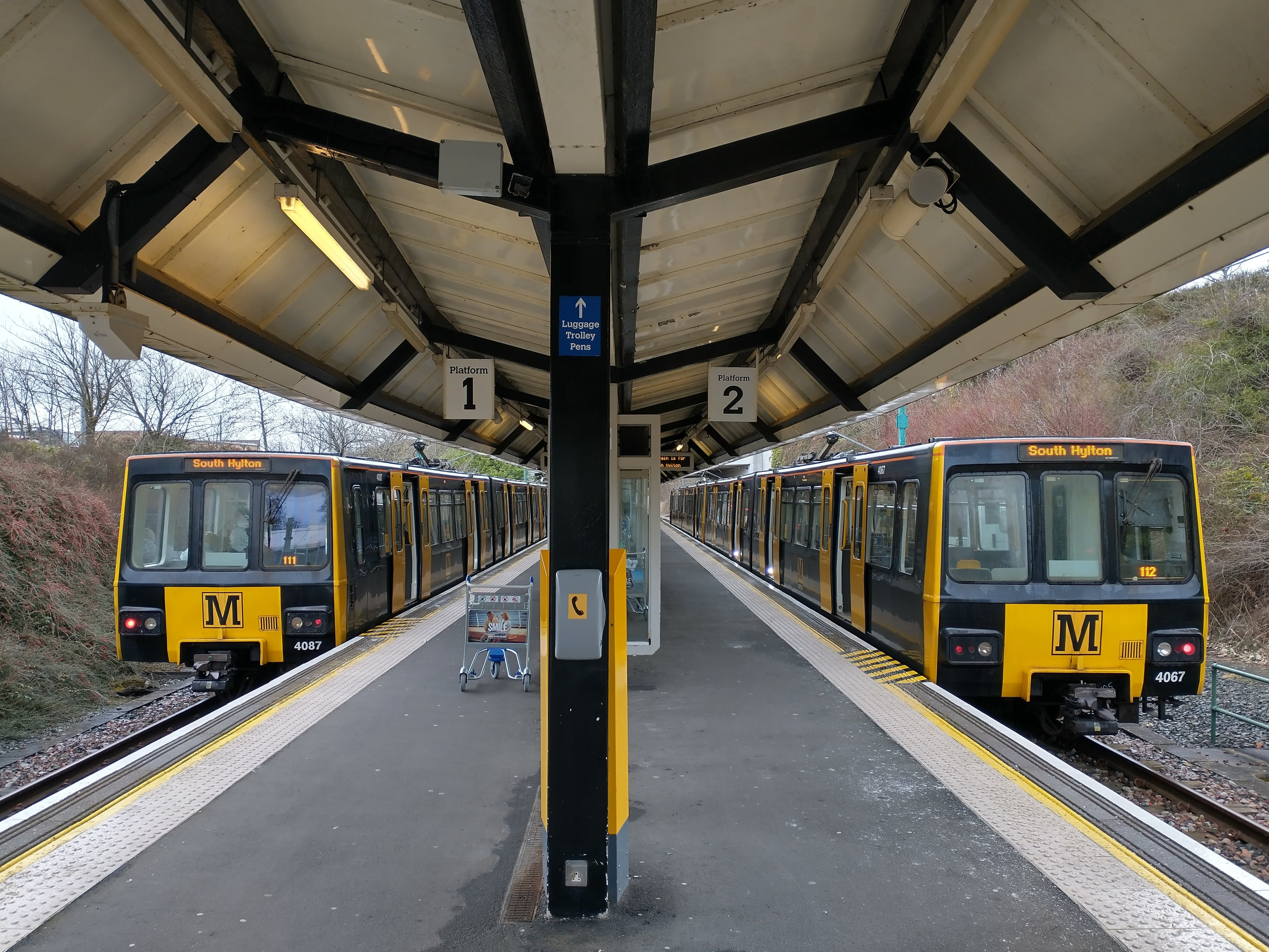

General information
- Location: Newcastle International Airport; NE13, Newcastle upon Tyne; England
- Coordinates: 55.0356°N 1.7110°W
- OS Grid ref: NZ 186 713
- System: Tyne and Wear Metro
- Owner: Nexus
- Line: Green line
- Platforms: 2
- Tracks: 2

Construction
- Accessible: Step-free access throughout, with level-boarding to trains

Other information
- Status: Staffed intermittently
- Station code: APT
- Fare zone: C

History
- Original company: Tyne and Wear Metro

Key dates
- 17 November 1991: Opened

Passengers
- 2020/21: ▼68,222
- 2021/22: ▲473,775
- 2022/23: ▲869,219
- 2023/24: ▲1.024 million
- 2024/25: ▲1.106 million

Services
Preceding station	Tyne and Wear Metro	Following station
Callerton Parkway towards South Hylton	Green line	Terminus
Location
- Location within Newcastle-upon-Tyne Location within Tyne and Wear
Notes
- Metro passenger statistics from Nexus.

Airport (also known as Newcastle Airport) is a Tyne and Wear Metro station, serving Newcastle International Airport in the English city of Newcastle upon Tyne. It opened as a terminus station in 1991, following the completion of the extension from Bank Foot.

== History ==
Construction of the extension of the Metro from Bank Foot to Newcastle Airport began in 1990, after funding had been secured from the European Economic Community. The majority of the route of the extension uses the alignment of the Ponteland Railway, with a short (around 0.2 miles or 0.32 kilometres) section of new right-of-way at the airport end. The Ponteland Railway opened in June 1905, closing to passenger services in June 1929, with goods services operating into the late 1960s.

During the construction of the line, dedicated bus route M77 operated between Bank Foot and Newcastle International Airport.

The extension and station opened on 17 November 1991, at a cost of £12 million. The new station at the airport had a pyramid design, and was linked to both platforms and the main airport terminal by covered walkways. As well as the airport station, a new intermediate station was built at Callerton Parkway, and a second platform was added to Bank Foot station.

In 2014, a survey conducted by the Consumers Association found that the Tyne and Wear Metro service from the Airport was one of the highest rated airport rail links in the country for customer satisfaction – scoring 85%. Only the rail link serving Birmingham Airport was rated higher.

The station was used by 1.106 million passengers in 2024/25, considerably higher than the pre-pandemic figure of 0.884 million in 2018/19.

== Facilities ==
The only access to the station is through the airport's main terminal building. Step-free covered walkways link the terminal building to the ticket hall, and the ticket hall to the station's island platform. There is no dedicated car or bicycle parking available at the station, with car parking controlled and operated by the airport. A taxi rank is located at the front of the terminal building.

The station is equipped with ticket machines, waiting shelter, seating, next train information displays, timetable posters, and an emergency help point on both platforms. Ticket machines accept payment with credit and debit cards (including contactless payment), notes and coins. The station is fitted with automatic ticket barriers, which were installed at 13 stations across the network during the early 2010s, as well as smartcard validators, which feature at all stations on the network.

== Services ==
As of May 2026, the station is served by up to five trains per hour on weekdays and Saturdays, and up to four trains per hour during the evening and on Sundays. Trains run southbound to South Hylton via Central Station and Sunderland. (Note: Prior to 12 December 2005, Green line services operated between South Shields and Newcastle Airport.)
