= Four Lane Ends Interchange =

Tyne and Wear Metro station and bus interchange in North Tyneside

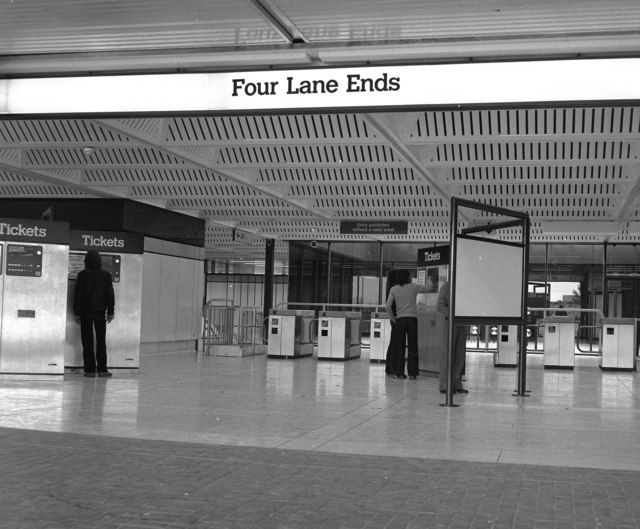
- Interchange concourse before redevelopment in 2004

General information
- Location: Benton Lane, Longbenton, NE7; North Tyneside; England
- Coordinates: 55.0101°N 1.5785°W
- OS Grid ref: NZ 271 685
- Elevation: 62 m (203 ft)
- System: Multimodal transport hub including Tyne and Wear Metro station
- Owner: Nexus
- Line: Yellow line
- Platforms: 2
- Tracks: 2
- Bus stands: 7 (A–G)
- Bus operators: Go North East; Stagecoach North East

Construction
- Parking: 475 spaces
- Cycle facilities: 5 cycle pods
- Accessible: Step-free access throughout, with lifts from street-level to platforms and level-boarding to trains

Other information
- Station code: FLE
- Fare zone: B

History
- Original company: Tyne and Wear Metro

Key dates
- 11 August 1980: Opened
- 2004: Interchange rebuilt

Passengers
- 2020/21: ▼120,876 (Tyne and Wear Metro)
- 2021/22: ▲515,881 (Tyne and Wear Metro)
- 2022/23: ▲654,740 (Tyne and Wear Metro)
- 2023/24: ▼625,442 (Tyne and Wear Metro)
- 2024/25: ▲692,126 (Tyne and Wear Metro)

Services
Preceding station	Tyne and Wear Metro	Following station
Longbenton towards South Shields	Yellow line	Benton towards St James via Whitley Bay
Location
- Location within Tyne and Wear
Notes
- Metro passenger statistics from Nexus.

Four Lane Ends Interchange is a multimodal transport hub in the borough of North Tyneside in the English metropolitan county of Tyne and Wear. It includes a station on the Tyne and Wear Metro, a bus station and a multi-storey car park. The metro station opened on 11 August 1980, but it is situated on the site of an earlier station that was open between 1864 and 1871.

The interchange serves the suburbs of Benton, Longbenton and High Heaton. Nearby employment sites include Benton Park View to the west, Tyneview Park to the south east, and Quorum Park to the north.

== History ==
The Blyth and Tyne Railway had a railway station on the site of Four Lane Ends Interchange, which opened with the line on 26 June 1864. It was relatively short-lived and closed on 1 March 1871, with the opening of a new station at Benton. It was variously referred to as Long Benton in its owner's timetables, as Longbenton on their map, and as Benton in Bradshaw's Guide. The last remains of this station disappeared during the construction of the metro interchange.

The current interchange opened on 11 August 1980 as part of the first phase of the Metro network, with services running between Haymarket and Tynemouth. The station is located at the junction of Benton Lane (A188), Benton Park Road (A191) and Front Street (A191). The crossroads has historically been important for traders, cattle drivers, and those transporting local salts and lime towards the shipyards and factories in Newcastle.

Unlike neighbouring Longbenton and Benton, Four Lane Ends was purpose-built for the Tyne and Wear Metro network. These purpose-built stations, such as Four Lane Ends, Heworth and Regent Centre, had a definite corporate look of rectangular blocks, light enamelled wall panels, and black roofing.

The interchange was redeveloped in 2004, to include a 475-space multi-storey car park, as well as improved passenger facilities. As part of the Metro: All Change programme, new lifts were installed at Four Lane Ends in 2012, with new escalators installed in 2015.

The Metro station was used by 692,126 passengers in 2024/25, considerably lower than the pre-pandemic figure of 933,414 in 2018/19.

== Facilities ==
The interchange comprises the metro station, a bus station, a taxi rank, and a multi-storey car park that has 457 spaces plus 22 accessible spaces. There is also the provision for cycle parking, with five cycle pods, and 18 cycle spaces. The interchange also houses a small number of shops and services, including a newsagents, sandwich shop, hairdressers and Amazon collection lockers. There are public and disabled toilet facilities.

The metro station is at the lowest level of the interchange, is fully covered by the buildings above, and has two side platforms. Step-free access is available, with lifts, as well as stairs and escalators, providing step-free access between the platforms and the interchange building above. Each platform is equipped with seating, next train information displays, timetable posters, and an emergency help point.

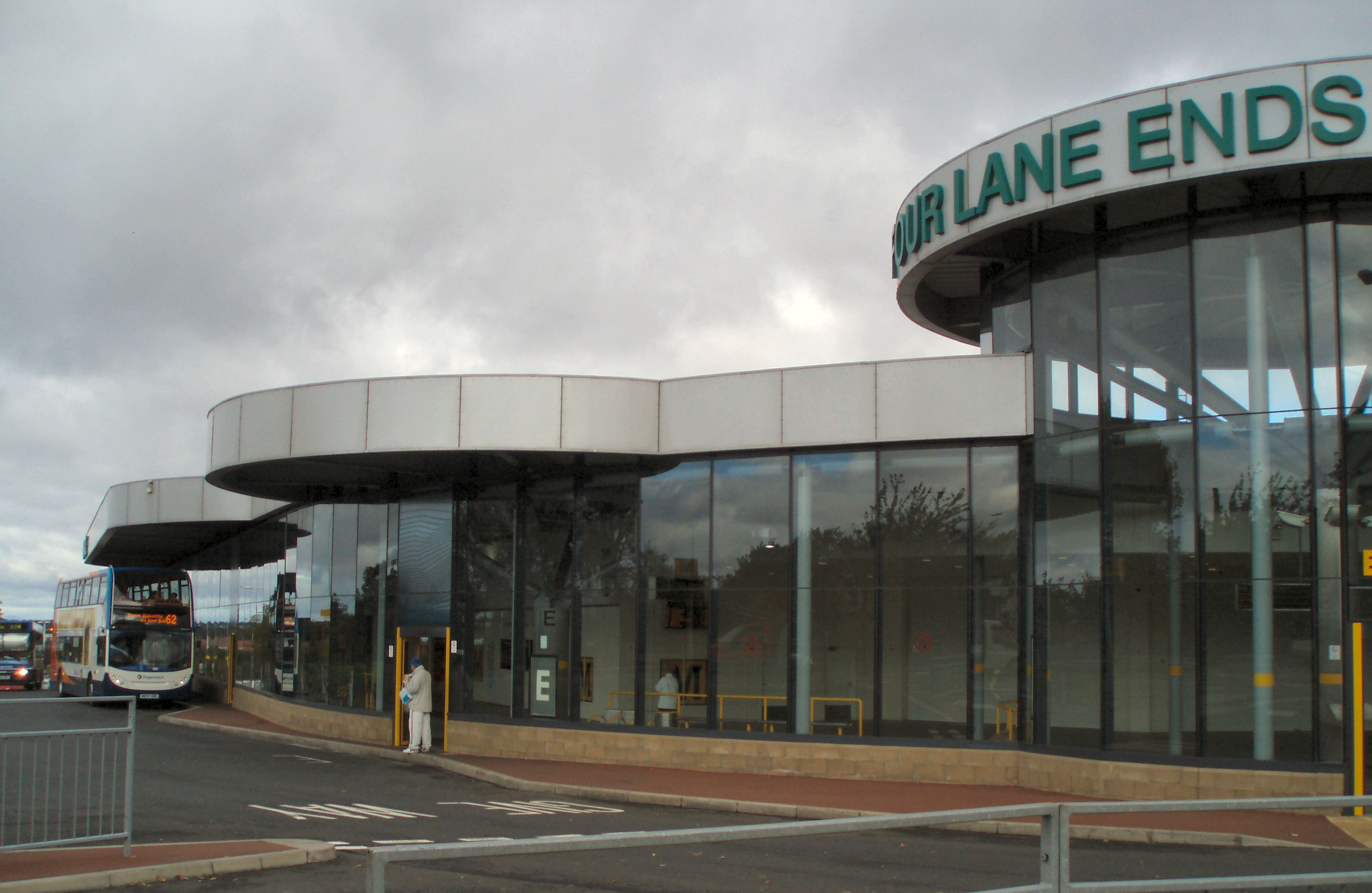
The 2004 redeveloped Four Lane Ends Interchange building

The interchange is equipped with ticket machines, which accept payment by credit and debit cards (including contactless payment), notes and coins. The interchange is also fitted with smartcard validators, which feature at all stations across the network.

== Metro services ==
As of May 2026, the station is served by up to five trains per hour – in each direction – on weekdays and Saturdays, and up to four trains per hour during the evening and on Sundays. In the eastbound direction, trains run to St James via Whitley Bay. In the westbound direction, trains run to South Shields via Newcastle City Centre and Gateshead. (Note: From the opening of the Sunderland extension in March 2002, the Yellow line ran from St James to South Hylton. In December 2005, the southern branches were swapped, with the Yellow line running to South Shields instead of the Green line, which then operated between Newcastle Airport and South Hylton)

== Bus services ==
The bus station is located above the metro station and surrounding the interchange building. It is served by Go North East and Stagecoach North East's local bus services – plus independent operators operating Nexus contracted routes – with frequent services serving Newcastle upon Tyne and North Tyneside. The bus station has seven departure stands (lettered A–G), each of which is fitted with seating, next bus information displays, and timetable posters.

As of June 2026, the stand allocation is:

Stand	Route	Destination
A	Metro replacement bus via Benton	
A	Special services to Newcastle Racecourse	
B	18	Quorum Park (Note: Peak-time journey(s) only.) or Benton Estate (Note: Off-peak journeys only.) via Benton Lane, or Goathland Avenue & Hailsham Avenue
B	38	Forest Hall via Goathland Avenue & Meadway
B	335	Killingworth via Stoneleigh Avenue, Balliol Business Park, Quorum Park & West Moor
C	62	Killingworth via Balliol Business Park, Quorum Park, Great Lime Road & West Bailey
C	63	Killingworth via Goathland Avenue, Forest Hall Drive, Great Lime Road & East Bailey
D	18 (Note: Some journeys also operate via the Longbenton BT Call Centre.)	Walker via Stoneleigh Avenue, (Note: Mon-Sat daytime journeys.), Longbenton Shops, (Note: Evening and Sunday journeys.) Freeman Hospital, High Heaton, Byker, St Peter's Basin & St Anthony's
D	37	Cramlington via Quorum Park, Killingworth, Burradon & Dudley
D	352	Cramlington via Quorum Park, Killingworth, Burradon & Dudley
D	354	North Shields Interchange via Quorum Park, Killingworth, Shiremoor, Silverlink & Billy Mill
E	37	Whickham View via Freeman Hospital, High Heaton, Sandyford, Newcastle City Centre, Central Station , Arthurs Hill, CAV Campus & Benwell Village
E	38	Whickham View via Freeman Hospital, High Heaton, Sandyford, Newcastle City Centre, Central Station , Arthurs Hill, CAV Campus & Benwell Village
E	352	Haymarket via Freeman Hospital, High Heaton & Sandyford
E	354	Haymarket via South Gosforth & Gosforth High Street
F	62	Throckley via Heaton, Byker, Newcastle City Centre, Cowgate, Slatyford, West Denton, Chapel Park, Walbottle & Newburn
F	63	Middle Callerton via Heaton, Byker, Newcastle City Centre, Fenham Hall Drive, Silver Lonnen, Slatyford, West Denton, Chapel Park, & Balsam Way
G	335	Hadrian Park via Front Street, Benton Asda, Hadrian Lodge, High Farm & Battle Hill
G	Metro replacement bus via South Gosforth	

- Key:
- Bus station
- National Rail station
- Tyne & Wear Metro station

== Artworks ==
Four Lane Ends houses two art installations, both of which were commissioned in the early 2000s.

- Andrew Stonyer's Pulse (2000) features in the station's courtyard, adjacent to the ticket concourse, and consists of a 6 m (20 ft) diameter corten steel ring, with a circle of bright neon red.
- Cath Campbell's Detour (2003) features on the south and west elevations of the station's multi-storey car park, creating an "animated" and "dynamic" surface, describing movement and journeys through space.
