= Longbenton =

District of North Tyneside, England

Coordinates: 55.00°N 1.57°W

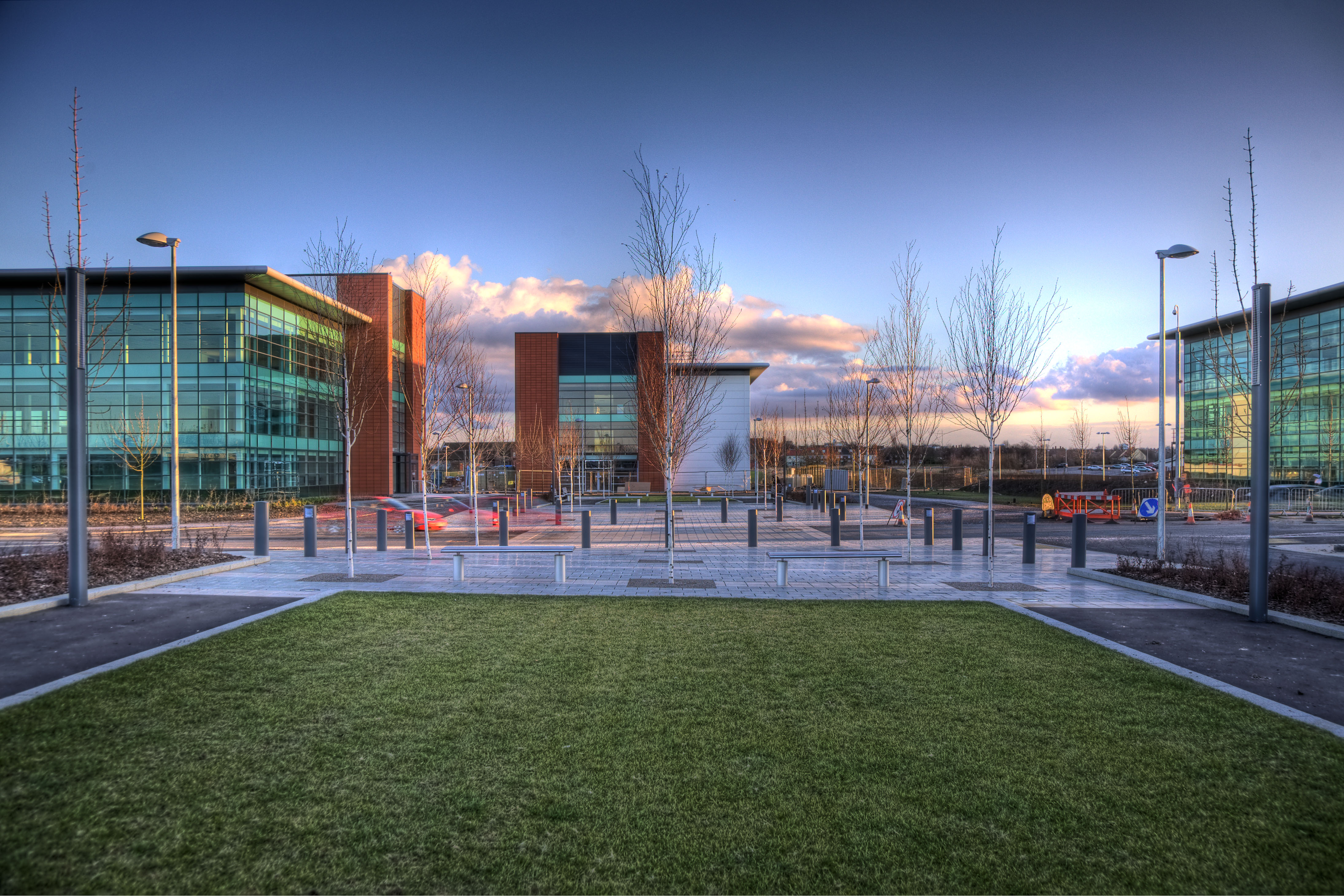
- Quorum Business Park situated in North of Longbenton

- Location within Tyne and Wear
- Population: 10,617 (2011 Ward)
- OS grid reference: NZ2668
- Metropolitan borough: North Tyneside
- Metropolitan county: Tyne and Wear
- Region: North East
- Country: England
- Sovereign state: United Kingdom
- Post town: NEWCASTLE UPON TYNE
- Postcode district: NE12
- Dialling code: 0191
- Police: Northumbria
- Fire: Tyne and Wear
- Ambulance: North East
- UK Parliament: North Tyneside

Longbenton is a district of North Tyneside, in the county of Tyne and Wear, England. It is largely occupied by an extensive estate originally built as municipal housing by Newcastle City Council in the 1930s and extended in the 1950s. It is served by the Tyne and Wear Metro stations Longbenton Metro station and Four Lane Ends Metro Station. Nearby places are Killingworth, Forest Hall, Four Lane Ends, West Moor, Heaton and South Gosforth, in Newcastle upon Tyne. The Longbenton and Killingworth Urban Area had a population of 34,878 in 2001. This figure increased to 37,070 in 2011.

== History ==
The name Longbenton probably means "long (i.e. large) bean town", to distinguish it from the smaller village of Little Benton to its south-east.

Longbenton has a long history of coal mining. Meadow Pit, Dyke Pit and First and Second Engine Pits were in operation by 1749. In 1774 an "experimentally-determined" model of the Newcomen atmospheric engine, designed by John Smeaton, was installed there. It was rated at 40 horsepower and used for drainage. In the 1860s Long Benton or Benton Colliery stood at OS grid reference NZ 27093 67438, where Benton Road crossed the Coxlodge Waggonway, a site now occupied by housing on Ferndene Grove.

== Transport ==
Coal was exported from Longbenton via the Coxlodge Waggonway to the Coxlodge Staithes on the Tyne at Wallsend. Later, between 1901 and 1930, much of the route was converted into a tram line operated by the Tyneside Tramways and Tramroads Company.

== Demography ==
Longbenton had a population of 10,617 in 2011. The figure is given as a ward because the Longbenton Urban Subdivision also encompasses its larger neighbour, Killingworth as well as parts of neighbouring areas. Details are as follows:

| Ethnic Groups 2011 | Longbenton ward | Metropolitan Borough of North Tyneside |
|---|---|---|
| White British | 92.6% | 95.1% |
| Asian | 3.5% | 1.9% |
| Black | 0.7% | 0.4% |

== Education ==
Two secondary schools are located in the township, Longbenton Community College and St Mary's Catholic School, Newcastle upon Tyne, along with four primary schools. The four primary schools are Benton Dene Primary School, Balliol Primary School, St Bartholomew's, and St. Stephen's Primary School. Nurseries offering childcare in Longbenton include Leigh's Nurseries.

Longbenton Football Club is an FA-affiliated team and as of 2012/13 season play in the Northern Alliance Division 2.

== Churches ==
Longbenton is served by St. Mary Magdalene (Church of England) on West Farm Ave, the Methodist church at one end of Chesters Ave and The King's Castle (independent) at the other end of Chesters Avenue.

The parish church is St Bartholomew's Church, Long Benton.

== Business ==
Longbenton is the site of BT's Newcastle call centre. Balliol Business Park is located in Longbenton where a Greggs production site and, until recently, two large Sitel call centres were located. Ken Bell International, a frozen meat and seafood exporter, had its largest production facility within the district. The UK production site for the Findus frozen food brand was based in Longbenton until mid-January 2009 when, through cost-cutting and fire damage, the factory was closed, with the loss of around 400 jobs. Following the award of a grant from Regional development agency One North East the factory was repaired and reopened as Longbenton Foods in 2010.

== Government agencies ==
HM Revenue & Customs and Department for Work and Pensions share a major base on the Longbenton/City of Newcastle upon Tyne border, known as Benton Park View.

== Notable residents ==
Footballer Peter Beardsley grew up in Longbenton and attended Longbenton High School.

Thomas Addison, 19th-century physician and scientist and discoverer of, among others, Addison's disease and Pernicious anaemia, was born and educated in Longbenton. He is widely regarded as one of the leading lights of 19th-century medicine, and was famous for his brilliant lecturing style, compassion and empathy for patients (not common among doctors at the time) and devotion to furthering medical science. He has a bust in his old place of work, Guy's Hospital, London.

Writer and poet Michael Roberts lived nearby in Jesmond in the 1930s, and he included Longbenton in his poem Hymn to the Sun.
