= Longbenton Metro station =

Tyne and Wear Metro station in North Tyneside

Longbenton
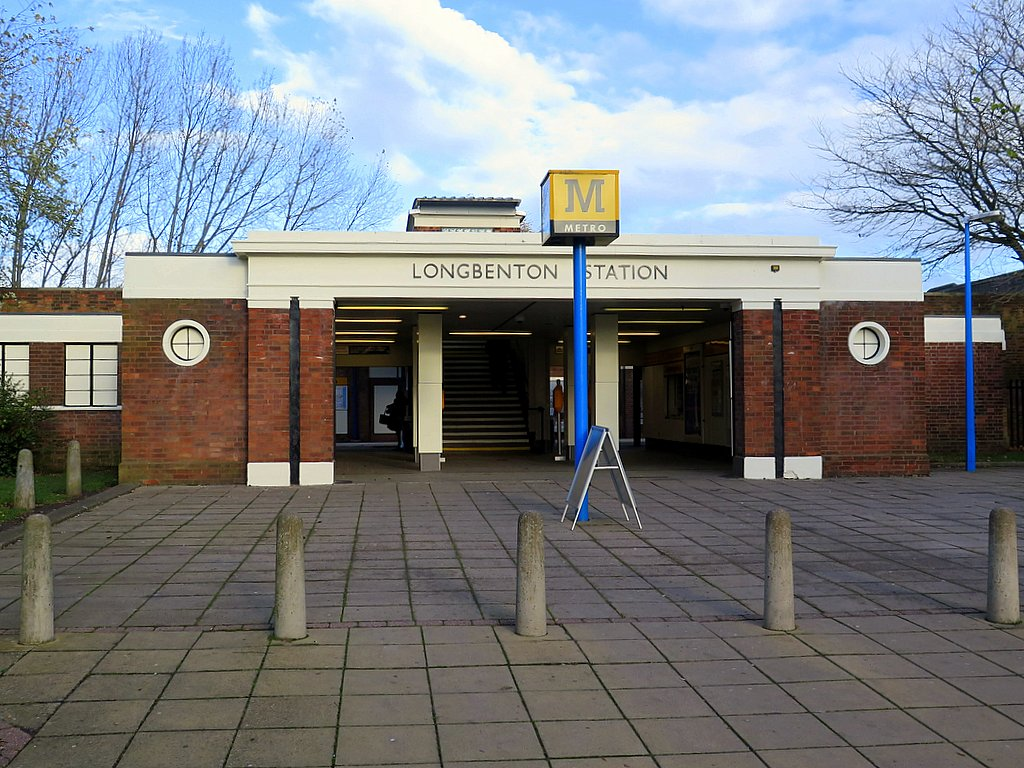
- The main (southern) entrance to the station on Lealholm Road in Newcastle.

General information
- Location: Lealholm Road, Longbenton, Newcastle upon Tyne / North Tyneside NE7; England
- Coordinates: 55.0089°N 1.5916°W
- OS Grid ref: NZ 262 683
- Elevation: 57 m (187 ft)
- System: Tyne and Wear Metro
- Owner: Nexus
- Line: Yellow line
- Platforms: 2
- Tracks: 2

Construction
- Structure type: Surface level
- Cycle facilities: 5 cycle pods
- Accessible: Step-free access throughout, with level-boarding to trains
- Architectural style: Neoclassical

Other information
- Status: Staffed intermittently
- Station code: LBN
- Fare zone: B

History
- Original company: London and North Eastern Railway
- Post-grouping: British Rail (North Eastern Region); British Rail (Eastern Region)

Key dates
- 14 July 1947: Opened by LNER
- 23 January 1978: Closed for Metro conversion
- 11 August 1980: Re-opened as a Metro station

Passengers
- 2020/21: ▼249,034
- 2021/22: ▲622,317
- 2022/23: ▲932,472
- 2023/24: ▼847,663
- 2024/25: ▲914,340

Services
Preceding station	Tyne and Wear Metro	Following station
South Gosforth towards South Shields	Yellow line	Four Lane Ends towards St James via Whitley Bay
Location
- Location within Tyne and Wear
Notes
- Passenger statistics from Nexus.

Longbenton Metro station is a Tyne and Wear Metro station, and former British Rail station, in the English metropolitan county of Tyne and Wear. It was originally opened on 14 July 1947 by the London and North Eastern Railway, and after conversion work, re-opened as part of phase 1 of the Metro network on 11 August 1980.

The railway at this point forms the boundary between the city of Newcastle upon Tyne and the borough of North Tyneside, with the southern entrance to the station in Newcastle and the northern entrance in North Tyneside. The station serves the government offices at Benton Park View and the Freeman Hospital, both in Newcastle, and the North Tyneside suburb of Longbenton.

== History ==
The line through Longbenton was opened in 1864 by the Blyth and Tyne Railway, but no station was provided at this location. An earlier station, variously named Benton, Long Benton and Longbenton, was located on the site of today's Four Lane Ends Interchange. That station opened with the line in 1864 and closed in 1871, when it was replaced by the current Benton station.

By the mid-1940s, the line was part of the London and North Eastern Railway's North Tyneside Loop, carrying a 600 V DC third rail electric service known as the Tyneside Electrics. At the time, the government was planning the construction of new offices for the Ministry of National Insurance in the area and requested that a new station be provided to improve access.

The station was opened on 14 July 1947. The original station building was constructed in dull red brick to the neoclassical style, described by railway architecture historian, Bill Fawcett, to have been influenced by Charles Holden's station designs for the London Underground. At first, there was no entrance on the northern side, access to that platform was gained via the level crossing on Vicar's Lane. It wasn't until the Longbenton Estate began construction in the mid-1950s that an entrance was added on the northern side. It was joined by a covered concrete footbridge and waiting rooms in about 1958, all of which were frequent targets for vandals by the 1970s.

Following closure for conversion to the Tyne and Wear Metro on 23 January 1978, a number of alterations were made to the station, including the shortening of platforms, construction of a new footbridge with spiral ramps to improve accessibility, and installation of new signage and ticket machines. It re-opened on 11 August 1980, as part of the first phase of the Metro network between Haymarket and Tynemouth via Four Lane Ends.

After the initial conversion work, the station buildings remained largely unchanged until 1999, when extensive refurbishment work took place. A new ticket hall was added on the eastbound platforms, and related aesthetic changes were made to the original footbridge. The 1940s station building on the westbound platforms of the station was also upgraded and refurbished.

The station was used by 914,340 passengers in 2024/25, considerably lower than the pre-pandemic figure of 1.39 million in 2019/20.

== Facilities ==
The station has two side platforms, with separate step-free access to both. The westbound platform has level access from Lealholm Road, whilst the eastbound platform is accessed by a footpath and ramp from Chesters Avenue. There is a stepped footbridge between the platforms within the station, and an external ramped footbridge at the eastern end. There is no dedicated car parking available at the station. There is provision for cycle parking, with five cycle pods on the north side of the station.

The station is equipped with ticket machines, waiting shelter, seating, next train information displays, timetable posters, and an emergency help point on both platforms. Ticket machines are able to accept payment with credit and debit card (including contactless payment), notes and coins. The station is also fitted with smartcard validators, which feature at all stations across the network.

A small newsagent's shop is housed within the station building, on platform 1 (trains towards South Shields).

== Artwork ==
Longbenton station features two installations from Metro's 'Art on Transport' programme.

In 1999, Journey's Echo, a collection of artwork created in collaboration with sixth-form students from the nearby St Mary's School.

The station is also home to Tag-Tile, an artwork commissioned in 2001, designed by Rob Belilios and Simon Jones. It was created with the involvement of local young people, in response to graffiti issues at the station.

== Services ==
As of May 2025, the station is served by up to five trains per hour – in each direction – on weekdays and Saturdays, and up to four trains per hour during the evening and on Sunday. In the eastbound direction, trains run to St James via Whitley Bay and Wallsend. In the westbound direction, trains run to South Shields via Newcastle City Centre and Gateshead.
