= Tyneview Park =

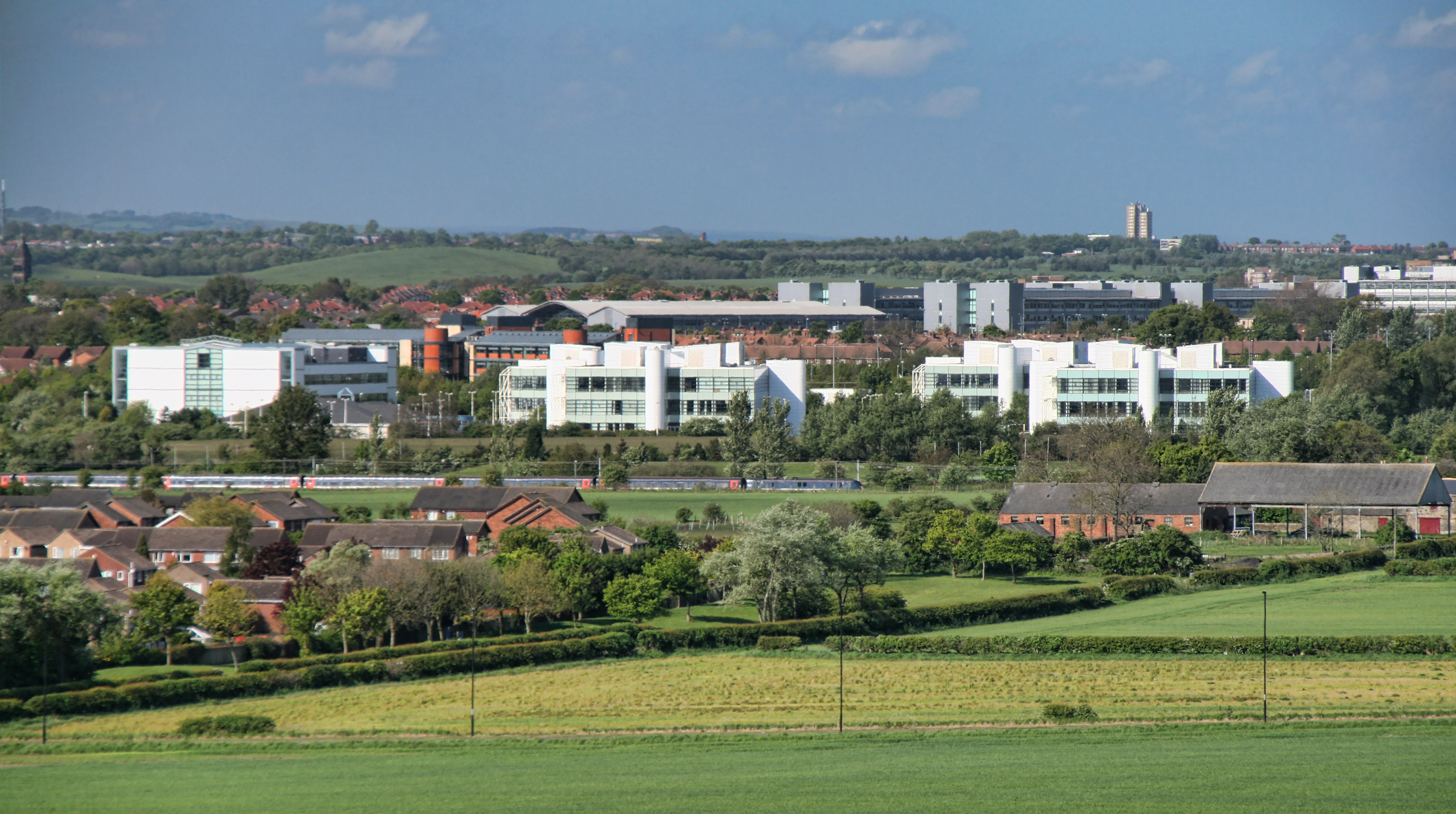
- Government buildings at Tyneview Park seen from the Rising Sun Country Park

- Location in Tyne and Wear

General information
- Location: Tyne and Wear, England, UK
- Coordinates: 55.014°N 1.587°W
- OS grid: NZ265689

Tyneview Park is a large government office site in Benton, Newcastle upon Tyne, England. Tyneview Park is home to many departments of The Pension Service, a sector of the Department for Work and Pensions and HMRC.

== Site ==
Basic layout of Tyneview Park, Newcastle upon Tyne

Built in the early 1990s and opened in 1995, the site is set back from Whitley Road, a major route through Benton with an access road leading south from Whitley Road into the main site. Initially, the site consisted of four main office blocks (lettered A - D) with a crèche facility and a restaurant block (with a small gymnasium). Each of the four office blocks is identical in structure. With three floors in total, each floor has office space to the north and south of the building, leaving a three-storey open space, known as an 'atrium'. These atria spanned the whole building, with glass windows on the roof and semi-darkened glass to the sides of the office spaces on each floor. Inside the atria, seating areas can be found along with vending machines. Stairs and lifts to the floors could be found to the east and west of each building. In 2002, work started on a new large building to the south of the site, which would house the new 'London Pension Centre', which would be known as 'J Block'. This new building was slightly different from its A - D predecessors, although having an atrium itself, it differed from the other blocks by having open office space looking onto the atria rather than having glass walls. The building opened in 2004. In 1996, Tyneview Park was awarded the 'Quality in Urban Design' award by the Royal Town Planning Institute.

Much of Tyneview park is a modernisation of the former Ministry of National Insurance site that began development on fields and part of the former RAF Longbenton site. The site borders on the Coach Lane Campus of Northumbria University to the west, the 'Blue Flames' clubhouse to the north east and the Newcastle United F.C. training ground to the south. The East Coast Main Line can be found to the east of the site also, with the Newcastle to Edinburgh stretch of the line.

== Departments at Tyneview Park ==
Tyneview Park is made up of departments solely from The Pension Service with centrally based 'centres' located here, supporting the network of regional Pension Centres across the country. The main centres at Tyneview Park are:

- Future Pension Centre (FPC) provides state pension forecasts for people approaching retirement age.
- National Pension Centre (NPC) deals with change of circumstances and enquiries regarding pension payments into bank accounts.
- Pension Tracing Service (PTS) helps track old pensions and pension schemes.
- International Pension Centre (IPC) deals with all enquiries regarding the payment of state pension, bereavement benefits, incapacity benefits and other such benefits for those living abroad.
- London Pension Centre (LPC) Services London and the surrounding areas as a standard Pension Centre

== Benton Park View ==
Tyneview Park was built as a satellite site of a larger government office site, approximately a mile west, in Longbenton called Benton Park View. Benton Park View does house a few The Pension Service departments; however this site is predominantly a HM Revenue and Customs site.

== See also ==
- Department for Work and Pensions
- Benton Park View
