= LBCC =

LBCC may refer to:

- Linn-Benton Community College
- Long Beach City College
- Longbenton Community College
