= Quorum Park =

English business park

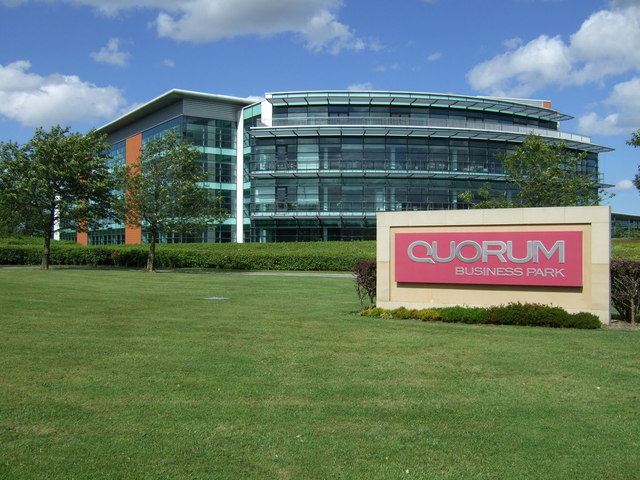
- Quorum Park entrance in 2013

- Location in Tyne and Wear, England
- Interactive map of Quorum Park
- Location: North Tyneside
- Coordinates: 55.0214°N 1.5799°W
- Public transit: Free bus travel to Four Lane Ends interchange with the Quorum App
- Website: www.quorumpark.com

Quorum Park, formerly Quorum Business Park, is an office development located in North Tyneside, North East England.

== History ==
Quorum was a part of the North Tyneside Enterprise Zone that existed from 1996 to 2006. The site originally housed Viasystems, a major semiconductor manufacturing plant. Following the closure of the plant, the current owners purchased the site and transformed it into a business park. Tritax provided funding for the development, with construction managed by Grantside, both serving as joint venture partners in the business park.

By 2010, Quorum sold 260,000 sq ft (24,000 m^{2}) of office space shared between six companies, most notably Tesco Bank and Balfour Beatty. British Engines relocated to Quorum their central core services teams in December 2013. In August 2014, Cofely, a building and energy services company, moved into a 26,000 sqft office building. In 2016, Greggs relocated its head office from Jesmond to Quorum Park. In November 2019, Shelborne Asset Management acquired a significant portion of the park for £32 million. As part of the acquisition, the park underwent rebranding in 2020 to enhance its image.

== Operation ==
In 2009, Quorum introduced a Q-card offering local discounts on food and leisure. It operates sports clubs, which provide office workers with free access to football, tennis, or netball. Additionally, there is a PureGym, shops, Greggs bakery, cafe, and a nursery.

== Public transport ==
Several bus routes operate via Quorum.

Bus routes from Quorum Business Park, as of May 2026
Route	Operator	Destination	Destination
18 (Note: Peak-time journeys only.)	Stagecoach North East		Walker
54A (Note: Evenings and Sunday only.)	Go North East	Whitley Bay	Haymarket
37	Stagecoach North East	Cramlington	Wickham View via Newcastle City Centre
62	Stagecoach North East	Killingworth	Throckley via Newcastle City Centre
63	Stagecoach North East	Killingworth	Middle Callerton via Newcastle City Centre
335	Nexus Bus	Killingworth	Hadrian Park
352	Go North East	Cramlington	Haymarket
354	Go North East	North Shields	Haymarket

All these routes serve the Tyne and Wear Metro interchange at Four Lane Ends.

Free bus travel is available for journeys between Quorum and Four Lane Ends interchange with the Quorum App for employees of companies based in the park.

The park encourages cycling among onsite staff, offering free cycle servicing and cycle hire.
