= Forest Hall railway station (Blyth and Tyne Railway) =

Disused railway station in Forest Hall, Tyne and Wear

Forest Hall

General information
- Location: Forest Hall; North Tyneside; Tyne and Wear; England
- Coordinates: 55.017442°N 1.557384°W
- Grid reference: NZ284693

Other information
- Status: Abandoned

History
- Original company: Blyth and Tyne Railway

Key dates
- 27 June 1864: Opened
- 1 March 1871: Closed
Location
- Location within Tyne and Wear

Forest Hall, also known as Foresthall, was a short-lived railway station on the Blyth and Tyne Railway, serving the village of Forest Hall in the borough of North Tyneside, Tyne and Wear, England. It was opened on 27 June 1864, along with the Blyth and Tyne's branch to Newcastle New Bridge Street station. It was closed on 1 March 1871, along with the opening of the railway's relocated Benton station some 0.5 miles (0.80 km) to the west.

It should not be confused with the nearby Forest Hall station on the East Coast Main Line, which was known as Benton station until 1874, after this station had closed.

Nothing remains of the former station, which had a station building on its south-eastern (up) platform. The Benton south-east curve, opened in 1904 to link the East Coast Main Line with the Blyth and Tyne, cut through the site of the station.
