= Terry Moran (British civil servant) =

British civil servant and public administrator (born 1960)

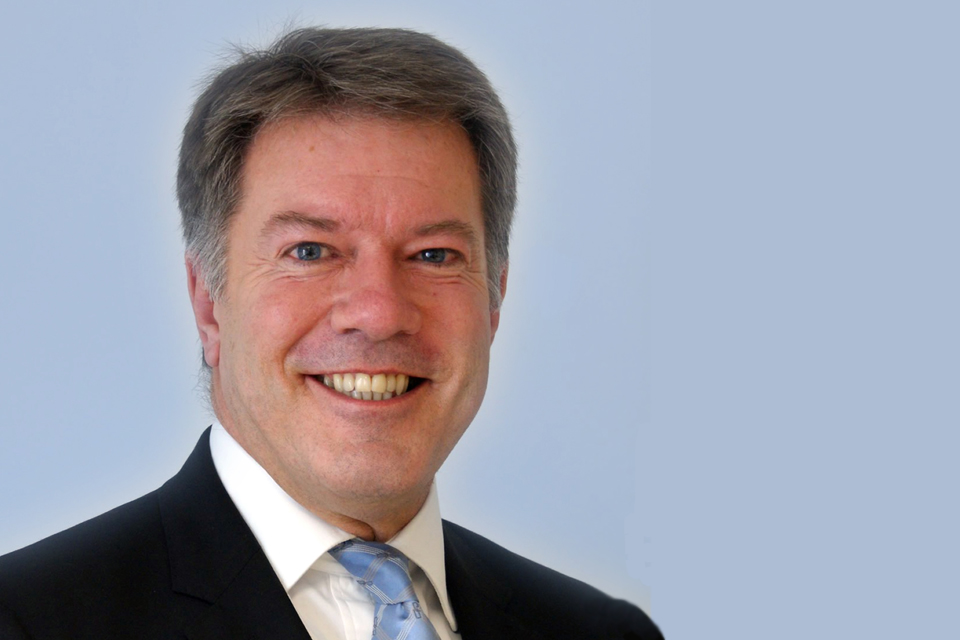

Second permanent secretary in the Department for Work and Pensions
- In office 2012–2013

Chief executive of the Pension, Disability and Carers Service
- In office 2008–2010

Chief executive of the Disability and Carers Service
- In office 2004–2007

Personal details
- Born: Terence Anthony Moran; 1960 (age 64–65)
- Occupation: Civil servant, public administrator

Terence Anthony Moran, CB (born 1960) is a British civil servant and public administrator. He was the Second Permanent Secretary in the Department for Work and Pensions (2012–13) and chief executive of the Disability and Carers Service (2004–07) and its successor, the Pension, Disability and Carers Service (2008–10).

== Career ==
=== Early career ===
Born in 1960 into a working-class family from Rotherham, Moran joined HM Civil Service straight after finishing at a comprehensive school in 1977. He started work in a clerical role in the Department of Health and Social Security, but was eventually promoted into "delivery roles", before spending time working on policy; he was private secretary to Sir Nick Montagu (1990–91) and Sir Michael Bichard (1992–96). Moran eventually become an area manager in the Benefits Agency in 2001, before being appointed a regional director in Jobcentre Plus (which replaced the Benefits Agency) in 2002.

=== Senior civil servant ===
In 2004, he was appointed chief executive of the newly formed Disability and Carers Service; in the first year, he was paid a salary of £105,000–110,000. In July 2007, he moved to The Pension Service to succeed Alexis Cleveland as interim chief executive, serving until April 2008 when the agency was merged with the Disability and Carers Service into the Pension, Disability and Carers Service; he then became the chief executive of that agency, serving until November 2010. According to The Daily Telegraph, in 2010 he was earning between £155,000–159,000 a year in this role.

After leaving his post at the Pension, Disability and Carers Service, he served as Director-General, Universal Credit, in the Department for Work and Pensions (DWP) until December 2011, and thereafter was the DWP's chief operating officer (COO) at director-general grade until March 2013; this coincided with his appointment as the department's Second Permanent Secretary from July 2012 to March 2013. During his time as COO, Moran publicly complained that doubts over the development of the programme were demoralising staff. He also attracted media attention for suggesting that he would like to publicly shame fraudulent benefit claimants, saying that "If I had my way I would put their photograph[s] on every lamp-post in the street where they live".

Moran was placed on sick leave in late 2012; in 2016, he wrote about this period in The Guardian to raise awareness about mental health. He retired from the civil service in March 2013.

=== Post-retirement ===
Between 2014 and 2017, Moran was a non-executive director of the Hull University Teaching Hospitals NHS Trust; he was then appointed chairman for two years ending March 2019.

== Honours and awards ==
Moran was appointed a Companion of the Order of the Bath (CB) in the 2007 Birthday Honours.

Government offices
Preceded by Agency created	Chief Executive, Disability and Carers Service; 2004–July 2007	Succeeded by Vivien Hopkins (acting)
Preceded by Alexis Cleveland	Chief Executive, The Pension Service (acting); July 2007–April 2008	Succeeded by Himself (as Chief Executive, Pension, Disability and Carers Service)
Preceded by Himself (as Chief Executive, The Pension Service)	Chief Executive, Pension, Disability and Carers Service; April 2008–November 2010	Succeeded by Vivien Hopkins (acting until agency abolished in 2011)
Preceded by Vivien Hopkins (as acting Chief Executive, Disability and Carers Service)	Chief Executive, Pension, Disability and Carers Service; April 2008–November 2010	Succeeded by Vivien Hopkins (acting until agency abolished in 2011)
Preceded by Position established	Director-General, Universal Credit; Department for Work and Pensions; December 2010–October 2011	Succeeded by Howard Shiplee
Preceded by None	Chief Operating Officer, Department for Work and Pensions; October 2011–March 2013	Succeeded by None
