= Benton Park View =

- multi-agency site
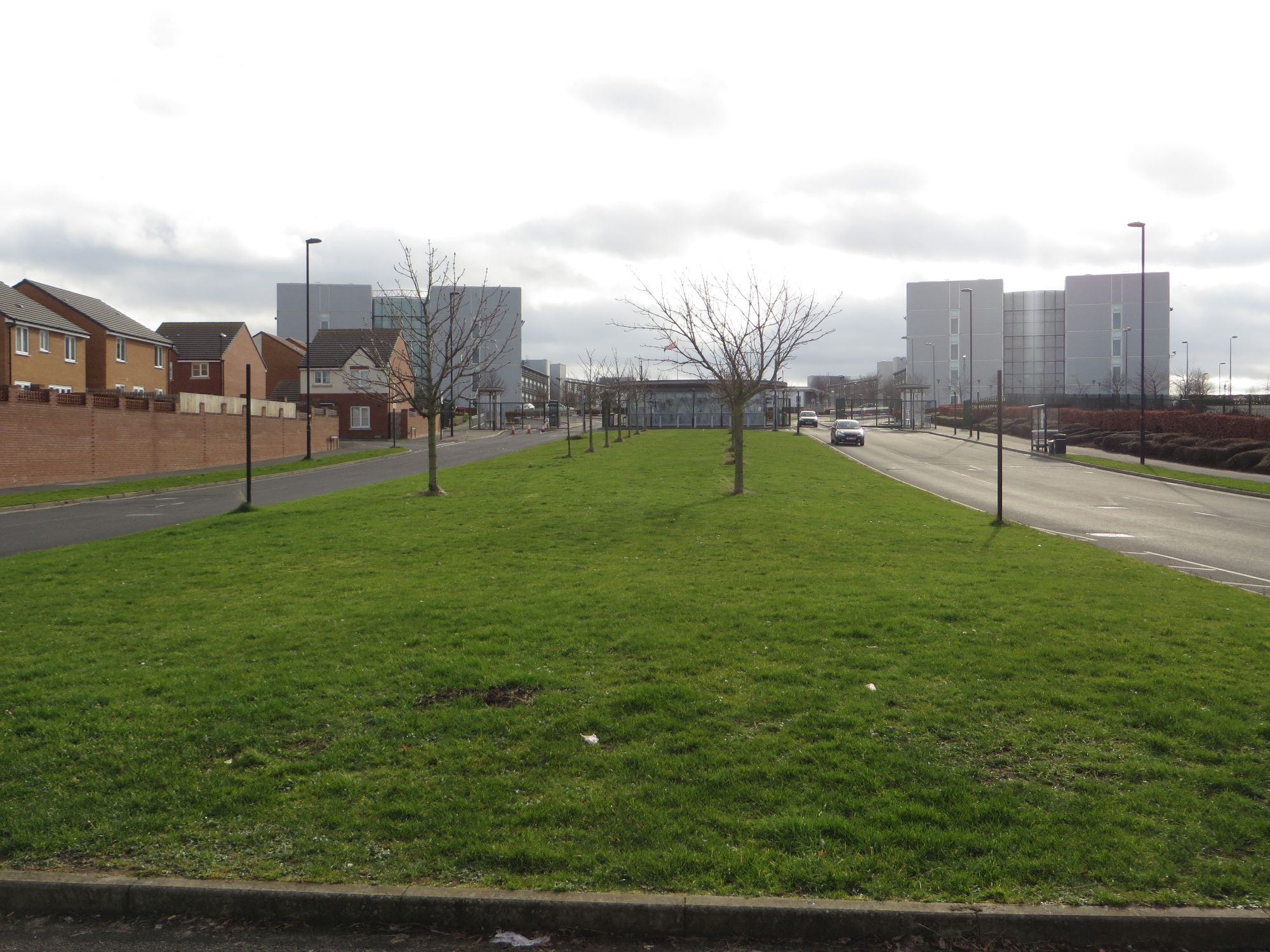
- Entrance to Benton Park View

- Location in Tyne and Wear
- Coordinates: 55.007°N 1.589°W
- OS grid reference: NZ264681
- Sovereign state: United Kingdom
- Country: England
- District: Tyne and Wear

Benton Park View, located in Benton, a suburb of the City of Newcastle upon Tyne, United Kingdom, is a multi-agency site of the UK Government. The complex is one of the largest secure civilian government complexes in Europe. The site is owned by Newcastle Estates Partnership and the principal tenants are His Majesty's Revenue and Customs (HMRC) and the Department for Work and Pensions (DWP). The site consists of a large group of office blocks within a secure perimeter.

The official name of the site is "Benton Park View", but it is known best, especially in Newcastle, as "The Ministry", after its original purpose as the administrative centre for the Ministry of Pensions (later the Ministry of Pensions and National Insurance).

The site is well served by public transport. The nearest stop on the Tyne and Wear Metro system is Longbenton, which also serves the nearby suburb in North Tyneside (north of the railway line) called 'Longbenton', and a station at Four Lane Ends is located a short distance away. Both stations are served by trains on the Yellow Line service of the Metro and a number of special bus services to bring workers from outlying areas.

== Function ==
The principal function of the site was originally to administer the UK's system of retirement and widows’ pensions, along with the system of National Insurance that raises contributions from both employers and employees for the purpose of financing those (and other) benefits of the British social welfare system. These functions had been handled in the past by the Department of Health and Social Security (DHSS), the Department of Social Security (DSS) and the Department for Work and Pensions (DWP) before transfer of the contributions aspect to HMRC.

This remains the main function of the site today, however as the government continues to rationalise its estate other government departments have moved in and will continue to move to the site. The DWP and its various agencies, including the Pension, Disability and Carers Service, Jobcentre Plus and the Health and Safety Executive also have staff based at the site.

== Current site ==
Early in the twenty-first century the site underwent a complete physical overhaul. All of the original buildings were demolished, replaced by a series of sixteen contemporary structures, built in grey metal and glass. These buildings include a reception building, a business events centre, and two restaurants, and a service building all of which are single-storey (although one of the restaurants has a basement that contains a sports and fitness centre), as well as eleven multi-storey office blocks.

The new site is, compared to the old site, remarkable for its extensive car parking areas, landscaping, and uncluttered appearance. The new buildings provide open plan office space with kitchen facilities, showers, shops selling drinks, snacks, and newspapers, and seating areas for both formal and informal meetings. Each of the buildings has a number, and also a name that is associated with a Northumbrian castle. The office blocks are called Bamburgh House, Lindisfarne House, Warkworth House, Chillingham House, Dunstanburgh House, Alnwick House, Norham House, Langley House, Tynemouth House, Belsay House and Prudhoe House. The two restaurants are called the Amble Inn and the Wark Inn.

== History ==
The site was created with the founding of the UK welfare system in the late 1940s and consisted of a series of 'H Blocks, So named due to their similarity to the letter 'H' when viewed from above. The old site consisted of a number of brick-built, single-storey H-shaped buildings that dated from the 1940s and a number of other buildings that dated from the 1960s, several of which were multi-storey blocks built in the minimalist concrete-and-glass style of the period. The older single-storey blocks were numbered (1–16) and the newer blocks designated by letter (A-D). The ‘H’ blocks are believed to have been built as a hospital accommodation for wounded servicemen from World War II, although the buildings were never used for this purpose. It is also widely believed that they were built by German prisoners of war and were never intended for long-term use. These buildings were considered suitable as office space and were to remain in service for fifty years. Over the next few decades, the site grew as a major source of employment in the north-east of England, particularly on Tyneside. During the 1970s, the site employed approximately 10,000 staff, and contained banks, a post office, a gentlemen's hairdresser manned by John Compton, a garden shop, and a staff canteen with licensed bar. Special bus transport was provided for staff that travelled to and from many locations in the area.

The number of staff employed on the site steadily declined over the 1980s and 1990s, and most of the amenities listed above closed as clerical functions came to be performed by computers and personnel were decanted to other sites, notably the Tyneview Park site, which is located a kilometre or so east of Benton Park View, and to sites at the Cobalt Business Park, situated between North Shields and Shiremoor. The physical deterioration of the buildings had become increasingly evident, and so it was decided to construct the new buildings while demolishing the old, moving staff appropriately.

The only remaining remnant of the old site is the George VI plinth, a small stone plinth named after the monarch who opened the site, that once formed the base of the flagpole at the entrance to the old site. The plinth now stands at the centre of a small outside seating area at the rear (or western) end of the site.

On 10 June 2021 it was announced that HMRC would be vacating the site in favour of a new, purpose built site in Newcastle City Centre. The relocation is expected to take place by 2027, on completion of the new site. It is still unknown what will happen to the site and its remaining tenants such as DWP when HMRC leaves.

== See also ==
- His Majesty's Revenue and Customs
- Department for Work and Pensions
- The Pension, Disability and Carers Service
- Tyneview Park
