= St Bartholomew's Church, Long Benton =

St. Bartholomew's Church, Long Benton

- St. Bartholomew's Church, Long Benton
- 55.0160412°N 1.5686333°W
- Location: Station Road, Forest Hall, Newcastle upon Tyne NE12 9NQ
- Denomination: Church of England
- Website: www.stbartholomews.org.uk

Administration
- Province: York
- Diocese: Newcastle
- Archdeaconry: Northumberland
- Parish: Long Benton

Clergy
- Vicar: The Rev'd Benjamin Jarvis

St Bartholomew's Church, Long Benton is the Anglican parish church of Longbenton, in Newcastle upon Tyne, Tyne and Wear. It is built in the Gothic Revival style.

== Background ==
Whilst limited evidence exists of church activity round Benton from the 7th and 8th centuries, it is from the mid-12th century that the existence of the parish of Long Benton can be assured, as the church can name its rectors from 1150 to the present day. Dr G. W. D. Briggs, in his publication 'St. Bartholomew's Church', states that 'there is a reference to transfer of the advowson by Roger de Merlay dated 1251 and then of the foundation of a chantry in honour of the Virgin Mary by 'Adam of Benton' dated 23 December 1310. This foundation names the church of St Andrew in Benton.' In 1339/1340, the church was transferred to the patronage of Balliol College, Oxford, which still holds it.

By 1790, the church had fallen into great disrepair, and had reached a stage where rebuilding was the only remaining option. The architect employed was William Newton, who designed and built the nave and tower over the foundations of the original church. Dr Besly, vicar of the parish from 1830 writes 'the chancel, which was then the responsibility of Balliol College, Oxford, was left in its original state in consequence of the disinclination of the lessees of the great tithes to undertake the expense of rebuilding it,' and the church was dedicated in honour of Saint Bartholomew and was consecrated by the Bishop of Peterborough, the Right Reverend Dr John Hinchcliffe on 2 November 1791. The chancel was rebuilt in 1855, with an organ chamber and south aisle being added in 1874. The vestry was added in 1888 and the date of the porch is uncertain.

In the early nineteenth century, St Bartholomew's Church was the parish church of the railway pioneer George Stephenson and his son, the future engineer Robert Stephenson, who lived at Dial Cottage in West Moor. George's wife Frances and their baby daughter, also called Frances, are buried in the churchyard, but it is not known where.

The new, octagonal Church Hall was built in 1980, replacing an earlier parish hall on the other side of Station Road, which had opened in 1925. In 1994, a new chapel, parish office and library were dedicated by the Bishop of Newcastle.

== Services ==
The Church still maintains daily Morning and Evening Prayer, with a mid-week Eucharist on a Wednesday. On a Sunday there are three services, with the main 'Sung Eucharist' at 10.00 am. The beautiful surroundings and traditional interior have made it a popular venue for weddings.

== Music ==
The church choir continues to attract musicians from a variety of age groups and musical heritage, meeting weekly for rehearsals, and singing at the Parish Eucharist once a week. The choir maintain a rich musical tradition, performing a both historical and modern music. They dress in traditional cassock and surplice.

The original organ was built by Nicholson and Son in 1874, and was rebuilt by J.J. Binns, Fitton & Haley. A description of its faculties can be found on The National Pipe Organ Register. This instrument was removed and replaced by a Copeman Hart digital instrument with sixty-one speaking stops built into a four-manual console in early 2014.

To mark the centenary of the rebuilding of the church, a peal of eight bells was installed, which are used before services and weddings.
