= Tesco Bank =

British retail bank

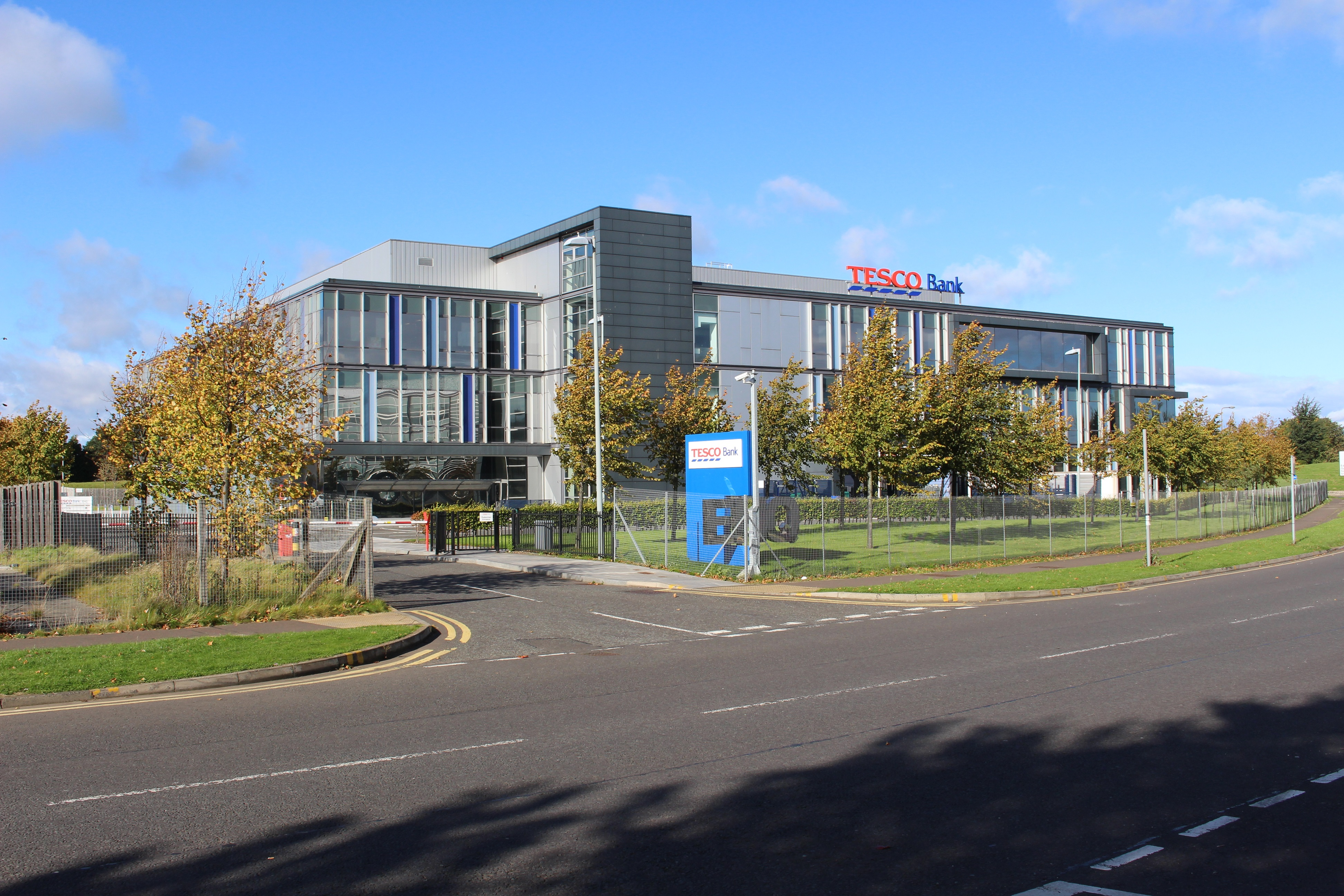
- Headquarters in Edinburgh, Scotland
- Formerly: Tesco Personal Finance Limited (1997–2008); Tesco Personal Finance plc (2008–2024)
- Type: Private
- Industry: Finance and insurance
- Predecessor: Tesco Personal Finance
- Founded: 5 March 1997; 29 years ago (incorporated); July 1997; 29 years ago (launched)
- Headquarters: Edinburgh, Scotland, UK
- Key people: Gerry Mallon (CEO)
- Products: Finance and insurance Mortgages; Credit Cards
- Revenue: ▲£1.075 billion (2013/14)
- Operating income: ▲£194.6 million (2013/14)
- Total assets: ▲£8.605 billion (2013/14)
- Number of employees: 3,900
- Parent: Barclays
- Subsidiaries: Tesco Compare
- Website: tescobank.com
- Footnotes; Tesco purchase of RBS stake completed 2008 Q4

Tesco Bank is a British retail banking brand operating as a trading name of Barclays. It was launched in July 1997 as part of a 50:50 joint venture between The Royal Bank of Scotland and Tesco, the largest supermarket in the United Kingdom, employing 2,800 people.

Tesco later acquired Royal Bank of Scotland shareholding, which resulted in the bank becoming a wholly owned subsidiary operating under its own banking licence under the Financial Services Compensation Scheme. Barclays currently offers a range of credit cards, loans, and savings using the Tesco Bank brand. The bank previously offered mortgages, current accounts, insurance and travel money products.

Tesco Bank customers can accumulate Tesco Clubcard points when they purchase finance products.

== History ==
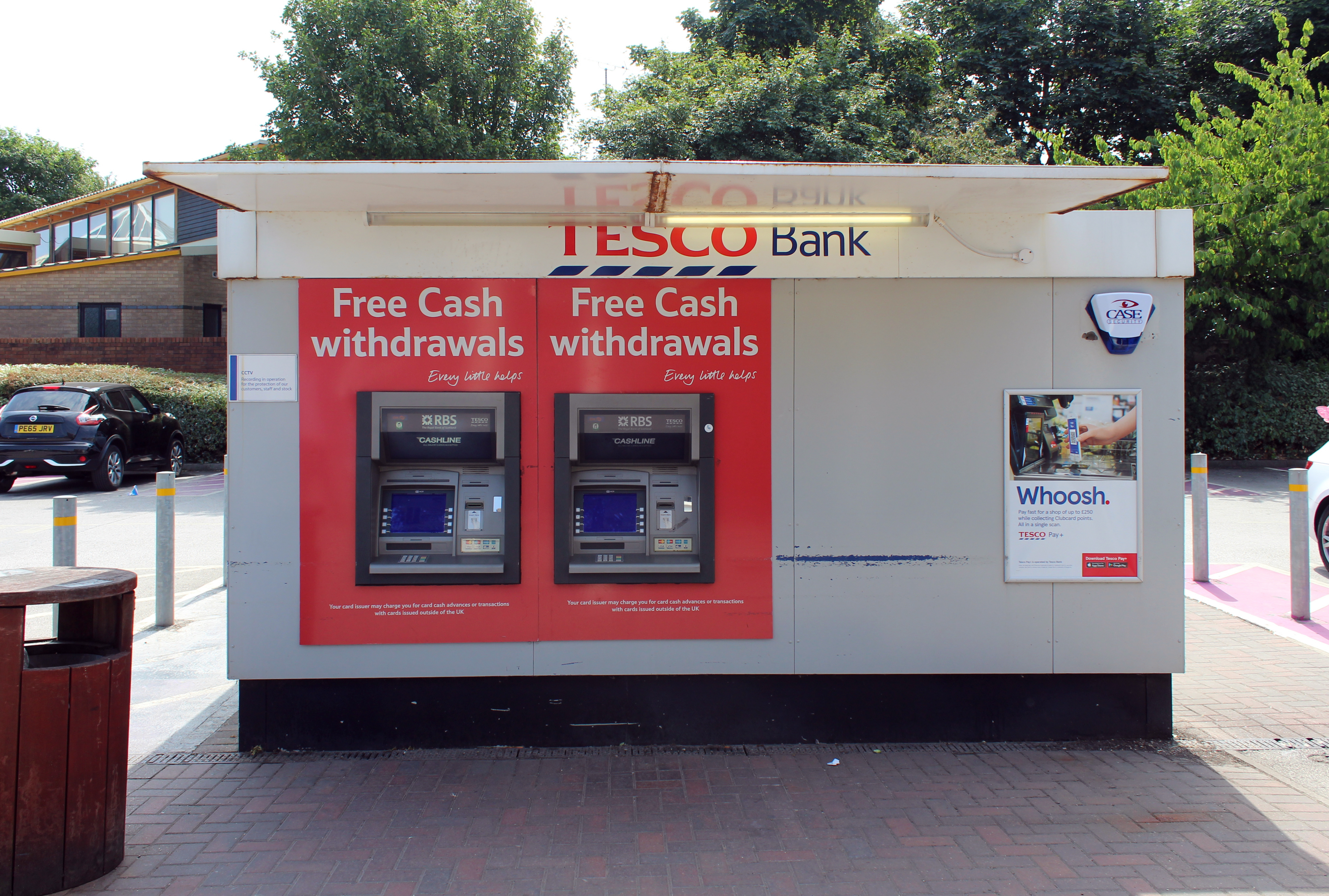
ATMs at a Tesco branch in Heswall

Prior to the formation of Tesco Personal Finance, Tesco had a banking joint venture with NatWest, which ended in February 1997. TPF was launched in July 1997, following the successful launch of Sainsbury's Bank by its main competitor, Sainsbury's. The bank was launched as a joint venture with the Royal Bank of Scotland, which processed all its financial transactions.

Subsidiary companies of the Royal Bank, such as Direct Line, UKI and Lombard Direct helped Tesco Personal Finance provide insurance products. In July 2008, Tesco announced that they were buying out the Royal Bank of Scotland's 50% stake in the company for £950 million, and the transaction was completed later that year. In October 2009, Tesco Personal Finance was renamed Tesco Bank.

In February 2024, Barclays announced the acquisition of the bank's credit cards, loans and savings operations for £700 million, with Tesco retaining its insurance, ATMs, travel money and gift card operations. The transfer of business was approved by the High Court on 17 October 2024 and took legal effect on 1 November 2024, with Barclays trading using the Tesco Bank brand and the operations retained by Tesco Personal Finance using separate brands.

== Services ==
Tesco Bank provides a range of personal accounts, including credit cards, loans, and savings accounts. Mortgages were added in August 2012, after briefly offering products provided by First Active in November 2004. The bank confirmed in December 2013 that it planned to launch a current account, and the first account was launched on 10 June 2014. Tesco Bank launched its first mobile app in 2014, supporting its core transactional products (Current and Savings accounts as well as Credit cards). In subsequent years it launched a number of innovative features including “balance peek” in 2015 and was the first bank in the world to deploy an app for Apple Watch at its launch in 2015.

Tesco Bank sold its mortgage portfolio to Lloyds Banking Group in September 2019, and in February 2020, the bank also decided to stop offering current accounts to new customers. On 26 July 2021, Tesco Bank announced it will be closing all current accounts held by its customers, citing "limited activity".

== Locations ==
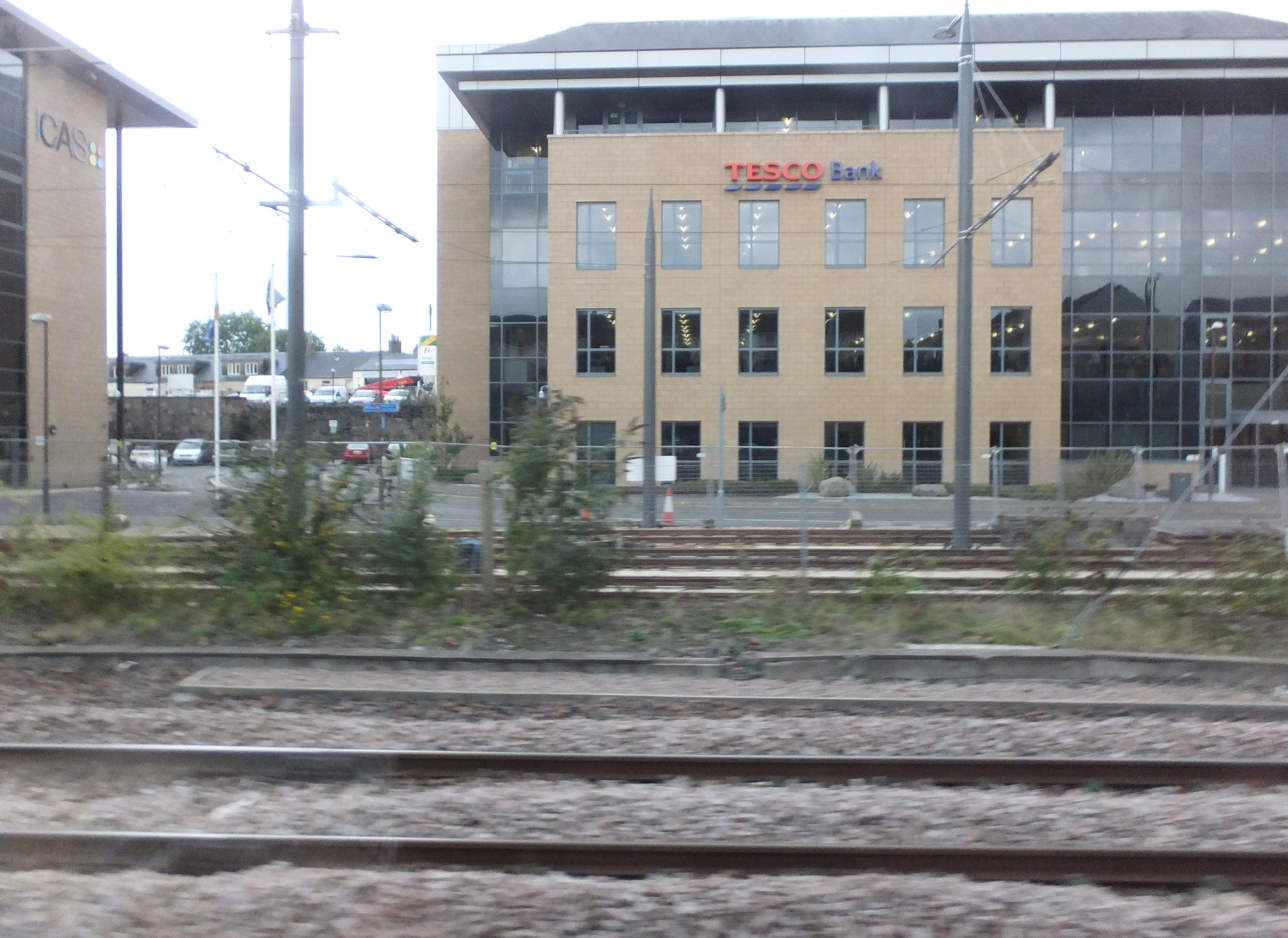
Former premises in Haymarket, Edinburgh

The bank is registered in Scotland at 2 South Gyle Crescent, Edinburgh EH12 9FQ. While operating as a joint venture, the bank shared its registered office with RBS at St Andrew Square, Edinburgh. In July 2010, Tesco Bank opened two major offices at Quorum Business Park in Newcastle, and a larger one at Broadway One in Glasgow. Since then, there has also been an office opened in South Gyle, Edinburgh.

During March 2009, Tesco initiated a plan to roll out in store branches, under the Tesco Bank branding. On 14 May 2016, Tesco Bank closed all three remaining branches, with a focus on being a completely online bank.

== Fraud incident 2016 ==
On 6 November 2016, British newspapers reported that customers of Tesco Bank were reporting that hundreds or in some cases thousands of pounds had been lost from their accounts, with some reporting unauthorised card transactions originating in Brazil. The following day, the bank suspended online transactions, and made a statement saying up to 40,000 customers had been affected.

Shares in the retails group fell 3% on the news. On Tuesday 8 November, the chief executive of the UK Financial Conduct Authority was asked for a summary of the issue by a Parliamentary committee, and said of the attack that "There are elements of this that look unprecedented and it is serious, clearly". The bank declared that the cyber attack resulted in the loss of £2.5 million. Later, United Kingdom's Financial Conduct Authority asked the bank to pay £16.4 million as the penalty.
