= Forest Hall railway station =

Disused railway station in Forest Hall, Tyne and Wear

Forest Hall

General information
- Location: Forest Hall; North Tyneside; Tyne and Wear; England
- Coordinates: 55.022°N 1.5682°W
- Grid reference: NZ277698
- Platforms: 2

Other information
- Status: Disused

History
- Original company: North Eastern Railway
- Post-grouping: LNER; British Railways (North Eastern)

Key dates
- February 1856: Opened as Benton
- 1 December 1874: Name changed to Forest Hall
- 15 September 1958: Closed
Location
- Location within Tyne and Wear

Forest Hall was a railway station that served the village of Forest Hall in the borough of North Tyneside, Tyne and Wear, England. It was located on the East Coast Main Line and was open from 1856 to 1958. It was originally known as Benton.

It should not be confused with the short-lived Forest Hall railway station on the Blyth and Tyne Railway, which opened in 1864 and closed in 1871.

== History ==
The station was opened as Benton in February 1856 by the North Eastern Railway. It was situated north of the level crossing behind 'The Flying Scotsman' public house. There were no goods sidings at Forest Hall but the RCH Handbook of Sidings indicates that goods traffic was handled at the station, which may have been small items that could have been dealt with at the passenger platforms.

On 1 December 1874, the station's name was changed to Forest Hall to avoid confusion with the Benton station on the Blyth and Tyne Railway, which had been acquired by the North Eastern Railway in that year. In 1951, only 1,928 tickets were sold in the year; less than 6 a day. This inevitably lead to the closure of the station on 15 September 1958 to both passengers and goods traffic.

Preceding station	Historical railways	Following station
Heaton; Line open, station closed	North Eastern Railway; York, Newcastle and Berwick Railway	Killingworth; Line open, station closed
