= St Mary's Catholic School, Newcastle upon Tyne =

St Mary's Catholic School

Location
- Benton Park Road; Longbenton, Newcastle upon Tyne, Tyne and Wear, NE7 7PE; England; 55°00′26″N 1°35′38″W

Information
- Type: Academy
- Mottoes: Auxilium Christianorum (Help of the Christians); Where Everyone Can Succeed; The North East's Most Cultural School; Shining together in faith, joy and love
- Religious affiliation: Roman Catholic
- Established: 1954
- Local authority: Newcastle upon Tyne
- Department for Education URN: 108534 Tables
- Head teacher: Emma Patterson
- Gender: Coeducational
- Age: 11 to 18
- Enrolment: 1140
- Colours: Navy, Light Blue, white
- Website: http://stmarysnewcastle.co.uk/

St Mary's Catholic School (formerly St Mary's Catholic Comprehensive School) is an English secondary school in Longbenton, Newcastle, England. In September 2013, following conversion to Academy, the 'Comprehensive' was officially removed from the school's name.

== History ==
St Mary's started life as a technical school for boys in 1954, and was located on the north side of Rutherford Street, a short street between Bath Lane and Westgate Road in Newcastle until September 1966. It then moved to its current site in Benton Park Road in Longbenton where it continued to be a boys-only school until 1977. As a result of the re-organisation of Catholic Schools in 1977 St Mary's became a co-educational Catholic Comprehensive. The school was based on three sites, one in Longbenton, one in Walker and one in Killingworth. These three sites were brought together some years later to its current site in Longbenton and is now the only Catholic co-educational secondary school in Newcastle. The school is part of the family of Catholic schools in the Diocese of Hexham and Newcastle.

New buildings for the school were completed in September 2011, including an atrium, the chapel, the main hall and sports facilities. The original building was demolished and the site landscaped to provide a range of sports areas, a memorial garden, a wildlife area, and seating areas for students.

== Achievements ==
In July 2007 the school was awarded Humanities College status by the government, and given an additional £500,000 to develop further expertise in English, religious education and the performing arts. The school has also been awarded the Arts Mark, and has the Healthy Schools Award. Its website has also won the purpleyouth.com Bronze award for best school website.

== Emblem, logos and identities ==
stmonline Logo

The Fleur-de-lis contained within the arms of St Mary's is the symbol most commonly used by the school, and is used on letterheads and newsletters as the logo. The lily represents the Mother of God and the three castles represent the city of Newcastle upon Tyne. The motto of St Mary's is "Shining together in faith joy and love", updated in 2024.

== Notable former pupils ==
- Brian Chambers, footballer
- Bill Green, footballer
- Joy Eze, sprinter
