= Forest Hall =

Village in Tyne and Wear, England

Coordinates: 55.0209°N 1.5689°W

- Location within Tyne and Wear
- OS grid reference: NZ269683
- Metropolitan borough: North Tyneside
- Metropolitan county: Tyne and Wear
- Region: North East
- Country: England
- Sovereign state: United Kingdom
- Post town: NEWCASTLE UPON TYNE
- Postcode district: NE12
- Dialling code: 0191
- Police: Northumbria
- Fire: Tyne and Wear
- Ambulance: North East
- UK Parliament: Newcastle upon Tyne North

Forest Hall is a village in the borough of North Tyneside, Tyne and Wear, England. It is 4 miles from Newcastle upon Tyne. It borders Killingworth to the north, Holystone to the east and Benton to the south. The village was named after the Forest Hall, which incorporated a medieval tower. Woodside Court was built on the site of the Hall, which was demolished in 1962.

== History ==
=== Dial Cottage ===
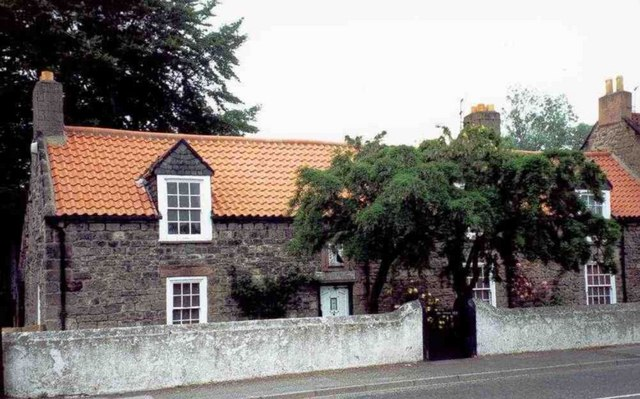
Dial Cottage. The sun-dial made and installed by George Stephenson is above the front door.

Dial Cottage, a grade II listed building and home from 1804 to 1823 of railway pioneer George Stephenson, is located on Great Lime Road in Forest Hall. It was while he was living there that Stephenson developed one of the world's earliest locomotives, called the Blücher, as well as several others which ran on the Killingworth Colliery from 1814. The trackbed is now a public footpath which can be accessed from Great Lime Road a kilometre east of the cottage.

The cottage is privately owned, though tours occasionally take place. At the cottage there is a sundial, which Stephenson built himself and which gives the cottage its name, and a plaque which reads:

“George Stephenson. Engineer, inventor of the Locomotive Engine. Lived in this cottage from 1805 to 1823; his first locomotive (Blücher) was built at the adjacent colliery wagon shops, and on July 25, 1814 was placed on the wagonway which crosses the road at the east end of this cottage."

== Geography ==
=== Station Road North ===
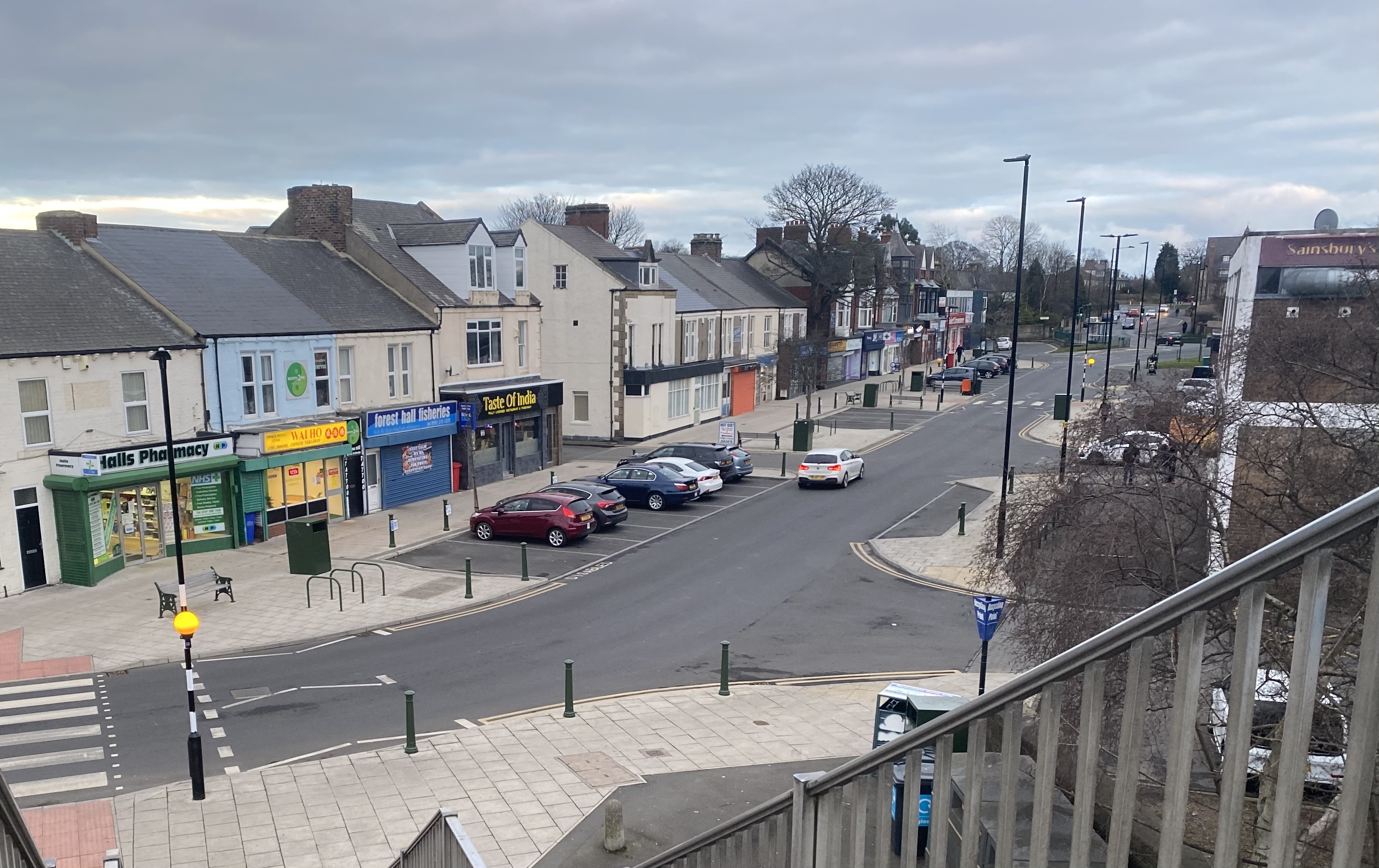
Station Road North, Forest Hall

Forest Hall's main shopping centre is Station Road North and the pub Flying Scotsman is close to the former railway station. Additionally, Springfield Park, a public park, is located near Station Road North; it has sports grounds, a playground and a community centre. In 2019, North Tyneside Council completed a £500,000 public works project into Station Road North; this included replacing the paving tiles, installing new benches and raising the road junction at the western end of the street as a traffic calming measure.

== Governance ==
Forest Hall is located in the borough of North Tyneside in the ceremonial county of Tyne & Wear. Its parliamentary constituency is also called North Tyneside, represented since 2010 by Mary Glindon. The village does not have its own council ward and is divided between multiple wards named after other localities; most of Forest Hall, including Station Road North and the area along Station Road, is in Benton Ward, while most of Palmersville is in Killingworth Ward and most of Westmoor is in Longbenton Ward. As of February 2022, the town's councillors are:

Benton Ward
Labour	Peter Earley
Labour	Janet Hunter
Labour	Pat Oliver

Killingworth Ward
Labour	Gary Bell
Labour	Linda Darke
Labour	Erin Parker Leonard

Longbenton Ward
Labour	Karen Clarke
Labour	Eddie Darke
Labour	Joan Walker

The Labour Party has held all three wards since 2008 when Benton Ward's seat was won by Leslie Birkinfield and Killingworth's was won by Norma Peggs, both Conservatives.

== Education ==
Primary Schools

- Forest Hall Primary School
- St Mary's Roman Catholic Primary School
- Ivy Road Primary School
- Westmoor Primary School

There are no secondary schools within Forest Hall, but George Stephenson High School in Killingworth and Longbenton High School are both nearby. The nearest higher education providers are Newcastle University and Northumbria University.

== Religion ==
Churches

- St Bartholomew's - Church of England
- St Andrew's - Methodist
- St Mary's - Roman Catholic
- Westmoor Methodist Church
- Bethesda Gospel Hall
- Kingdom hall- Jehovah's witnesses

There are no non-Christian places of worship in the area; the nearest synagogue is in Gosforth and the nearest mosque is in Heaton.

== Transport ==
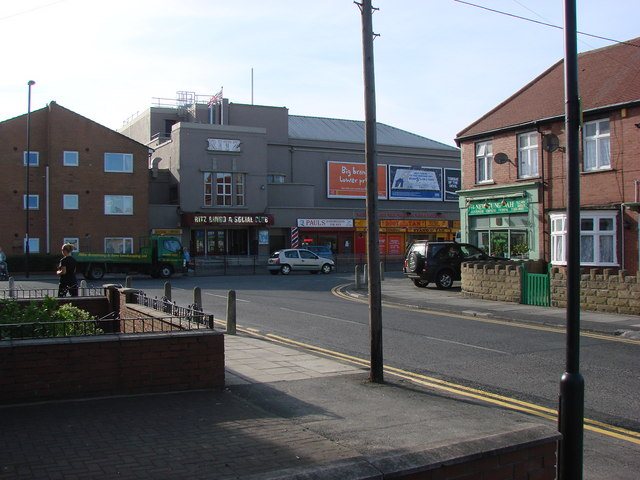
The Ritz, Forest Hall

Several bus routes pass through Forest Hall, linking it to both Newcastle city centre and other surrounding areas such as Cramlington and Whitley Bay. The number 355 bus takes twenty minutes to travel to the Haymarket bus station, while the 63 takes thirty to the Monument. Both serve bus stops at or near the Ritz, a former cinema and a local landmark on Forest Hall Road.

Forest Hall's two main road thoroughfares are Great Lime Road and Station Road. Great Lime Road is an east-west route through the north of the town between Westmoor and Palmersville and on to Holystone. Station Road is a north-south route from Station Road North through the south of the town and on to Benton. There are no major A-roads within Forest Hall itself but the western terminus of Great Lime Road is at Findus Roundabout on the A189, and Holystone roundabout on the A19 is near Palmersville.

The East Coast Main Line passes the village which was once served by a railway station until 1958. Benton station on the Tyne & Wear Metro is located less than a mile away. Palmersville, however, does have its own Metro station, which is located at the far eastern edge of the village, and also serves Holystone.
