= Pension, Disability and Carers Service =

Executive agency of the DWP

The Pension, Disability and Carers Service was an executive agency of the Department for Work and Pensions (DWP) which was created in April 2008.

The PDCS brought together two former separate executive agencies, The Pension Service and the Disability and Carers Service. These two agencies kept their corporate branding and provided services under their separate identities. The two agencies shared roughly fifty percent of the same customers and the rationalisation of services was believed to be likely to provide a better service.

Its status as an executive agency was removed on 1 October 2011 with its functions being brought back inside the DWP.
