= Benton, Tyne and Wear =

Coordinates: 55.014°N 1.587°W

Benton
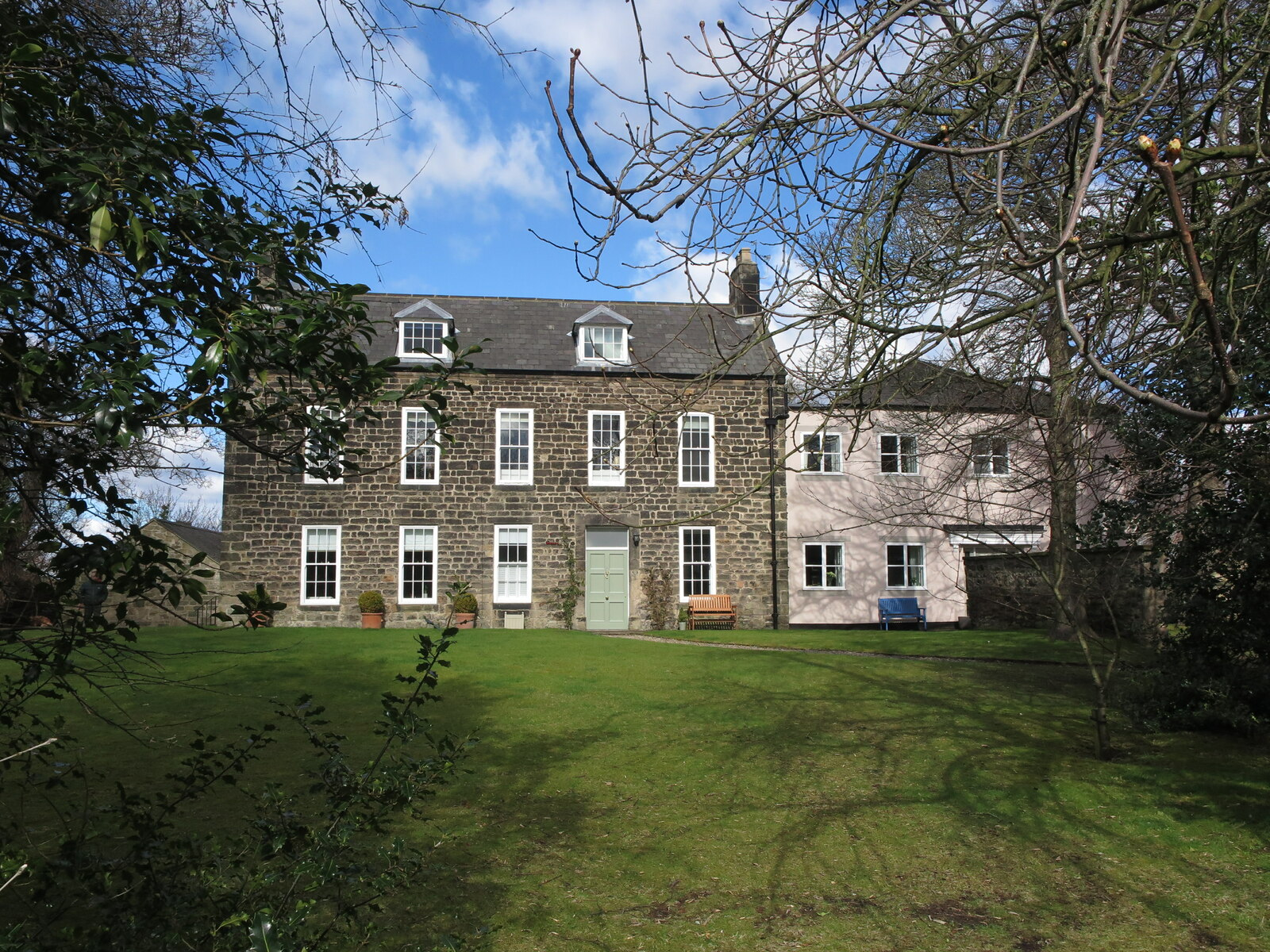
- Former vicarage, Front Street

- Location within Tyne and Wear
- Population: 10,359 (North Tyneside ward 2011)
- OS grid reference: NZ265689
- Metropolitan borough: Newcastle upon Tyne and North Tyneside
- Metropolitan county: Tyne and Wear
- Region: North East
- Country: England
- Sovereign state: United Kingdom
- Post town: NEWCASTLE UPON TYNE
- Postcode district: NE7
- Dialling code: 0191
- Police: Northumbria
- Fire: Tyne and Wear
- Ambulance: North East

Benton is an area of North Tyneside in Tyne and Wear, England. It is 4 miles (6 km) to the north east of Newcastle upon Tyne. The parish of St Bartholomew, Longbenton, is within the North Tyneside district. The population of the North Tyneside Ward taken at the Census 2011 was 10,359. The area is contiguous with the suburbs of Newcastle.

== History ==
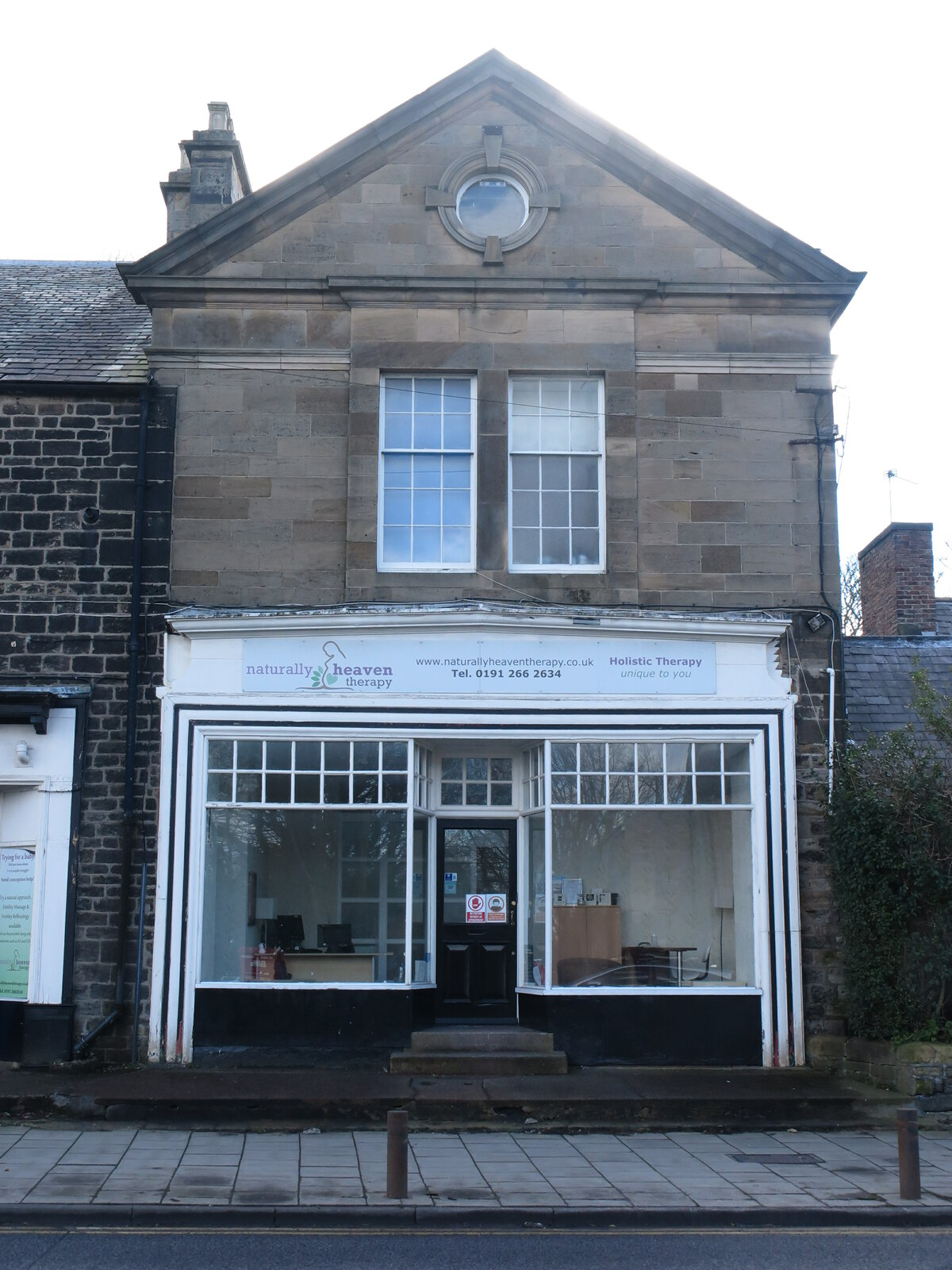
Shop, Front Street

The centre of the Benton district is the old village of Longbenton which stretches along Front Street on the Old Coast Road. The opening of the station in the nineteenth century caused the district around the railway to be developed as a desirable, out-of-town suburb. It retains its character to this day and two areas, around the village itself and around the station, have been designated as conservation areas. Benton Metro station dates from 1871. The line was electrified in the early years of the twentieth century and later became part of the Metro system. Some of the original station buildings are still in use, some were removed during the conversion to Metro service.

== Architecture ==
There are also Metro stations at Four Lane Ends and Longbenton. To the north west of the station, stretching across to South Gosforth, is Longbenton Estate. This area is undergoing substantial redevelopment and refurbishment.

Longbenton Community College, the home of Longbenton Community College Senior Choir who recently toured Prague, is situated in Hailsham Avenue. Other places of education within the locality include Benton Park Primary School, which opened in 1953 and is part of Newcastle L.A., and St Bartholomew's C of E Primary School, which is part of North Tyneside L.A. Three other North Tyneside primary schools are located on Longbenton Estate: the new Benton Dene school, Balliol, and St Stephen's RC. Northumbria University has a campus on Coach Lane.

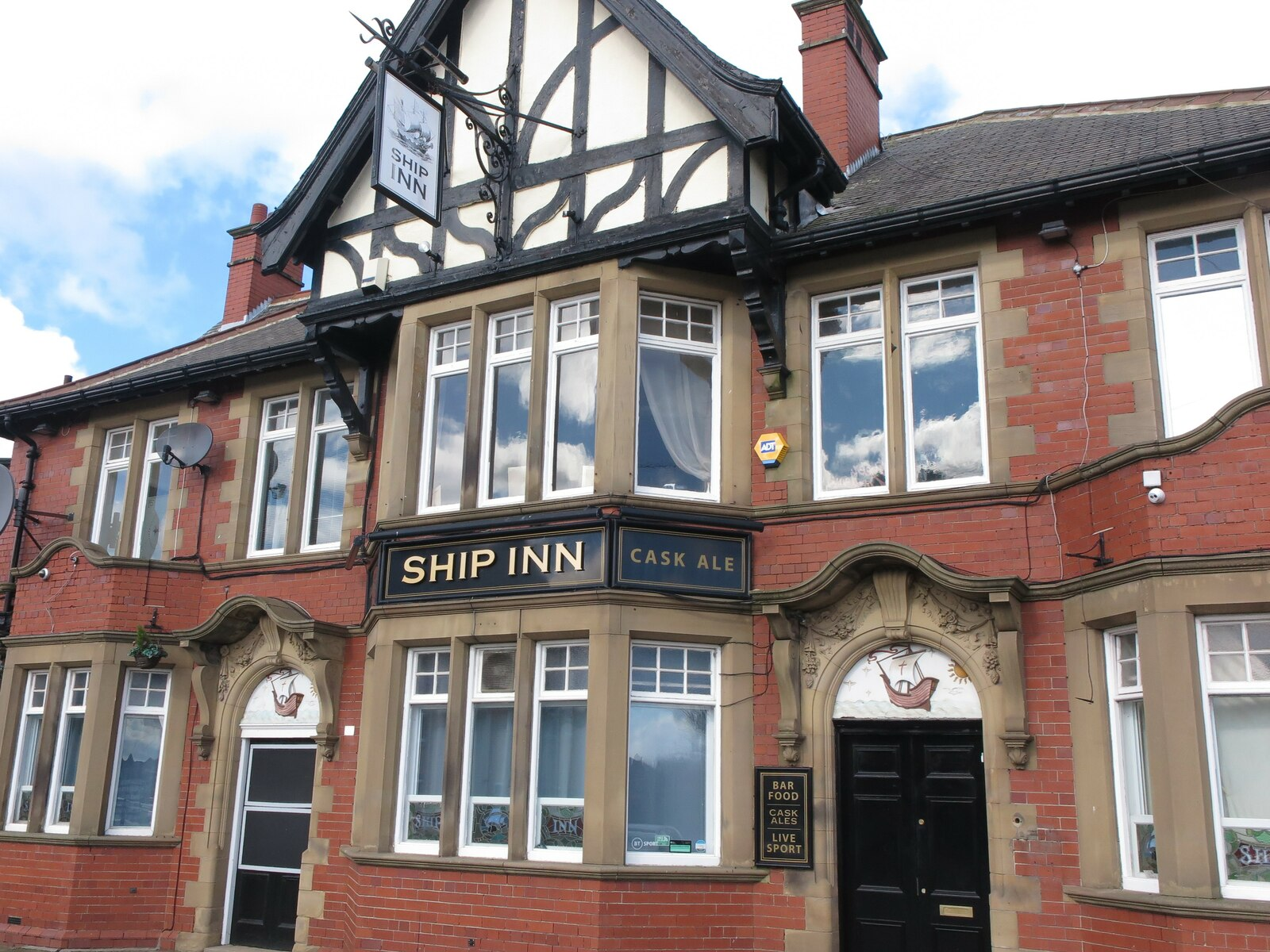
The Ship Inn

There are three public houses in the village: The Benton Alehouse (formerly The Sun Inn), The Black Bull and The Ship Inn. An Italian restaurant, Casa Antonio, is situated on Front Street.

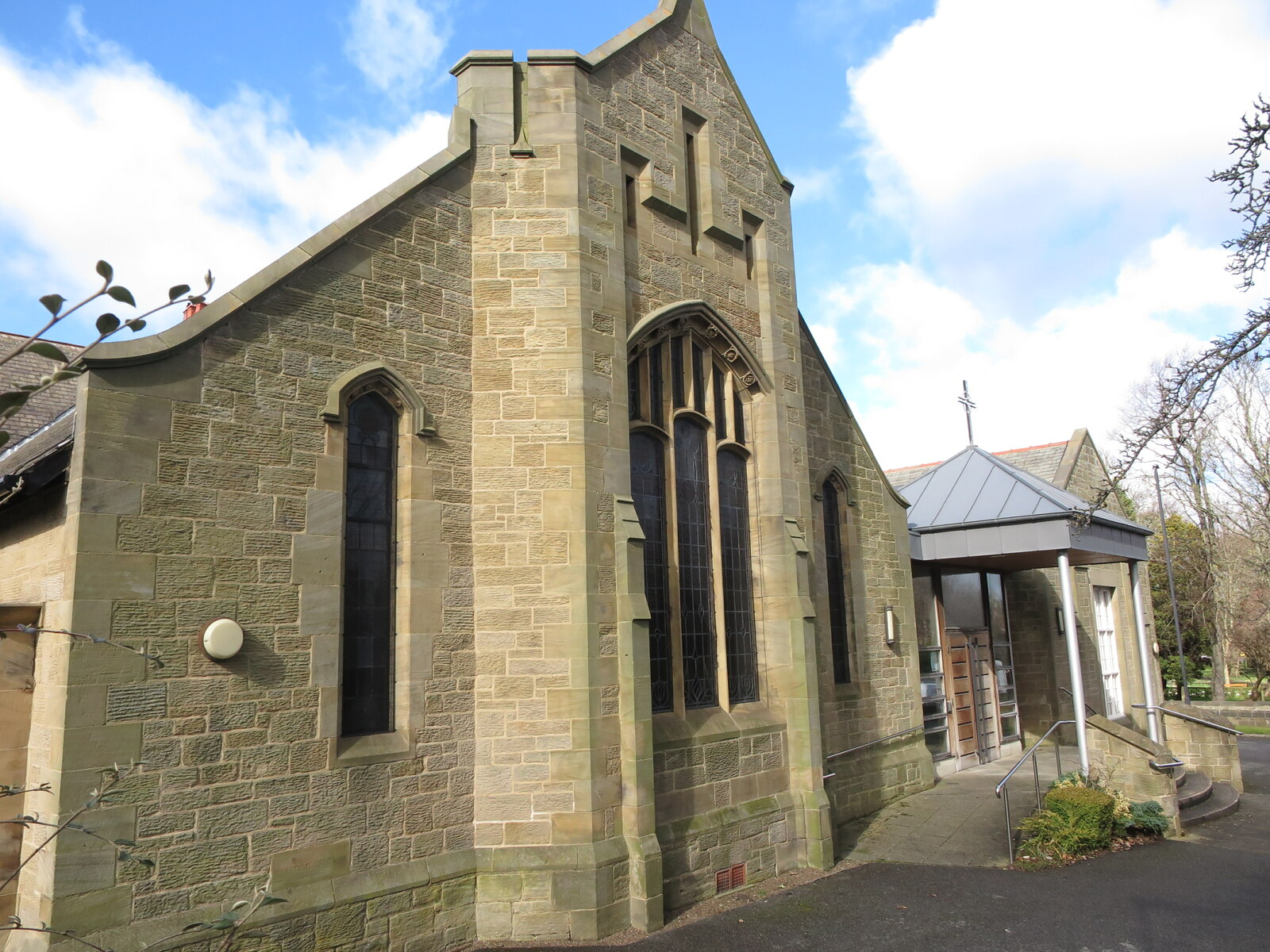
St Andrew's Church

St Aidan's RC Church is a modern building at the corner of Whitley Road and Coach Lane. St Andrew's Church (Methodist and URC Combined) and St Bartholomew's Church (Anglican), the Parish Church, are located on Station Road, to the north of the railway line. On Longbenton Estate there is a Methodist church on Chester's Avenue; the Anglican St Mary Magdalene on West Farm Avenue and St Peter and St Paul's RC Church in Bardsey Place.

== Notable people ==
- Peter Beardsley. Former Footballer for several English clubs who lived in Benton as a child
- Jimmy Nail, Actor and singer, was born at Benton in 1954, though he now lives in London.
- Varada Sethu, actor.
