= Longbenton High School =

School in Newcastle upon Tyne, England

Location
- Hailsham Avenue; Newcastle upon Tyne, Tyne and Wear, NE12 8ER; England
- 55°01′07″N 1°34′27″W

Information
- Former name: Longbenton Community College (2016)
- Type: Secondary school
- Motto: Evolve, Create, Discover, Perform, Achieve
- Religious affiliation: Mixed
- Established: 1953
- Local authority: North Tyneside
- Department for Education URN: 108645 Tables
- Ofsted: Reports
- Headteacher: Joe Elliott
- Staff: Est. of staff - 180
- Gender: Coeducational
- Age: 11 to 18
- Enrolment: 1010
- Website: http://www.longbenton.org.uk

Longbenton High School is a smaller than average Secondary School located in Benton, North Tyneside, England. Operating under the two-tier system in North Tyneside, the school takes students from age 11-18. The school building also includes a very small Sixth Form, joint with George Stephenson High School. The joint sixth form used to be in partnership with Seaton Burn College and branded as the Northwest Cluster. However now it is simply known as 'NE12 Sixth Form', as both campuses fall under the NE12 Postcode. This change was not advertised at all by the school, both internally or externally.

== History ==
The school was originally built in, and opened officially for the new year in September 1953. It was originally named after Thomas Addison and the girls and boys were kept separate. What was the East Block was the girls' side, and what was West Block was the boys' side. The old HMT block was the girls' canteen. The school was turned into a mixed college and became known as Longbenton School.

The school became known as Longbenton Community College some time ago, when the management reached out into the community and started adult teaching classes, often outside of school hours.

In the winter of 2014, construction company Galliford Try began work on the new £14m school, in the middle of the existing site. This involved the demolition of the City Learning Centre, Sports Hall, Library and Sixth Form Building. The new building was funded by the Education Funding Agency, and was constructed very similarly to other new builds in the area, such as Bedlingtonshire Community High School.

The new building opened to students on Thursday, 8 September 2016, which marked a fresh start for Longbenton with the new brand of Longbenton High School. The old West Block, East Block, HMT, Canteen and DT block were all demolished following the opening of Longbenton High School.

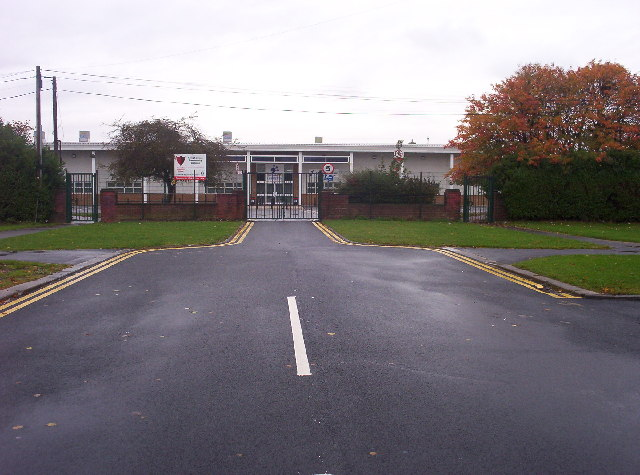
LCC Gates - City Learning Centre - Front of New School

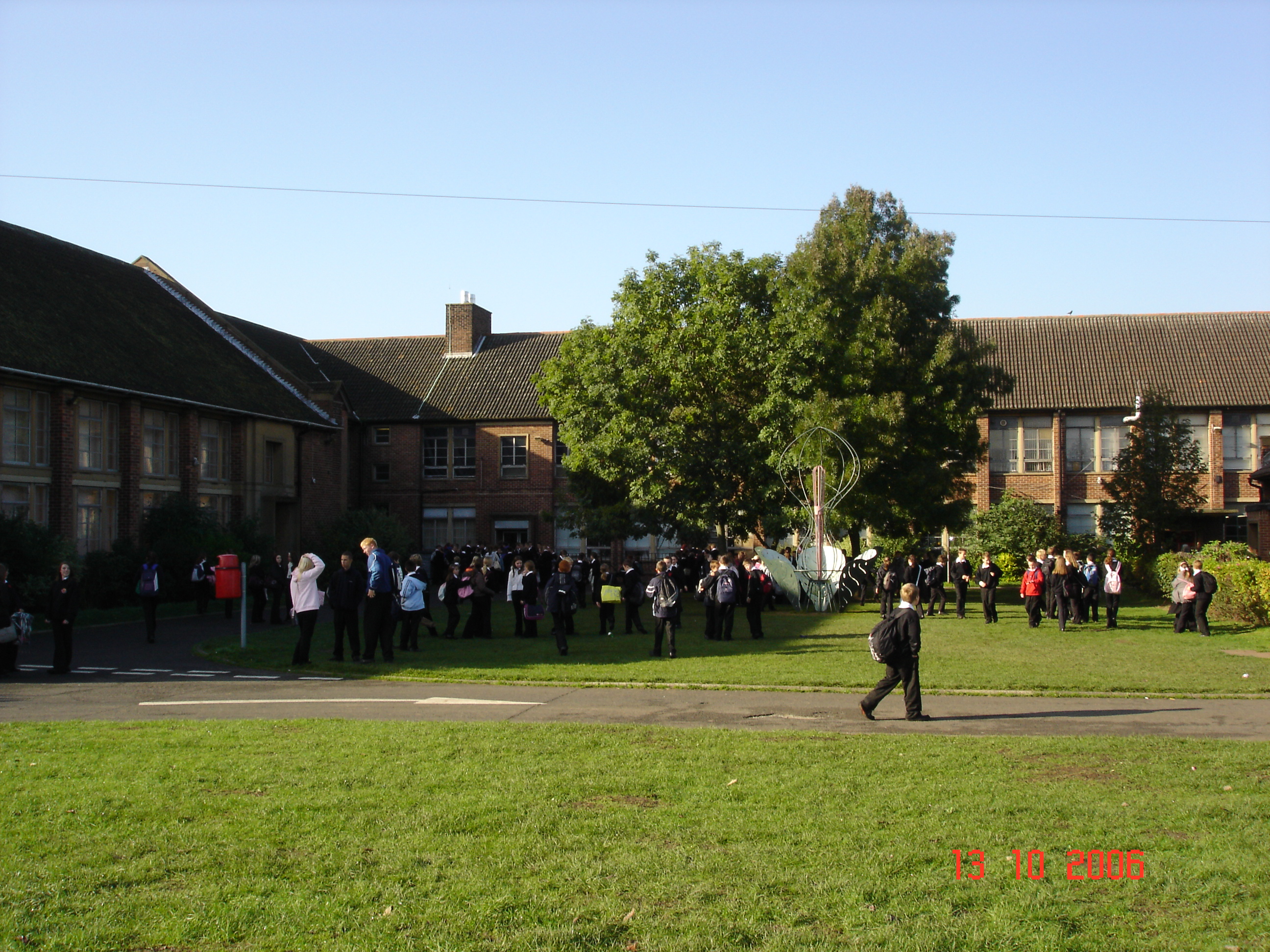
LCC West Block - Now a Playing Field

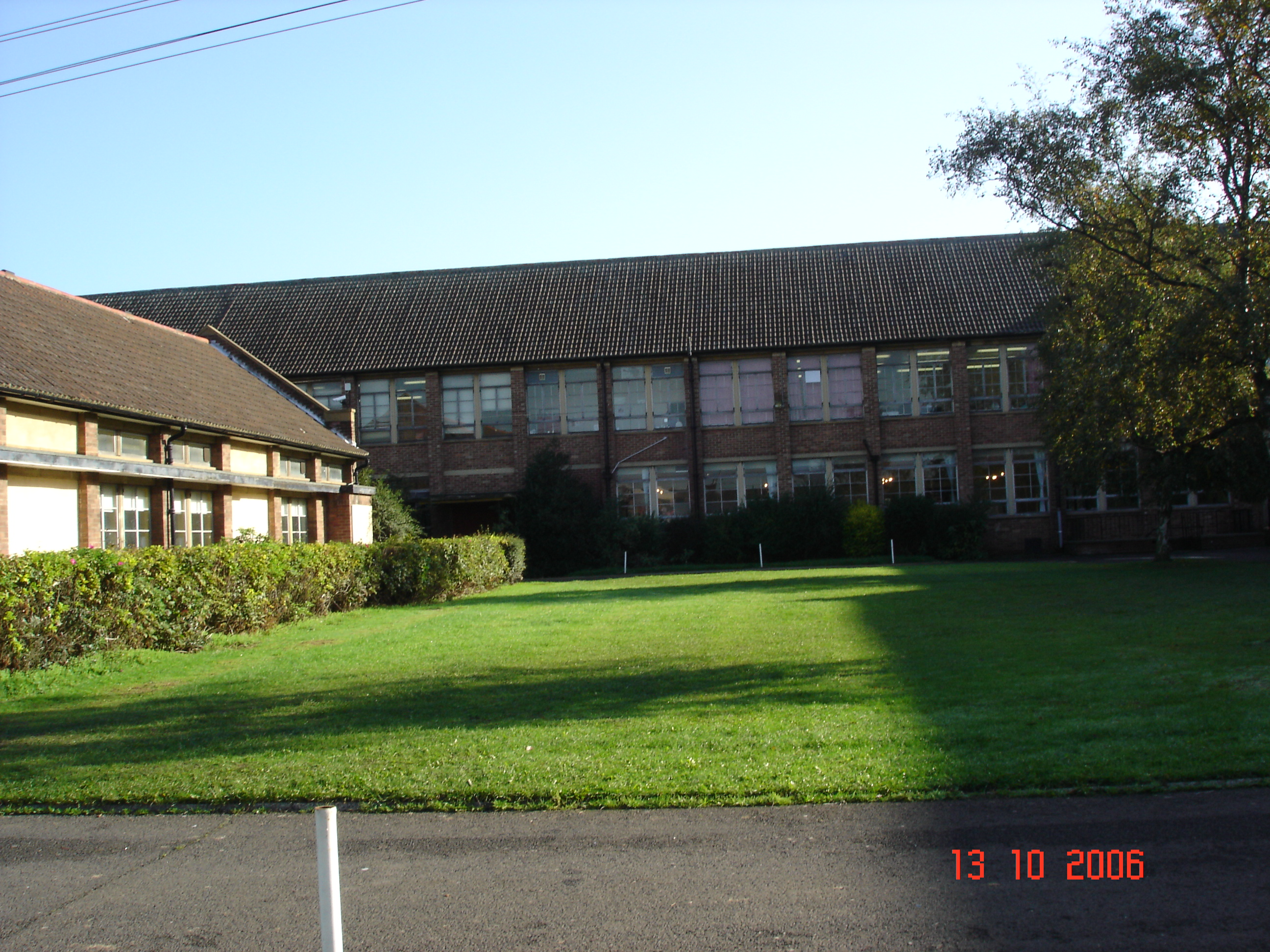
LCC East Block and HMT - Now Mostly Disused / Path to Benton Dene Primary School

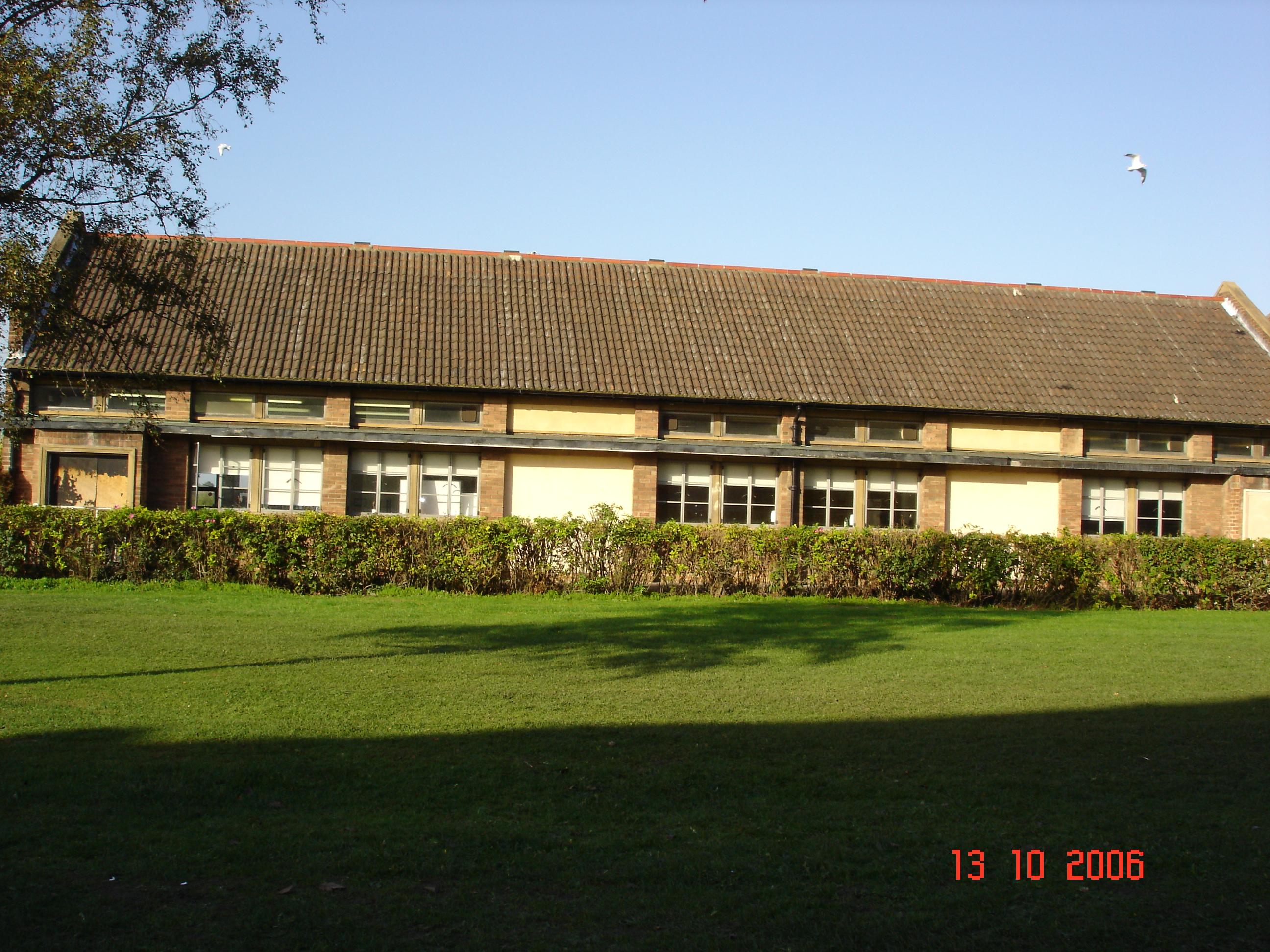
LCC HMT Block

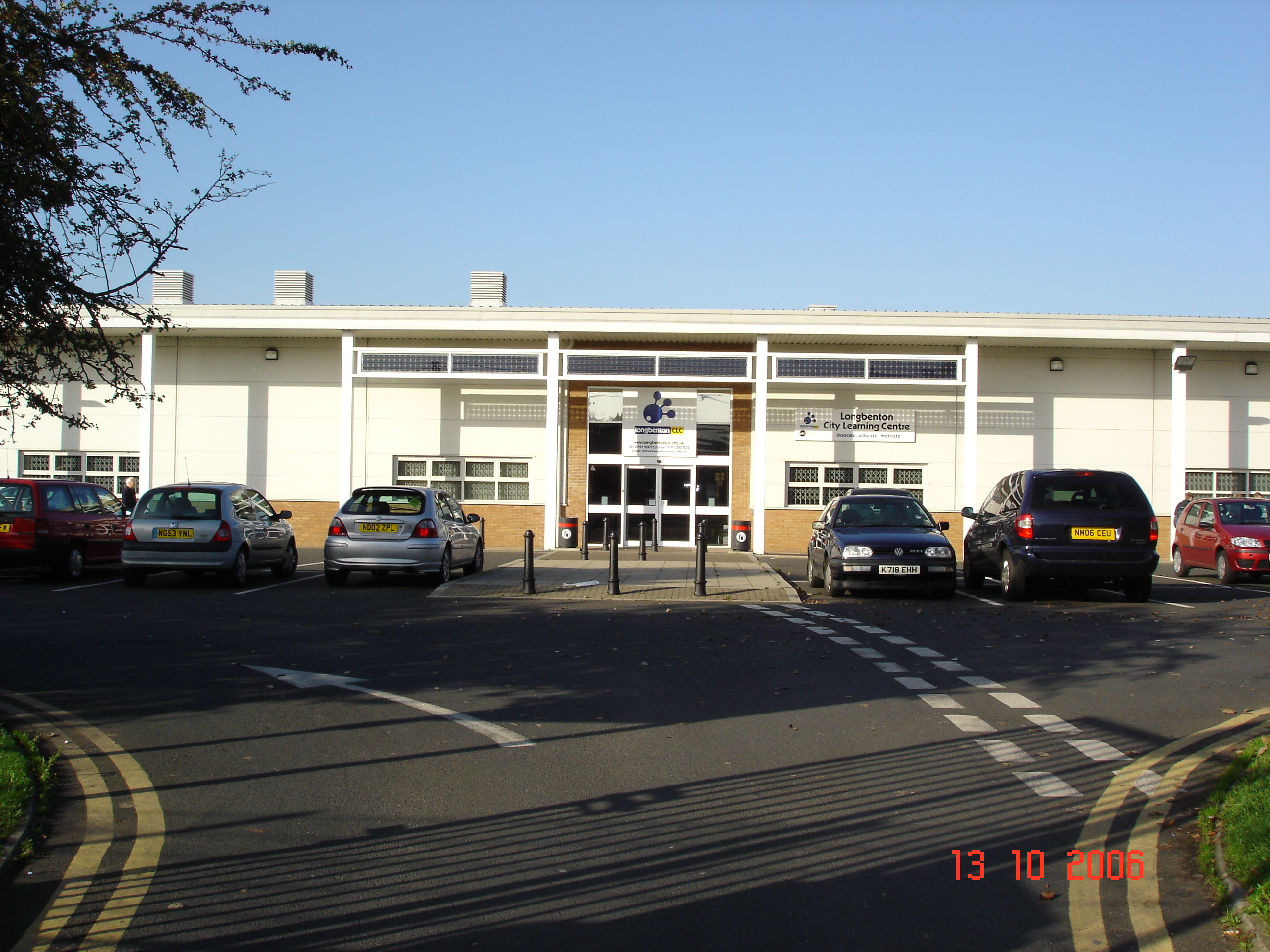
LCC - CLC Close Up. - Now Front of New School

== Alumni ==
Notable ex-pupils include rugby union player Sarah Hunter MBE and England footballer Peter Beardsley MBE.

- Sqn Ldr David Thomas, Red Arrows from 2001, Red Seven in 2003, and synchro pair, Harrier pilot with 3 Sqn
