= Killingworth =

Town in Tyne and Wear, England

Coordinates: 55.0318°N 1.5557°W

- Location within Tyne and Wear
- Population: 20,079 (Killingworth and Camperdown wards 2011)
- OS grid reference: NZ2777
- Metropolitan borough: North Tyneside
- Metropolitan county: Tyne and Wear
- Region: North East
- Country: England
- Sovereign state: United Kingdom
- Post town: NEWCASTLE UPON TYNE
- Postcode district: NE12
- Dialling code: 0191
- Police: Northumbria
- Fire: Tyne and Wear
- Ambulance: North East
- UK Parliament: Cramlington and Killingworth

Killingworth is a town in North Tyneside, Tyne and Wear, England, within the historic county of Northumberland.

Killingworth was built as a new town in the 1960s, next to Killingworth Village, which existed for centuries before the new town was built. Other nearby villages include Forest Hall, West Moor and Backworth.

Killingworth is linked to the rest of Tyne and Wear by bus routes. The town is not on the Tyne and Wear Metro network; its nearest Metro stations are Palmersville and Benton.

The town of Killingworth in Australia is named after the British original because of its extensive coal mines.

== Culture ==
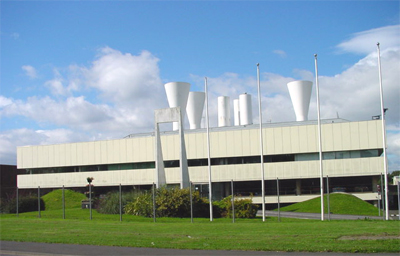
Former British Gas building

Killingworth was used as a filming location for the 1973 BBC sitcom Whatever Happened to the Likely Lads?, with one of the houses on Agincourt on the Highfields estate featuring as the home of Bob and Thelma Ferris.

In an episode of the architecture series Grundy's Wonders on Tyne Tees, John Grundy deemed Killingworth's former British Gas Research Centre to be the best industrial building in the North East.

The Doctor Who episode titled "The Mark of the Rani" depicted Killingworth in the 19th century, with the Sixth Doctor in search of George Stephenson, after the Doctor's arch-enemy The Master attempts to hijack the Industrial Revolution. Filming of the episode took place, however, in the 19th-century mining village at Blists Hill Open Air Museum in Ironbridge.

== History ==
=== Medieval ===
According to Jennifer Morrison there is no recorded evidence of early human activity at Killingworth. She asserts that this may be due in part to a lack of fieldwork in the area. Subsequent mining, spoil heaps and landscaping disturbed the stratigraphy and damaged or destroyed artifacts.

Documentary evidence for Killingworth starts in 1242 when it is recorded as part of the land held by Roger de Merlay III. There were nine recorded taxpayers in 1296, falling to eight by 1312. In a survey of the township dated 1373 listed sixteen tenements (land holdings).

=== Division ===
Other enclosed land was kept as common land; 1,800 acres (730 ha) formed Killingworth Moor. The commoners were the owners of land in Killingworth and Longbenton. Prior to enclosure Newcastle races were held on the moor from the early 17th century. Racing eventually transferred to Newcastle Town Moor.

=== 19th century ===
The 1841 Census recorded a population of 112 spread through 14 dwellings. The village consisted of two rows of cottages on both sides of the road. By the mid-nineteenth century a terrace had appeared, possibly connected with the developing mines in Killingworth and surrounding areas. To the north farms persisted. This pattern of development with 18th and 19th century stone buildings is identifiable today, though with recent infilling.

=== New town ===
Construction of Killingworth, a new town, began in 1963. Intended for 20,000 people, it was a former mining community, formed on 760 acres (310 ha) of derelict colliery land near Killingworth Village. The building of Killingworth Township was undertaken by Northumberland County Council and was not formally a 'New Town' sponsored by the Government.

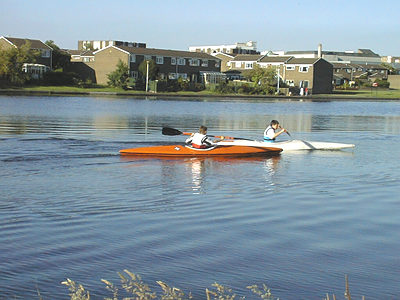
Killingworth boating lake, 2 May 2006

Unlike that town, Killingworth's planners adopted a radical approach to town centre design, resulting in relatively high-rise buildings in an avant-garde and brutalist style that won awards for architecture, dynamic industry and attractive environment.

This new town centre consisted of pre-cast concrete houses, with millions of small crustacean shells unusually embedded into their external walls, 5 to 10-storey flats, offices, industrial units and service buildings, which often consisted of artistic non-functional characteristics, shops and residential multi-storey car parks, interconnected by ramps and walkways. These made up a deck system of access to shopping and other facilities, employing the Swedish Skarne method of construction.

Originally named Killingworth Township, the latter part was quickly dropped through lack of colloquial use. Killingworth is referred to as 'Killy' by many residents of the town and surrounding areas.

Around 1964, during the reclamation of the derelict pit sites, a 15-acre (6.1 ha) lake south of the town centre was created; spoil heaps were leveled, seeded and planted with semi-mature trees. Today, swans, ducks and local wildlife live around the two lakes, which span the main road into Killingworth. The lake is kept well stocked with fish and an angling club and model boating club regularly use it.

== Killingworth Colliery ==
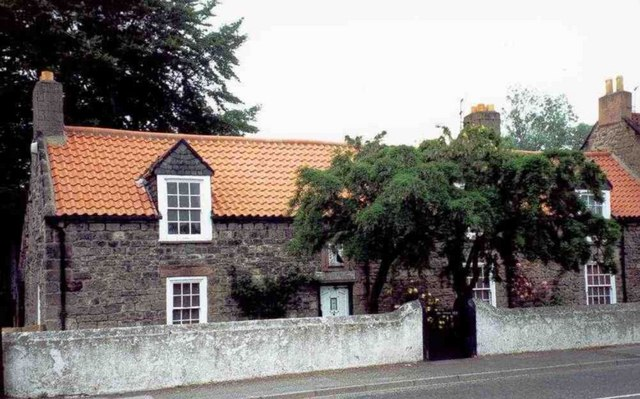
Dial Cottage

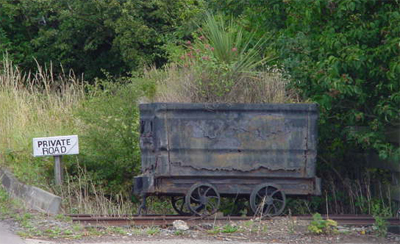
Coal wagon, Killingworth

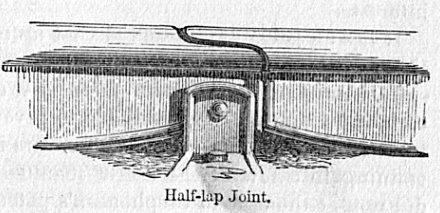
Fishbelly rail with half-lap joint, patented by Stephenson 1816

Killingworth was home to a number of pits including the world-famous Killingworth Colliery owned by Lord Ravensworth. Ralph Dodds as Chief Viewer managed or trained several people of note during his lifetime including his nephew Isaac Dodds, locomotive engineer George Stephenson, rack railway inventor John Blenkinsop, and Nicholas Wood who was to succeed him as Chief Viewer at Killingworth.

In 1814 George Stephenson, enginewright at the colliery, built his first locomotive Blücher with the help and encouragement of his manager, Nicholas Wood, in the colliery workshop behind his house 'Dial Cottage' on Lime Road. This locomotive could haul 30 long tons (33.6 short tons; 30.5 t) of coal up a hill at 4 mph (6.4 km/h). It was used to tow coal wagons along the wagonway from Killingworth to the Wallsend coal staithes. Although Blücher did not survive long, it provided Stephenson with the knowledge and experience to build better locomotives for use both at Killingworth and elsewhere. Later he would build the famous Rocket in his locomotive works in Newcastle.

At the same time Stephenson was developing his own version of the miner's safety lamp, which he demonstrated underground in Killingworth pit a month before Sir Humphry Davy presented his design to the Royal Society in London in 1815. Known as the Geordie lamp it was to be widely used in the North-east in place of the Davy lamp.

The track gauge of the Killingworth tramway was 4 ft 8 in (1,422 mm). Other names were Killingworth Colliery railway, Killingworth Railway and Killingworth wagonway

== Housing ==
=== The Garth Estates ===
Killingworth originally consisted of local authority houses. The first houses at Angus Close, owned by the local authority, were built to house key workers for the British Gas Research Centre. The rest of Killingworth's estates were cul-de-sacs named "Garths" – all numbered, although Garths 1–3 never existed. The numbering was: 4, 6, 7, 9, 11, 12, 13, etc. In the 1990s the Garths located in West Bailey changed their names to street names with estates adopting patterns such as trees (Laburnum Court, Willow Gardens), birds (Dove Close, Chaffinch Way), Farne Islands (Crumstone Court, Longstone, Megstone), etc.

The houses in most of the Garths in West Bailey (the west of Killingworth) were built of concrete and had flat roofs, but around 1995 the Local Housing Association modernised these houses by adding pitched roofs. They renewed fencing, built new brick sheds and relocated roads and pathways.

The lowest remaining numbered Garth is Garth Four in West Bailey and the highest is Garth Thirty-Three in East Bailey aka Hadrian court. The housing estate formally known as Garth 21 was built as a private estate with detached and semi-detached 3 and 4 bed room homes.

Many Local Authority Homes were purchased by the tenants, some of whom still reside in the houses that were built in the 1960s.

=== Private Estates ===
In the early 1970s, construction started on two new private estates. One north of East Bailey built by Fisher, called Longmeadows with streets named after the Farne Islands (Knivestone, Goldstone, Crumstone etc.), and the other, on the North side of West Bailey. This estate, called Highfields, was constructed by Greensit & Barrett with its streets named after notable battles Flodden, Agincourt, Stamford, Culloden and Sedgemoor.

== The Towers ==
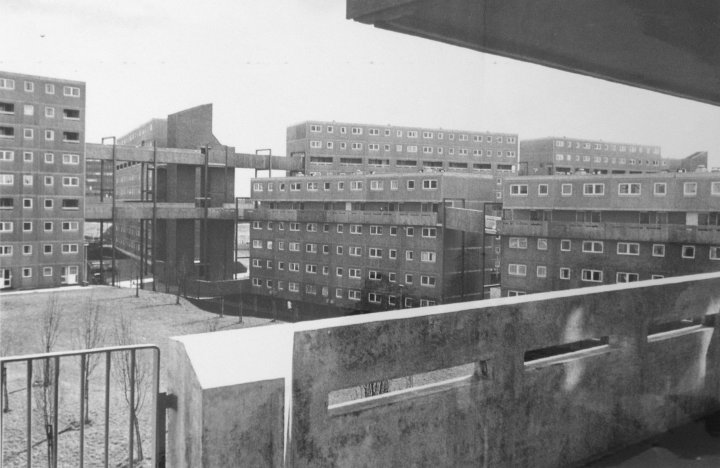
The Towers in the 1970s

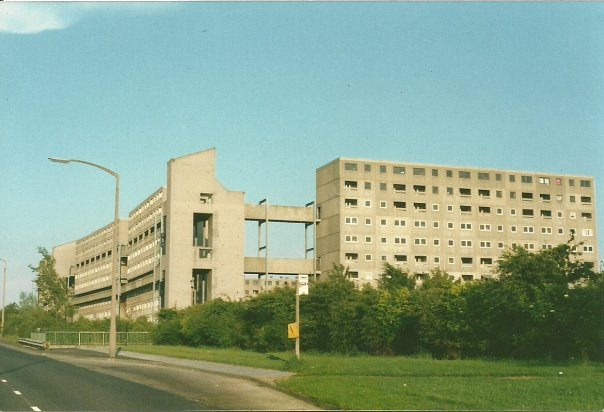
The Towers just prior to demolition in 1987

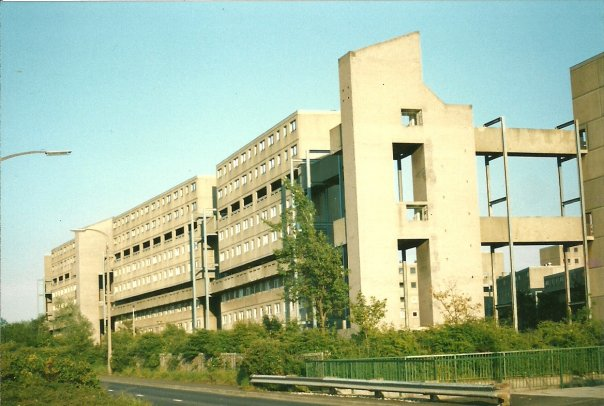
The Towers again just prior to demolition in 1987

The most eye-catching and radical aspect of the township was the 3-tier housing estate called Killingworth Towers – apartment blocks built in the early 1970s. Tenanted by the local authority, they were made of dark grey concrete blocks and were named Bamburgh, Kielder and Ford Tower etc., after castles. They consisted of a combination of 1, 2 and 3 storey homes built on top of each other rising to 10 storeys in some towers, with tremendous views.

The estate was originally designed to mimic a medieval castle with an outer wall and inner keep connected to lifts and rubbish chutes by ramps and a two-tier walkway (see gallery). This design could be seen on maps of the Towers imprinted on the cast-iron drain covers within the estate. The walkways all led to a 1/4-mile-long (400 m) elevated walkway leading straight through the mostly covered Killingworth Citadel Shopping Centre. This communal configuration was experimental and somewhat typical of the time.

=== Decline ===
The concept was to create community interaction, with large parks in the grasslands around the towers and adult social clubs. The design did not live up to expectations and the estate started to look and feel like a prison rather than a castle with the introduction of measures to stop anti-social behaviour from youths congregating within the tower instead of in the parks.

Grating was retrofitted to prevent risk takers sliding down the 100 ft (30 m) high girders holding up the walkways. Cast iron grilles were erected to stop transit by over-exuberant youths racing bikes and skateboards along the smooth walkway "racetrack". Dogs fouled the walkways, rubbish chutes were blocked, vandals damaged communal bins, stairwells, lifts and multi-storey residential car parks joined the list of problems. The Towers were never widely popular and were demolished in 1987.

The last remaining structure, the walkway to the shops, was eventually demolished as it served no purpose after the Towers' demise, but it stood alone for 10 years until funds were found to bring it down.

The land is now occupied by two new estates of privately owned homes built by Cussins Homes and Barratt Homes.

== Town centre ==
The original town centre was built in the 1960s. The boxer Henry Cooper declared the shopping centre open while standing on the steps of the Puffing Billy pub. The centre included a large department store, Woolco that sold groceries and car parts and even incorporated a tyre service bay.

=== History of commerce ===
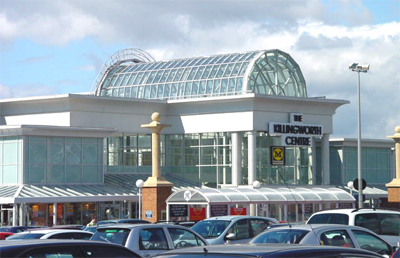
The Killingworth Centre, 2 May 2006

The first two shops in Killingworth in the 1960s were Moore's and a small confectionery shop, situated between Garth Six and Angus Close and adjacent to the West House pub, but these shops were demolished in the 1970s.

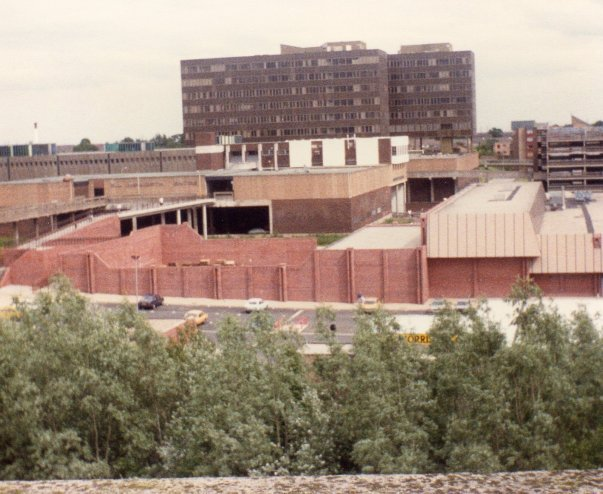
The Killingworth Centre with Amberly House in the background, Spring/Summer 1987

The shopping centre included Dewhurst butchers, Greggs bakery and newsagents, but it was demolished in the 1990s. The Puffing Billy Pub was built on a bridge over the road.

In the 1980s and 1990s, Morrisons shopping complex (containing Morrisons supermarket) became the commercial centre, while the former Woolco site stood as wasteland for more than a decade. In the early 2000s, Killingworth Centre, a modern shopping mall, was built there. Morrisons moved into a new purpose-built store.

=== White Swan Centre ===
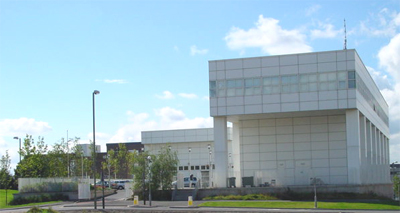
White Swan Centre, 8 May 2006

The White Swan was a large white building in the town centre. It was originally owned by Merz & McLellan and built in the 1960s. It contains 100,000 square feet (10,000 m^{2}) of office space and employed 600 professional and clerical people. It was constructed by Northumberland County Council, and the building towered over Killingworth.

Over the years, the office space became vacant and, like the former Woolco site, was disused through the 1990s. The building was reduced in height, remodernised, reopened and renamed White Swan Centre. The name White Swan was chosen from suggestions provided by local school children and reflects the swans found on the local lake. The White Swan Centre was built to house local services previously provided in demolished buildings that had been attached to the high-level shopping precinct. For example, a doctors' surgery and library and a small gym was housed in the White Swan centre as the swimming pool and sports centre had also been demolished. The new Lakeside swimming pool and sports centre was built alongside the lake next to George Stephenson High School.

== Transport ==
Killingworth lies within the remit of the North East Joint Transport Committee and the Tyne and Wear Passenger Transport Executive (Nexus).

Killingworth Bus Station is located adjacent to the Killingworth Centre. It is served by Arriva North East, Go North East, and Stagecoach North East with routes to Newcastle upon Tyne, North Tyneside and Northumberland.

== Schools ==
Killingworth is home to Bailey Green, Grasmere Academy and Amberley primary schools and George Stephenson High School. In recent years Killingworth moved from a three-tier education system consisting of, First, Middle and High schools, to a two-tier system.
