= Benton Metro station =

Tyne and Wear Metro station in North Tyneside

Benton
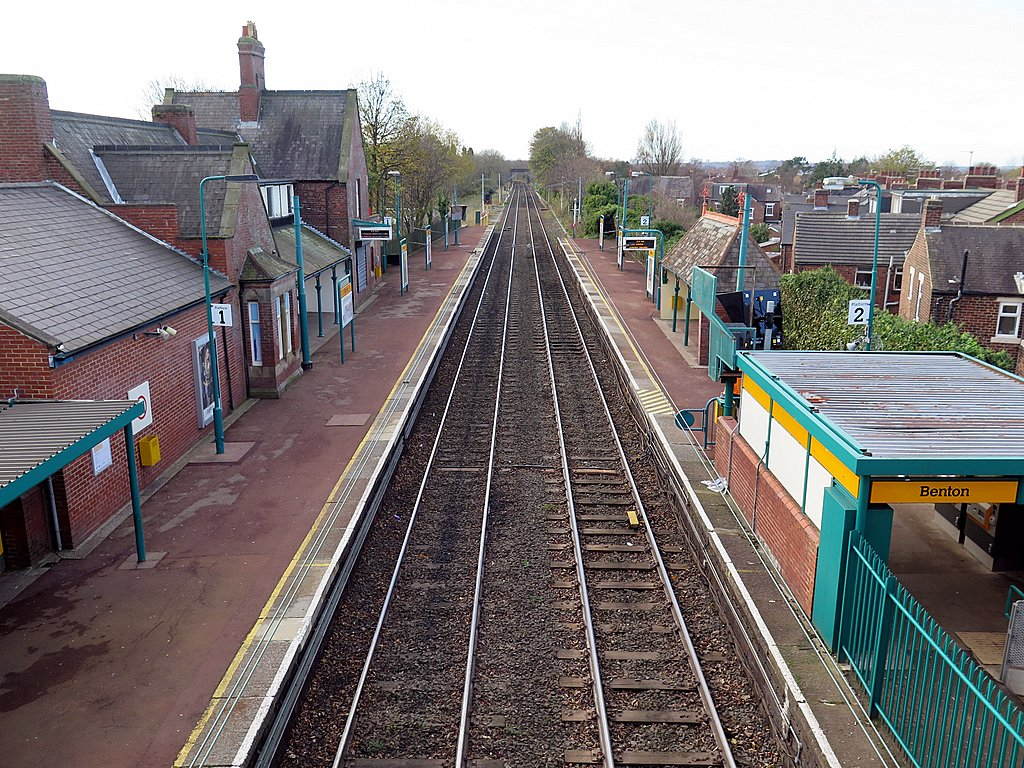

General information
- Location: Benton, North Tyneside; England
- Coordinates: 55°00′50″N 1°34′03″W
- Grid reference: NZ277688
- System: Tyne and Wear Metro station
- Transit authority: Tyne and Wear PTE
- Platforms: 2
- Tracks: 2

Construction
- Parking: 10 spaces
- Cycle facilities: 5 cycle pods
- Accessible: Step-free access to platform

Other information
- Station code: BTN
- Fare zone: B

History
- Original company: Blyth and Tyne Railway
- Pre-grouping: North Eastern Railway
- Post-grouping: London and North Eastern Railway; British Rail (Eastern Region)

Key dates
- 27 June 1864: Line opened
- 1 March 1871: Station opened
- 23 January 1978: Closed for conversion
- 11 August 1980: Reopened

Passengers
- 2024/25: 0.553 million

Services
Preceding station	Tyne and Wear Metro	Following station
Four Lane Ends towards South Shields	Yellow line	Palmersville towards St James via Whitley Bay
Location
- Location within Tyne and Wear

Benton is a Tyne and Wear Metro station, and former British Rail station, serving the suburb of Benton, North Tyneside in Tyne and Wear, England. It was opened in 1871, closed in 1978 for conversion to become part of the Tyne and Wear Metro, and joined that network in 1980.

It should not be confused with a previous station, on the site of the current Four Lane Ends Interchange, which opened in 1864, closed in 1871, and was variously called Benton, Long Benton and Longbenton. Nor should it be confused with Forest Hall station on the East Coast Main Line, which opened in 1856, closed in 1958, and was known as Benton until 1874.

== History ==
The line through the station was opened on 27 June 1864 by the Blyth and Tyne Railway, but there was no station at the site until 1 March 1871, when the earlier Benton station, on the site now occupied by the Four Lane Ends Interchange, was closed and replaced by a station at the current site. On the same date, the short-lived Forest Hall station, situated on the Blyth and Tyne some 0.5 miles (0.80 km) to the east, also closed.

Benton station was acquired by the North Eastern Railway (NER) in 1874, along with the rest of the Blythe and Tyne Railway. The first electric train called at the station on 29 March 1904.

The station was closed on 23 January 1978 to enable the conversion of the line to become part of the Tyne and Wear Metro. It reopened on 11 August 1980, following the opening of the first phase of the metro, between Haymarket and Tynemouth via Four Lane Ends. Prior to the network's extension to Wearside in March 2002, Benton was a terminus station of the former Red Line, which operated between Pelaw and Benton, as well as an intermediate station on the Yellow Line.

During conversion, some of the station's structures were retained. The original station building on the westbound platform now serves as a private residence. The brick-built slate roofed shelter on the north platform (eastbound) has been retained from the original station and features "iron columns and decorative iron finials on the roof." The shelter is now part of the Tyne and Wear Historic Environment Record.

The station was used by 348,120 passengers in 2017–18.

== Facilities ==
The station has two side platforms, with the main, level, access to the southern (westbound) platform. Access between the platforms is by the station footbridge, with both stairs and lifts to each platform. There is also a steep ramped access to the northern (eastbound) platform.

A small free car park is available, adjacent to the southern entrance, with ten spaces, plus two accessible spaces. There is also the provision for cycle parking, with five cycle pods available for use.

The station is equipped with ticket machines, waiting shelter, seating, next train information displays, timetable posters, and an emergency help point on both platforms. Ticket machines are able to accept payment with credit and debit card (including contactless payment), notes and coins. The station is also fitted with smartcard validators, which feature at all stations across the network.

== Services ==
As of October 2024, the station is served by up to five trains per hour on weekdays and Saturday, and up to four trains per hour during the evening and on Sunday. In the eastbound direction, trains run to St James via Whitley Bay. In the westbound direction, trains run to South Shields via Monument.
