= Wideopen =

Village in Tyne and Wear, England

Coordinates: 55.050°N 1.624°W

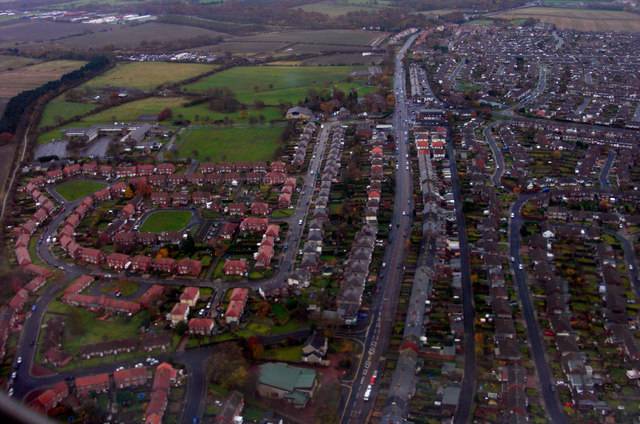
- Aerial view

- Location within Tyne and Wear
- Population: 9,145
- OS grid reference: NZ241728
- Metropolitan borough: North Tyneside
- Metropolitan county: Tyne and Wear
- Region: North East
- Country: England
- Sovereign state: United Kingdom
- Post town: NEWCASTLE UPON TYNE
- Postcode district: NE13
- Dialling code: 0191
- Police: Northumbria
- Fire: Tyne and Wear
- Ambulance: North East
- UK Parliament: Cramlington & Killingworth

Wideopen, also occasionally misspelled as Wide Open, is a village in the North Tyneside metropolitan borough of Tyne and Wear, England, around 5 miles (8.0 km) north of Newcastle.

Wideopen adjoins the settlements of Seaton Burn, Brunswick Village and Hazlerigg. The village straddles the historic Great North Road, formerly the A1 trunk road, but is now bypassed by a new alignment of the A1 immediately to the west. The village lies in an area with a strong mining history and had its own colliery. Weetslade Country Park, to the east of the village, is reclaimed from an extensive area of coal mining activity.

In 2012 work commenced on the building of a new housing estate by Bellway homes, called Five Mile Park. It is located to the east of the Great North Road, between Lockey Park and Weetslade Country Park. The name refers to the distance from the centre of Newcastle; similarly, there is a Three Mile Inn to the south, and a Six Mile Bridge to the north.

== History ==
The village is present on an 1860s Ordnance Survey map as 'Wide Open', with the settlements of 'East Wideopen' to the east, and 'West Wideopen' to the south. The village name is nowadays written as one word in widespread use and appears on signage at either end of the village, but the alternative form of Wide Open is still occasionally found on maps and elsewhere. This leads to an inconsistency in contemporary addresses.

=== Wideopen Colliery ===
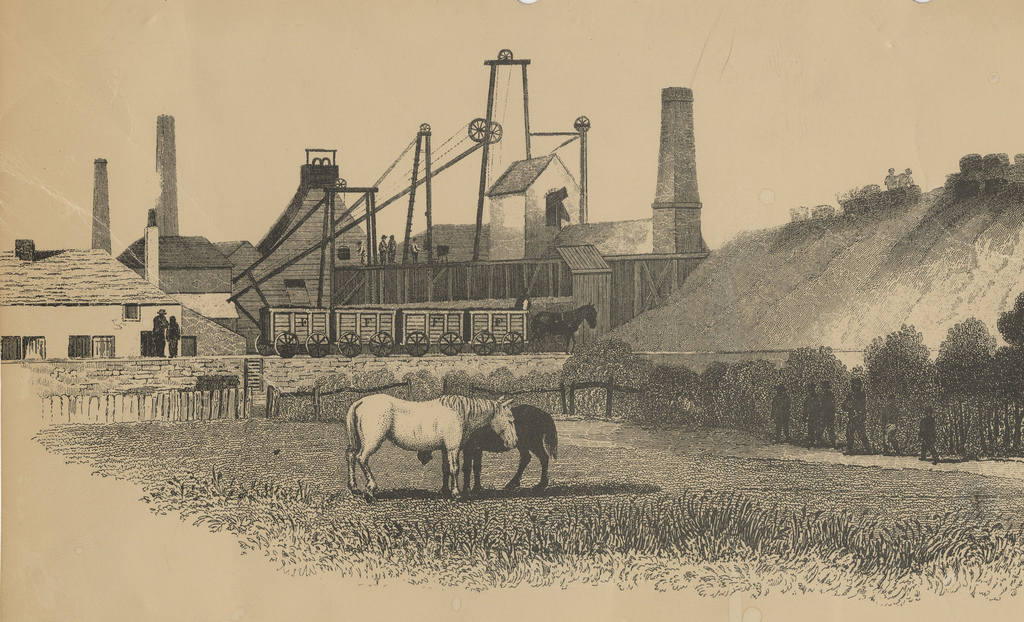
Drawing by Thomas Harrison Fair, 1844

The pit shafts for the colliery were sunk and opened by Perkins and Thackrah in 1825. The colliery produced its first coal in May 1827. The coal was transported by the Fawdon Wagonway to Scotswood. The colliery was sketched by Thomas Harrison Hair in 1844 as part of his collection. There was for many years a scrapyard on the site, but this closed in 2011 to make way for new housing.

=== Sacred Heart Church ===
To the south of the village is the 19th-century Sacred Heart RC Church, a Grade II listed building notable for its stained glass windows, which bear designs by Pre-Raphaelite artists Edward Burne-Jones, Ford Madox Brown and William Morris.

Other churches in Wideopen are St Columba's, the Anglican parish church, and St John's URC church.

== Governance ==
The village is in the metropolitan borough of North Tyneside, in the county of Tyne and Wear. It has been in the Parliamentary constituency of North Tyneside since the creation of the constituency in 1997.

== Amenities ==
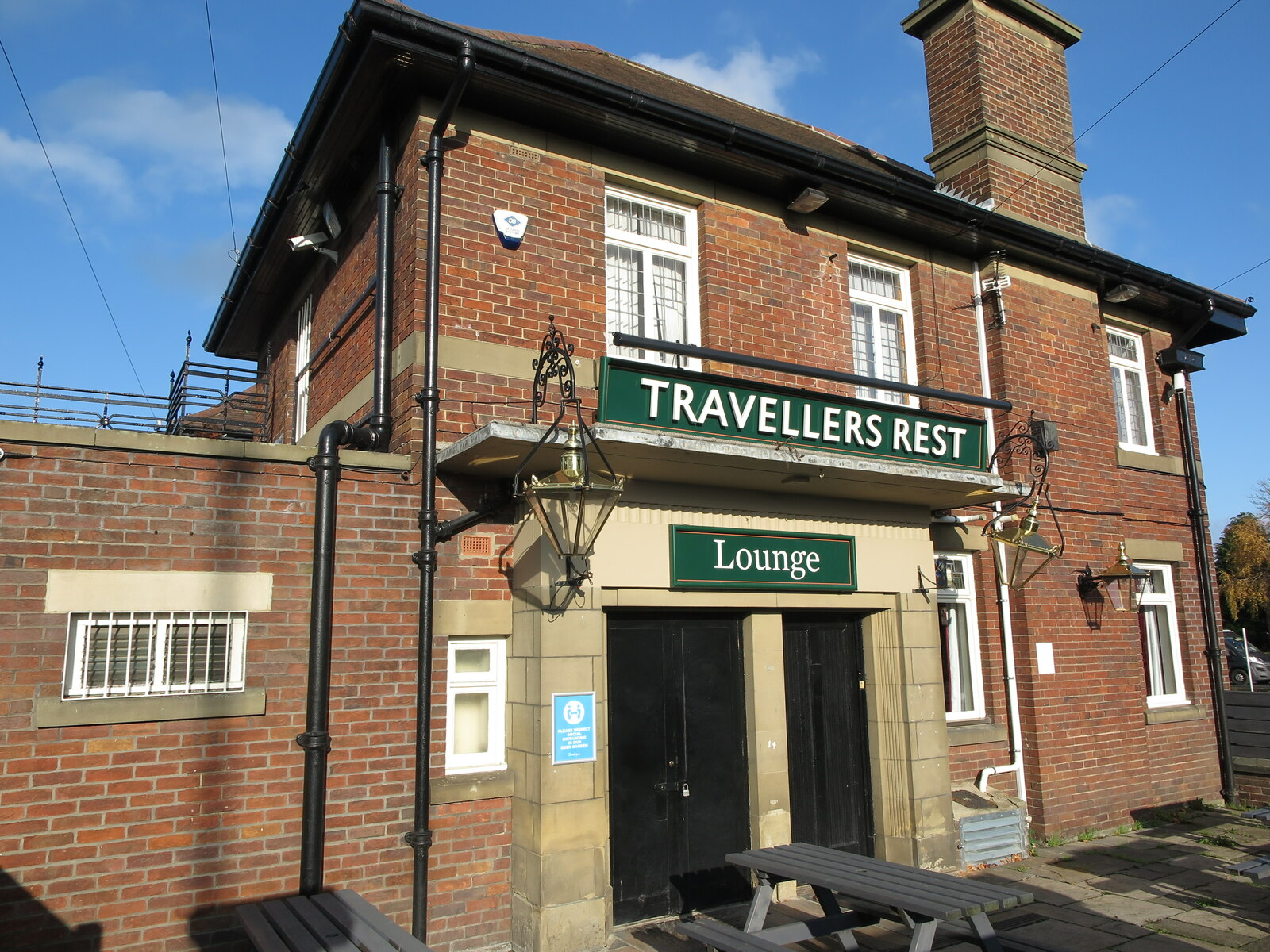
Pub

The village contains one pub (Previously The Travellers Rest, now Coach & Horses), two health centres, dentist, library, garage, supermarket, post office, an ambulance station and various local shops. The village also has two primary schools, Hazlewood Primary School and Greenfields Community Primary School; students in these schools normally progress to secondary education at North Gosforth Academy.

=== Recreation and leisure ===
The village has a local football club – Wideopen Juniors, playing with teams from seniors down to under 8's. The club is based at Lockey Park and has modern changing facilities built in 2008.

Woodlands Hall provides indoor leisure facilities and Wideopen swimming pool (within the grounds of Greenfields Primary School) is used as a school learner pool.

The Reivers Cycle Route runs past the village providing access to a nationally designated cycle route from the east to west coast of England. The village is directly connected to the local waggonways network (former mineral railways) which provides opportunities for walking and cycling routes throughout North Tyneside.

A driving range, The John Jacobs Golf centre, opened in 1966. This later became Wideopen Golf Club when an 18-hole course was opened in 1984. In 1986 the club changed its name to Parklands Golf Club, but occupies the same area within Gosforth Park.

=== Conservation Area ===
Lying on the outskirts of the village, Wideopen Conservation Area was designated in January 2007 and a character appraisal was adopted in January 2009 by North Tyneside Council. The area includes the Grade II listed Sacred Heart Roman Catholic church.

=== Transport ===
The village is served by regular buses running into Newcastle upon Tyne city centre and Blyth town centre. Proximity to the A1 and A19 affords easy access to national road transport links. National rail travel, via the East Coast Main Line, is available at Newcastle station.

== Notable people ==
- David Hagan (born 1966), cricketer
