= Sacred Heart Church, North Gosforth =

Sacred Heart Church
- Sacred Heart Catholic Church
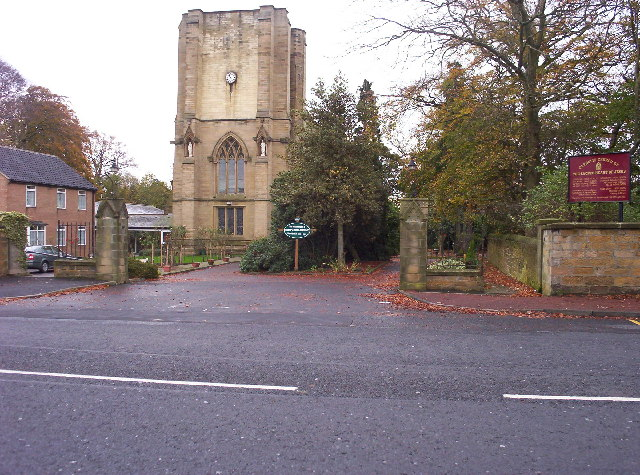

- Location of Sacred Heart RC Church in Tyne and Wear
- 55.0407°N 1.6209°W
- OS grid reference: NZ 24322 71866
- Location: North Gosforth
- Country: England
- Denomination: Roman Catholic
- Website: http://www.sacredheartng.org.uk/

History
- Former name: Anglican church of St Mary
- Dedicated: 24 June 1912

Architecture
- Heritage designation: Grade II
- Designated: 18 October 2006
- Style: Early English Gothic
- Completed: 1860s

Administration
- Diocese: Roman Catholic Diocese of Hexham and Newcastle
- Parish: Sacred Heart Parish, North Gosforth

Clergy
- Priest: Father Michael Weymes

The Sacred Heart Church is a Roman Catholic church and ecclesiastical parish in North Gosforth, Newcastle upon Tyne. It is part of the Roman Catholic Diocese of Hexham and Newcastle. Situated between Wideopen village to the north and Gosforth Park to the south, the church was made a Grade II listed building in 2006. It is notable for its stained glass windows bearing designs by members of the Pre-Raphaelite Brotherhood, in particular Sir Edward Burne-Jones.

== History ==
=== St Mary's Church ===
The church is a 19th-century former Anglican church, built and donated by Thomas Eustace Smith in the 1860s, and named St Mary's. Use of the church fell following the more general use of St Columba's church in Seaton Burn, which was closer to most of the parish, and the church later closed.

=== Sacred Heart Church ===
The church was bought in 1911 by Bishop Richard Collins, Bishop of the Roman Catholic Diocese of Hexham and Newcastle and endowed to the Diocese. Mass was first led by the Bishop on 28 January 1912, and the church was formally dedicated to the Sacred Heart on 24 June 1912.

==== List of Incumbent Priests ====
Date	Incumbent
1912–1918	George C. Jeffreys (Note: Curate of St. Aidan's RC Church, Benton.)
1918–1921	C. Bede Tuohey
1922–1925	Charles Hart
1925–1926	None (Note: Served from St Charles Church, Gosforth.)
1926–1937	Charles Hart
1930–1937	C. Bede Tuohey
1937–1948	William T Harris
1948–1949	James O'Brien
1949–1962	James Phelan
1962–1964	William McKenna
1964–1984	Edward Ord
1984–2000	Thomas Cass
2000–2008	Joseph Travers
2008–2020	James Dunne
2020–2022	William Agley (Note: Also priest of St Charles Church, Gosforth.)
2022–present	Michael Weymes (Note: Also priest of St Charles Church, Gosforth.)

== Architecture ==
Built in the 1860s, the church is designed in the Early English Gothic style, although much of the masonry is brick rather than more traditional stone. The architect is unknown, but due to a number of similarities to the church of Baldersby St James in North Yorkshire, the parish believes that it is the work of William Butterfield or one of his students.

=== Stained glass windows ===
The church is notable for its stained glass windows, bearing designs by Pre-Raphaelite artists Edward Burne-Jones, Ford Madox Brown and William Morris.

== See also ==
- St Mary's Cathedral
- Holy Name parish, Jesmond
