= John Ogilvy of Powrie =

John Ogilvy of Powrie (died 1609) was a Scottish landowner and political agent. He was the son of Gilbert Ogilvy of that Ilk and Powrie and Sibilla Drummond, daughter of David Drummond, 2nd Lord Drummond and Margaret Stewart, the natural daughter of Alexander Stewart of Pitcairn, Bishop of Moray and Margaret Stewart, who was the illegitimate daughter of James IV of Scotland by his mistress, Margaret Drummond.

== Biography ==
He was known as "Pury Ogilvie" from the family lands. The lands were at Easter Powrie, the ruined Powrie Castle was part of the estate of Wester Powrie. His father, Gilbert Ogilvy, sold Easter Powrie to James Durham of Pitkerro in 1593. The castle at Easter Powrie was later named Wedderburn Castle, and demolished in the 19th century.

John Ogilvy's sister Anne Ogilvy married the courtier Sir Thomas Erskine. His father Gilbert Ogilvy died in 1600, and John wrote to the Bishop of Durham asking for black cloth for mourning clothes.

Ogilgvy sent political information to Francis Walsingham, and in 1595 pretended to be an agent of James VI to Catholic powers in Europe.

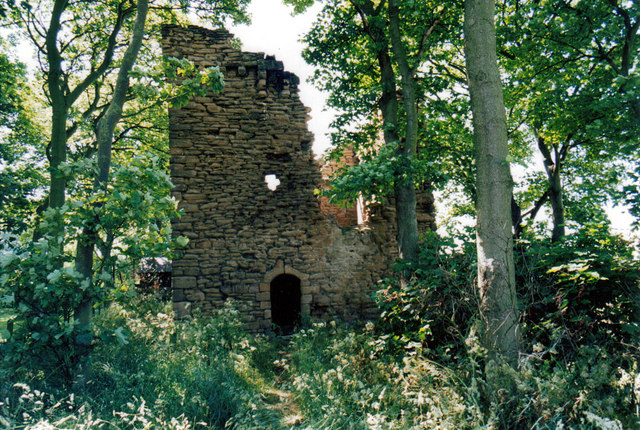
John Ogilvy was exiled in England at Burradon Tower in 1601

In October 1598 James VI was convinced that Ogilvy had leaked or passed invented diplomat instructions to England purporting to be his directions for diplomats in Spain and at the Vatican. Elizabeth I had confronted the Scottish diplomat David Foulis with these disputed papers.

Ogilvy was questioned in March 1601, briefly imprisoned in Edinburgh Castle, and after going to Dunfermline to see the king, went into exile in England.

Ogilvie sent news of the Scottish court to Sir Robert Cecil in England, assuming the name "John Gibson". Ogilvy peppered his letters with Latin quotations from the classics. He refers to himself as "PO". He described the factions at court of the adherents of James VI and his wife Anne of Denmark. In May 1601, he reported that Anne of Denmark was angry with his brother-in-law, Sir Thomas Erskine because of jealousy, like Juno's after the Judgement of Paris, or because Erskine supported Sir George Home and Sir David Murray, who she counted as enemies. Ogilvy's troubles included a quarrel over property with his wife and father-in-law. He was staying in Northumberland with Oliver Ogle at Burradon and Causey Park.

He wrote to James VI referring to the meeting at Dunfermline, and claiming not to have had underhand dealings abroad.

John Ogilvy died in 1609.

== Marriage and children ==
John married Elizabeth Scrimgeour, a daughter of Sir James Scrimgeour, Constable of Dundee. John and Elizabeth appear to have had five daughters and four sons.

- Margaret Ogilvy, who married Sir Duncan Campbell, 4th Laird of Glenlyon
- Isobel Ogilvy, who married Kenneth Mackenzie, First Lord Mackenzie Kintail
- Gilbert Ogilvy of Powrie - died without issue
- Magdalen Ogilvy married David Ogilvy of Bellaty, first son of David Ogilvy of Bellaty
- Thomas Ogilvy of Powrie, who married Margaret Herriot. He left no surviving male heir on his death about 1660, so he was the last Ogilvy of that Ilk holding the lands from which the family took its name and had held from 1172.
- Sibilla Ogilvy, who married (1) John Butter, (2) Sir John Falconer, Master of the Scottish Mint, who was the younger brother of Sir Alexander Falconer, 1st Lord Falconer of Halkerton.
- Elizabeth Ogilvy, who married James Ogilvy, second son of David Ogilvy of Bellaty
- James Ogilvy, he was witness to his brother Thomas's served heir to his grandfather, Sir Gilbert Ogilvy, on 24 Feb 1617. Little else is known about him.
- Kenneth Ogilvy, mentioned in his mother's testament in 1613 but probably died young.
