= Fawdon Wagonway =

Coordinates: 55.0236°N 1.644°W

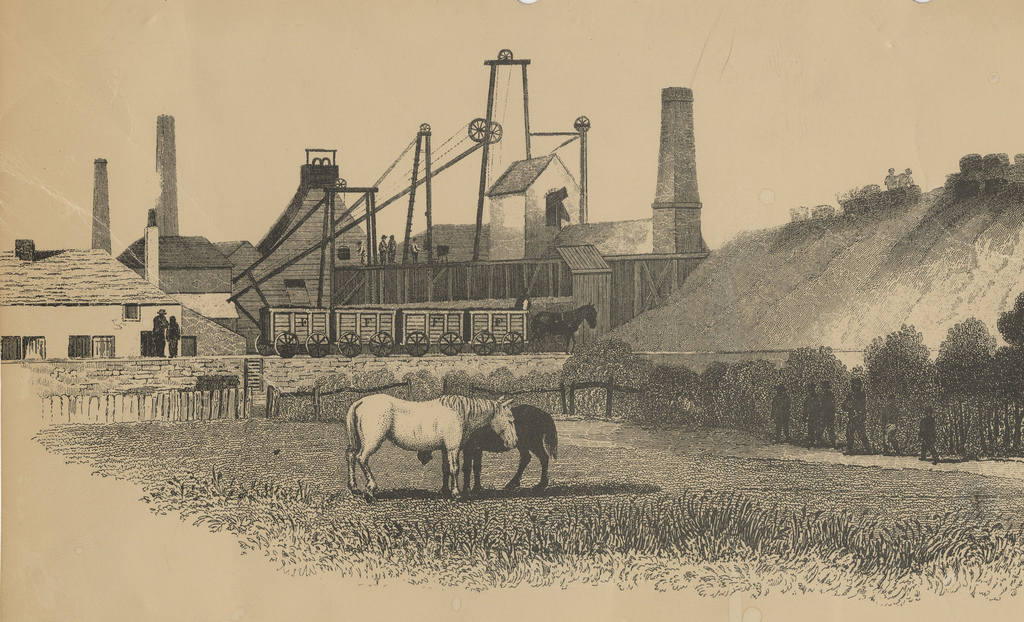

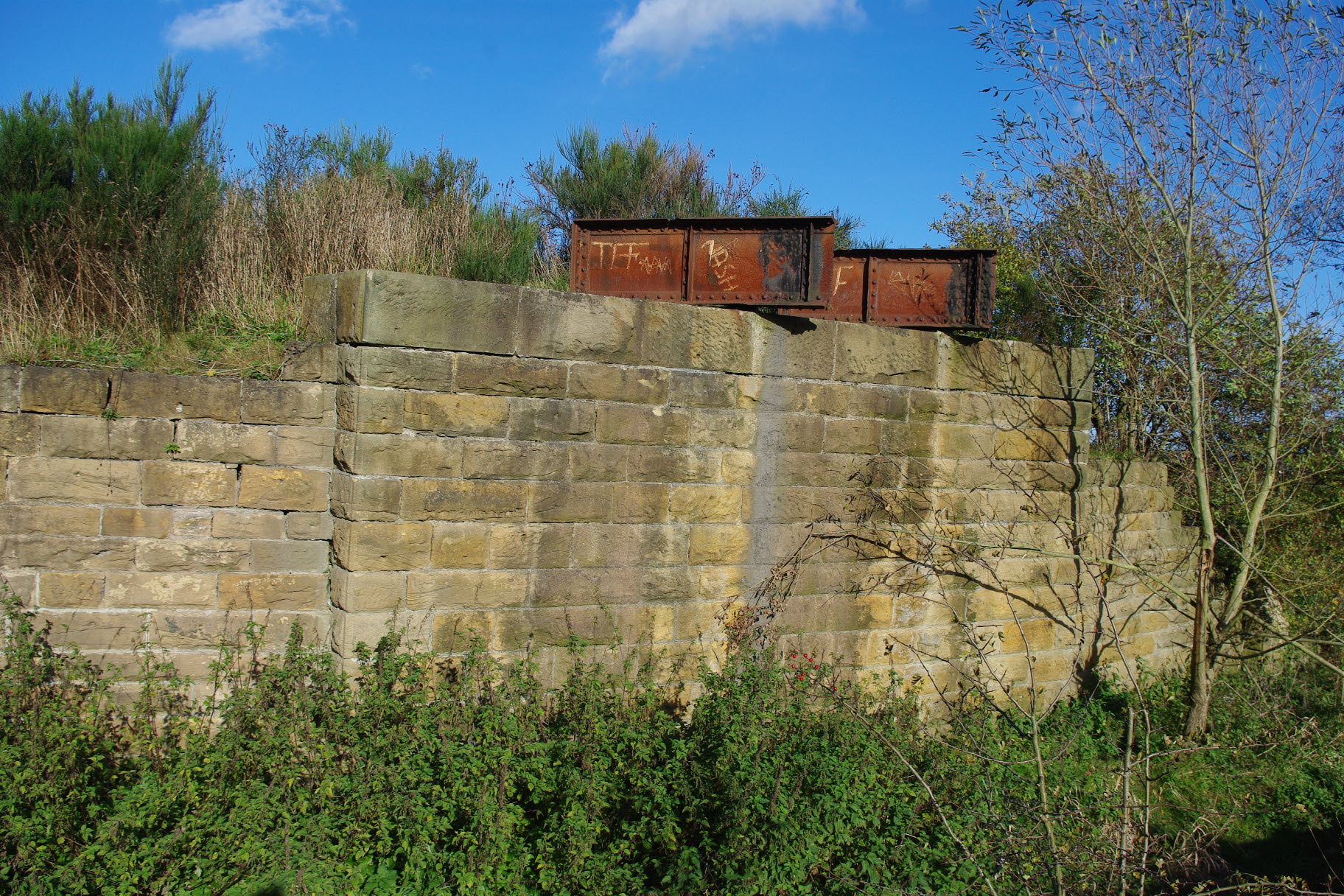
- Drawing by Thomas Harrison Hair of Wideopen Colliery from 1844, and remnants of a dismantled railway bridge, 2005

Overview
- Dates of operation: 1818–1826

Technical
- Length: 1.375 miles (2.213 km)

The Fawdon Wagonway was from 1818 to 1826 a 1 mile 3 furlongs (2.2 km) long horse-drawn and partially rope-operated industrial railway in Fawdon near Newcastle upon Tyne. It was the first cable car employing a moving rope that could be picked up or released by a grip on the cars.

== History ==
Fawdon Colliery was set-up around 1810, and its coal was originally transported via the Kenton and Coxlodge Waggonway to Wallsend. In 1818, the Fawdon Wagonway was built by Benjamin Thompson, one of the colliery's owning partners, on a new route to Scotswood. The line used inclined planes and stationary steam engines. The re-routing was the cause of controversial discussions between Thompson and the owners of the properties, over which the track ran.

Thompson installed a series of stationary steam engines along the 1 mile 3 furlongs (2.2 km) rail track between the Kenton Bank and Hotchpudding Planes. (Note: Hotch Pudding is a historic name for an area of land to the north of modern-day West Denton.) Stationary steam engines transported the coal wagons through the hilly landscape at a speed of 7 miles per hour (11 km/h).

Each rope ran between two steam engines and could be alternately wound onto drums at the ends by the engines. Its length corresponded to twice the distance between the steam engines. The rope could be clamped by a grip that looked like a vice attached to the carriage. At the point where the railway crossed a public road, the rope was guided by friction rollers down a cable duct and under a plank bridge to the other side of the road, where it again rose above the ground. Before the car came to the public road, the boy who rode on it released the rope from the vice. The momentum of the car carried it across the road, and the boy hung the rope back into the vice as the car continued its movement.

The inclined plane was used until 1826, when the Brunton and Shields Wagonway (later Seaton Burn Wagonway) was built to the River Tyne at Whitehill Point.

The routes of the Fawdon and Seaton Burn Wagonways were used in the 1890s together with the route of the Coxlodge Wagonway for building the Fawdon Railway. The 1920s Ordnance Survey map showed a new Fawdon wagonway leading to the Coxlodge Colliery Jubilee Pit. The wagonway is still preserved as a low earthwork on which an asphalt road runs. Archeological excavations were conducted in Newcastle Great Park in 2003.
