= Burradon, Tyne and Wear =

Village in Tyne and Wear, England

Coordinates: 55.048°N 1.573°W

Burradon
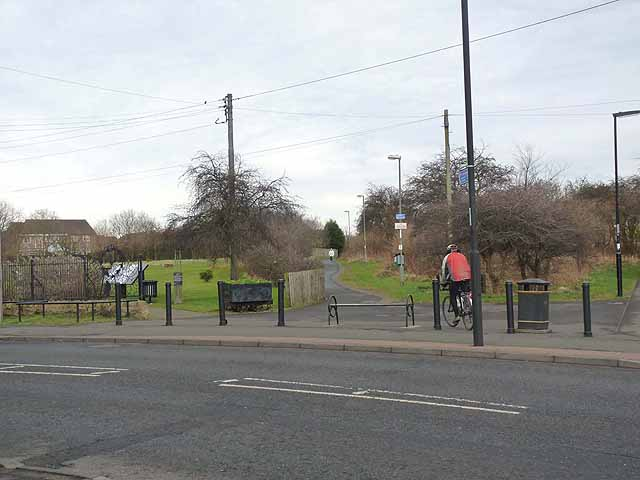

- Location within Tyne and Wear
- OS grid reference: NZ274726
- Metropolitan borough: North Tyneside
- Metropolitan county: Tyne and Wear
- Region: North East
- Country: England
- Sovereign state: United Kingdom
- Post town: CRAMLINGTON
- Postcode district: NE23
- Dialling code: 0191
- Police: Northumbria
- Fire: Tyne and Wear
- Ambulance: North East

Burradon is a village in the North Tyneside district, in the county of Tyne and Wear, England, to the north of Newcastle upon Tyne. It is adjacent to Camperdown and the two villages are closely linked. Camperdown was once known as Hazlerigge. Until 1974 it was in Northumberland.

== History ==
Burradon has been occupied since the 5th or 6th century B.C. In 1317 John de Weetslade (Camperdown) joined a rebellion against the King. The rebellion failed and John was stripped of his land, which was granted to William de Heslerigge.

Between 1820-1828 a small coal pit was sunk and marked the beginnings of the community, as it is known today. From 1829–1858 the centre and culture of village life moved from the old medieval settlement surrounding the farm to the ever expanding colliery village of Camperdown. On 2 March 1860, 76 miners were killed in a gas explosion at the colliery in Burradon. From 1895-1914 living conditions gradually improved and the mining families took control over their own affairs with the building of a Co-op store and working men's social club.

In March 1921 the Victoria Picture House was opened, it was eventually closed in 1958. The Welfare Hall was opened on 30 December 1939.

== Governance ==
Brierdean was formerly a township in the parish of Earsdon, in 1866 Burradon became a separate civil parish, on 1 April 1912 the parish was abolished and merged with Longbenton. In 1911 the parish had a population of 1310. It is now in the unparished area of Longbenton.

== Economy ==
In 1820-1828 a small coal pit was sunk by Lord Ravensworth & Partners and marked the beginnings of the community, as it is known today. From 1829–1858 the centre and culture of village life moved from the old medieval settlement surrounding the farm to the ever expanding colliery village of Camperdown. In 1860 a mining disaster made the community famous countrywide. The colliery closed in November 1975. Little remains of the colliery except for the old Seaton Burn Wagonway which was the boundary between Burradon and Camperdown.

=== Burradon Mining Disaster ===
On 2 March 1860, an explosion took place at Burradon Colliery killing seventy-six men and boys. The disaster became of national interest and significance. At this time laws were inadequate at ensuring the safe operation of collieries and the families of disaster victims would have to rely on charity rather than compensation.

The inquest and newspaper coverage of the disaster (mostly the involvement of the Newcastle Chronicle) took issue with who should be responsible for both compensation and mine safety in what was to become a hotly contested debate. A group of the more senior Burradon miners: Maddox, Carr, Urwin (and Baxter Langley, editor of the Newcastle Daily Chronicle) had been at the forefront of a campaign to set up an insurance scheme for miners hurt or killed down the pit. The mine owners procrastinated on this proposal. The mineworkers had enlisted the help, and won great respect, from the editor and owner of a local newspaper, who supported their case with everything at their disposal. The anger felt towards the mine owners and the vigour with which the subsequent trial was fought was all the greater because the disaster had been predicted.

== Landmarks ==
Burradon Tower is a ruinous tower house which is both a Scheduled Ancient Monument and a Grade II listed building. The Manor of Burradon was acquired by John Orde in 1441 when due to the devastation wrought by the Scots and the poor quality of the soil it was valued at only 20 shillings a year. The tower, originally a three storied single square bay, was probably built about 1553 by Bertram Anderson, a nephew of Orde. The property passed in 1569 to the Ogle family by whom it was extended and improved. A fireplace bears the date 1633 and the initials LO, thought to represent Lancelot Ogle who was resident at that time. Following the marriage of Jane Ogle to her cousin James Ogle of Causey Park House the tower was abandoned and by 1769 it was reported to be derelict. In the 19th century the structure was incorporated into a farm building.

== Transport ==
The United buses first started operations through Camperdown on 1 July 1936.

== Religious sites ==
The church of The Good Shepherd was dedicated on 22 January 1979.

== Notable people ==
- William Fryer (1895–1960): born William J. “Tucker” Fryer, he was an English-American footballer. Fryer was inducted into the American National Soccer (Football) Hall of Fame in 1951.

== Sources ==
- Atkinson, Frank (1979). The Great Northern Coalfield 1700-1900. Newcastle upon Tyne: Frank Graham. ISBN 0 85983 121 3.
