= Thomas Hair =

Thomas Hair may refer to:

- Thomas Harrison Hair (1808–1875), British artist, noted for depictions of 19th century coal mining
- Thomas Hair (musician) (1779–1854), British musician, noted for violin and Northumbrian smallpipes
