= John Graham (cricketer) =

English cricketer

Personal information
- Full name: John 'The G' Alexander Graham
- Born: 4 March 1978 (age 48); Newcastle-upon-Tyne, Northumberland, England
- Nickname: The Birtley Batter
- Batting: Right-handed
- Bowling: Right-arm medium

Domestic team information
- Years: Team
- 2000–2005: Northumberland

Career statistics
| Competition | List A |
|---|---|
| Matches | 4 |
| Runs scored | 78 |
| Batting average | 19.50 |
| 100s/50s | –/1 |
| Top score | 55 |
| Balls bowled | 18 |
| Wickets | – |
| Bowling average | – |
| 5 wickets in innings | – |
| 10 wickets in match | – |
| Best bowling | – |
| Catches/stumpings | 3/– |
- Source: Cricinfo, 1 August 2011

John Alexander Graham (born 4 March 1978) is an English cricketer. Graham is a right-handed batsman who bowls right-arm medium pace.

Graham started his cricket career playing Second XI cricket for Durham, which he did between 1996 and 2000. While doing so, he appeared for England Under-19s against Pakistan Under-19s during England's 1996 tour there. He played 2 Youth Test matches without success, and one Youth One Day International, in which he scored a fifty. He later made his debut for Northumberland against Bedfordshire in the 2000 Minor Counties Championship. He played Minor counties cricket for Northumberland from 2000 to 2005, making 20 Minor Counties Championship appearances and 16 MCCA Knockout Trophy appearances. He made his List A debut against Staffordshire in the 2nd round of the 2002 Cheltenham & Gloucester Trophy, which was played in 2001. He made 3 further List A appearances, the last of which came against Middlesex in the 2005 Cheltenham & Gloucester Trophy. In his 4 List A matches, he scored 78 runs at an average of 19.50, with a high score of 55. This score came against Staffordshire in 2001.

== Personal life ==
John Graham works as a geography teacher at North Gosforth Academy, Seaton Burn. He currently resides in the rural-urban fringe town of Seaton Delaval, near Newcastle upon Tyne, with his wife and their three children.

Graham is known locally for his eccentric personality and sense of humour.
