= Holy Name parish, Jesmond =

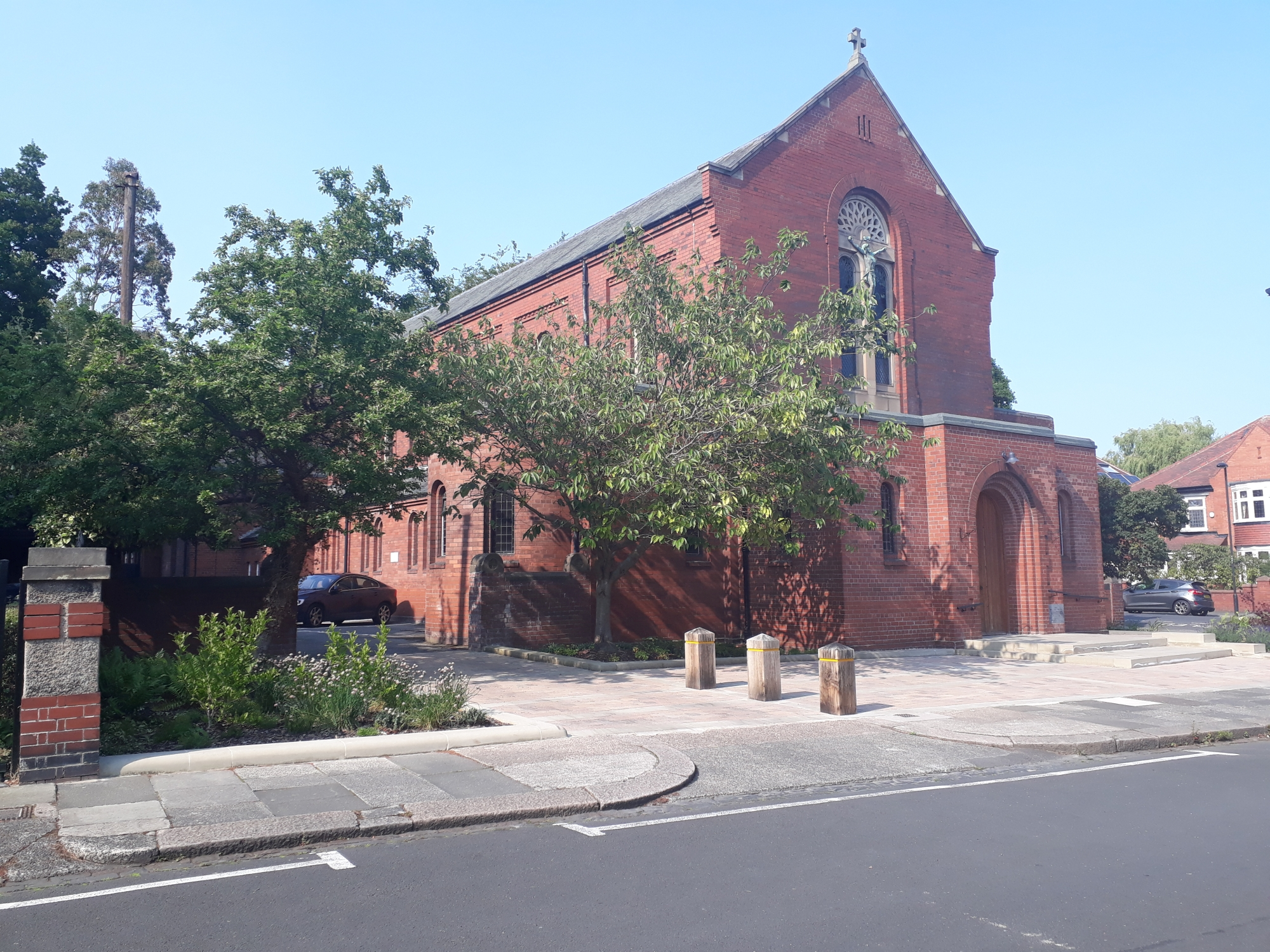
Holy Name Church

Location within Tyne and Wear

The Holy Name Church is a parish of the Roman Catholic Church located in the Jesmond suburb in Newcastle upon Tyne.

== History ==
On 1 December 1901, the parish was founded. The place of worship was established in a leased house at 68 Manor House Road. On 18 January 1903, a temporary iron church was opened on St George's Terrace. It served as the main chapel for almost 27 years. In 1922, a parish hall called "Osborne Hall" was built. Osborne Hall is now part of the Jesmond swimming baths. A new church was planned and construction began on 24 June 1928.

=== The church ===
By 1929, Holy Name Church, with a capacity for 400 people, was built. It is located at the junction of Mitchell Avenue and North Jesmond Avenue. It has several stained windows in different artistic styles. Behind the sanctuary, there are four panels containing large pictures of saints. The saints in the panels are, from left to right, St Thomas Beckett, St Thomas More, St Margaret Clitheroe, St Gabriel, St Michael, St Margaret of Scotland, St John Fisher, and St Cuthbert holding the head of St Oswald.

=== List of parish priests ===
- 1901-1904 Fr Joseph Newsham
- 1904-1950 Fr Aloysius Johnson
- 1950-1971 Fr Michael Henry
- 1971-1972 Fr Gerard Crumbley
- 1972-1978 Bp Owen Swindlehurst
- 1978-1992 Fr John White
- 1992-1994 Fr Benedict Carey
- 1994-2005 Fr Adrian Dixon
- 2005-2013 Fr Michael Whalen
- 2013–present Fr Michael Campion

== Geography ==
The Holy Name parish belongs to the deanery of St Andrew and St Anthony, in the Episcopal area of Newcastle and North Tyneside, and is part of the Diocese of Hexham and Newcastle.

To the north of the parish is St Charles's parish (South Gosforth), to the south is St Dominic's parish (Byker), to the east is Jesmond Dene, and on the west with the Town Moor. Originally, Holy Name parish included the district of Benton to the east which is now St Aidan's parish. Currently, the Holy Name serves about 200 active parishioners who attend religious services mainly during the weekends.

== See also ==
- St Mary's Cathedral
- Sacred Heart Church, North Gosforth
- Jesmond Parish Church
