= Fawdon =

Area of Newcastle upon Tyne, England

Coordinates: 55.014°N 1.645°W

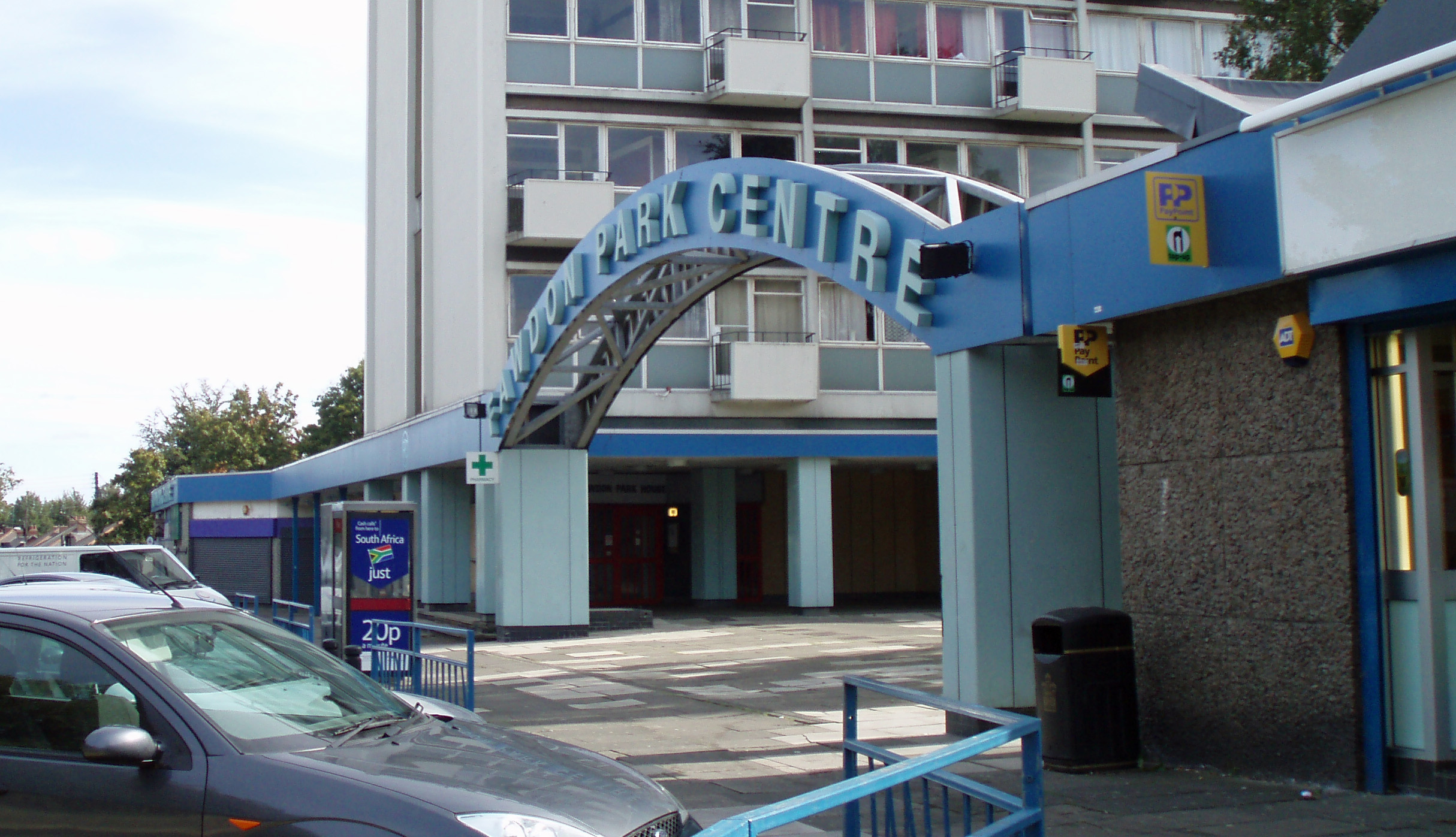
- Fawdon Park Centre

- Location within Tyne and Wear
- Population: 10,090 (2011 Census)
- OS grid reference: NZ228688
- Metropolitan borough: Newcastle upon Tyne
- Metropolitan county: Tyne and Wear
- Region: North East
- Country: England
- Sovereign state: United Kingdom
- Post town: NEWCASTLE UPON TYNE
- Postcode district: NE3
- Dialling code: 0191
- Police: Northumbria
- Fire: Tyne and Wear
- Ambulance: North East
- UK Parliament: Newcastle upon Tyne North
- Councillors: Nick Cott (Liberal Democrats); Brenda Hindmarsh (Liberal Democrats); Peter Lovatt (Liberal Democrats)

Fawdon is an area and electoral ward of Newcastle upon Tyne, in the county of Tyne and Wear, England. It is also close to the A1 western bypass. The population of the ward is 10,890, reducing to 10,090 at the 2011 Census, 5.7% of the total population of Newcastle upon Tyne. Car ownership in the area is 53.6%, lower than the city average of 54.7%. It falls within the historic county boundaries of Northumberland.

It is situated about 3.5 miles (5.6 km) north-by-west from Newcastle City Centre and is at the site of three colliery villages which were known as High Fawdon, Fawdon Square and Low Fawdon. Fawdon Square was the birthplace of 19th-century poet and songwriter Marshall Cresswell.

== Etymology ==
The name Fawdon is of Old English origin and derived from the elements fāg ("vegetated, multi-coloured") and dūn ("a hill").

== Transport and shopping ==
The Fawdon Wagonway (1818–1826) was an early cable car built by Benjamin Thompson.

Fawdon is now served by Fawdon Metro station. Fawdon Metro station stands on the site of the former Coxlodge station that was part of the Ponteland Railway. This is situated just behind the Fawdon Park Centre, a shopping centre that was built in 1967; it houses Fawdon Post Office and various shops.

In March 2008 the City Council decided to demolish Fawdon Park House whilst retaining the shops on the ground level. Fawdon Park House was originally built in the 1960s as part of the Fawdon Park Centre development. Tenants left in September 2009 and demolition of the building finally commenced in late 2012 following asbestos removal.

== Business ==
Fawdon is the site of the Fawdon Factory, a Nestlé Rowntree's factory on Rowan Drive, which opened in 1958, employs 600 workers and produces 40,000 tonnes of chocolate a year. It is Nestlé's second largest UK factory after York. The site makes Blue Riband, Breakaway (since 1970), Caramac (since 1959), Fruit pastilles, Rolo, and Yorkie biscuits. The Munchies brand moved there in 2006, from York. The site used to extensively use the rail sidings and track now used by the Metro. In 2021 Nestlé announced plans to close the Fawdon Factory by 2023. The Caramac bar was discontinued entirely by Nestlé in 2023 rather than moving production to another site. The building, but not any of Nestlé's business, is due to be transferred to Country Style Foods in 2024.

The pharmaceutical company Accord Healthcare has a 22-acre manufacturing site in Fawdon. The Accord site was previously used by the fellow pharmaceutical company Sanofi-Aventis before leaving the site in 2015.

== Education and recreation ==
The Fawdon ward has two schools, Regent Farm First School and North Fawdon Primary School these are both for children under the ages of 11.

Fawdon also has a combined library and community centre located on Fawdon Park Road. The local football team is based there, Fawdon FC. Fawdon FC play in the NABC leagues in different age groups.

Fawdon Library has computers with free internet access as well as books and newspapers. It has been run by volunteers since 2015. North Kenton Park, the home of Kenton sports centre, is in this ward and covers 42,500 square metres. Fawdon Park is also in the ward.

== Ward boundaries ==
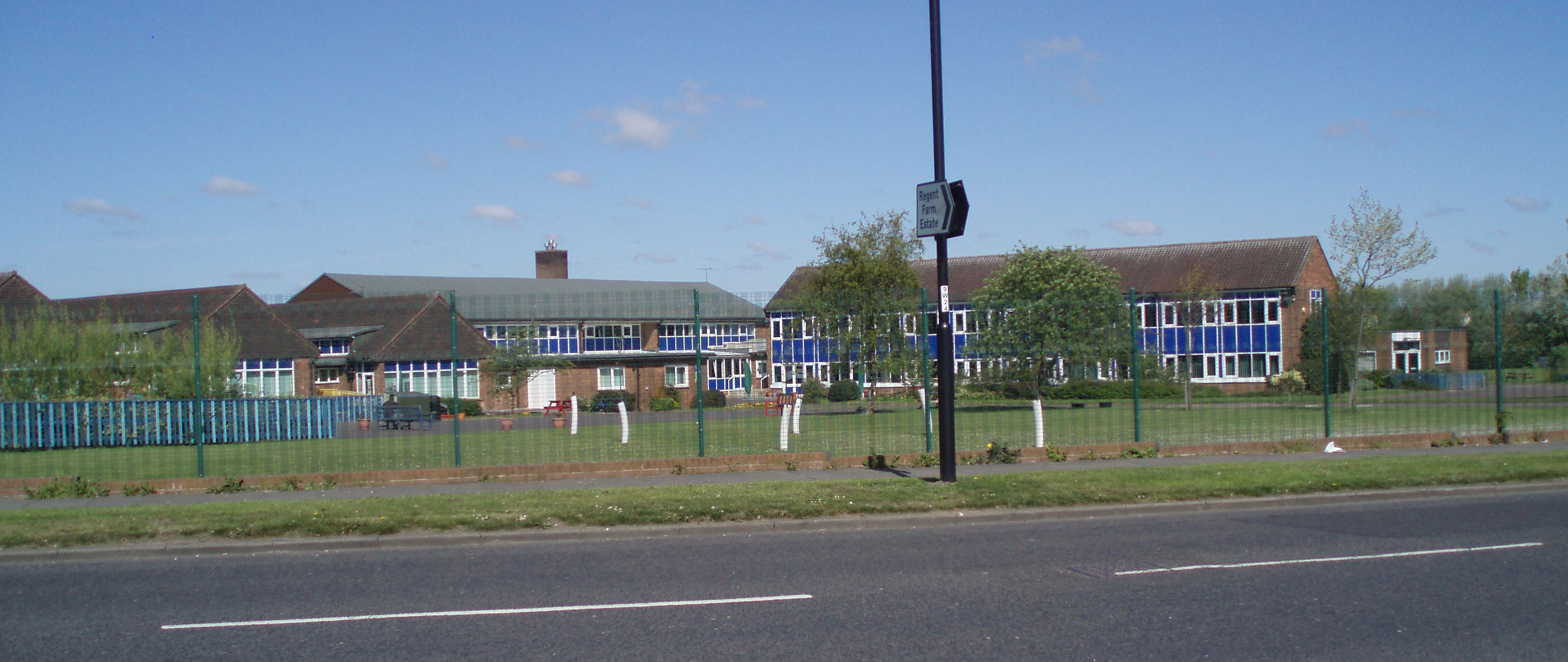
Regent Farm First School runs along the edge of the ward boundary.

The boundary of Fawdon ward begins at the footbridge over the Ouseburn and it continues along the Ouseburn to the A1. The boundary heads southwest to Hazeldene Avenue where it turns and carries on east into Quentin Avenue. At the bowling green the boundary heads south to Kirkwood Drive and turns south at the east of Mountfield Primary School. It turns eastward between Kirkwood Drive and Mountfield Gardens and runs along the southern edge of the allotment gardens. At Kenton Road the boundary runs north and then east onto Souter Road. It then continues to the south of Lambert Square and on to the back of Wall Close onto Wall Street. From Wall Street it heads northwest along Jubilee Road to the Wansbeck Road roundabout. It runs north of Wansbeck Road South past Regent Farm First School and Wansbeck Park Metro onto Wansbeck Road North to the Kingston Park Road roundabout. Then the boundary runs north along the properties to Kingston Park Road.

== Demographics ==
Age group	Number
Under 16	2,239
16–24	1,590
25–44	2,916
45–64	2,212
65–74	1,051
75+	500

Ethnicity	Number	%
White	10,110	96.8
Afro-Caribbean	25	0.2
South Asian	175	1.7
Chinese	33	0.3
Other	107	1

The ward has 4,908 housing spaces of which 4.8% are vacant, which is lower than the city average of 5.3%. Owner occupied property stands at 49.2%, slightly lower than the city average of 53.3%. The properties are as follows.

Property type	Number	%
Detached	358	7.3
Semi-detached	2,040	41.5
Terraced	1,055	21.5
Flats	1,460	29.7
Other	0	0

== History ==
Fawdon was formerly a township in the parish of Gosforth, in 1866 Elswick became a separate civil parish, on 1 April 1935 the parish was abolished and merged with Newcastle upon Tyne and Gosforth. In 1931 the parish had a population of 1003. It is now in the unparished area of Newcastle upon Tyne.
