= Seaton Burn =

Village in Tyne and Wear, England

Coordinates: 55.061°N 1.626°W

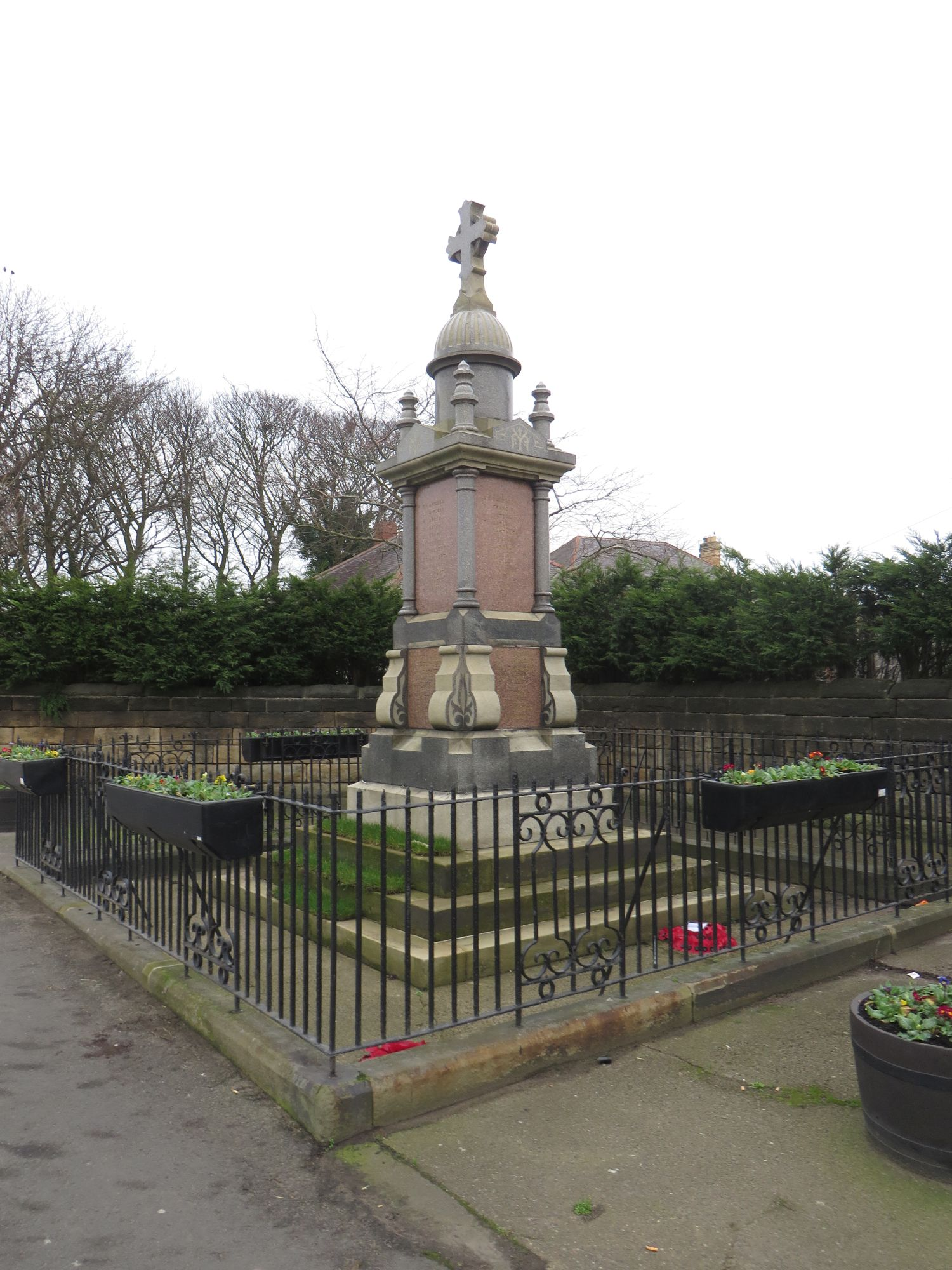
- Seaton Burn War Memorial

- Location within Tyne and Wear
- OS grid reference: NZ239741
- Metropolitan borough: North Tyneside
- Metropolitan county: Tyne and Wear
- Region: North East
- Country: England
- Sovereign state: United Kingdom
- Post town: NEWCASTLE UPON TYNE
- Postcode district: NE13
- Dialling code: 0191
- Police: Northumbria
- Fire: Tyne and Wear
- Ambulance: North East
- UK Parliament: North Tyneside

Seaton Burn is a village in North Tyneside, Tyne and Wear, to the north of Newcastle upon Tyne, and adjacent to Wideopen which is just south of it. It is part of the wider Seaton valley in which some Seaton villages are in Northumberland, and others in North Tyneside, Tyne and Wear. This is because the area lies on the border between the two counties.

The A1 used to pass through the village but now bypasses the village just to the west, where it meets the A19 which is the link road to the Tyne Tunnel.

== Economy ==
Seaton Burn Colliery opened in 1844. By October 1852 the colliery was owned by John Bowes & Co. Employment rose to 1,311 in 1921, and steadily fell after that until it was closed by the National Coal Board on 17 August 1965. NCB Brenkley Colliery was based on the old Seaton Burn Colliery site and continued producing coal until 1986. Some of the old Seaton Burn/Brenkley Colliery buildings have been adapted into the modern buildings built on the old site. Remaining walls of the "Fitting Shop" and "Blacksmiths Shop" can be observed. These have been combined into the modern buildings that are now there. Little now remains of the mine except for the old Seaton Burn Wagonway leading southeast from the village. This linked with the line from the mine at Weetslade and then went east to link with both the East Coast Main Line and the line leading south to Percy Main. The old track bed has now been established as a cycleway and leads to a quite extensive cycle network in North Tyneside.

== Landmarks ==
The Seaton is a stream that flows through southeastern Northumberland and reaches the North Sea at Seaton Sluice, after running through Holywell Dene.

== Notable people ==
- Jack Carr (1876–1948), professional footballer with Newcastle United, born in Seaton Burn
- Robson Green, English actor, educated at North Gosforth Academy, previously called Seaton Burn College
- Nicholas Ridley, politician: born here
