= Burradon Tower =

- Northumberland, England
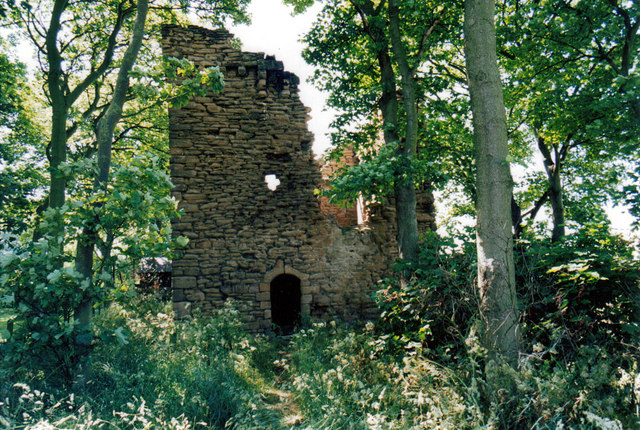
- Burradon Tower

Location
- Location in Northumberland
- Coordinates: 55.051047°N 1.568988°W
- Grid reference: NZ27637303

Burradon Tower is a ruinous tower house at Burradon, North Tyneside, England which is both a Scheduled Ancient Monument and a Grade II listed building.

The Manor of Burradon was acquired by John Orde in 1441 when due to the devastation wrought by the Scots and the poor quality of the soil it was valued at only 20 shillings a year. The tower, originally a three-storeyed single square bay, was probably built about 1553 by Orde's nephew, Bertram Anderson.

The property passed in 1569 to the Ogle family by whom it was extended and improved. A fireplace bears the date 1633 and the initials LO, thought to represent Lancelot Ogle who is thought to have initiated the work.

Following the marriage of Jane Ogle to her cousin James Ogle of Causey Park House the tower was abandoned and by 1769 it was reported to be derelict. In the 19th century the structure was incorporated into a farm building at Burradon Farm.
