= David Hagan (cricketer) =

English cricketer

Personal information
- Full name: David Andrew Hagan
- Born: 25 June 1966 (age 60); Wideopen, Northumberland, England
- Batting: Right-handed
- Bowling: Right-arm off break

Domestic team information
- Years: Team
- 1985–1991: Oxford University

Career statistics
Competition	First-class	List A
Matches	41	2
Runs scored	1,242	21
Batting average	20.36	10.50
100s/50s	–/4	–/–
Top score	88	11
Balls bowled	25	0
Wickets	0	–
Bowling average	–	–
5 wickets in innings	–	–
10 wickets in match	–	–
Best bowling	–	–
Catches/stumpings	18/–	–/–
- Source: Cricinfo, 30 August 2019

David Andrew Hagan (born 25 June 1966) is an English former cricketer.

Hagan was born in June 1966 at Wideopen, Northumberland. He later studied at St Edmund Hall, Oxford. While studying at Oxford, he made his debut in first-class cricket for Oxford University against Worcestershire at Oxford in 1985. He played first-class cricket for Oxford until 1991, making forty appearances. Playing as a batsman, Hagan scored 1,212 runs at an average of 20.54 and a high score of 88, which was one of four half centuries he made. He also made a first-class appearance for a combined Oxford and Cambridge Universities cricket team against the touring New Zealanders in 1986. In addition to playing first-class cricket while at Oxford, he also made two List A one-day appearances for the Combined Universities cricket team in the 1986 Benson & Hedges Cup.
