= Seaton Burn Wagonway =

Cable railway near Newcastle upon Tyne, England

Coordinates: 55.06056°N 1.63253°W

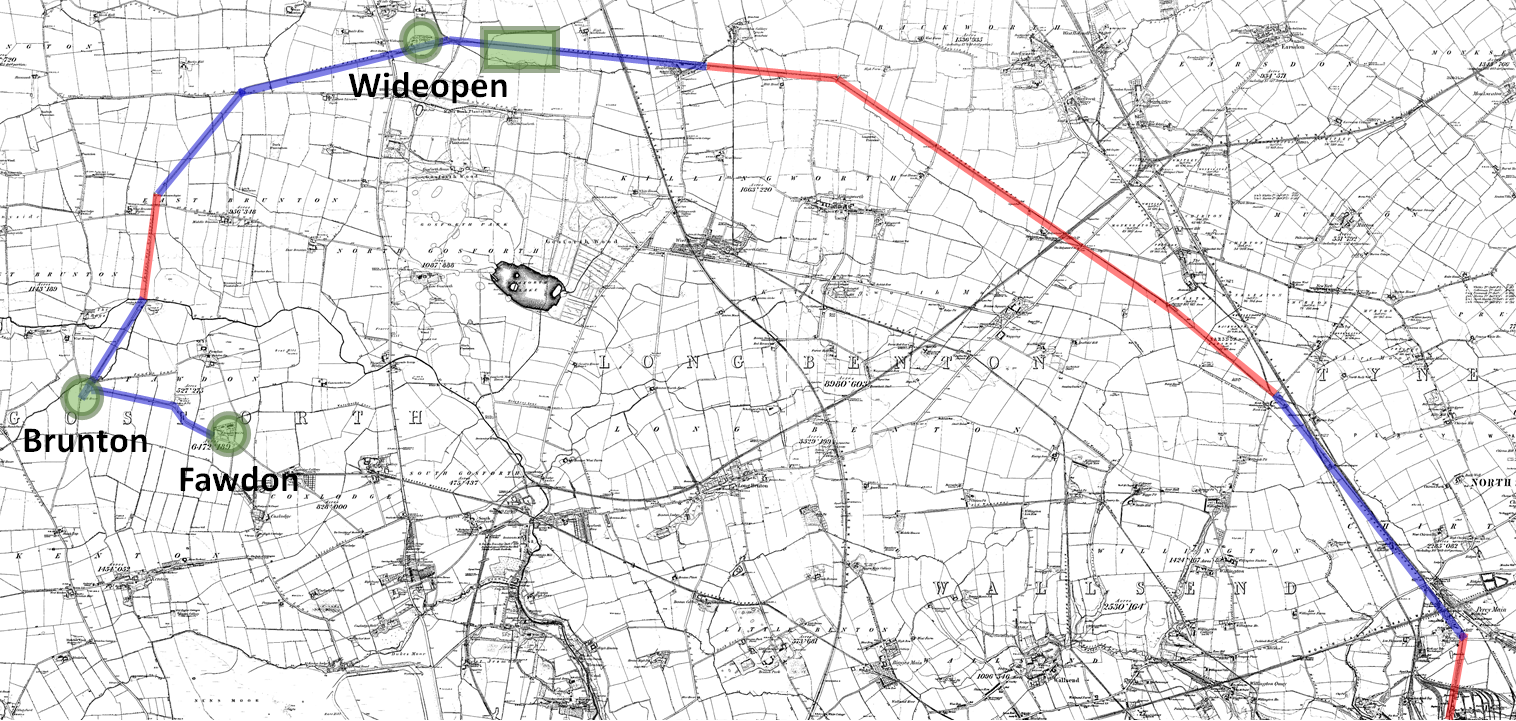
- Route of horse-drawn (blue) and rope-operated (red) wagonway sections, locations of collieries (circles) and archeological survey (green box)

Overview
- Other name(s): Brunton and Shields Railway

Service
- Type: Coal wagonway

History
- Opened: 1826
- Closed: 1920

Technical
- Track gauge: 4 ft 8 1/2 in (1,435 mm) standard gauge
- Old gauge: 4 ft 6 in (1,372 mm) Scotch gauge

The Seaton Burn Wagonway (originally known as the Brunton and Shields Railway) was from 1826 to 1920 a partially horse-drawn and partially rope-operated industrial railway with a gauge of 4 ft 6 in (1,372 mm) near Newcastle upon Tyne.

== History ==
The Brunton and Shields Railway was constructed by Benjamin Thompson on behalf of the Grand Allies and inaugurated in 1826. It followed a route from east to west via Burradon and Camperdown. Initially it did not serve the Burradon colliery, which operated a separate wagonway. It was constructed in phases starting in 1826 from the colliery in Brunton and being extended in 1837 to the bank of the River Tyne near Wallsend and North Shields. The incline planes were either self-acting like a funicular, where loaded wagons pulled the empty wagons uphill, or rope-operated like a cable railway using stationary steam engines.

Around 1867 the rail track from Seaton Burn to the coal staiths at the Tyne was re-gauged to standard gauge 4 ft 8 1/2 in (1,435 mm) so that it could be used by standard gauge colliery wagons. The Killingworth and Dinnington Colleries were connected to the line at the same time. From 1878 its name changed to Seaton Burn Wagonway. Finally, the rail track towards Backworth was built, to provide access to the Blyth and Tyne Railway, which was owned by the North Eastern Railway in the 1920s.

== Operation ==
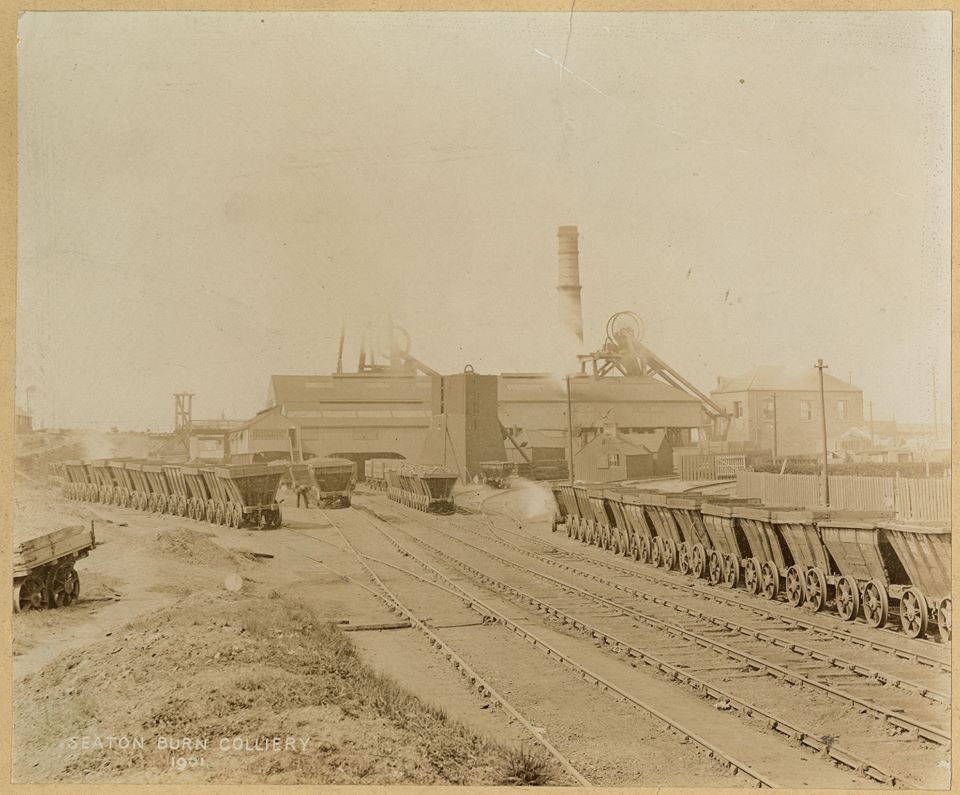
Seaton Burn Colliery in 1901

The Brunton and Shields Railway had five continuous incline planes worked by stationary engines. The method of drawing goods on railways by means of stationary engines and ropes, called the reciprocating plan of conveyance, was invented and patented by Benjamin Thompson. Only one of the five incline planes was operated by the reciprocating plan of conveyance.

Steam engines were placed at intervals of 1 1/2 miles (2.4 km) along the whole line of the railway. Ropes ran on rollers, placed between the rails, from one engine to the other, to draw the waggons forward. When a train of waggons left a station, it took along with it another rope, called the tail rope, which served to bring back the next train which was moving in the contrary direction. The rope which drew the first train then became the tail rope, and was drawn back by the former, which then became the head rope.

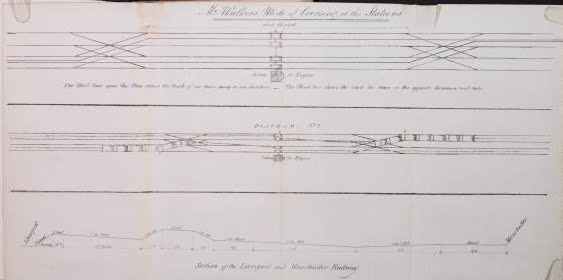
Mode of Crossing at the Stations of the Brunton and Shields Railway: The diagram shows two trains of waggons being drawn towards the station. The train 'd' having to take the switches at 'e' to cross into the other road, necessarily comes in contact with the rope from the roll, 'No. 2', which is out at the next station. The same obstruction arises to the train 'c' by the rope which is out at the station in the opposite direction.

The Brunton and Shields Railway had only a single line of rails with a passing place at the engine stations. A speed of 10 to 12 miles per hour (16 to 19 km/h) or more could be maintained during the time the carriages were in motion. However, the stoppages in changing ropes and crossing from one way to the other at the engine stations reduced the average speed, as shown in the following table, taken during experiments with a gross load of 31 tons on a windy day:

Plane	Length (yards)	Length (miles)	Length (km)	Time in motion	Stoppages
First Plane	1287 yards	0.731 miles	1.177 km	5' 10"	8' 20"
Second Plane	2316 yards	1.316 miles	2.118 km	7' 30"	4' 30"
Third Plane	1562 yards	0.888 miles	1.428 km	6' 30"	6' 00"
Fourth Plane	1760 yards	1.00 mile	1.61 km	6' 00"	5' 00"
Fifth Plane	2068 yards	1.175 miles	1.891 km	5' 10"	0' 00"
Total	8993 yards	5.110 miles	8.223 km	30' 20"	23' 50"

On three of the incline planes the loaded waggons ran themselves, and the rope was merely used to draw back the empty ones, and on the other the full waggons were drawn up, and the empty ones ran back with the rope. On four of the planes only one rope was used, because the gravity of the waggons dispensed with the other. This mode was highly advantageous, in point of simplicity and economy, when compared with the reciprocating system, where two ropes to each train were required.

== Remains ==
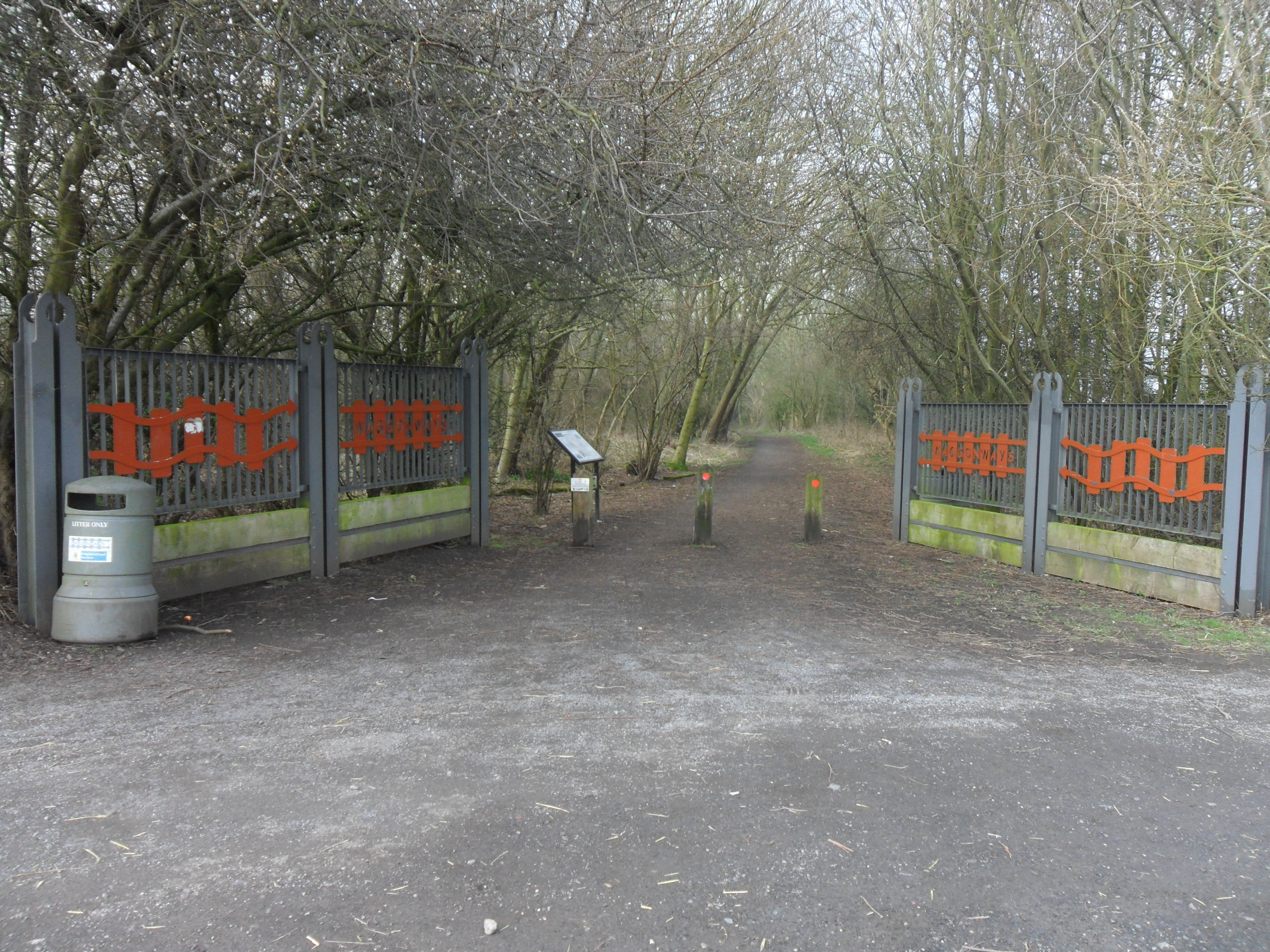
Seaton Burn Waggonway

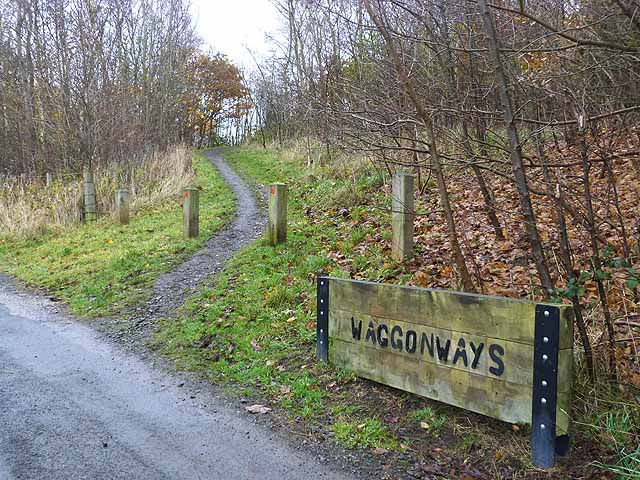
The northern end of Seaton Burn Wagonway

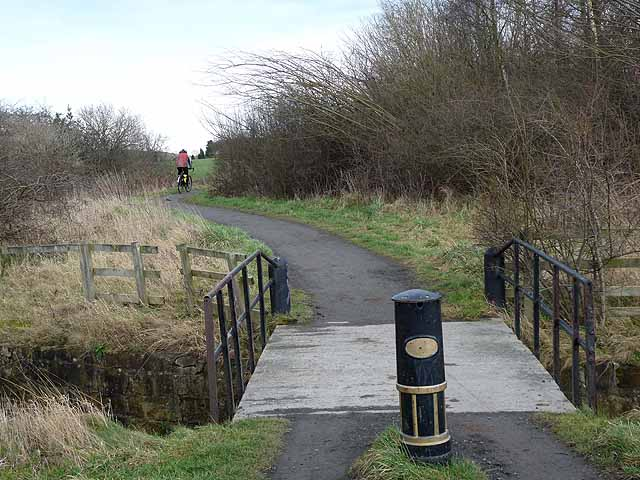
Bridge of the wagonway near its northern end crossing the Seaton Burn

== Further literature ==
- Wood, Nicholas (1838). A Practical Treatise on Rail-roads, and Interior Communication in General (Third ed.). London: Longman, Orme, Brown, Green, & Longmans. pp. 488 – via Internet Archive.
