= North Gosforth =

Suburb of Newcastle upon Tyne, England

Coordinates: 55.023°N 1.622°W

- Location within Tyne and Wear
- Population: 5,639 (2011)
- OS grid reference: NZ242699
- Civil parish: North Gosforth
- Metropolitan borough: Newcastle upon Tyne
- Metropolitan county: Tyne and Wear
- Region: North East
- Country: England
- Sovereign state: United Kingdom
- Police: Northumbria
- Fire: Tyne and Wear
- Ambulance: North East

North Gosforth is a suburb and civil parish in the City of Newcastle upon Tyne in Tyne and Wear, England. It is north of the city centre, and has a population of 3,527, increasing to 5,639 at the 2011 Census.
