= Bothal =

Hamlet in Northumberland, England

Coordinates: 55.173°N 1.625°W

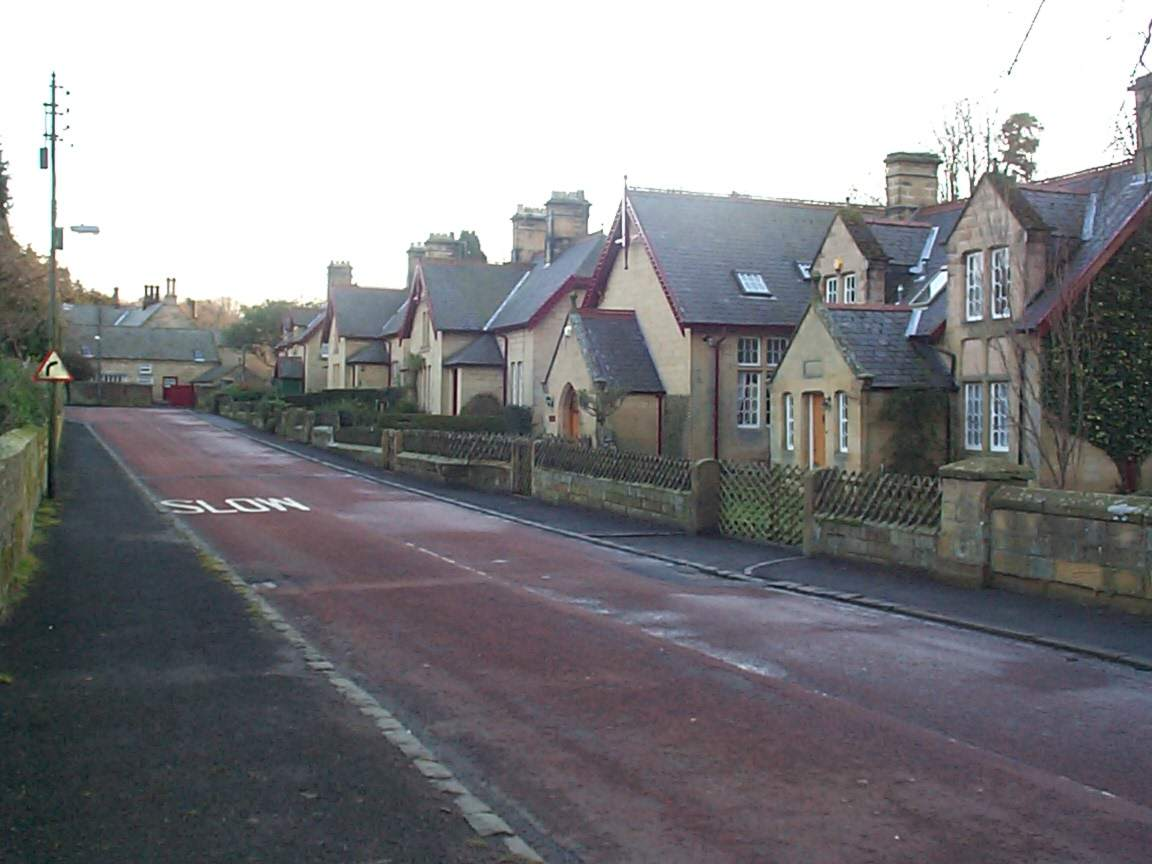
- Bothal village

- Location within Northumberland
- OS grid reference: NZ240866
- Civil parish: Ashington
- Unitary authority: Northumberland
- Ceremonial county: Northumberland
- Region: North East
- Country: England
- Sovereign state: United Kingdom
- Post town: MORPETH
- Postcode district: NE61
- Dialling code: 01670
- Police: Northumbria
- Fire: Northumberland
- Ambulance: North East
- UK Parliament: Wansbeck

Bothal is a hamlet in the civil parish of Ashington, Northumberland, England. It is situated between Morpeth and Ashington. There is a castle, a church, a vicarage opposite the church gates, stepping stones over the River Wansbeck, and a few houses.

Bothal was the headquarters of the extensive Welbeck Estates in Northumberland. Half a mile upstream of the castle are the remains of a watermill that still had a working waterwheel up to about the First World War. It had a turbine for electricity production for the mill house from 1947 to 1980. Until 1866 Bothal was a civil parish, In 1831 the parish had a population of 1319.

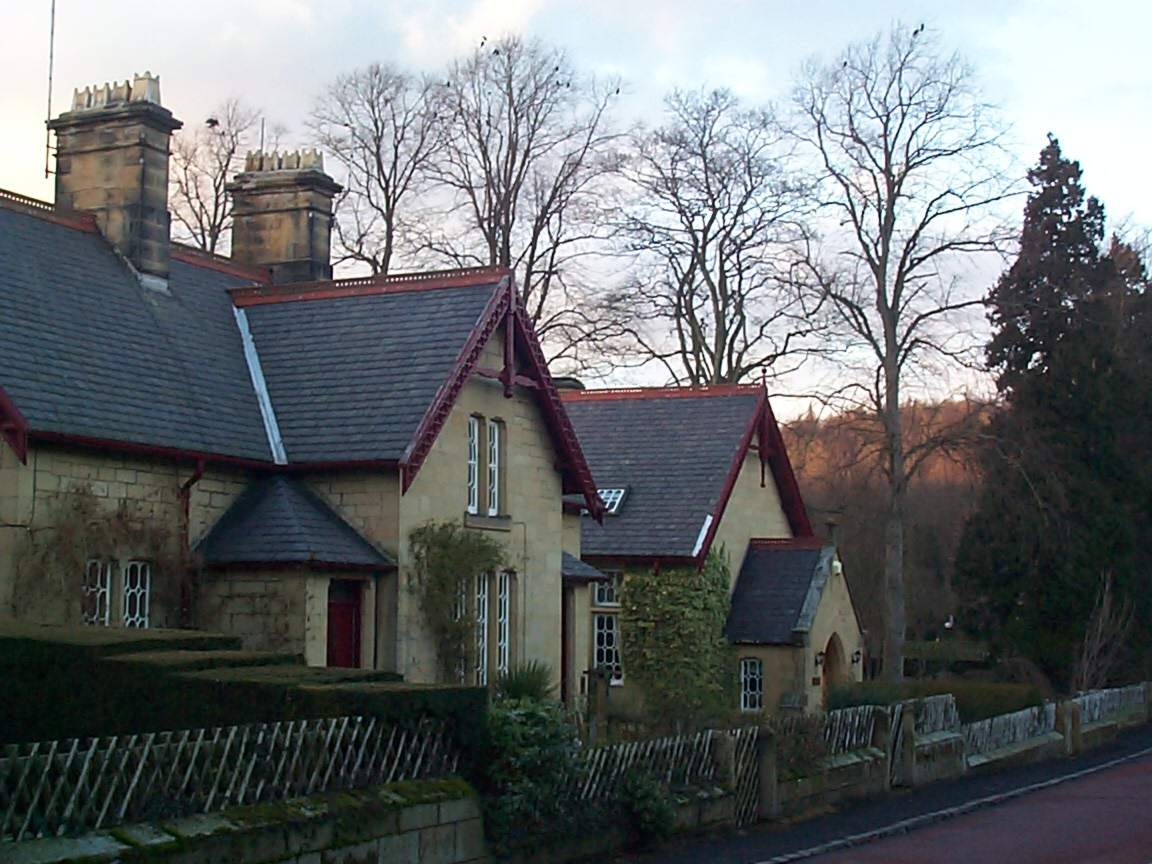
Bothal village

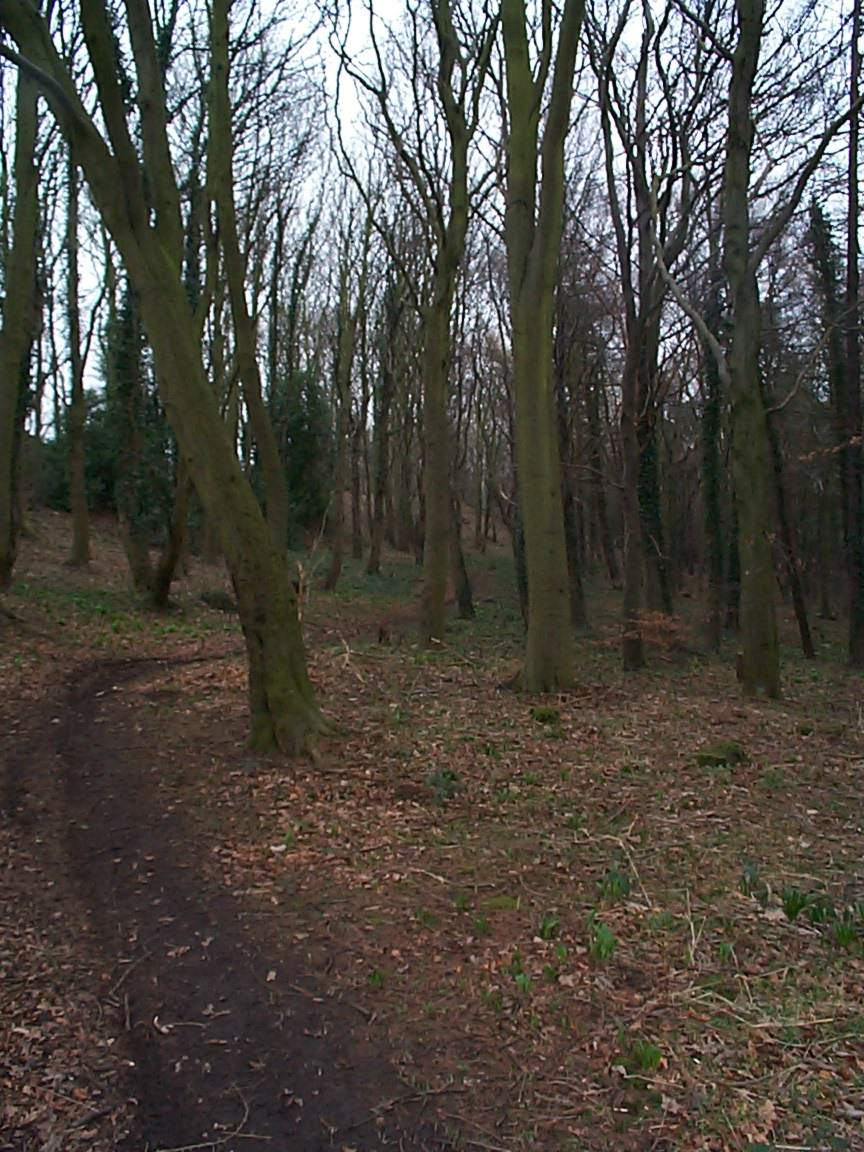
Into Bothal woods

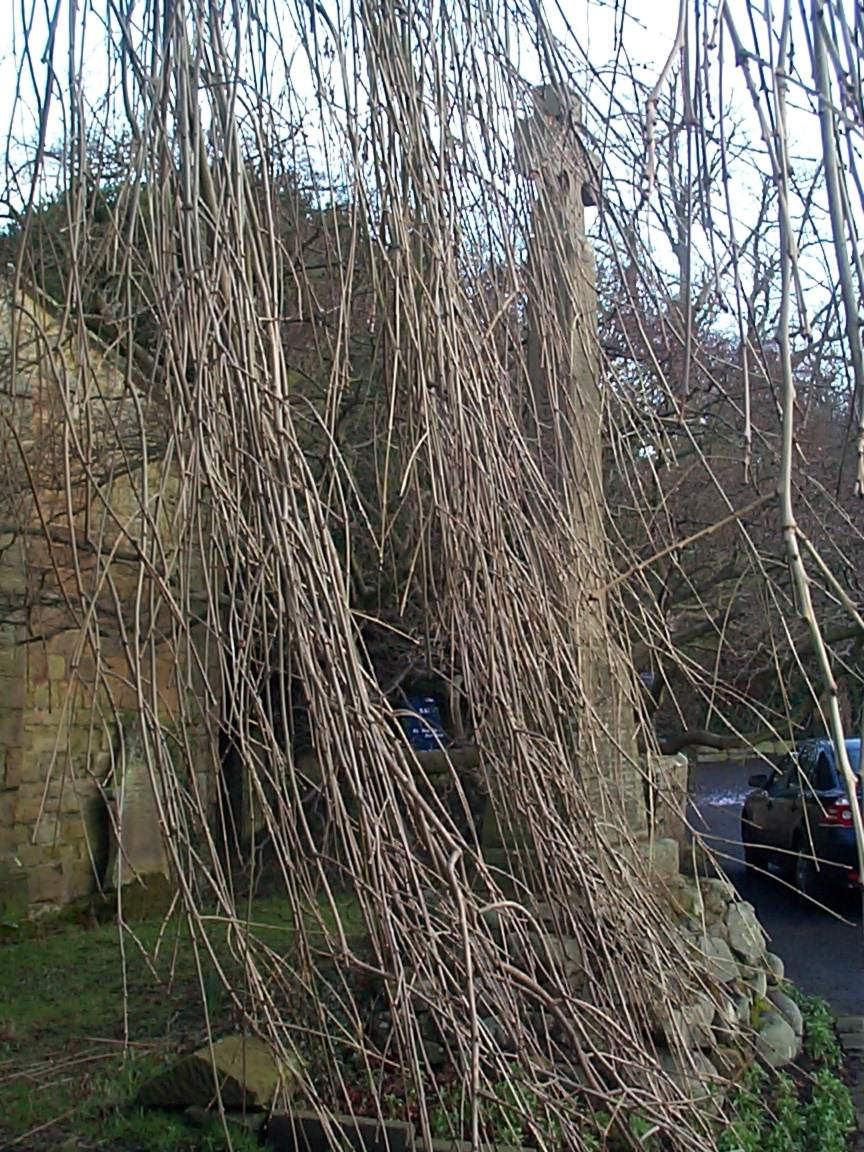
Bothal village

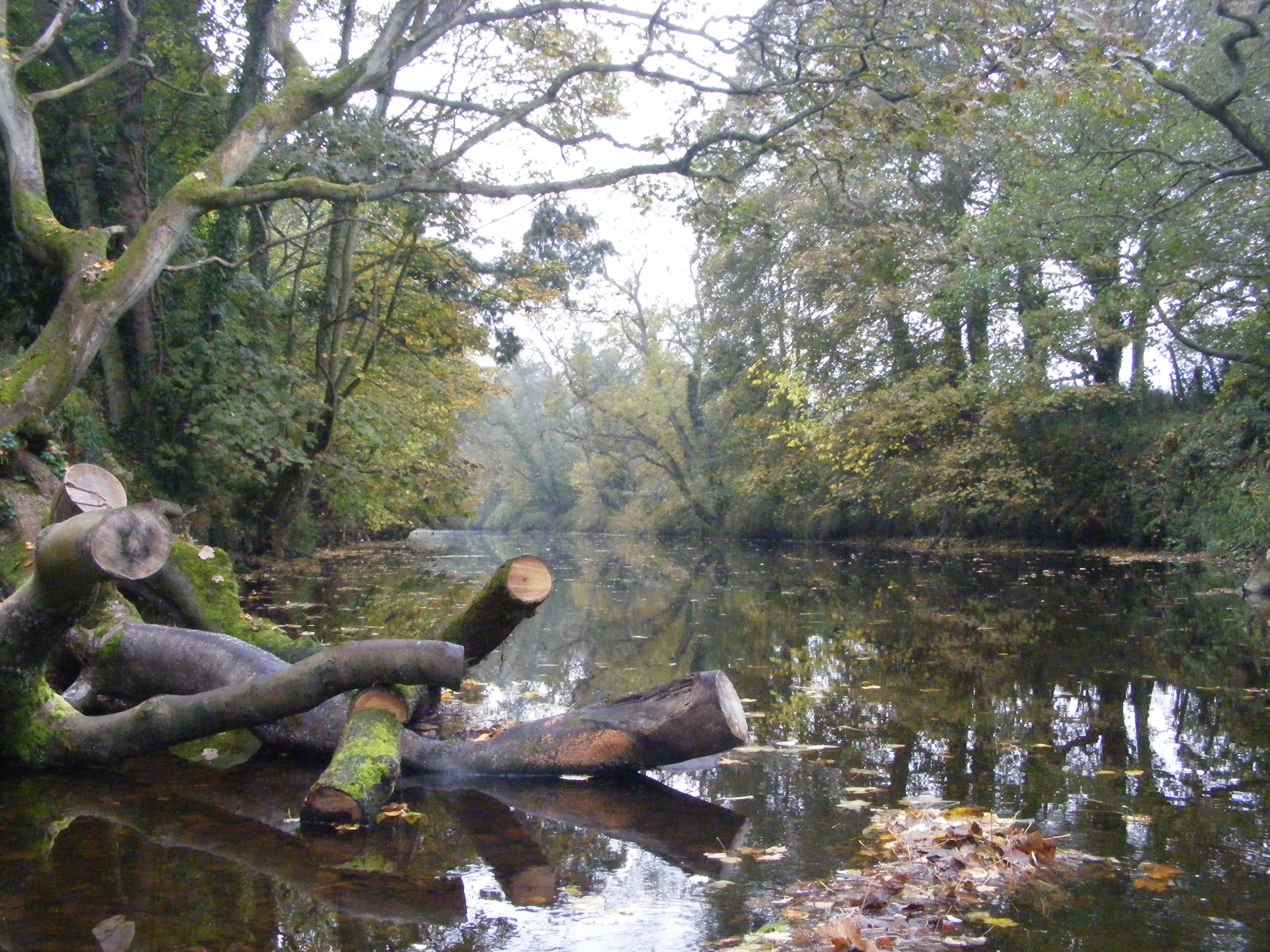
The River Wansbeck viewed from the stepping stones at Bothal.

Bothal was also a drift mine ('Bothal Barns Drift') though this is something of a misnomer. Bothal Drift was merely another entrance to the Ashington colliery. Now, Bothal Barns Drift is the site of a private house with the old entrance to the drift mine being long disused. The Bothal Drift is situated on the top of the bank on the Ashington side.

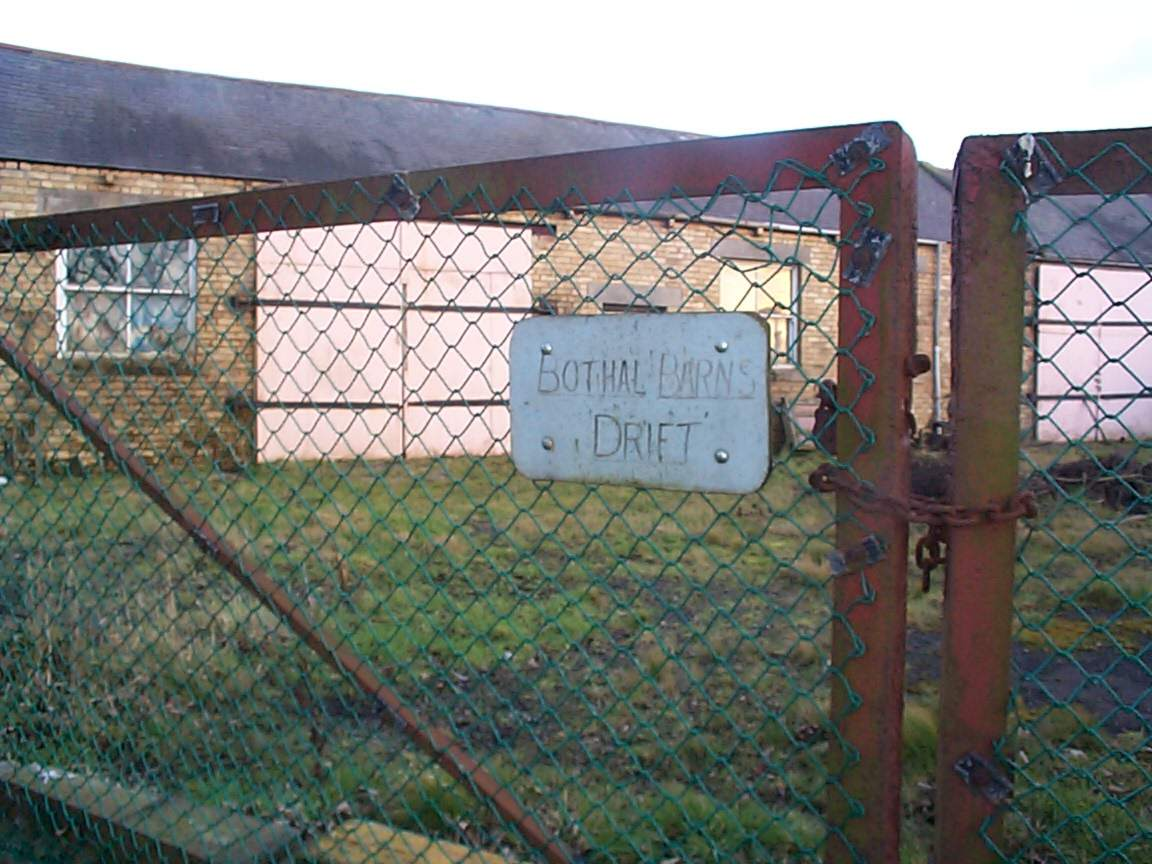
It used to be the entrance to the 'drift'mine

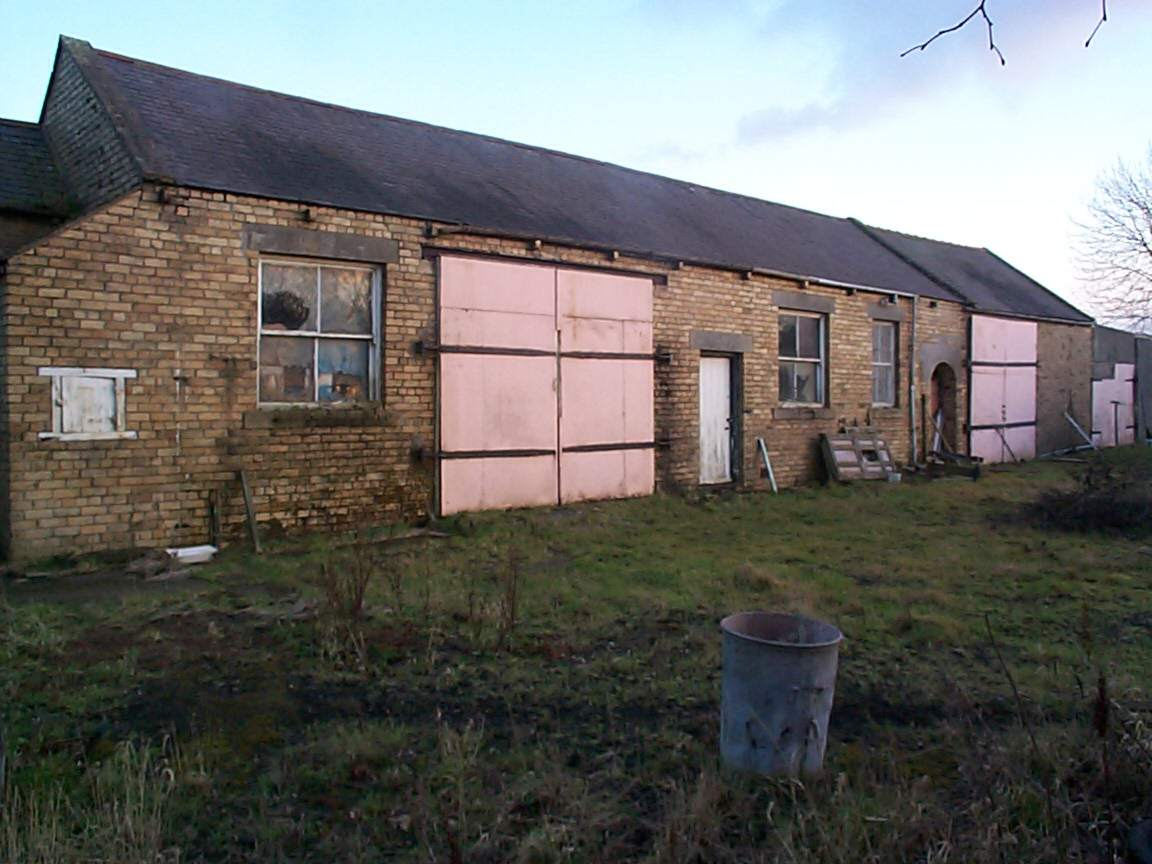
Now long disused.

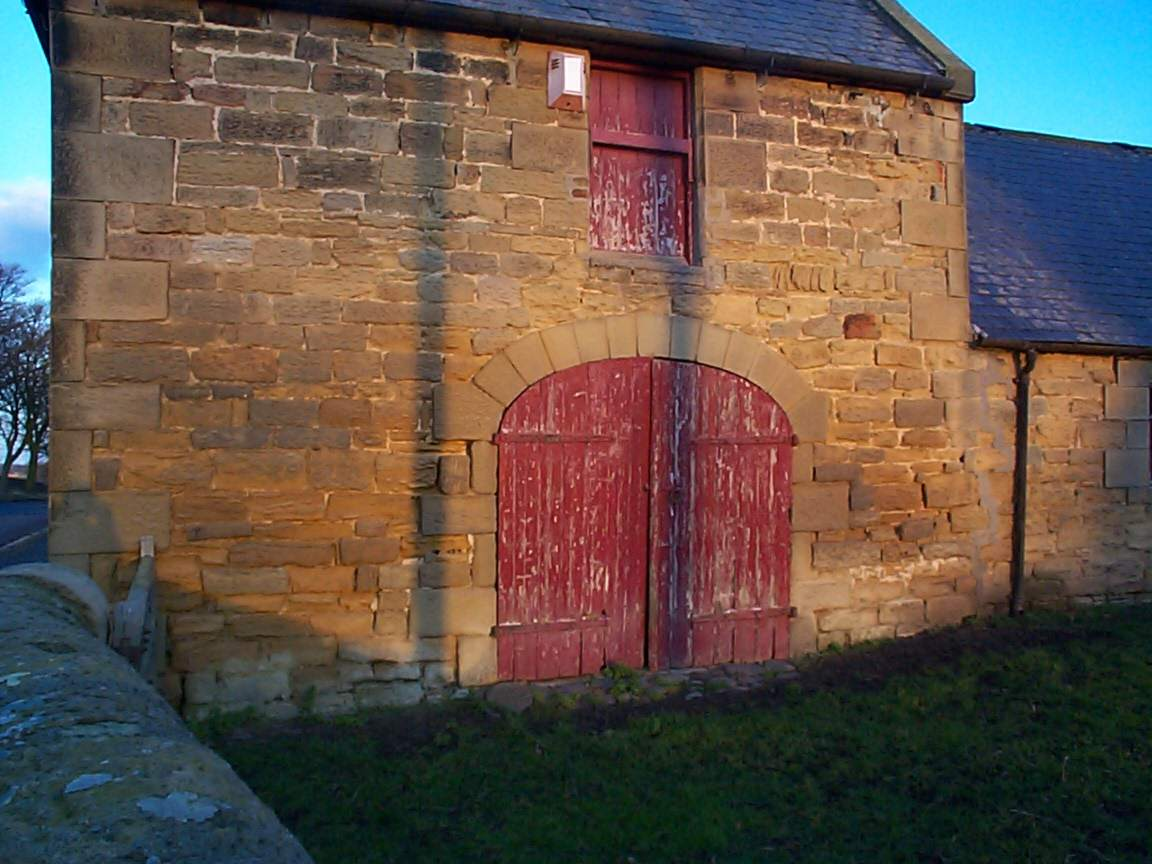
Nearby farmhouse 'Bothal Barns'

Further west (a few hundred yards) from the church and castle, it is possible to walk along the River Wansbeck for some 30–45 minutes west towards Morpeth. The name Morpeth apparently means 'murder path' and was once the main thoroughfare along the river. Further along the footpath is the remains of an old chapel.

The footpath starts near the site of the old mill. You can park your car near the gate (at the bridge) and then walk westwards past the weir. The path does not allow bikes or horses and is not wheelchair accessible,

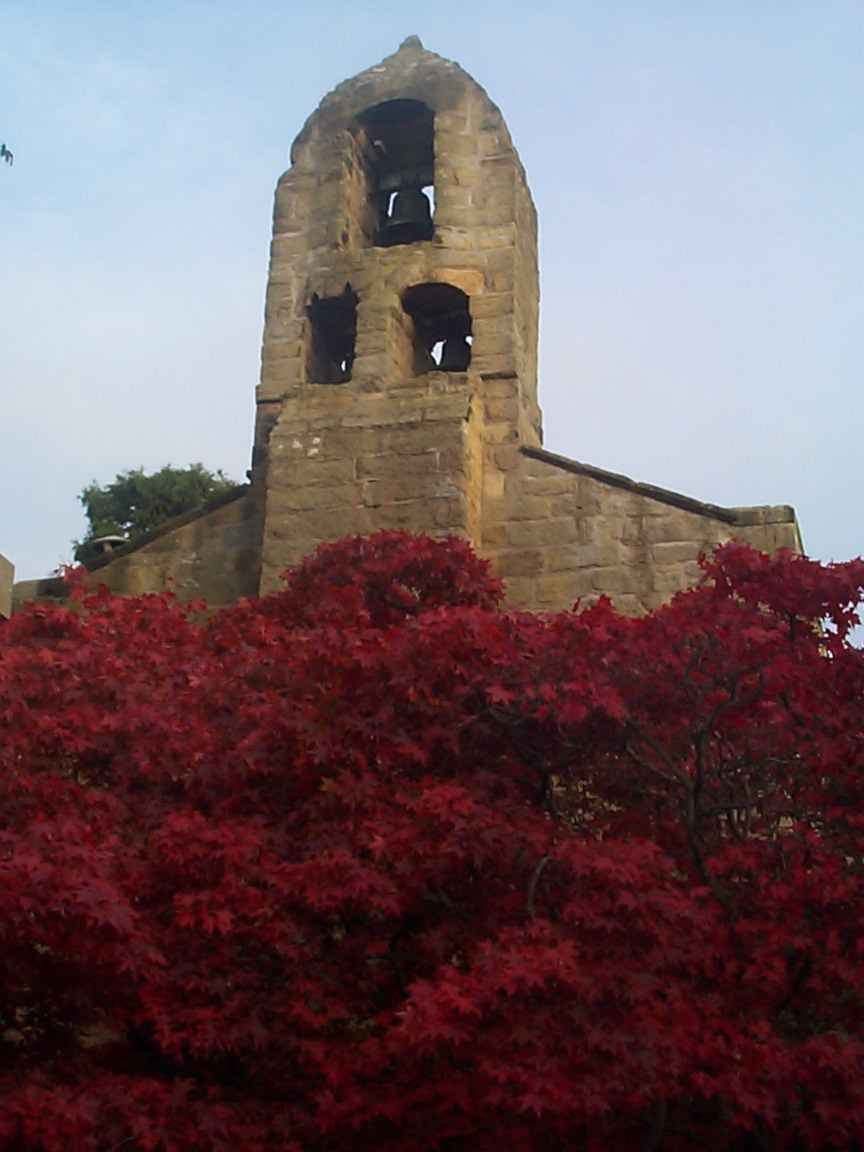
Bothal church in the summer

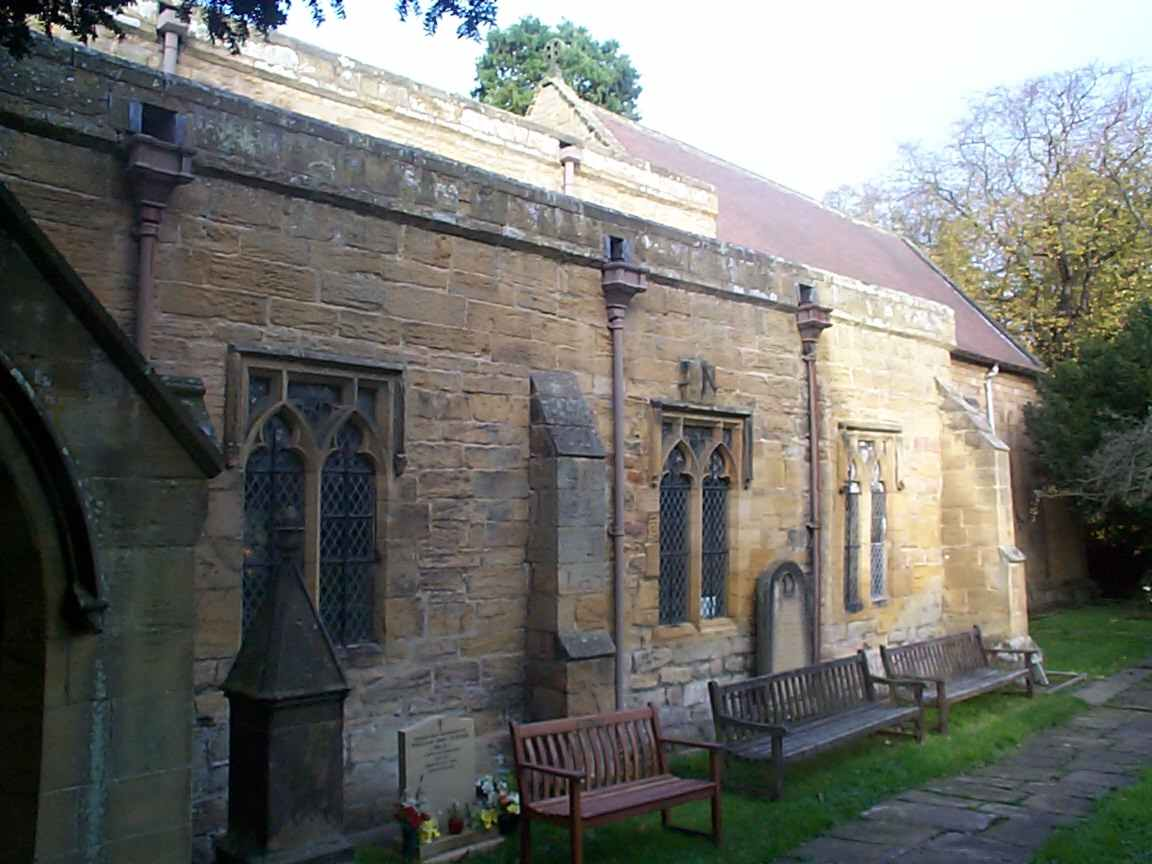
Bothal church

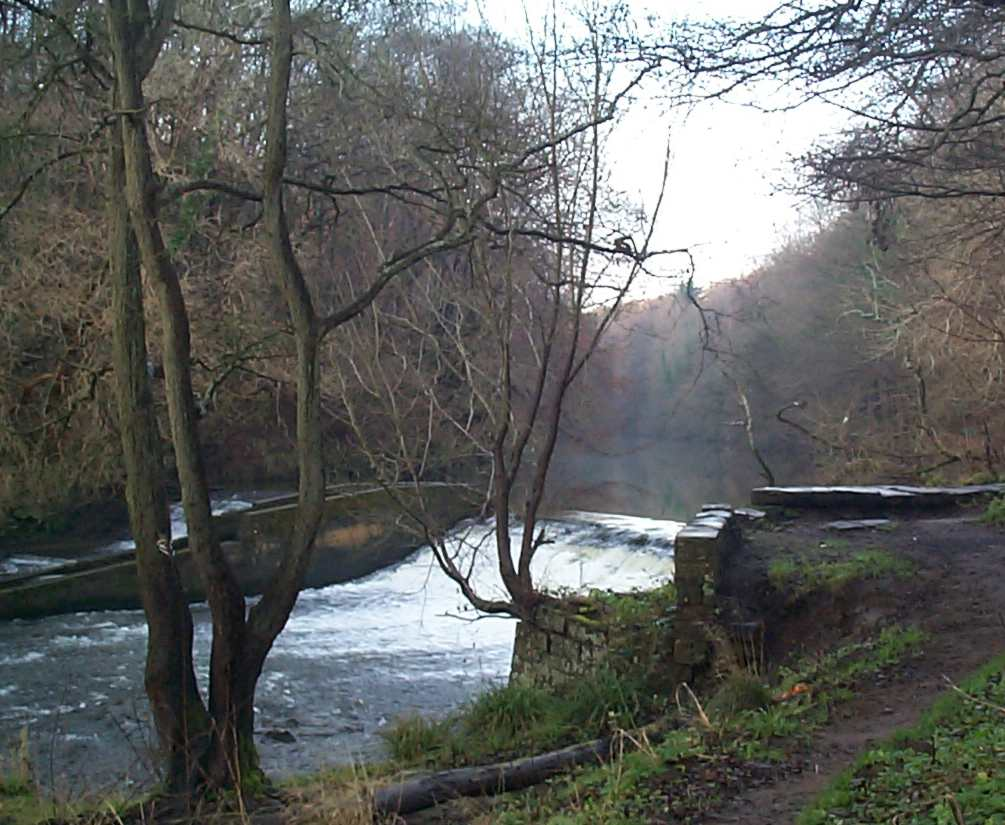
The old weir, just past the outbuilding/ old watermill. Looking west

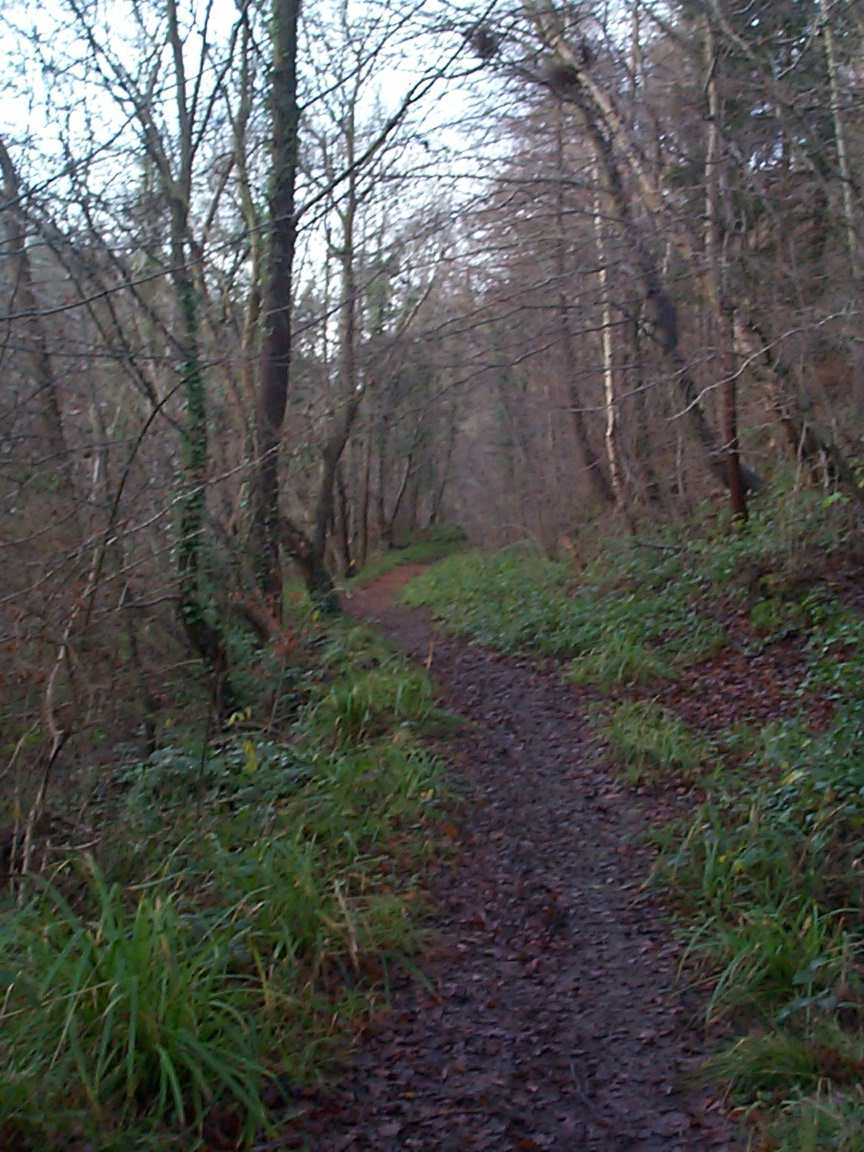
The footpath leading west along the river Wansbeck
