= North Gosforth Academy =

Location
- Dudley Lane; Seaton Burn; Tyne and Wear, NE13 6EJ; England
- Coordinates: 55.0583°N 1.6195°W

Information
- Type: Academy
- Local authority: North Tyneside
- Trust: Gosforth Federated Academies
- Department for Education URN: 144279 Tables
- Ofsted: Reports
- Headteacher: Pete Fox
- Gender: Co-educational
- Age: 11 to 18
- Website: https://www.northgosforthacademy.org.uk/

North Gosforth Academy is a co-educational secondary school located in Seaton Burn, Tyne and Wear, England. It has a specialism in business and enterprise. In 2018 it became a member of Gosforth Federated Academies.

North Gosforth Academy offers GCSEs, BTECs and Cambridge Nationals as programmes of study for pupils.

== History ==
Previous logo of Seaton Burn College

In 2017 it was announced that Seaton Burn College was to be sponsored by Gosforth Academy. Until 1 January 2018 the school was known as Seaton Burn College and was a foundation school administered by North Tyneside Metropolitan Borough Council.

== Notable staff ==
- John Graham, cricketer

== Notable former pupils ==
- Robson Green, actor
- Andy Sinton, former England International Football player
