= Thomas Abiel Prior =

British engraver (1809–1886)

Thomas Abiel Prior (5 November 1809 – 1886) was a British engraver.

== Life ==
Prior was born in 1809. He made a reputation in 1846, with the print Heidelberg Castle and Town, engraved from a drawing by J. M. W. Turner, and under Turner's supervision; it was published by subscription. A plate in mezzotint, More frightened than hurt, after James Bateman (1814–1849), was an isolated experiment. He exhibited twice, at the Royal Academy.

In later life Prior lived in Calais, to be near his son who had settled there, and taught drawing. He died there on 8 November 1886.

== Works ==
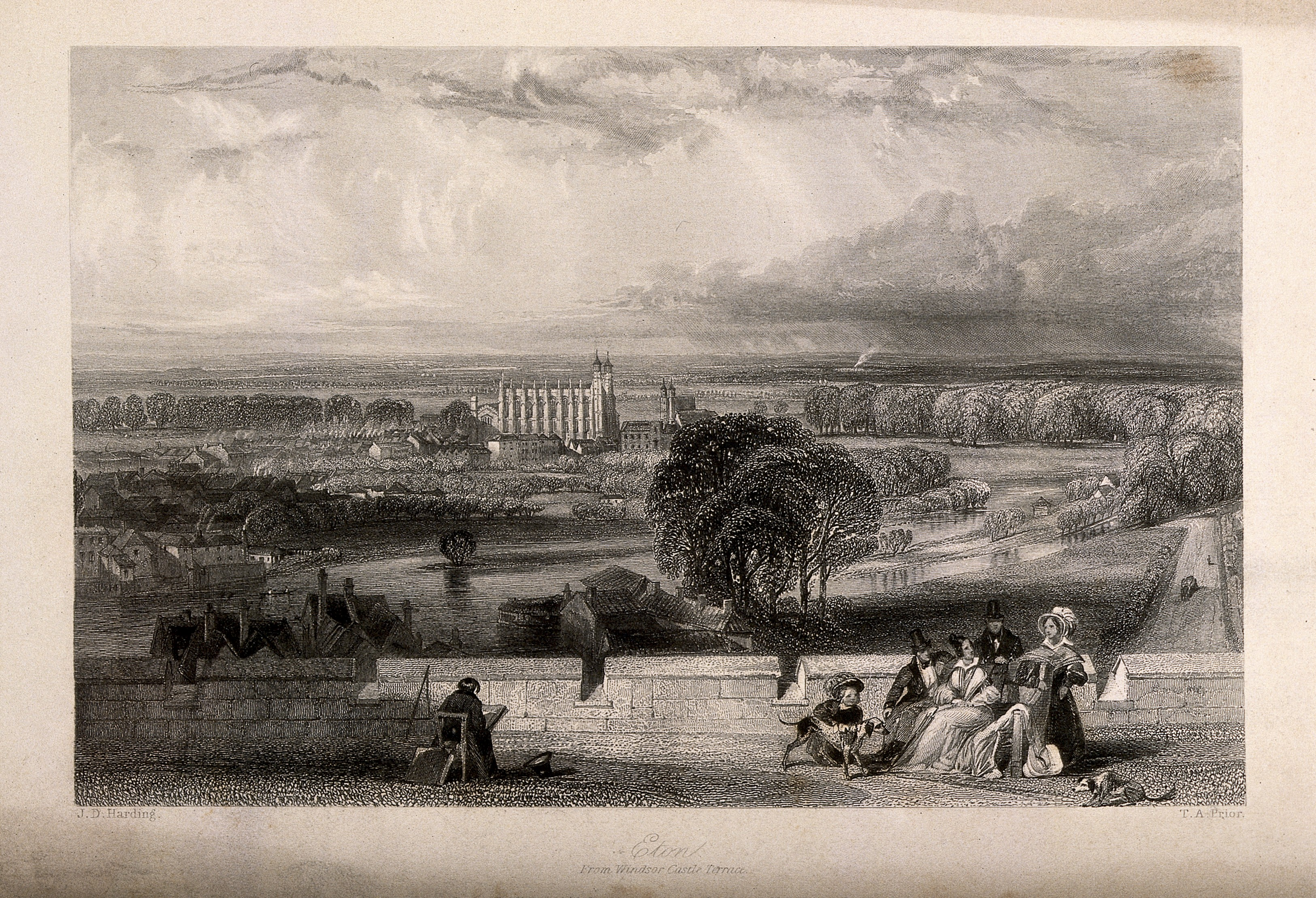
View of Eton College, 1840 engraving by Thomas Abiel Prior

In his early career, Prior made plates of landscapes for publishers. After Turner, he went on to engrave:

- Zurich, 1852; Dido building Carthage, 1863; Apollo and the Sibyl(Bay of Baiæ), 1873; The Sun rising in a Mist, begun by William Chapman, 1874; and The Fighting Téméraire, 1886, his last work;
- The Goddess of Discord choosing the Apple of Contention in the Garden of the Hesperides and Heidelberg Castle for the Turner Gallery; and
- The Golden Bough and Venice: the Dogana for the Vernon Gallery.

Other works for the Vernon Gallery were Ruins in Italy, after Richard Wilson; De Tabley Park and The Council of Horses, after James Ward, and Woodcutting in Windsor Forest, after John Linnell. Prior also engraved Crossing the Bridge, after Sir Edwin Landseer, and for The Art Journal, pictures in the royal collection:

- The Windmill, after Jacob Isaackszoon van Ruisdael; The Village Fête, after David Teniers; Dover, after George Chambers; The Opening of New London Bridge, after Clarkson Stanfield; and Constantinople: the Golden Horn, after Jacobus Jacobs.

== Family ==
Prior married Emma Sharrow in 1837. They had a son, Thomas William.
