= Camperdown, Tyne and Wear =

Coordinates: 55.042633°N 1.577433°W

Camperdown
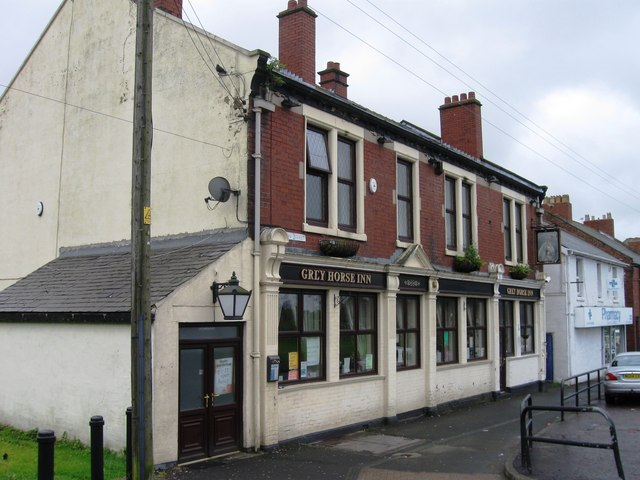
- The Grey Horse Inn

- Location within Tyne and Wear
- Metropolitan borough: North Tyneside
- Metropolitan county: Tyne and Wear
- Region: North East
- Country: England
- Sovereign state: United Kingdom

Camperdown is a village in the metropolitan borough of North Tyneside, Tyne and Wear, England. Camperdown is just south of Burradon, and the two villages are closely linked. Both villages had coal mines. Until 1974 it was in Northumberland.

== History ==
On 1 April 1899 Camperdown became a separate civil parish being formed from Longbenton, on 1 April 1912 the parish was abolished and merged with Longbenton. In 1911 the parish had a population of 918. It is now in the unparished area of Longbenton.

== See also ==
- The Battle of Camperdown, a naval battle in 1797
