= Thomas Harrison Hair =

British painter

Thomas Harrison Hair (23 December 1808 – 11 August 1875) was a British artist most famous for depictions of industrial scenes in north-eastern England in the first half of the nineteenth century.

== Life ==
T.H. Hair (as he signed his work) was born in Newcastle upon Tyne or the nearby village of Newburn on 23 December 1808, the son of John Hair, a lamp-black maker and tanner from Scotswood, Newcastle upon Tyne, and Hannah Harrison. He was baptised at All Saints' Church, Newcastle upon Tyne on 22 January 1809. Little is known of his early life but he probably trained in the workshops of Mark Lambert (1781–1855), a Tyneside engraver and lithographer. Lambert had been assistant to Thomas Bewick (1753–1828), the famous wood engraver from Cherryburn, Northumberland.

Hair relocated to London in the late 1830s, and produced a body of work there, much of it referring to North East England. Three of his paintings were exhibited at the Royal Academy of Arts between 1841 and 1849, including one of Tynedale Fell, Cumberland, and another of Bothwell Castle, near Glasgow, suggesting he travelled more widely across northern Britain than just the coal-mining communities of Durham and Northumberland with which he was later primarily associated.

In 1851 he was living and working at Taunton, Somerset. But he had returned to live and work in north-east England by the time of the 1861 census, which records him as an unmarried "Landscape Painter &c", boarding at a Gloucester Street house in Newcastle's Elswick district. He died on 11 August 1875 (not 1882 as stated by many biographies). He was buried in an unmarked grave in the churchyard of All Saints, Newcastle, where he had been baptised.

== Works ==
Most of Hair's work consists of general landscapes, especially scenes in the North East of England. His most notable work however is a set of etchings published in Views of the Collieries ... of Northumberland and Durham (1844) giving rare insights into the visual impact of early nineteenth-century coal-mining and other industrial activities.

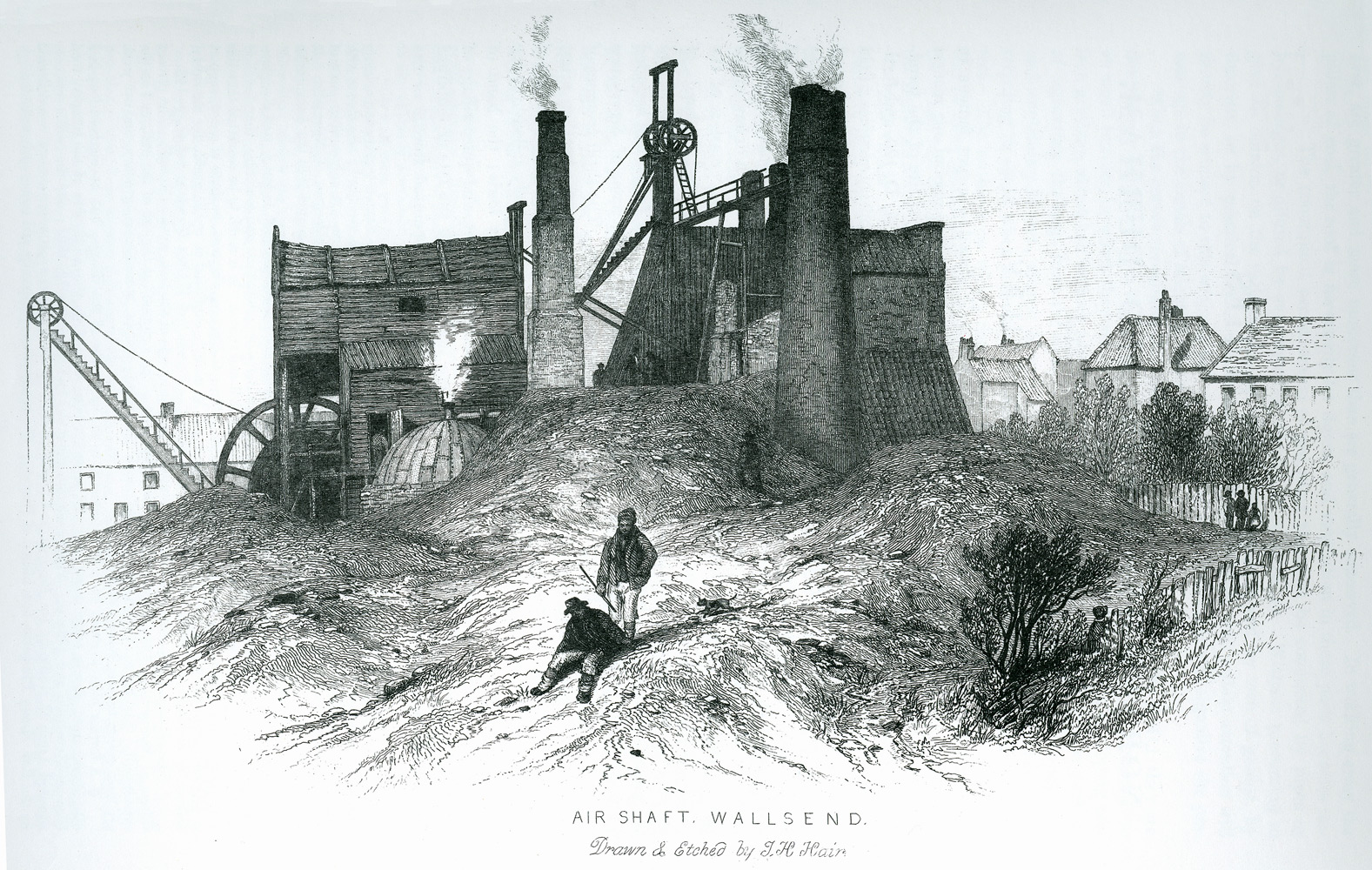
Air Shaft, Wallsend by Thomas Harrison Hair, circa 1838-1844

By the late 1830s his primary inspiration was "the unusual shapes of pit-head buildings with decorative detail of coal-trucks, locomotives and swirling smoke and steam", but his views also typically record the wider coalfield setting including the pumping engines, ponies, cranes, sailing colliers and the "drops" (staithes) used to load them. Many also take in the rural or waterside settings, Hair rendering the waste and weed-strewn spoil heaps as faithfully as the more picturesque rolling hills, ponds and water wheels favoured by his more conventional contemporaries. Hair's legacy is a record of not just his own skill as a painter, drawer and engraver, but also a detailed and objective record of the Great Northern Coalfield at its most prosperous – during the mid-19th century and the Age of Steam.

A selection of his early engravings were published in 1839 by Hair himself operating from an address in Camden Town. In 1844, this was augmented with new works, accompanied by a Preliminary Essay on Coal and the Coal Trade by M. Ross, and republished by James Madden and Co. (London) in association with Hair as Sketches of the Coal Mines in Northumberland & Durham by T.H. Hair or A Series of Views of the Collieries in The Counties of Northumberland and Durham. According to Frank Atkinson, in his preface to the 1969 edition, "he first prepared watercolours (each approximately the same size as the published etchings) and from these the etchings were made, variously by J. Brown, S. T. Davis, T. E. Nicholson and T. A. Prior, and some by Hair himself". Many of these original watercolours were rediscovered in the 1960s and can now be seen at the Hatton Gallery, University of Newcastle upon Tyne.

Because Hair's drawings are today the only extant visual record of how many of these sites looked, they now also have considerable historical importance. Atkinson noted that of the colliery scenes Hair depicted only one was still (partially) intact by the 1960s – the Friar's Goose pumping-engine house above Gateshead – still in operation when Hair drew it, but ruined by the mid-20th century. From this it was possible to make an assessment of the technical accuracy of Hair's drawings. Atkinson noted that "what remained of the engine-house suggests that Hair's detailed observation may be depended upon, and one would only add that he obviously tended to elongate his vertical structures". Atkinson speculates that "this was an unconscious attempt to emphasise the verticality of so many tall buildings, chimneys and the like, and with this one reservation one feels confident in looking upon these illustrations as closely observed and reasonably accurate portrayals of the contemporary scene".

Within a few years of their initial publication, and within Hair's own lifetime, many of his plates were pirated when W. Fordyce used them to illustrate his Coal and Iron (1860) after stripping out their artist and engraver credits, some being crudely "updated" by the addition of features which had not existed at the time of the original drawings.
