= Causey Park House =

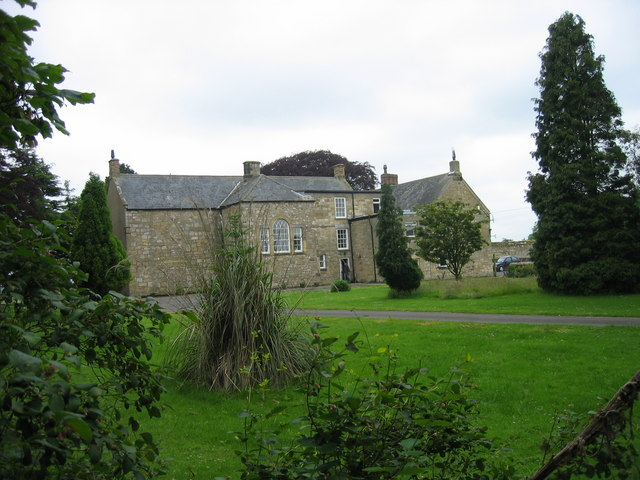
- Causey Park House

- Location in Northumberland

General information
- Location: Northumberland, England
- Coordinates: 55.24797°N 1.72156°W
- OS grid: NZ178949

Causey Park House is a 16th-century former manor house with Grade II listed building status situated at Causey Park, Northumberland, England. The Manors of Ogle (owned by the Ogle family), and Causey Park and Bothal (owned by the Bertrams) were merged by the marriage of Robert Ogle and Ellen Bertram in the 14th century.

The house was built in 1589 for James Ogle on the site of an earlier Bertram house which incorporated a pele tower. Early masonry remains evident despite considerable extension and remodelling during the 18th and 19th centuries.

The Ogle family remained on the estate for over 400 years until it was sold in 1854 to John Hogg.

The property is now a working 1,500-acre (610 ha) farm which offers holiday accommodation
