= Brockley (disambiguation) =

Brockley is a district of London, England.

Brockley may also refer to:

- Brockley (1965 ward), London, England
- Brockley (2002 ward), London, England
- Brockley, Somerset, England
- Brockley, Suffolk, England
- Brockley railway station, London, England
- Brockley Whins, Tyne and Wear, England

== See also ==
- Broccoli (disambiguation)
