= Biddick Hall =

- Area
- Location in Tyne and Wear
- Coordinates: 54.963°N 1.446°W
- OS grid reference: NZ355632
- Sovereign state: United Kingdom
- country: England
- District: South Tyneside

Biddick Hall is an area in the town of South Shields, in Tyne and Wear, England. Biddick Hall is known for its infant and junior school as well as its conveniences and shops. Biddick Hall is a medium-size council estate in the borough of South Tyneside and has many links to South Shields Town Centre and surrounding areas via its bus services run by Stagecoach and Go North East. Biddick Hall is in walking distance to its nearest 'Comprehensive School', Boldon School.
