= Cleadon =

Village in South Tyneside, England

Coordinates: 54.9554°N 1.4008°W

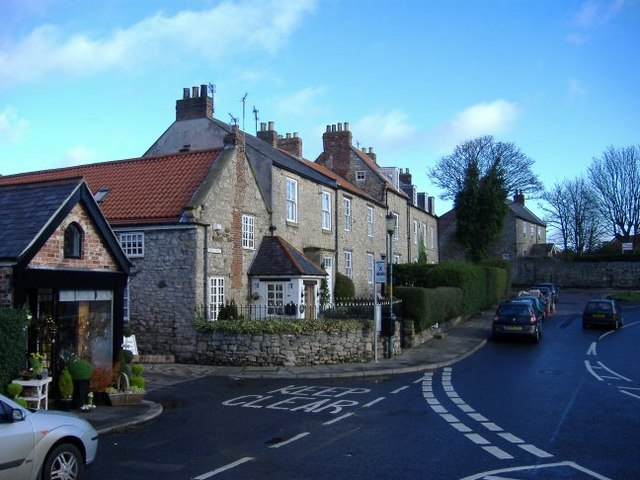
- Houses on Front Street near the centre of Cleadon, to the north of the village pond.

- Location within Tyne and Wear
- Population: 8,427 (Note: 2011. South Tyneside ward of Cleadon and East Boldon)
- OS grid reference: NZ384624
- Metropolitan borough: South Tyneside
- Metropolitan county: Tyne and Wear
- Region: North East
- Country: England
- Sovereign state: United Kingdom
- Post town: SUNDERLAND
- Postcode district: SR6
- Dialling code: 0191
- Police: Northumbria
- Fire: Tyne and Wear
- Ambulance: North East
- UK Parliament: South Shields

Cleadon is a suburban village in South Tyneside in the North East of England. Prior to the creation of Tyne and Wear in 1974 by the Local Government Act 1972, the village was part of the historic County Durham. In the 2011 UK Census the population of the South Tyneside ward of Cleadon and East Boldon was 8,427. Nearby population centres include East Boldon, Whitburn, and Jarrow. The village is located approximately 5 miles (8 km) from the city of Sunderland and 5 miles from the town South Shields. It is situated on the south west of Cleadon Hills, an example of a Magnesian Limestone grassland home to a number of regionally and nationally rare species.

For much of its history, the economy of Cleadon was based around agriculture. Now it is largely residential and has developed as a commuter town. The village has two churches, a primary school, and a commercial core with shops and pubs.

== History ==
The earliest evidence of human occupation in the area around Cleadon dates back to the Mesolithic period (8,000-4,500BC). Although there is no direct evidence of Mesolithic habitation in Cleadon itself, flint scatters have been identified in surrounding sites including St Peter's Church, Monkwearmouth, suggesting hunting parties travelled through the area. It is likely that Neolithic (4,500-2,400BC) farmers were active in Cleadon, evidenced by further discoveries of flint, but the exact locations of any settlements remain unknown.

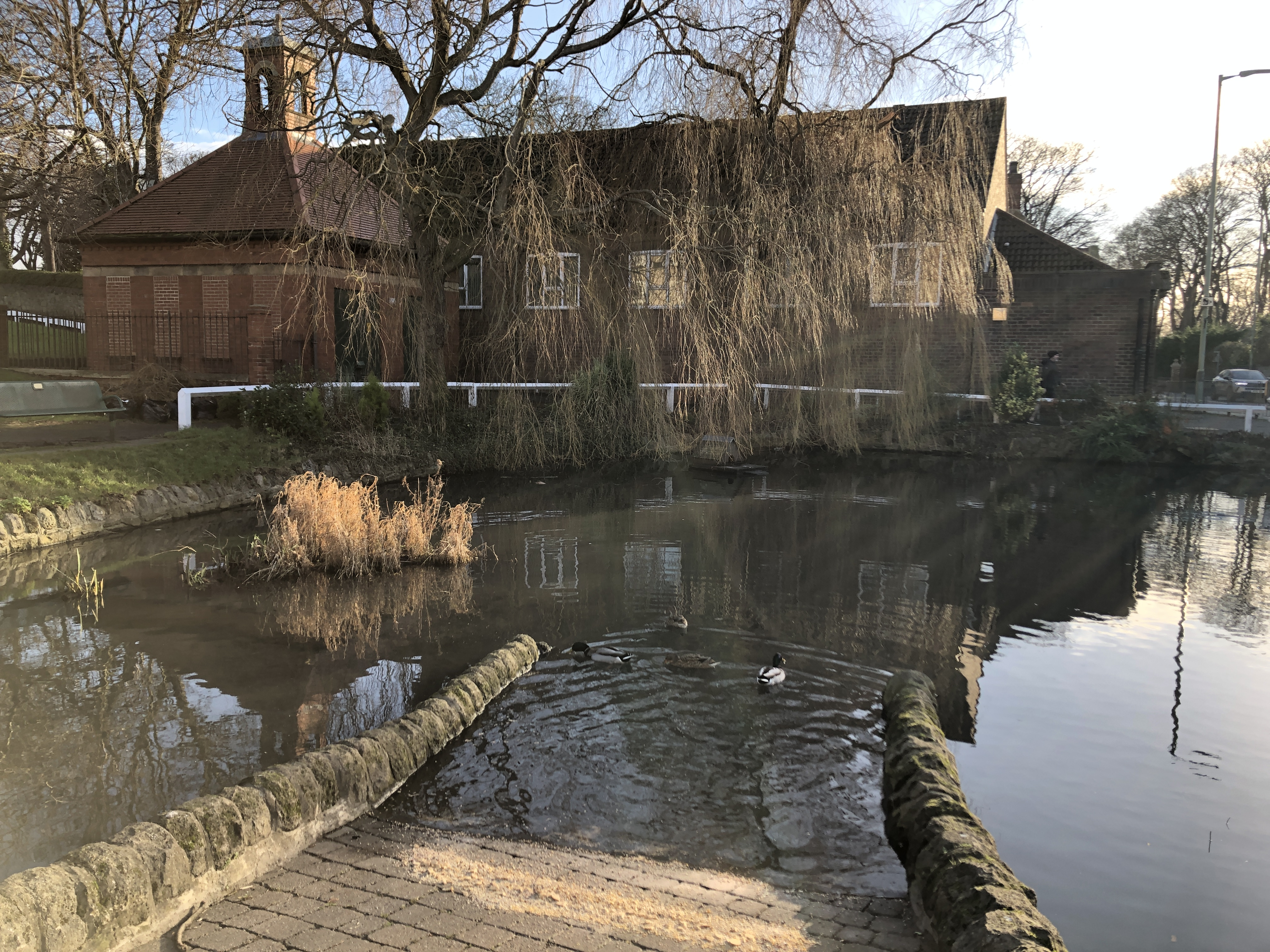
Cleadon pond is likely to have facilitated human settlement in the village for many centuries.

=== Middle Ages ===
Cleadon was first recorded as Clyuedon in the Boldon Book (1183), sharing an entry with Whiteberne, or modern-day Whitburn. The name Clyduedon roughly translates to hill (dun) of the cliffs (clifta). It is of Old English origin. It is likely this name refers to the surrounding landscape. The village is not close to any major rivers, so its water supply was fed by springs and wells. A village pond, which survives today, is likely to have facilitated human settlement for many centuries.

Cleadon and Whitburn's entry in the Boldon Book refers to land ownership, dues, and services, suggesting that a complex administrative system had been in place a number of years before 1183. It also mentions a pound or pinfold which contained stray animals, the location of which today is marked by a plaque which reads:

This building stands on the site of Cleadon Village Pinfold or Pound, recorded in the Boldon Book of 1183. West Park Road was formerly known as Pinfold Lane. Stray animals were collected from Cleadon and Whitburn moors, to the north and south of the village, by the Pinder and kept in the Pinfold until claimed by their rightful owner. The Pinder was a man of responsibility, who held 12 acres of land.

— Cleadon Village History Society

An estimation of the population of the township in the 12th century is around 172. Around 200 years after the Boldon Book, Thomas Hatfield - Bishop of Durham from 1345 to 1381, commissioned the Hatfield survey. This was a more comprehensive population survey which again combined Cleadon and Whitburn as a single parish. The survey reveals changes in land ownership, including the introduction of copyhold tenure and bondsmen. Between the 12th and 14th centuries, the region suffered from the plague which first broke out in 1230s and culminated in the Black Death. It also faced threats of invasion from Scotland during the Wars of Independence. For example, in 1312 Robert the Bruce travelled south from Scotland and raided Hartlepool. A radical change in the climate, the Little Ice Age, also occurred in the early 1300s which led to widespread famine.

Historic Cleadon, or Cleydon (centre), as seen on the map Episcopatus Dunelmensis dating from 1686-1719.
Historic Cleadon, or Cleydon (centre), as seen on the map Episcopatus Dunelmensis dating from 1686-1719.

=== Early modern Cleadon ===
The first representation of Cleadon on a map is in the Dunelmensis Episcopatus, published in 1576 by Christopher Saxton. The village, called Cleydon, is represented by a single building. In the late 16th century, a further survey was conducted of the area, this time distinguishing between Cleadon (listed as Clevedon) and Whitburn. In 1644 during the English Civil War, Cleadon was caught between the Royalist forces of Newcastle and the Parliamentarians of Sunderland, leading to the Battle of Boldon Hill. It was reported that Briar Cottage in Cleadon may have served as a hospital during the war. By the end of the 17th century, enclosure agreements grew throughout the Durham area, whereby copyhold tenants ensured properties were combined into more manageable fields. The Cleadon enclosure agreement is recorded as being in April 1676. Farms dominated the village centre, their development aided by the village pond and rich pastures.

More detailed maps of Cleadon and the surrounding area were produced towards the end of the 18th century. Map of the County Palatine of Durham, published by Andrew Armstrong in 1754, depicts Cleadon Mill and features some of the key landowners of the village. It does not, however, include key features of the area at the time, such as Cleadon Farm and Boldon Lane.

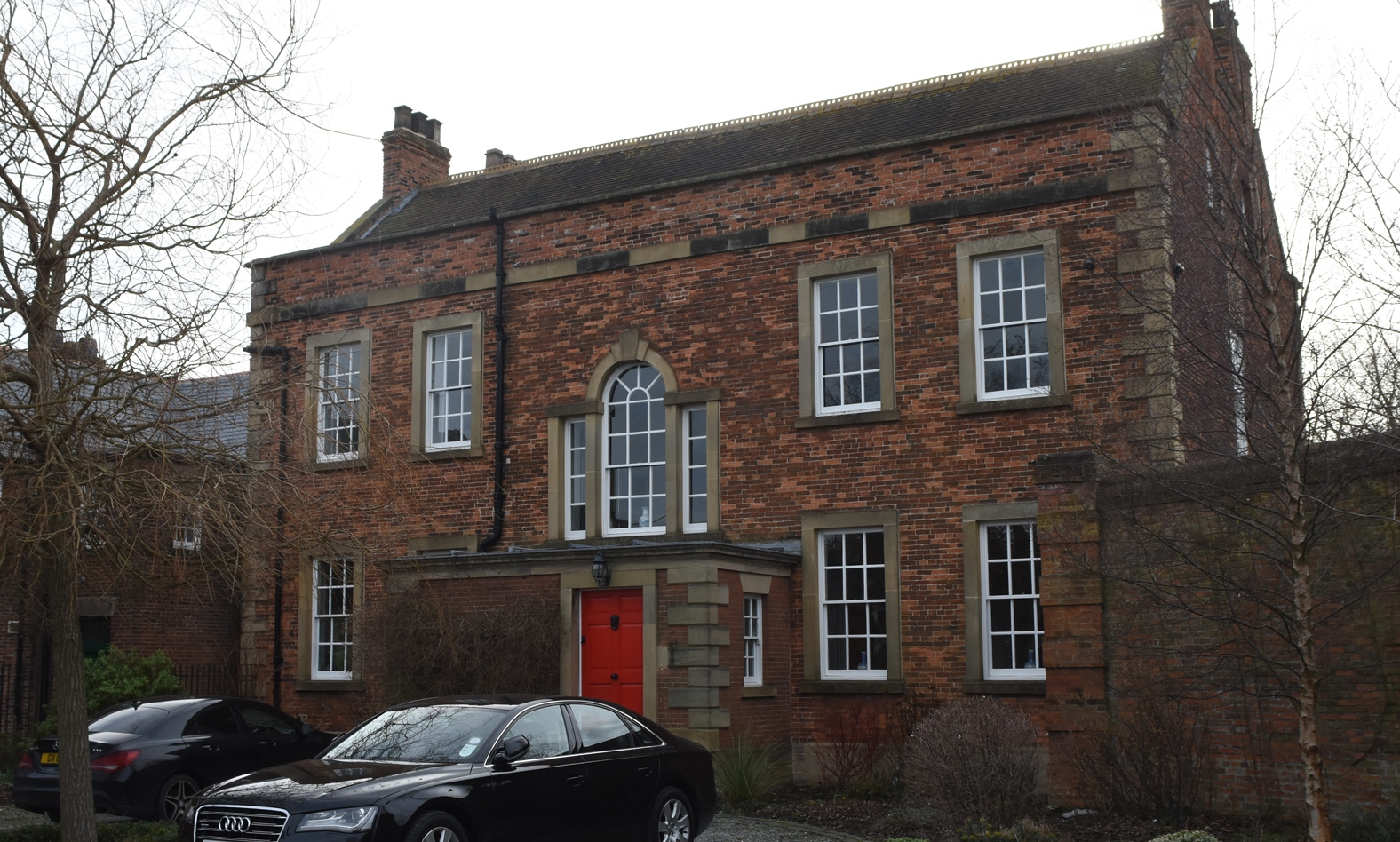
The front of Cleadon House, located on Front Street.

=== 18th and 19th centuries ===
During the 18th and 19th centuries, large mansions with ornamental grounds were built within and on the fringes of the village which would have likely been significant local employers. A surviving example of one of these buildings is Cleadon House which was built by John Dagnia, an influential glass manufacturer, in 1738. It is a two-storey brick 'double pile' building – a relatively new building technique in the 1730s. A blue plaque outside the front of the house reads:

In this house lived John Dagnia. Cleadon House was the family home of John Dagnia, famed for the introduction in the 18th Century of lead crystal, the quality and brilliance of which was unparalleled in Britain at that time. The glass was manufactured at West Panns in South Shields.

A 15-acre pleasure garden was also constructed, featuring terraced lawns, a fruit wall, an ornamental lake and a grotto. Today, little of the 18th-century garden survives. Only a section of the original estate wall, evidence of water features, and the Grade II listed grotto remain in modern-day Coulthard Park. The grotto's design is typical of Picturesque architecture popular in the mid-18th century. The house and estate were bought by the Grey family of Howick; and by marriage passed to Sir James Pennyman, 6th Baronet. They were bought from the Pennyman family in 1813 by Bryan Abbs. The Abbs family were substantial local leaseholders of property in Monkwearmouth, and developers in Roker.

Cleadon Old Hall was another large house constructed in Cleadon in the 18th century, most likely around the time John Dagnia was building Cleadon House. Similarly to Cleadon House, Cleadon Old Hall featured gardens and a pond. It was demolished in the 1960s, but earlier photographs show a grand building stylistic of the Georgian era.

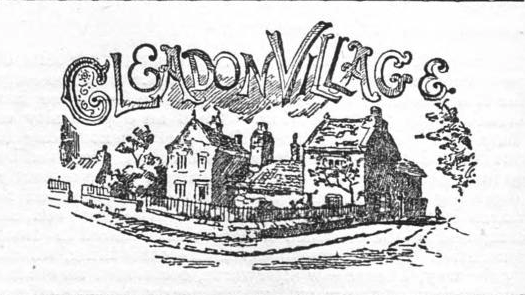
An image of Cleadon Village illustrated by Walter Scott for the Monthly Chronicle of North-Country Lore and Legend, 1891.

In the 1800s, Cleadon still remained part of the wider Whitburn Parish. The population of the parish grew throughout the 1800s from 675 in 1801 to 3,292 in 1901. In a contemporary survey publication, Cleadon was reported to have "a small Methodist chapel, four farmholds, two public houses, and a ladies' boarding school." Cleadon Parochial School opened in 1830 and was later reopened as Cleadon Church School in 1872. In 1891, Walter Scott wrote about Cleadon in The Monthly Chronicle of North-Country Lore and Legend. He describes Cleadon House as "a quaint, picturesque residence ... partly secluded by trees". As for the village itself, Scott remarks that "Cleadon does not materially differ from the ordinary country village." His account includes descriptions of Cleadon Towers (erected in 1890), the three pubs of the village, the village green, the pond, the parish church, and the village school.

Although agriculture remained a key part of the local economy during the 19th century, brick production, tile production, and limestone quarrying became increasingly important industries in Cleadon. In 1855, there was one brickworks active in the village – The Cleadon Brick and Tile Works. By the end of the century there were four, demonstrating the widespread demand for brick during that time. Today, the former clay pits of Cleadon Brick and Tile Works have been flooded and form the Tilesheds Local Nature Reserve, which opened in 1997.

=== Modern times ===
The late 19th and early 20th century saw a migration of affluent citizens into Cleadon, which led to the development of the residential Cleadon Plantation. Cleadon was at this time an attractive distance from the poor living conditions of urban city centres. By the end of the 1800s, there were a variety of tradespeople in the village, including a nurse, a solicitor, a violin-string manufacturer, a hay dealer, a laundress, and numerous labourers. The first railway station in the village area – Cleadon Lane Station – opened in the 1800s. It was renamed to East Boldon Station in 1898 and survives today as East Boldon Metro station.

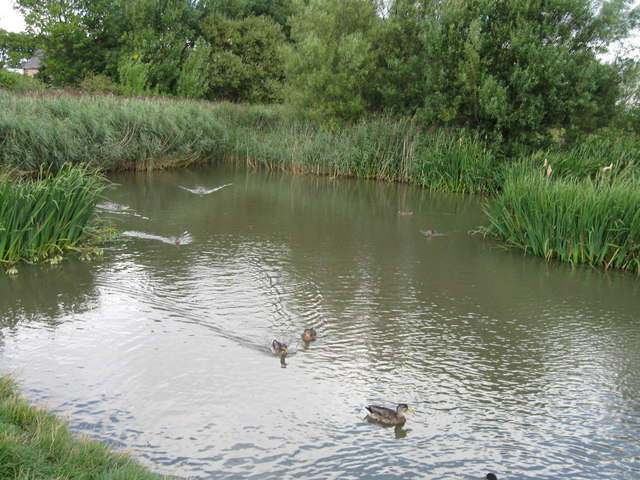
Duck pond in nature reserve adjacent Tileshed Lane, the site of the historic Cleadon Brick and Tile Works.

The most significant change to the layout of the village occurred with the development of the first housing estate in the 20th century – the Cleadon Plantation Housing Estate. It consisted of villa properties which extended across the three main roads to the west of Cleadon House, occupied by affluent citizens such as surgeons and managers.

In 1903, the village school moved to a new premises which today is known as The Old Schoolroom. In 1908, the Cleadon National School for children aged 7 to 13 was opened. A new building was provided in 1909 on Cleadon Lane to accommodate the teaching of children under the care of the Local Authority. This school closed in 1962.

Cleadon played an important part during the First World War. The village was well-positioned between Sunderland and the River Tyne to be a transitional training centre for troops. It also played a role in second line coastal defence. Cleadon Hill Farm served as a landing ground for the 36 Squadron Royal Flying Corp which was in use from April 1916 until December 1917. Cleadon did not suffer any enemy bomb damage during the First World War. However, there was a case of friendly fire when the Tynemouth Battery fired a shell which ricocheted off the water and landed in the garden of Briar Cottage. A 1918 War Office document shows that there were troop accommodation facilities in Cleadon, including in Cleadon Meadow, a Hutment Camp in Cottage Homes, and at Wesley Hall. Throughout Tyne and Wear there were several examples of practice trenches which display a zigzag pattern. Only those at Cleadon Hills are still visible on the ground today. The Cleadon War Memorial was unveiled in November 1920, commemorating the 22 men from Cleadon who died during the war. After the First World War, housing development grew in Cleadon consisting of more villas and smaller semi-detached buildings. Transport to the surrounding local areas also became easier with new bus services to South Shields.

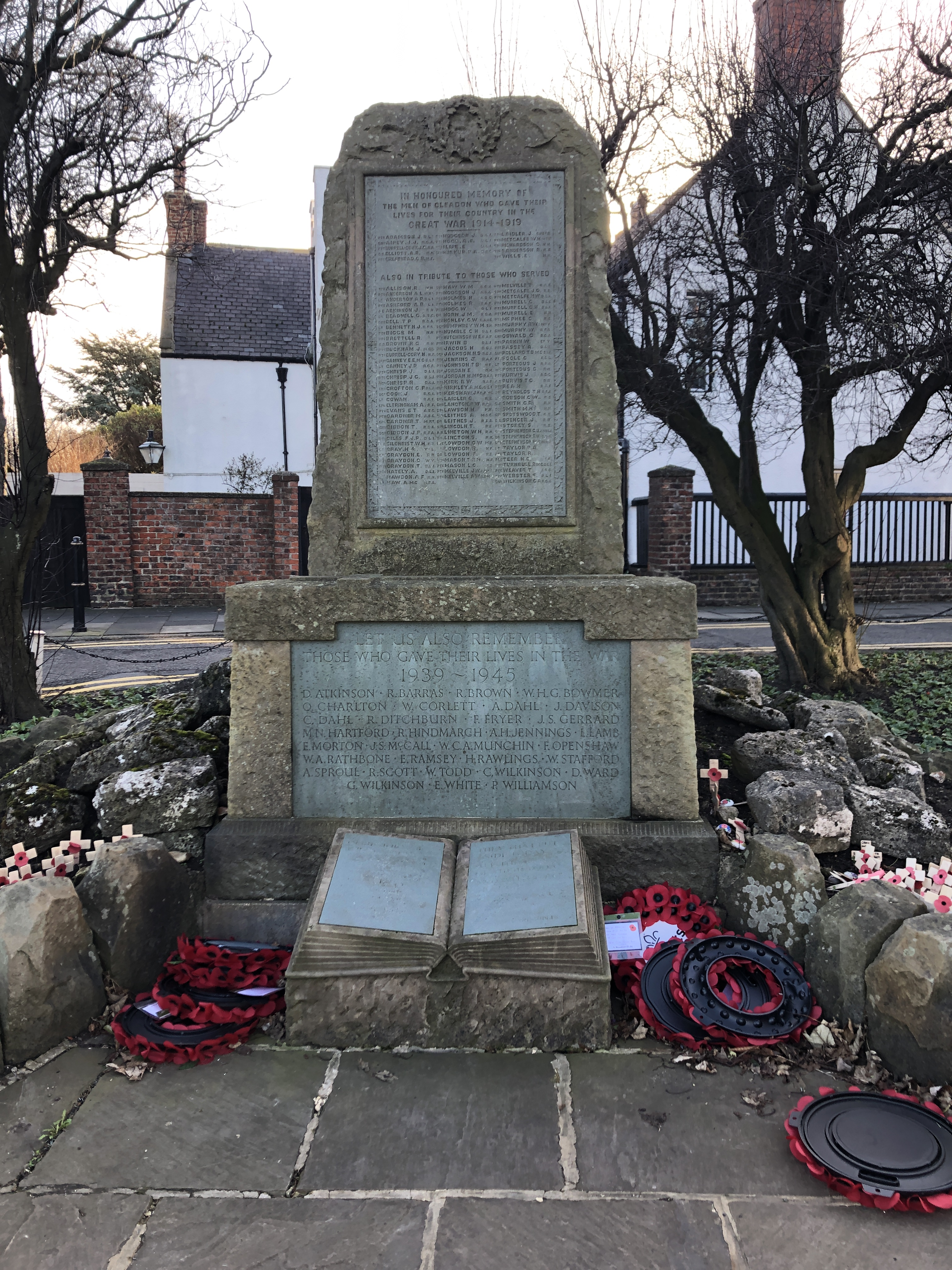
Cleadon War Memorial, unveiled in 1920, commemorates the 22 men from Cleadon who died during the First World War.

Cleadon was at risk of being a German target during the Second World War due to its proximity to both the River Tyne and River Wear. War defences were built along the east coast of England as early of 1938, which included pillboxes, gun emplacements, and minefields. A Heavy Anti-Aircraft Battery was located in Cleadon between February 1940 and January 1946. A searchlight battery was also recorded to be in Cleadon. The Ship Inn pub served as the headquarters of the local home guard. On 15 August 1940, 15 German bombers targeted the Tyneside shipyards. The bombs landed in Cleadon but nobody was killed or badly injured. Cleadon was caught up in a series of bombing raids which followed from 1940 to 1943, some of which resulted in fatalities.

The village expanded quickly in the post-war period with construction on Laburnum Grove and south of Whitburn Road. Cleadon Park Estate also expanded with the grounds of Cleadon Park House purchased by the council and opened as Cleadon Park. Sand and gravel extraction in the grounds of Cleadon House destroyed much evidence of the earlier gardens. The pleasure grounds were purchased by the council, and survive today as Coulthard Park. The demolition of some cottages and other houses in the village in the 1960-70s gave rise to some controversy. Three of the large houses of the village – Cleadon Park, Cleadon Meadows and Cleadon Old Hall – were demolished. In order to accommodate the changes to Sunderland Road and Shields Road, the Ship Inn pub was destroyed and the village pond was reduced in size. In 1963, a new Junior School opened on Boldon Lane.

Pictures of modern-day Cleadon.

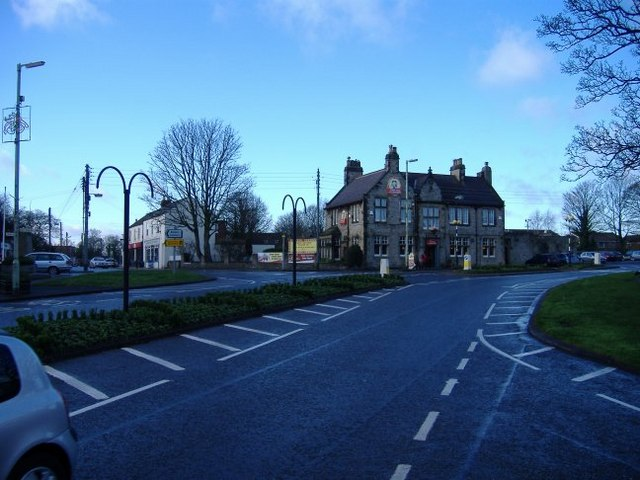
Crossroads in the centre of Cleadon looking towards the Toby Inn Carvery.

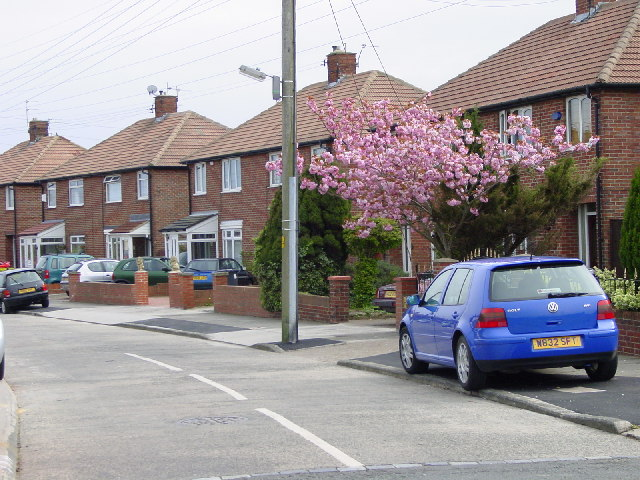
Residential area near Tilesheds Lane.

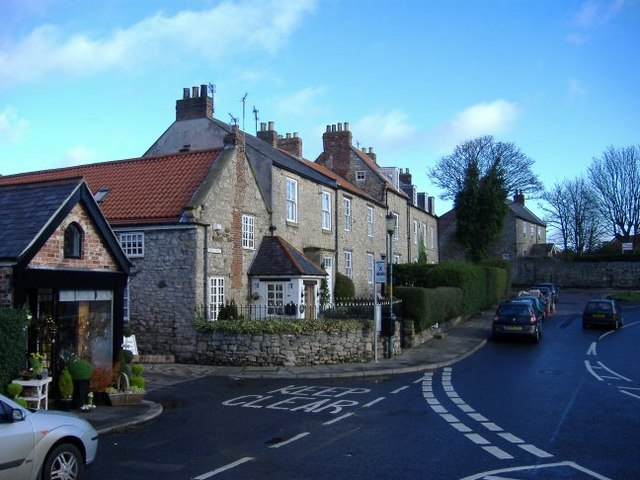
Houses on Front Street near the centre of Cleadon, to the north of the village pond.

==== Conservation Areas ====
In 1975, Cleadon Conservation Area was designated as consisting of the core of the village based on its probable medieval layout. The boundaries of the Conservation Area were extended in March 2004 to include the residential area Cleadon Plantation.

In 1988, Cleadon Pumping Station Conservation Area was designated, consisting of the former pumping station site and Sunniside Farm; the following year it was significantly expanded (from 3 hectares (7.4 acres) to 15 hectares (37 acres)) and renamed Cleadon Hills Conservation Area. The expanded conservation area took in Cleadon Windmill and large areas of adjacent open grassland. The area to the south of the pumping station, which had already been designated a Site of Special Scientific Interest in 1983, was additionally designated a Local Nature Reserve in 1997; while the following year the area to the east of the pumping station was separately designated, as forming part of Cleadon Quarry Site of Nature Conservation Importance (SNCI). The pumping station site itself was similarly designated, as Cleadon Pumping Station SNCI, in 1999.

== Cleadon Hills ==
Outline of Cleadon Hills Local Nature Reserve

Cleadon Hills Local Nature Reserve, located to the north-east of the village centre, is a nationally significant example of Magnesian limestone grassland and a Site of Special Scientific Interest. It is home to wildflowers such as cowslips, wild thyme and autumn gentian that can grow due to the shallow magnesian limestone soil. The limestone landscape was formed by sediments that accumulated on the floor of the Zechstein Sea during Permian times, 290 to 248 million years ago. The limestone is a fundamental aspect to the character of Cleadon Hills. It was quarried to build walls, including the boundary walls of Cleadon Hills and the adjacent farmland, and some of these smaller quarries and cliff exposures remain today. The village of Cleadon is located on the south west scarp of Cleadon Hills.

=== Cleadon Windmill ===
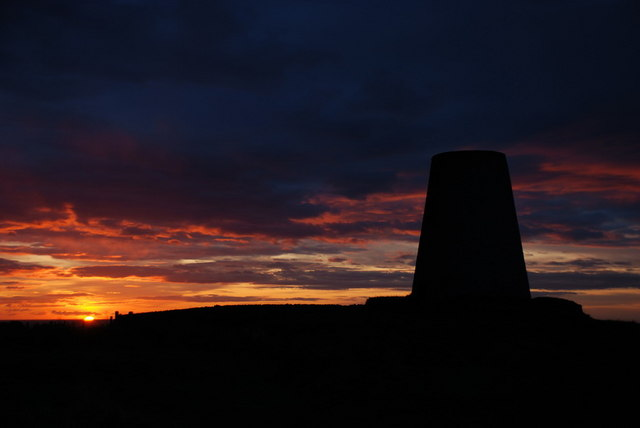
Cleadon Windmill at sunset.

The ruined windmill on the Hills is a Grade II listed building. There has been a mill on the site since at least the 17th century, but the building seen today was first constructed in the 1820s and rebuilt following a storm in 1842. The mill is thought to have been originally built for the Reverend George Cooper Abbs of Cleadon Hall. In 1828, Parson and White's Trade Directory recorded Joseph Watson as the miller at Cleadon Mill. In 1844, Thomas Metcalfe was the miller and by the 1850s it was run by the Gibbons family. The mill ceased operation in the late 19th century. It was further damaged when it was used as a target for gunnery practice during the First World War. Although the mill no longer has its cap and sails, the stone shell remains intact along with a few floor joists. The mill is contained by a wall of limestone. In local mythology, the mill is said to be haunted by the ghost of the miller's daughter – Elizabeth Gibbons – who died of a broken heart.

=== Cleadon Water Tower ===
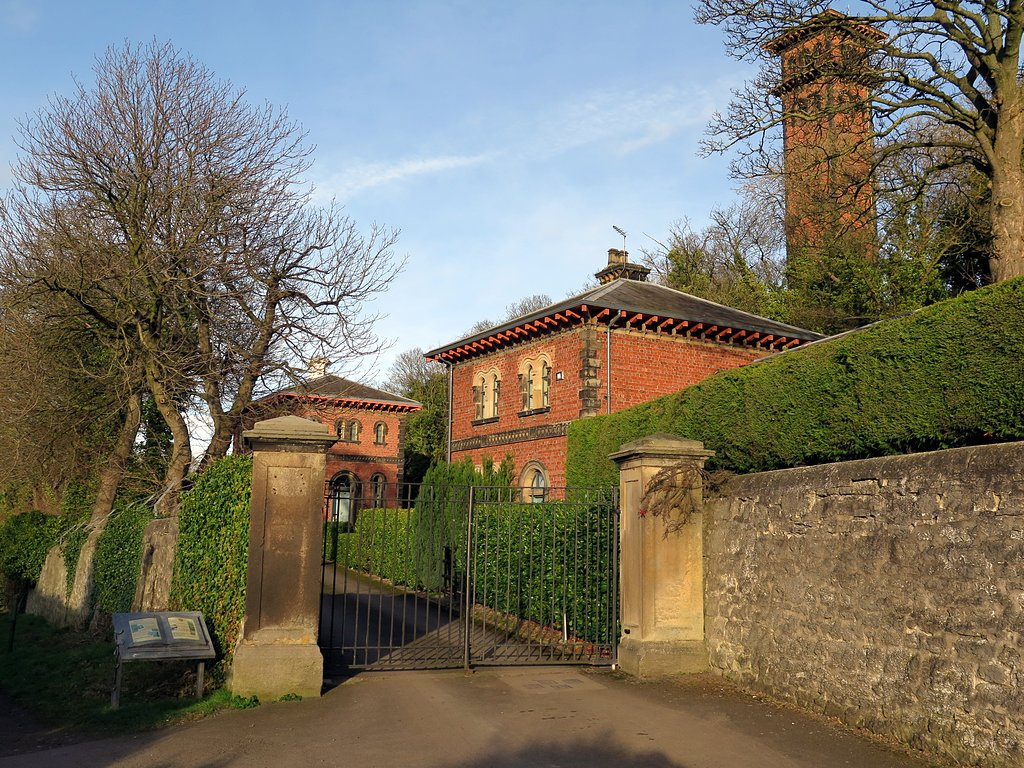
Entrance to Cleadon Water Pumping Station: the engine house, engineman's house and detached chimney (right).

Also on Cleadon Hills is a former water pumping station, consisting of a complex of Victorian Italianate industrial buildings and other associated structures, which once provided water to the South Shields area. The site is dominated by the landmark Cleadon Water Tower, designed to resemble a campanile, which is visible for miles around. This "water tower" was in fact a detached chimney for the boilers of the former steam-powered pumps of Cleadon Pumping Station. The chimney is a Grade II* listed building, while other buildings on the site (namely the engine house and attached boiler house, the adjacent coal store, the engineman's house and worker's cottage) are listed Grade II. The pumping station area is enclosed by a prominent limestone wall.

Cleadon Pumping Station was built for the Sunderland and South Shields Water Company to a design by Thomas Hawksley from 1859 to 1862. It was one of a group of pumping stations owned by the Sunderland and South Shields Water Company with others situated in Humbledon (opened in 1846) and Fulwell (1852). They were constructed to exploit the reserves of clean fresh water that lay trapped in the permeable limestone. The well at Cleadon was 270 feet (82 m) deep. The engine house contained a pair of beam engines, supplied from three Cornish boilers, which drove a combined set of ram and bucket pumps within the well. By 1860, more than one million gallons of water a day were being pumped from the Cleadon's station, and by 1862 it was the largest of the company's ventures with more than twice the capacity of Fulwell and Humbledon. The beam engines were removed in 1930, when electric pumps were installed. The pumping station ceased operating in the early 1970s following the opening of Derwent Reservoir; the site was sold in 1988.

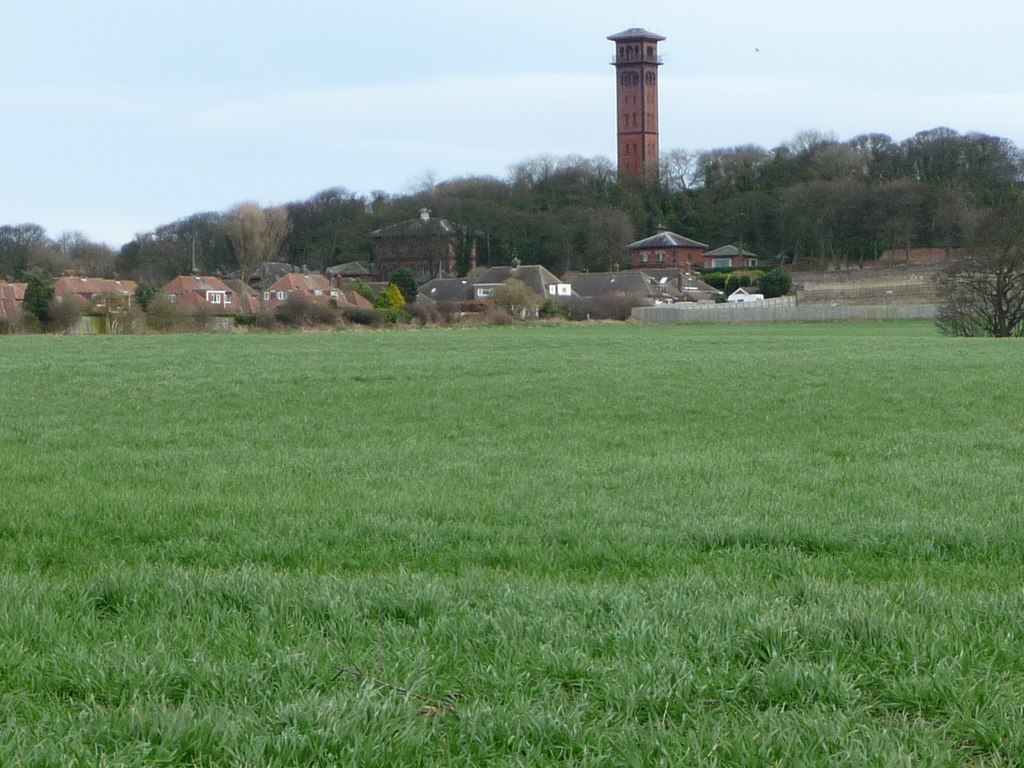
The site viewed from the south-west.

The chimney has balcony which is 82 feet (25 m) above ground level and a spiral staircase of 141 steps winds around the central flue. During the Second World War, the Water Tower was used as a navigation landmark along with other local landmarks such as Souter Lighthouse. The pumping station closed in the 1970s after the opening of the Derwent Reservoir. The chimney is monitored and maintained by the local council, while the other former waterworks buildings have since been converted into homes. The chimney has been used for radio transmission by the emergency services since 1962.

In the grounds of the former pumping station, and described as the most unusual of the structures on the site, is a concrete-domed circular reservoir. The reservoir itself (which is 20 feet (6.1 m) deep and held 2 million gallons of water) is contemporary with the rest of the buildings. Water from the well beneath the engine house was pumped into the reservoir, and then extracted (for public use) at a rate of 1.5 million gallons every twelve hours. The covering structure was added in 1954: it is reputedly the largest unsupported concrete dome in Europe.

Originally, hot water from the beam engines' condensers was fed into a cooling pond at the southern end of the site (redundant after 1930 and since filled in). Water from the pond was then returned to the condensers for re-use by way of an ornamental fountain, in front of the engine house, which remains in situ.

=== Wartime Defences ===
A possible example of a rare First World War pillbox can be found on Cleadon Hills built out of shuttered concrete. Two Second World War pillboxes were also constructed on Cleadon Hills to allow placement of machine gun positions overlooking the fields leading from Whitburn to Cleadon. Only one of these remains today, largely obstructed by overgrown foliage.

Landmarks and views from Cleadon Hills

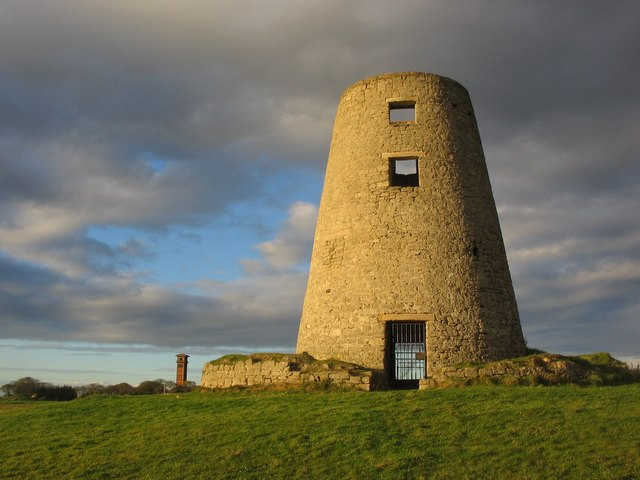
Cleadon Windmill.

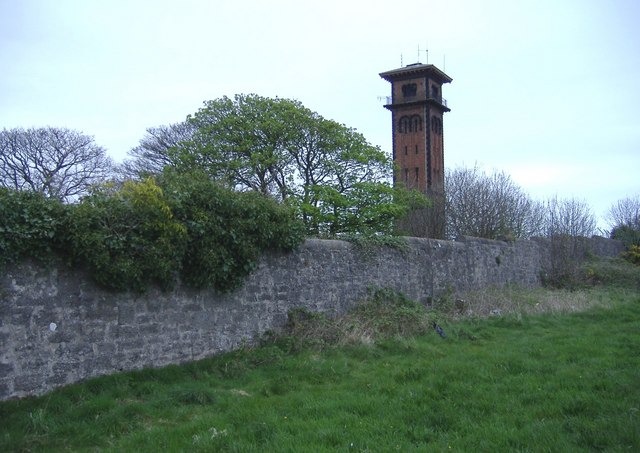
Cleadon Water Tower - the surviving chimney (or campanile) of the old pumping station.

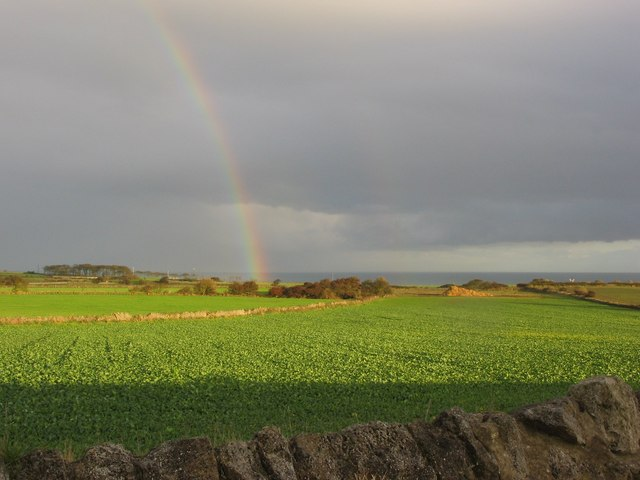
Looking East from Cleadon Hills.

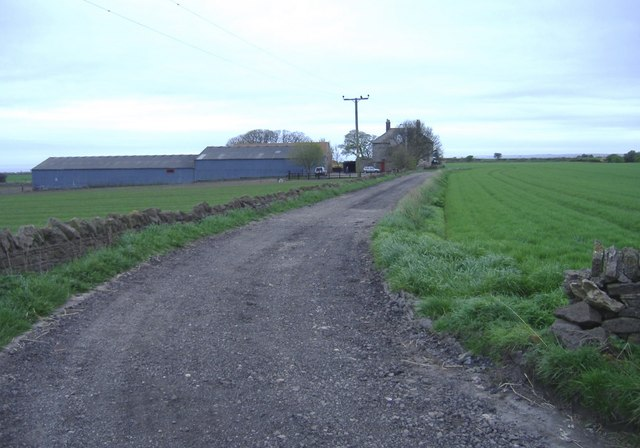
Cleadon Hills Farm.

== Demography ==
Cleadon and East Boldon Ward compared (2011)
	Cleadon and East Boldon Ward	South Tyneside	England
Total population	8,457	148,127	53,012,456
White	96%	95.9%	85.4%
BME	4%	4.1%	14.6%
Aged 0–19	20.2%	22.6%	24%
Aged 65+	24.8%	18.1%	16.4%
Male	47.5%	48.3%	49.2%
Female	52.5%	51.7%	50.8%

In the 2001 UK Census the population of Cleadon was recorded as 4,795. In the 2011 UK Census, the Cleadon and East Boldon Ward had 8,457 usual residents. The average age of the residents was 45.8, slightly above the average for South Tyneside. The vast majority (96%) of residents identified as white and 96.3% were born in the UK. 98.2% of people had English as a main language spoken in their household. The largest religious group was Christianity (75.8% of residents). The majority of residents (57.1%) were in employment with wholesale and retail trade and health and social work activities being the most common industries for the area. The most common occupation was 'Professional' (13.2%).

== Governance ==
In the UK national parliament, Cleadon is part of the Jarrow constituency, represented by Labour MP Kate Osborne since 2019. In the 2019 UK general election, Labour won the seat with a 7,120 vote and 17.5% majority. In local government, Cleadon is part of the South Tyneside Council ward of Cleadon and East Boldon. This ward is represented by Green Party Councillors Shirley Ford, David Herbert and Abbey Muquith.

== Amenities ==
=== Shops and pubs ===
The shopping centre of Cleadon runs along Front Street from the A1018 junction to Cleadon House. There are a selection of gift, antique and fashion shops, hairdressers, a One Stop, a pharmacy, and cafes. There are three pubs in Cleadon: the Britannia Inn (part of the Toby Carvery chain), the Cottage Tavern, and The Stables. The Britannia Inn is located on Front Street. It was built in 1894 on the site of the house of the Matthews, a wealthy family who resided in Cleadon. Today, a stone fireplace from the old Matthew house, dated 1675, can be found in the side room of the pub. The car park of the Britannia Inn is the site of a former field between the pub and historic mansion house Cleadon Meadows. The Cottage Tavern is located on North Street. It was built in the latter half of the 19th century, most likely as a beerhouse. The Stables microbrewery was opened in April 2021 on Front Street.

=== Coulthard Park ===
Coulthard Park in central Cleadon was formerly the grounds of Cleadon House. Today it contains a bowling green, play area, tennis courts, and a pavilion. Some large trees, mostly chestnut, and the 18th century grotto survive from the earlier period of the gardens of Cleadon House. It is commemorated by a blue plaque which reads:

An 18th Century garden ornament overlooking a formal pond originally in the grounds of Cleadon House. Repointed by the Borough of South Tyneside as a contribution to the Cleadon 800 festival in 1983.

Features in Coulthard Park.

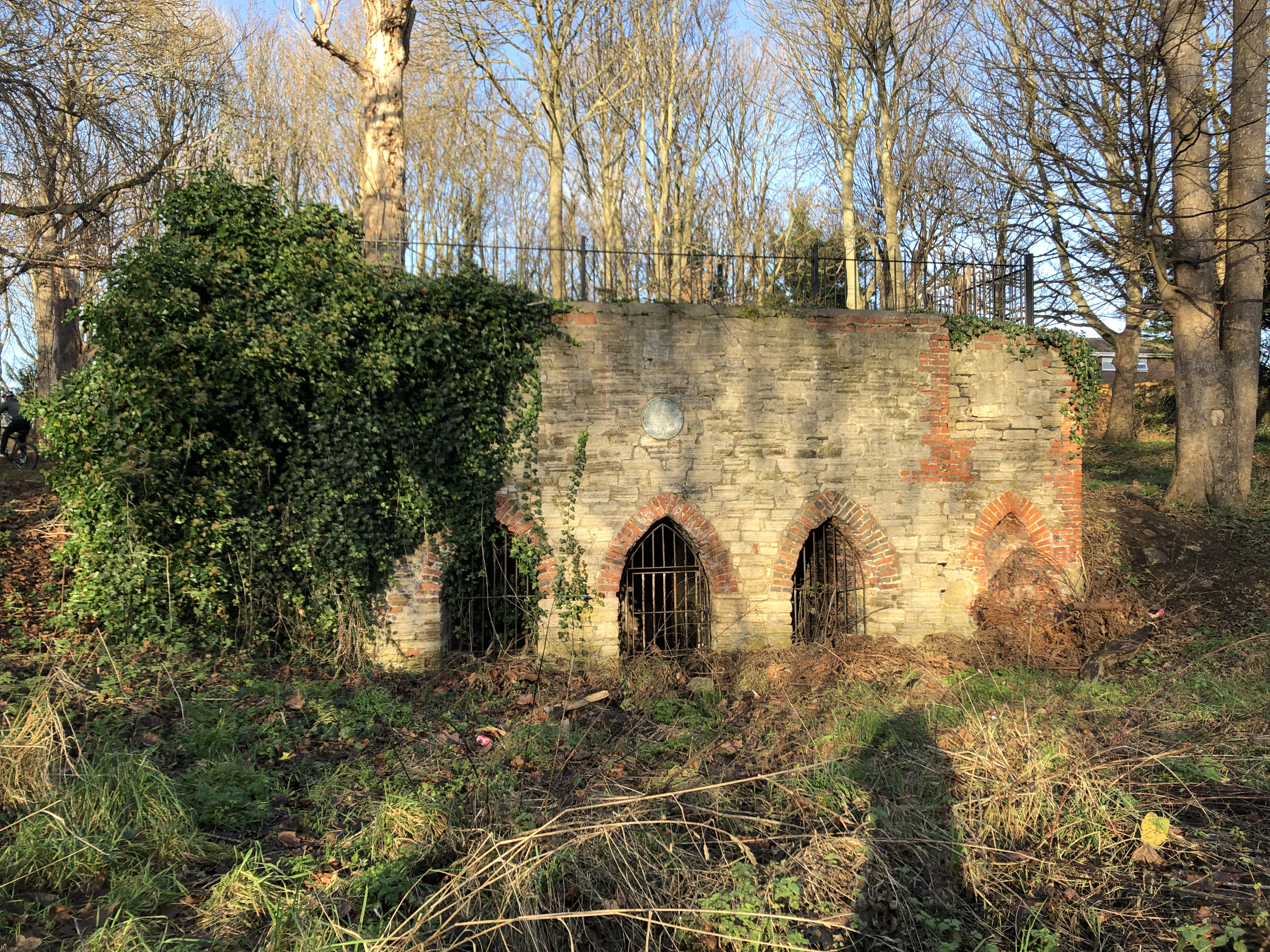
The 18th century grotto in Coutlhard Park.

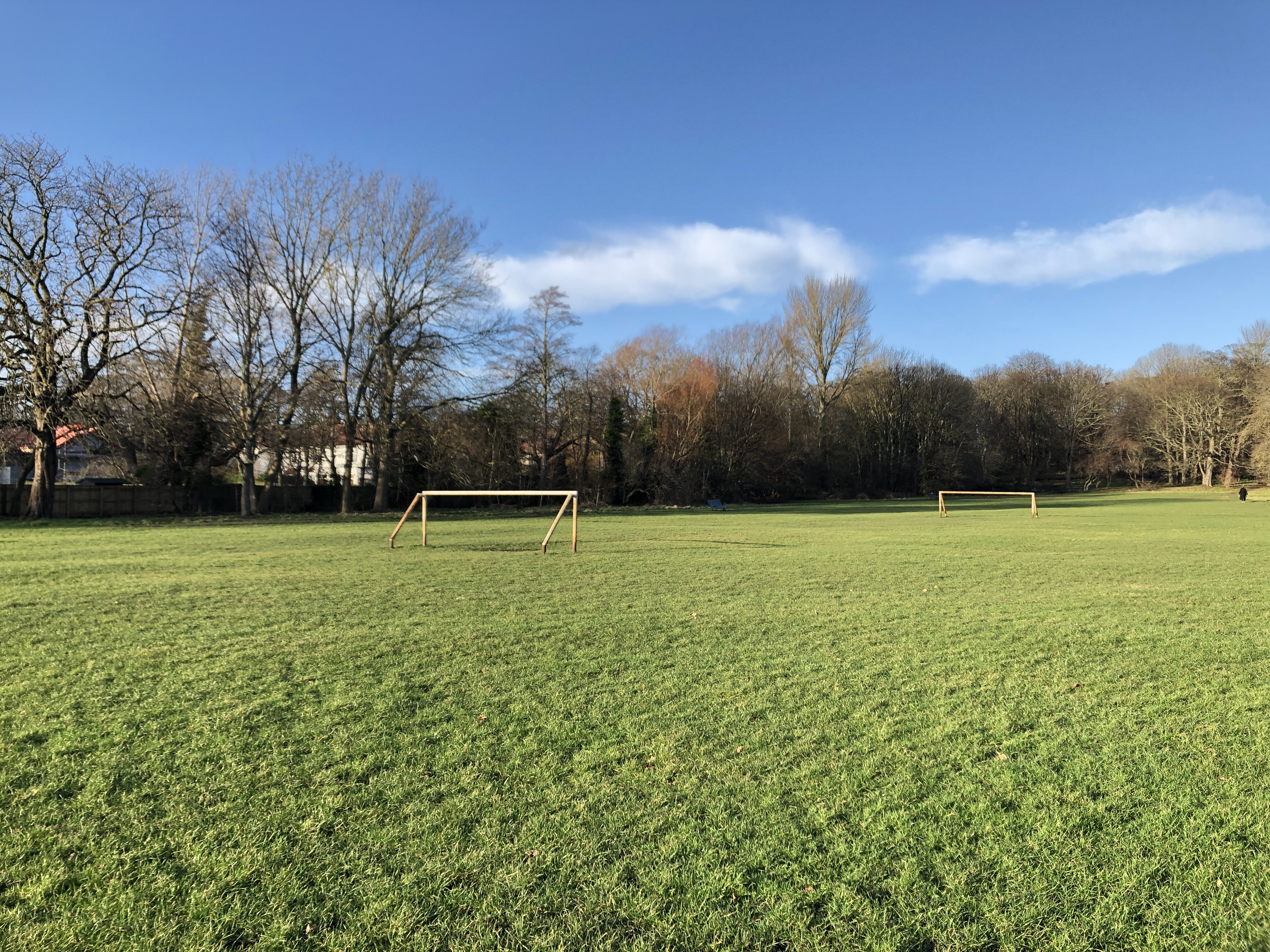
View of the football goalposts in Coulthard Park.

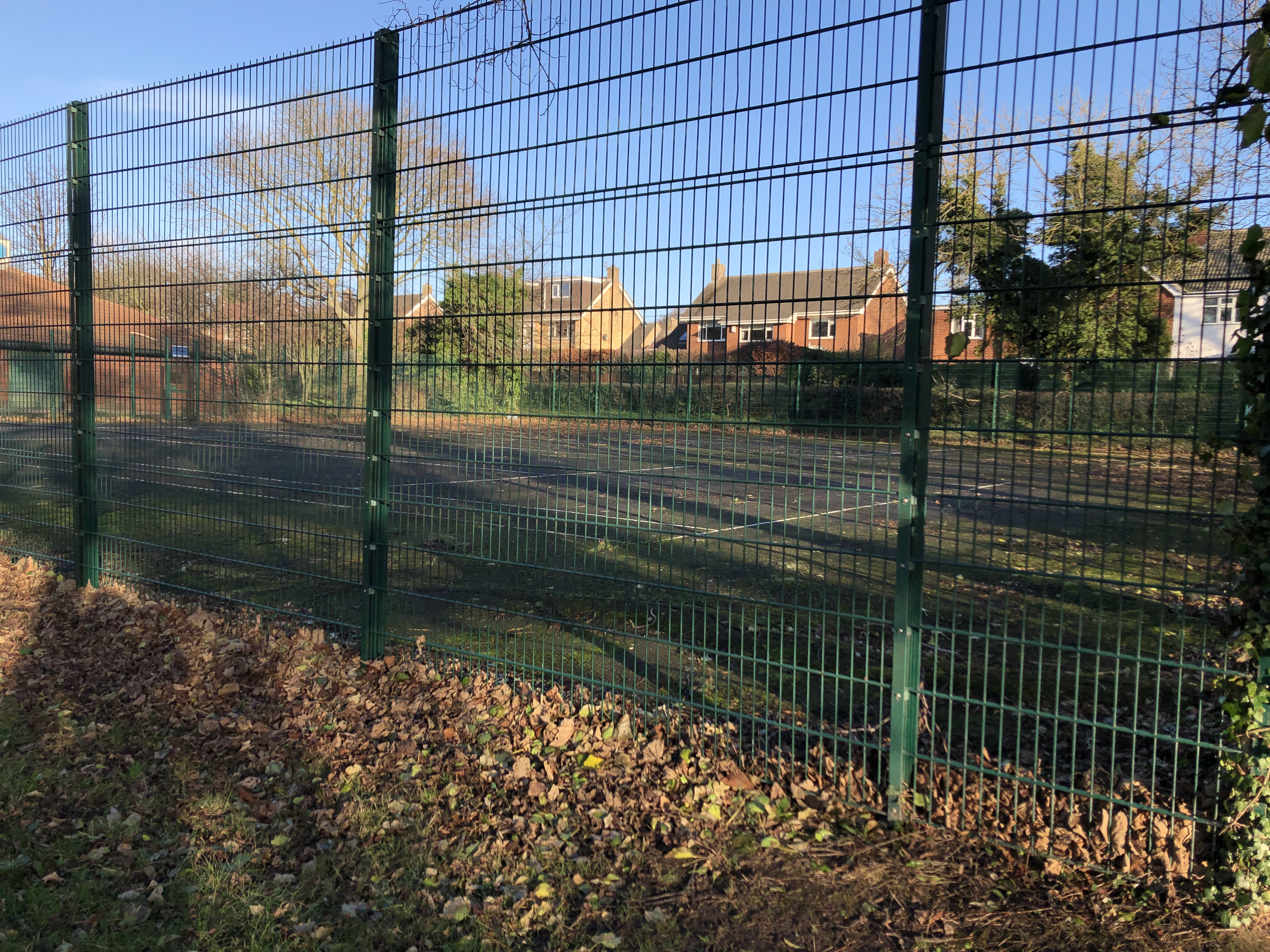
Tennis courts in Coulthard Park.

=== School ===
Cleadon Church of England Academy is the village primary school. It is the result of an amalgamation of the village Infant and Junior Schools in the early 2000s. A new school building was completed in 2007 to accommodate all pupils. The school gained academy status in 2014 and a nursery was added to the site in 2017. The latest Ofsted inspection in 2011 graded the school as 'outstanding'. In 2019, 74% of pupils at the end of Key Stage 2 met the expected standard in reading, writing and maths. This is above both the local authority average of 66% and the England average of 65%. 21% of pupils at the end of Key Stage 2 at Cleadon Academy achieved at a higher standard in reading, writing and math. This is higher than both the local authority average of 12% and the England average of 11%. Reading and maths progress was average and reading was well above average.

=== Churches ===
All Saints is a C of E church located on Sunderland Road. Until the 19th century, the closest church to Cleadon was in Whitburn. All Saints was built due to a desire from villagers to have a place of worship more close by. Permission was granted by the Bishop of Durham to build the church, and construction was completed in 1869. The design of the Church was by R. J. Johnson. The building contains three chancel windows completed in 1912 which depict the various miracles of Jesus. It also contains a War Memorial window unveiled in 1948, and a colourful window depicting the Good Shepherd. Cleadon Methodist Church is located on Sunderland Road. Before a specific church was constructed, Wesleyan Methodist services were held in Cleadon in a farm cottage owned by John Burdon. Burdon was a friend of John Wesley, who had visited Cleadon in 1743. However, in the 19th century residents of the village wanted a designated Methodist church and a foundation stone was laid in May 1899.

=== Transport ===
Cleadon is situated just on the A1018 road between South Shields and Sunderland. The village is close to the East Boldon Metro station. It is also served by the bus operators Go North East and Stagecoach North East.

== Notable people ==
- Don Revie, footballer and manager. Lived in Cleadon.
- Carlo Little, rock and roll drummer. Died in Cleadon.
- Paul Darling, commercial law barrister and current chair of the Horserace Betting Levy Board. Grew up in Cleadon.
- Bill Travers, actor and animal rights activist. Born in Cleadon.
- Simon Brown, cricketer. Born in Cleadon.
