= Broccoli (disambiguation) =

Broccoli is a vegetable.

Broccoli or Brocoli may also refer to:

== Fictional characters ==
- Annie Brocoli, a children's character of Quebecoise singer Annie Grenier (born 1971)
- Broccoli, a nickname of Star Trek character Reginald Barclay

== Music ==
- Broccoli (band), a Scottish punk rock band from Dundee
- "Broccoli" (song), by American rapper DRAM featuring Lil Yachty
- "Broccoli", a song by McFly from the album Room on the 3rd Floor
- "Broccoli", a fan-coined title for the song "Squabble Up" by American rapper Kendrick Lamar
- "Broccoli", a marimba exercise commonly used in front ensemble auditions for Winter Guard International and Drum Corps International

== People with the surname ==
- Albert R. Broccoli (1909–1996), producer of the James Bond film series
- Barbara Broccoli (born 1960), American film producer, Albert R. Broccoli's daughter
- Dana Broccoli (1922–2004), American actress

== Other uses ==
- Broccoli (company), a Japanese media company
- Broccoli (magazine), a cannabis lifestyle periodical
- Broccoli haircut, with tapered sides and layered curls on top
- Broccoli, American slang for cannabis

== See also ==
- Brockley (disambiguation)
