= Seaburn Metro station =

Tyne and Wear Metro station in Tyne & Wear, England

Seaburn
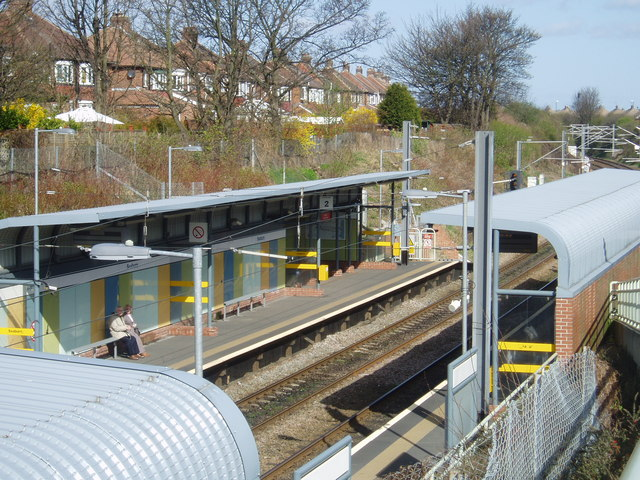

General information
- Location: Seaburn, City of Sunderland; England
- Coordinates: 54°55′46″N 1°23′11″W
- Grid reference: NZ394595
- System: Tyne and Wear Metro station
- Transit authority: Tyne and Wear PTE
- Platforms: 2
- Tracks: 2

Construction
- Parking: 9 spaces
- Cycle facilities: 5 cycle pods
- Accessible: Step-free access to platform

Other information
- Station code: SBN
- Fare zone: B and C

History
- Original company: London and North Eastern Railway
- Post-grouping: London and North Eastern Railway, British Rail (Eastern Region)

Key dates
- 3 May 1937: Opened
- 31 March 2002: Left the National Rail network and joined the Tyne and Wear Metro network

Passengers
- 2024/25: 0.724 million

Services
Preceding station	Tyne and Wear Metro	Following station
Stadium of Light towards South Hylton	Green line	East Boldon towards Airport
Location
- Location within Sunderland Location within Tyne and Wear

Seaburn is a Tyne and Wear Metro station, serving the suburbs of Fulwell and Seaburn, in the City of Sunderland, Tyne and Wear, England. It joined the network on 31 March 2002, following the opening of the Green line extension from Pelaw to South Hylton.

== History ==
The station was opened by the London and North Eastern Railway on 3 May 1937.

As well as East Boldon, Brockley Whins and Heworth, Seaburn was formerly served by rail services operating along the Durham Coast Line between Sunderland and Newcastle. Following the introduction of Tyne and Wear Metro services to Wearside in March 2002, Heworth is now the only remaining intermediate station served by rail services operating between Sunderland and Newcastle.

Along with other stations on the line between Fellgate and South Hylton, the station is fitted with vitreous enamel panels designed by artist Morag Morrison. Each station uses a different arrangement of colours, with strong colours used in platform shelters and ticketing areas, and a more neutral palate for external elements.

== Facilities ==
Step-free access is available at all stations across the Tyne and Wear Metro network, with lifts and ramps providing step-free access to platforms at Seaburn. The station is also equipped with ticket machines, waiting shelter, seating, next train information displays, timetable posters, and an emergency help point on both platforms. Ticket machines are able to accept payment with credit and debit cards, notes and coins. The station is also fitted with smartcard validators, which feature at all stations across the network.

There is a small, free car park available, with nine parking spaces, plus two accessible spaces, as well as a taxi rank. There is also the provision for cycle parking, with five cycle pods available for use.

== Services ==
As of April 2021, the station is served by up to five trains per hour on weekdays and Saturday, with up to four during the evenings and on Sunday.
