= East Boldon Metro station =

Tyne and Wear Metro station in South Tyneside, England

East Boldon
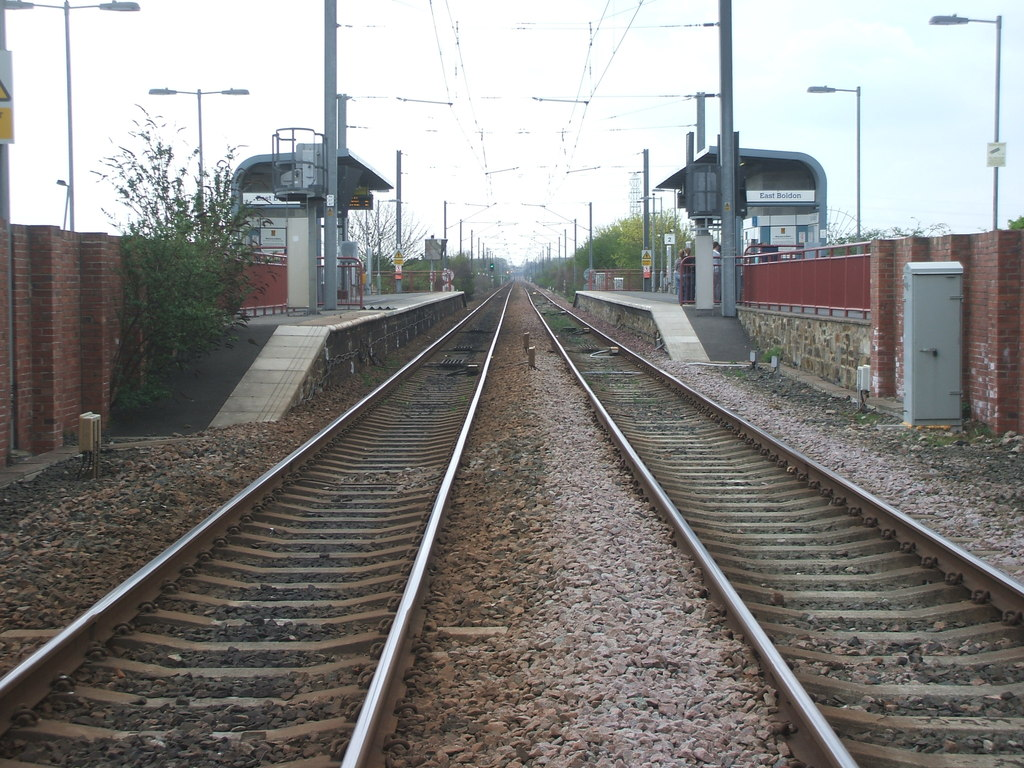

General information
- Location: East Boldon, South Tyneside; England
- Coordinates: 54°56′47″N 1°25′13″W
- Grid reference: NZ372614
- System: Tyne and Wear Metro station
- Transit authority: Tyne and Wear PTE
- Platforms: 2
- Tracks: 2

Construction
- Parking: 58 spaces
- Cycle facilities: 9 cycle lockers; 5 cycle pods
- Accessible: Step-free access to platform

Other information
- Station code: EBL
- Fare zone: B

History
- Original company: Brandling Junction Railway
- Pre-grouping: North Eastern Railway
- Post-grouping: London and North Eastern Railway; British Rail (Eastern Region)

Key dates
- 19 June 1839: Opened as Cleadon Lane
- 1 October 1898: Renamed East Boldon
- 31 March 2002: Left the National Rail network and joined the Tyne and Wear Metro network

Passengers
- 2024/25: 0.636 million

Services
Preceding station	Tyne and Wear Metro	Following station
Seaburn towards South Hylton	Green line	Brockley Whins towards Airport
Location
- Location within Tyne and Wear

East Boldon is a Tyne and Wear Metro station, serving the villages of Cleadon and East Boldon, in South Tyneside, Tyne and Wear, England. It joined the network on 31 March 2002, following the opening of the extension from Pelaw to South Hylton.

== History ==
The station originally opened on 19 June 1839 as Cleadon Lane, under the Brandling Junction Railway. It was renamed East Boldon on 1 October 1898.

Services were operated by steam trains until November 1955, when diesel multiple units took over most services between Newcastle and Middlesbrough; this continued until the Tyne and Wear Metro commenced electric multiple unit services in 2002. Although the passenger service is operated by Nexus, the track is owned and maintained by Network Rail; other operators also use the route, including London North Eastern Railway, Northern Trains, GB Railfreight and Direct Rail Services.

East Boldon was formerly served by National Rail services, operating along the Durham Coast Line between Sunderland and Newcastle. Following the introduction of Tyne and Wear Metro services to Wearside in March 2002, Heworth is now the only remaining intermediate station served by National Rail trains.

The station is fitted with vitreous enamel panels designed by artist, Morag Morrison, along with other stations on the line between Fellgate and South Hylton. Each station uses a different arrangement of colours, with strong colours used in platform shelters and ticketing areas, and a more neutral palate for external elements.

It was used by 319,224 passengers in 2017–18, making it the sixth-most-used station on the Wearside extension.

== Facilities ==
Step-free access is available at all stations across the Tyne and Wear Metro network, with ramped access to platforms at East Boldon. The station is also equipped with ticket machines, waiting shelter, seating, next train information displays, timetable posters and an emergency help point on both platforms. Ticket machines are able to accept payment with credit and debit card (including contactless payment), notes and coins. The station is also fitted with smartcard validators, which feature at all stations across the network.

There is a free car park available, with 58 parking spaces and four accessible spaces, as well as a taxi rank. Nine cycle lockers and five cycle pods are available for use.

== Services ==
The station is served by up to five Green line trains per hour on weekdays and Saturdays, with up to four trains per hour in the evenings and on Sundays.
