= Jack Shreeve =

English footballer

Personal information
- Full name: John Thomas Thornton Shreeve
- Date of birth: 18 August 1917
- Place of birth: Boldon, England
- Date of death: 30 July 1966 (aged 48)
- Place of death: Charlton, England
- Height: 5 ft 11 in (1.80 m)
- Position: Left back

Youth career
- Boldon Villa

Senior career*
Years	Team	Apps	(Gls)
1935–1951	Charlton Athletic	145	(0)
- * Club domestic league appearances and goals

John Thomas Thornton Shreeve (18 August 1917 – 30 July 1966) was an English professional footballer who played as a left back.

== Career ==
After playing non-league football with Boldon Villa, Shreeve made 145 appearances in the Football League for Charlton Athletic.

== Honours ==
Charlton Athletic

- FA Cup: 1946–47; runner-up: 1945–46
