= Boldon School =

Location
- New Road; Boldon Colliery; Tyne and Wear, NE35 9DZ; England
- Coordinates: 54.9493°N 1.4487°W

Information
- Type: Community school
- Local authority: South Tyneside
- Department for Education URN: 108730 Tables
- Ofsted: Reports
- Head Teacher: Louise Pippin
- Gender: Coeducational
- Age: 11 to 16
- Enrolment: 987 as of December 2022
- Website: http://boldonschool.com/

Boldon School is a coeducational secondary school located in Boldon Colliery, South Tyneside, England.

== History ==
A community school administered by South Tyneside Metropolitan Borough Council, it has a specialism in sports. The school relocated to a new £17.5 million building in 2006.

=== 1997 arson attack ===
A £100,000 humanities building was destroyed on the afternoon of Saturday 25 January 1997, requiring eight fire crews.

== Curriculum ==
Boldon School offers GCSEs, BTECs and Cambridge Nationals as programmes of study for pupils. The school also operates a vocational sixth form which offers NVQs and further BTECs.

== Notable former pupils ==
- Simon Brown, professional cricketer
- Shaun Reay, footballer
- Steve Robson, music producer
- Wes Saunders, footballer
