= Brockley Whins Metro station =

Tyne and Wear Metro station in South Tyneside, England

Brockley Whins
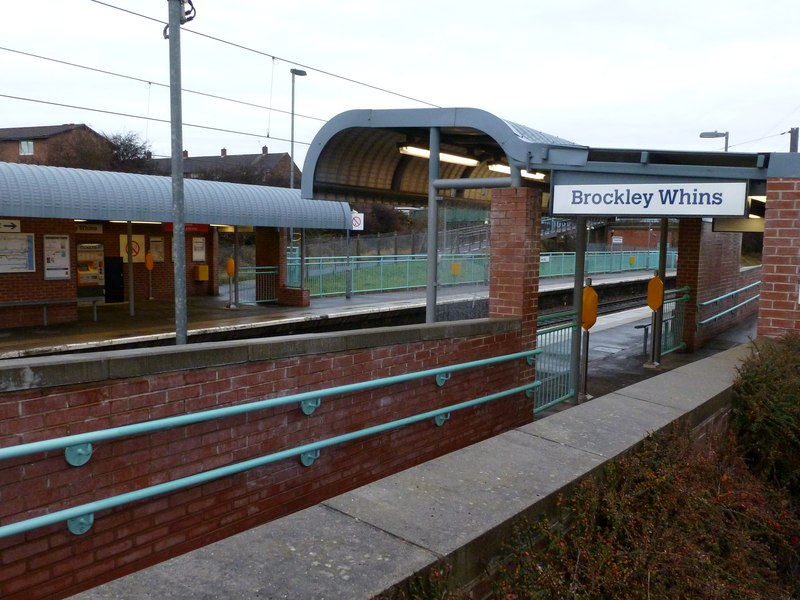

General information
- Location: Brockley Whins, South Tyneside; England
- Coordinates: 54°57′34″N 1°27′38″W
- Grid reference: NZ345628
- System: Tyne and Wear Metro station
- Transit authority: Tyne and Wear PTE
- Platforms: 2
- Tracks: 2

Construction
- Cycle facilities: 5 cycle pods
- Accessible: Step-free access to platform

Other information
- Station code: BYW (Note: The station's code was BNR, prior to conversion to the Tyne and Wear Metro)
- Fare zone: B

History
- Original company: Brandling Junction Railway
- Pre-grouping: North Eastern Railway
- Post-grouping: London and North Eastern Railway, British Rail (Eastern Region)

Key dates
- 9 March 1840: Opened as Brockley Whins
- 19 June 1844: Resited
- 1 March 1925: Renamed Boldon Colliery
- 8 July 1991: Renamed Brockley Whins
- 31 March 2002: Left the National Rail network and joined the Tyne and Wear Metro network

Passengers
- 2024/25: 0.433 million

Services
Preceding station	Tyne and Wear Metro	Following station
East Boldon towards South Hylton	Green line	Fellgate towards Airport
Location
- Location within Tyne and Wear

Brockley Whins is a Tyne and Wear Metro station, serving the suburbs of Boldon Colliery and Brockley Whins, in South Tyneside, Tyne and Wear, England. It joined the network on 31 March 2002, following the opening of the Green line extension from Pelaw to South Hylton.

== History ==
The original station opened in June 1839, as part of the Brandling Junction Railway, and consisted of only one platform, located on the line towards Newcastle. This meant that trains towards Sunderland were required to cross over onto the opposite track, in order to allow passengers to board and alight – an arrangement quite common on other railways in the area, such as Crook. This arrangement resulted in an accident on 6 December 1870, causing five deaths. The subsequent investigation led to changes in the law, as well as the construction of a second platform, to the east of the existing one, to serve Sunderland-bound trains. When the station was converted for use by the Tyne and Wear Metro, the westbound platform was relocated opposite the newer eastbound platform.

The station was originally a busy junction, as the former Stanhope and Tyne Railway route from Tyne Dock to Consett and Waskerley via Washington crossed the Brandling Junction Railway on the level, just to the east of the station at Pontop Crossing, with various curves being laid in to connect the two routes. Since the 1850s, passenger traffic has only taken place on the present east–west route; however, the former north–south line was used by freight traffic as late as 1966. The station was renamed Boldon Colliery by the London and North Eastern Railway in March 1925, but reverted to its original name in July 1991.

As well as Seaburn, East Boldon and Heworth, Brockley Whins was formerly served by rail services operating along the Durham Coast Line between Sunderland and Newcastle. Following the introduction of Tyne and Wear Metro services to Wearside in March 2002, Heworth is now the only remaining intermediate station served by rail services operating between Sunderland and Newcastle.

== Facilities ==
Step-free access is available at all stations across the Tyne and Wear Metro network, with ramped access to platforms at Brockley Whins. The station is also equipped with ticket machines, waiting shelter, seating, next train information displays, timetable posters and an emergency help point on both platforms. Ticket machines are able to accept payment with credit and debit cards, notes and coins. The station is also fitted with smartcard validators, which feature at all stations across the network.

There is no dedicated car parking available at this station. There is the provision for cycle parking, with five cycle pods available for use.

== Services ==
As of April 2021, the station is served by up to five trains per hour on weekdays and Saturday, and up to four trains per hour during the evening and on Sunday.

== Art ==
Along with other stations on the line between Fellgate and South Hylton, the station is fitted with vitreous enamel panels designed by artist, Morag Morrison. Each station uses a different arrangement of colours, with strong colours used in platform shelters and ticketing areas, and a more neutral palate for external elements.
