= Bryan Abbs =

English landowner and magistrate for County Durham

Bryan Abbs (1771–1850) was an English landowner and magistrate for County Durham. He was involved in promoting the construction of the north dock at Monkwearmouth, and property development north of the River Wear.

== Background and early life ==
He was born on 23 April 1771, the son of the Rev. Cooper Abbs and his wife Ann. He attended the grammar school at Witton-le-Wear. He lived in Thomas Street, Monkwearmouth. In 1803 he resided at Shotley Hall, just over the Northumberland border. After a spell at Witton-le-Wear he moved to Cleadon in 1813.

=== Cooper Abbs I ===
Cooper Abbs I (1738–1800) was a son of Jeremiah Abbs of Sunderland. He was graduate (B.A. 1760) and Fellow of Magdalene College, Cambridge, and married his cousin "Nanny", daughter of William Abbs of Monkwearmouth in 1764. The Cooper name came into the family from William Cooper, his great-uncle, who left him property at Little Cowden, Yorkshire. He became a magistrate in Sunderland, where in 1785 with William Ettrick, another magistrate, he was signatory to a petition for a garrison in the town.

Abbs acted as curate at Monkwearmouth in place of the absentee Joseph (or John) Wilkinson in the 1790s; and farmed an estate near Roker. He is not to be confused with his cousin, of the same name, who owned, with John Stafford, land, a maltings and a brewery on Monkwearmouth Shore. Cooper Abbs & Co. is mentioned in a directory of 1795–6, and early in the 19th century it owned five breweries. One of those was later purchased by James Deuchar, and then became part of Newcastle Breweries. The company, and Abbs himself in a personal capacity, underwrote the Wear Bank in a financial panic of 1803.

== Property holdings ==
The Abbs family were substantial leaseholders of property in Monkwearmouth, holding from the dean and chapter of Durham Cathedral; they went on to be developers in Roker. At the time when John Dobson was building Roker Terrace for Sir Hedworth Williamson, in the 1840s, the Abbs family leased much of the land to the north. They did not own land on the coast south of the Gill.

In 1818–9, Bryan Abbs was on the River Wear Commissioners' Survey Committee, membership of which was restricted by income or property conditions. It is taken that by this time he was prosperous.

== Local affairs and politics ==
=== John Ambrose Williams case ===
In 1822, Abbs served on the special jury that tried John Ambrose Williams, printer and publisher of the Durham Chronicle, for a libel. It was brought on behalf of the dean and chapter of Durham Cathedral: Williams had used the Chronicle to criticise them in 1821 for not ringing the cathedral bells on the death of Queen Caroline. The case on a criminal information pitted Robert Scarlett against Henry Brougham. The jury instructed by George Wood found for the prosecution in August 1822, but the case went no further. At the time, the case was thought to have prompted by the Tory cleric Henry Phillpotts, which he denied; and he was attacked in the Edinburgh Review in November of that year.

=== Infrastructure ===
In local affairs, Abbs was on the 1825 committee for building a suspension bridge between North Shields and South Shields, over the River Tyne. But nothing came of it. A South Shields Improvement Act was passed by Parliament in 1829. Steam ferries across the Tyne were introduced, under this Act

Abbs was a leader in the promotion of the north dock at Monkwearmouth, involving Sir Hedworth Williamson, 7th Baronet. He opposed successfully, as leader of a group of local landowners with concerns, an 1832 bill in parliament for a railway line connecting Monkwearmouth to South Shields. On the other hand, he in 1835 chaired a public meeting to promote a railway line from Gateshead to South Shields.

=== Magistracy and the Jobling case ===
The 1829 Act of Parliament put some civic affairs of South Shields in the hands of a commission of local magistrates, of whom Abbs was one. The policing of the town for the first time became an issue. Only two of the magistrates actually lived in South Shields.

One of those magistrates, Nicholas Fairles, died on 21 June 1832 after being assaulted on 11 June, at the time of a miners' strike. He was riding alone to Jarrow Colliery, then the only resident South Shields magistrate. Ralph Armstrong and William Jobling were accused of murder, and Jobling was arrested and convicted at Durham Assizes. Abbs and William Lorraine as magistrates did not oversee the procedure under which Jobling was executed, but led the ceremony in which Jobling's body was taken to Jarrow Slake and hung in chains on a gibbet. The sentence as given by Sir James Parke took into account a change in treatment of murderers in the Anatomy Act 1832.

=== Party politics and the ballot ===
Abbs was a Whig supporter. At a large meeting on 19 August 1834 in the Guildhall, Newcastle upon Tyne, he gave one of the four addresses of congratulation to Earl Grey, the outgoing Prime Minister. On 29 August 1837 he chaired a meeting at South Shields on the secret ballot, at which the sitting Member of Parliament Robert Ingham spoke, as did his successor John Wawn. A resolution in favour of the ballot was passed.

== Brig Bryan Abbs (Jarrow, 1834) ==
In September 1834, the brig Bryan Abbs was for sale at an East London dock. It had been built, as a snow, by Straker & Co. at Jarrow, completed July 1834. It was bought by Francis Spaight (1790–1861), a merchant at Limerick, who in 1835 commissioned the Francis Spaight at Monkwearmouth. By 1836, the Bryan Abbs was sailing from Limerick to Quebec, taking emigrants.

The Bryan Ross was abandoned at sea on 18 April 1850, on a voyage from New York to Limerick. The crew were rescued by the Devon, and landed at St John's, Newfoundland on 21 May.

== Death ==
Bryan Abbs died on 13 January 1850, at home in Cleadon House.

== Family ==
Abbs married Rachel Kirkup in May 1798. She died aged 76 in 1847.

- Their eldest child, George Cooper Abbs, was born in July 1798, at Walworth Grange.
- Cooper Abbs II (died 1872), the second son, was a solicitor and became clerk to the Sunderland borough magistrates. He was a Liberal in politics.
- Charles Cooper Abbs M.D. (died 1841 aged 36). He graduated at Edinburgh University in 1828.
- Their eldest daughter Ann Elizabeth was born in 1800. She married in 1823 John Maling II, in Bishopwearmouth. It was his second marriage: he had married first a daughter of John Allan of Sunnyside, (or Robert Allan), in 1807. Their only daughter Sophia married in 1844 the Rev. Charles Turner of Hanwell Park; who had previously married Katharine Green, daughter of the Rev. James Carter Green, in 1836. She announced her conversion to Catholicism in 1851.
- Their daughter Sophia Rachel married in 1830 Arthur Todd Holroyd.
- William Cooper Abbs, the youngest son, died in 1841 aged 34.

=== George Cooper Abbs II ===
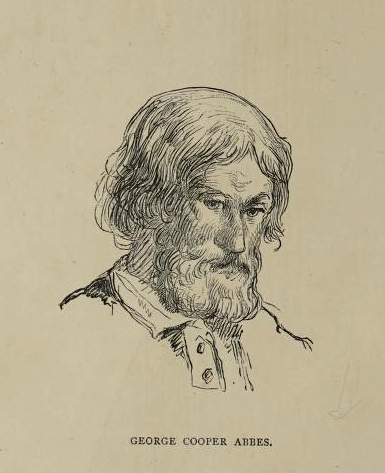
George Cooper Abbs II in later life

Bryan's brother George Cooper Abbs I was an Oxford graduate. His son, George Cooper Abbs II, was a Cambridge graduate who took holy orders. He affected the spelling Abbes of the family name.

George Cooper Abbs the younger went to the parsonage boarding school at Ovingham under the Rev. James Birkett, and to Witton le Wear School, under the Rev. George Newby; and then Richmond School under James Tate. He matriculated at St John's College, Cambridge in 1817, graduating B.A. in 1821. He was ordained deacon in 1823: Henry Phillpotts, at that time rector of Stanhope, Durham, was involved, as examiner satisfied of Abbs's soundness on baptismal regeneration. He went on to a curacy at Dalton-le-Dale and ordination as priest at Durham in 1824.

Abbs had a further curacy at Gateshead, at a period where the parish had an outbreak of the 1831/2 cholera pandemic. There he was under John Collinson, father-in-law of Thomas Baker who was rector of the parish of Whitburn, County Durham in which Cleadon lay. He also had a chaplaincy with Algernon Percy, 1st Earl of Beverley. Abbs's preferment then faltered. In later life he had no benefice. He often took services for Baker at Whitburn, and sometimes for Richard Wallis at Seaham.

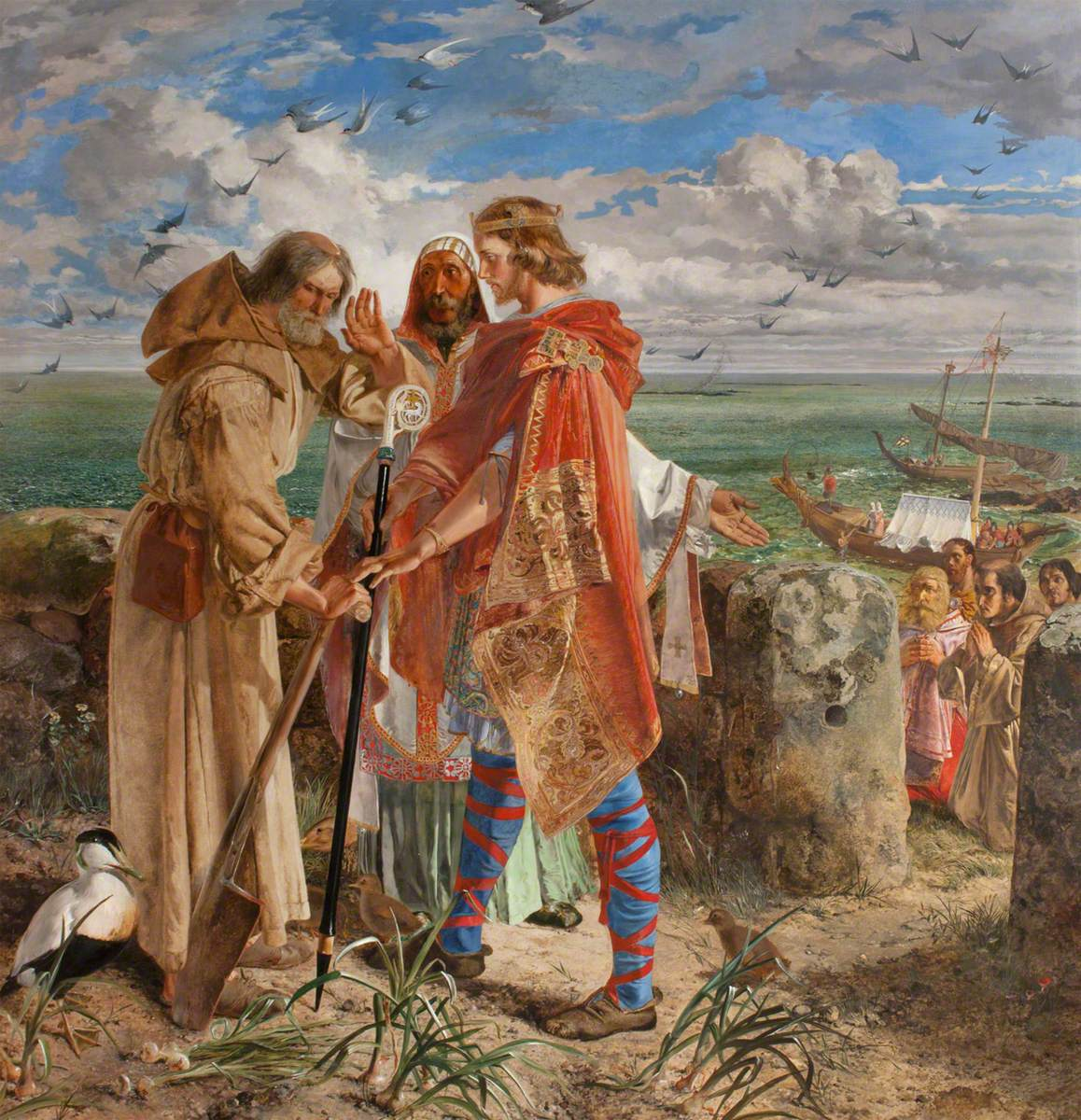
In this 1856 painting King Egfrid and Bishop Trumwine Persuade Cuthbert to Be Made Bishop by William Bell Scott, George Cooper Abbs II agreed to be the model for Cuthbert (left), provided the likeness was not good.

Shortly after Abbs died in 1878, Robert Eli Hooppell wrote of his "somewhat eccentric exterior", and also of his good character and passion as a naturalist. James Walker Kirkby named a fossil fish Palaeoniscum abbsii for him, specimens being found in Fulwell quarry. (It was later placed in Acentrophorus by Ramsay Traquair.)
