= Brockley Whins =

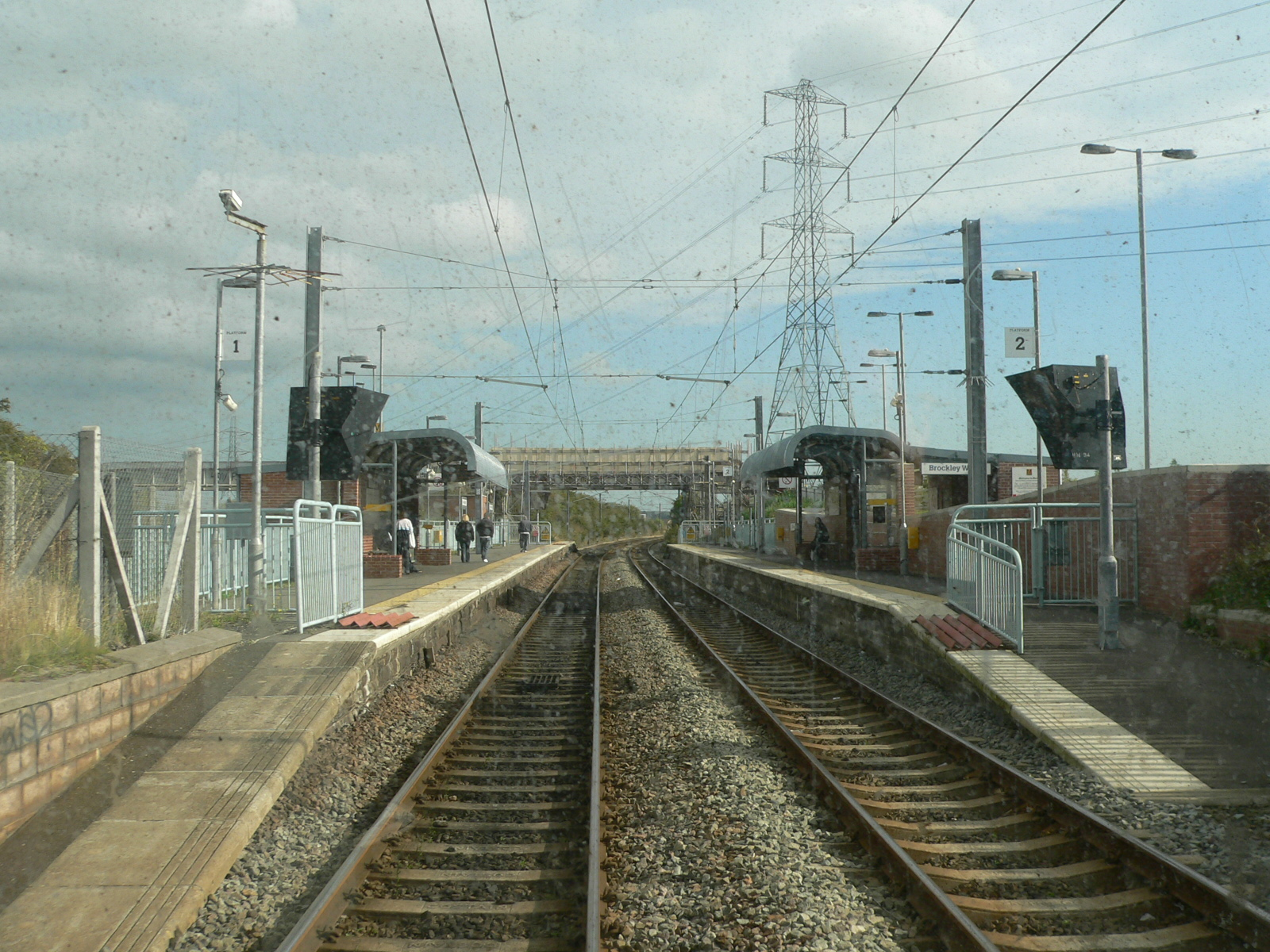
- Brockley Whins Metro station

- Location in Tyne and Wear
- Coordinates: 54.959509°N 1.460857°W
- OS grid reference: NZ345628
- Sovereign state: United Kingdom
- Country: England
- District: Tyne and Wear

Brockley Whins is an area in South Tyneside, part of South Shields, with a postcode of NE32 [1]

It is served by Brockley Whins Metro station.

When the Brandling Junction Railway (now the Newcastle-Sunderland metro line) was built (1839) it crossed the Stanhope and Tyne railway nearby. Sidings were put in place to connect the two railways together, and a station was placed there, named after the farm because it was the nearest habitation at that time. The modern estate was apparently named after the station.
