= Broccoli (magazine) =

- Categories: Cannabis, Art, Fashion
- Founder: Anja Charbonneau
- Country: USA
- Based in: Portland, Oregon
- Website: www.broccolimag.com

Broccoli is an independent print magazine created by and for women who use cannabis. It is based in Portland, Oregon.

Although intended for cannabis users, Broccoli is an art and lifestyle magazine that bills itself as "playful, informed, eclectic, and thoughtful".

After the passage of the 2018 United States farm bill, Broccoli was the first organization to put cannabis in MoMA.

== Origins ==
The magazine was founded by the former creative director of Kinfolk. It was launched in November 2017.

== See also ==
- High Times
