= Shaun Reay =

English footballer (born 1989)

Personal information
- Date of birth: 20 May 1989 (age 37)
- Place of birth: Boldon Colliery, England
- Height: 6 ft 1 in (1.85 m)
- Position: Forward

Team information
- Current team: Darlington

Senior career*
Years	Team	Apps	(Gls)
2005–2008	Darlington	4	(1)
2008	Harrogate Town	8	(0)
2008–2009	Blyth Spartans	37	(12)
2009–2009	Shildon	7	(2)
2009–2009	Whitby Town	3	(0)
2009–2010	Jarrow Roofing BCA	16	(10)
2010–2010	Bedlington Terriers	7	(1)
2010–2012	Boldon Community Association	54	(52)
2012–	Darlington	14	(22)
- * Club domestic league appearances and goals as of 21:15, 13 May 2011 (UTC)

Shaun Reay (born 20 May 1989) is an English footballer who played as a forward in the Football League for Darlington.

== Early life ==
Born in Boldon Colliery, Tyne and Wear, Reay attended Boldon School from 2000 to 2005. In 2008, he enrolled on a three-year Association of Accounting Technicians course at South Tyneside College.

Reay's involvement in junior football included spells at Boldon Colts and Redheugh Boys. Redheugh have produced notable footballers including Paul Gascoigne and Don Hutchison. He cites his favourite moment at Redheugh as scoring the winning goal in the final of the Sage Tournament at Durham in 2004 against Redby Town. This was his last touch of the ball for the club before signing for Darlington. Reay has some advice for Redheugh's up-and-coming players: "Keep trying and never give up. Winners never quit and quitters never win, this club is the best it gets". He scored a number of goals for Redheugh including a hat-trick against Leam Rangers and two against South Moor. These goalscoring exploits set Reay on the way to signing for Darlington.

As well as his footballing exploits he also represented his school in the South Tyneside Schools Cross Country Championships, finishing in fourth place.

== Career ==
=== Darlington ===
Reay started his career with Darlington on a YTS contract and impressed so much so that he was given his first professional contract on 13 October 2006, an 18-month contract which would expire at the end of the 2007–08 season. Darlington's youth development director Mick Tait described him as "a lively striker who has been causing defenders all sorts of problems with his movement and pace". Reay was given squad number 24 for the 2007–08 season. Whilst at Darlington Reay studied for a BTEC in Sports Science at East Durham & Houghall Community College in Peterlee, and was nominated for a Learning and Skills Council award by his club for continuing his studies at the same time that his football career was starting. He was also involved in a local road safety initiative, supported by Darlington F.C.

Although Reay played at junior and reserve level, he made only four appearances for Darlington's first team. In the 2006–07 season he started one game and came on as a substitute twice, and the following season made only one substitute appearance. On 22 May 2008, Reay was released from his Darlington contract by manager Dave Penney. On 11 July 2008, after being released by the club a few weeks earlier, manager Penney announced that the club had in fact retained the young striker and handed him another chance, with the intention of sending him out on loan to gain experience.

=== Harrogate Town ===
Reay signed for Conference North club Harrogate Town on loan for the 2008–09 season. Whilst with the CNG Stadium club he made eight appearances, starting one game and coming on as a substitute in the other seven. In part due to his limited opportunities with Harrogate Town, he left the club to join fellow Conference North side Blyth Spartans.

=== Blyth Spartans ===
Blyth Spartans signed Reay on 22 October 2008 on a two-year contract, after becoming frustrated at the lack of first-team opportunities at Darlington. On 25 October, in a Fourth Qualifying Round tie in the FA Cup against Sheffield F.C., Reay came off the substitutes' bench at half time to make his debut with Blyth 1–0 down. He made a big impact, setting up the equaliser and then putting Blyth 2–1 up with an instinctive first time angled drive. Blyth went on to win the tie 3–1, and Reay's cameo earned him the Man of the Match award. He was also nominated as the FA's player of the round for his performance. In the First Round Proper of the FA Cup, Reay scored twice as Blyth upset League Two side Shrewsbury Town 3–1, the first coming after just 31 seconds. This performance again earned him a nomination for the FA's player of the round.

At the end of the 2008–09 season, his first season with Spartans, Reay had made 36 appearances, starting 27, and scored 12 goals. He was rewarded for his efforts with the Young Player of The Season Award.

=== Shildon ===
Shildon signed Reay on 4 September 2009, with Blyth Spartans retaining his Conference North registration for the season. Reay made his debut for Shildon on 5 September in a home game against Consett. Shildon lost the game 2–1, but after the match manager Gary Forest promised supporters that Reay would score goals.

=== Whitby Town ===
In October 2009 he signed for Unibond Premier Division side Whitby Town. Reay made his Whitby debut on 31 October 2009 against King's Lynn in a 2–0 defeat in the 2nd Qualifying Round of the FA Trophy. After struggling to fit into the side Reay's time at The Turnbull Ground turned out to be a short one and he was released by mutual consent.

=== Jarrow Roofing ===
After leaving Whitby, Reay began training with Jarrow Roofing, and signed for the club on Christmas Eve 2009. His debut was on 23 January 2010 in the Northern League Second Division match at home to Birtley Town, which Jarrow Roofing won 2–1, Reay making an assist for the winning goal. Reay's first goals for the club came in a 5–0 win away to Crook Town on 13 February, Reay netting a hat-trick. Jarrow Roofing were promoted to the Northern League First Division at the end of the season, finishing in third place.

=== Bedlington Terriers ===
On 2 June 2010, Reay signed forms with Bedlington Terriers. Reay scored two goals in three pre-season outings but was used primarily as a substitute following the arrival of Alex Benjamin at the start of the season and Wayne Gredziak into the season. To date Reay has started one competitive game and come on as a substitute in six other games. He netted his first goal against Ryton.

=== Boldon Community Association ===
After Reay was made available for transfer in October 2010 he signed for Boldon Community Association where his father and uncle had recently taken over. In a struggling side in the 2010–11 season, although Reay missed the start of the season with Boldon he made 29 appearances (27 in the league) and netted 26 times (24 in league), giving him a goals per game ratio of 0.9. Reay was voted man of the match five times and, although he missed the first 11 league games, finished third in the Top Goalscorer list.

=== Darlington ===
In June 2012 he rejoined Darlington.
