= The Boldons =

Area in Tyne & Wear, England

Coordinates: 54.945°N 1.441°W

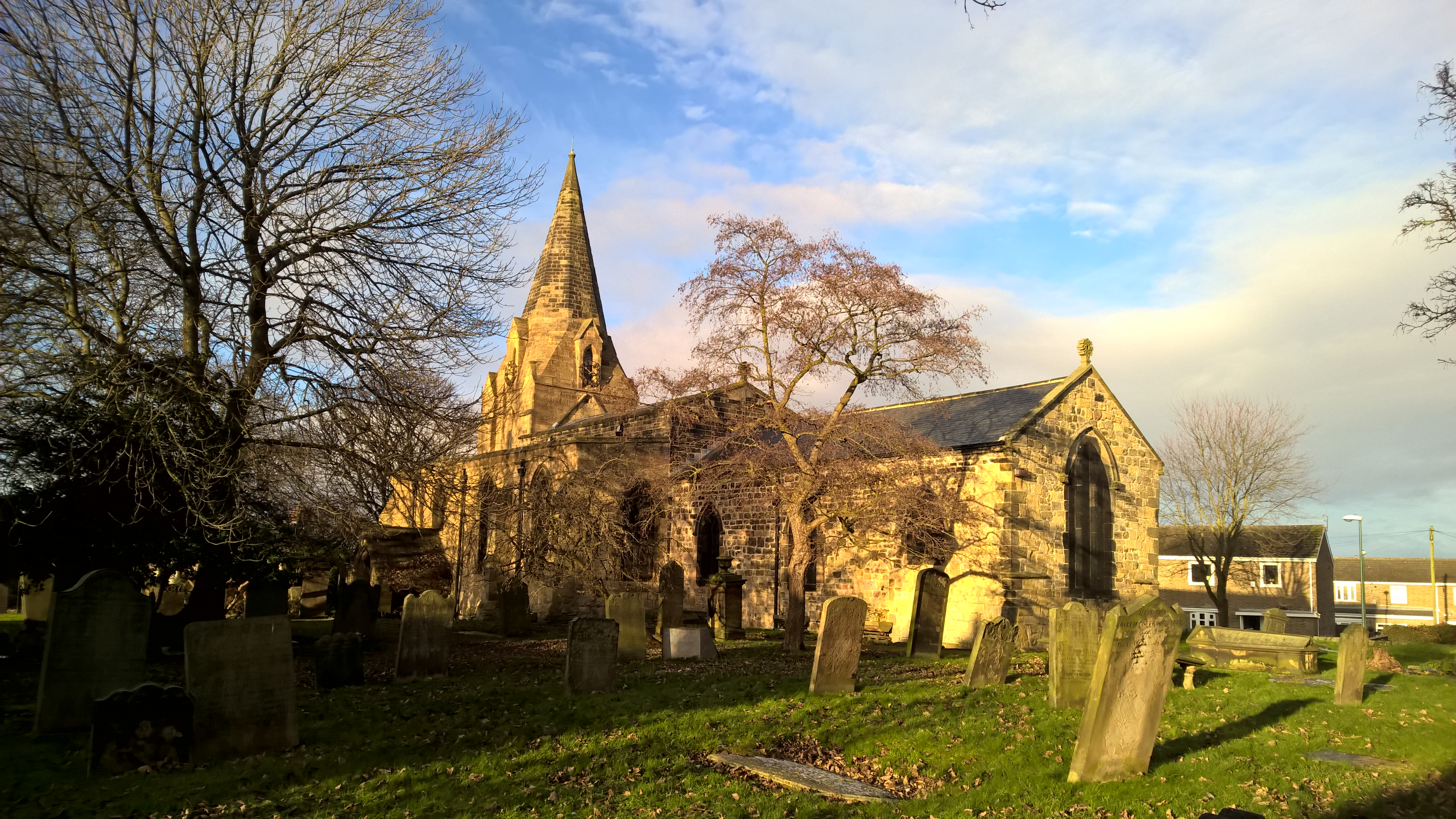
- Parts of Boldon Parish Church date from AD 920

- Location within Tyne and Wear
- Population: 13,271 (2001)
- OS grid reference: NZ361615
- Metropolitan borough: South Tyneside
- Metropolitan county: Tyne and Wear
- Region: North East
- Country: England
- Sovereign state: United Kingdom
- Post town: BOLDON COLLIERY
- Postcode district: NE35
- Post town: EAST BOLDON
- Postcode district: NE36
- Dialling code: 0191
- Police: Northumbria
- Fire: Tyne and Wear
- Ambulance: North East
- UK Parliament: Jarrow and Gateshead East; South Shields

The Boldons is an area made up of the three villages of East Boldon, West Boldon and Boldon Colliery in South Tyneside, in the county of Tyne and Wear, England. In 2001, they had a population of 13,271.

== History ==
Lying within the historic boundaries of County Durham, the villages are first recorded in print in 1170. Their names evolved from the words "Bold" or "Botl", meaning a building, and "dun", meaning a type of hillfort.

In 1866, work began sinking a pit that began producing coal in 1869; it was then known as Boldon New Winning. The village that developed nearby in the 1870s became known as Boldon Colliery. When the mine was deepened and extended in the 1910s, further housing to accommodate the workforce was built to the south of the pit in an area known as Boldon New Town.

Until 1974, the area was administered as an urban district of County Durham, but since then has been part of the borough of South Tyneside.

In 1976, the Boldon Colliery Band appeared in episode 13 of the television series When the Boat Comes In. The mine closed in 1982, but more jobs became available when an Asda supermarket opened in 1987. Recent developments include Boldon Business Park. Boldon Colliery also has its own multi-screen cinema operated by Cineworld. The main secondary school in the area is Boldon School, a specialist sports college.

== Governance ==
East Boldon and Cleadon was previously the only ward in South Tyneside to elect three Conservative councillors. However, in the 2011 local elections, Labour candidate Joan Atkinson unseated the sitting Conservative councillor, reducing the number of Conservatives on South Tyneside Council to one. Boldon Colliery usually elects three Labour councillors. As of March 2021, these two wards have five Labour councillors and one Independent Conservative.

The Boldons are within the Jarrow constituency, which also includes Jarrow, Hebburn and parts of east Gateshead. The local MP is Kate Osborne of the Labour Party, who succeeded the previous Labour incumbent.

In the earlier part of the 20th century, a famous son of the community was the Labour politician Jack Lawson. He represented Chester-le-Street in County Durham as an MP and was later elevated to the House of Lords.

== Housing and environment ==
The Boldons form part of the suburban fringe of South Tyneside and are completely surrounded by green belt.

There are conservation areas within the historic village centres of East and West Boldon. East Boldon is served by its own Metro station, providing residents with easy access to Newcastle Airport, Sunderland, and Newcastle Central, making it a sought-after home for commuters.

The three schools are very much sought after; they provide nursery, infants (East Boldon Infant School) and juniors (East Boldon Junior School), which work together via the PTA. The Friends of East Boldon Parks hold annual community events, such as Party in the Park and Halloween trails. The East Boldon Scouts is one of the largest in the UK with over 200 attendees. House prices are higher than the national average, due to gentrification.

Despite the relatively small geographical area, there are a significant number of older buildings considered as being of architectural merit including churches, public houses and former country houses, as well as modern additions. St. Nicholas' Church in West Boldon is a Grade I listed building; much of the stonework dates from the thirteenth century, but the foundation of the building dates from the Saxon period.

The area includes a wide range of housing styles, from Edwardian villas to Victorian terraces, post-war housing to more recent smaller-scale developments. The first street built in Boldon Colliery was Cross Row (also known as Sinkers Row) which was constructed to house the men who were initially employed to sink the shaft. Several years later, other major housing projects were started and terraced housing such as that at Arnold Street and Charles Street were built.

After the colliery was closed, the former industrial land lay derelict for many years. In 2000, Colliery Wood was created with over 2,500 trees planted; it is popular with the local community and provides a habitat for animals such as pheasants, squirrels, woodpeckers and otters. Colliery Wood provides six new paths, which are also suitable for cycling and link to East Boldon, and Brockley Whins and Whiteleas in nearby South Shields.

Boldon Flats is another site important for nature conservation, which contains an area of damp pasture. The flats are flooded from each October to March, attracting a wide array of bird life and a large population of common frogs.

West Boldon Lodge, constructed by the National Grid, is situated amongst a range of habitats, including wetland, grassland and woodland. Locally rare orchids are present at one site.

The River Don traverses Boldon and is the last stronghold of water voles in South Tyneside.

== Transport ==
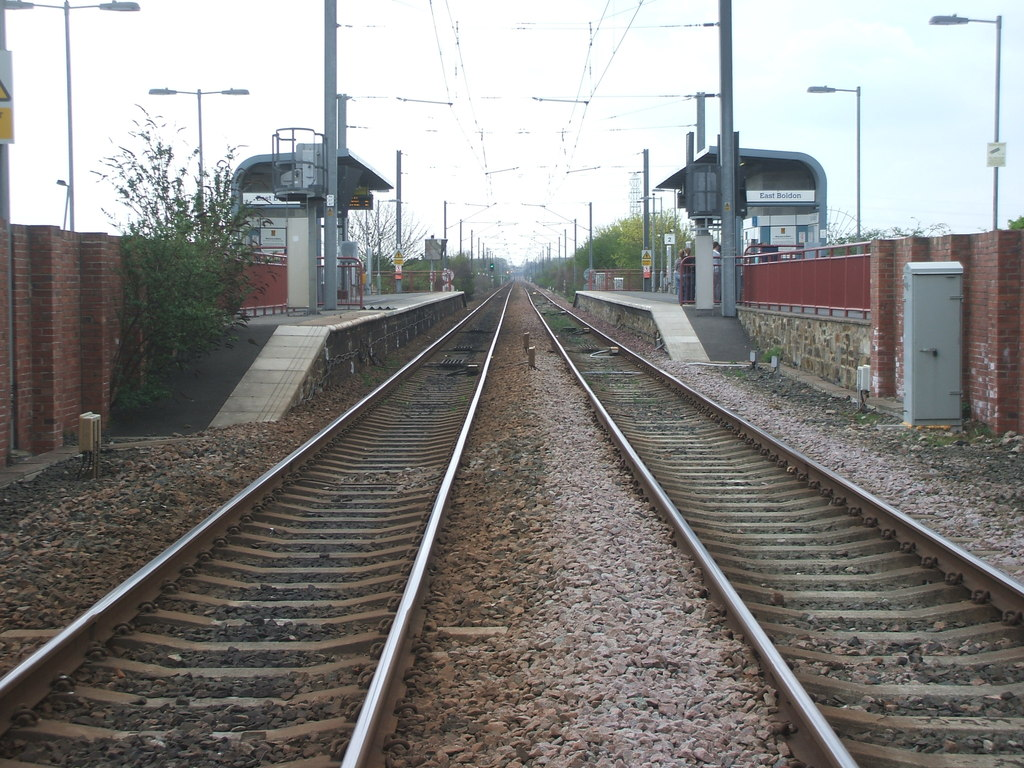
East Boldon metro station

Brockley Whins and East Boldon are neighbouring stops on the Tyne and Wear Metro system. The Green line serves stations between South Hylton, Sunderland, Gateshead, Newcastle Central and Newcastle Airport.

The nearest National Rail stations are at Heworth and Sunderland, which are stops on the Durham Coast Line between Newcastle, Hartlepool and Middlesbrough; services are operated by Northern Trains.

Bus services are provided predominantly by Stagecoach North East; routes link the area to South Shields, Cleadon, Heworth, Gateshead and Newcastle.

== Sport ==
Boldon has produced many notable sports personalities, among them former Newcastle United footballer Wes Saunders. Charlton Athletic goalkeeper Sam Bartram, their record appearance holder, who played 800 games for the London club, was signed from Boldon Villa in September 1934 and played in four successive Wembley cup finals from 1944 to 1947. Full back Jack Shreeve moved from the Villa to Charlton in 1935, and was a colleague of Bartram's in their 1947 FA Cup winning team. A Sam Bartram Memorial Cup competition was introduced at Boldon in February 2008, aimed at inspiring current footballing youngsters in the Boldon area.

Other notable sportsmen from Boldon are cricketers Simon Brown and current England rugby youth player Robert Bell, Darlington striker Shaun Reay and Spennymoor Town midfielder Jamie Chandler.

There are private tennis and golf clubs at Dipe Lane, as well as other pursuits on offer within local schools, community centres and parks.

The Jarrow Roofing Boldon Community Association F.C. was founded in 1987 and played at The Boldon C.A. Sports Ground.

== Notable people ==
- Denise Robertson (1932–2016), television agony aunt on This Morning, who regularly appeared on the show from its inception in 1988 until shortly before her death in 2016, lived in East Boldon.
- Daniel James Smith (1864–1911), miner who could reportedly lift two stones, each weighing upwards of 43 kilograms, one in each hand. He lived in West Boldon all his life until a mining accident in 1911 - injuring him badly, leading to his death two weeks later. There is a memorial of Smith in the back of Boldon Parish Church.

== See also ==
- Boldon Book
