= Fellgate Metro station =

Tyne and Wear Metro station in South Tyneside

Fellgate
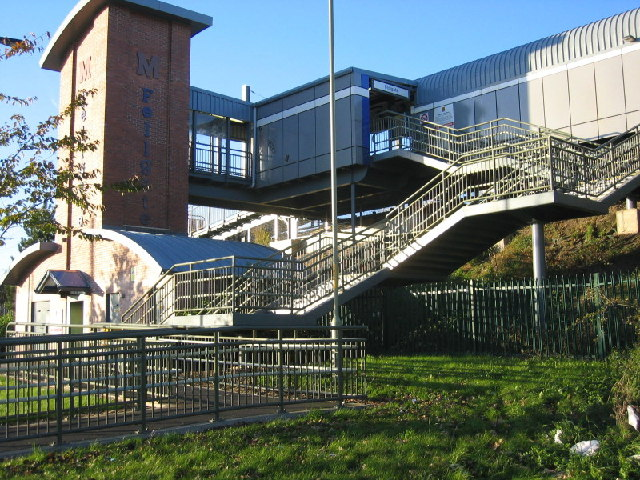

General information
- Location: Fellgate, South Tyneside; England
- Coordinates: 54°57′27″N 1°29′07″W
- Grid reference: NZ330625
- System: Tyne and Wear Metro station
- Transit authority: Tyne and Wear PTE
- Platforms: 2
- Tracks: 2

Construction
- Parking: 54 spaces
- Cycle facilities: 5 cycle pods
- Accessible: Step-free access to platform

Other information
- Station code: FEG
- Fare zone: B

History
- Original company: Tyne and Wear Metro

Key dates
- 31 March 2002: Opened

Passengers
- 2024/25: 0.769 million

Services
Preceding station	Tyne and Wear Metro	Following station
Brockley Whins towards South Hylton	Green line	Pelaw towards Airport
Location
- Location within Tyne and Wear

Fellgate is a Tyne and Wear Metro station, serving the suburbs of Fellgate and Hedworth, South Tyneside in Tyne and Wear, England. It joined the network on 31 March 2002, following the opening of the extension from Pelaw to South Hylton.

== History ==
Along with other stations on the line between Fellgate and South Hylton, the station is fitted with vitreous enamel panels designed by artist, Morag Morrison. Each station uses a different arrangement of colours, with strong colours used in platform shelters and ticketing areas, and a more neutral palate for external elements.

The station was used by 380,620 passengers in 2017–18, making it the fourth-most-used station on the Wearside extension, after Pelaw (1,092,716), Sunderland (772,975) and Park Lane (392,327).

== Facilities ==
Step-free access is available at all stations across the Tyne and Wear Metro network, with lifts providing step-free access to platforms at Fellgate. The station is also equipped with ticket machines, waiting shelter, seating, next train information displays, timetable posters, and an emergency help point on both platforms. Ticket machines are able to accept payment with credit and debit card (including contactless payment), notes and coins. The station is also fitted with smartcard validators, which feature at all stations across the network.

There is a free car park available, with 54 parking spaces, plus three accessible spaces, as well as a taxi rank. There is also the provision for cycle parking, with five cycle pods available for use.

== Services ==
As of April 2021, the station is served by up to five trains per hour on weekdays and Saturday, and up to four trains per hour during the evening and on Sunday.
