= Ogle =

Ogle may refer to:

== Places ==
- Ogle County, Illinois, United States
- Original name of Ashton, Illinois, a village
- Ogle, Kentucky, United States, an unincorporated community
- Ogle Township, Somerset County, Pennsylvania, United States
- Ogle, Northumberland, England, a village
- Ogle Castle in Northumberland, England
- Glen Ogle, Scotland

== People ==
- Ogle (surname)
- Ogle family of Northumberland, England
- Ogle Marbury (1882–1955), American jurist and politician, Chief Judge of the supreme court of Maryland
- Ogle Moore (1801–1874), Irish Anglican priest

== Titles ==
- Baron Ogle
- Earl of Ogle

== Other uses ==
- Ogle Airport, near Georgetown, Guyana
- Ogle Design, a British design consultancy and onetime car maker
- OGLE, the Optical Gravitational Lensing Experiment survey
- Ogle DVD Player, open source software DVD player for Unix-like operating systems
- Ogle app, a smartphone-based social media application
