= Robert de Ogle =

English soldier (c. 1305–1362)

Early Ogle arms: Argent, a fess between three crescents gules.

Sir Robert de Ogle (Note: The Christian name is sometimes given in the Latin form, Robertus. The surname is sometimes spelt Ogill or Oggill.) (c. 1305–1362) was an English soldier and feudal landowner in Northumbria who fought in the border conflicts with Scotland. He captured five Scottish knights near Newcastle in 1341 and was licensed to crenellate Ogle House. He distinguished himself in resisting the foray into Cumberland of Sir William Douglas in 1345, fought at Neville's Cross in 1346 and took three nobles prisoner, and held Berwick Castle against the Scots in 1355.

== Life ==
Robert de Ogle was head of a Northumberland family long settled at Ogle in the parish of Whalton, 8 miles (13 km) south-west of Morpeth. The family rose to importance in consequence of the border warfare with Scotland. When David Bruce penetrated as far as Newcastle in August 1341, Ogle distinguished himself by effecting the capture of five Scottish knights, and in the same year Edward III gave him permission to castellate his manor house at Ogle, together with the privilege of free warren on his demesne lands. Some remains of Ogle Castle, which was surrounded by two moats, are still to be seen. Ogle shared with John de Kirkby, Bishop of Carlisle, the honours of the resistance to the Scottish foray into Cumberland in 1345, when Sir William Douglas, the Knight of Liddesdale, burnt Carlisle and Penrith. In a skirmish with a detachment of the invaders, in which the Bishop was unhorsed, Ogle ran the Scottish leader Alexander Stragan (Strachan) through the body with his lance, but was himself severely wounded. He fought at the Battle of Neville's Cross, or Durham, as it was officially called, on 17 October 1346, and took three prisoners—the Earl of Fife, Henry de Ramsay, and Thomas Boyd. There is a tradition that the captive King David was taken in the first place to Ogle Castle.

Ogle was in command at Berwick as lieutenant of William, Lord Greystock, who was with the King in France, when the Scots took the town by surprise on the night of 6 November 1355. He made a staunch resistance, in which two of his sons fell, and succeeded in holding the castle till help came. Greystock was condemned to forfeiture of life and property, but was afterwards pardoned on pleading that he had the King's orders to go to France.

== Legacy ==
Ogle died in 1362. His son Robert, who predeceased him, married Ellen, only child and heiress of Sir Robert Bertram of Bothal, three miles east of Morpeth, who in 1343 obtained a licence to build the castle there. A splendid gatehouse, adorned with contemporary shields of arms, still remains. Their son Robert, who succeeded his grandfather, was under age, and John Philipot became his guardian. Bothal Castle came to him on the death of his mother's third husband, David Holgrave, in 1405 or 1406, and he immediately settled it upon his younger son, John, who had taken his grandmother's surname of Bertram. But the day after Ogle's death on 31 October 1409, his elder son, Sir Robert, laid siege to it, and drove out his brother. Bertram brought the matter before parliament, and the castle remained in his family until it became extinct in the direct male line. This was before 1517, when the 4th Lord Ogle styled himself 'Lord of Ogle and Bottell'. Robert, 1st Lord Ogle, however, seems to have been at least temporarily in possession in October 1465.

== Gallery ==
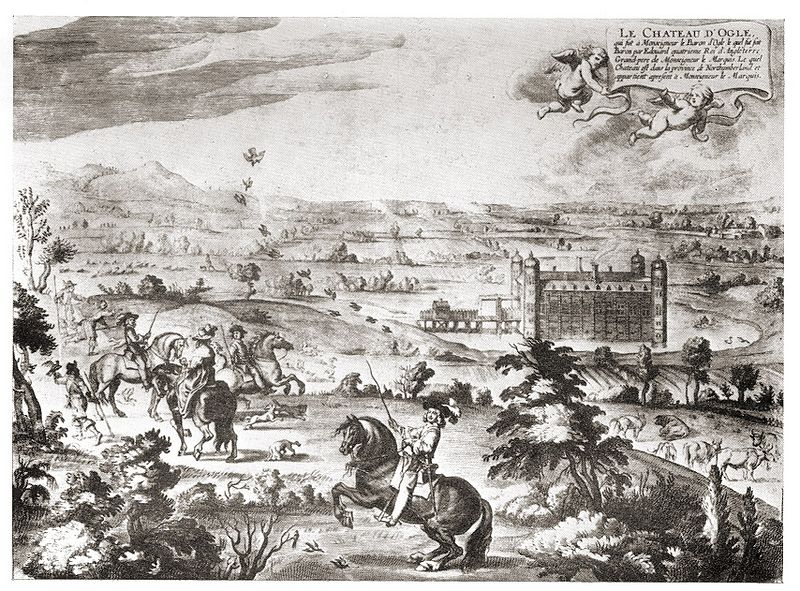
View of Ogle Castle, 17th century

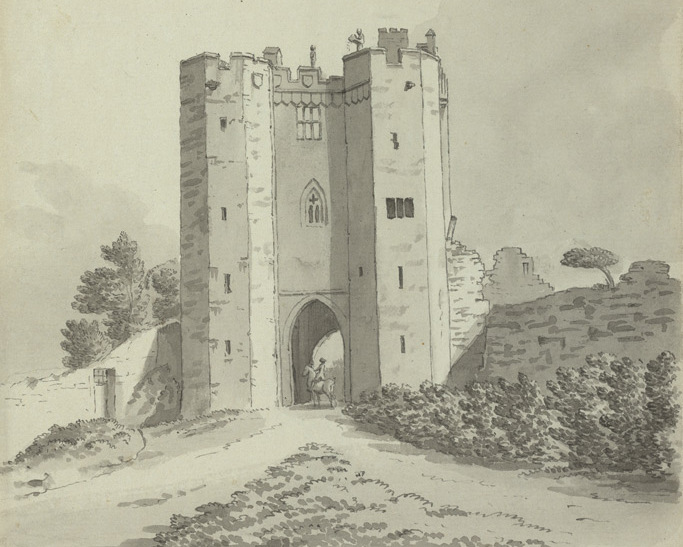
View of Bothal Castle, 18th century

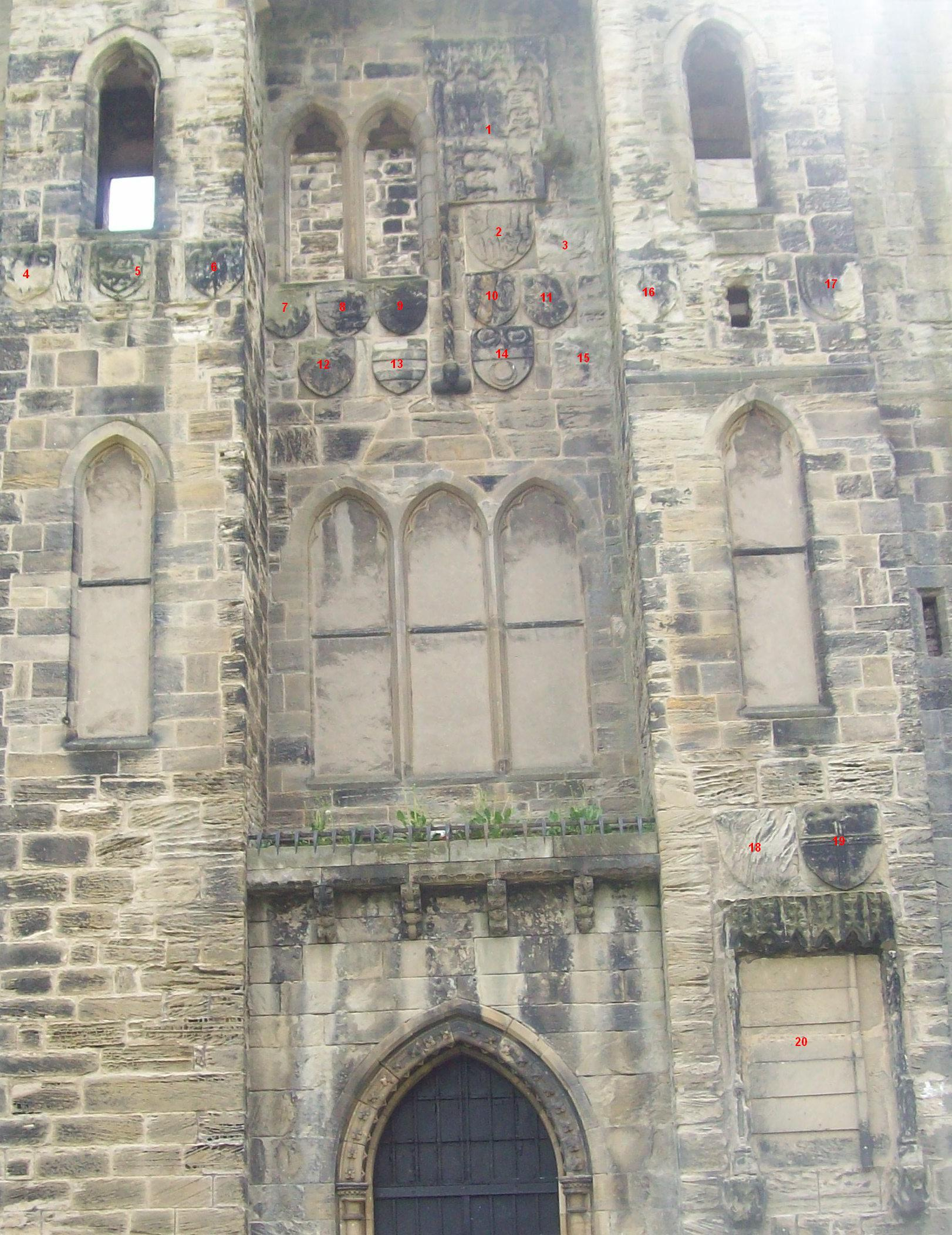
West façade of Hylton Castle, 2008

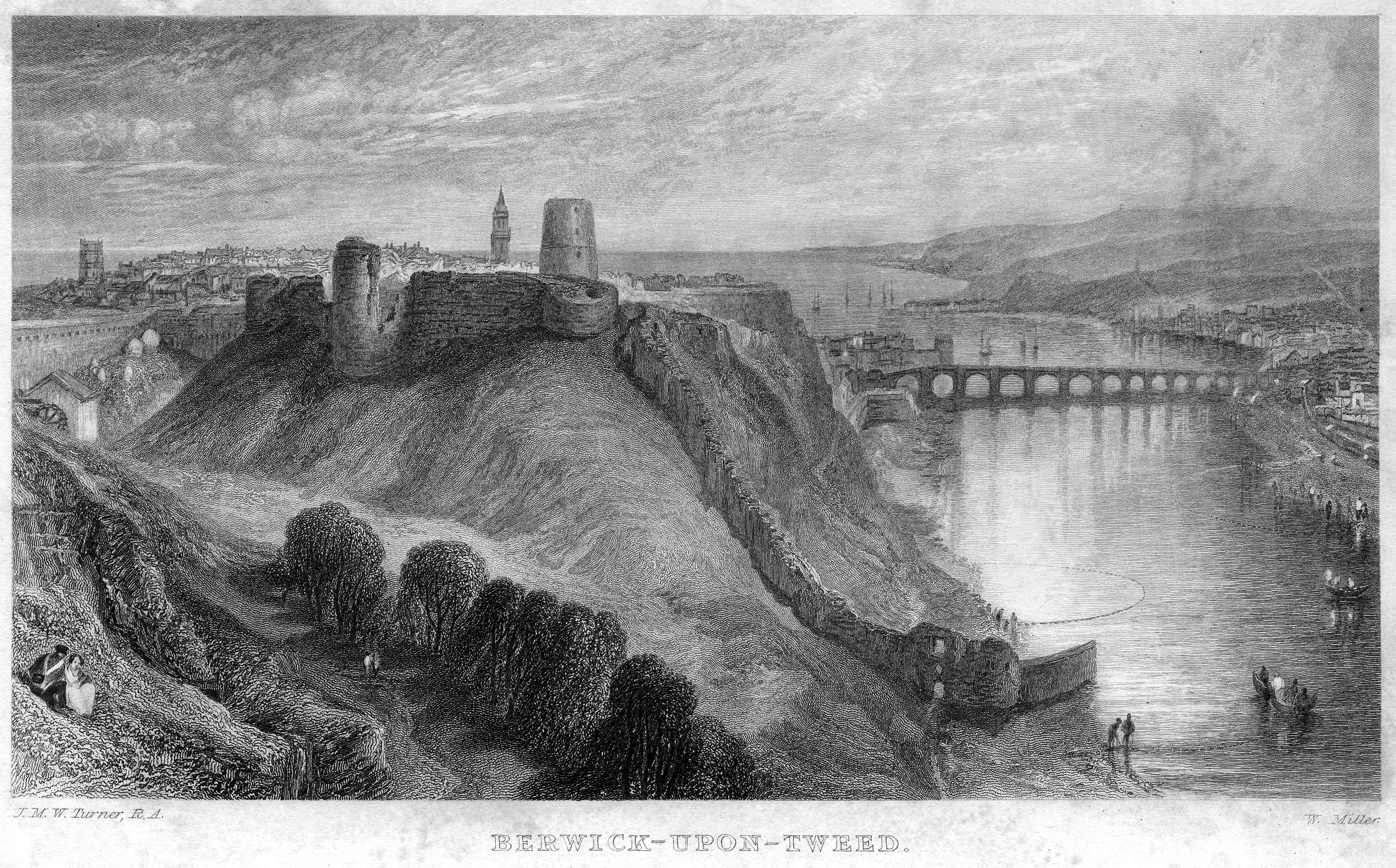
View of Berwick Castle, 1833

== See also ==
- Ogle family
- Baron Ogle
- Second War of Scottish Independence
- List of battles between England and Scotland
