= Ogle (surname) =

Ogle is an English surname. Notable people with the surname include:

- Ahmed Abdi Ogle, Kenyan politician elected to the Kenyan Parliament in 1963, 1974 and 1983
- Alexander Ogle (1766–1832), American politician, father of Charles Ogle (politician) and grandfather of Andrew Jackson Ogle
- Andrew J. Ogle (1822–1852), American politician
- Benjamin Ogle (1749–1809), Governor of Maryland from 1798 to 1801
- Brett Ogle (born 1964), Australian professional golfer
- Catherine Ogle (born 1961), British Anglican priest, Dean of Winchester
- Chaloner Ogle (1681–1750), British admiral
- Sir Chaloner Ogle, 1st Baronet (1726–1816), British admiral
- Sir Charles Ogle, 2nd Baronet (1775–1858), British Admiral of the Fleet
- Charles Ogle (politician) (1798–1841), US Congressman
- Charles Chaloner Ogle (1851–1871), British journalist
- Charles Stanton Ogle (1865–1940), American silent film actor
- Charles Clifford Ogle (1923–c. 1964?), American businessman and aviator who disappeared
- Charles Ogle (racing driver) (1941–1985), American physician, businessman and NASCAR driver
- Dan C. Ogle (1901–1990), American major general and third Surgeon General of the United States Air Force
- David Ogle (1922–1962), British industrial and car designer
- Diane Ogle (born 1965), Australian luger
- George Ogle (translator) (1704–1746), English author and translator
- George Ogle (1742–1814), Irish politician
- John William Ogle (1824–1905), British medical doctor
- June Ogle (born 1986), Guyanese cricketer
- Kenneth N. Ogle (1902–1968), American scientist of human vision
- Natalie Ogle (born 1960), English actress
- Ponsonby Ogle (1855–1902), British writer and journalist
- Ralph Ogle, 3rd Baron Ogle (1468–1512)
- Rex Ogle, American author
- Robert Ogle, 1st Baron Ogle (1406–1469)
- Robert Ogle (1928–1998), Canadian Catholic priest and politician
- Samuel Ogle (c. 1694–1752), three times Provincial Governor of Maryland
- Thomas Ogle, English soldier and royalist plotter in 1643
- William Ogle, 1st Viscount Ogle (died 1670), English soldier and politician

== See also ==
- Ogle family
