= Admiral Ogle =

Admiral Ogle may refer to:

- Chaloner Ogle (1681–1750), British Royal Navy admiral
- Sir Chaloner Ogle, 1st Baronet (1726–1816), British Royal Navy admiral
- Sir Charles Ogle, 2nd Baronet (1775–1858), British Royal Navy admiral
