= Robert Ogle (disambiguation) =

Robert Ogle (1928–1998) was a Canadian priest, broadcaster and politician.

Robert Ogle may also refer to:

- Robert de Ogle (c. 1305–1362), English feudal lord
- Robert Ogle, 1st Baron Ogle (1406–1469), English feudal lord
- Sir Robert Ogle (MP) (died 1436), English landowner, Member of Parliament and administrator
- Bob Ogle (1926–1984), American voice actor, animator and writer
