= Ogle family =

Landed gentry in Northumberland, England

Ogle Medieval coat of arms

The Ogle family was a prominent landed gentry in Northumberland, England. The earliest appearances of the family name were written Hoggel, Oggehill, Ogille, and Oghill.

== Origins ==
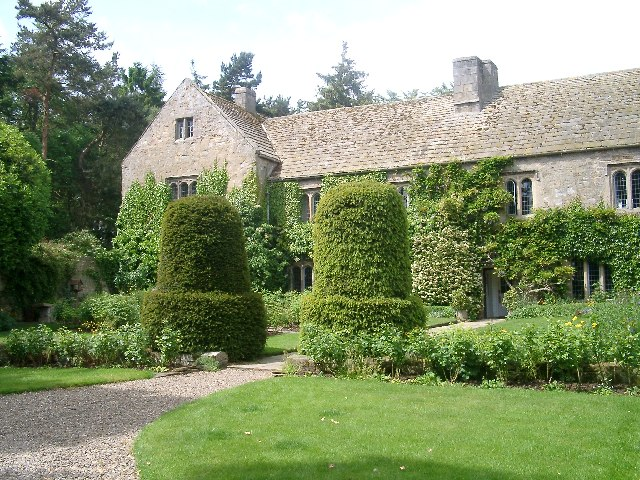
Ogle Castle

The ancient family seat was 2,111-acre (8.54 km^{2}) (as at 1870) Ogle, Northumberland, near Whalton. There, Robert Ogle had the family's manor house licensed for crenellation in 1341, or the previous year.

== Ogle Barony ==
Sir Robert Ogle, Knight (24 Dec 1372–12 Aug 1436), was the son of Sir Robert "Richard" Ogle, Baron of Hepple, Knight, of Ogle and Bothal Castles. In 1407, he was Constable of Norham Castle and Sheriff and Escheator of Norhamshire (an exclave of County Durham) and Islandshire (an exclave of County Palatinate of Durham) in the north of England. He represented Northumberland in Parliament six times between 1416 and 1435. In 1417 he was High Sheriff of Northumberland, and was appointed Warden of Roxburgh Castle in 1425.

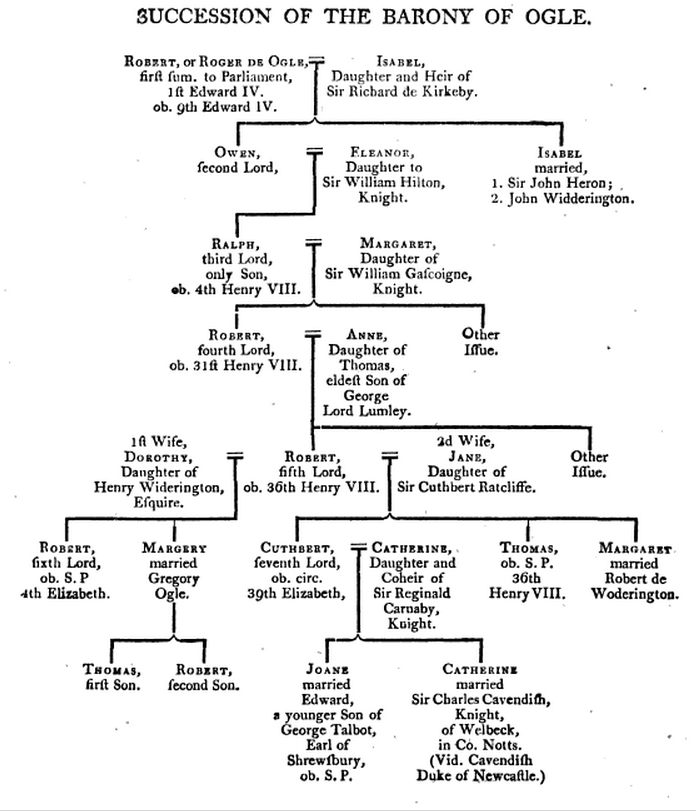
Pedigree: Barons of Ogle

He was also a key figure in the 15th century defence of the northern border against the Scots, but was beaten by Sir Alexander Ramsay at Piperden in 1436.

Sir Robert married Matilda "Maud" Grey on c. 21 May 1399, the only daughter of Thomas IV Grey, Constable of Norham (1359–1400) and Joan de Mowbray, and sister of John Grey, 1st Earl of Tankerville, and Thomas Grey (1384–1415). Many of the extended family were involved in the Wars of the Roses on the Yorkist side.

As father of Robert Ogle, 1st Baron Ogle, Robert was the head of the family that included seven successive barons and many later junior branches. Catherine Ogle was the last of this main line. As the only surviving heir of Cuthbert Ogle, 7th Baron Ogle (d. 1597), she was created Baroness Ogle in 1628. In 1591 she married Sir Charles Cavendish of Welbeck. They are the parents of William Cavendish, 1st Duke of Newcastle, and Earl of Ogle.

== Ogle of Causey Park ==
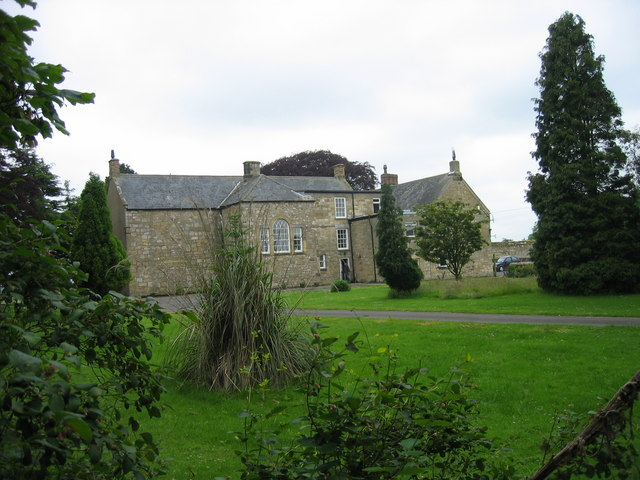
Causey Park House

The manor of Causey Park was acquired with Bothal Castle, as a result of heiress Helen Bertram's first marriage to Robert Ogle, knight (d. 1363).

William's great-grandson James (1634–1664) married Jane Ogle of Burradon. As cousins, this marriage merged these two family branches. His son William Ogle (1653–1718) was Member of Parliament for Northumberland from 1685 to 1689.

== Ogle of Choppington and Burradon ==
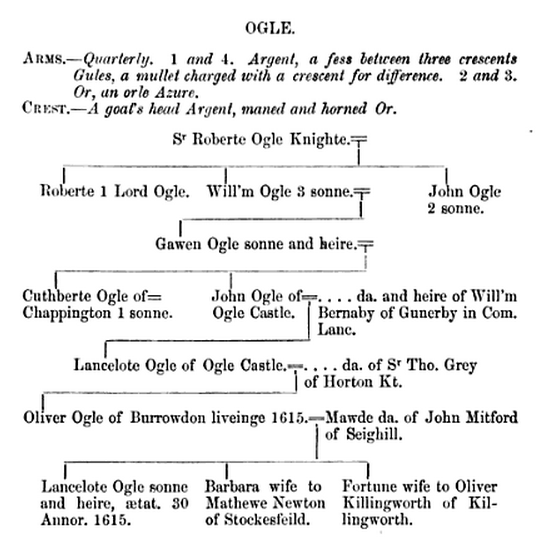
Pedigree of William Ogle of Choppington

Sir William Ogle of Choppington (1412 – 10 August 1474), was the third son of Maud Grey and younger brother of the first baron. He is also the ancestor of the American Ogle family from Colonial Maryland. His son and heir was Gawen Ogle. Around 1503, Gawen built a tower house at Choppington, then Bedlingtonshire (Northumberland), of which no present trace remains.

In 1569 and 1596, Gawen's grandson Oliver (d. 1616) acquired the Burradon manor near Longbenton, including a tower house in two tranches. In 1633, Oliver's son Lancelot Ogle (1582–1640), improved the accommodation at Burradon Tower. After his daughter Jane Ogle of Burradon, married her cousin James Ogle of Causey Park, the Burradon house was abandoned. By 1769 it was reported to be in ruins. William Wallace, Jane's grandson, inherited the estate. He changed his name to William Wallis Ogle, and sold the property outside of the family in 1857.

== Ogle of Kirkley ==
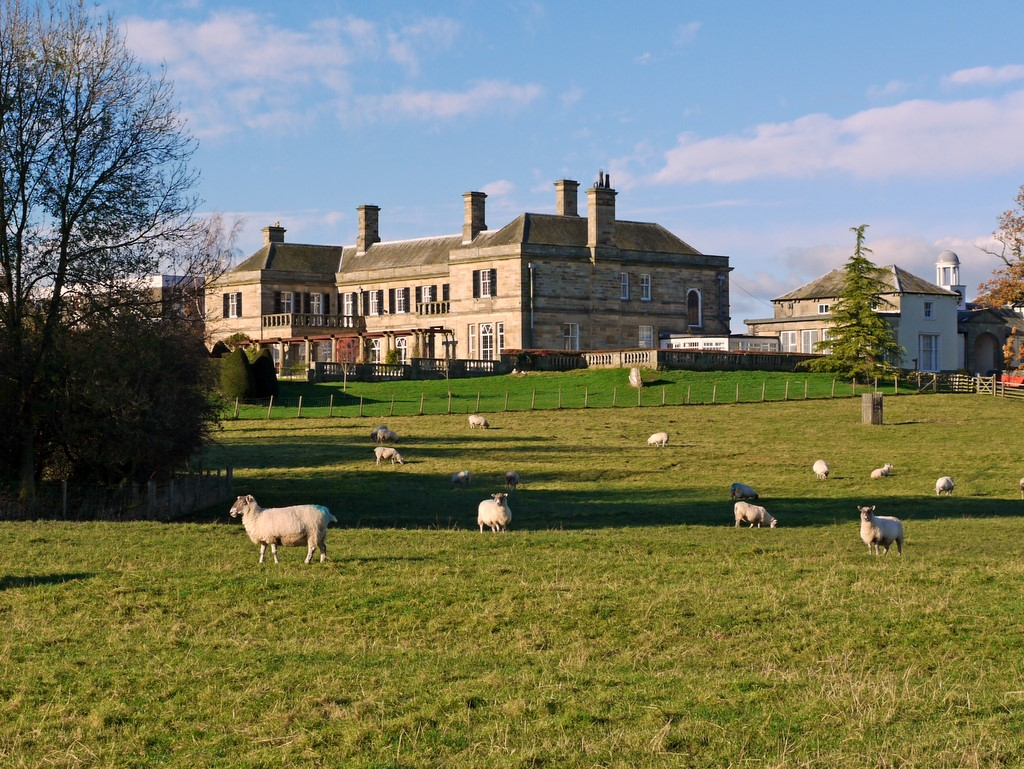
Kirkley Hall

Henry Ogle of Kirkley (1525–1580), grandson of the 3rd Baron Ogle held lands at Kirkley, near Whalton, Northumberland under Lord Eure. His sons Mark and Cuthbert (1569–1655) each bought a part of the Manor from Lord Eure around 1612. In 1632, Cuthbert built the manor Kirkley Hall, close to the site of the old house.

Cuthbert's great-grandson joined the navy, and ultimately became Admiral Sir Chaloner Ogle (1681–1750).

Another great-grandson Dr. Nathaniel Ogle (d. c. 1739) of Kirkley was an army physician under the Duke of Marlborough, and was Deputy Lieutenant of Northumberland in 1715. His son Rev. Newton Ogle (1726–1804) was Prebendary of Durham Cathedral and Dean of Winchester Cathedral and in 1764 replaced the old house at Kirkley with a substantial mansion.

Another son Chaloner Ogle (1726–1816) like his elder second cousin and namesake also joined the navy and became an Admiral. He was created a Baronet of Kings Worthy, Hampshire, in the year of his death. For details of his successors see Ogle Baronets.

Rev. John Saville Ogle (1767–1853) son of Newton, was Canon of Salisbury Cathedral and prebendary of Durham Cathedral, and in 1832 he substantially extended and improved Kirkley Hall. He repurchased from the Duke of Portland the ancient family estates at Ogle.

The Kirkley estate was sold outside the family in 1922.

== Ogle of Kings Worthy, Hampshire ==
For details of this branch see Ogle of Kirkley above and Ogle Baronets.

== Ogle of Eglingham ==
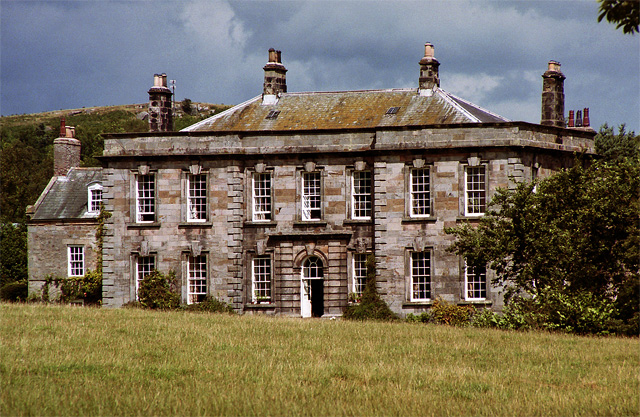
Eglingham Hall

The Ogles of Eglingham were strongly Parliamentarian during the English Civil War. Robert Ogle of Eglingham rebuilt Eglingham Hall. He created a two-storey, seven-bayed mansion that incorporated the old manor as its west wing. The Ogles sold Eglingham Hall around 1900.

Henry Ogle of Eglingham, second son of William Ogle of Choppington and nephew of the first Baron, acquired the Eglingham manor near Alnwick, Northumberland in 1514.

Luke Ogle of Eglingham (1510–1597) was a nephew of Henry. In 1565, he served as High Sheriff of Northumberland. He also built a new manor house (later to become known as Eglingham Hall) on the site of an existing pele tower.

Cpt. Henry Ogle of Eglingham (1600–1669) sequestered land for Parliament from 1643 to 1650. He also raised forces as a parliamentary commissioner from November/December 1644.

Cpt. John Ogle of Eglingham (1621–1682/6) was the son of Henry's (1600–1669). In 1654, he served as High Sheriff of Northumberland during the Commonwealth. He married Eleanor Pringle.

Henry Ogle of Eglingham (d. 1711) was the son of Cpt. John Ogle (1621–1682/6). He was High Sheriff of Northumberland in 1706/7. Henry married his first wife Apollina Howard in 1664. In November 1692, he married Grace Widdrington.

== Ogle of Berwick and Bowsden ==
Nicholas Ogle of Berwick and Bowsden (1605–1646) was the brother of Cpt. Henry Ogle of Eglingham (1600–1669), and the father of Rev. Luke Ogle of Berwick.

Rev. Luke Ogle of Berwick was the eldest son of Nicholas Ogle (1605–1646). Vocal in his views against the papacy, his open dissent during the Restoration led to his arrest and temporary confinement on a few occasions.

Samuel Ogle (1658–1718) was the son of Rev. Luke Ogle. He was recorder for Berwick and Member of Parliament. He was also Commissioner for the Colony of Maryland.

Samuel Ogle, was the grandson of Rev. Luke Ogle of Berwick. He fought at the siege of Fort William Henry and became Provincial Governor of Maryland in 1732 and began a dynasty in Maryland.

Benjamin Ogle (7 Feb 1749 – 6 Jul 1809) was Samuel's son. He was governor of Maryland from 1798 to 1801.

Benjamin Ogle Tayloe (21 May 1796 – 25 February 1868) was Benjamin's grandson and an American businessman, bon vivant, diplomat, and political activist in Washington, D.C.

== Family towers and castles ==
Towers

- Burradon
- North Middleton
- Cockle Park
- Hirst
- Choppington
- Hepple
- Tossan
- Newstead
- Downhem
- Ford
- Eglingham
- fortalice of Flotterton

Castles

- Sewingshields (Castle of the Seven Shields)
- Ogle
- Bothal
- Harbottle
- Coupland

== See also ==
- Baron Ogle
- Ogle Baronets
- Colonial families of Maryland
