= Brownrigg baronets =

Baronetcy in the Baronetage of the United Kingdom

The Brownrigg Baronetcy is a title in the Baronetage of the United Kingdom. It was created on 9 March 1816 for General Robert Brownrigg. He was Governor of Ceylon from 1813 to 1820. He was succeeded by his grandson, the second Baronet. On his death the title passed to his younger brother, the third Baronet. His eldest surviving son, the fourth Baronet, was a Rear-Admiral in the Royal Navy. As of 2026 the title is dormant.

== Brownrigg baronets (1816) ==
- Sir Robert Brownrigg, 1st Baronet (1758–1833)
  - Colonel R. J. Brownrigg
- Sir Robert William Colebrooke Brownrigg, 2nd Baronet (1817–1882)
- Sir Henry Moore Brownrigg, 3rd Baronet (1819–1900)
- Rear Admiral Sir Douglas Egremont Robert Brownrigg, CB, 4th Baronet (1867–1939)
  - Gawen Egremont Brownrigg (1911–1938)
- Sir Nicholas Gawen Brownrigg, 5th Baronet (1932–2018)
- Sir Michael Gawen Brownrigg, presumed 6th Baronet (b. 1961). As of 2026, the baronetcy is dormant, the presumed holder not having established his claim.

The heir apparent is the current presumed holder's eldest son, Nicholas James Brownrigg (born 1993).

== Arms ==
Coat of arms of Brownrigg baronets
Crest 1st (of augmentation), A Demi-Kandian proper the body vested Argent and belted Or Cap Gold in the dexter hand a Sword and in the sinister a representation of the Kandian Crown also proper; 2nd, A Mural Crown Or thereon a Sword erect entwined by a Serpent Vert. Escutcheon Argent a Lion rampant guardant Sable grasping in the dexter paw a Sword Pommel and Hilt Or thereon a Serpent entwined proper between three Crescents Gules, and as an honourable augmentation (granted by King George IV on 23 Mar 1822) a Chief embattled Vert thereon a representation of the Sceptre of the King of Kandy Or and the Banner of the said king being Gules within a Bordure with a Ray of the Sun issuing from each angle a Lion passant Gold holding a Sword proper in saltire the whole ensigned with a representation of the Crown of the kingdom of Kandy also proper. Motto Virescat Vulnere Virtus (Valour strengthens from a wound)

== Notes ==
Baronetage of the United Kingdom
Preceded by Ochterlony baronets	Brownrigg baronets 9 March 1816	Succeeded by Ogle baronets
