= Ogle, Northumberland =

Village in Northumberland, England

Coordinates: 55.101°N 1.790°W

Ogle
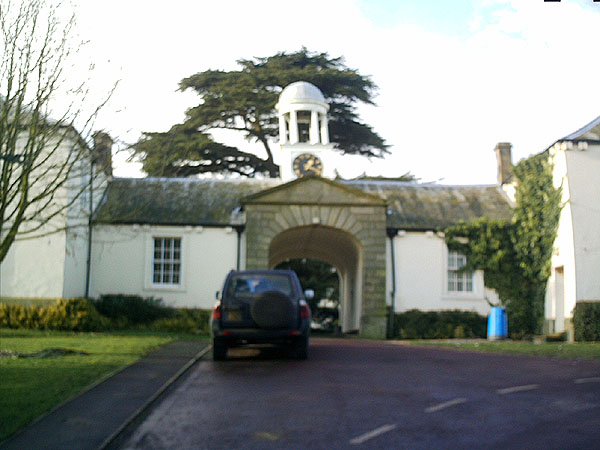
- Kirkley Hall entrance

- Location within Northumberland
- OS grid reference: NZ137789
- Civil parish: Whalton
- Unitary authority: Northumberland
- Ceremonial county: Northumberland
- Region: North East
- Country: England
- Sovereign state: United Kingdom
- Post town: NEWCASTLE UPON TYNE
- Postcode district: NE20
- Dialling code: 01661
- Police: Northumbria
- Fire: Northumberland
- Ambulance: North East
- UK Parliament: Hexham

Ogle is a village in and former civil parish, now in the parish of Whalton, Northumberland, England, north-west of Ponteland and south-west of Morpeth. The surname Ogle comes from here, where the Ogle family built Ogle Castle and owned Kirkley Hall. In 1951 the parish had a population of 122.

== Governance ==
Ogle was formerly a township in Whalton parish, from 1866 Ogle was a civil parish in its own right until it was abolished on 1 April 1955 and merged with Whalton.

== Landmarks ==
Ogle Castle is a former fortified manor house and is a scheduled monument and a Grade I listed building. The moated site on the bank of the Ogle Burn presents the remains of a medieval tower incorporated into a 16th-century manor. Licence to crenellate the manor was granted to Robert Ogle in 1341. William the Conqueror granted a deed to Humphrey de Hoggell (Ogle) to enjoy all the liberties and royalties of his manor after the conquest. The Ogle family held the estate from before the Norman Conquest until 1597 when it passed by marriage to the Cavendish family and later to Hollis.

Kirkley Hall, a 17th-century historic country mansion and Grade II listed building situated on the bank of the River Blyth, is now a Horticultural and Agricultural training centre.

The manor of Kirkley was granted to the de Eure family in 1267 and Sir William Eure was recorded as in occupation of a tower house there in 1415. In the early 17th century the manor came into the ownership of the Ogle family and in 1632 Cuthbert Ogle built a new manor house close to the site of the old house. Substantial alterations were made to the structure in 1764 by Rev Newton Ogle (1726–1804), Dean of Winchester Cathedral, who also in 1788 erected an obelisk in the grounds commemorating the accession of William III and Mary II in 1689. The house was substantially rebuilt by Rev John Saville Ogle in about 1832.

The Ogles disposed of their Kirkley estates in 1922. The Hall which passed to Sir William Noble (later Lord Kirkley) was damaged by fire in 1929 and largely rebuilt by him on a somewhat reduced scale. In 1946 the estate was acquired by the Northumberland County Council and in 1951 Kirkley Hall Farm Institute was established. In 1999 the estate became the land studies campus of Northumberland College.

== Toponymy ==
This unusual place name can be most plausibly explained as being derived from the Old English meaning Ocga's hill. Ogle is less likely to have been derived from Cumbric huchel, 'high', typically indicating an elevated area of land.

== Notable people ==
Notable members of the Ogle family connected with Kirkley include:

- Chaloner Ogle (1681–1750), Admiral (Royal Navy)
- Sir Chaloner Ogle, 1st Baronet (1726–1816), Admiral (Royal Navy)

== See also ==
- Baron Ogle
- Ogle Baronets
