= Sir Charles Ogle, 2nd Baronet =

Royal Navy Admiral of the Fleet (1775–1858)

Admiral of the Fleet Sir Charles Ogle Bt
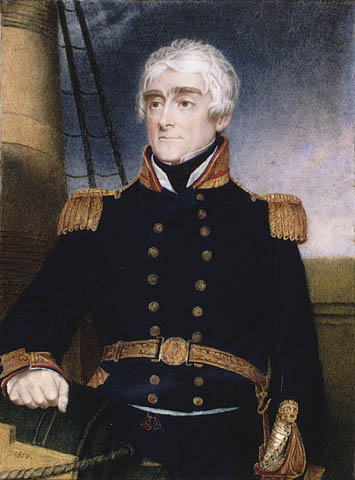
- Admiral Sir Charles Ogle, Bart, portrait by Cornelius Durham, 1850
- Born: 24 May 1775; Worthy Park House, Hampshire
- Died: 16 June 1858 (aged 83); Tunbridge Wells, Kent
- Burial place: St Mary's Church, Ponteland, Northumberland
- Military career
- Allegiance: United Kingdom
- Branch: Royal Navy
- Service years: 1787–1848
- Rank: Admiral of the Fleet
- Commands: HMS Assurance; HMS Avenger; HMS Peterel; HMS Minerva; HMS Meleager; HMS Greyhound; HMS Égyptienne; HMS Unite; HMS Princess Augusta; HMS Ramillies; HMS Malta; HMS Rivoli; North American Station; Portsmouth Command
- Conflicts: French Revolutionary Wars; Napoleonic Wars

Admiral of the Fleet Sir Charles Ogle, 2nd Baronet (24 May 1775 – 16 June 1858) was a Royal Navy officer. As a junior officer, he saw action leading storming parties at the capture of Martinique and at the capture of Guadeloupe during the French Revolutionary Wars. He also took part in the landings in Egypt in the later stages of the French Revolutionary Wars.

During the Napoleonic Wars, Ogle commanded of the fifth-rate HMS Unite in the Mediterranean Fleet. He went on to be Commander-in-Chief, North American Station and then Commander-in-Chief, Portsmouth. He also briefly served as Tory Member of Parliament for the rotten borough of Portarlington.

== Early career ==
The capture of Fort Louis, Martinique: Ogle led a boarding party during this operation

Born the eldest son of Admiral Sir Chaloner Ogle, 1st Baronet and Hester Ogle (daughter of the Rt. Rev. John Thomas), Ogle was educated at Hyde Abbey School in Winchester before joining the Royal Navy in 1787. He initially served as a captain's servant in the fifth-rate HMS Adventure in the West Africa Squadron and then transferred to the fourth-rate HMS Medusa in the same squadron. Promoted to midshipman, he joined the third-rate HMS Alcide at Portsmouth in September 1791 and then served in the fifth-rate HMS Winchelsea on the North America Station followed by the third-rate HMS Edgar in the Home Fleet and then by the second-rate HMS Boyne in the Channel Squadron.

Ogle was promoted to lieutenant on 14 November 1793 and assigned to the fifth-rate HMS Woolwich on the West Indies Station. He transferred to the third-rate HMS Vengeance in December 1793 and then returned to the second-rate HMS Boyne in January 1794, by which time she was serving as flagship to Vice-Admiral Sir John Jervis, Commander-in-Chief, West Indies Station. He saw action leading storming parties at the capture of Martinique in March 1794 and at the capture of Guadeloupe in April 1794 during the French Revolutionary Wars.

Ogle was briefly acting commander of the fifth-rate HMS Assurance before being promoted to commander on 21 May 1794 and being given command of the sloop HMS Avenger later that month. Ogle next served under Vice-Admiral Sir John Jervis in the Mediterranean Fleet becoming commanding officer of the sloop HMS Peterel in November 1795 and, having been promoted to captain on 11 January 1796, becoming commanding officer of the fifth-rate HMS Minerva later that month. Ogle went on to be commanding officer of the fifth-rate HMS Meleager in Spring 1797 and saw action during the assault on Cádiz in June 1797. After that he was given command of the fifth-rate HMS Greyhound and then of the fifth-rate HMS Égyptienne in which he took part in the landings in Egypt in March 1801.

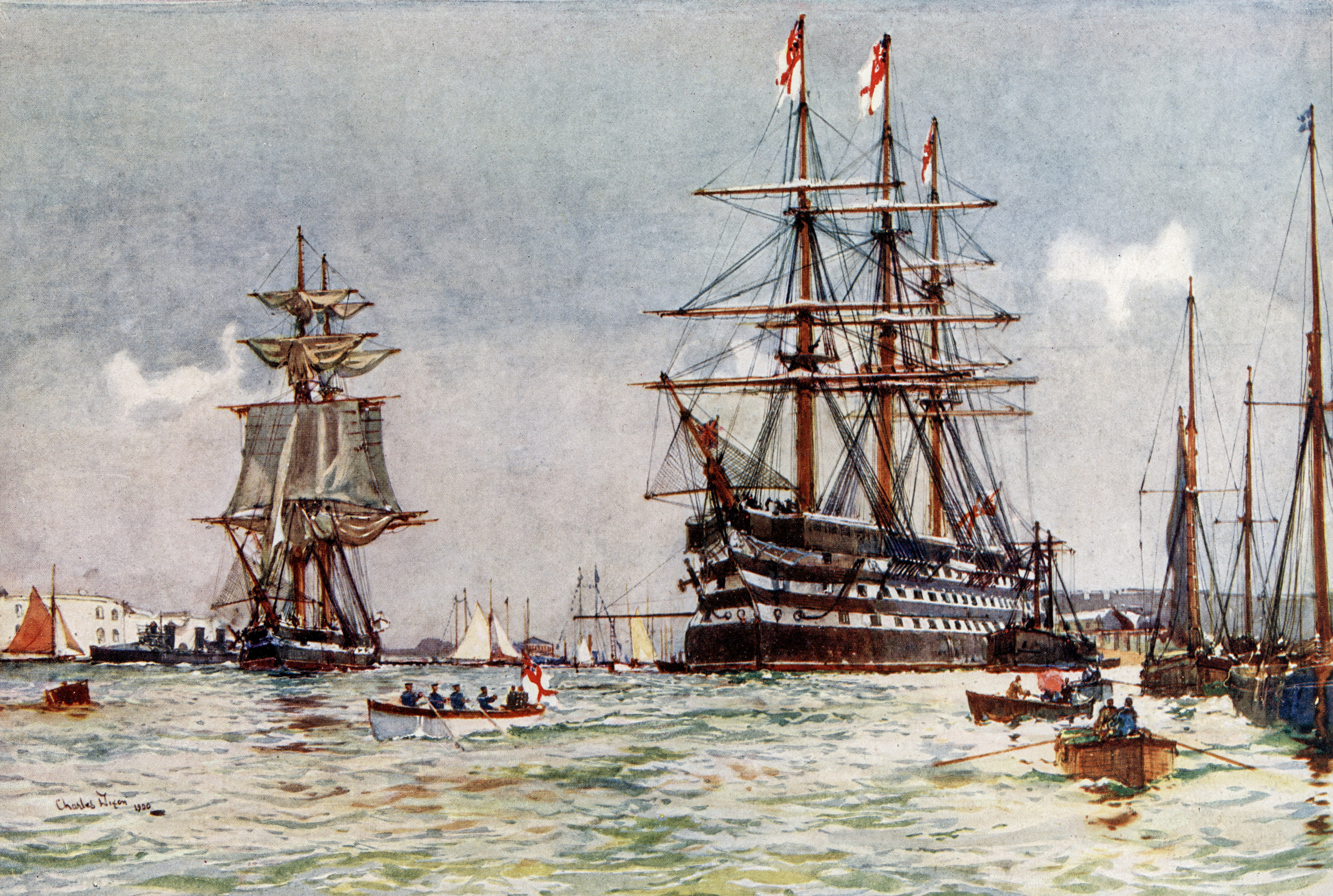
The first-rate HMS St Vincent, Ogle's flagship as Commander-in-Chief, Portsmouth. Painted by Charles Dixon

Following the outbreak of the Napoleonic Wars, Ogle was given command of the fifth-rate HMS Unite in the Mediterranean Fleet in April 1805 and then became commanding officer of the Royal Yacht HMS Princess Augusta in June 1806. He transferred to the command of the third-rate HMS Ramillies in the Channel Squadron in August 1815, of the command of the second-rate HMS Malta at Plymouth in November 1815 and finally of the third-rate HMS Rivoli at Portsmouth in January 1816.

Ogle succeeded to his father's title and estates in August 1816 and commissioned Sir Robert Smirke to demolish the west wing of Worthy Park House and replace it with a new building, built in the Georgian style.

== Senior command ==
Promoted to rear-admiral on 12 August 1819, Ogle became Commander-in-Chief, North American Station, with his flag in the fifth-rate HMS Hussar, in April 1827. He was promoted to vice-admiral on 22 July 1830 on leaving the North American Station and was elected as Tory Member of Parliament for the rotten borough of Portarlington at the general election in September 1830; he retired at the dissolution of Parliament a year later without having spoken in any debates. In his later years Ogle lived at No. 4 Belgrave Square in London.

Promoted to full admiral on 23 November 1841, Ogle became Commander-in-Chief, Portsmouth, with his flag in the first-rate HMS St Vincent, in 1845. He was promoted to Admiral of the Fleet on 8 November 1857, died at Tunbridge Wells on 16 June 1858 and was buried at the churchyard of St Mary's Church at Ponteland in Northumberland (not far from Kirkley Hall, the ancestral home of the Ogle family).

== Family ==
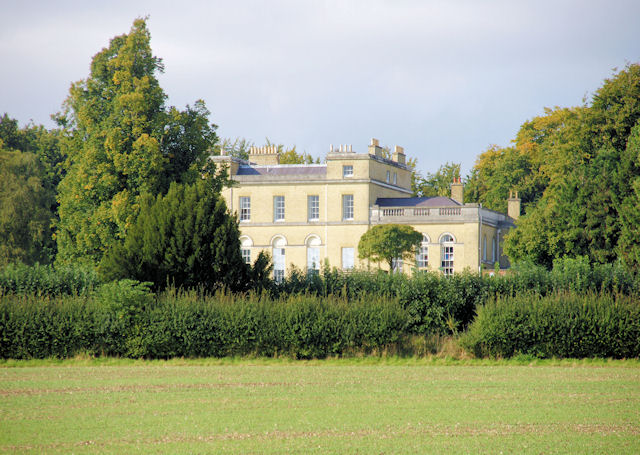
Worthy Park House: Ogle commissioned a major re-modelling of the house

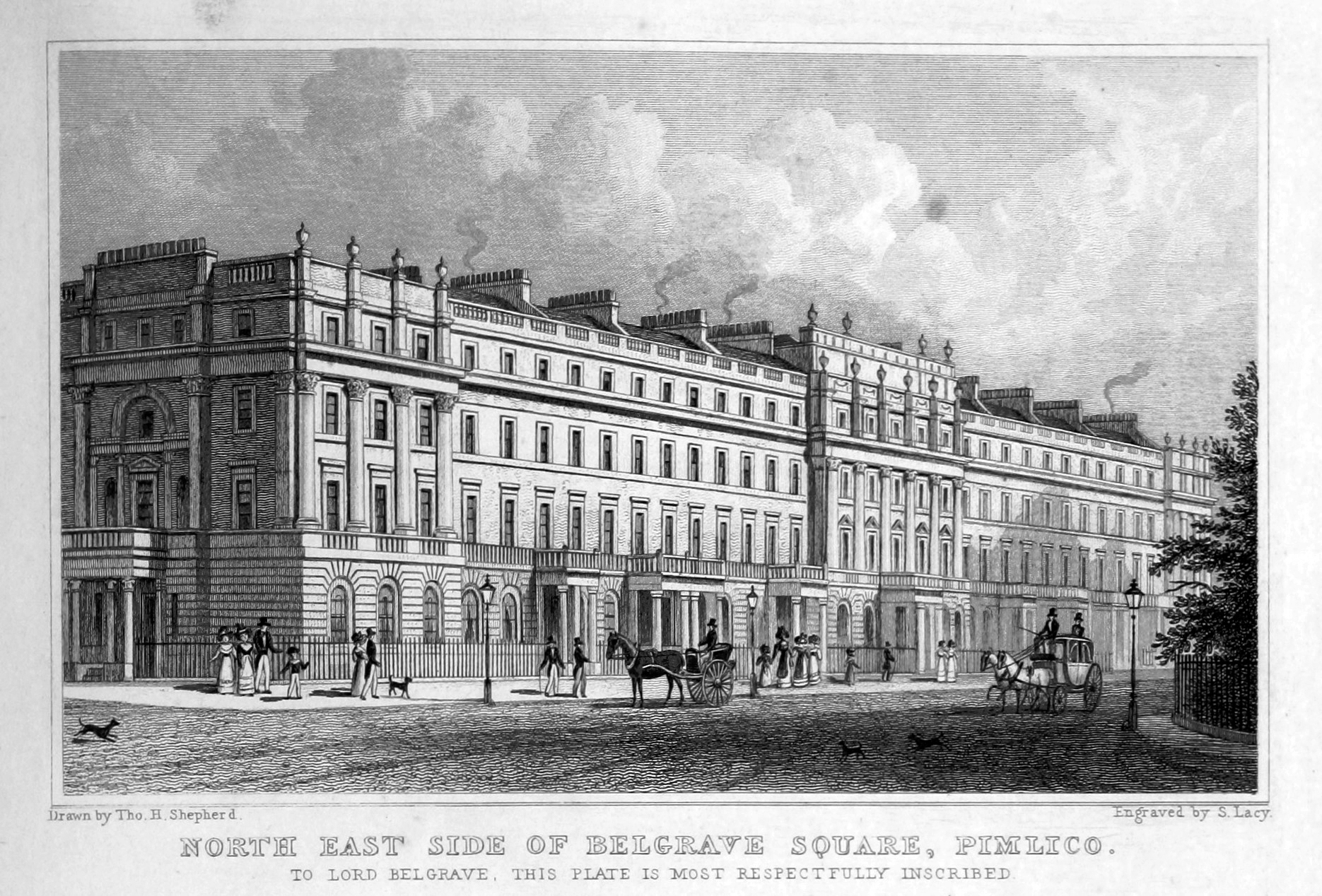
Belgrave Square in London: Ogle lived at No. 4

In 1802 Ogle married Charlotte Margaret Gage, daughter of General Thomas Gage: they had two daughters and a son. In 1820, following the death of his first wife, he married Letitia Burroughs; they had one son. In 1834, following the death of his second wife, he married Mary Anne, the daughter of George Cary of Torre Abbey, Devon and widow of Sir John Hayford Thorold, 10th Baronet of Syston Park. Ogle was the brother-in-law of General Sir Charles Asgill and Executor of his will. He also inherited, in perpetuity, the portrait of Asgill, painted in 1822 by Thomas Phillips.

== Legacy ==
- The ferry, Sir Charles Ogle, was named after the baronet.

== See also ==
- O'Byrne, William Richard (1849). "Ogle, Charles" . A Naval Biographical Dictionary . John Murray – via Wikisource.

== Sources ==
- Heathcote, Tony (2002). The British Admirals of the Fleet 1734 – 1995. Pen & Sword. ISBN 0-85052-835-6.

Parliament of the United Kingdom
Preceded by James Farquahar	Member of Parliament for Portarlington; 1830–1831	Succeeded by Sir William Rae, Bt
Military offices
Preceded by Sir Willoughby Lake	Commander-in-Chief, North America and West Indies Station; 1827–1830	Succeeded by Sir Edward Colpoys
Preceded by Sir Charles Rowley	Commander-in-Chief, Portsmouth; 1845–1848	Succeeded by Sir Thomas Capel
Baronetage of the United Kingdom
Preceded by Chaloner Ogle	Baronet (of Worthy); 1816–1858	Succeeded by Chaloner Ogle
