= William Noble, 1st Baron Kirkley =

British businessman (1863-1935)

The Right Honourable The Lord Kirkley JP
- Sir William Noble, c. 1929
- Born: William Joseph Noble; 13 January 1863; Newcastle upon Tyne, England
- Died: 11 September 1935 (aged 72)
- Occupation: Shipowner

William Joseph Noble, 1st Baron Kirkley, JP (13 January 1863 – 11 September 1935), known as Sir William Noble, Bt, between 1921 and 1930, was a British shipowner.

== Background ==
Noble was born in Newcastle upon Tyne, the son of John Noble and Mary, daughter of James Black.

== Career ==
Noble entered the shipping business at the age of fifteen and became a partner in Cairns, Noble & Co, which operated the Cairn Line and was later taken over by Furness, Withy & Co Ltd, of which he became a director. He remained chairman of the Cairn Line until his death. He was first honorary president of the Baltic and White Sea Conference from 1913 to 1921 and also served as president of the Chamber of Shipping in 1920 and on the Executive of the Shipping Federation. He was a member of the Tyne Improvement Commissioners and was shipping representative on the advisory sub-committee of the Ministry of Transport. He was vice-president of the Newcastle and Gateshead Chamber of Commerce from 1915 until his death and was president of the Institute of Chartered Shipbrokers in 1919–1921 and 1929. During the First World War he served on a number of government and local committees. In 1930 he led the British Economic Mission to South Africa.

Noble was created a Baronet, of West Denton Hall in the County of Northumberland, in the 1921 Birthday Honours and raised to the peerage as Baron Kirkley, of Kirkley in the County of Northumberland, in 1930, taking his title from Kirkley Hall, Northumberland, which he bought in 1929.

== Personal life ==
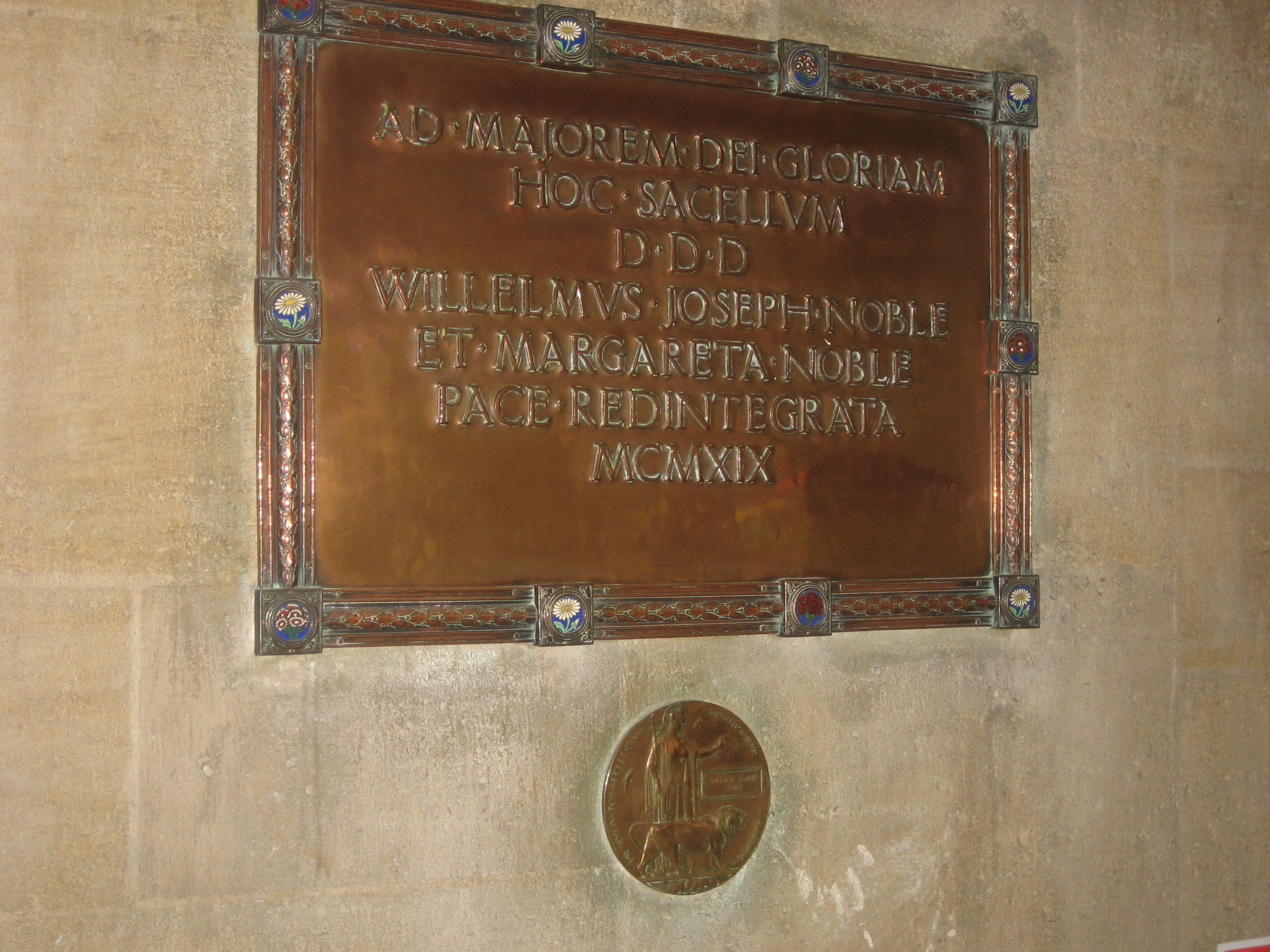
Noble memorial plaque ("peace restored 1919") with below a Memorial Plaque in Westminster College, Cambridge

Kirkley married Margaret, daughter of William Dixon, in 1888.

The couple had four children, two sons and two daughters. Their older son, William Black Noble, was killed in the First World War, and their second son, John, died in infancy. They funded the new chapel at Westminster College, Cambridge to commemorate the death of their son William in the war.

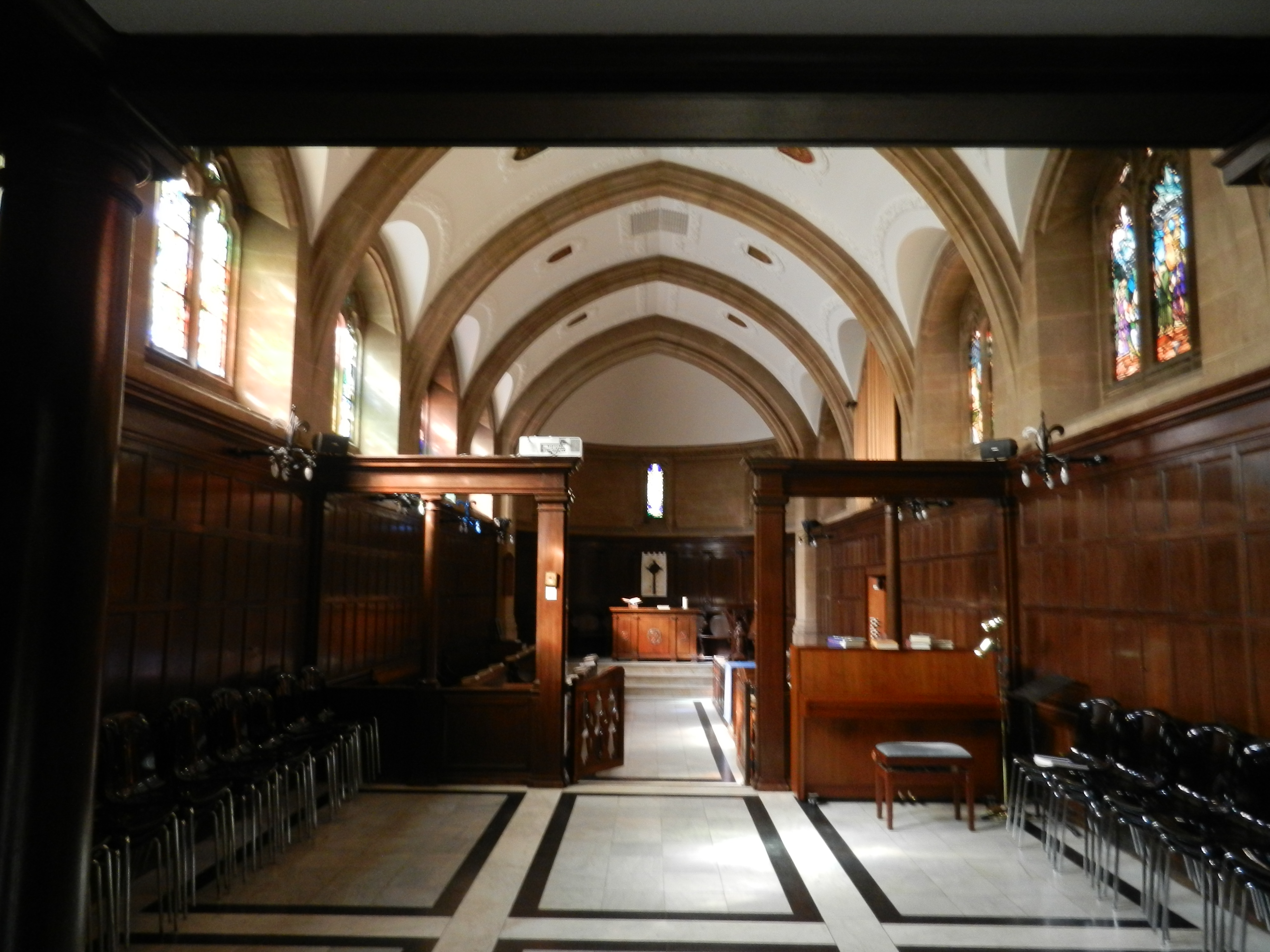
The chapel at Westminster College

Their elder daughter, Sheila, married the surgeon Frederick Williamson. Their younger daughter, Phyllis, married Cecil Dodd, son of Sir Edwin Dodd, later changing her name to Dodd-Noble.

Lady Noble died in September 1928. Kirkley survived his wife by seven years and died in September 1935, aged 72. His titles became extinct upon his death, as he had no surviving male issue.

== Footnotes ==
Peerage of the United Kingdom
New creation	Baron Kirkley; 1930–1935	Extinct
Baronetage of the United Kingdom
New creation	Baronet (of West Denton Hall); 1921–1935	Extinct
