= HMS Aquilon (1758) =

Coventry-class Royal Navy frigate

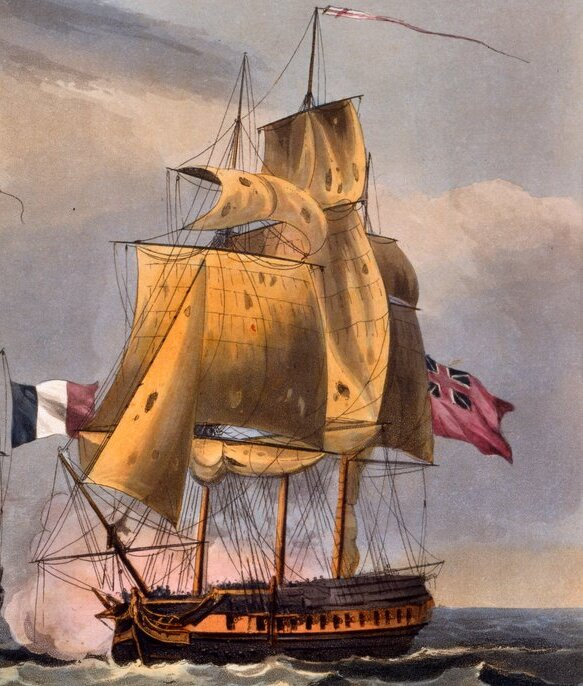
- Aquilon was built to the same design as HMS Carysfort, (pictured)

History

Great Britain
- Name: HMS Aquilon
- Namesake: Celebrating the 1757 sinking of the French frigate Aquilon, lit. 'Northeast Wind'
- Ordered: 6 May 1757
- Builder: Robert Inwood, Rotherhithe
- Laid down: 15 June 1757
- Launched: 24 May 1758
- Completed: 30 June 1758 at Deptford Dockyard
- Commissioned: January 1758
- In service: 1758–1763; 1765–1769
- Fate: Sold at Deptford 29 November 1776

General characteristics
- Class & type: 28-gun Coventry-class sixth-rate frigate
- Tons burthen: 599 8/94 bm
- Length: 118 ft 7.5 in (36.2 m) (gundeck); 98 ft 3.25 in (30.0 m) (keel)
- Beam: 33 ft 10.25 in (10.3 m)
- Depth of hold: 10 ft 6 in (3.20 m)
- Sail plan: Full-rigged ship
- Complement: 200
- Armament: 28 guns comprising: Upperdeck: 24 × 9-pounder guns; Quarterdeck: 4 × 3-pounder guns; 12 × 1/2-pounder swivel guns

HMS Aquilon was a 28-gun Coventry-class sixth-rate frigate of the Royal Navy. Launched in 1758, she saw active service against the French during the Seven Years' War, capturing seven enemy vessels in the first eight months of 1761. She was declared surplus to Navy requirements and sold into private hands in 1776.

== Construction ==
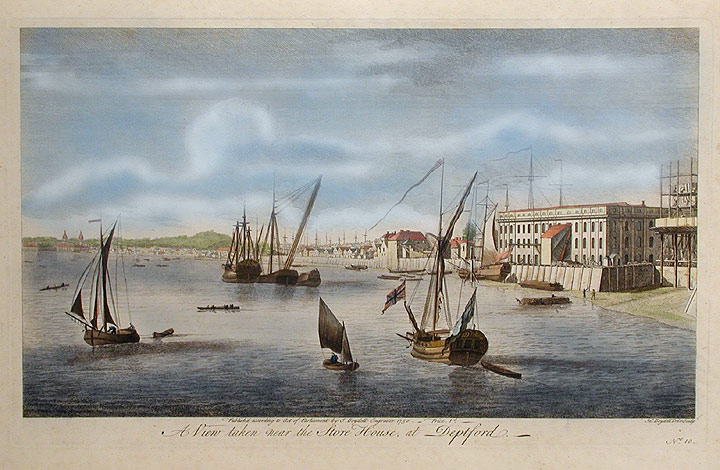
The waterfront at Deptford, where Aquilon was completed in 1758.

Aquilon was an oak-built 28-gun sixth-rate, one of 18 vessels forming part of the Coventry-class of frigates. As with others in her class she was loosely modeled on the design and dimensions of HMS Tartar, launched in 1756 and responsible for capturing five French privateers in her first twelve months at sea. Admiralty contracts for Aquilon's construction were issued to commercial shipwright Robert Inwood of Rotherhithe on 23 May 1757, with a stipulation that work be completed within twelve months. Her keel was laid down on 15 June 1757 and work proceeded apace, with completion on 24 May 1758, just outside the contracted time.

As built, Aquilon was 118 ft 17.5 in (36.4 m) long with a 98 ft 3 in (29.9 m) keel, a beam of 33 ft 10 in (10.31 m), and measuring 5998/94 tons burthen. Her armament comprised 24 nine-pounder cannons located along her gun deck, supported by four three-pounder cannons on the quarterdeck and twelve 1/2-pounder swivel guns ranged along her sides. Her crewing complement was 200 officers and men.

== Naval service ==
=== European service ===
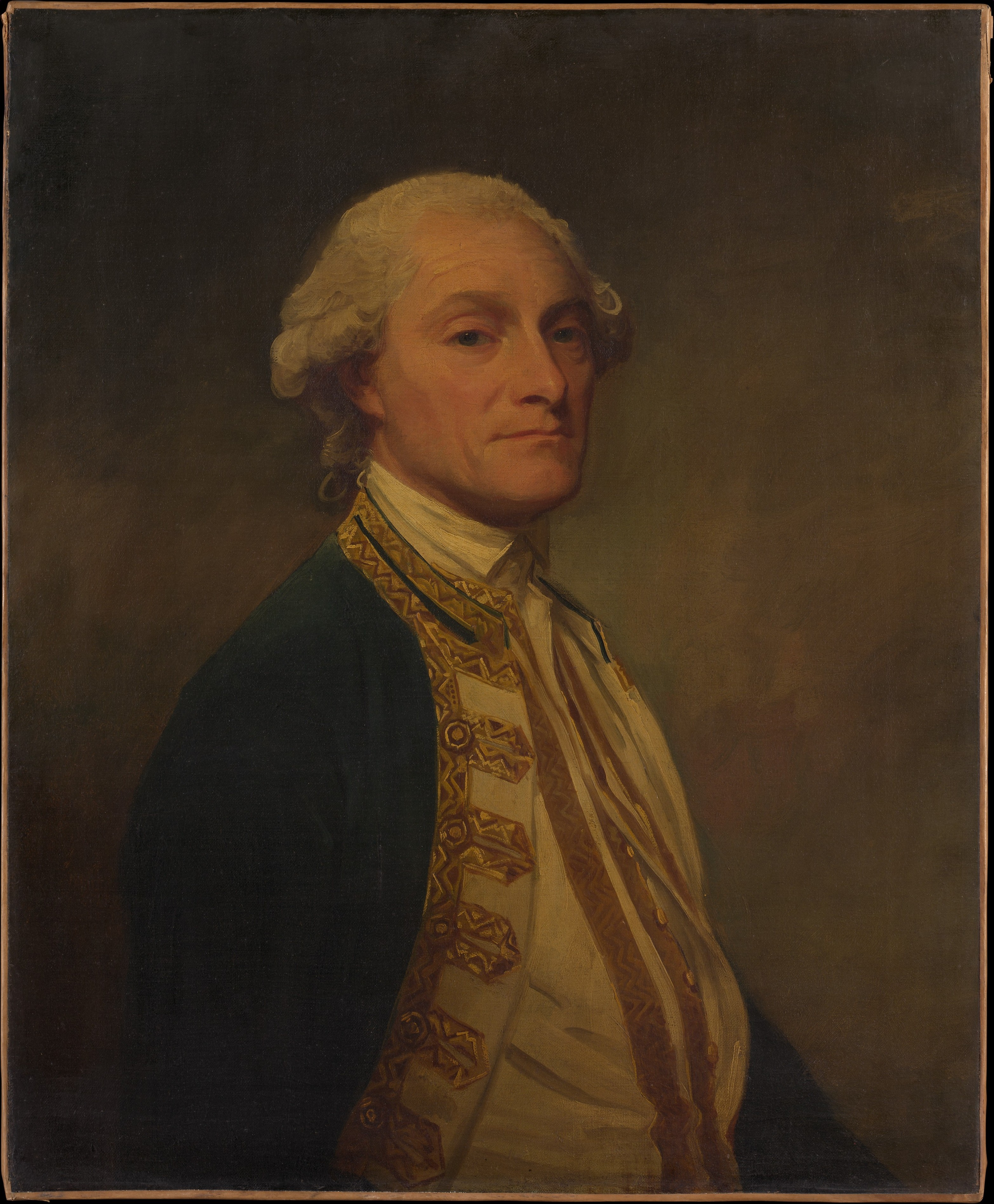
Chaloner Ogle, Aquilon's captain from 1758–1763

Aquilon was commissioned into the Royal Navy in May 1758, during the Seven Years' War with France and Spain. Her first commander was Captain Chaloner Ogle, newly transferred from HMS Yarmouth. After assembling crew and stores, Aquilon was put to sea in late June. After a voyage to Gibraltar in December, she was assigned to a British squadron under the overall command of Commodore John Brett, where she spent a year on patrol in The Downs.

In 1760 she was transferred to the fleet cruising in the English Channel and off the French and Spanish coastlines, under the command of Admiral George Rodney. Rodney's orders included the harassment of enemy shipping and the capture of privateers, and Aquilon swiftly proved her worth in taking six French prizes in her first eight months. The first was the 10-gun privateer La Marie-Therese, captured on 12 January. Another vessel, La Royal Cantabre, was seized on the following day. Both captured vessels were transported to the Irish port of Cork where they were transferred to Admiralty control. Prize money for these captures was not paid to Aquilon's crew until March 1763.

On 30 January Aquilon was off the coast of Portugal when her crew observed three vessels to their west. Two of the three immediately fled while the third drew closer, apparently planning to hail or engage the British ship. The vessel was a 20-gun French privateer, Le Comte de Gramont from the city of Bayonne. Belatedly realising that Aquilon was a Royal Navy ship, the privateer's crew crowded on sail and attempted to escape. Aquilon gave chase and overhauled the French vessel the following day. The outgunned French surrendered without incident, and Le Comte de Gramont's 117 crew were taken prisoner. They, the vessel and its cargo of indigo and deer skins were transported to Lisbon and handed over to Admiralty control.

Further victories followed. The 12-gun Le Zephyr was captured off the coast of Ushant on 4 March and sailed to Spithead. On 13 April the 10-gun La Poste was taken, and the 10-gun L'Aurore from La Rochelle was seized off Cape Machicaco, Spain in July. On 7 August Aquilon was off Cape Finisterre when she overhauled and captured La Subtile, a 16-gun French East Indiaman from Mauritius. The East Indiaman's 84 crew were taken prisoner and handed over to Navy authorities in Plymouth. Alone on patrol in late August 1761 she encountered a 74-gun French ship of the line, and attempted to flee. After a brief chase both vessels were becalmed, and Captain Ogle ordered his crew into the boats to row ahead of Aquilon and tow her out of range. The crew of the French vessel followed suit and both vessels were dragged forward under oars; after 26 hours of rowing the British vessel had made sufficient headway that the French gave up the pursuit.

French vessels captured by Aquilon, 1761
Date	Ship	Type	Guns	Crew	Home port
12 January	La Marie Therese	privateer	10	75	unrecorded
13 January	Le Royal Cantabre	privateer	unrecorded	Less than 75	unrecorded
31 January	Le Comte de Gramont	privateer	20	117	Bayonne
4 March	Le Zephyr	privateer	12	114	Bayonne
13 April	La Poste	unrecorded	unrecorded	unrecorded	unrecorded
July	L' Aurore	privateer	10	75	La Rochelle
7 August	La Subtile	East Indiaman	16	84	Mauritius

=== Caribbean service ===
This was Aquilon's final victory in European waters; in late 1761 she was assigned to support a planned invasion of France's Caribbean stronghold of Martinique, as part of Admiral Rodney's fleet of 17 ships of the line escorting more than 25,000 British troops. She set sail for the Caribbean on 19 December 1761 and was stationed on arrival off the Leeward Islands. On 28 January she achieved the minor victory of retaking the Portland, a British merchant snow which had previously fallen into French hands. Martinique fell to Rodney's forces on 4 February. On 26 March Rodney was superseded by Admiral George Pocock who commenced plans for the capture of Spanish Havana but left Aquilon at her previous station off the Leeward Islands. She played no active role in the final year of war with France and Spain, and was still at her station when peace was declared in March 1763.

=== Peace and decommissioning ===
Chaloner Ogle left the ship in July 1763 and was replaced by Captain Philip Perceval. Aquilon herself was by now surplus to Navy requirements and after a brief cruise along the coast of Newfoundland she was returned to Chatham Dockyard where she was decommissioned and her crew paid off to join other vessels. A Navy Board survey was conducted in October 1763 but no repairs were made.

Refitting finally began in December 1764, lasting six months and costing £5,064. The newly seaworthy Aquilon was recommissioned in April under the command of Captain Richard Onslow, and was returned to sea as part of Britain's Mediterranean presence in February 1766. After three years' service, she was again decommissioned in July 1769 and returned to Deptford Dockyard for disposal.

After seven years at Deptford Aquilon was sold out of Navy service on 29 November 1776, for £725.
