= Worthy Park House =

Country house in Hampshire, England

Coordinates: 51.09341°N 1.28521°W

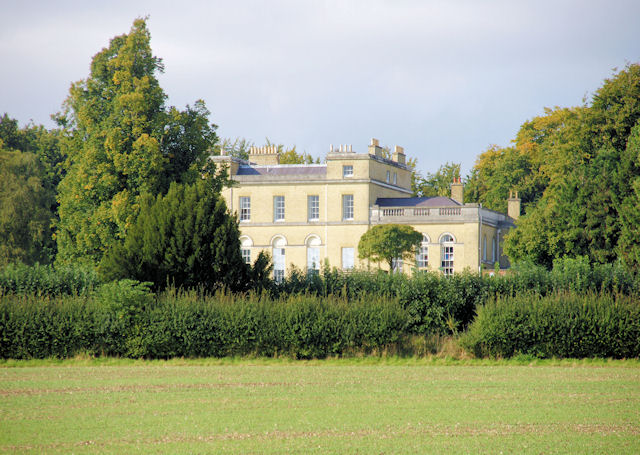
Worthy Park House

Worthy Park House is a large country house at Kings Worthy near Winchester. It is a Grade II* listed building.

== History ==
The original house on the site was built by William Evelyn in 1722. It was bought by Sir Chaloner Ogle, 1st Baronet in 1773. Admiral Sir Charles Ogle, 2nd Baronet inherited the house in 1816 and commissioned Sir Robert Smirke to demolish the west wing and replace it with a new building, built in the Georgian style, which was completed in 1820.

The house was acquired by Samuel Wall, a banker in 1825 (died 1843) but remained in the Wall family until it passed by marriage to Captain Charles Gilbert Fryer in the mid 1870s. It then remained in the Fryer family passing to Colonel James A Butchart, again by marriage c1920. During the Second World War it was taken over by the British Army. After the war it served as a training centre owned first by Currys and then by National Express. The house became Prince's Mead School in 1999.

== Owners and occupiers ==
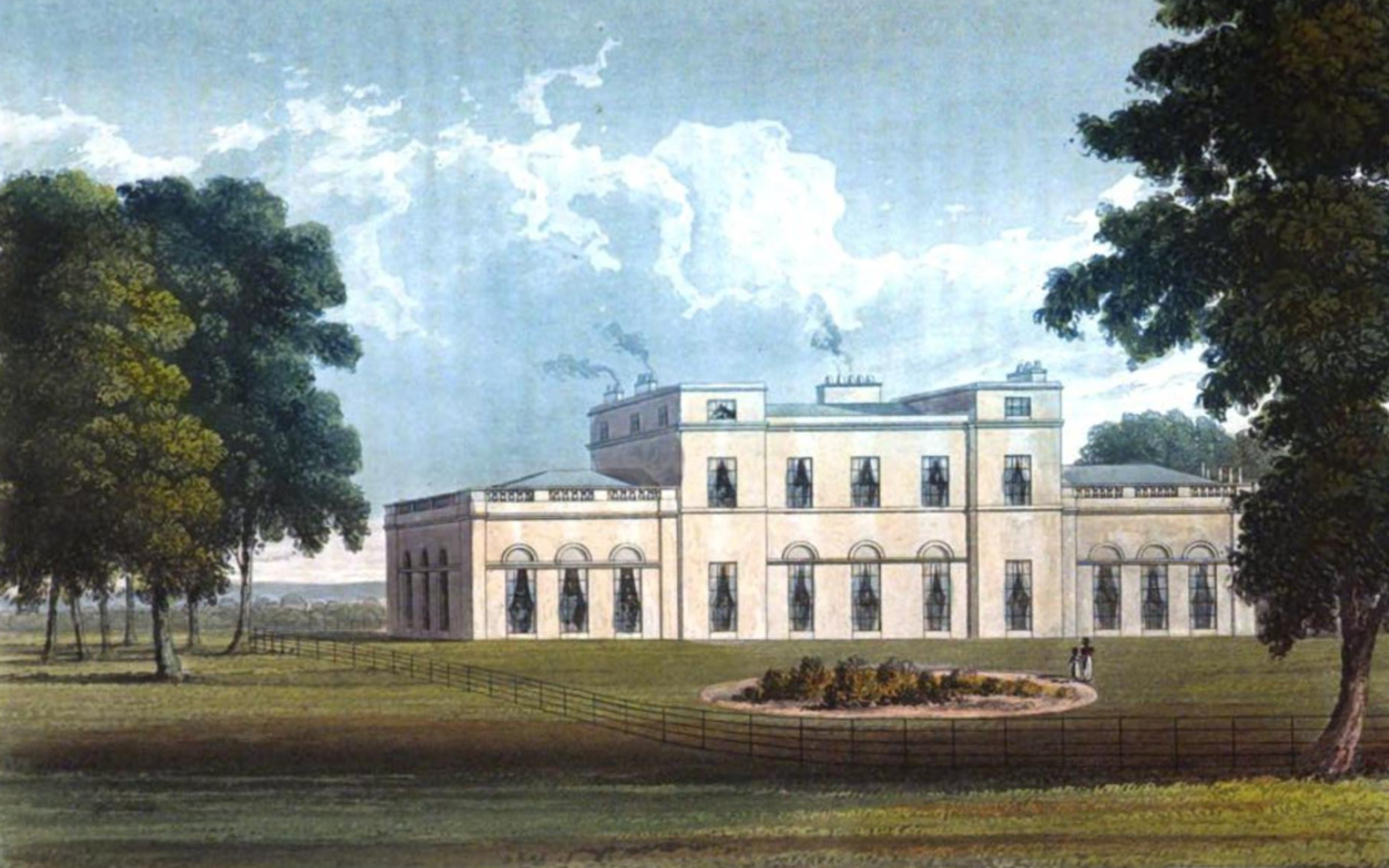
Engraving of Worthy Park in 1825.

Admiral Sir Charles Ogle (1775-1858) built the present house in 1820. It was the same year that he married his second wife Letitia Burroughs (1783-1832). In 1825 there was a feature article in a publication of that time. The accompanying coloured engraving within the article is shown and some of text is as follows:

"This beautiful rural residence has been lately constructed for the present proprietor under the superintendence of Robert Smirke Esq. whose design for the mansion possesses every necessary convenience combined with a display of taste and judgement which reflect great credit upon the architect."

In 1825 he sold the house to Samuel Wall (1775-1843) who was a banker from Worcester. In 1812 he married Elizabeth Binns (1788-1835) co-heiress of John Binns of Leeds. The couple had five children. In 1833 Worthy Park again featured in a publication of that time. It included a drawing of the lodge and the house and contained a detailed description of each room in the house.

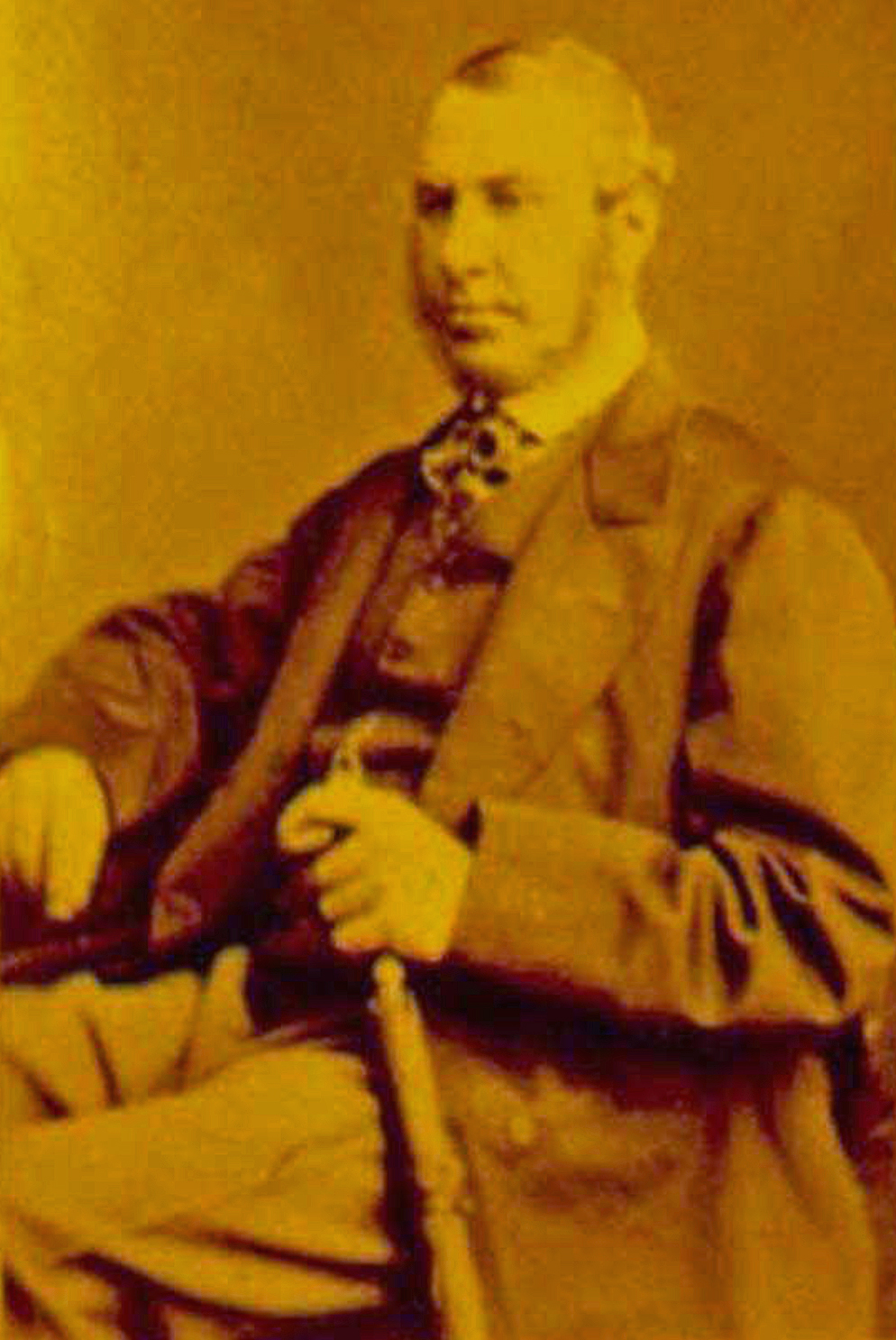
George Alfred Ellis Wall

Samuel’s wife Elizabeth died in 1835 and two years later he married Eliza Anne Lechmere (1789-1875) who was the daughter of Sir Anthony Lechmere, 1st Baronet. She is recorded in the 1841 Census as living at Worthy Park with Samuel, two of his sons, her sister Georgiana Lechmere and nine servants.

George Alfred Ellis Wall (1824-1875) was a landowner. In 1852 he married Katherine Rivers (1826-1895) who was the daughter of Sir Henry Rivers, 9th Baronet. She inherited the River’s estate when her brother died in 1870. The couple had one daughter Katherine Georgina Wall (1854-1916). When George died in 1875 his daughter Katherine inherited the house. In the same year she married Captain Charles Gilbert Fryer (1839-1919).

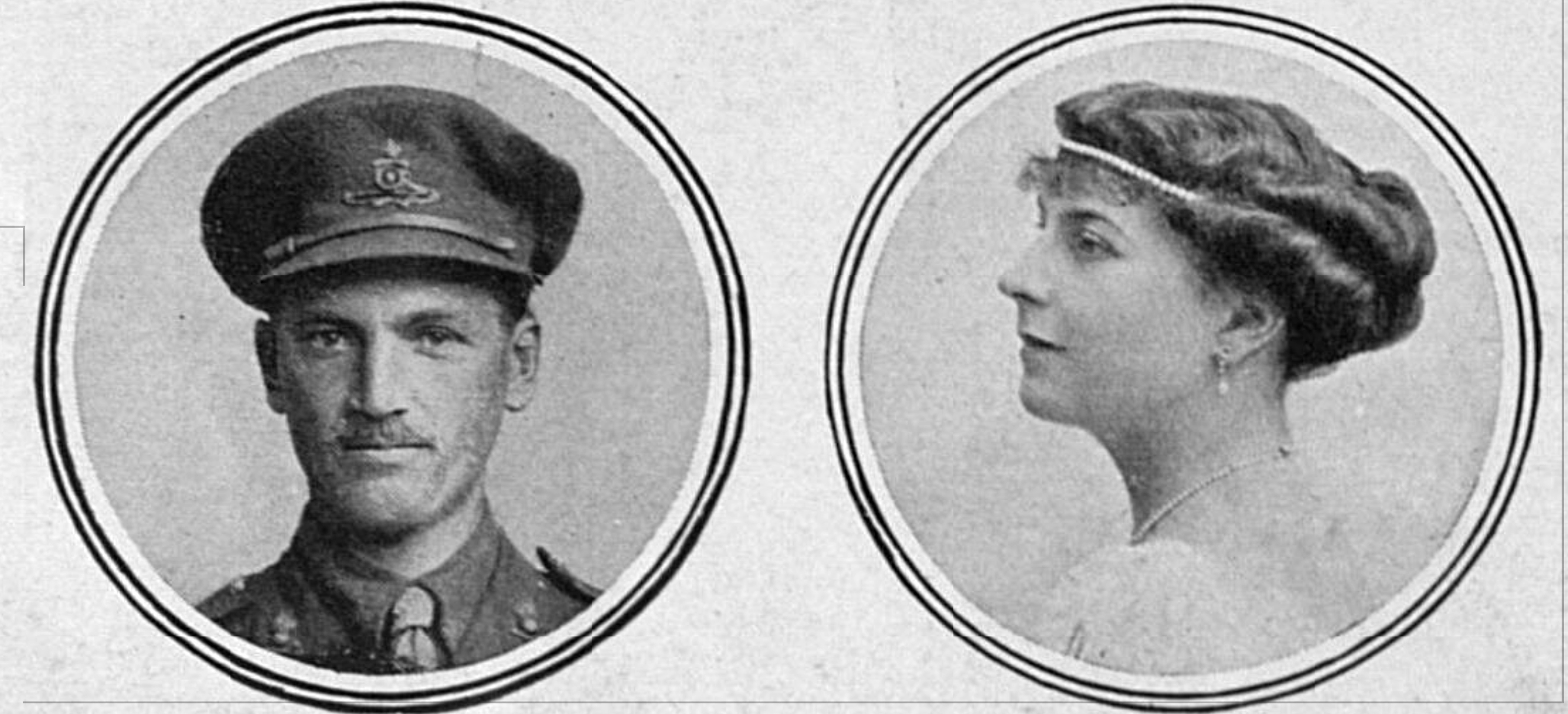
James and Katherine Butchart 1915.

Katharine Eleanora Rivers Fryer (1889-1963) married in 1916 Major James Alexander Butchart (1877-1953). Their wedding was held in St Mary’s Church, Kings Worthy. A description of the ceremony was given in several newspapers. The most detailed outline was in the Hampshire Observer. James died in 1953 and in 1959 Katharine sold Worthy Park House.
