= Ogle baronets =

Extinct baronetcy in the Baronetage of the United Kingdom

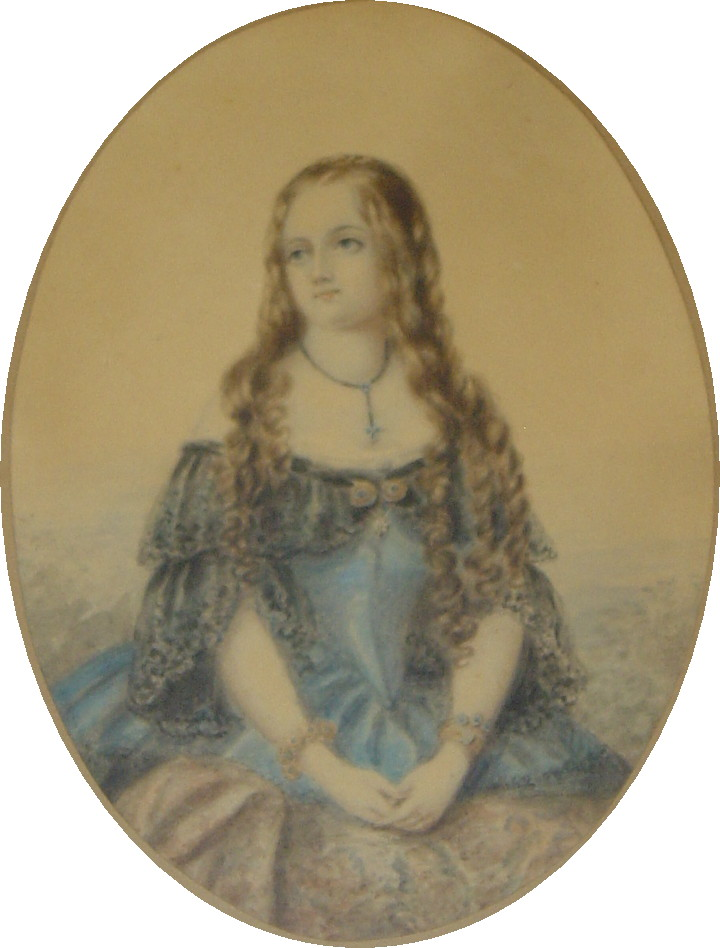
Lady Ogle, designed in Waterloo (Brussels), 1856

The Ogle baronetcy, of Worthy, was a title in the Baronetage of the United Kingdom. It was created on 12 March 1816 for Admiral Chaloner Ogle, of Kings Worthy, Hampshire.

The Admiral belonged to a junior branch of the Ogle family, a prominent Northumberland family from before the time of the Norman Conquest. They settled at Ogle, Northumberland, and in 1341 were granted licence to fortify their manor house, which became known as Ogle Castle. In the 14th and 15th centuries the family included seven medieval Barons (see Baron Ogle). Their estates, including Ogle and Bothal Castle, fell by marriage to the Cavendish family (later Dukes of Portland) on the death of the 7th and last Baron, without male heir in 1597.

== Ogle baronets, of Worthy (1816) ==
- Sir Chaloner Ogle, 1st Baronet (died 1816)
- Sir Charles Ogle, 2nd Baronet (1775–1858)
- Sir Chaloner Ogle, 3rd Baronet (1803–1859)
- Sir Chaloner Roe Majendie Ogle, 4th Baronet (1843–1861)
- Sir William Ogle, 5th Baronet (1823–1885)
- Sir Edmund Ogle, 6th Baronet (1816–1887)
- Sir Henry Asgill Ogle, 7th Baronet (1850–1921)
- Sir Edmund Asgill Ogle, 8th Baronet (1857–1940)

== Arms ==
Coat of arms of Ogle baronets
Crest An heraldic antelope's head Argent maned and horned Or with the same difference as in the arms. Escutcheon Argent, a fess between three crescents Gules. On the fess a crescent on a mullet for difference. Motto Prenez En Gré (Take It in Good Part)

== See also ==
- Baron Ogle

Baronetage of the United Kingdom
Preceded by Brownrigg baronets	Ogle baronets of Worthy; 12 March 1816	Succeeded by Floyd baronets
