= Kirkley Hall =

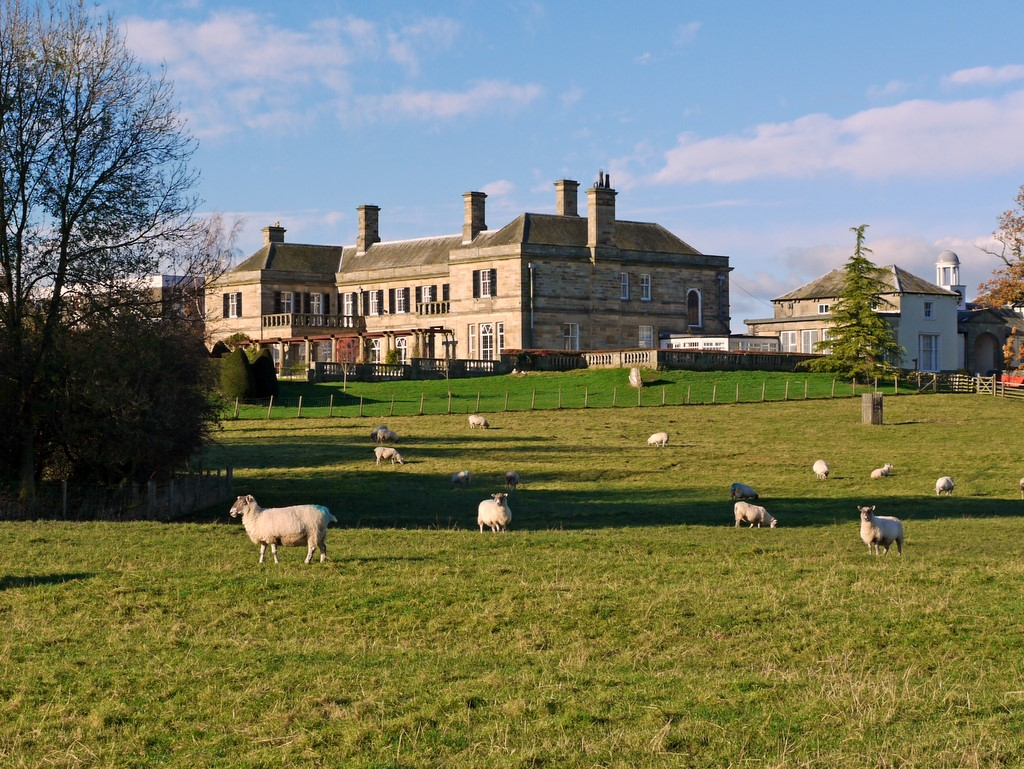
- Kirkley Hall in November 2010

- Location in Northumberland

General information
- Location: Northumberland, England, UK
- Coordinates: 55°05′21″N 1°45′58″W
- OS grid: NZ150773

Design and construction
- Designations

Listed Building – Grade II
- Official name: Kirkley Hall
- Designated: 27 August 1952
- Reference no.: 1156880

Kirkley Hall is a 17th-century historic country mansion and Grade II listed building in Northumberland, England. The estate is over 190 acres (0.77 km^{2}) and adjoins the River Blyth at Kirkley, three miles north of Ponteland in the heart of the Northumberland countryside, which is now a Horticultural, Agricultural & Zoological training centre as part of Northumberland College

== History ==
The manor of Kirkley was granted to the de Eure family in 1267, and Sir William Eure was recorded as in occupation of a tower house there in 1415. In the early 17th century, the manor came into the ownership of the Ogle family, and in 1632 Cuthbert Ogle built a new manor house close to the site of the old house. A stone lintel preserved over a doorway in the present house bears this date, and the initials and arms of Cuthbert Ogle and his wife, Dorothy Fenwick.

Substantial alterations were made to the structure in 1764 by Newton Ogle (1726–1804), Dean of Winchester, who also in 1788 erected an obelisk in the grounds commemorating the accession of William III and Mary II in 1689.

The Reverend John Saville Ogle substantially rebuilt the house in about 1832.

Notable members of the Ogle family connected with Kirkley include Admiral Sir Chaloner Ogle and Sir Chaloner Ogle, 1st Baronet. See also Baron Ogle and Ogle Baronets.

The Ogles disposed of their Kirkley estates in 1922. The Hall was bought by the local shipowner, Sir William Noble (later William Noble, 1st Baron Kirkley). It was damaged by fire in 1929 and rebuilt by him on a somewhat reduced scale from the designs of the architects Robert Burns Dick and Robert MacKellar.

== Features ==
=== Zoological gardens ===
A menagerie opened to the public each weekend, and at other times to school parties. This has been expanded into a tourist attraction in its own right known as Kirkley Hall Zoological Gardens. In 2020, it changed its name to Northumberland College Zoo.

== Usage ==
In 1946, the estate was acquired by the Northumberland County Council, and in 1951 it was established. In 1999, the estate became the land studies campus of Northumberland College in Ashington.

The Hall is available for Corporate and Social events.

Weddings are also performed here because of the attractive surroundings which include ornamental gardens and grounds with all plants labelled, wall-trained fruit trees and greenhouse plants.
