= Northumberland College =

College in Northumberland, England

Coordinates: 55°10′24″N 1°33′28″W

Northumberland College is a further education college based in Ashington, Northumberland, England. The present site opened in 1957, and became the County Technical College in 1961, transformed again in 1987, becoming the Northumberland College of Arts and Technology, and finally settled upon its current status in 1995.

It has 2 main campuses, one in Ashington in the south east of the County and one in Ponteland at Kirkley Hall. It also has a number of satellite, or outreach delivery centres such as in Berwick.

Northumberland College provides further and higher education programmes to school leavers and adult learners in a wide range of subjects, including Early Years and Education; Business and Administration; Housing and Construction Industries; Green Skills; Groundworks; Automotive, Manufacturing and Engineering; English and Maths; Foundation Learning;Hairdressing and Beauty Therapy; Health and Social Care; Hospitality and Catering; Information Technology; Sport and Leisure; Travel and Tourism; Veterinary Nursing; Animal Care and Management: Equine; Conservation; Horticulture; Agriculture; Rural Skills; Agricultural Engineering.

Higher Education degrees are delivered at Ashington and Kirkley Hall campuses.

A wide range of apprenticeships are available in Business Administration, IT, Engineering, Construction, Horticulture, Hospitality, Health and Social Care and Early Years.

Northumberland College merged with Sunderland College and Hartlepool Sixth Form in 2019 to create Education Partnership North East.

Judith Quinn is Campus Principal for Northumberland College Ashington.

Lee Lister is the Campus Principal Northumberland College Kirkley Hall.

The Deputy Chief Executive is Toni Rhodes.

The Chief Finance Officer is David Howells.

The Chief Executive is Ellen Thinnesen.
