= John Thomas (bishop of Winchester) =

English Anglican bishop (1696–1781)

- Bishop of Winchester
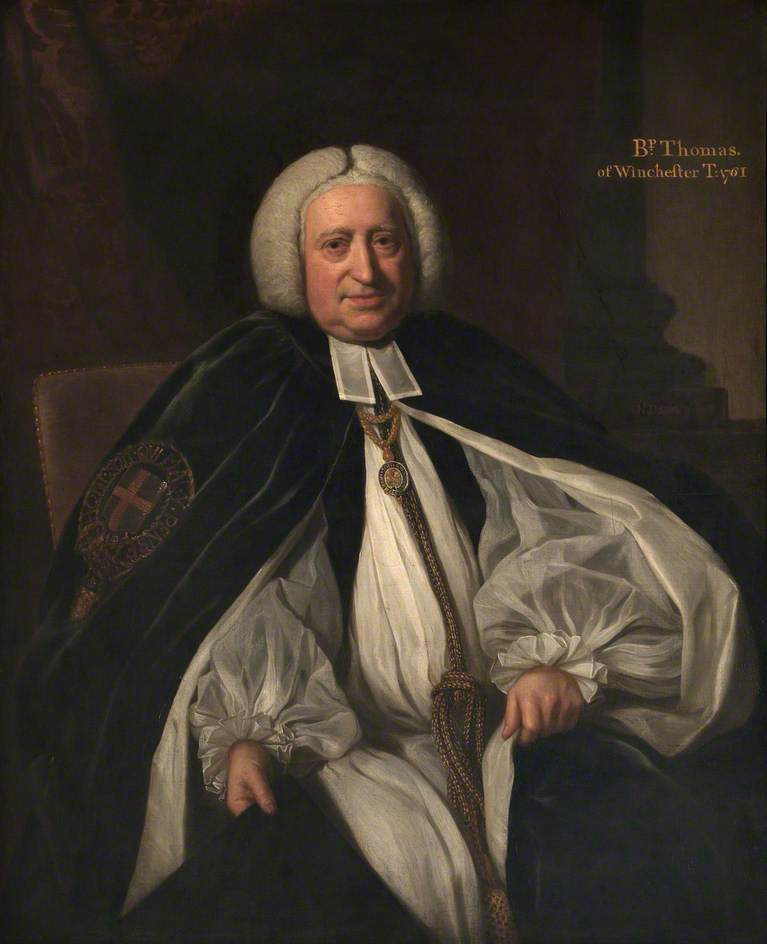
- 1761 portrait by Nathaniel Dance-Holland
- Diocese: Diocese of Winchester
- In office: 1761–1781 (d.)
- Predecessor: Benjamin Hoadly
- Successor: Brownlow North
- Other posts: Bishop of Peterborough (1747–1757); Bishop of Salisbury and Chancellor of the Order of the Garter (1757–1761)

Orders
- Consecration: 4 October 1747

Personal details
- Born: 17 August 1696 Westminster
- Died: 1 May 1781 (aged 84) Winchester House, Chelsea, Middlesex, Great Britain
- Denomination: Anglican
- Education: Christ Church College, Oxford

John Thomas (17 August 1696 – 1 May 1781) was an English Anglican bishop. He became Bishop of Peterborough in 1747, and was made preceptor to the future George, Prince of Wales (later George III) in 1752. In 1757, he became Bishop of Salisbury, and in 1761 Bishop of Winchester.

== Early life, education and early career ==
He was the son of Stremer Thomas, a colonel in the Guards Regiment, born on 17 August 1696 at Westminster, and educated at Charterhouse School. He matriculated into Christ Church, Oxford, on 28 March 1713, and took the degrees of Bachelor of Arts (BA) 1716, Master of Arts (Oxford) (MA Oxon) 1719, Bachelor of Divinity (BD) 1727, and Doctor of Divinity (DD) 1731. In 1720 he was elected a Fellow of All Souls College, Oxford, and, having been disappointed of a living promised to him by a friend of his father, took a curacy in London. Here his preaching attracted attention; in 1731 he was given a prebend in St Paul's Cathedral, and was presented by the dean and chapter in 1733 to the rectory of St Benet and St Peter, Paul's Wharf, which he retained until 1757.

== Rise and first See ==
In 1742 Thomas succeeded to a canonry of St Paul's, and held it until 1748. In 1742 he had been made one of George II's chaplains, and preached the Boyle lectures, which he did not publish; and, having secured the favour of the king when Prince of Wales, he was given the bishopric of Peterborough, and consecrated a bishop at Lambeth Palace on 4 October 1747. He had been elected to that See on 12 September, confirmed 3 October, and was enthroned by proxy on 24 October 1747.

== Later career ==
In 1752 Thomas was selected to succeed Thomas Hayter as preceptor to the young Prince of Wales, later George III, James Waldegrave, 2nd Earl Waldegrave being governor; these appointments were directed against the influence of Princess Augustua, the Dowager Princess of Wales. In 1757 he followed John Gilbert as Bishop of Salisbury (and ex officio Chancellor of the Order of the Garter) and also as clerk of the closet; and in 1761 was translated to Winchester in succession to Benjamin Hoadly. He was elected to the See of Salisbury on 3 June, confirmed 18 June, and enthroned (by proxy) on 4 July 1757; and elected to the See of Winchester on 4 May, confirmed 23 May, and enthroned (by proxy) on 6 June 1761.

== Death and legacy ==
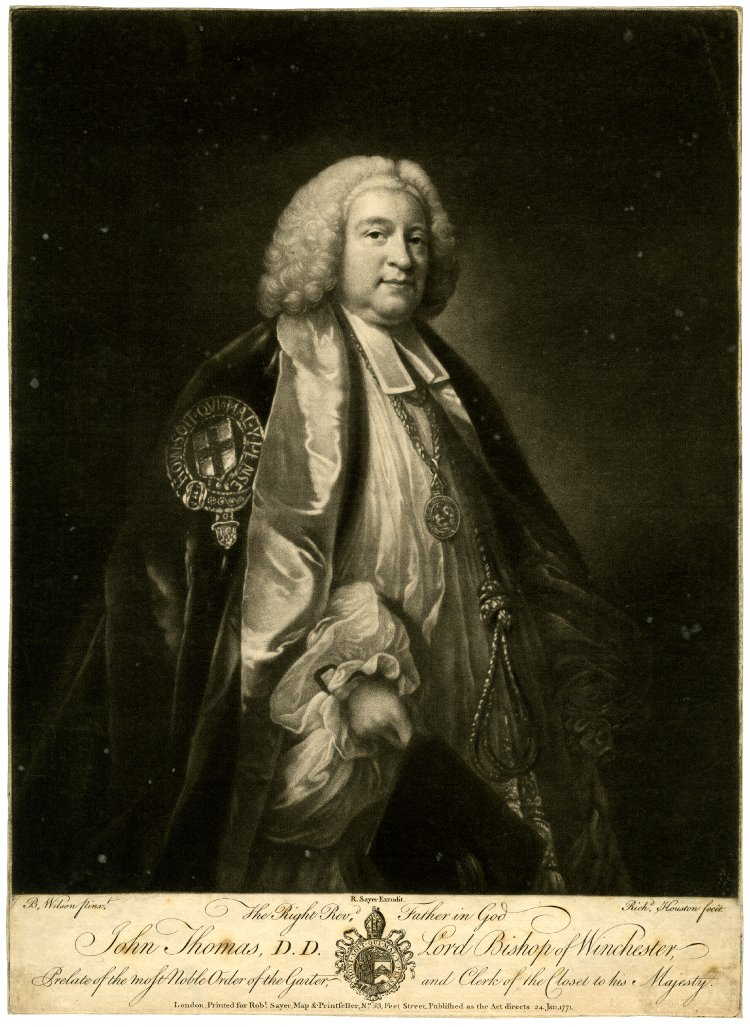
John Thomas, 1771 engraving by Richard Houston after Benjamin Wilson.

Thomas died at Winchester Palace, on 1 May 1781, and was buried in Winchester Cathedral. There are portraits of the bishop at the palaces of Salisbury and Lambeth, and a fine mezzotint engraving (three-quarter length in robes of the Garter) by R. Sayer from a picture by Benjamin Wilson, published on 24 January 1771.

John Thomas published about ten works, mainly sermons.

== Family ==
Thomas married Susan, daughter of Thomas Mulso of Twywell, Northamptonshire; her brother Thomas married the bishop's sister, and their daughter, Mrs. Hester Chapone, spent much of her time after her husband's death with her uncle and aunt at Farnham Castle. Mrs. Thomas died on 19 November 1778, leaving three daughters:

- Susanna Thomas, married Newton Ogle, Dean of Winchester;
- Anne Thomas, married William Buller, Bishop of Exeter;
- Hester Thomas, married Rear Admiral Sir Chaloner Ogle, 1st Baronet.

Church of England titles
Preceded by Robert Clavering	Bishop of Peterborough; 1747–1757	Succeeded by Richard Terrick
Preceded by John Gilbert	Bishop of Salisbury; 1757–1761	Succeeded by Robert Hay Drummond
Preceded by Benjamin Hoadly	Bishop of Winchester; 1761–1781	Succeeded by Brownlow North
