= Bothal Castle =

Grade I listed castle in the United Kingdom

- Northumberland, England, UK
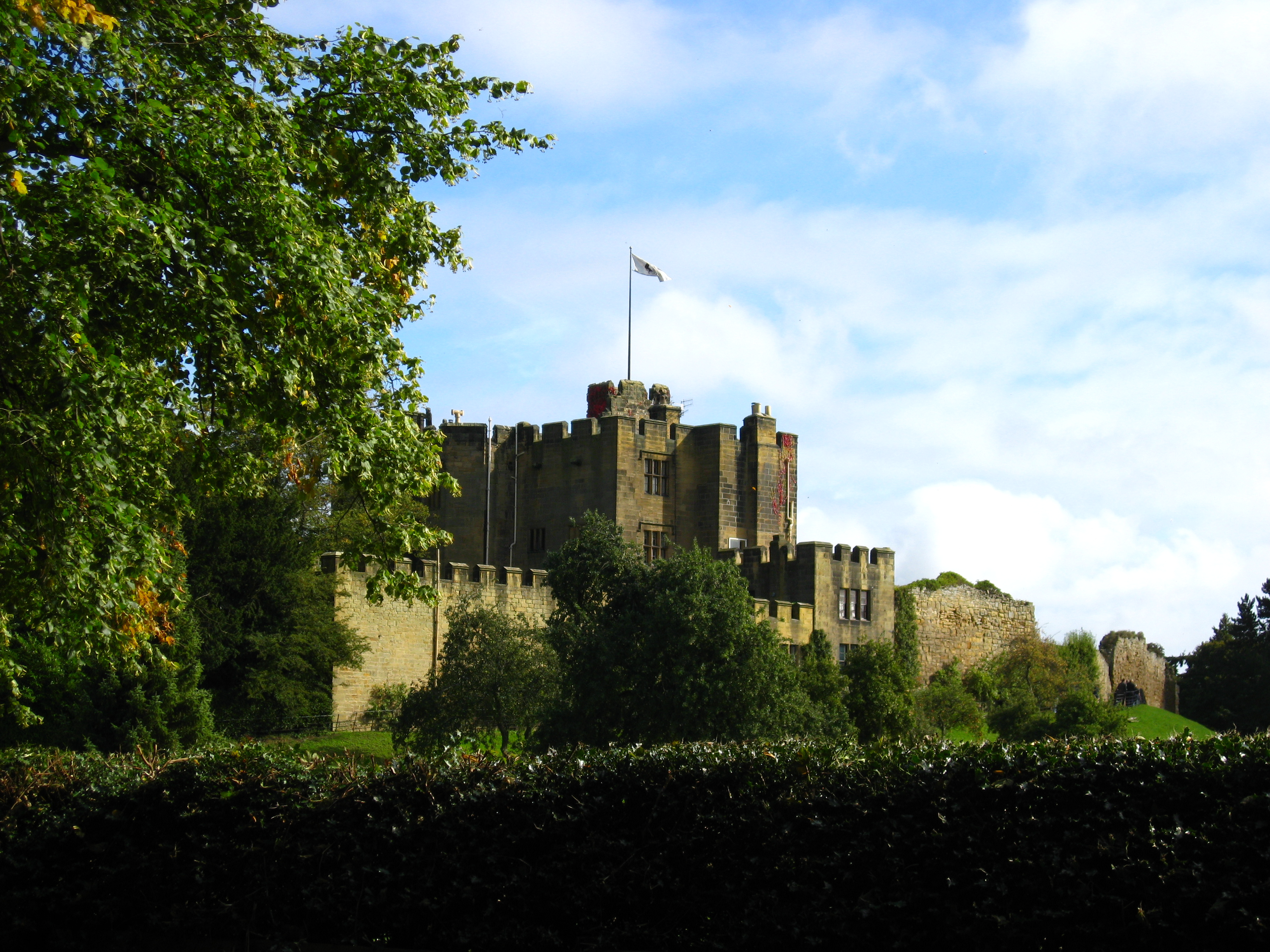

Location
- Location in Northumberland
- Coordinates: 55.173°N 1.625°W
- Grid reference: NZ240866

Bothal Castle is a castle and stately home in the village of the same name near the River Wansbeck, between Morpeth and Ashington in the English county of Northumberland. The word "Bothal" is Old English for a dwelling, and may have referred to a particular dwelling or hall.

== History ==
Bothal was fortified before the Norman Conquest, and renovated and remodelled a number of times. It is a Scheduled Ancient Monument and a Grade I listed building.

In 1095, Bothal was given by King William Rufus to Guy I de Balliol, whose daughter Alice married William Bertram, Baron of Mitford, who probably built a hall house. Several generations later, in 1343, Sir Robert Bertram was given permission to turn his manor house into a castle, including an impressive gatehouse. The gate tower and fragments of curtain wall are medieval, a good deal of which still survive to this day. Through the marriage of Bertram's daughter Hellen to Sir Robert Ogle (d. c.1363), the estate passed to the Ogle family in the 14th century.

After Robert, Lord Ogle, died at Allerton Mauleverer in 1562, an inventory was made listing some of the furnishings at Bothal Castle, including bed hangings, window cloths, and painted cloths which were an alternative to tapestry.

In August 1583 Cuthbert Ogle, 7th Baron Ogle, negotiated a marriage between his daughter Jane and Edward Talbot, a son of George Talbot, 6th Earl of Shrewsbury. Shrewsbury's agents visited Bothal, and described the house as 'a castle battled, and not unlike to Nether Haddon where Master John Manners doth dwell.'

In 1591 the estate passed to the Cavendish-Bentinck family (Dukes of Portland), through the marriage of Catherine, Countess of Ogle to Sir Charles Cavendish of Welbeck. King James visited on 5 May 1617 on his way to Scotland and stayed for two nights.

Restoration was carried out in the 19th century. The building is used as a private residence of the Cavendish-Bentinck family and also houses the Welbeck Estate Office. The castle is in an excellent state of repair and is not accessible for the public.

== Sources ==
- Fry, Plantagenet Somerset, The David & Charles Book of Castles, David & Charles, 1980. ISBN 0-7153-7976-3
