= Newton Ogle =

Newton Ogle (1726–1804) was a Church of England clergyman and member of the landowning Ogle family. The son of Nathaniel Ogle and Elizabeth Newton, he served as a prebendary of Durham Cathedral and from 1769 to 1804 as Dean of Winchester. His wife Susanna Thomas (whom he married in 1757) was daughter of John Thomas, Bishop of Winchester.

In 1762, he inherited Kirkley Hall from his brother Dr Nathaniel Ogle – he bought up most of the land lying between Blagdon Hall and Milbourne Hall and between Ponteland and Morpeth, developed the Hall on its present site, built a new eastern archway, and also added an obelisk nearby to mark the centenary of the Glorious Revolution. On his death in 1804, the Hall was inherited by his sons Nathaniel and the Reverend John Saville Ogle.

His daughter, Hester Jane, married the playwright Richard Brinsley Sheridan in 1795.
