= Ogle app =

Social media application

Ogle (App)
- Headquarters: Mountain View, California
- Industry: Social Media
- Employees: 30
- Website: ogle-app.com
- Launched: 2015
- Current status: Active
- Native clients on: Apple iOS, Android
- Written in: Java, Objective-C

Ogle is a free smartphone based social media application. It is available for iOS and Android. Ogle acts like a school wide forum that lets users and users' classmates share and interact. Users can share photos, videos, questions, even thoughts and watch submissions grow in popularity as other users vote and comment on them.

== App Features ==
- Campus Feed: Interact by watching and posting videos or pictures to your campus story.
- Photos and Videos: share what you want with many different timing options.
- Interact: Chat with friends and groups, or share a moment for all to see.
- Real-name system: choose to register an account with username and profile picture.
- Custom Stickers: Create stickers to add creativity and zest to your pictures.
- Flash Interaction: All private chat and group chat history will be deleted after 24 hours on Ogle Chat.

== Controversies ==
Users can post anything on Ogle using text, photos, and videos. As a result, some Ogle user's sense of anonymity, posts have targeted specific schools and students with abusive and hurtful content. The Ogle app's user anonymity makes it difficult for school officials to quickly investigate issues that occur within the Ogle app.

On March 28, 2016, three people were arrested after violent threats were made against an Anaheim high school. 18-year-old Miguel Meza was arrested Sunday afternoon during a traffic stop, along with his passenger, 23-year-old Johnny Aguilar. Police said both men had loaded handguns. Aguilar was also accused of violating his probation. "It is concerning the fact that they did have firearms, but we don't have a crystal ball. We can't determine if they possessed those firearms to engage in some kind of school violence or if they had it for another reason," Sgt. Daron Wyatt with the Anaheim Police Department said. Officials said Meza and Aguilar have known gang ties and detectives began investigating Meza after threats were made against the school on Ogle.

On February 29, 2016, Santa Cruz County sheriff's deputies arrested a 16-year-old Aptos High School student Friday, accused of making an online threat of gun violence at Aptos High and Monte Vista Christian."He basically told detectives that it was all a joke. It's not a joke. You have multiple resources being spent to investigate these cases," said Santa Cruz County Sheriff's Sgt. Roy Morales. The schools remained open throughout the week, with a huge police presence on campus.

In an anonymous emailed statement to the Daily Pilot on Thursday, the "Ogle team" said: "We are aware of the concern, and cyberbullying is absolutely NOT our intention for the app. Our goal for this app is to create a free and safe community space for students, for a better communication. We are currently working around the clock to improve the app. As a matter of fact, we are also in contact with local police departments, anti-bullying organizations and local high schools to try to help the students." In response to these incidents, Ogle expressed that they takes the safety of its users seriously and does not condone any type of behavior that is illegal or in violation of its content policies. The company also said it has instituted a content moderation team to increase review and identify and remove inappropriate content, and take action against “those who violate our community guidelines.”

== See also ==
- Whisper
- Nearby
- Skout
- Yik Yak
