= Baron Ogle =

English hereditary title in abeyance

Ogle Medieval coat of arms

Baron Ogle is an abeyant title in the Peerage of England. It was created in 1461 for Robert Ogle. It fell into abeyance in 1691. The Ogles were a prominent Northumbrian family from before the time of the Norman Conquest. They settled at Ogle, Northumberland and in 1341 were granted a licence to fortify their manor house which became known as Ogle Castle. The family included seven Medieval Barons. Their estates fell by marriage to the Cavendish family (later Dukes of Newcastle) following the death of the 7th Baron in 1597.

Later junior branches of the family owned estates at Causey Park, Eglingham Hall and Kirkley Hall (see Ogle family) and provided eight Baronets (see Ogle Baronets)

== Baron Ogle (1461) ==
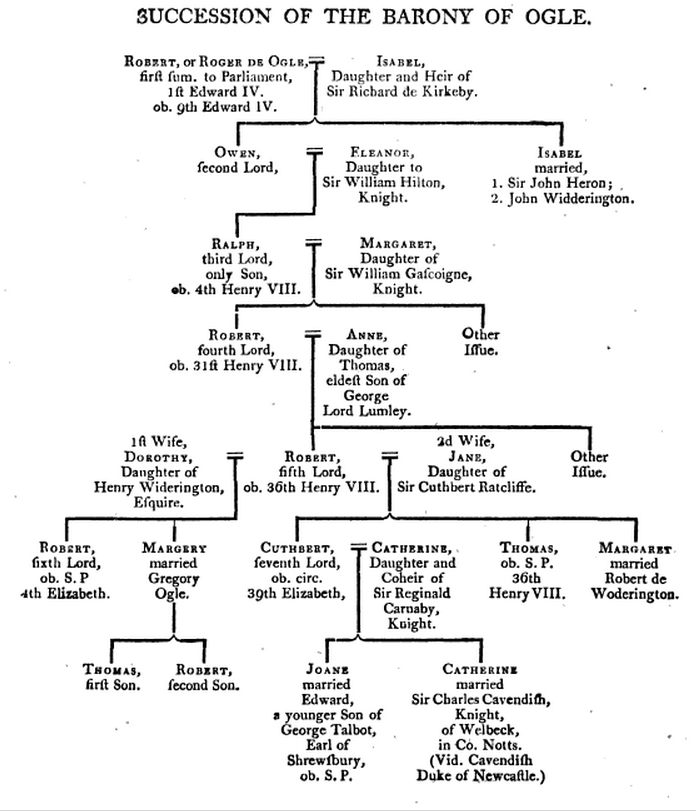

- Robert Ogle, 1st Baron Ogle (1406–1469)
- Owen (Ewyn) Ogle, 2nd Baron Ogle (1440–1486)
- Ralph Ogle, 3rd Baron Ogle (1468–1513)
- Robert Ogle, 4th Baron Ogle (1490–1530)
- Robert Ogle, 5th Baron Ogle (1513/1527–1545)
- Robert Ogle, 6th Baron Ogle (1529–1562)
- Cuthbert Ogle, 7th Baron Ogle (about 1540–1597) (in abeyance 1597–03 Dec 1628)
- Catherine Ogle, 8th Baroness Ogle (1568/69/1570–1629), who married Charles Cavendish (1553–1617).
- William Cavendish, 1st Duke of Newcastle (1592–1676)
- Henry Cavendish, 2nd Duke of Newcastle (1630–1691) (in abeyance since 1691)

== Today's co-heirs to the barony ==
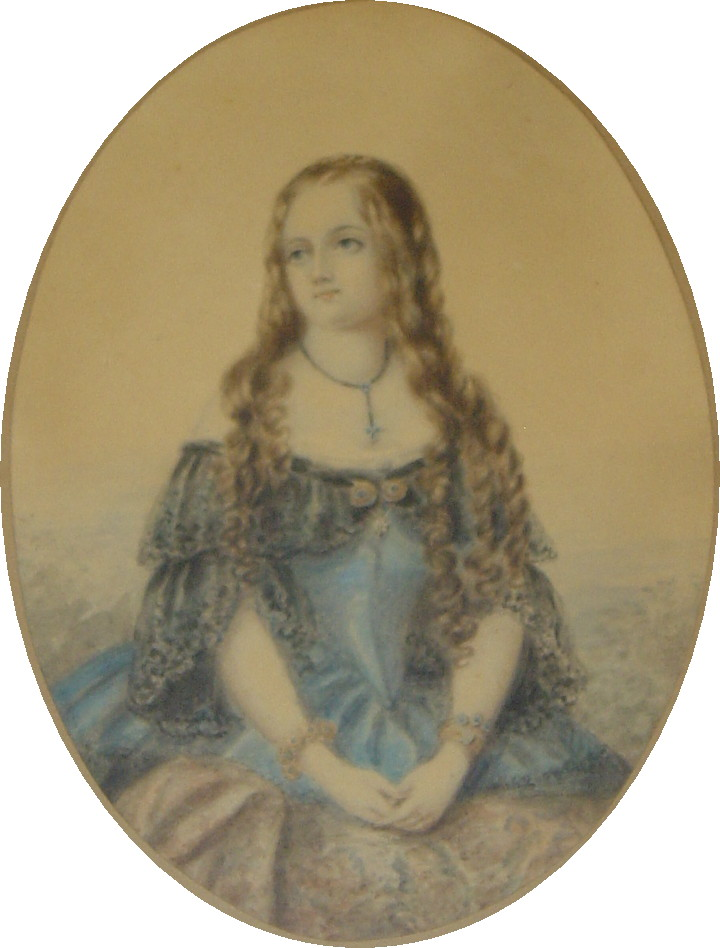
Lady Ogle, designed in Waterloo, 1856.

- The four daughters of the late Lord Howard de Walden and Seaford (heirs of the last baron's daughter Lady Margaret):
  - Hazel Czernin, 10th Baroness Howard de Walden (1/12)
  - Susan Buchan (1/12)
  - Jessica White (1/12)
  - Camilla Acloque (1/12)
- The heirs of the last baron's daughter Lady Catherine (Countess of Thanet):
  - Robert Gascoyne-Cecil, 7th Marquess of Salisbury (1/9)
  - John Russell, 27th Baron de Clifford (1/18)
  - Rufus Keppel, 10th Earl of Albemarle (1/18)
  - Charles Leveson-Gower (descendant of Rear-Admiral John Leveson Gower) (1/9)
- The heirs of the last baron's daughter Lady Arabella (Lady Spencer):
  - Daphne Meade (1/12)
  - Jane Corsellis (1/12)
  - William Sackville, 11th Earl De La Warr (1/6)
- Family tree from the first settlers in Tennessee U.S.A.
