= Sir Chaloner Ogle, 1st Baronet =

Royal Navy officer (1726–1816)

Admiral Sir Chaloner Ogle Bt
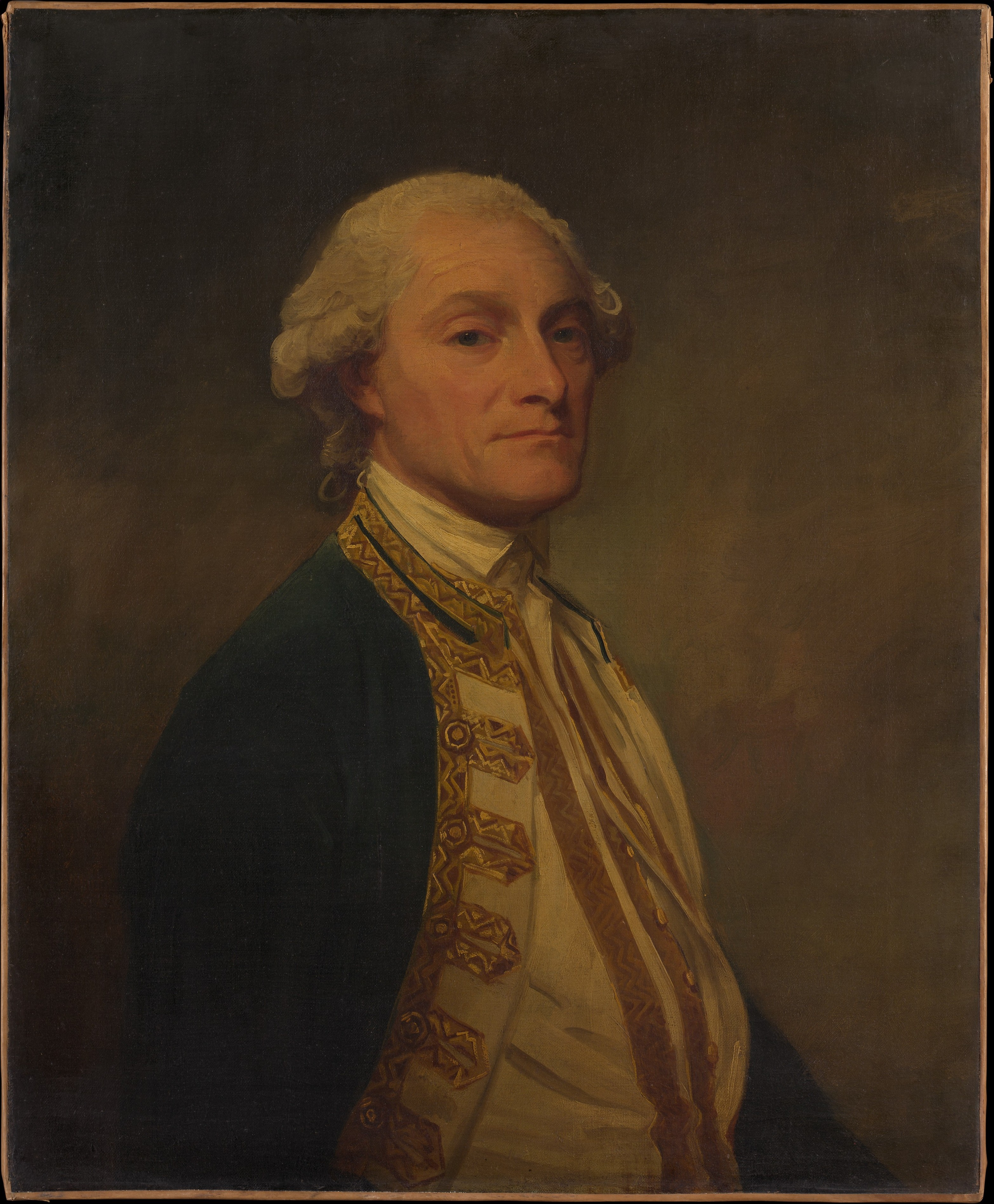
- 1782 portrait of Ogle by George Romney
- Born: 1726
- Died: 27 August 1816 (aged 89–90); Worthy Park House, Hampshire
- Relatives: Sir Charles Ogle, 2nd Baronet (son); Chaloner Ogle (cousin)
- Military career
- Allegiance: Great Britain; United Kingdom
- Branch: Royal Navy
- Service years: 1745–1816
- Rank: Admiral of the Red
- Commands: HMS Chesterfield; HMS Yarmouth; HMS Aquilon; HMS Elizabeth; HMS Resolution
- Conflicts: Seven Years' War; American War of Independence; Action of 8 January 1780; Battle of Cape St. Vincent (1780); French Revolutionary Wars; Napoleonic Wars

Admiral of the Red Sir Chaloner Ogle, 1st Baronet (1726 – 27 August 1816) was a Royal Navy officer who served in the Seven Years' War, American War of Independence and French Revolutionary and Napoleonic Wars.

== Early life ==
Ogle was born in 1726 into the prominent Ogle family. He was the son of Elizabeth Newton and Dr. Nathaniel Ogle of Kirkley Hall, Northumberland, who served as Physician of the Forces, under the 1st Duke of Marlborough. Among his siblings were the Very Reverend Newton Ogle, Dean of Winchester, and sister Isabella Ogle, who married their cousin, and Ogle's namesake, Admiral Sir Chaloner Ogle, and (after his death, James King, 4th Baron Kingston.

His paternal grandfather was Ralph Ogle and his maternal grandfather was Jonathan Newton, a Barrister in Newcastle upon Tyne.

== Career ==
As a naval officer he was commissioned a lieutenant on 19 November 1745 and then promoted to captain on 30 June 1756. He served as captain of HMS Chesterfield, HMS Yarmouth and then HMS Aquilon during the Seven Years' War. He took a number of valuable prizes during his cruises, and received a knighthood in 1768. From 1770 he commanded the 74-gun HMS Elizabeth during the Falklands Crisis, and then the 74-gun HMS Resolution from 1774. He served under Admiral Sir George Rodney at the relief of Gibraltar in January 1780, the action of 8 January 1780 and the Battle of Cape St. Vincent. He was promoted to Rear-Admiral of the Blue on 26 September 1780, Vice-Admiral of the Blue on 24 September 1787, Vice-Admiral of the Red on 1 February 1793, Admiral of the Blue on 12 April 1794 and Admiral of the Red in 1805.

In 1773 he acquired the Manor of Kings Worthy, Hampshire and on 12 March 1816 was created 1st Baronet of Worthy in the Baronetage of the United Kingdom.

== Personal life ==
On 7 September 1761, Ogle married Hester Thomas at Bremhill, Wiltshire. She was the daughter of Susan Muslo and John Thomas, Bishop of Winchester. His brother Newton married her sister Susanna. Together, they were the parents of:

- Arabella Ogle (1762–1855), who married Hon. Edward Bouverie, son of William Bouverie, 1st Earl of Radnor, in 1785. After his death, she married Hon. Robert Talbot, son of Col. Richard Talbot and Margaret O'Reilly, 1st Baroness Talbot of Malahide, in 1828.
- Barberina Ogle (1768–1854), who married Valentine H. Wilmot before 1819. After his death, she married Thomas Brand, 20th Baron Dacre, son of Thomas Brand and Gertrude Brand, 19th Baroness Dacre, in 1819.
- Jemima Sophia Ogle (1770–1819), who married Gen. Sir Charles Asgill, 2nd Baronet, son of Sir Charles Asgill, 1st Baronet, in 1790.
- Sir Charles Ogle, 2nd Baronet (1775–1858), also an Admiral; he married Charlotte Margaret Gage, daughter of Gen. Hon. Thomas Gage and Margaret Kemble, in 1802. After her death, he married Letitia Burroughs, daughter of Sir William Burroughs, 1st Baronet, in 1820. After her death, he married Mary Anne (née Cary), daughter of George Cary of Torrey Abbey and widow of Sir John Hayford Thorold, 10th Baronet, in 1834.
- Thomas Ogle (1776–1801), a Major who fought during the landing at Abu Qir Bay in the Battle of Alexandria in 1801 and was killed in action.
- James Ogle (1778–1833), a Reverend who married Elizabeth Poulter, daughter of Rev. Edmund Poulter, the prebendary of Winchester, in 1807. Her brother, John Sayer Poulter, was MP for Shaftesbury.

Sir Chaonler died at his seat at Worthy on 27 August 1816. He was succeeded in the Baronetcy by his son, Charles.

=== Descendants ===
Through his daughter Barbarina, he was a grandfather of author Arabella (née Wilmot) Sullivan (1796–1839), who married Rev. Frederick Sullivan (fourth son of Sir Richard Sullivan, 1st Baronet), Vicar of Kimpton, Hertfordshire, parents of Barbarina Grey, Lady Grey and Sir Francis Sullivan, 6th Baronet.

Through his son Charles, he was a grandfather of Captain Sir Chaloner Ogle, 3rd Baronet (1803–1859), who married Eliza Sophia Frances Roe, parents of Sir Chaloner Roe Majendie Ogle, 4th Baronet (1843–1861), who died unmarried at age 18 and was succeeded in the baronetcy by his younger half-brother Sir William Ogle, 5th Baronet (1823–1885), who "had been an invalid from his cradle".

Through his youngest son James, he was a grandfather of Gen. Sir Edmund Ogle, 6th Baronet, colonel-commandant in the Royal Engineers, who married Catherine St Hill and was the father of the last two baronets, Sir Henry Asgill Ogle, 7th Baronet and Sir Edmund Asgill Ogle, 8th Baronet, neither of whom married, thus rendering the baronetcy extinct upon the 8th baronet's death in San Remo, Italy in 1940.

== Portraits ==
Confusion has arisen over another portrait, held at the National Maritime Museum at Greenwich, but this is now known to be a flag officer, previously thought to be Sir Chaloner Ogle. Another portrait of Sir Chaloner Ogle of Worthy by a follower of Joshua Reynolds was sold at Christie's auction house in 2009, which bears the same likeness to the painting in the National Maritime Museum.

Baronetage of the United Kingdom
New creation	Baronet (of Worthy); 1812–1816	Succeeded by Charles Ogle
