= Causey Park Bridge =

Hamlet in Northumberland, England

Coordinates: 55.244°N 1.711°W

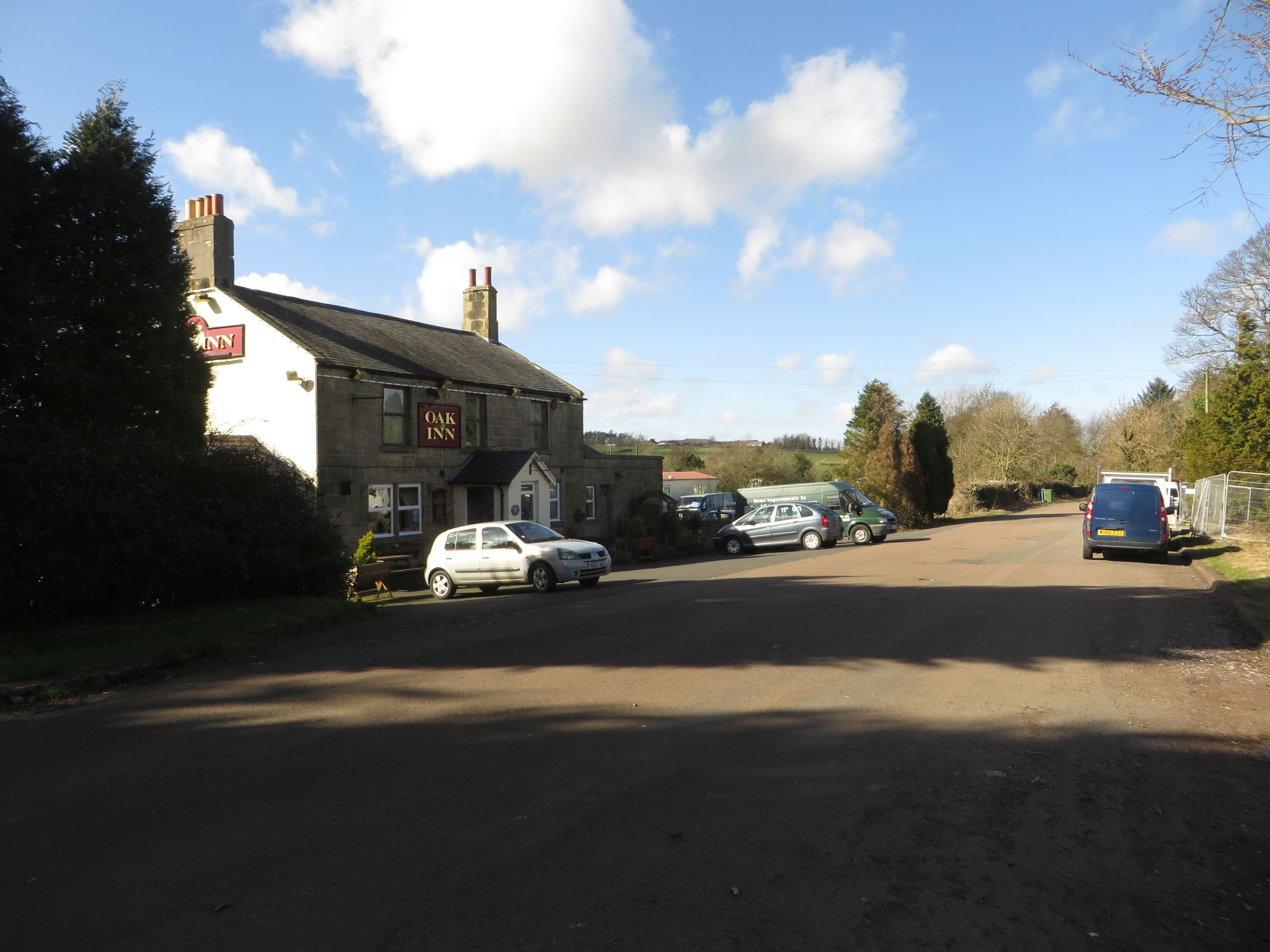

- Location within Northumberland
- OS grid reference: NZ185945
- Civil parish: Tritlington and West Chevington
- Unitary authority: Northumberland
- Ceremonial county: Northumberland
- Region: North East
- Country: England
- Sovereign state: United Kingdom
- Post town: MORPETH
- Postcode district: NE61
- Dialling code: 01670
- Police: Northumbria
- Fire: Northumberland
- Ambulance: North East
- UK Parliament: Berwick-upon-Tweed

Causey Park Bridge is a hamlet in the civil parish of Tritlington and West Chevington, in Northumberland, England. It is about 6 miles (10 km) to the north of Morpeth and a similar distance inland from the North Sea coast.

== Governance ==
Causey Park Bridge is in the parliamentary constituency of North Northumberland.
