= Robert Ogle, 1st Baron Ogle =

Sir Robert Ogle, 1st Baron Ogle (1413–1469), was son and namesake of Sir Robert (V) Ogle of Ogle (c.1370–1436) and his wife Maud, purported daughter of John Grey, 1st Earl of Tankerville.

== Family ==
Through his Grey relations he had connections with the House of York, as his uncle Thomas Grey was executed as a result of the Southampton Plot in 1415, and his cousin, another Thomas Grey, married the earl of Cambridge's daughter; Cambridge had also suffered the same fate for his involvement in the plot against King Henry V. His family came from Northumberland, where his father had been constable of Norham Castle, Sheriff of the honour, and its MP. He had died in 1436, at which point Robert Ogle (VI) entered into his inheritance.

== Royal service ==
Ogle's career as a servant of the crown began prior to his father's death. In 1434, he was a commissioner of the Truce with Scotland, and a year later appears to have been captain of Berwick Castle, which was worth circa £194 in peace time, with another £200 to be paid in time of war. It was in which post he was captured by the Scots, during a border raid, and ransomed for 750 marks. As the king traditionally paid the ransoms of those captured on his service, Ogle applied for such; but the condition of the Lancastrian crown's finances at the time were such that he was still trying to get this compensation seven years later. He was later (1437–38) appointed Sheriff of Northumberland.

== Political career ==
When the political factionalism between Richard of York and the Duke of Somerset spilled over into physical violence in 1455, he supported the House of York. This was probably due to the fact that he was a retainer of York's close ally Richard, Earl of Salisbury and brought a force of 600 men from the Scottish Marches to York's army at the First Battle of St Albans. He was also, however, constable of the Bishopric of Durham, and, as the then-Bishop of Durham was Salisbury's brother, he probably also came with the bishop's "blessing... as his contribution to the Neville family cause." With these men, one contemporary chronicler, stated, he personally 'tok the market place.' His support for the Yorkists continued throughout the Wars of the Roses, and after the Battle of Towton, with Sir John Conyers he hunted the deposed king, Henry, and besieged him at Carham Castle.

== Elevation to the peerage and service to the new regime ==
He was created Baron Ogle on 26 July 1461, having been "the principal Northumbrian gentleman to support the Yorkist cause." He was further placed in command of the Earl of Northumberland's forfeited castles- Alnwick, Warkworth, and Prudhoe. He also received in 1438 the earl's position of Warden of the Eastern March. He continued his diplomatic work on the border, completing, in October 1461, a further year's truce with Scotland. In 1465, with the elevation of Warwick's brother Montague to the earldom of Northumberland, the Percy estates that Ogle had received were transferred to Montague; Ogle was compensated with the Lordship of Redesdale and Harbottle Castle and other forfeited lands in Northumberland. He was a regular, if partisan, member of the King's Bench commissions in Northumberland, being regularly appointed by the Nevilles, first Salisbury, then Warwick.

Ogle died on 1 November 1469. At some point, he had married one Isabel Kirkby of Kirkby, Lancashire, producing a daughter and three sons. He was succeeded by his eldest son, Owen (Ewyn) Ogle, 2nd Baron Ogle.

Peerage of England
New creation	Baron Ogle; 1461–1469	Succeeded by Owen Ogle
