= Ogle Castle =

Manor house in Whalton, Northumberland, England

Coordinates: 55.1052°N 1.7821°W

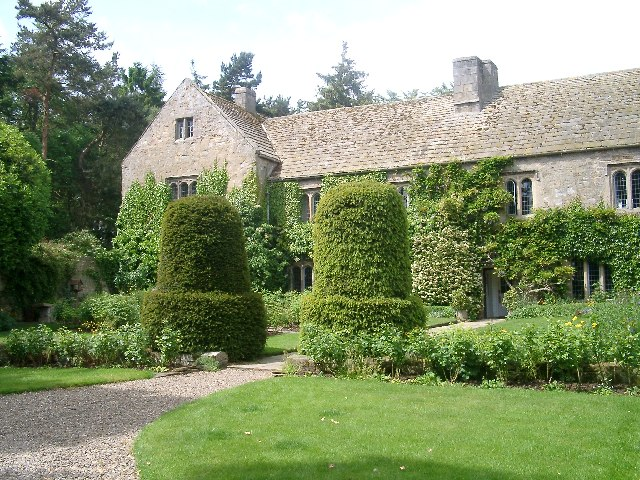
Ogle House to-day

Ogle Castle (grid reference NZ14057908) is a former fortified manor house at Ogle, near Whalton, Northumberland. It is a Scheduled Ancient Monument and a Grade I listed building.

== Middle Ages ==
After the Norman Conquest in 1066, Humphrey de Hoggell was granted rights over the manor of Ogle. Northumberland was then a border county and in 1341, Sir Robert Ogle was allowed a licence to crenellate or fortify the manor; in 1346, David II of Scotland was held prisoner here after his capture at the Battle of Neville's Cross.

== 17th century ==
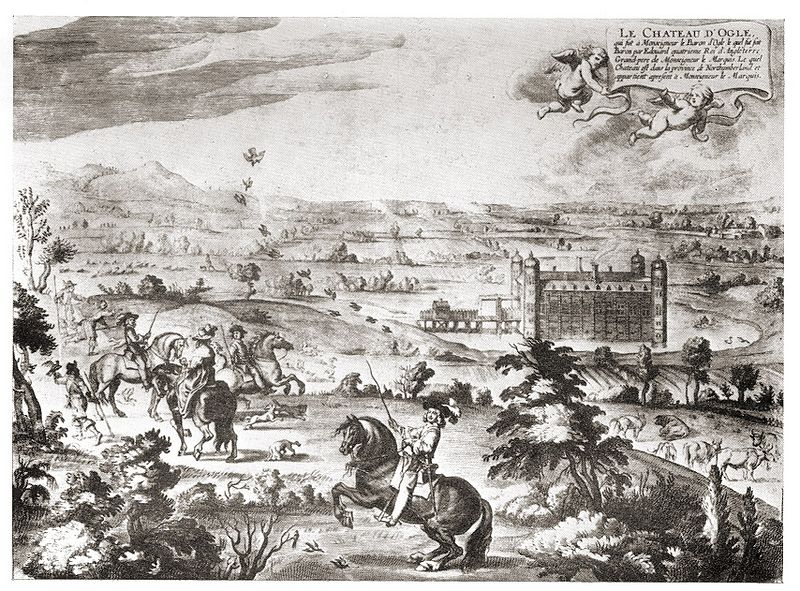
Ogle Castle in the 17th century

The last direct descendant in the senior line, Catherine Ogle (c. 1568–1629), married Sir Charles Cavendish and after her death, the manor passed to their son, William Cavendish, later 1st Duke of Newcastle. Cavendish was the senior Royalist in the North during the 1642–1646 First English Civil War and spent much of his fortune raising troops for Charles I; after defeat at Marston Moor in 1644, he went into exile in Europe, returning only after the 1660 Restoration.

Parliament sold Ogle Castle in 1653 to James Moseley, who repaired some of the damage done during the civil wars but the original house was extensively rebuilt after it was returned to William in 1660. The modern building largely dates from that period, retaining only the mediaeval tower house and its projecting latrine, as well as showing parts of a double moat on the western and northern sides.

== 19th century ==
In the early 19th century, an East Indiaman named Ogle Castle was wrecked on the Goodwin Sands on 3 November 1825, with the loss of over 100 crew members and passengers.
