= Arabella Sullivan =

British author

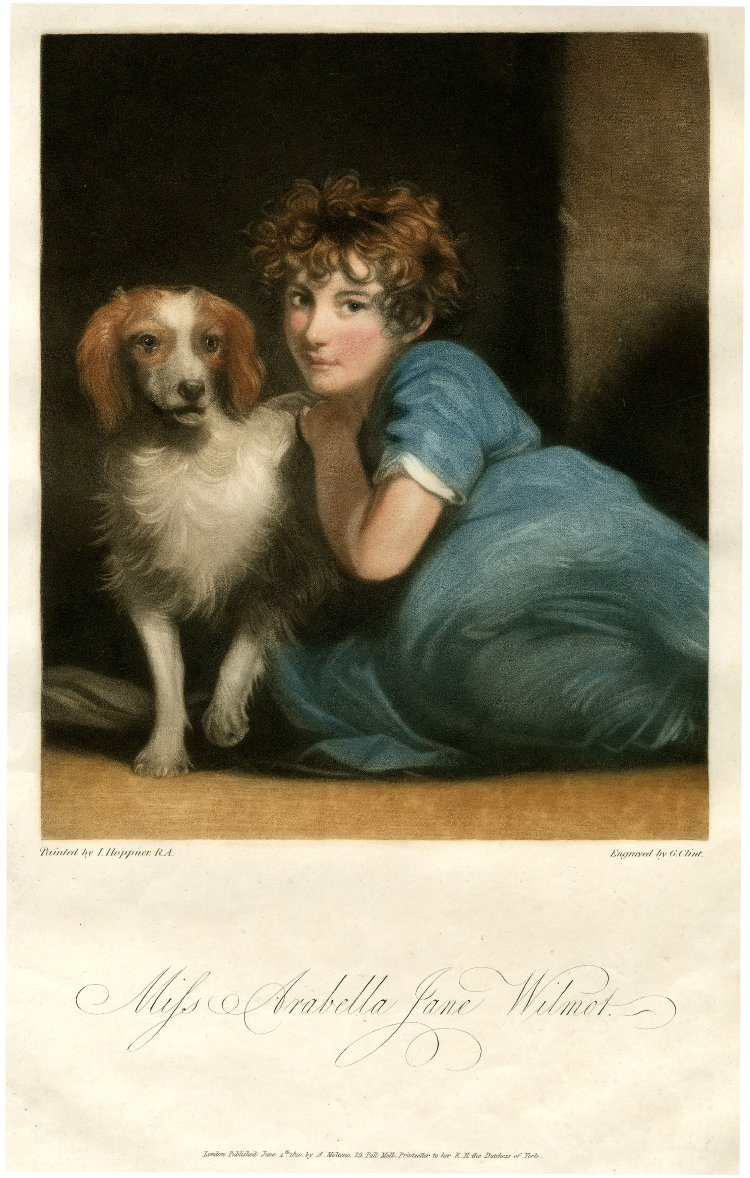
Portrait of Arabella Sullivan (1810), aged 13–14

Arabella Jane Sullivan (née Wilmot; 1 May 1796 – 27 January 1839) was a British writer.

== Biography ==
Arabella Jane Wilmot was born on the 1 May 1796 in Great Britain to Valentine Henry Wilmot (c. 1764–1819), an officer in the Foot Guards, and Barbarina Wilmot (née Ogle; later Barbarina Brand, Lady Dacre), a poet, playwright and translator. On 20 June 1796 Sullivan was baptised at St Marylebone Parish Church.

She wrote Recollections of a Chaperon (1831) and Tales of the Peerage and Peasantry (1835), both collections of stories credited to her mother, but were written by her and only edited by her mother.

== Personal life ==
On 3 January 1821, Sullivan married The Rev Frederick Sullivan, a cricketer and vicar of Kimpton, Hertfordshire.

Sullivan had three children, including the writer Barbarina Charlotte, Lady Grey and Sir Francis Sullivan, 6th Baronet, a Royal Navy officer. Sullivan was the daughter-in-law of Sir Richard Sullivan, 1st Baronet, and the mother-in-law of Sir Frederick Grey.

On 1 March 1839, Sullivan died in Hertfordshire.
