= Barbarina Brand =

English poet, playwright, and translator

The Right Honourable The Lady Dacre
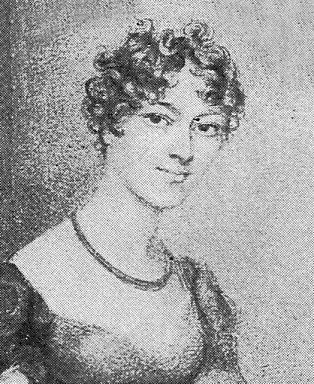
- Born: Barbarina Ogle; 9 May 1767; Kingdom of Great Britain
- Died: 17 May 1854 (aged 87); Chesterfield Street, London
- Other name: Barbarina Wilmot
- Occupations: Poet; playwright; translator
- Spouse(s): Valentine Henry Wilmot (m. 1789; died 1819) Thomas Brand, 20th Baron Dacre (m. 1819; died 1851)
- Children: Arabella Sullivan
- Father: Sir Chaloner Ogle, 1st Baronet
- Relatives: Barbarina Charlotte, Lady Grey (granddaughter); Sir Francis Sullivan, 6th Baronet (grandson); Frederick Sullivan (son-in-law); Sir Charles Ogle, 2nd Baronet (brother); Sir Charles Asgill, 2nd Baronet (brother-in-law); Newton Ogle (uncle); William Buller (uncle); James King, 4th Baron Kingston (uncle); Chaloner Ogle (uncle); Hester Chapone (cousin); John Thomas, Bishop of Winchester (grandfather)
- Family: Ogle family

Barbarina Brand, Baroness Dacre (née Ogle; 9 May 1767 – 17 May 1854), was an English poet, playwright, and translator. Brand maintained an extensive correspondence with a circle of other literary women, including Joanna Baillie, Mary Russell Mitford, and Catherine Maria Fanshawe.

== Early life and education ==
Barbarina Ogle was born on 9 May 1767 in the Kingdom of Great Britain to Admiral Sir Chaloner Ogle, 1st Baronet and Hester Ogle (née Thomas). Through her mother Brand was the granddaughter of John Thomas, Bishop of Winchester.

Brand's brother was Admiral Sir Charles Ogle, 2nd Baronet. Through her sister Sophia Asgill, Brand was the sister-in-law of Sir Charles Asgill, 2nd Baronet.

Brand was educated at home, with an emphasis on French and Italian.

== Career ==
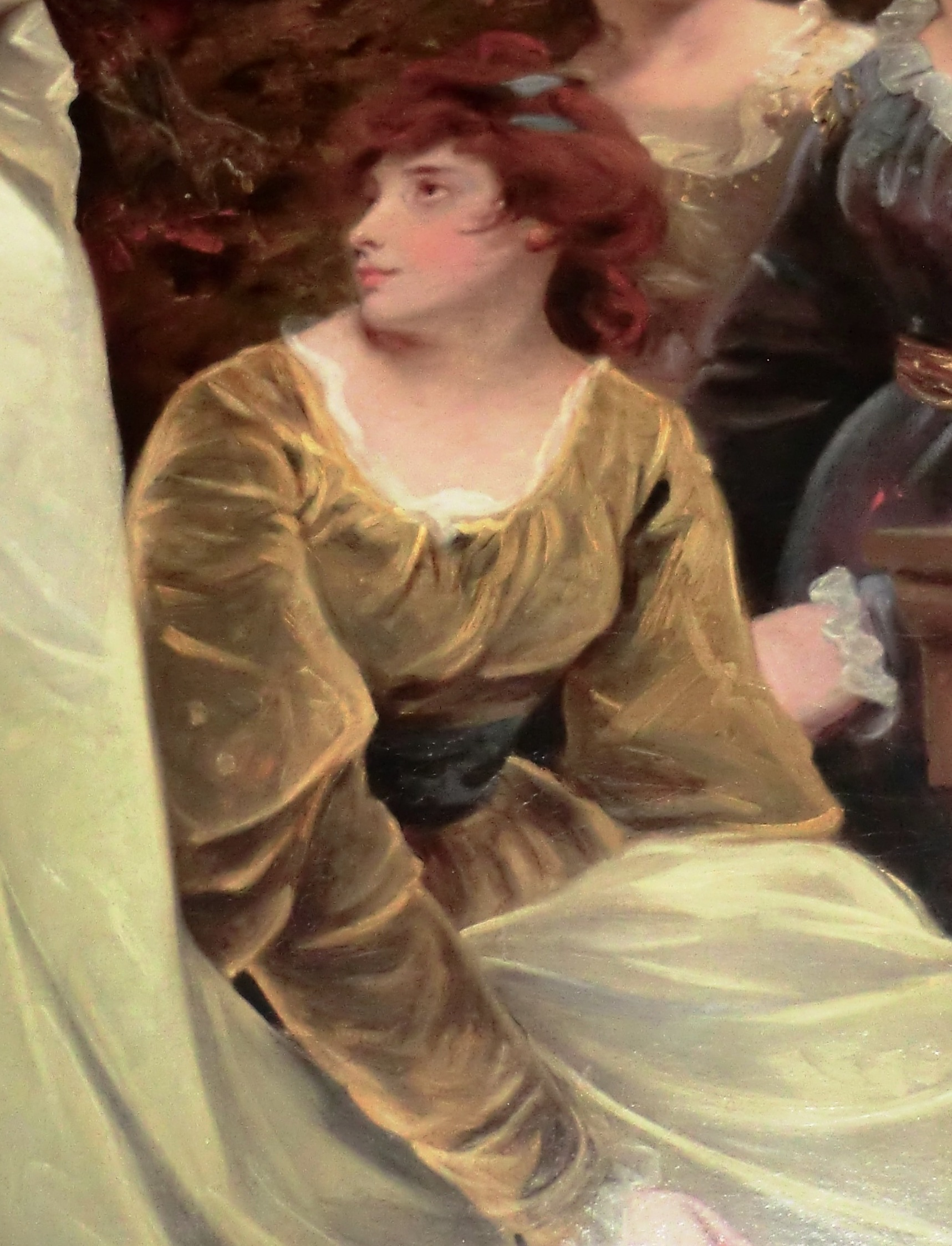
This detail from a 1791 portrait of the Duchess of York by John Hoppner shows Asgill's wife Sophia sitting at her feet. Lady Asgill was Lady of the Bedchamber to the Duchess, and was godmother to Hoppner's granddaughter, Helen Clarence.

In 1821, her poetical works were printed, but not published, in two volumes octavo, under the title of Dramas, Translations, and Occasional Poems. Some of these were dated in the 18th century. They included four dramas, the first of which, Gonzalvo of Cordova, was written in 1810. In the character of the great captain, the author followed the novel of Jean-Pierre Claris de Florian. The next, Pedrarias, a tragic drama, was written in May 1811; and its story was derived from Les Incas of Jean-François Marmontel. Her third dramatic work was Ina, a tragedy in five acts, the plot of which was laid in Saxon times in England. It was produced at Drury Lane on the 22 April 1815, under the management of Richard Brinsley Sheridan, to whose second wife, the daughter of Dr. Ogle, Dean of Winchester, the author was related. It was not sufficiently successful to induce its repetition, for in the Times of the 24 April 1815, was printer: "The second representation of the new tragedy called Ina is postponed till further notice, at the express desire of the authoress." It was printed in 1815 as produced on the stage; but in Lady Dacre's collected works, she restored "the original catastrophe, and some other parts which had been cut out." A fourth drama bore the title of Xarifa. It was remarked in the Quarterly Review, No. xcvii. that her, "Dramas, both tragic and comic, have been much and greatly admired." Lady Dacre's book contained also several translations of the sonnets of Petrarch, some of which seemed to have been privately printed at an earlier date. In 1823, when Ugo Foscolo produced his Essays on Petrarch, he dedicated the volume to Lady Dacre. The last 45 pages of Foscolo's book were occupied by Lady Dacre's translations from Petrarch.

Brand was the editor for Arabella Sullivan's Recollections of a Chaperon (1831) and Tales of the Peerage and Peasantry (1838).

Brand was also an wax sculptor, specialising in modelling horses.

== Personal life ==
Brand had hearing loss. In 1789, Brand married Valentine Henry Wilmot (c. 1764–1819), an Officer in the guards, but later separated. Brand and Wilmot had one daughter, the writer Arabella Sullivan. Following her separation from Wilmot, Brand moved to Hampton Court with her daughter.

Through her daughter, Brand was the mother-in-law of The Rev Frederick Sullivan, a reverend and cricketer, and the grandmother of Barbarina Charlotte, Lady Grey, a writer, and Sir Francis Sullivan, 6th Baronet, a Royal Navy Officer.

On 4 December 1819, Brand married Thomas Brand, 20th Baron Dacre.

Brand died on the 17 May 1854 in Chesterfield Street, Mayfair, Westminster, London aged 87.

== Selected works ==
- Dramas, Translations, and Occasional Poems (2 vols., privately printed in 1821), including

- Gonzalvo of Cordova (1810, based on de Florian's Gonzalve de Cordone [1791])
- Pedarias, a Tragic Drama (1811, based on Marmontel's Les Incas)
- Ina, a tragedy in five acts (produced at Drury Lane in 1815 under Sheridan; printed the same year)
- Xarifa (drama)

- Forty-five pages of her translated sonnets were published in Ugo Foscolo's Essays on Petrarch (1823)
- Editor, Recollections of a Chaperon by Arabella Sullivan (short stories, 1831)
- Editor, Tales of the Peerage and Peasantry by Arabella Sullivan (short stories, 1835)
- Translations from the Italian (privately printed in 1836)
