= Frederick Grey =

Royal Navy Admiral (1805–1878)

Admiral The Honourable Sir Frederick Grey GCB
- Born: 23 August 1805; Howick, Northumberland
- Died: 2 May 1878 (aged 72); Sunningdale, Berkshire
- Military career
- Allegiance: United Kingdom
- Branch: Royal Navy
- Service years: 1819–1866
- Rank: Admiral
- Commands: HMS Actaeon; HMS Jupiter; HMS Endymion; HMS Hannibal; Cape of Good Hope Station
- Conflicts: First Opium War; Crimean War
- Awards: Knight Grand Cross of the Order of the Bath

Admiral Sir Frederick William Grey GCB (23 August 1805 – 2 May 1878) was a Royal Navy officer. As a captain he saw action in the First Opium War and was deployed as principal agent of transports during the Crimean War. He became First Naval Lord in the Second Palmerston ministry in June 1861 and subsequently published a pamphlet Admiralty Administration, 1861–1866 describing his reforms which included, inter alia, the notion that all senior naval promotions and appointments should be non-political and should be discussed and agreed by the Naval Members of the Admiralty Board on a collective basis before recommendations were made to the First Lord of the Admiralty.

== Early career ==
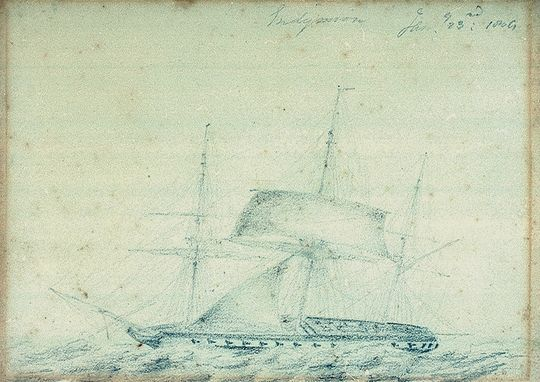
The fifth-rate HMS Endymion which Grey commanded during the First Opium War

Born the son of Charles Grey, 2nd Earl Grey (who served as prime minister in the 1830s), and Mary Elizabeth Ponsonby (daughter of William Ponsonby, 1st Baron Ponsonby), Grey joined the Royal Navy in January 1819. He initially joined the fifth-rate HMS Naiad in the Mediterranean Fleet as a midshipman and saw action against pirates off Cap Bon in Tunisia in 1824. Promoted to lieutenant on 7 April 1825, he transferred to the fifth-rate HMS Sybille in the Mediterranean Fleet that month and then to the sixth-rate HMS Volage on the South America Station in September 1825. Promoted to commander on 17 April 1827, he was posted to the sloop HMS Heron on the South America Station that same month.

Promoted to captain on 19 April 1828, Grey was given command successively of the sixth-rate HMS Actaeon in the Mediterranean Fleet in November 1830, of the fourth-rate HMS Jupiter on the East Indies and China Station in August 1835 and then of the fifth-rate HMS Endymion also on the East Indies and China Station in October 1840. In HMS Endymion he saw action in the First Opium War and was appointed a Companion of the Order of the Bath on 24 December 1842.

Grey took command of the second-rate HMS Hannibal in March 1854 and conveyed 10,000 French troops to Åland off Finland before proceeding to the Bosphorus where he was deployed as principal agent of transports during the Crimean War.

== Senior command ==
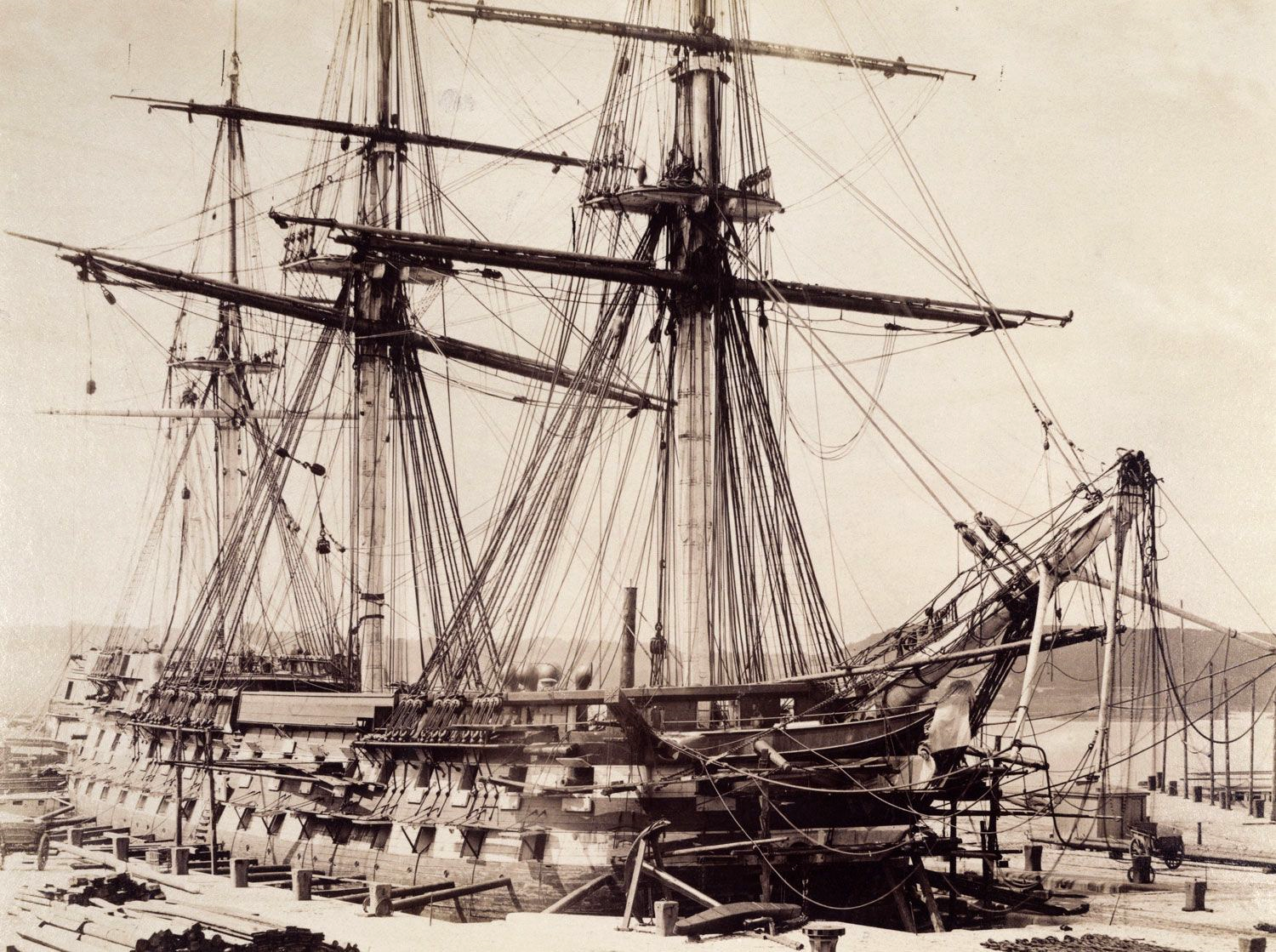
The second-rate HMS Hannibal which Grey commanded during the Crimean War

Promoted to rear-admiral on 22 January 1855, and having been advanced to Knight Commander of the Order of the Bath on 2 January 1857, Grey became Commander-in-Chief, Cape of Good Hope & West Coast of Africa Station, hoisting his flag in the third-rate HMS Boscawen, in April 1857.

Promoted to vice-admiral on 5 August 1861, Grey became First Naval Lord in the Second Palmerston ministry in June 1861. In this role he did not seek a seat as a Member of Parliament and instead sought to make the role professional rather than political. He published a pamphlet Admiralty Administration, 1861–1866 describing his reforms which included, inter alia, the notion that all senior naval promotions and appointments should be non-political and should be discussed and agreed by the Naval Members of the Admiralty Board on a collective basis before recommendations were made to the First Lord of the Admiralty. Having been promoted to full admiral on 24 April 1865 and advanced to Knight Grand Cross of the Order of the Bath on 28 March 1865, he resigned his post when the second Russell ministry fell from power in July 1866.

Grey lived at Lynwood House in Sunningdale in Berkshire and died there on 2 May 1878.

== Family ==
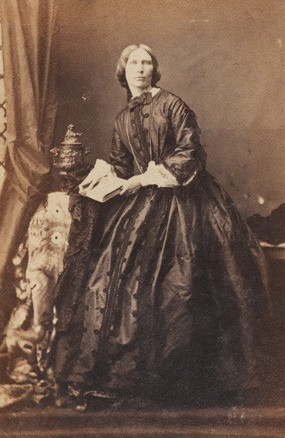
Barbarina Charlotte (née Sullivan), Lady Grey, 1861, by Camille Silvy

He married, in 1846, Barbarina Charlotte Sullivan, daughter of Rev. Frederick Sullivan and Arabella Wilmont, and sister of Admiral Sir Francis Sullivan, 6th Baronet. They had no issue. Lady Grey died at her residence Fairmile House, Cobham, on 23 March 1902.

Military offices
Preceded by Vacant	Commander-in-Chief, Cape of Good Hope Station; 1857–1860	Succeeded by Sir Henry Keppel
Preceded by Sir Richard Dundas	First Naval Lord; 1861–1866	Succeeded by Sir Alexander Milne
