= Barbarina Charlotte, Lady Grey =

English novelist (1823–1902)

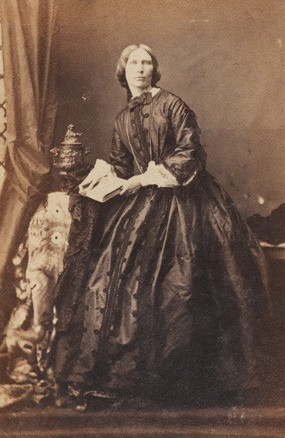
- portrait by Camille Silvy
- Born: 26 June 1823; London
- Died: 23 March 1902
- Occupation: Novelist
- Spouse: Frederick Grey
- Parents: Frederick Sullivan (father); Arabella Sullivan (mother)

Barbarina Charlotte, Lady Grey (26 June 1823 – 23 March 1902) was an English novelist.

She was born Barbarina Charlotte Sullivan on 26 June 1823 in London, the daughter and second child of the Reverend Frederick Sullivan and author Arabella Sullivan, herself the daughter of the author Barbarina Brand, Lady Dacre.

In 1846, she married Admiral Sir Frederick William Grey. In 1857 he became Commander-in-Chief, Cape of Good Hope & West Coast of Africa Station. Her letters from South Africa were published as My Dear Maria: The Cape Letters and Journal of Barbarina Charlotte, Lady Grey, 1857-1860 in 1977.

Grey published three books, A Man without a Name (1852), a novel, Better Never than Late (1883), a collection of short stories for children, and with her niece Gertrude Lyster, the posthumously published A Family Chronicle (1908), which mostly focused on the lives of her mother and grandmother.

Barbarina Grey died at her residence Fairmile House, Cobham, on 23 March 1902.

== Bibliography ==
1. A Man without a Name. 2 vol. London: Bentley, 1852.
2. Better Never than Late and Other Stories. 1 vol. London: Hatchard, 1883.
3. (Harington, Andrew L. editor) My Dear Maria: The Cape Letters and Journal of Barbarina Charlotte, Lady Grey, 1857-1860. Cape Town: Friends of the South African Library, 1997.
4. (Lyster, Gertrude, editor) A Family Chronicle: Derived from Notes and Letters Selected by Barbarina, The Hon. Lady Grey. London, 1908.
