= List of works by Geoffrey Webb =

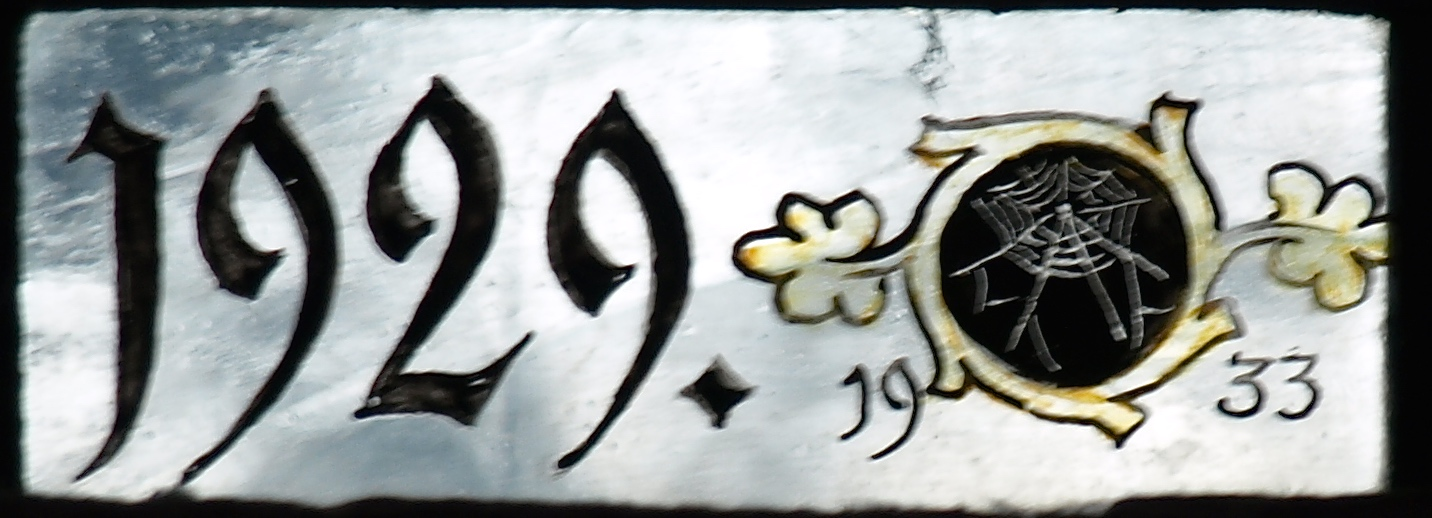
Webb's maker's mark, from a window in Holy Trinity Church, Coventry, West Midlands

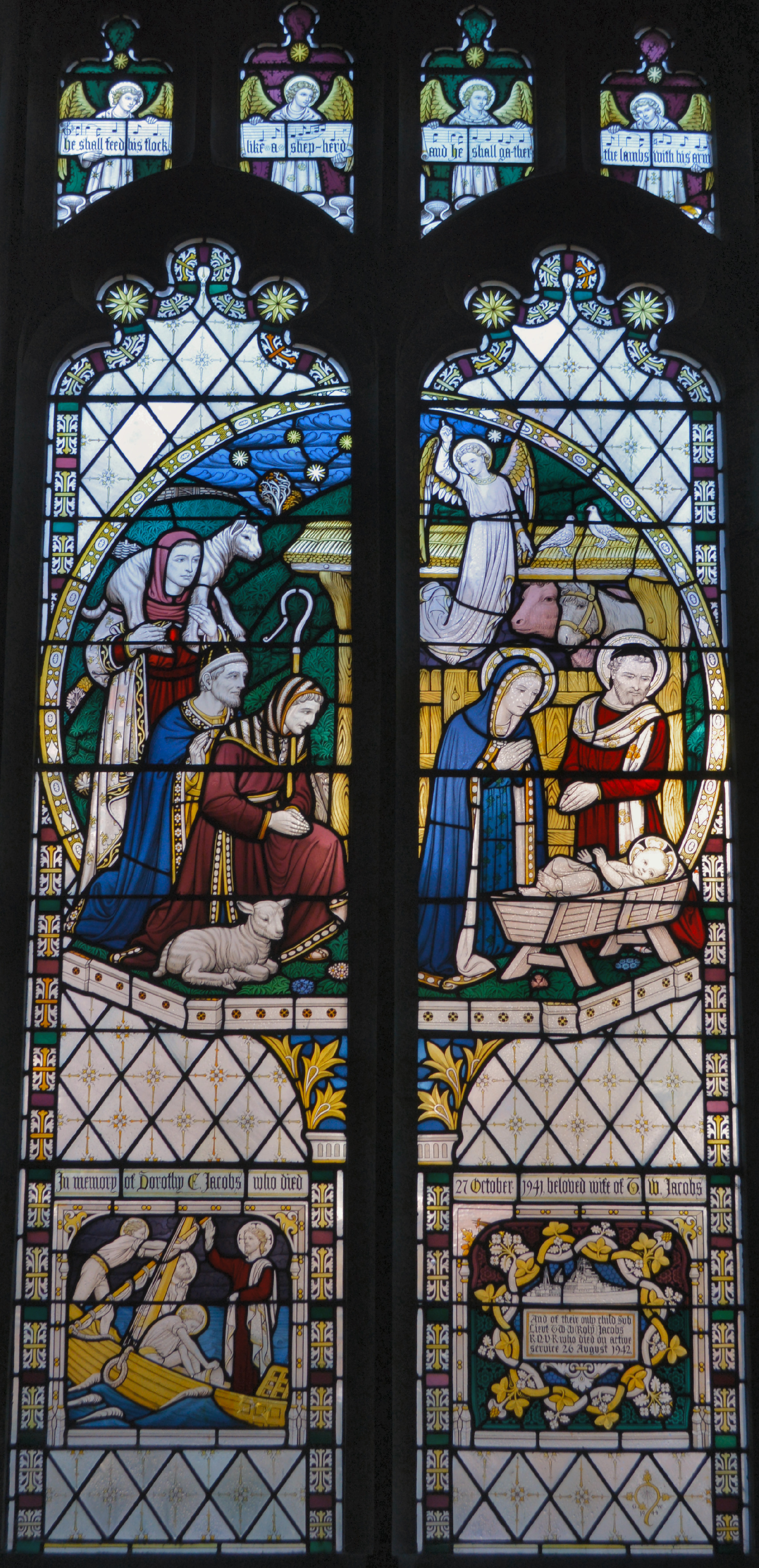
The Nativity window in St Nicholas' Church, Thames Ditton, Surrey

The following is a list of the extant works of Geoffrey Fuller Webb (1879–1954), an English stained-glass artist and designer of church furnishings, based for most of his career in East Grinstead. He was a pupil of Charles Eamer Kempe and Sir Ninian Comper. His work, which draws on the Gothic Revival tradition, can be found in both Church of England and Roman Catholic churches, and in several cathedrals. His stained glass was most commonly commissioned by churches in southern England and the Midlands. It can be identified by his artistic signature, a spider's web, usually placed near the bottom right corner of the window.

== Works ==
This list does not include works of restoration by Geoffrey Webb, nor works of his that have been destroyed.

=== England ===
Berkshire

- Reading, St James's Church. Furnishings of the Lady Chapel (1953).
- Upper Woolhampton, Douai Abbey. East window of the refectory (1949). Incorporates stained glass from French and Flemish churches destroyed in the First World War.
  Abbot's throne.
  High altar of the Abbey Church.
  Ceiling bosses in the older part of the Abbey Church.

Bristol

- Stapleton, Holy Trinity Church. Second south aisle window (1929).

Buckinghamshire

- Beaconsfield, St Teresa's Church. Reredos in the English Martyrs Chapel (1939).
- Bledlow Ridge, St Paul's Church. Second north nave window (1926). Subject: St Michael.

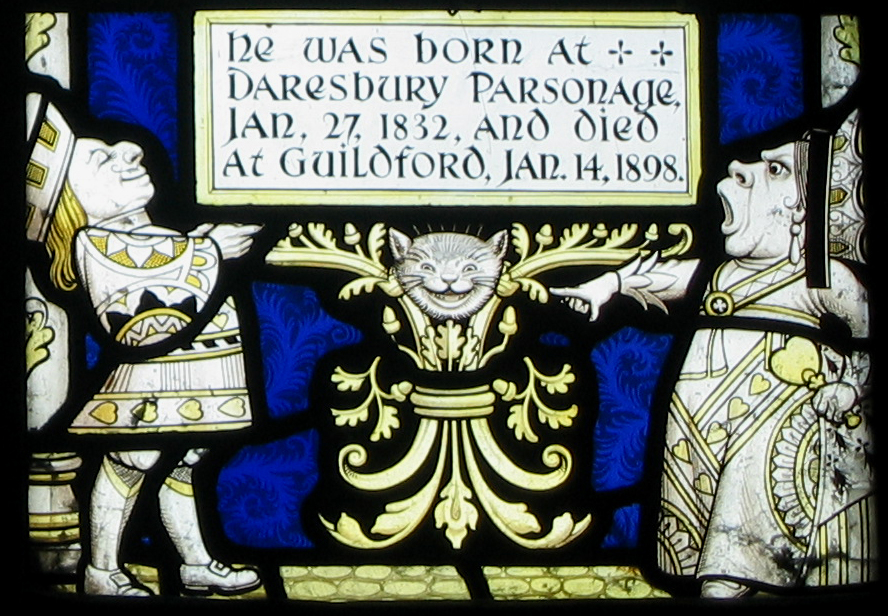
Detail of the Lewis Carroll Memorial Window in All Saints' Church, Daresbury, Cheshire

Cambridgeshire

- Coveney, St Peter ad Vincula Church. East window, three lights (1937). Subject: Christ's commission to St Peter.
- Littleport, St George's Church. East window.
- Witcham. St Martin's Church. East window, three lights (1946). Subject: Christ in Majesty, St Martin as a soldier and St Martin as a beggar.

Cheshire

- Daresbury, All Saints' Church, Daniell Chapel. The Lewis Carroll Memorial Window (1935). Subject: the Nativity of Jesus witnessed by Lewis Carroll and Alice; above: scenes emblematic of Carroll's life; below: scenes from the Alice books, based on the illustrations by John Tenniel.

Derbyshire

- Denby, St Mary's Church. South aisle window (1950).
- Eyam, St Lawrence's Church. West window of the south aisle (1911).

Dorset

- Sturminster Newton, St Mary's Church. First north aisle window, three lights (1911). Subject: The Crucifixion of Christ, with St Martin and the beggar.

County Durham

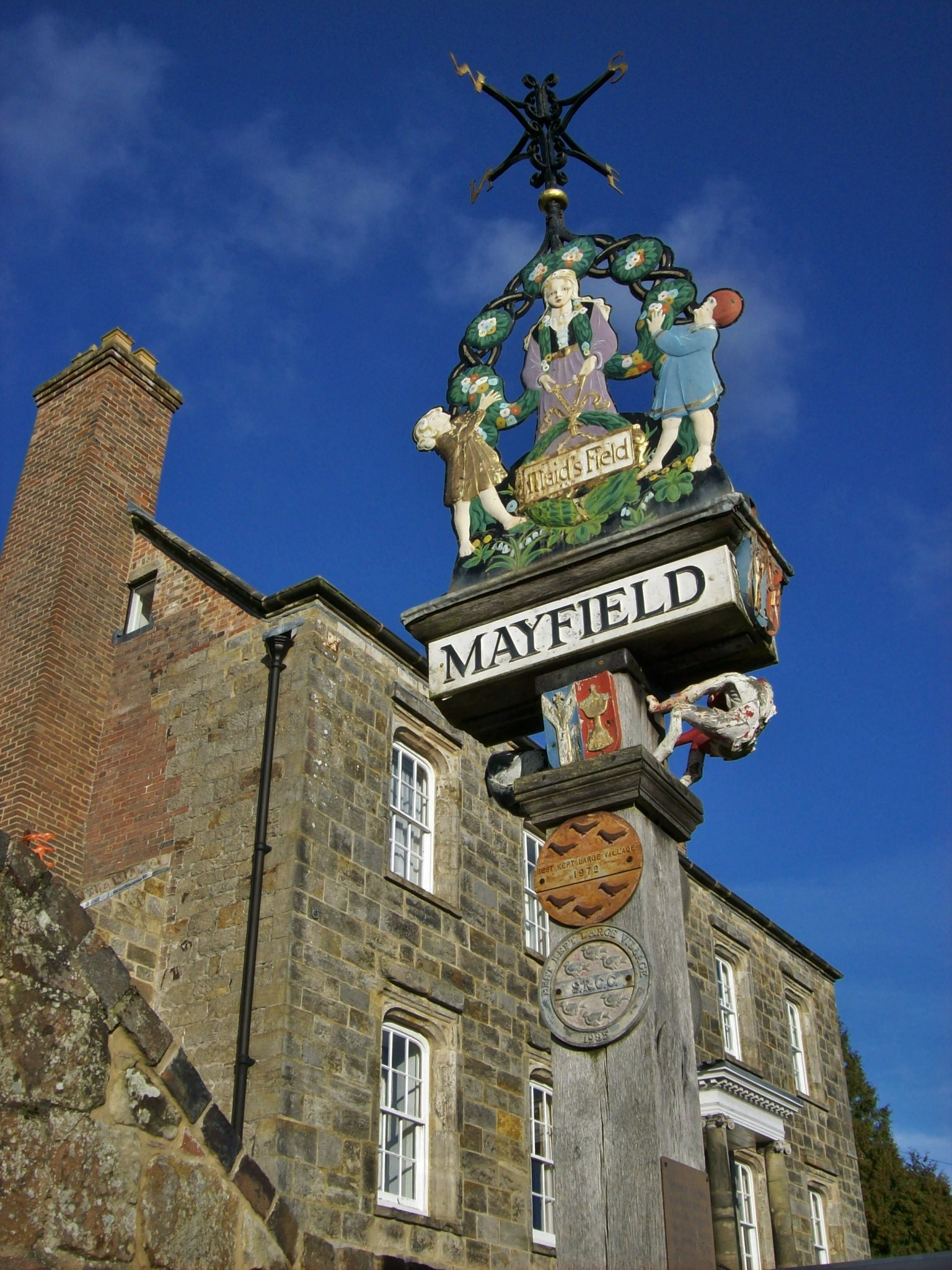
The village sign of Mayfield, East Sussex

- Ushaw Moor, Ushaw College, Chapel of St Cuthbert. First window of north aisle (1910). Manufactured by Kempe & Co. but probably designed by Webb.
  Triptych in the North Cloister (1937). Subject: the English Martyrs.

East Sussex

- Mayfield. Village sign (1922). Subject: a maiden holding a nameplate, with children holding garlands of flowers; below: St Dunstan pulling the Devil's nose with a pair of tongs. This won second prize in a nationwide village sign competition.
- Mayfield, St Dunstan's Church. North nave statue (after 1943). Subject: Virgin and Child.
- Polegate, St George's Church. The church was designed by Webb and J. O'Hanlon Hughes (1938).
- Roedean, Roedean School. East window of the Chapel (1906).
- Seaford, Church of St Thomas More. The original part of the church (the nave, sanctuary, and eastern part of the south aisle) was designed by Webb and J. O'Hanlon Hughes (1935).
  East window, three lights (1935). Subject: the Crucifixion of Christ, with saints.
  South aisle, east window (1946). Subject: (above) Ascension of Christ, Coronation of the Virgin, and Assumption of the Virgin; (below) Noli me tangere, angels, and Pentecost.
- Wych Cross, Ashdown Park Hotel, chapel. East window of the south chapel, cinquefoil (1924–1925). Subject: Jesus in the manger, with cherubs.
  First south window of the south chapel, three lights (1924). Subject: the Virgin Mary, and angels with musical instruments.
  Second south window of the south chapel, three lights (1925). Subject: St Richard, and angels with musical instruments.
  West window of the south chapel, one light (1925). Subject: St Joseph, and angels with musical instruments.

Essex

- Braintree, Our Lady Queen of Peace Church. East window, four lights (1944). Subject: (above) St Michael, the Coronation of the Virgin Mary, and St Gabriel; (below) the Annunciation, the Visitation, the Nativity of Jesus, and a shepherd.
  East window of the north transept, central two of four lights (1948). Subject: the Virgin Mary and angels.
- Lexden, St Leonard's Church. First north nave window, three lights (1937). Subject: St Helena, St Leonard, and St Osyth.
- Little Warley, Warley Barracks, Essex Regiment Chapel. West window, rose window (1930). Subject: coats of arms of Essex County Council and Essex towns.

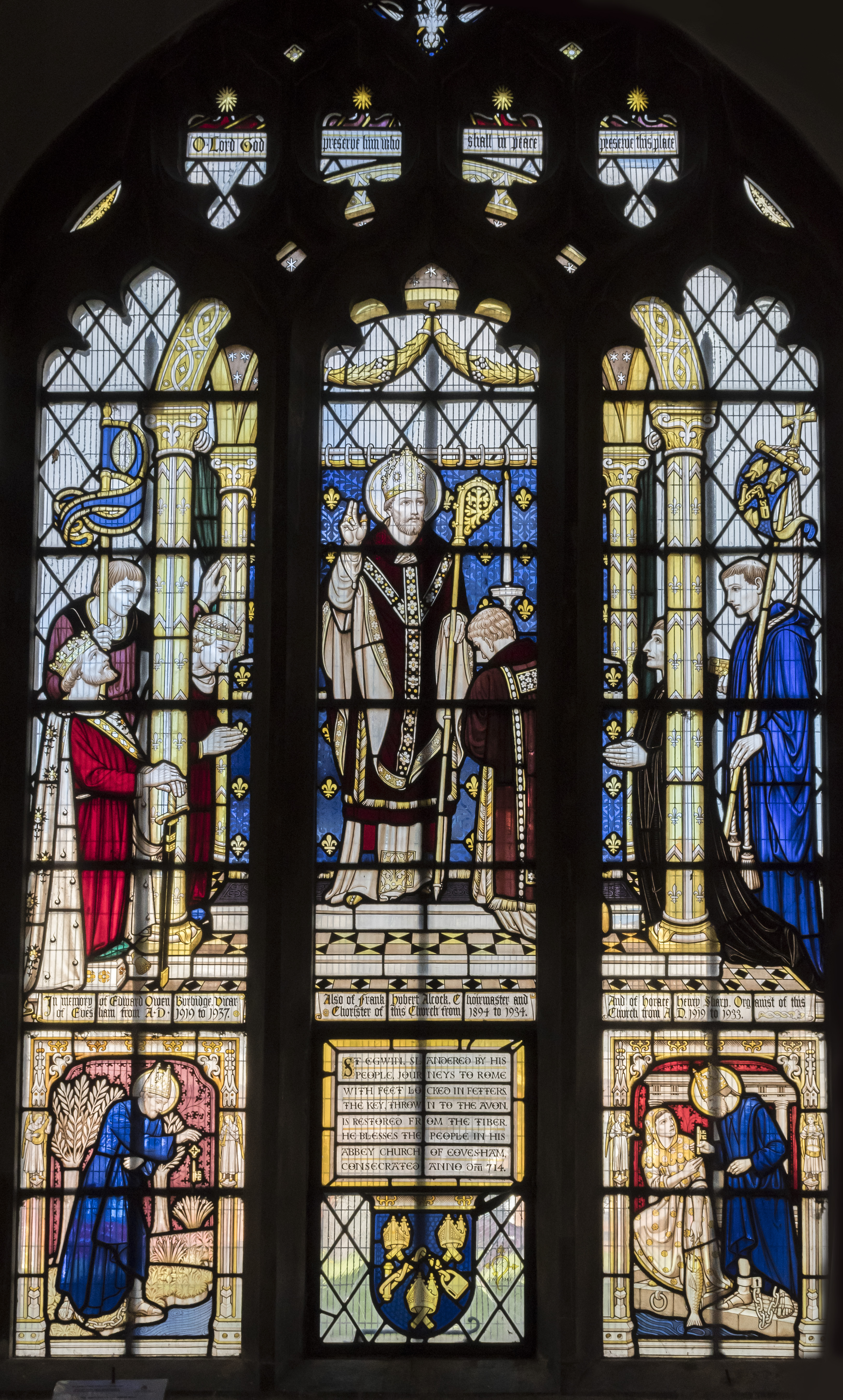
The St Egwin window in St Lawrence's Church, Evesham, Worcestershire

Gloucestershire

- Alderton, St Margaret's Church. East window (1928).
- Cheltenham, Emmanuel Church. East window of south chapel (1942).
- Cirencester, St John the Baptist's Church. East window. Subject: an assemblage of old glass with modifications by Webb. The head of the Christ Child is his work.
- Coaley, St Bartholomew's Church. South-east chancel window (1925).
- Dursley, St James's Church. Two south-west windows (1921)
- Fairford, St Mary's Church. Reredos and altar in the Lady Chapel (c. 1913).
- Gloucester, St Barnabas' Church. East window.
- Icomb, St Mary's Church. South chapel, east window (1948).
- Leckhampton, St Philip and St James Church. Stained-glass window.
- Minchinhampton, Holy Trinity Church. Altar with riddel posts and hangings.
- Newnham on Severn, St Peter's Church. The south aisle windows (1946).
- Painswick, St Mary's Church. South aisle window (1940). With additional figure by Lawrence Lee.
  South aisle window (1947–1948). With heraldry added later by Francis Skeat.
- Poulton, St Michael and All Angels' Church. Two windows on the south side of the nave, each of one light (1946).
  East window.
- Shipton Solars, St Mary's Church. East window. Subject: St Thomas and St Mary Magdalene.
  North window. Subject: Coat of arms of the Fieldhouse family.
  South-west window. Subject: Virgin and Child.
  South-east window, two medallions.
  All of the glass in this church is by Webb.
- Somerford Keynes, All Saints' Church. West window of the north aisle (1947).
- Tarlton, St Osmund's Church. East window and the light above (1947).
- Tewkesbury, Tewkesbury Abbey. South transept window. (1945)
  East window of St Faith's Chapel (1941).
- Tidenham, St Mary and St Peter's Church. East window (1925).
- Woodmancote, St Mark's Church. East window, middle light only.

Greater London

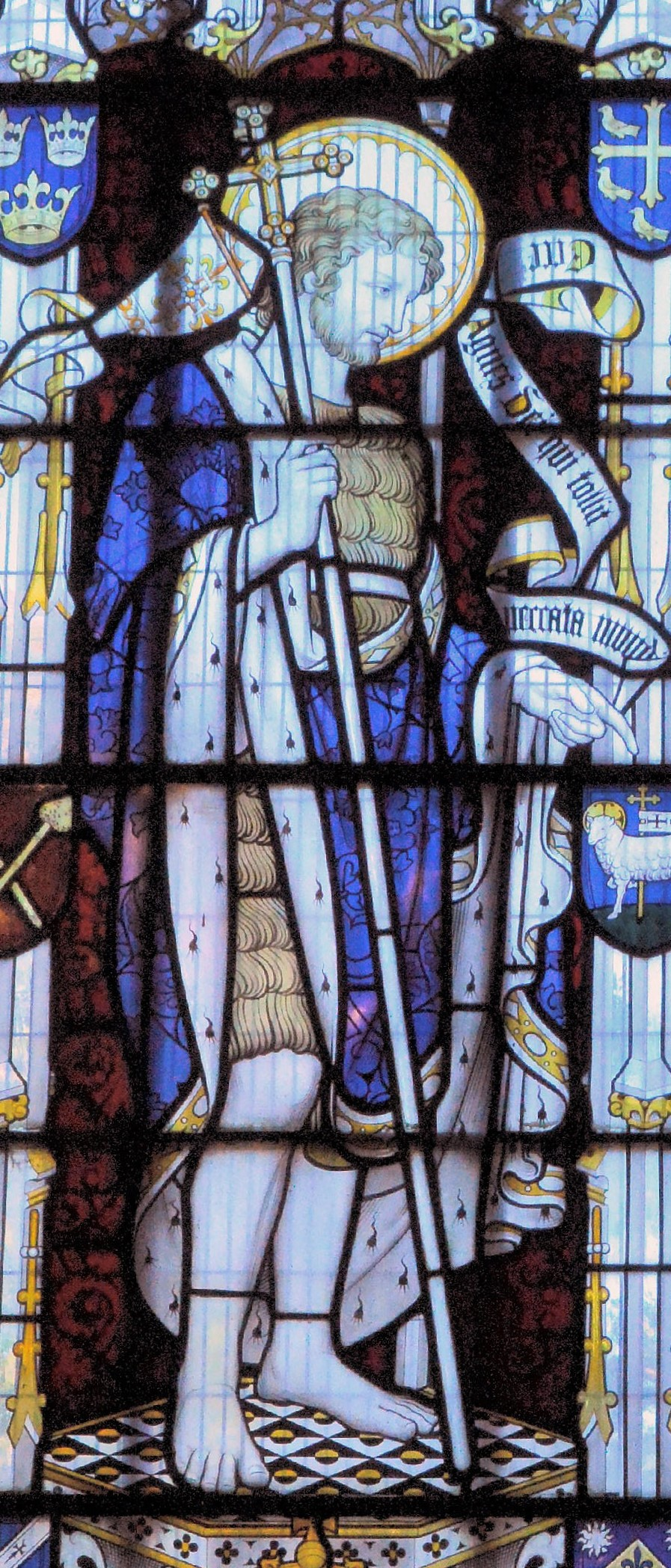
Detail of the St John window in St John the Baptist's Church, Old Malden, London

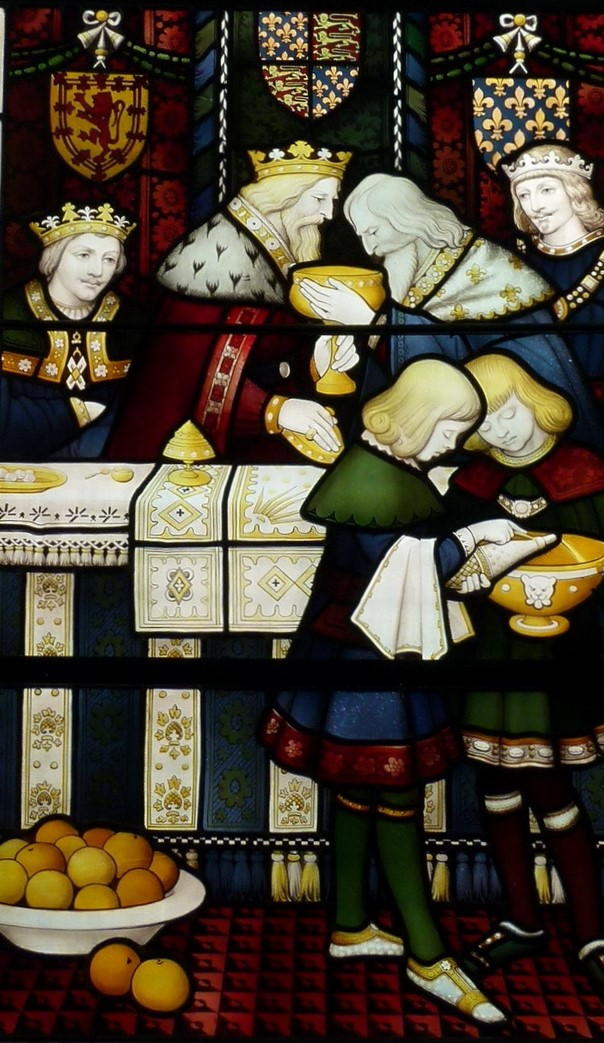
Detail of the Edward III window in Woolwich Town Hall, London

- Beckenham, St George's Church. South chapel window, three lights (1954). Subject: St John the Baptist, St John the Evangelist, and the Virgin Mary.
  South chapel apse window, four lights (1950). Subject: St Gabriel, the Virgin and Child, St Elizabeth, and St Joseph.
- Chingford, St Edmund's Church. East window. Subject: Christ and angels.
- Chislehurst, Church of the Annunciation. East window of the south chapel, three lights (1928). Subject: the Sacraments.
- Chislehurst, Christ Church. Second south aisle window, two lights (1909 or later). Subject: Noli me tangere and the Agony of Christ.
- Coulsdon, St John's Church. The west window of the north aisle of the new extension, one light (1910). Subject: the Annunciation and Jacob's Ladder.
- Custom House, Church of the Ascension. First north aisle window, two lights (after 1915). Subject: the Annunciation. Possibly by Webb.
- Haverstock Hill, Our Lady and St Dominic's Church. Third north aisle window, three lights (1920). Subject: St Wilfrid, Virgin and Child nativity scene, and St Edward the Confessor with St Francis of Assisi.
- Kensington. St Barnabas' Church. Third window in the north wall of the chancel, two lights (1922). Subject: St George.
  Reredos in the south-east corner of the church (1922). Subject: angels holding scrolls and the arms of Kensington Metropolitan Borough Council.
- Knightsbridge, Brompton Oratory, Chapel of the Sacred Heart. Decorated by Webb (c. 1935).
- Marylebone, St James's Church. South-west chapel, alabaster carvings. Subject: the Stations of the Cross.
  First south-west chapel window, one light (1919). Subject: Our Lady, Star of the Sea.
  Second south-west chapel window, one light (1919). Subject: St Michael.
  Third south-west chapel window, one light (1919). Subject: St George in army uniform.
  West window, rose window (1915). Subject: St James the Great and coats of arms.
  Baptistry window, four lights (1925).
- Mayfair, Burlington House. War memorial to the Artists Rifles at the east end of the arcade (c. 1922).
- Old Malden, St John the Baptist's Church. Third north nave window, two lights (1911). Subject: St John the Baptist and St George.
- Tyburn, Tyburn Convent. Chapel furnishings (1936).
- Woolwich, Town Hall. An extensive scheme of stained-glass windows (1904), some of which are here listed.
  Entrance hall. Subject: Phineas Pett, Charles I, and Sovereign of the Seas.
  Entrance hall. Subject: manorial coats of arms.
  Middle committee room. Subject: Edward III, John II of France, David II of Scotland and Valdemar III of Denmark at Eltham Palace.
  Mayor's reception room. Subject: Sir Martin Bowes.
  Council chamber. Subject: Henry VIII.
  Council chamber. Subject: Elizabeth I.
  Council chamber. Subject: Coat of arms of Woolwich Borough Council.
  Public hall. Subject: Henry Maudslay.
  Public hall. Subject: Richard Lovelace.
  Public hall. Subject: General Gordon.

Greater Manchester

- Ladybarn, St Chad's Church. South aisle window (1944). Subject: St Hilda and Cædmon.
- Manchester, Manchester Cathedral. East window of the Derby Chapel (1926).
- Northenden, St Michael and All Angels' Church. East window.

Hampshire

- Copnor, St Alban's Church. North chapel east window, three lights (1920–1950). Subject: Virgin and Child with saints.
  Second north chapel window, three lights (1954). Subject: the Presentation of Jesus at the Temple.
  Third north chapel window, three lights (1953). Subject: St Zacharias, St Elizabeth, and the Virgin Mary.
- Kingsley, St Nicholas' Church. East window, two lights (1949). Subject: St Nicholas and St Margaret of Scotland.

Herefordshire

- Kington, Herefordshire, St Mary's Church. East window of the south chapel (1947).
- Lea, St John the Baptist's Church. Chancel south-east window (1933).
- Leominster, Priory Church. West window of the south aisle (1938).
- Ross-on-Wye, St Frances of Rome's Church. West window of the north nave (1949).

Hertfordshire

- Ware, Sacred Heart and St Joseph's Church. West window, five lights (after 1951). Subject: the betrothal of St. Joseph and the Virgin Mary, the Annunciation, the Nativity of Jesus, the Flight into Egypt, and the Holy Family.

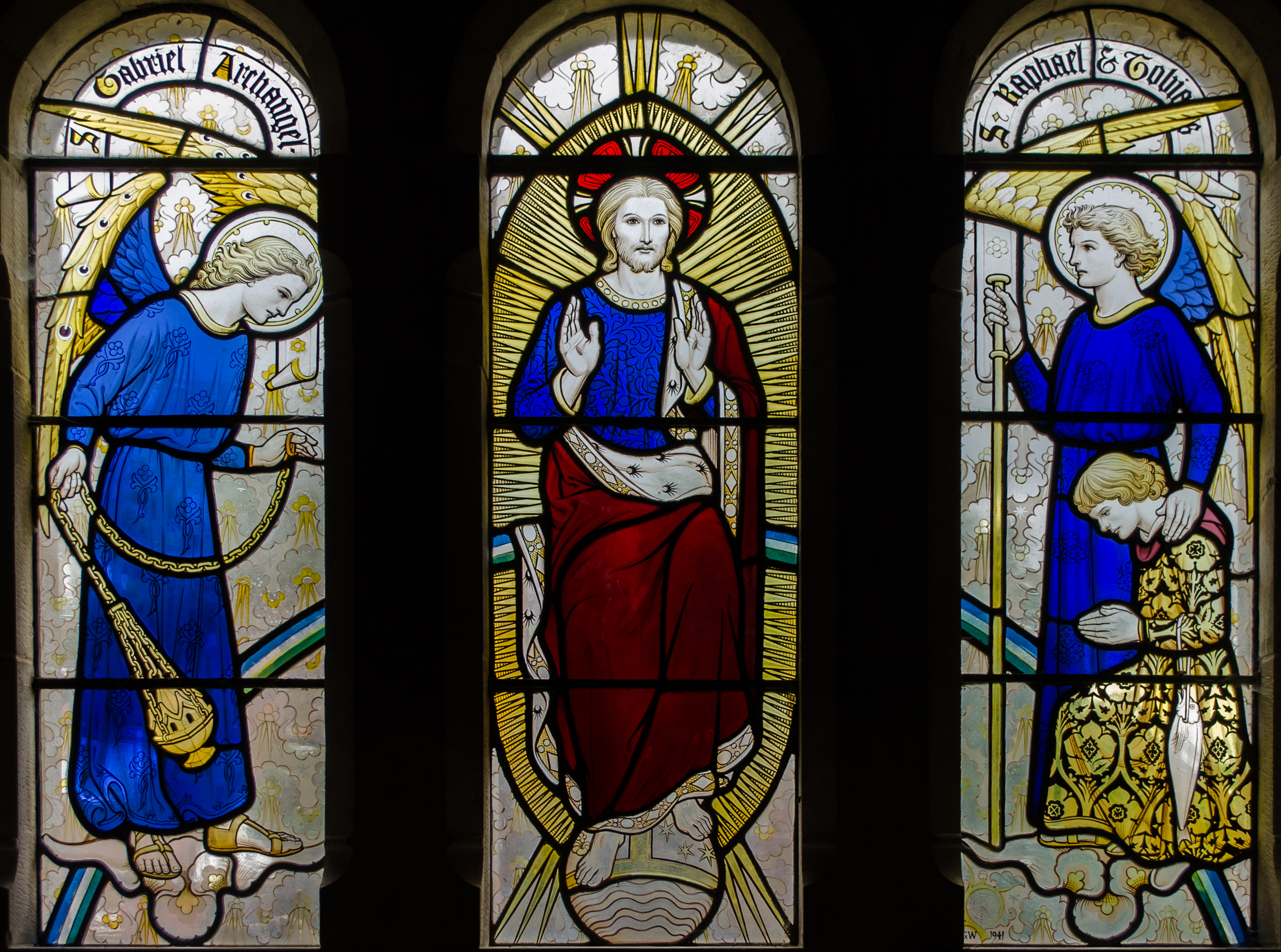
The east window of St Peter's Church, Newenden, Kent

Isle of Wight

- Niton, St John the Baptist's Church. First south aisle window, two lights (1917). Subject: scenes from the life of John the Baptist. By Webb in collaboration with Ernest Heasman.

Kent

- Canterbury, Canterbury Cathedral. Stained glass in tracery in the Great Cloister (1934). Subject: St Gregory and St Mellitus, St Augustine, St Laurence and Archbishop Justus.
- Fawkham, St Mary's Church. Second south chancel window, two lights (1931). Subject: an arrangement of fragments of medieval glass.
- Newenden, St Peter's Church. East window, three lights (1941). Subject: St Gabriel, Christ, and St Raphael and Tobias.
- Ramsgate, St Augustine's Abbey. Quatrefoil in the refectory. Subject: the Trinity. Possibly by Webb.

Lancashire

- Lytham St Annes, St John's Church. South aisle windows (1911). Subject: northern English saints.

Leicestershire

- Leicester, St Mark's Church. West window of the north aisle, three lights of which only the central one remains (1930). Subject: the Triumphal entry into Jerusalem.
- Little Bowden, St Nicholas' Church. West window of the tower, one light (1944). Subject: Transfiguration of Jesus.

Merseyside

- West Kirby, St Andrew's Church. Reredos with canopied figures (1911).

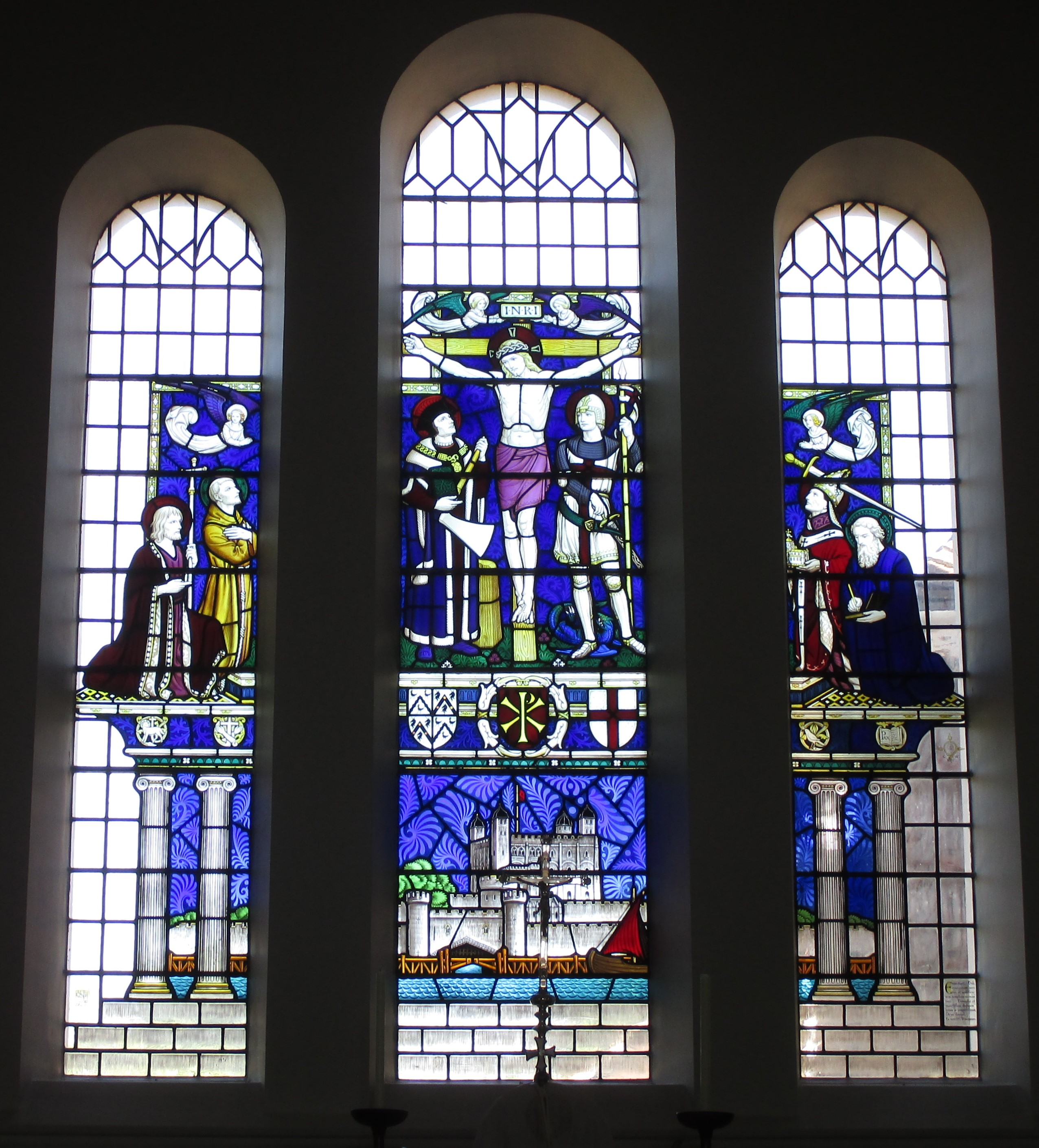
The east window of the Church of St Thomas More, Seaford, East Sussex

Norfolk

- Felmingham, St. Andrew's Church. Subject: Coronation of the Blessed Virgin.
- Houghton Saint Giles, Basilica of Our Lady of Walsingham. East window (1953). Subject: the Definition of the Dogma of the Assumption of Our Lady.

Northamptonshire

- Bozeat, St Mary the Virgin's Church. North nave window, two lights (1917). Subject: Nativity of Jesus.
- Hartwell, St John the Baptist's Church. East window, outer two lights of three-light window (1937). Subject: the Virgin Mary with angels, and St John the Evangelist with angels.

North Yorkshire

- Ampleforth, Abbey Church of St Laurence. All stained glass in St Benet's Chapel and the original four chapels in the crypt (1925).

Nottinghamshire

- Bunny, St Mary's Church. East window (1910).
- Sutton-on-Trent, All Saints' Church. East window of the north aisle, three lights (1927). Subject: St George and the Dragon, St Gabriel, the Holy Spirit as a dove, and St Ursula.

Oxfordshire

- Great Haseley, St Peter's Church. Altar, reredos, and sculptures of St John and the Virgin and Child (1924), in the south-east chapel.
  Altar and dossal curtain (after 1924), in the chancel.
- Iffley, St Mary's Church. East window (1932).
- Thame, St Mary's Church. East window (1929).
- Wantage, St Mary's Convent. East window, three lights (1924). Subject: (left light) the Marriage at Cana, the Nativity of Jesus, and the Annunciation; (central light) Christ in Majesty, the Crucifixion of Christ, and the Virgin and Child; (right light) the Coronation of the Virgin, the Resurrection, and the Visitation.

Shropshire

- Munslow, St Michael's Church. West window of the north aisle (1948). Subject: St Michael between military badges.
- Quatford, St Mary Magdalene's Church. West window (1936). Subject: St Wulfstan and Adeliza, Countess of Shrewsbury.

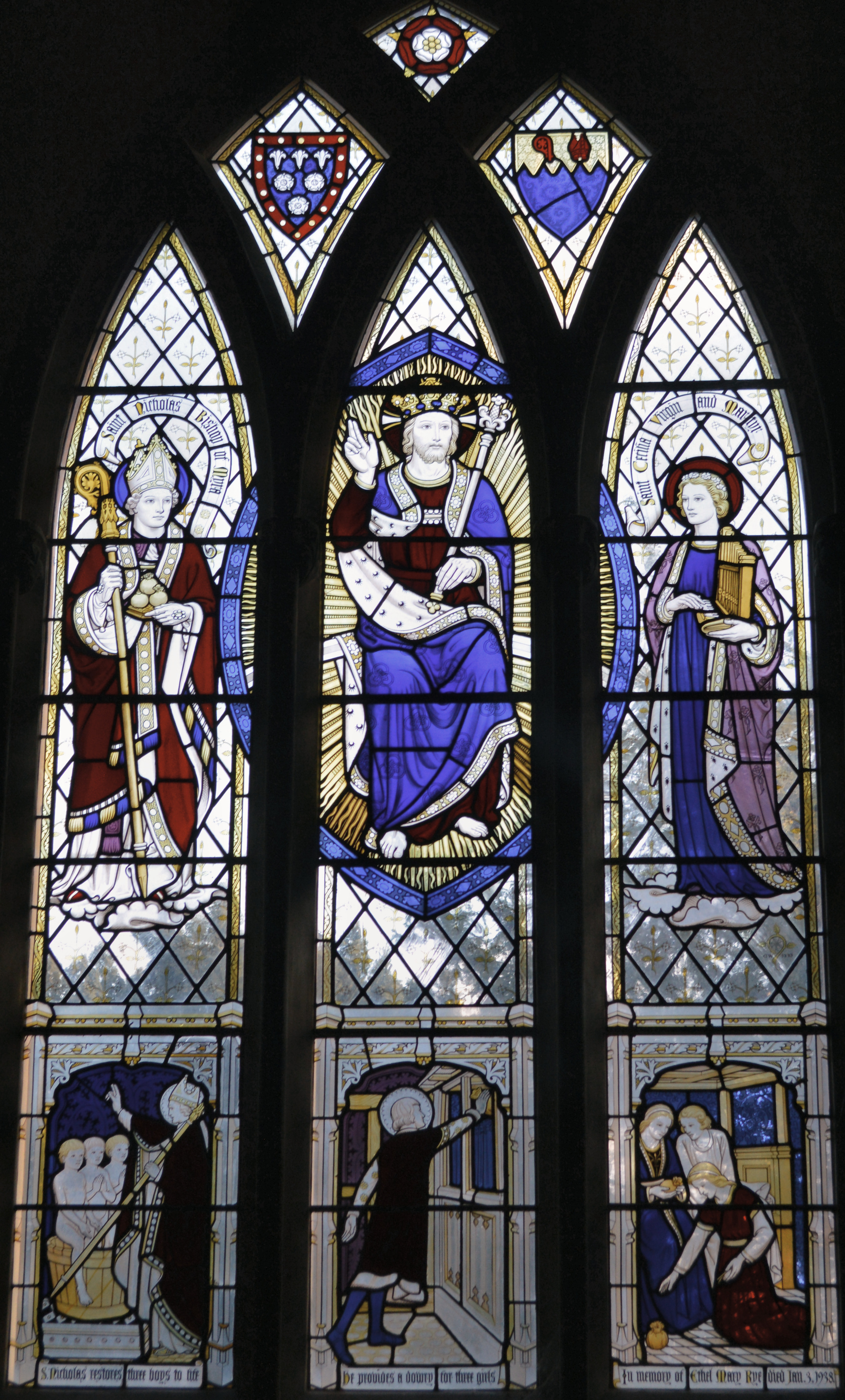
The east window of St Nicholas' Church, Thames Ditton, Surrey

Somerset

- Stratton-on-the-Fosse, Downside Abbey. Stained-glass window in the Gallery Chapel. Subject: St Basil.
  The reredos was designed by Webb and Dame Catherine Weeks.

Staffordshire

- Canwell, St Mary, St Giles and All Saints' Church. North nave window (1938).

Suffolk

- Little Thurlow, St Peter's Church. East window of the south aisle (1937). Subject: Christ's commission to St Peter.
- Pakenham, St Mary's Church. Font cover (1932).

Surrey

- Felbridge, St John the Divine's Church. East window, five lights (1949). Subject: (above) St Peter, St Andrew, St Stephen, St Barnabas, and St Paul; (below) St Mary Magdalene, the Virgin Mary, Christ, St John the Evangelist, and St James the Great.
  First north nave window, central two lights of four lights (1936). Subject: the Presentation of Jesus at the Temple.
- Haslemere, Church of Our Lady of Lourdes. East window, three lights (1935). Subject: angels, saints, Christ, and the Virgin Mary.
  East window of the north chapel, two lights (1935). Subject: the Tree of Jesse and St Bernadette of Lourdes.
  Second north window of the north chapel, one light (1937). Subject: St Joseph.
- Merrow, St John the Evangelist's Church. East window of the north chapel, two lights (1921). Subject: St George and St Michael.
  North window of the north chapel, two lights (1921). Subject: St Joan of Arc and St Martin.
  West window of the north aisle, three lights (1931). Subject: Suffer the little children.
- Newdigate, St Peter's Church. West window of the north aisle, two lights (1950). Subject: the Holy Family.
- Oxted, All Saints' Church. North chancel window, two lights (1929). Subject: St Anne and St Joachim.
  Decoration of the painted and gilded waggon roof (1928).
  The organ gallery and screen.

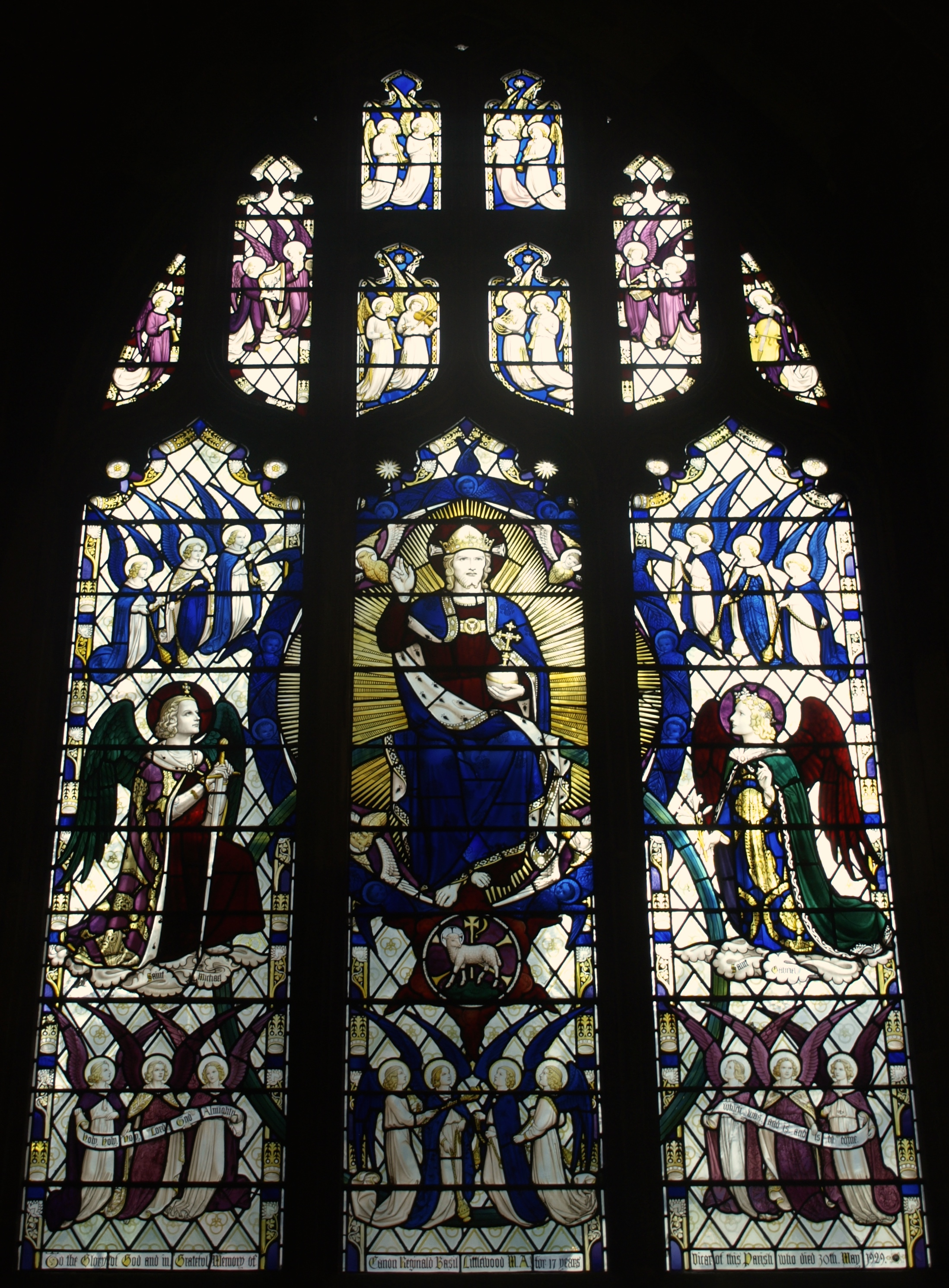
The Christ in Majesty window in Holy Trinity Church, Coventry, West Midlands

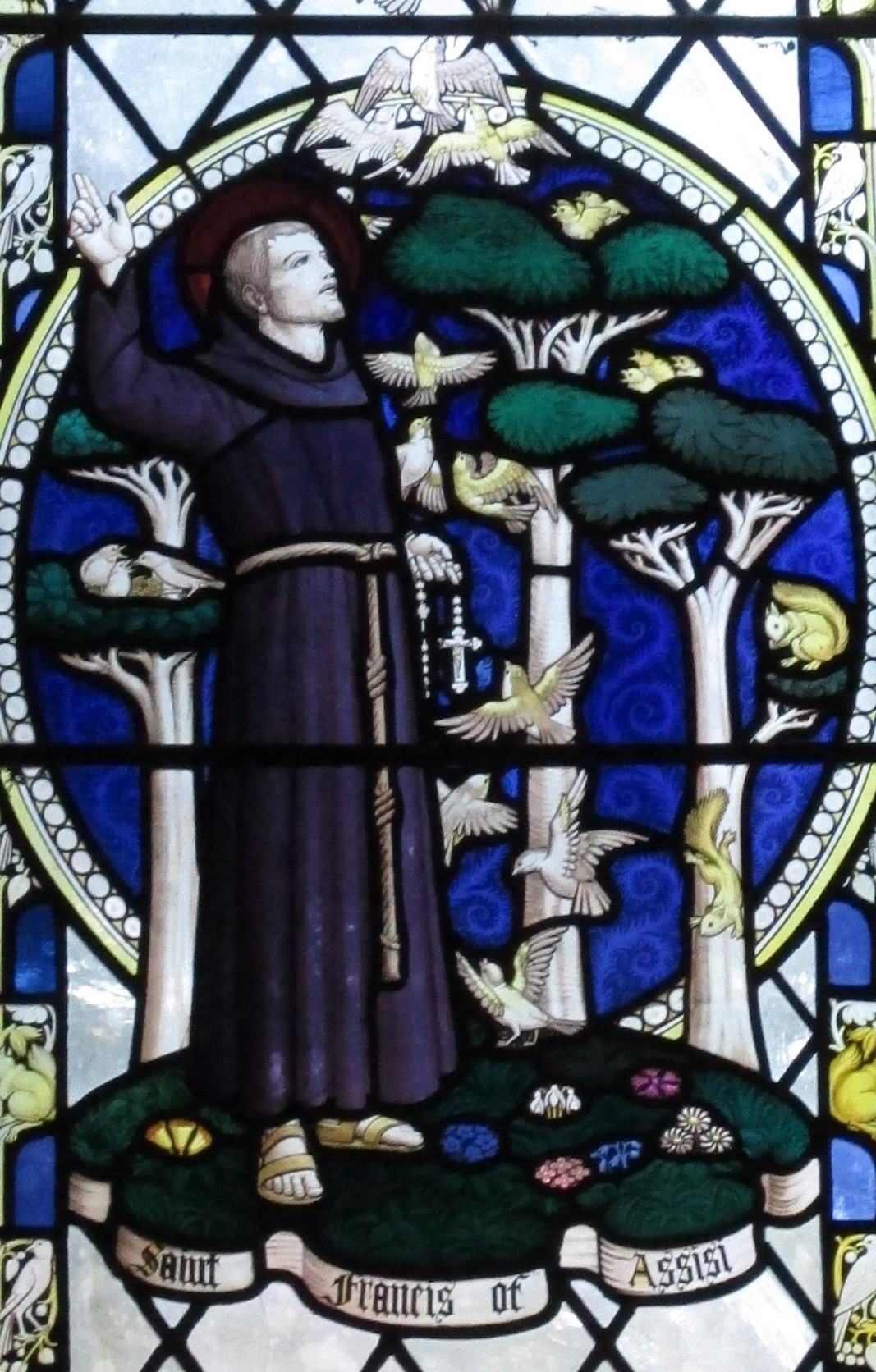
Detail of the St Francis window in St Peter's Church, Cowfold, West Sussex

- Redhill, St Matthew's Church. Fourth south aisle window, two lights (1915). Subject: St Mary Magdalene washing Christ's feet.
- Thames Ditton, St Nicholas' Church. East window, three lights (1939). Subject: St Nicholas, Christ, and St Cecilia.
  Second north aisle window, two lights (1944). Subject: (above) the Nativity of Jesus, (below) Jesus walking on water.

Warwickshire

- Curdworth, St Nicholas and St Peter ad Vincula Church. East window (1912, side lights; 1919, centre light).
  Panel in north window (1925).
- Kenilworth, St Nicholas' Church, Kenilworth. Chancel north window (1935).
- Ladbroke, All Saints' Church. First north aisle window, three lights (1911). Subject: St Nicholas, St Agnes, and St James the Great.
- Lea Marston, St John the Baptist's Church. Painted board war memorial (1923).
- Lower Quinton, St Swithin's Church. Seven stained-glass windows (1921–1939). Subjects: mostly heraldic.
- Welford-on-Avon, St Peter's Church. East window (1924).

West Midlands

- Coventry, Holy Trinity Church. East window of the south chapel. Subject: Christ in Majesty.
- Dudley, St Edmund's Church, Dudley. East window (1929).

West Sussex

- Cowfold, St Peter's Church. Third north aisle window, one light (1934). Subject: St Francis.
- East Grinstead, East Grinstead Museum. Theatrical poster for a production of The Merry Wives of Windsor by the East Grinstead Repertory Company.
- East Grinstead, St Mary the Virgin's Church, East Grinstead. East window, five lights. Subject: Christ in Majesty and saints.
  First south aisle window, one light (1916). Subject: St Augustine.
  Second south aisle window, three lights (1913). Subject: St Wilfrid, St George, and St Richard.
  West window of the south aisle, three lights (1924). Subject: Moses, the Good Shepherd, and St Peter and St Cornelius.
  Second north aisle window, three lights (1916). Subject: St Monica, St Anne and the Virgin Mary, and St Elizabeth and the young St John the Baptist.
- East Grinstead, Sackville House. Ironwork grille. Installed by Webb in the gate of his own house for the benefit of passers-by who would not otherwise enjoy the view of Ashdown Forest.
- Haywards Heath, St Paul's Church. East window of the north chapel, lunette. Subject: Assumption of the Virgin Mary and angels. Possibly by Webb.
- Henfield, St Peter's Church, Henfield. East window of the Parham chapel, four lights (1921). Subject: angels, Joshua, and St John the Evangelist. A collaboration with Frank Ernest Howard.
- Lindfield, All Saints Church. East window of the north chapel, three lights (1935). Subject: Christ and saints.
- Scaynes Hill, St Augustine's Church. First south chancel window, four lights (1947). Subject: badges and leaf pattern.

West Yorkshire

- Leeds, Leeds Beckett University, Pearson Corridor. Stained glass windows (mostly 1906–1907) illustrating the history of the firm of S Pearson & Son, originally commissioned for the firm's offices at 47 Parliament Street, Westminster.

Wiltshire

- Charlton (near Donhead St Mary), St John's Church. East window, one light (1948). Subject: St Michael, the Virgin and Child, and St John the Baptist.
- Donhead St Mary, St Mary's Church. Second south aisle window, two lights (after 1944). Subject: St Francis and the birds.
- Nunton, St Andrew's Church. East window of the south chapel, two lights (1933). Subject: the Visitation, the Nativity of Jesus, and the Baptism of Jesus.

Worcestershire

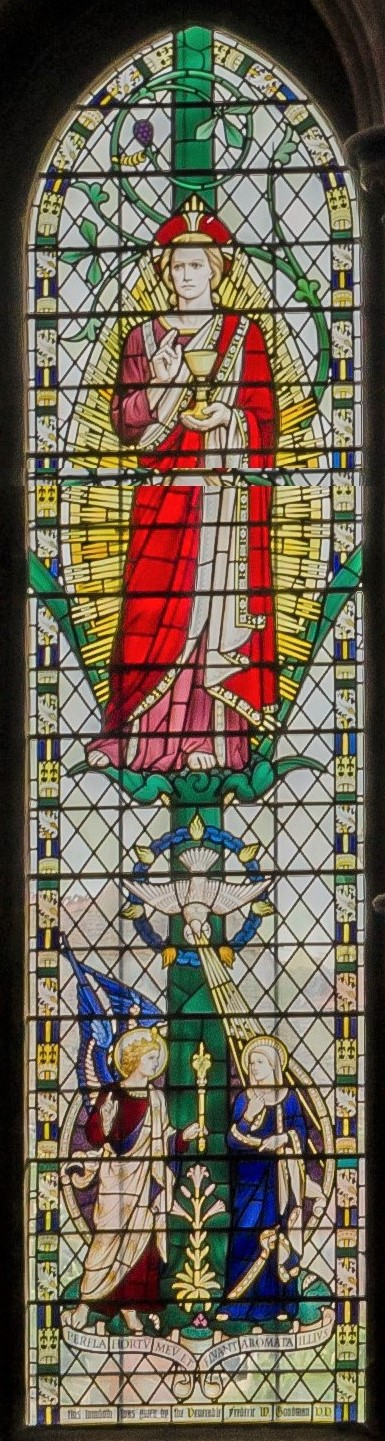
One light of the True Vine window in Worcester Cathedral

- Evesham, St Lawrence's Church. First, second and third north aisle windows (1938–1944).
- Himbleton, St Mary Magdalene's Church. South-east chancel window (c. 1910).
  South window of the south transept (c. 1910).
- Worcester, St Alban's Church. West window of the north aisle (1919).
- Worcester, Worcester Cathedral. South window of the south-east transept (1937). Subject: Christ as the True Vine, St Dunstan etc.

=== Wales ===
Clwyd

- Llandrillo, St Trillo's Church. First north nave window, three lights (1936). Subject: St Trillo and two other saints.
- Rhuddlan, St Mary's Church. South aisle window, one light (1934). Subject: the Visitation.

Gwynedd

- Tywyn. St Cadfan's Church. South chancel window, two lights. Subject: the Adoration of the Magi.
  First north aisle window, one light (1943). Subject: the Boy Christ as the True Vine.
  South aisle window, one light (c. 1943). Subject: the Virgin and Child.

Powys

- Llanidloes, St Idloes' Church. North aisle window, three lights (1932). Subject: St David, St Idloes, and St Deiniol.
  North aisle window, three lights (1932). Subject: St Michael and the Dragon with warrior angels.

South Glamorgan

- Cardiff, Llandaff Cathedral, Lady Chapel. Painted stencil patterns on the walls and vaults (1909).
  East window, five lights (1951). Subject: the Tree of Jesse.
  South window, two lights (1952). Subject: the Presentation in the Temple and the Adoration of the Magi.
  South window, two lights (1952). Subject: the Flight into Egypt and the Marriage at Cana.
  North window, two lights (c. 1928). Subject: the Annunciation and the Expulsion from Eden.
  North window, two lights (c. 1928). Subject: the Visitation and the Annunciation to Zachariah.
- Splott, St Saviour's Church. East window of the north aisle, three lights. Subject: King David, the Virgin and Child, and Isaiah.

=== Scotland ===
Aberdeenshire

- Aberdeen, Kirk of St Nicholas, West Kirk. West window of the north aisle (1927). Subject: St Nicholas.

=== Denmark ===
Capital Region

- Copenhagen, St Alban's Church. Queen Alexandra Memorial, comprising a tablet and two windows, north wall of the transept (1929). Subject: St Hilda and St Elizabeth of Hungary.

=== South Africa ===
Gauteng

- Johannesburg, Johannesburg Anglican Cathedral. Stained-glass windows in the Chapel of the Holy Spirit (1930–1937).

Western Cape

- George, George Cathedral. Three stained-glass windows.
