= Sullivan baronets of Thames Ditton (1804) =

The Sullivan baronetcy, of Thames Ditton in the County of Surrey, was created in the Baronetage of the United Kingdom on 22 May 1804 for the writer and MP Richard Sullivan. The third and sixth Baronets were Admirals in the Royal Navy. The ninth holder of the baronetcy did not use his title; as of 2023 the Official Roll marked the baronetcy as vacant.

== Sullivan baronets, of Thames Ditton (1804) ==
- Sir Richard Joseph Sullivan, 1st Baronet (1752–1806)
- Sir Henry Sullivan, 2nd Baronet (1785–1814)
- Sir Charles Sullivan, 3rd Baronet (1789–1862), Admiral of the Blue
- Sir Charles Sullivan, 4th Baronet (1820–1865)
- Sir Edward Robert Sullivan, 5th Baronet (1826–1899)
- Sir Francis William Sullivan, 6th Baronet (1834–1906)
- Sir Frederick Sullivan, 7th Baronet (1865–1954)
- Sir Richard Benjamin Magniac Sullivan, 8th Baronet (1906–1977)
- Sir Richard Arthur Sullivan, 9th Baronet (1931–2022)
- Charles Merson Sullivan, presumed 10th Baronet (born 1962)

The heir apparent is Alun David Sullivan (born 1998).

== Arms ==
Coat of arms of Sullivan baronets of Thames Ditton
Crest On a ducal coronet or a robin holding a sprig of laurel proper. Escutcheon Per fesse the base per pale in chief or a dexter hand grasping a sword gules entwined with a serpent proper between two lions rampant respectant of the second the dexter base vert charged with a buck trippant or on the sinister base per pale argent and sable a boar passant counterchanged. Motto Lamh foisdineach an uachter What we gain by conquest we secure by clemency.

== Notes ==
Baronetage of the United Kingdom
Preceded by Honyman baronets	Sullivan baronets of Thames Ditton; 22 May 1804	Succeeded by Mainwaring baronets
