= Sir Richard Sullivan, 1st Baronet =

British Member of Parliament

Sir Richard Sullivan Bt, FRS

Member of Parliament for Seaford
- In office 1802–1806 Serving with Charles Ellis
- Preceded by: Charles Ellis; George Ellis
- Succeeded by: Charles Ellis; John Leach

Member of Parliament for New Romney
- In office 1787–1796 Serving with John Henniker, Elijah Impey
- Preceded by: Edward Dering; John Henniker
- Succeeded by: John Fordyce; John Willett Willett

Personal details
- Born: 10 December 1752
- Died: 17 July 1806 (aged 53)
- Spouse: Mary Ann Lodge (m. 1778)
- Parent(s): Benjamin Sullivan; Bridget Limric

Sir Richard Joseph Sullivan, 1st Baronet, FRS (10 December 1752 – 17 July 1806) was a British MP and writer.

== Early life ==
Sullivan was born on 10 December 1752. He was the third son of Benjamin Sullivan of Dromeragh, Co. Cork, by his wife Bridget Limrick, daughter of Paul Limrick, D.D. Among his siblings was brother, John Sullivan, also an MP who married a daughter of George Hobart, 3rd Earl of Buckinghamshire.

== Career ==
With the help of his relative Laurence Sulivan, the Chairman of the British East India Company, he was sent early in life to India with his brother John. On his return to Europe, he made a tour through various parts of England, Scotland and Wales. He was elected a Fellow of the Society of Antiquaries on 9 June 1785 and a Fellow of the Royal Society on 22 December 1785.

On 29 January 1787, Sullivan was elected MP for New Romney and returned for the same constituency at the general election on 19 June 1790. He lost his seat in 1796, but on 5 July 1802 was elected for Seaford, another of the Cinque ports. Although often voting in the House of Commons, there is no record of him having made a speech there. On 22 May 1804, on Pitt's return to office, he was created a baronet of the United Kingdom.

He wrote a number of books on political issues.

== Personal life ==
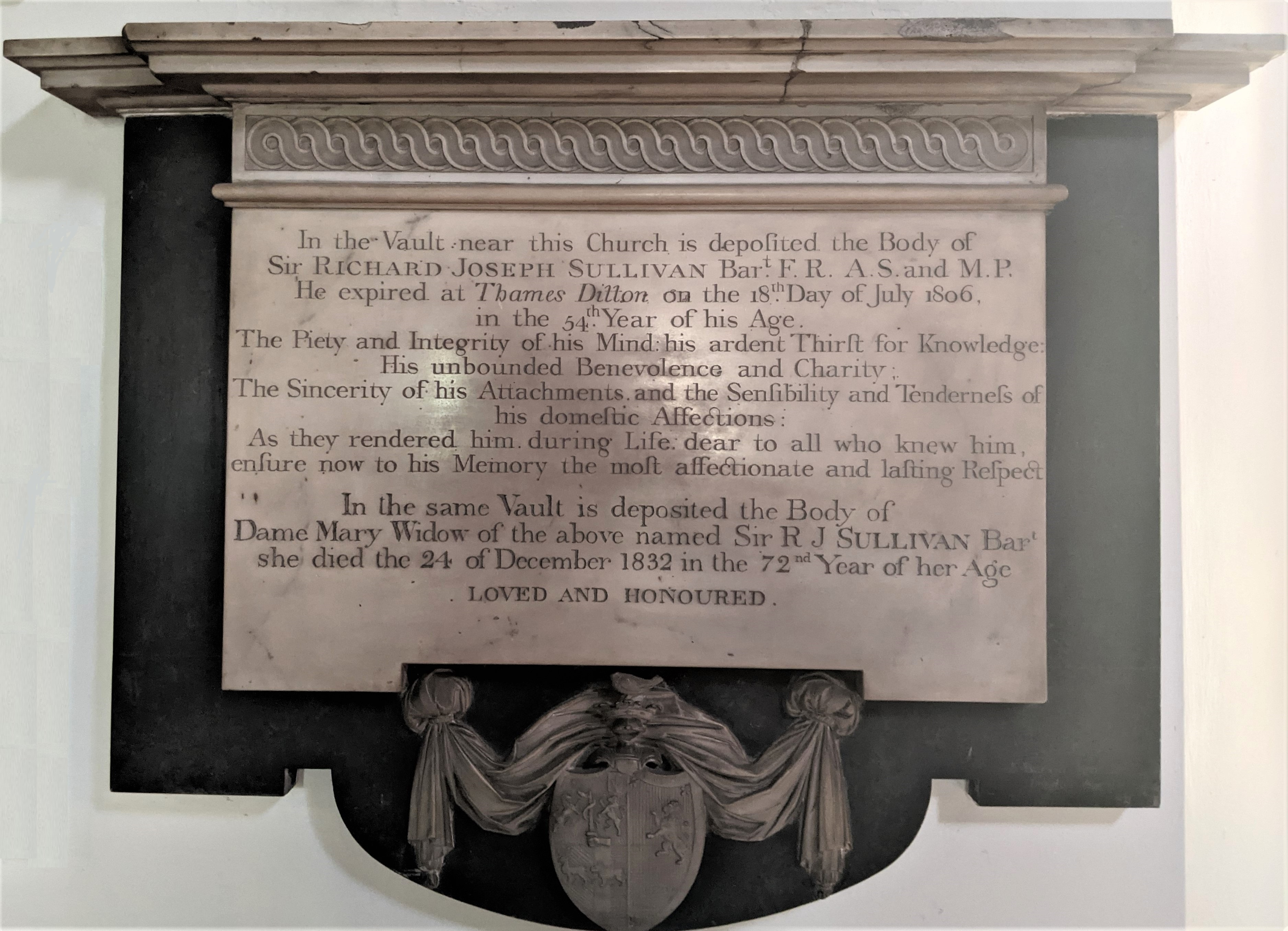
Sullivan's memorial plaque in the Church of St Nicholas, Thames Ditton, Surrey

On 3 December 1778 Sullivan married Mary Lodge, a daughter of Thomas Lodge of Leeds. Together, they were the parents of:

- Richard Sullivan (d. 1789), who died young.
- Maria Sullivan (1786–1786), who died in infancy.
- Lt. Col. Sir Henry Sullivan (1785–1814), who served as an officer in the Coldstream Guards and was killed at the Battle of Bayonne in 1814. Unmarried.
- Charlotte Sullivan (1787–1873), who married William Hale, son of the Hon. Mary Grimston (daughter of the 2nd Viscount Grimston) and great-grandson of Sir Bernard Hale.
- Adm. Sir Charles Sullivan (1789–1862), who married Jean Anne Taylor and had several children, including Sir Charles and Sir Edward.
- Elizabeth Sullivan (1790–1846), who married the Rev. Hon. Frederick Pleydell-Bouverie, fourth son of Jacob Pleydell-Bouverie, 2nd Earl of Radnor.
- Edward Richard Sullivan (1791–1824), who married Eliza Maria Caldwell, daughter of Gen. Sir James Lillyman Caldwell. They had two sons and a daughter, Maria Charlotte (who married Sir John Lees, 3rd Baronet).
- Thomas Sullivan (d. 1796)
- Rev. Frederick Sullivan (1797–1873), who married Arabella Jane Wilmot, a granddaughter of Sir Chaloner Ogle, 1st Baronet; they had two sons and a daughter, including Sir Francis Sullivan, 6th Baronet. After her death, he married Emily Ames.
- Maj. Arthur Sullivan (1801–1832), who died unmarried.
- Maj.-Gen. William Sullivan (1804–1870), who married Euphemia Caulfield Harrington. No known issue.

Sullivan died at his home in Thames Ditton, Surrey, on 17 July 1806, and is commemorated by a memorial plaque in the Church of St Nicholas, Thames Ditton. Their eldest son died young in 1789, and the title devolved to the second son, Henry, MP for the City of Lincoln. The latter was succeeded as third baronet by his brother, Sir Charles Sullivan, who entered the navy in February 1801 and became Admiral of the Blue.

== Bibliography ==
- ‘An Analysis of the Political History of India. In which is considered the present situation of the East, and the connection of its several Powers with the Empire of Great Britain’ (anon.), London, 1779, 4to; 2nd edit., with the author's name, 1784, 8vo; translated into German by M. C. Sprengel, Halle, 1787, 8vo.
- ‘Thoughts on Martial Law, and on the proceedings of general Courts-Martial’ (anon.), London, 1779, 4to; 2nd edit. enlarged, with the author's name, London, 1784, 8vo.
- ‘Observations made during a Tour through parts of England, Scotland, and Wales, in a series of Letters’ (anon.), London, 1780, 4to; 2nd edit., 2 vols., London, 1785, 8vo; reprinted in Mavor's 'British Tourists.'
- ‘Philosophical Rhapsodies: Fragments of Akbur of Betlis; containing Reflections on the Laws, Manners, Customs, and Religions of Certain Asiatic, Afric, and European Nations,’ 3 vols., London, 1784–5, 8vo.
- ‘Thoughts on the Early Ages of the Irish Nation and History, and on the Ancient Establishment of the Milesian Families in that Kingdom; with a particular reference to the descendants of Heber, the eldest son of Milesius,’ 1789, 8vo. Of this curious work, two editions of one hundred copies each were privately printed.
- ‘A View of Nature, in Letters to a Traveller among the Alps, with Reflections on Atheistical Philosophy now exemplified in France’ 6 vols., London, 1794, 8vo; translated into German by E. B. G. Hebenstreit, 4 vols., Leipzig, 1795–1800, 8vo.

Parliament of Great Britain
Preceded by Edward Dering; John Henniker	Member of Parliament for New Romney; 1787 – 1796; With: John Henniker; Elijah Impey	Succeeded by John Fordyce; John Willett Willett
Parliament of the United Kingdom
Preceded by Charles Ellis; George Ellis	Member of Parliament for Seaford; 1802 – 1806; With: Charles Ellis	Succeeded by Charles Ellis; John Leach
Baronetage of the United Kingdom
New creation	Baronet (of Thames Ditton); 1804–1806	Succeeded by Henry Sullivan
