= Sir Henry Sullivan, 2nd Baronet =

British Member of Parliament and soldier

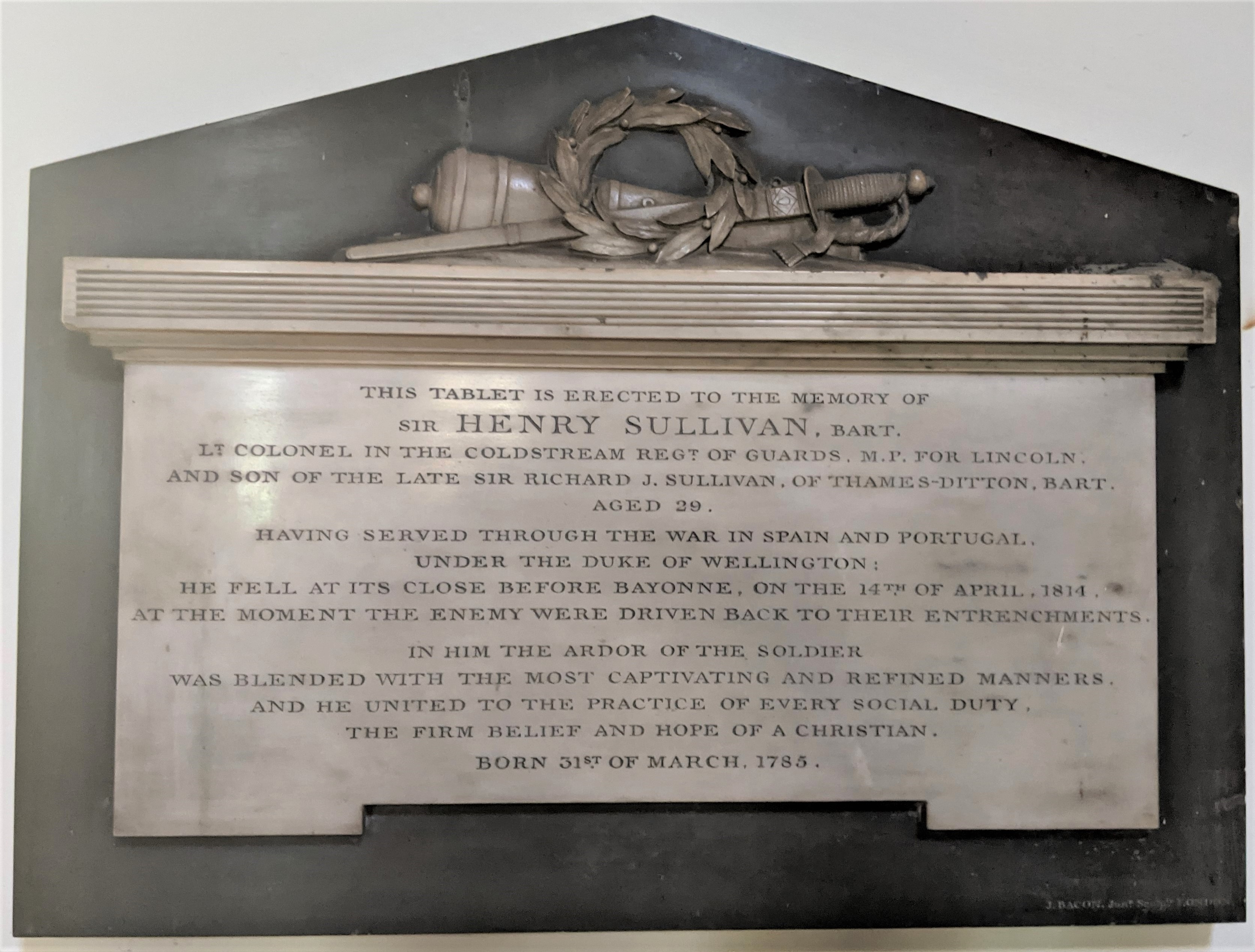
Sullivan's memorial plaque in the Church of St Nicholas, Thames Ditton, Surrey

Sir Henry Sullivan, 2nd Baronet (13 March 1785 – 14 April 1814) was an English politician and army officer.

He was the son of Sir Richard Sullivan, 1st Baronet, a Member of Parliament, who also wrote a number of books on political matters. Educated at Eton College, Henry inherited the baronetcy on the death of his father in July 1806.

In the October 1812 general election Sullivan, a supporter of the ruling Tory party, was simultaneously elected Member of Parliament (MP) for both Rye and Lincoln. Standing down as MP for Rye after a by-election in December 1812, Sullivan continued to represent Lincoln until his death in April 1814. Since he was a serving soldier, he played little part in Parliamentary business. He made no formal speeches, and voted only twice – in May 1813 against the Catholic Relief Bill and in June 1813 in support of Christian missions to India as part of the Charter Bill.

Sullivan served in the Coldstream Guards during the Peninsular War, becoming a company commander in September 1812. As a Foot Guards captain and a lieutenant-colonel in the army, he was killed at the Battle of Bayonne, in south France, on 14 April 1814.

He was succeeded as third baronet by his younger brother Charles, a Royal Naval officer who eventually became an admiral.

There are memorial plaques to Sir Henry Sullivan, as well as to his father and other members of his family, in the Church of St Nicholas, Thames Ditton, Surrey.

Parliament of the United Kingdom
Preceded by William Jacob; Stephen Lushington	Member of Parliament for Rye; October – December 1812; With: Thomas Phillipps Lamb	Succeeded by Thomas Phillipps Lamb; Charles Wetherell
Preceded by Richard Ellison	Member of Parliament for Lincoln; October 1812 – April 1814; With: John Nicholas Fazakerley	Succeeded by Coningsby Waldo-Sibthorpe
