= Sir Francis Sullivan, 6th Baronet =

Royal Navy Admiral (1834–1906)

Admiral Sir Francis Sullivan Bt KCB CMG
- Born: 31 May 1834
- Died: 13 May 1906 (aged 71)
- Military career
- Allegiance: United Kingdom
- Branch: Royal Navy
- Rank: Admiral
- Commands: HMS Tamar; HMS Volage; HMS Immortalité; HMS Duke of Wellington; Cape of Good Hope Station
- Awards: Knight Commander of the Order of the Bath; Companion of the Order of St Michael and St George

Admiral Sir Francis William Sullivan, 6th Baronet, KCB, CMG (31 May 1834 – 13 May 1906) was a Royal Navy officer who went on to be Commander-in-Chief, Cape of Good Hope Station.

== Naval career ==
Born the son of the Reverend Frederick Sullivan (fourth son of Sir Richard Sullivan, 1st Baronet) and Arabella Wilmont, Sullivan was appointed a lieutenant in the Royal Navy in 1856. Promoted to captain in 1863, he commanded HMS Tamar, HMS Volage, HMS Immortalité and then HMS Duke of Wellington. He was appointed Commander-in-Chief, Cape of Good Hope and West Coast of Africa Station in 1876 and Commander-in-Chief of a Detached Squadron in 1881. He served as Director of Transports at the Admiralty from April 1883 to August 1888.

== Family ==
In 1861 he married Agnes Bell; they had two sons. He died at his residence in Portman Square, London. His younger son, Richard, was commander of HMS Pandora at the time of his death.

Military offices
Preceded by Sir William Hewett	Commander-in-Chief, Cape of Good Hope Station; 1876–1879	Succeeded by Sir Frederick Richards
Baronetage of the United Kingdom
Preceded by Edward Robert Sullivan	Baronet (of Thames Ditton); 1899–1906	Succeeded by Frederick Sullivan
