= Frederick Sullivan (cricketer) =

English cricketer

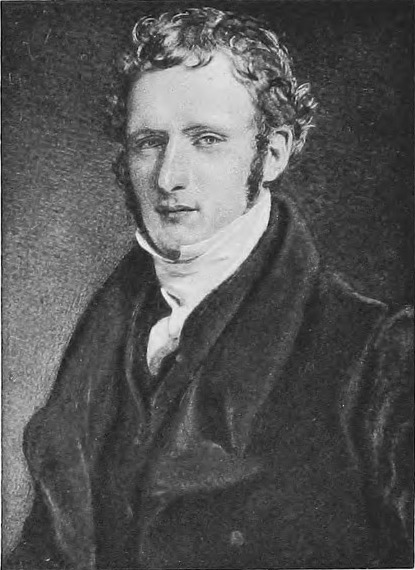

Personal information
- Born: 1 February 1797; England
- Died: 28 July 1873 (aged 76); Kimpton, Hertfordshire, England

Domestic team information
- Years: Team
- 1821: Marylebone Cricket Club (MCC)

Reverend Frederick Sullivan (1 February 1797 – 28 July 1873) was an English cricketer who played for the Marylebone Cricket Club in the 1820s. He is recorded in one match in 1821, totalling 33 runs with a highest score of 20 and holding 2 catches.

Sullivan was the son Sir Richard Sullivan, 1st Baronet and Mary Lodge. He married Arabella Jane Wilmot in 1821 and Emily Ames in 1843. Rev. Sullivan was Vicar at Kimpton, Hertfordshire.

== Bibliography ==
- Haygarth, Arthur (1862). Scores & Biographies, Volume 1 (1744–1826). Lillywhite.
