= Church of St Nicholas, Thames Ditton =

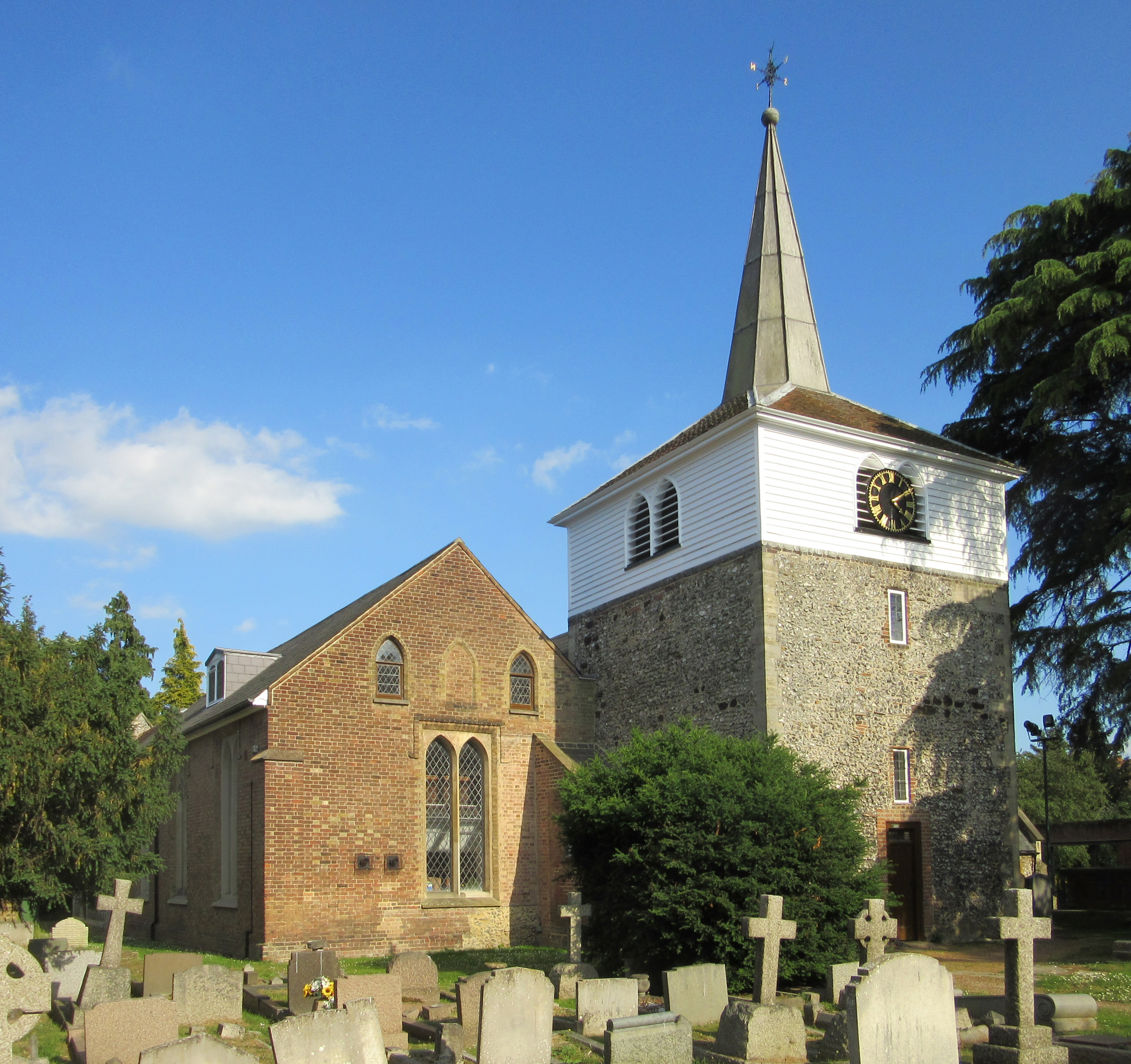
- St Nicholas's Church

- Location in Surrey
- 51°23′33″N 0°19′58″W
- Location: Thames Ditton, Surrey
- Country: England
- Denomination: Church of England
- Website: St Nicholas's Church website

History
- Status: Consecrated

Architecture
- Functional status: Active
- Heritage designation: Grade I listed
- Architectural type: Medieval, Gothic and Neo-Gothic

Specifications
- Materials: Body: sandstone-dressed flint and brick Roof: plain tiles and slate

Administration
- Diocese: Guildford
- Archdeaconry: Dorking
- Parish: Thames Ditton

St Nicholas Church in Thames Ditton, Surrey, England, is a Grade I listed Anglican parish church that has parts that date back to the 12th century.

== History ==
The Norman manorial owner after the Conquest gave the churchlands and tithes payable across the privately held land (the bulk, which did not form wooded or meadowland common or unproductive waste) to the monks of the parish to Merton Priory: during the reign of Henry I (1100–1135), Gilbert the Norman, High Sheriff of Surrey, gave the advowson of Kingston - the right to appoint the incumbent priest of a church - together with four young chapelries (Note: At Thames Ditton, East Molesey, Sheen and Petersham) to Merton Priory. Whether these were fully built of stone at the point is uncertain.

Gilbert died in 1125, which demonstrates a functional chapelry, whether or not of stone, at Thames Ditton around 1120, with higher levels of ecclesiastical control by Kingston Church and Merton Priory. In any event the earliest stonework of the church appears to English Heritage to date to the 12th century. A certain 'William' was Vicar at Thames Ditton from 1179.

After the Dissolution of the Monasteries, the advowson and rectory of St Nicholas passed into private hands as from 1538. For previous centuries, the great tithes rested with Kingston rectory, whereas the owners of Imber Court replaced it from the 16th century until the 19th century as partial tithe beneficiaries and patrons, paying for the curate himself. By 1848, the rectory had been replaced by a perpetual curacy belonging to King's College, Cambridge.

== Church structure and contents ==
The building is mostly flint stones with stone dressings, its tower brick and stonework dressings with tile patchings, a weatherboard is above. A notable exception is an aisle wall which is brick. The roof is of plain tiles except the porch which is of slate. As reflected by these materials and the degree of dressing, the building has undergone a great many changes, and very little of the original structure is visible. The oldest elements are likely to be the north wall of the chancel and the walls of the broad and low tower. It was originally a long narrow Norman building from the bell tower to the chancel. The tower walls and the north wall of the chancel are part of the original Norman structure and contain lancet windows. Additions came with a 14th-century chapel on the north and a 15th-century north aisle. The vestry was originally a burial vault built in 1676. The north aisle was enlarged in 1836 and a south aisle added in 1864.

- The church has one of the finest fonts in Surrey, dated around 1120 and having unique sculptures. On the four faces of the Norman font are depicted an Agnus Dei, a goat, a star and an unusual cross. A pillar piscina - 72 cm high - also dating to the first half of the 12th century, was dug from the floor of the chancel when the foundations for a new south aisle were made in 1864.
- Above the chancel arch are painted boards depicting the Day of Judgement known as 'Doom Pictures', dated around 1570, a rarity as very few survived the Reformation. It consists of 11 oak panels of different sizes and shapes, crudely painted in tempera in red, green, black and white. A central crucifix, among other parts, is missing. They were discovered in about 1893 when a Mr Birtles bought them from a carpenter's yard in Kingston. At the time they were obscured by whitewash and paint. They were further restored in the 20th century by Alastair Stewart. The church would have been full of colour at the time the rood was painted, with striped and chevroned columns, and walls with paintings of the Passion and other religious subjects.

The mid-16th-century Forde brass

- St Nicholas contains a fine monument and brass to Erasmus Forde. The monument is of stone, with two bays in the forms of a six-poster, possibly designed to contain two kneeling effigies. The Forde brass was previously attached to the monument but is now alongside it. It depicts the kneeling figures of Erasmus Forde in armour, his wife Julyan, and their 12 daughters and six sons. A separate brass, commemorating the deaths of Erasmus and Julyan Forde, is notable as being one of the earliest depictions of the phrase "Que Sera, Sera" (here in the form of an armorial motto).
- In 1676, William Hatton, a would-be patriarch and village squire, had a family burial chapel built alongside the church. It was boldly labelled DORMITORIUM HATTONIANUM, and some of his local family were buried in it. However it decayed and was rebuilt as a vestry in 1781. A Hatton bequest gave financial support to several vicars of Thames Ditton.
- The bells were mentioned in an inventory of 1552 and were increased to six in number in 1753. They were recast in 1962 and re-hung in a new frame in 1981.
- The east window is 20th-century, set in 14th-century tracery by Geoffrey Webb and depicts St Nicholas.
- Other windows are by Lavers, Barraud and Westlake, such as "The Three Maries at the Sepulchre", St John the Baptist and St Mary Magdalene windows in the south chapel, and St Augustine and St Nicholas at the west end of the south aisle.

== Gallery ==
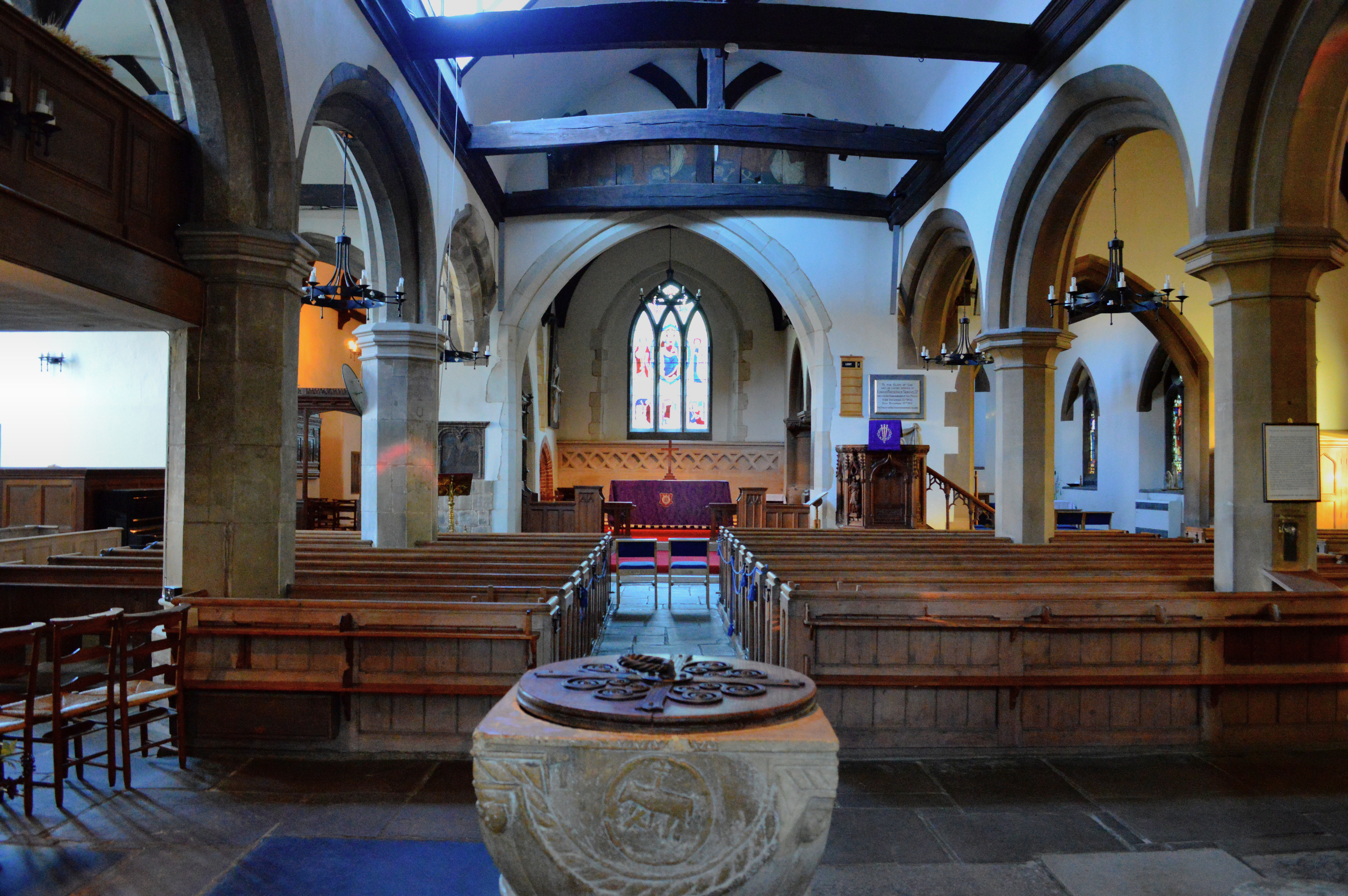
Interior

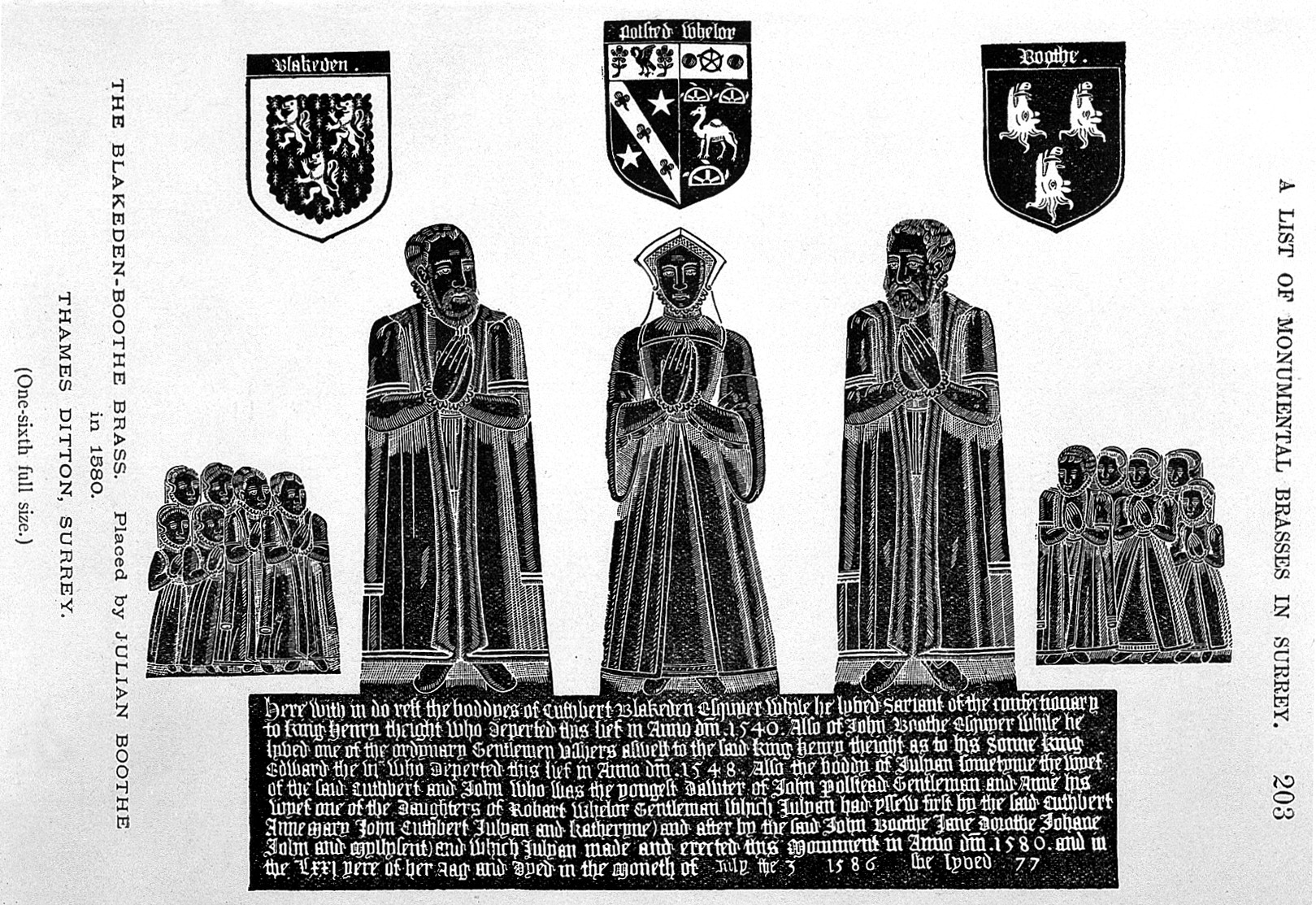
Blakeden-Boothe Brass

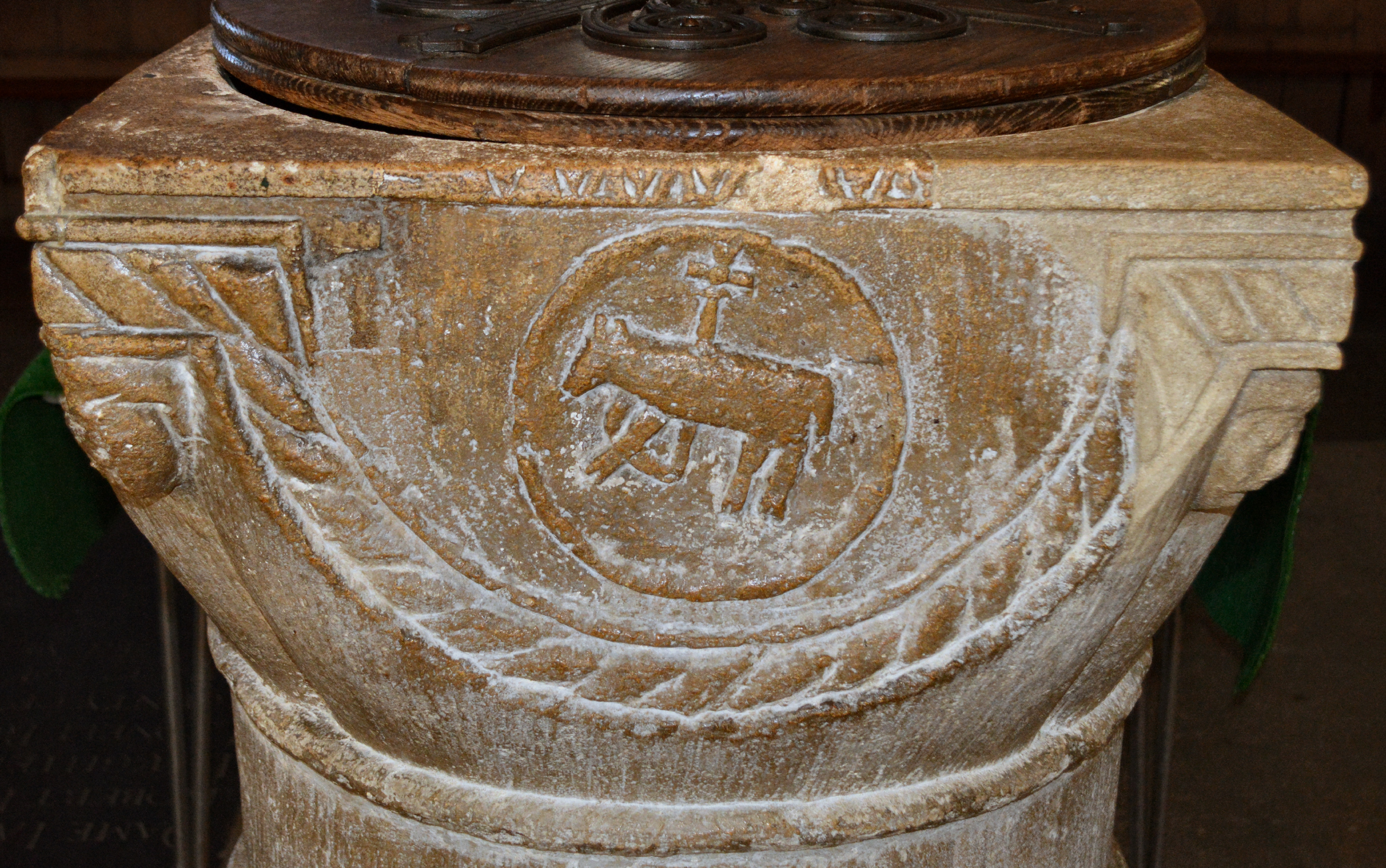
The font
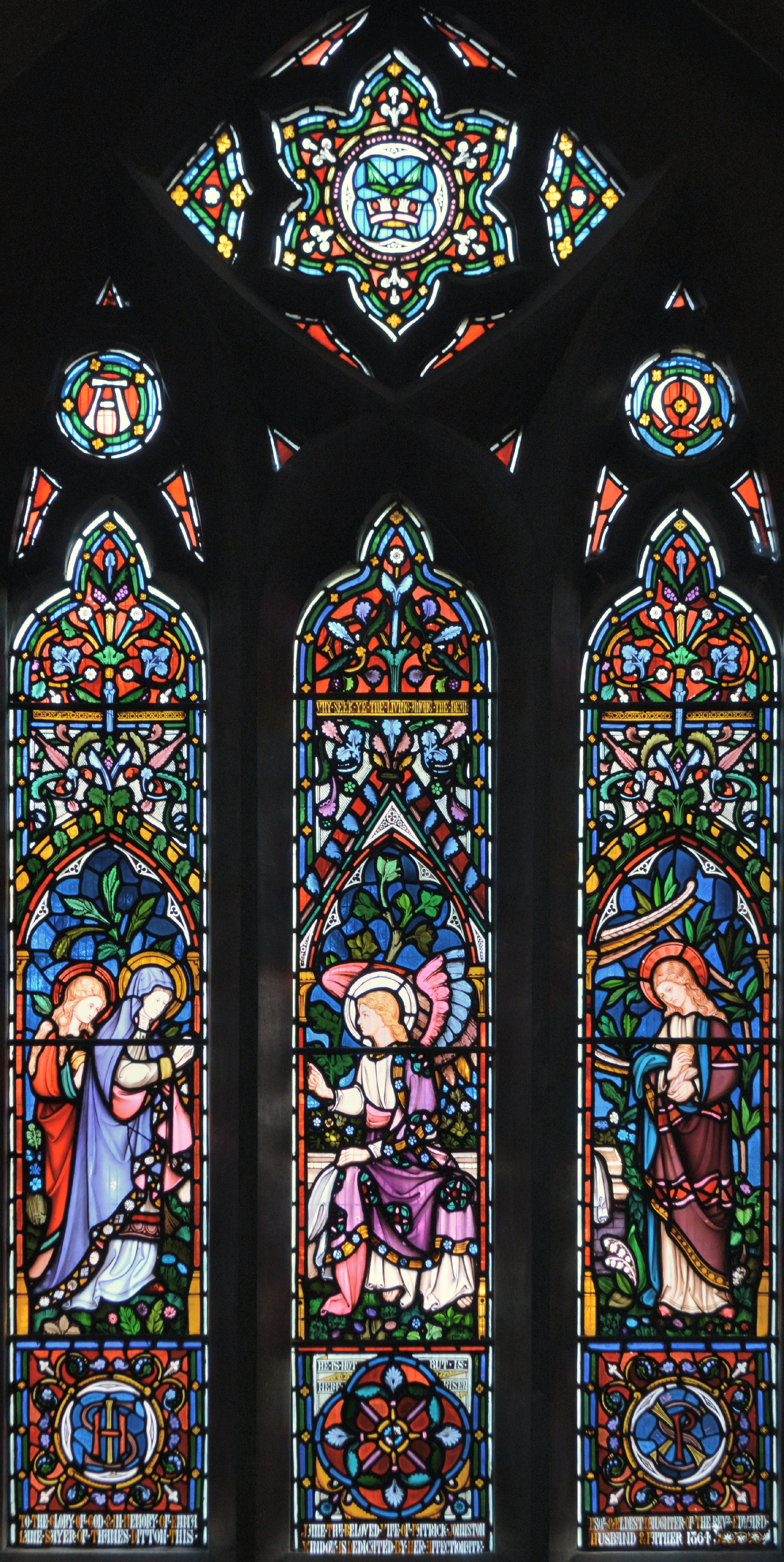
The Three Marys window

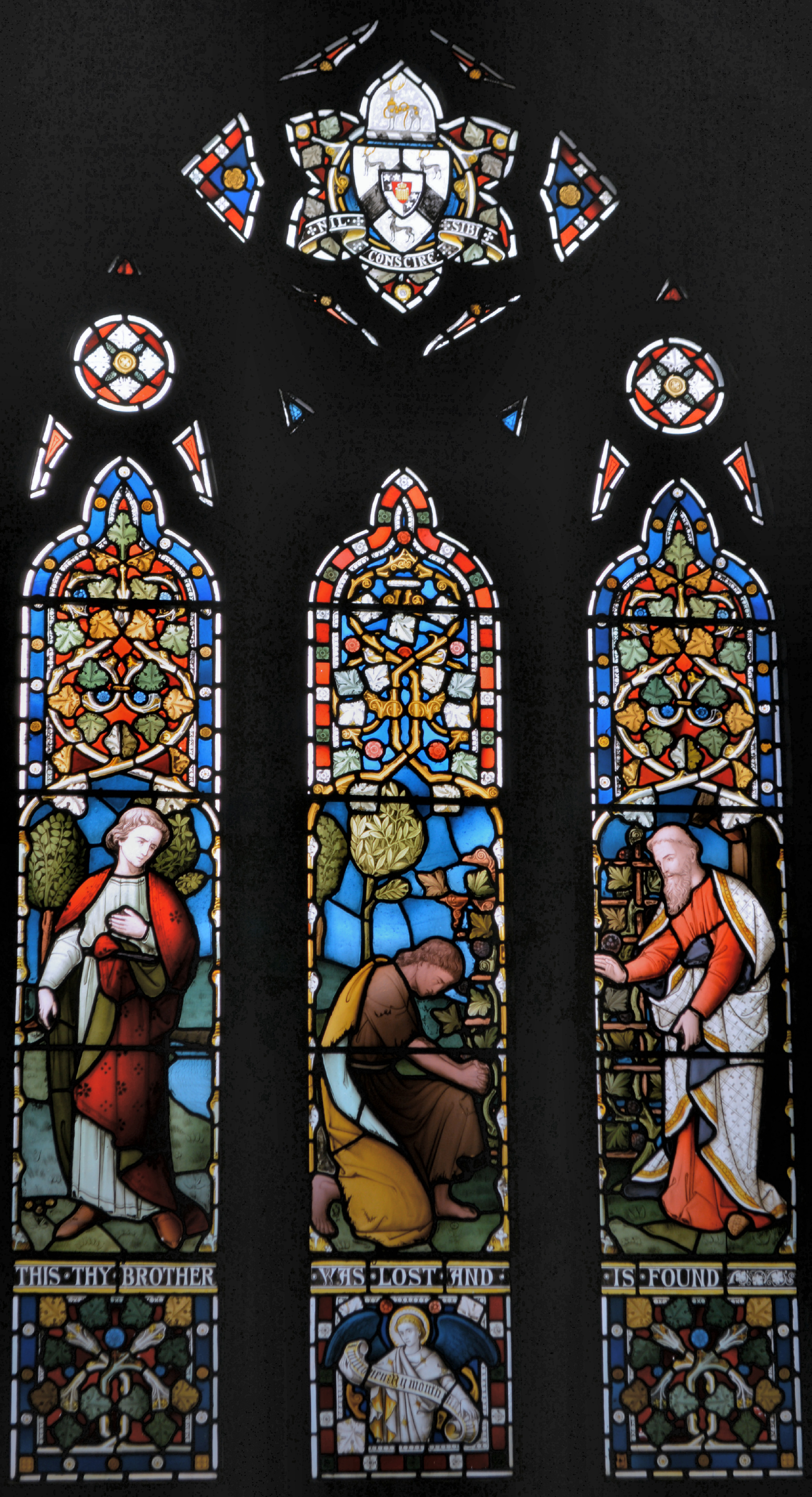
The Prodigal Son window

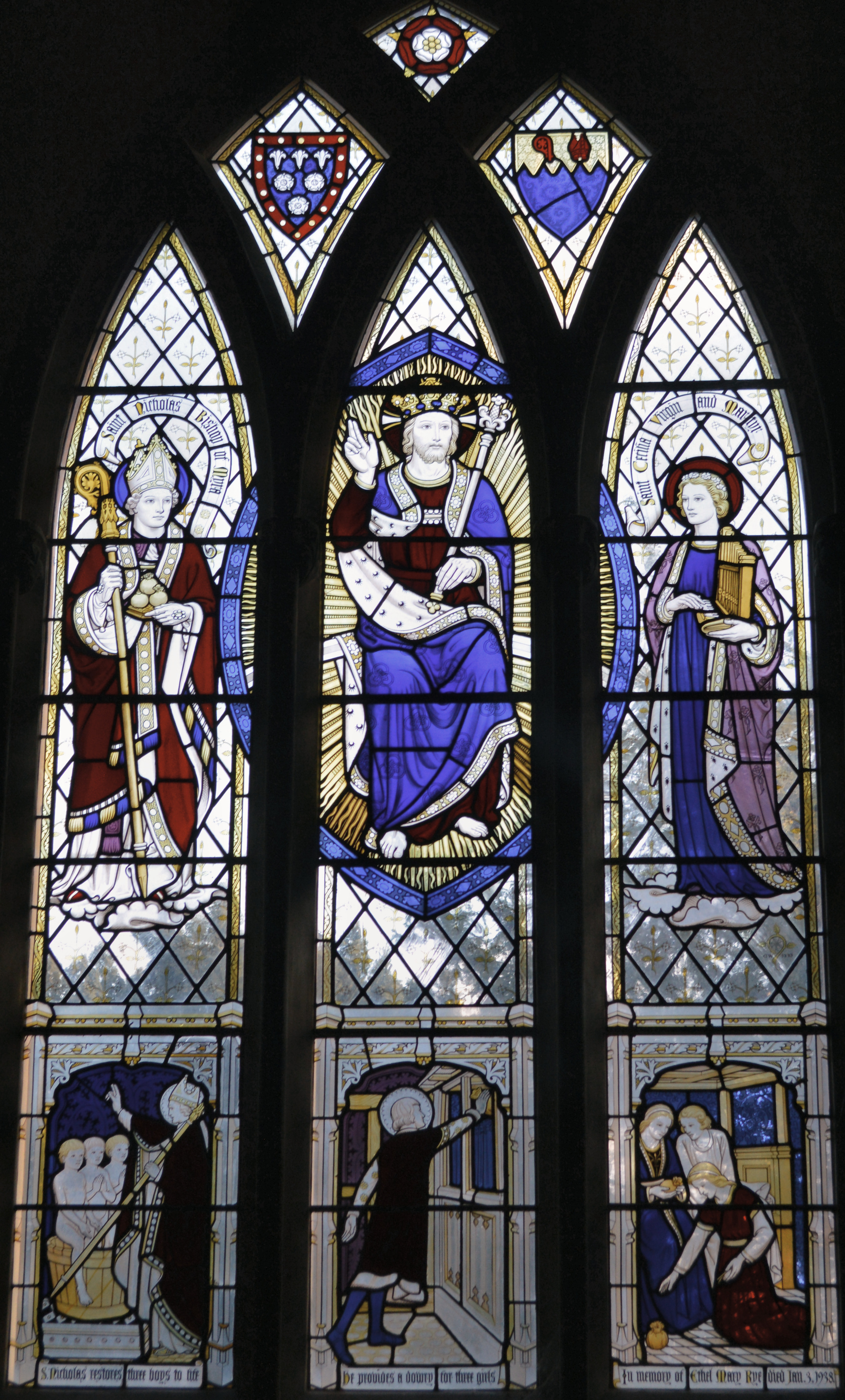
East window

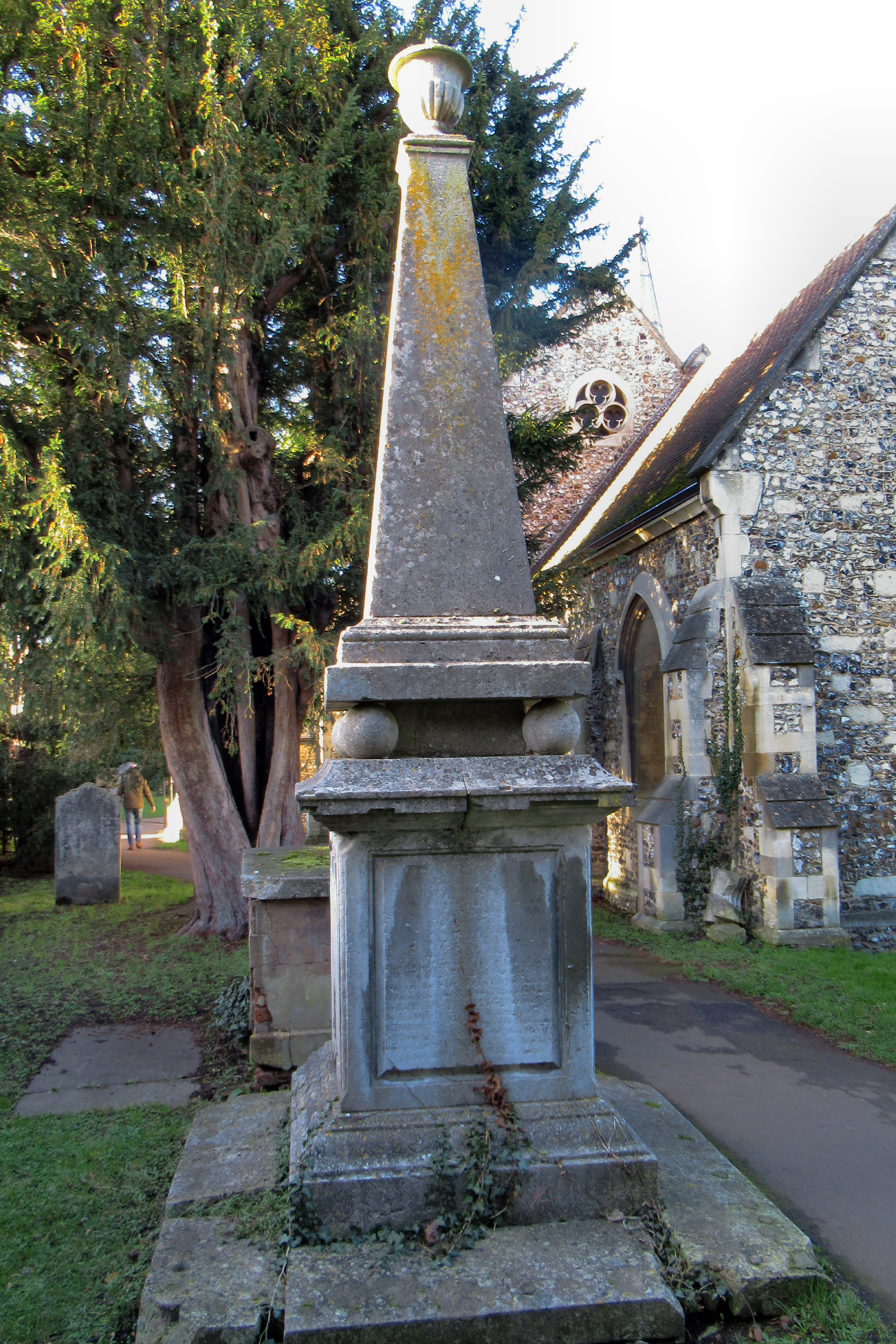
The Johnson obelisk

== See also ==
- List of places of worship in Elmbridge

== Notes and references ==
Notes
