= Phene (disambiguation) =

A phene is an individual genetically determined characteristic or trait which can be possessed by an organism.

Phene may also refer to:

- Phène, a historical name for benzene, proposed by Auguste Laurent
- John Samuel Phene, British architect
- The Phene, a pub in Chelsea, designed by the above
- Phene (mythology), queen in Greek mythology
