= 1859 revival =

The 1859 revival may refer to a number of different Christian revivals:

- 1859 Ulster revival
- 1859 Welsh revival
- The 1857–59 revival in the United States, considered to be the start of the Third Great Awakening
