= Oakley Street, Chelsea =

Street in Chelsea, London

Coordinates: 51°29′0.73″N 0°10′2.3″W

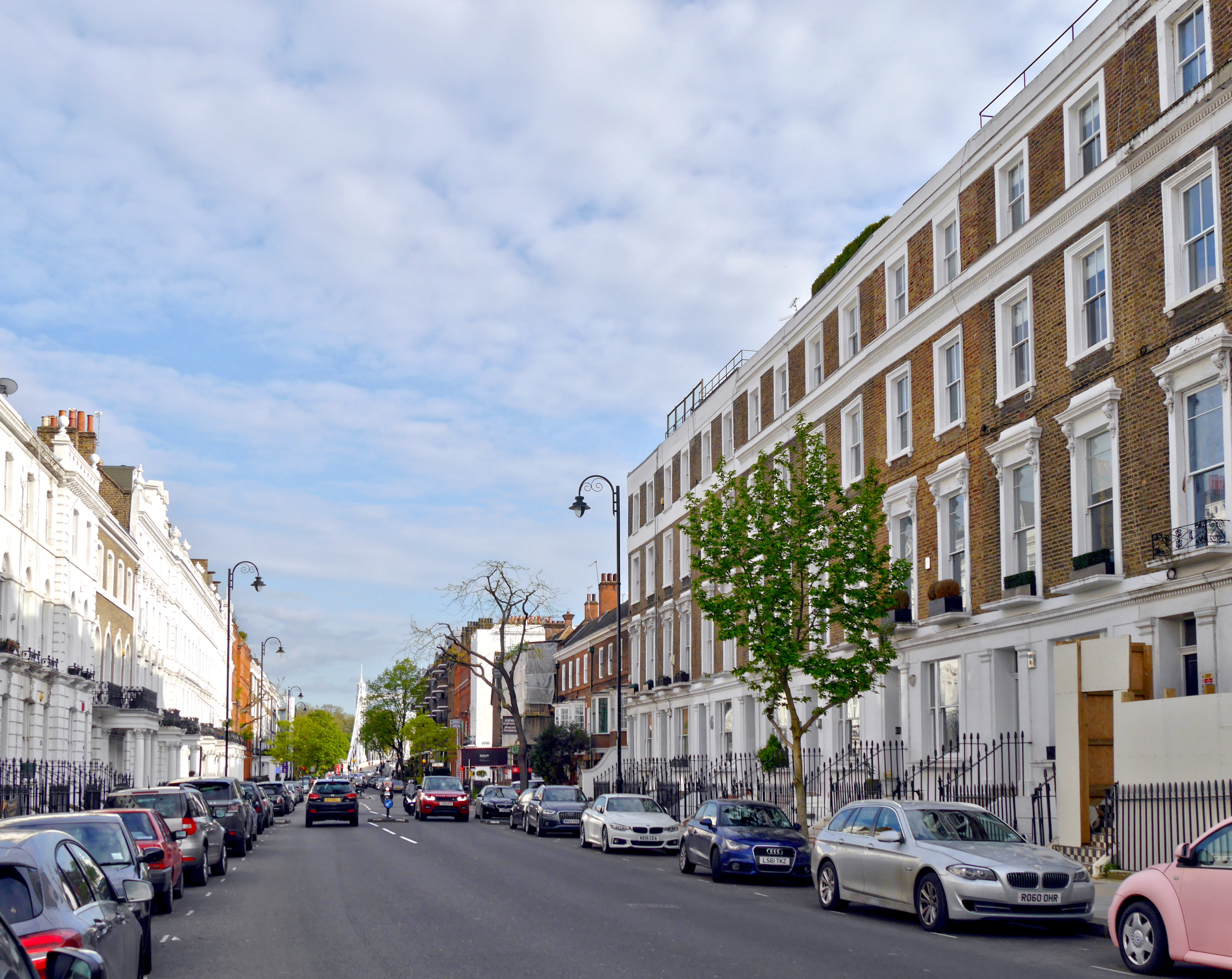
Oakley Street looking south, May 2018.

Oakley Street is in the Royal Borough of Kensington and Chelsea, London. It runs roughly north to south from King's Road to the crossroads with Cheyne Walk and the River Thames, where it continues as the Albert Bridge and Albert Bridge Road. The street was named after Baron Cadogan of Oakley.

== History ==
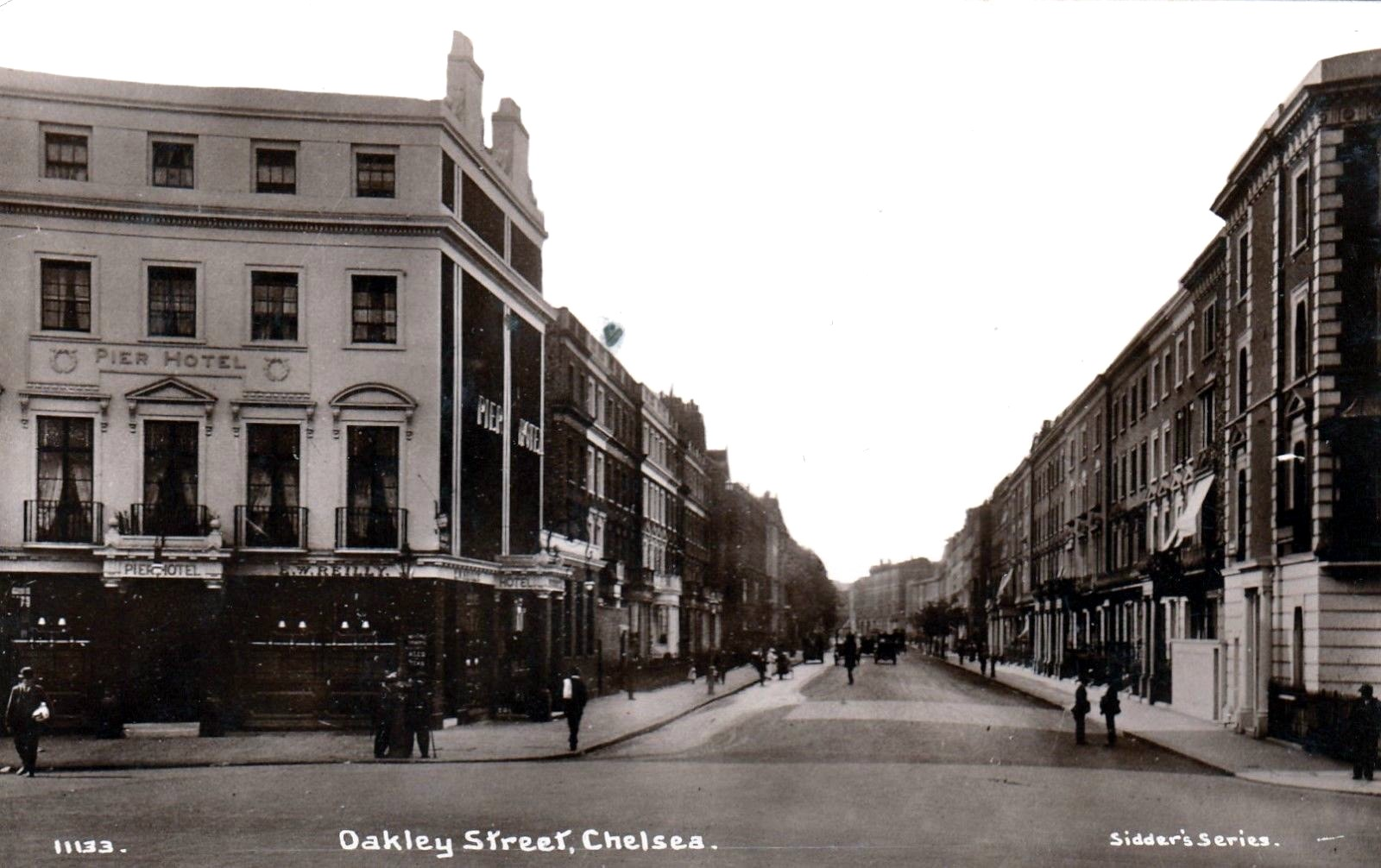
Postcard showing Oakley Street and the Pier Hotel, c. 1910

Much of the street is on the site of the former Winchester House, the one-time residence of the Bishops of Winchester in London who had bought the 17th-century part of Chelsea Place from Charles Cheyne in 1664 after the destruction of Winchester Palace in the English Civil War. In 1821, after the house fell into disrepair, the bishop successfully sought an Act that allowed him to sell the house and its ground of 2.5 acres to the trustees of the Cadogan Estate. In 1825, the trustees obtained a further Act to demolish the property and build new houses on the site. Demolition was complete by 1836, but the site was still vacant in 1847. By 1850, there were ten houses at the northern end, and four at the southern by 1851.

== Notable buildings ==
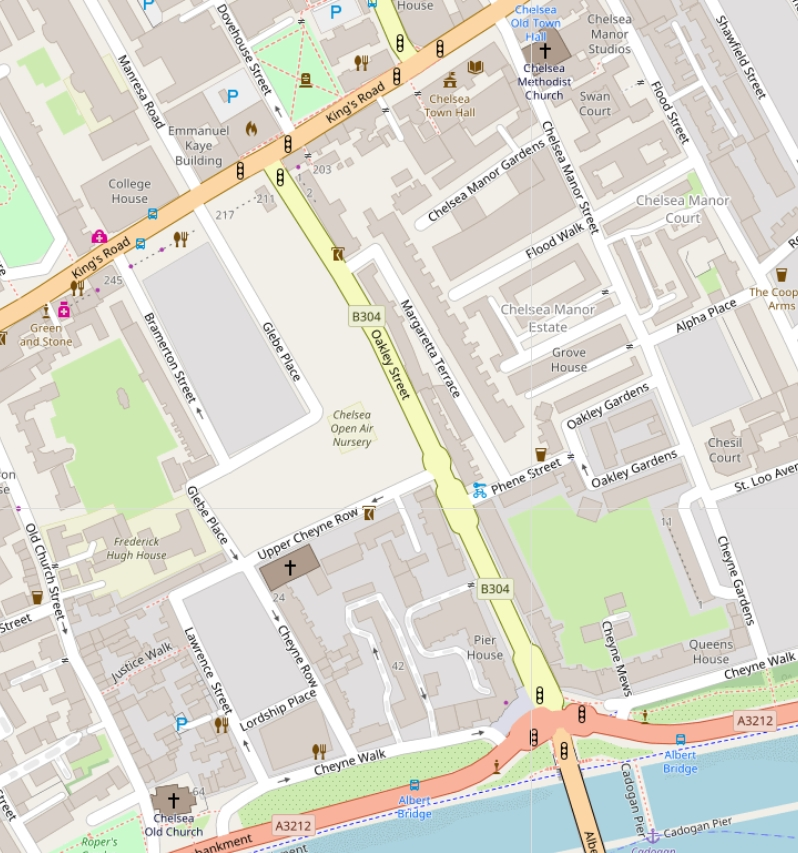
Oakley Street area map (centre vertically)

Numbers 1–11, 14–25, 26 and 27, 28–35 and 101–108 Oakley Street are listed grade II on the National Heritage List for England.

== Notable residents ==
No. 2 was owned by John Samuel Phene, a noted property developer and local eccentric.

No. 9 was the home of pianist Angus Morrison, where he was visited in the 1920s by Sergei Diaghilev, Constant Lambert and William Walton to run through ballet scores.

No. 29 was lived in by Donald Maclean, one of the Cambridge Five spy ring, in the latter 1930s.

No. 33 was the home of The Times chief music critic Robin Legge during the 1920s and early 1930s.

No. 42 was where Bob Marley moved to with his wife Rita in January 1977, following an attempt on his life in Jamaica.

No. 56 was the home of Antarctic explorer Robert Falcon Scott from 1904 to 1908, together with his mother and sister.

No. 57 was occupied by the 13th Duke of St Albans in the 1960s.

No. 59 was used in 1926 as lodgings by composer Constant Lambert, who rented out two rooms.

No. 74 was home to actress Dame Sybil Thorndike and her husband Lewis Casson in the 1930s.

No. 87 was home to Oscar Wilde's mother Jane Wilde from 1886 until she died here in 1896. Oscar Wilde stayed here in April 1895, just before his trial at the Old Bailey. Many years later, the footballer George Best also lived here.

No. 89 was the home of David Bowie from 1973 to at least 1976.

No. 93 was home to suffragettes in 1911, who refused to complete the 1911 census on the grounds of "no vote no census". However, the enumerator was able to confirm from the neighbours that the head of the house was Mrs Alice Monck Mason, who lived there with her daughter, Winifred Alice Monck Mason (and others), an actress who went by the name of Winifred Mayo.

== Gallery ==
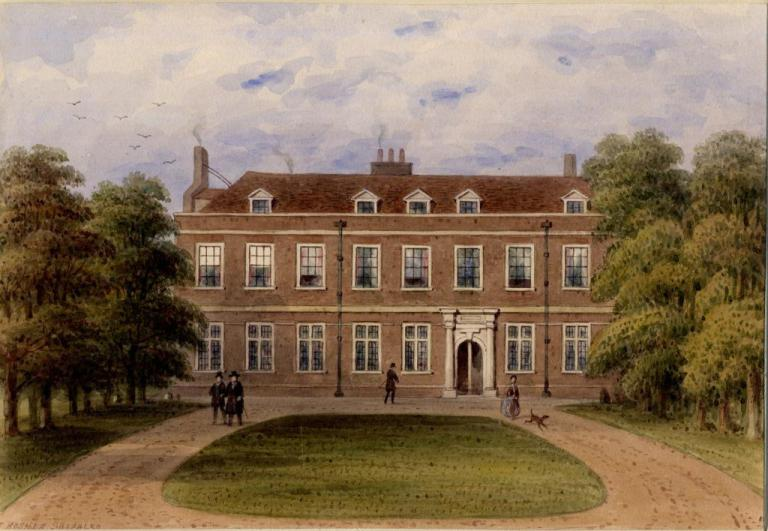
Winchester House by Thomas Hosmer Shepherd

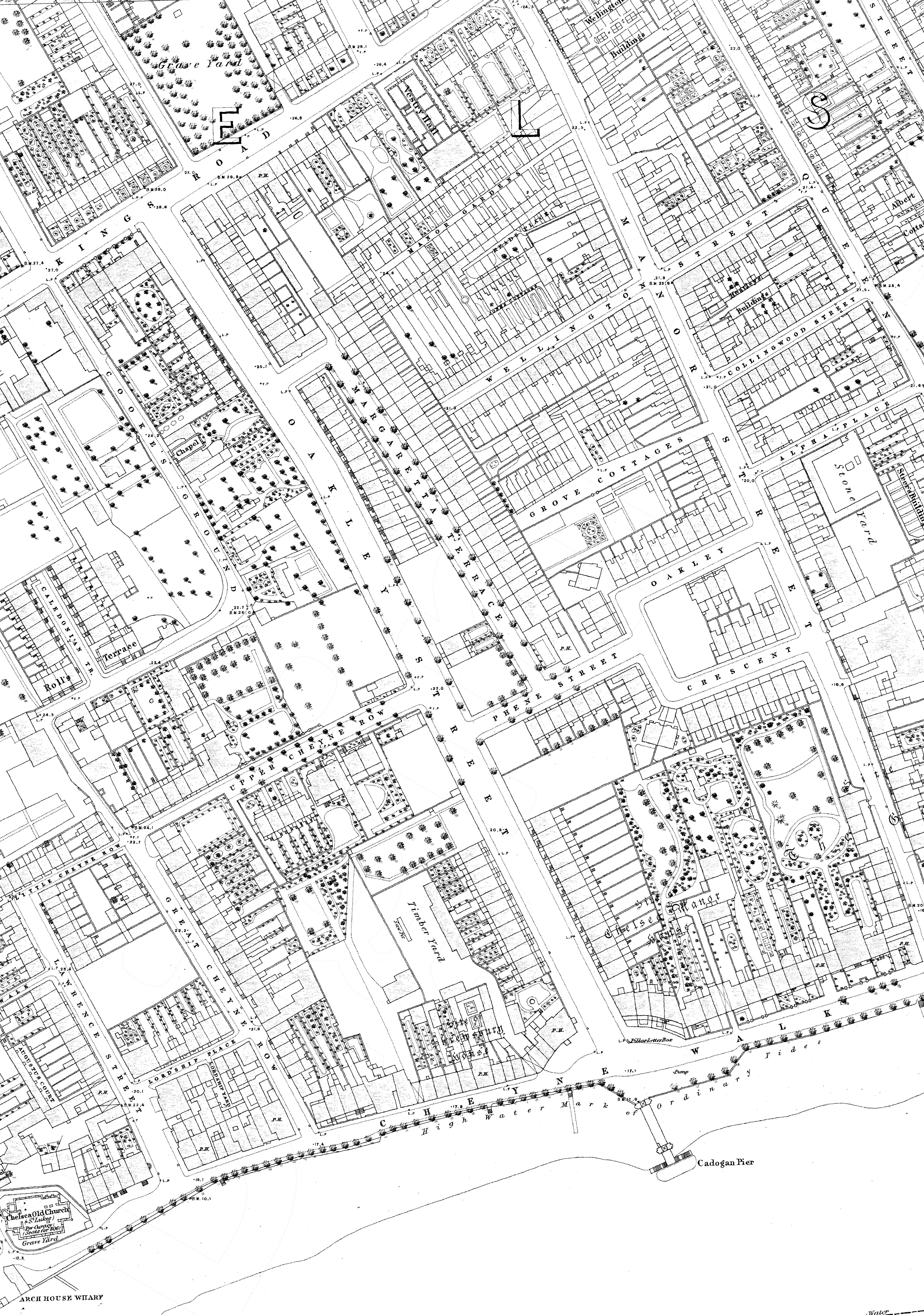
1868 Ordnance Survey map

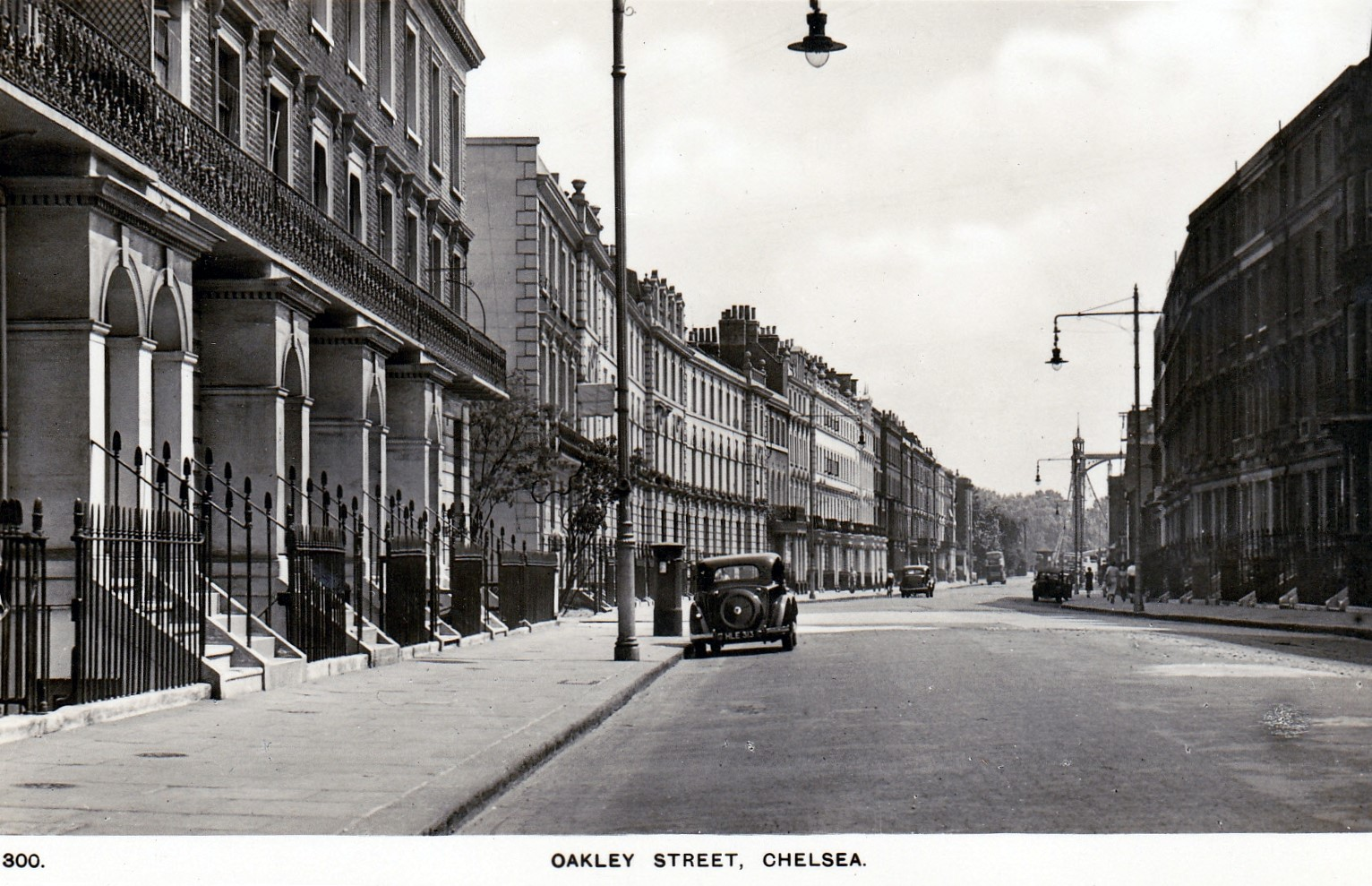
Oakley Street, c.1930.

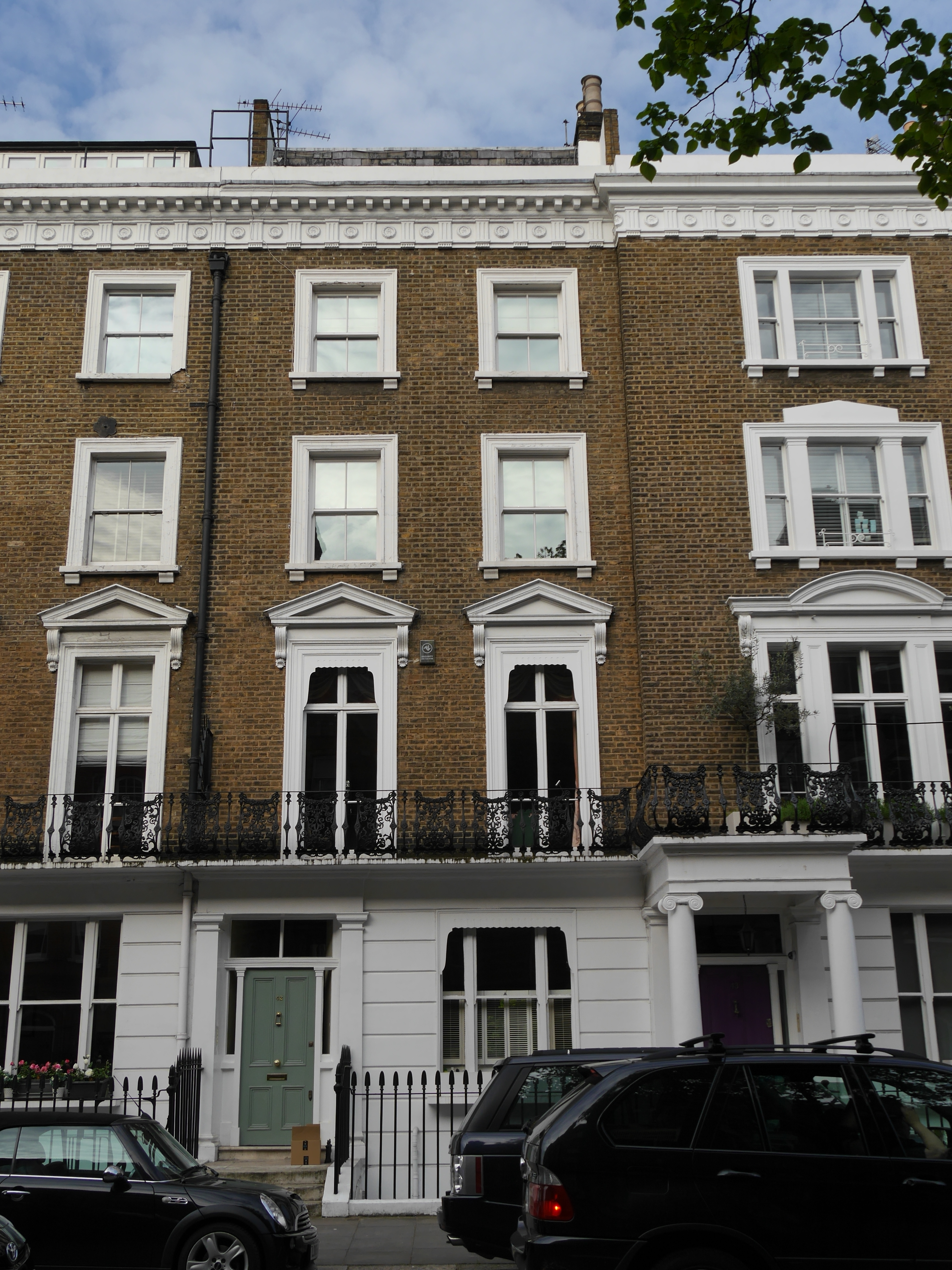
No. 42, briefly the home of Bob Marley after an attempt on his life

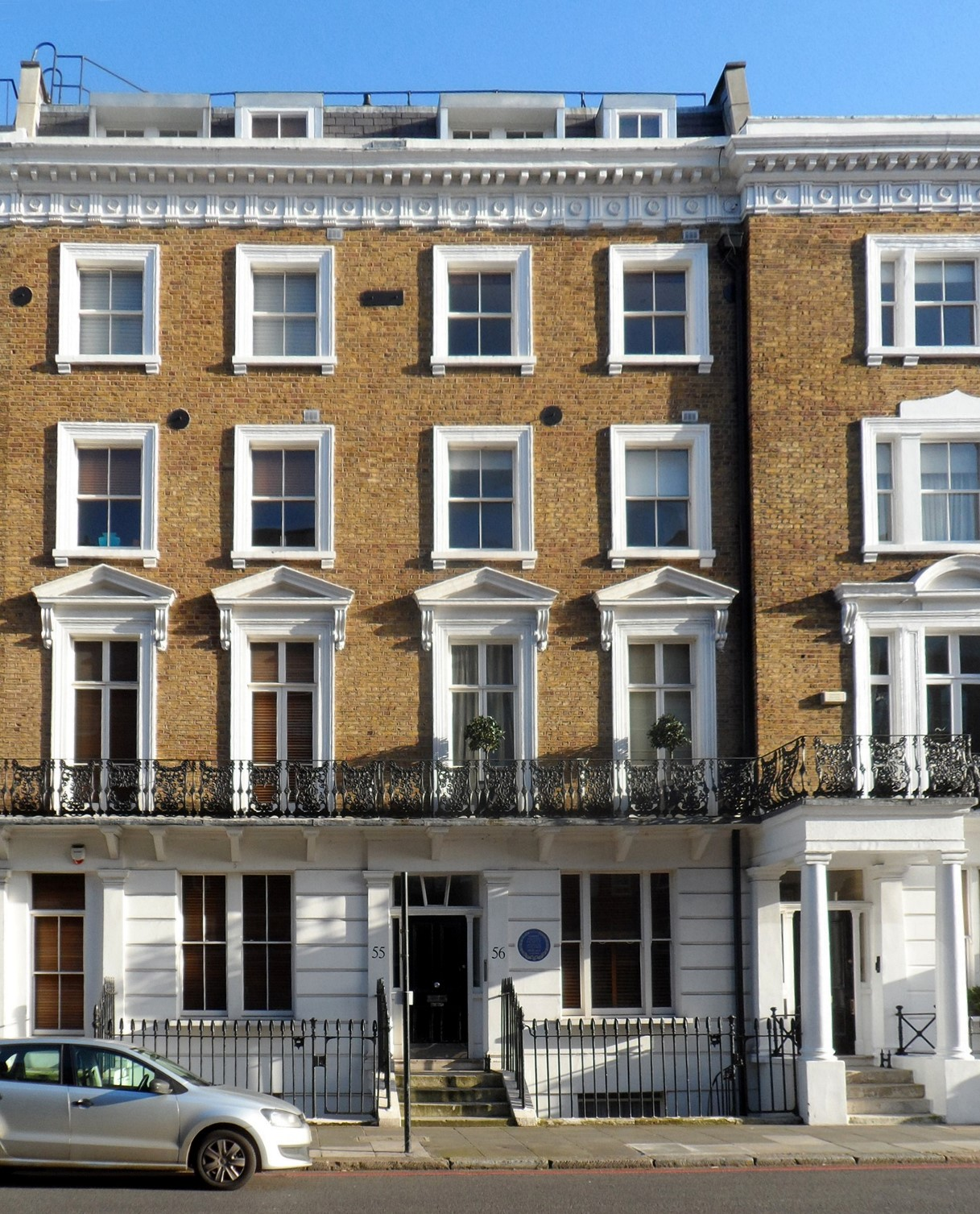
No. 56, former home of Robert Falcon Scott

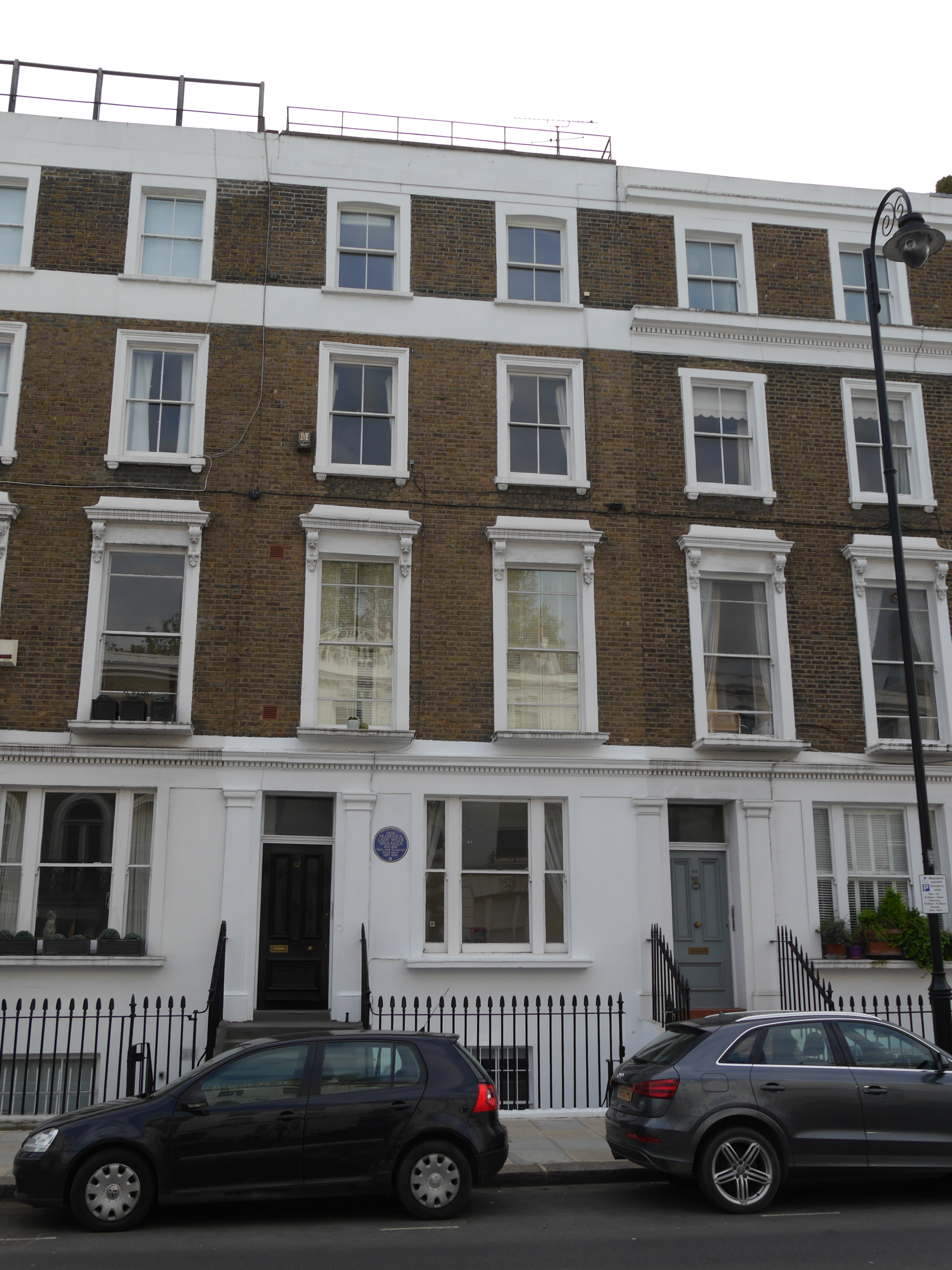
No. 87, former home of Oscar Wilde and later George Best

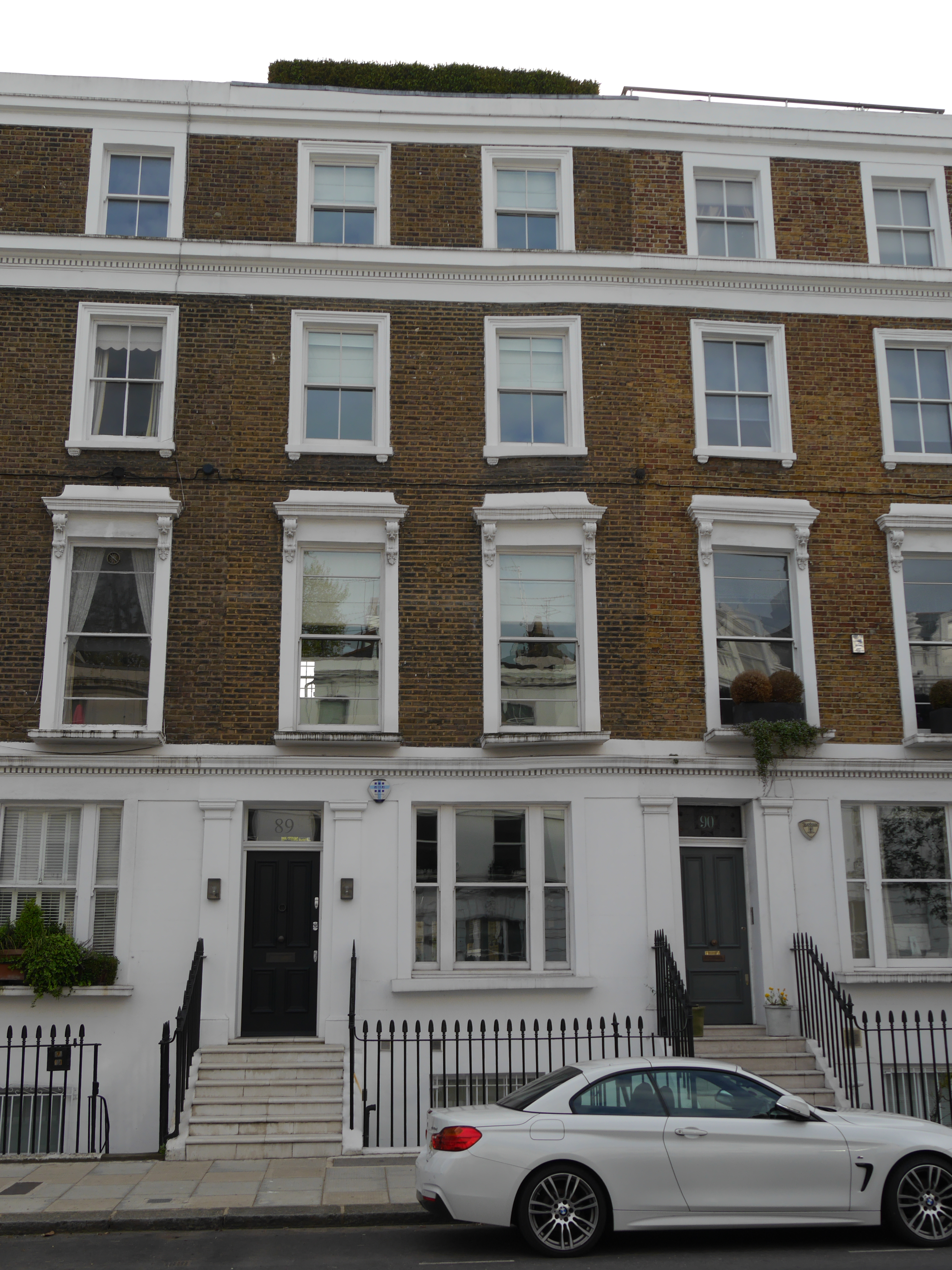
No. 89, former home of David Bowie in the 1970s

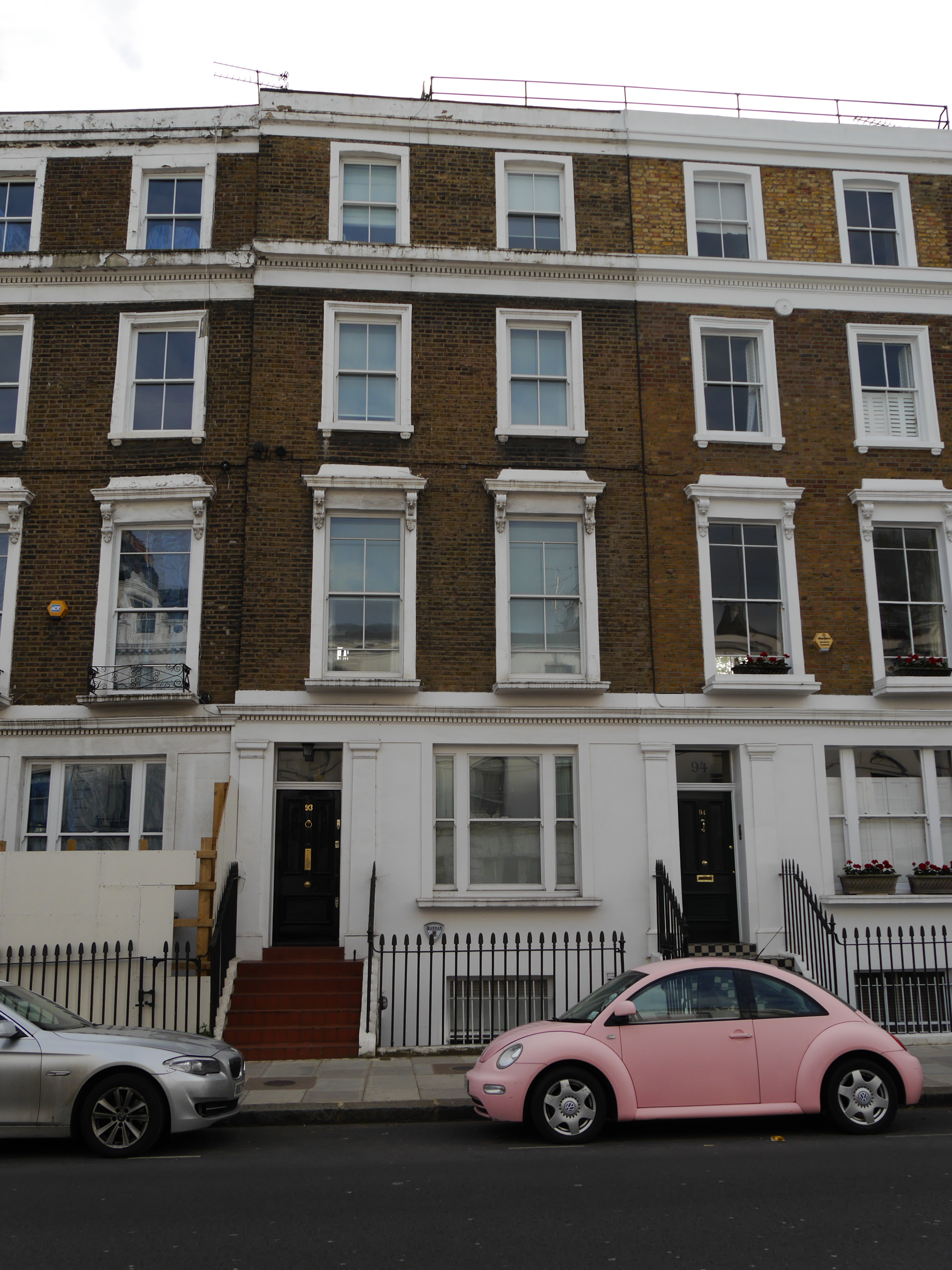
No. 93, where suffragettes refused to answer the census in 1911
