= Brownlow North (evangelist) =

English evangelist

- Born: 6 January 1810; Chelsea, London, England
- Died: 9 November 1875 (aged 65); Alexandria, Dunbartonshire, Scotland
- Occupations: Evangelist, preacher, writer

Brownlow North (6 January 1810 – 9 November 1875) was an English evangelist.

== Life ==
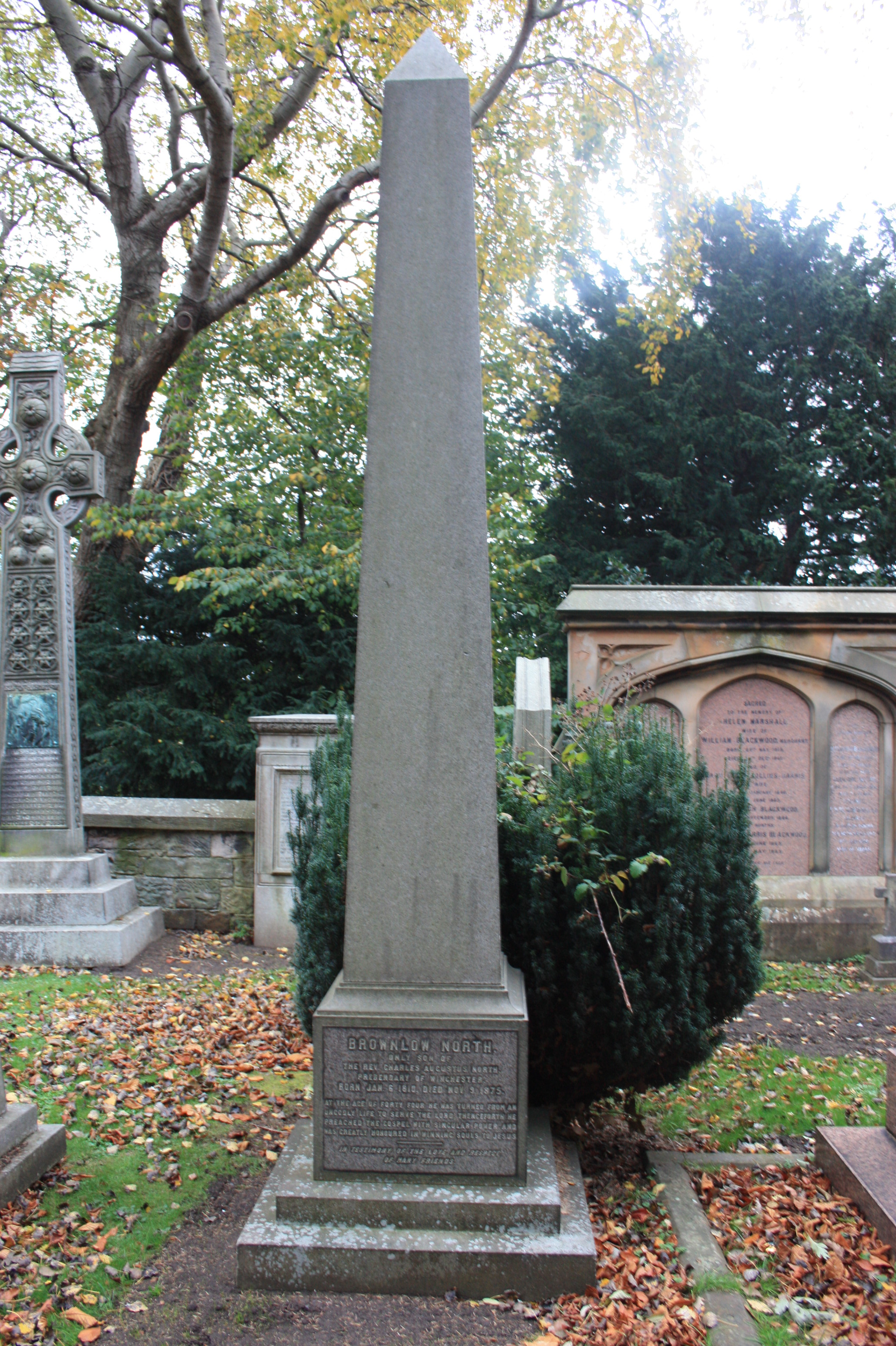
The grave of Brownlow North, Dean Cemetery, Edinburgh

North was born in Winchester House, Chelsea the only son of Rev Charles Augustus North. He was the grandson of Brownlow North, Bishop of Winchester. When he was born, he was in line to receive the earldom of Guilford, since the current earl, Frederick North, 5th Earl of Guilford, had no son, and neither did Brownlow's uncle, Francis North. However, due to Brownlow's "youthful extravagances", Francis remarried on the death of his wife, and did have a son, thus denying Brownlow the earldom.

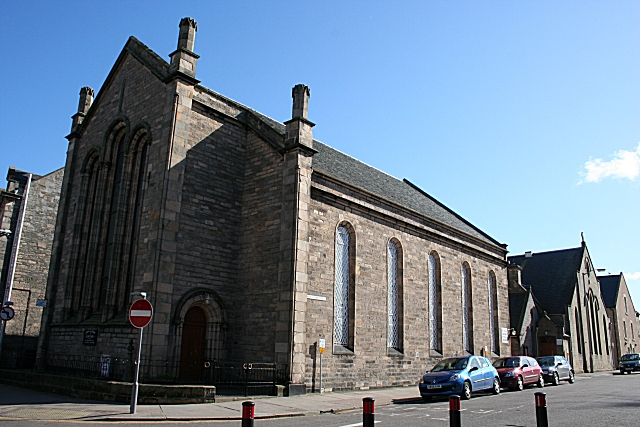
Elgin High Kirk, where North began to attend after his conversion.

North was educated at Eton College. He lived for a while with his great uncle Frederick on Corfu, and fought with Dom Pedro's army in Portugal, before eventually settling in Scotland. North lived a life of pleasure, being fond of hunting and gambling, broken only by a period at Magdalen Hall, Oxford, when he considered taking holy orders.

North experienced a religious conversion in November 1854, and began to attend Elgin Free Church. He proceeded to engage in public preaching. In 1859, he was appointed as an evangelist by the Free Church of Scotland. Moody-Stuart suggests that he gained in this an "express recognition" for lay-effort "such as it had not obtained since the period immediately succeeding the Reformation."

North was a significant figure in the 1859 Ulster revival. On one occasion he preached to 12,000 people at Newtonlimavady. Rabbi Duncan once remarked on seeing a photograph of him, "There is intellect in the brow, genius in the eye, and eloquence in the mouth."

He died on 9 November 1875 and is buried in Dean Cemetery in western Edinburgh. The grave lies on the southern path, towards the west.
