= Brownlow North =

British bishop (1741–1820)

The Right Reverend Brownlow North
- Bishop of Winchester
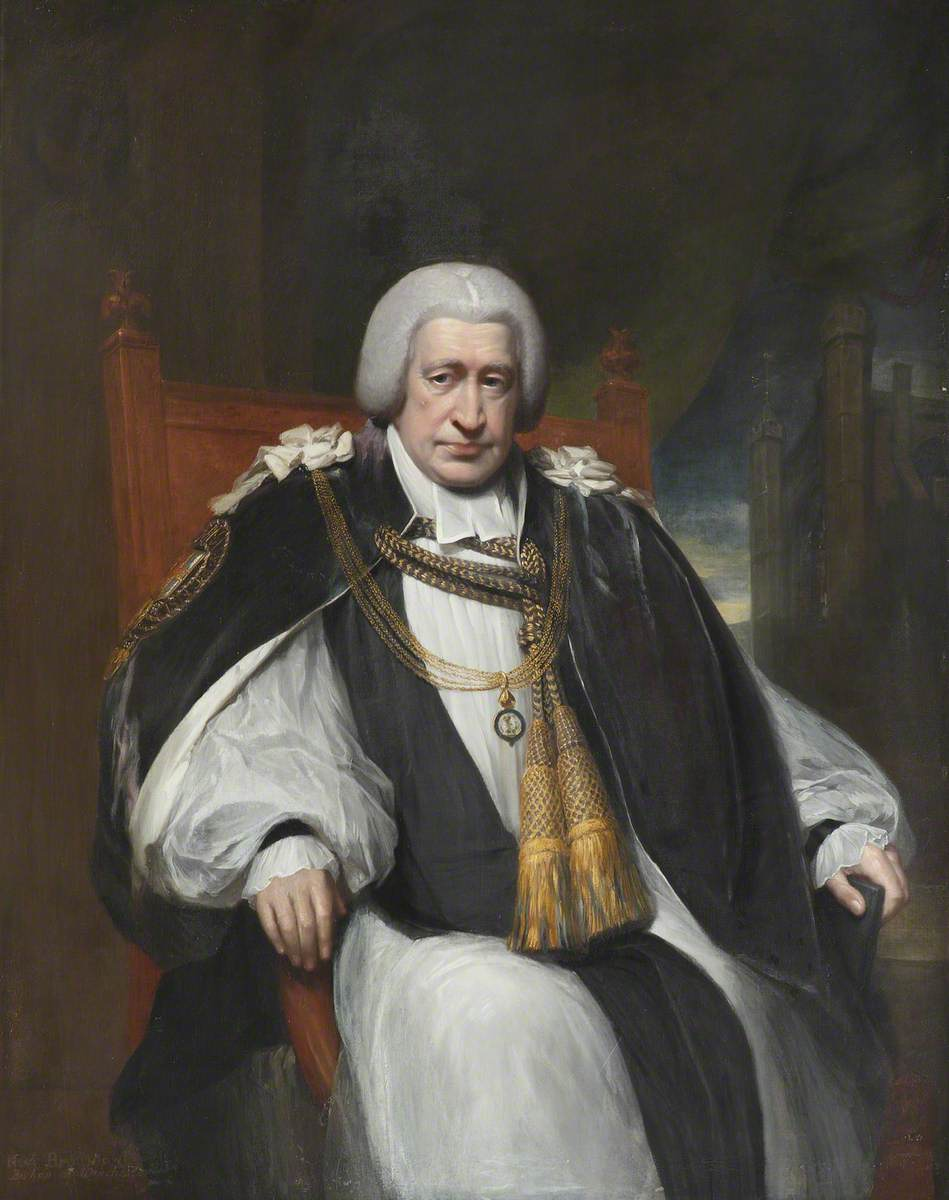
- Portrait by Henry Howard, 1818
- Diocese: Diocese of Winchester
- In office: 1781–1820
- Predecessor: John Thomas
- Successor: George Pretyman Tomline
- Other posts: Canon of Christ Church (1768–1770); Dean of Canterbury (1770–1771); Bishop of Lichfield and Coventry (1771–1774); Bishop of Worcester (1774–1781); Prelate, Order of the Garter (ex officio as Bishop of Winchester)

Personal details
- Born: 17 July 1741 Chelsea, Middlesex, Great Britain
- Died: 12 July 1820 (aged 78) Chelsea, Middlesex, United Kingdom
- Buried: Winchester Cathedral, 1820
- Denomination: Anglican
- Residence: Winchester House, Chelsea (at death)
- Parents: Francis North, 1st Earl of Guilford & Elizabeth
- Spouse: Henrietta (m. 1771–1796)
- Children: incl. Francis, Charles
- Education: Trinity College, Oxford

Brownlow North (17 July 1741 – 12 July 1820) was a bishop of the Church of England.

== Early life, family and education ==
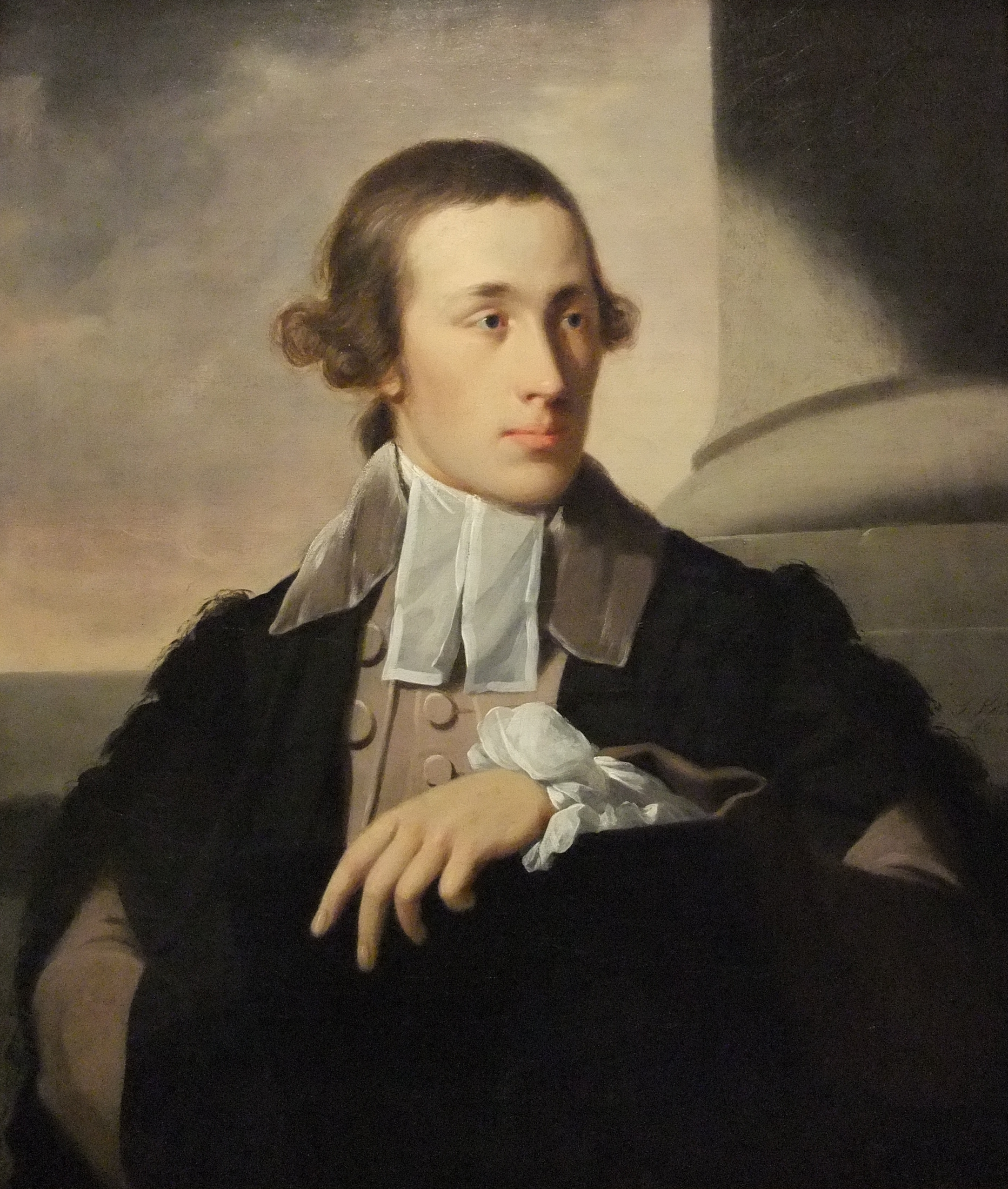
1763 portrait of North by Tilly Kettle

Brownlow North was born on 17 July 1741 in Chelsea, Middlesex, Great Britain, the only son of Francis North, 1st Earl of Guilford and his second wife Elizabeth, only child and sole heir of Sir Arthur Kaye Bt MP, and widow of her first husband George Legge, Viscount Lewisham (son of William Legge, 1st Earl of Dartmouth), therefore styled as the dowager Viscountess Lewisham until her second marriage.

North's maternal half-siblings included Anne, Countess of Cardigan (who married James Brudenell, 5th Earl of Cardigan), and William Legge, 2nd Earl of Dartmouth; his paternal half-siblings included Frederick North, Lord North, the future Prime Minister. His only full sibling was Louisa, Lady Willoughby de Broke (who married John Peyto-Verney, 14th Baron Willoughby de Broke).

He was educated at Eton College (1752–1759) and Trinity College, Oxford (where he matriculated on 10 January 1760 as a fellow-commoner), graduating as a Bachelor of Arts in 1762. He became a Fellow of All Souls College, Oxford in 1763, gaining his Master of Arts (Oxon) on 4 July 1766 and Doctor of Civil Law in 1770.

== Church career ==
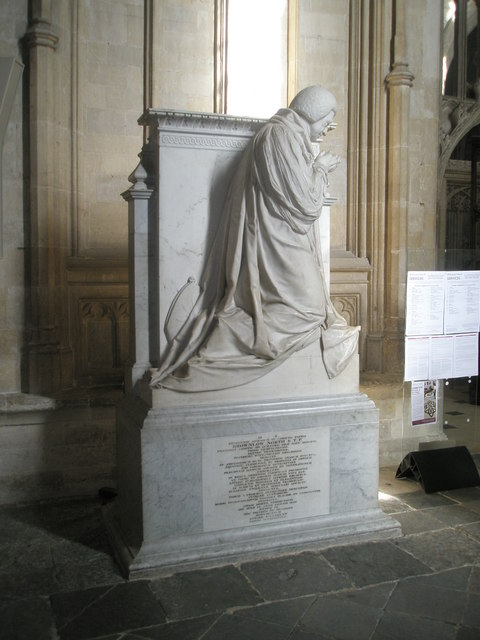
Memorial to North within Winchester Cathedral.

North was ordained a deacon at Christ Church by John Hume, Bishop of Oxford, on 27 October 1765 and priest at Grosvenor Chapel, Westminster by Frederick Cornwallis, Bishop of Lichfield and Coventry on 12 April 1767. Due to his family connections — his father was an influential courtier and his half-brother Frederick was to become Prime Minister of Great Britain — North’s career made substantial advances early and rapidly. His brother-in-law Willoughby de Broke presented him to the rectory of Lighthorne, then the crown presented him to the 4th prebend at Christ Church on 28 April 1768.

He remained a canon of Oxford until he was installed as Dean of Canterbury on 6 October 1770; while there he obtained the lucrative livings of Lydd and Bexley, both of which he retained while at Lichfield. North left Canterbury for Lichfield in 1771, when his half-brother the Prime Minister's recommendation saw him elected Bishop of Lichfield and Coventry. His election to that see having been confirmed on 26 August 1771, he was consecrated a bishop by Frederick Cornwallis, Archbishop of Canterbury (with Richard Terrick, Bishop of London; Zachary Pearce, Bishop of Rochester; and William Markham Bishop of Chester) on 8 September 1771 at Lambeth Palace chapel

North was Bishop of Lichfield for three years before his election as Bishop of Worcester was confirmed on 27 December 1774; he then remained in Worcester for six and a half years until his election to the See of Winchester was confirmed on 5 June 1781. Throughout the period of his appointments to these two Sees his half-brother remained Prime Minister.

North was enthroned (by proxy) at Winchester Cathedral on 25 June 1781 and continued as Bishop of Winchester until his death, following a long illness, at Winchester House, Chelsea on 12 July 1820. He was then buried at his cathedral on 21 August 1820. The monument was sculpted by Francis Chantrey.

== Marriage and family ==
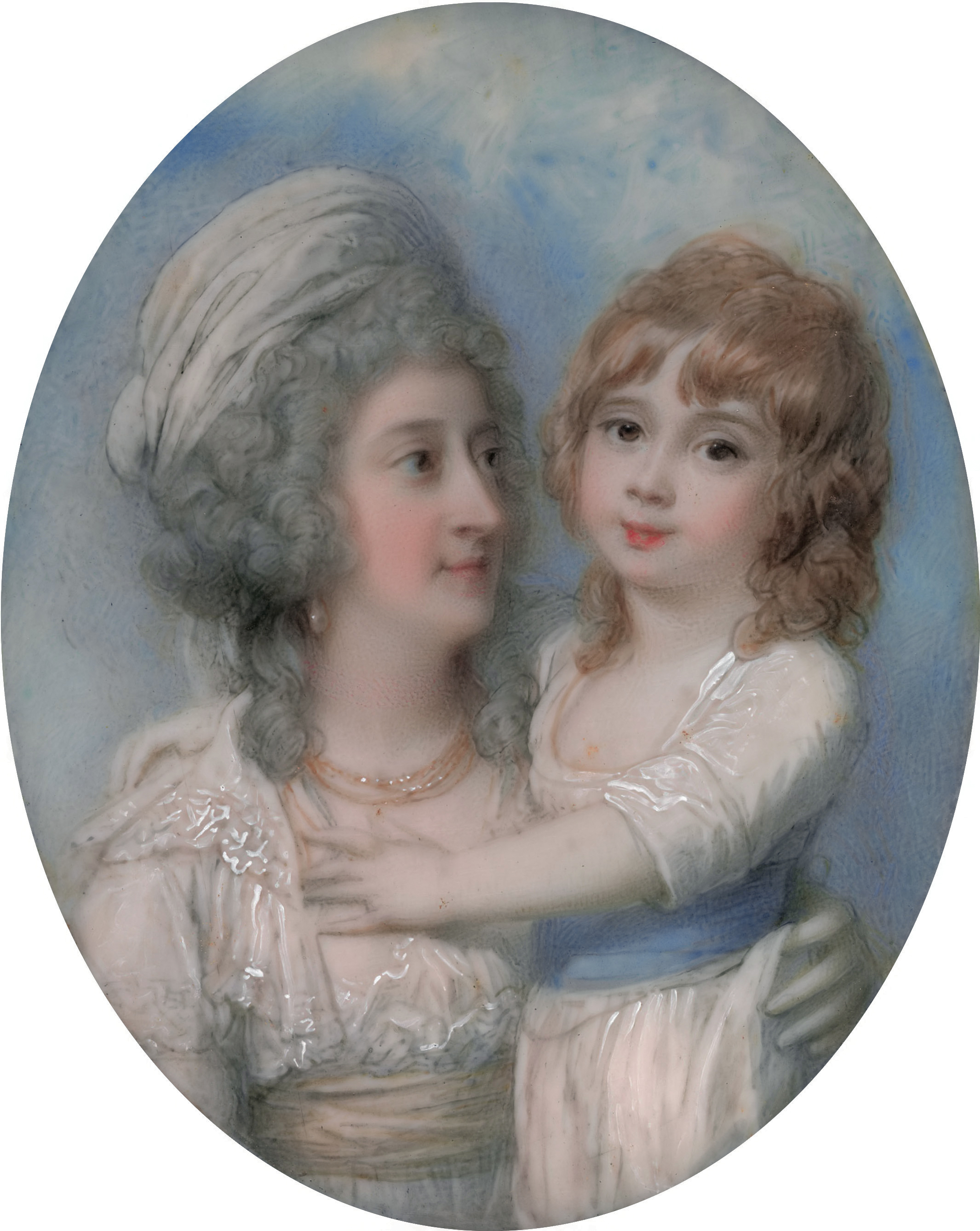
Mrs Brownlow North with her son Charles Augustus North (1785-1825) (Richard Cosway, 1791)

On 17 January 1771, North married Henrietta Maria Bannister, who died on 17 November 1796. His eldest son Francis North, 6th Earl of Guilford and his youngest Charles Augustus North both became Anglican priests; of his four daughters, one (Henrietta) married a priest and another (Elizabeth) married Thomas de Grey, 4th Baron Walsingham. The 19th century evangelist, also named Brownlow North was his grandson (Charles' son.)

== Styles and titles ==
- 1741–1765: The Honourable Brownlow North
- 1765–1768: The Reverend and Honourable Brownlow North
- 1768–1770: The Reverend and Honourable Canon Brownlow North
- 1770-1771: The Very Reverend and Honourable Brownlow North
- 1771–1820: The Right Reverend and Honourable Brownlow North

== Sources ==
- "North, Brownlow". Oxford Dictionary of National Biography (online ed.). Oxford University Press. doi:10.1093/ref:odnb/20292. (Subscription, Wikipedia Library access or UK public library membership required.)

Church of England titles
Preceded by John Potter	Dean of Canterbury; 1770–1771	Succeeded by John Moore
Preceded by John Egerton	Bishop of Lichfield and Coventry; 1771–1774	Succeeded by Richard Hurd
Preceded by James Johnson	Bishop of Worcester; 1774–1781	Succeeded by Richard Hurd
Preceded by John Thomas	Bishop of Winchester; 1781–1820	Succeeded by George Pretyman Tomline
