= Thomas Ogle =

English soldier

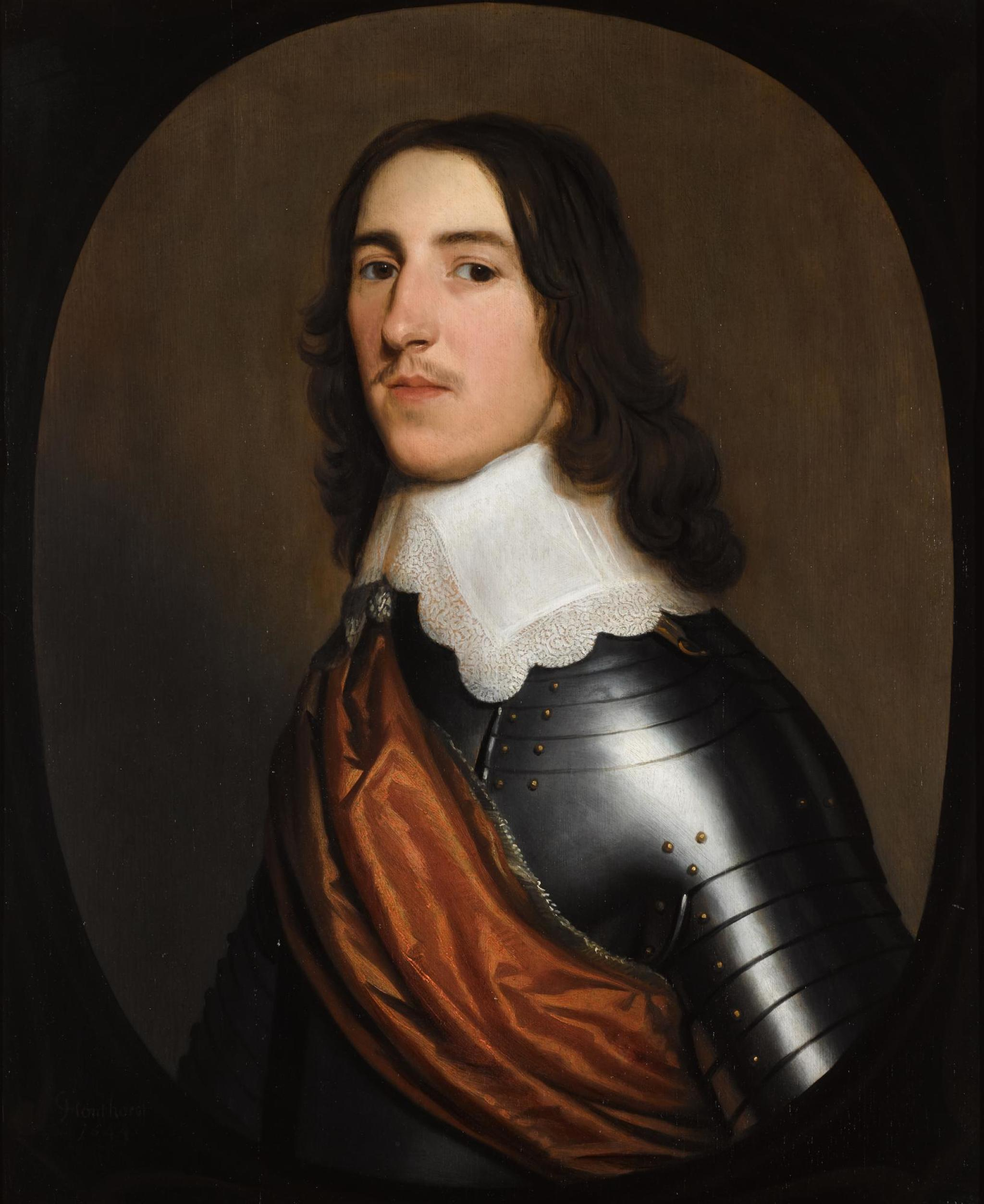
Portrait believed to be Thomas Ogle by Gerard van Honthorst

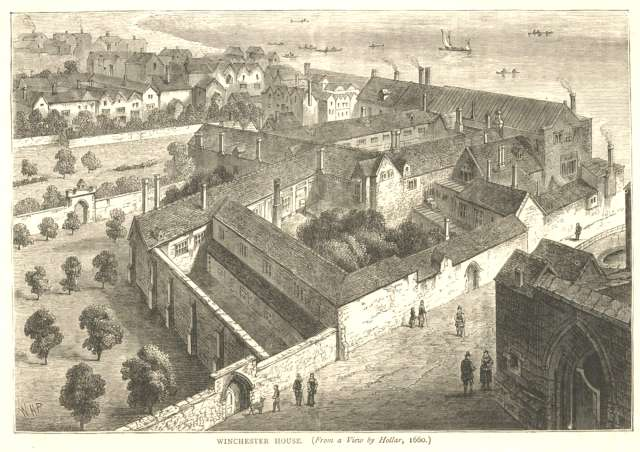
Winchester House around the time of Ogle's captivity (Wenceslas Hollar, 1660)

Sir Thomas Ogle was a sergeant-major involved in a plot to draw both Roman Catholics and Independents in an attempt to reconvene the English Parliament at Oxford, to the benefit of Charles I and the detriment of the Roundheads.

In 1643, Sir Thomas Ogle was being held prisoner in Winchester House when he contacted John Digby, 1st Earl of Bristol, a moderate royalist based with the King in Oxford. He suggested that London's Independents (advocates of Congregationalism) would be prepared to strike a deal with the King in return for religious toleration. This view had apparently been supported by Thomas Devenish, Keeper of Winchester House. Devenish was also a member of the congregation of John Goodwin, one of the most prominent Independent preachers. A letter from Ogle to Nicholas Crisp was intercepted and published. The plan then involved Ogle escaping with £100, with Devenish's collusion. However, when Lord Wharton reported matters to the House of Lords on 26 January 1644, it turned out that Devenish had apprised the Lords of the plot, a letter from the King to Devenish was revealed, and Devenish was thanked for exposing the plot. John Goodwin and fellow prominent Independent preacher, Philip Nye were also thanked for refusing "to meddle in the Business".
