= Winchester House, Chelsea =

Coordinates: 51°29′0.73″N 0°10′2.3″W

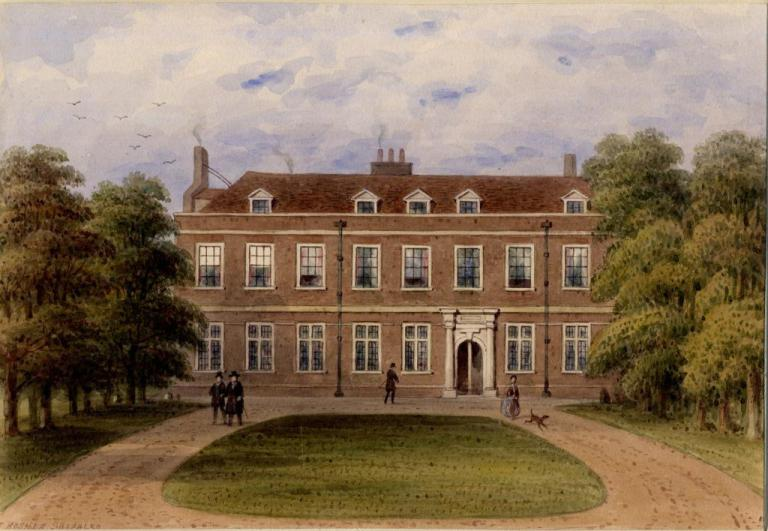
Winchester House by Thomas Hosmer Shepherd

Winchester House, demolished, housed the Bishops of Winchester from 1664 to the early 19th century when in London. Their diocese for this purpose had bought the 17th-century part of Chelsea Place from Charles Cheyne in 1664. It replaced in function the shell remnants of Winchester Palace on the South Bank, Southwark left by the Wars of the Three Kingdoms (English Civil War). In 1821, after the house fell into disrepair, the bishop gained an Act that allowed the sale of the house and its ground of 2.5 acres to the trustees of the Cadogan Estate. In 1825, the trustees obtained a further Act to demolish the property and build new houses on the site. Demolition was complete by 1836, but the site was still vacant in 1847. By 1850, there were ten houses at the northern end, and four at the southern by 1851. The area is now known as Oakley Street.
