= Clink Street =

Street in Bankside, London

Coordinates: 51.5070°N 0.0911°W

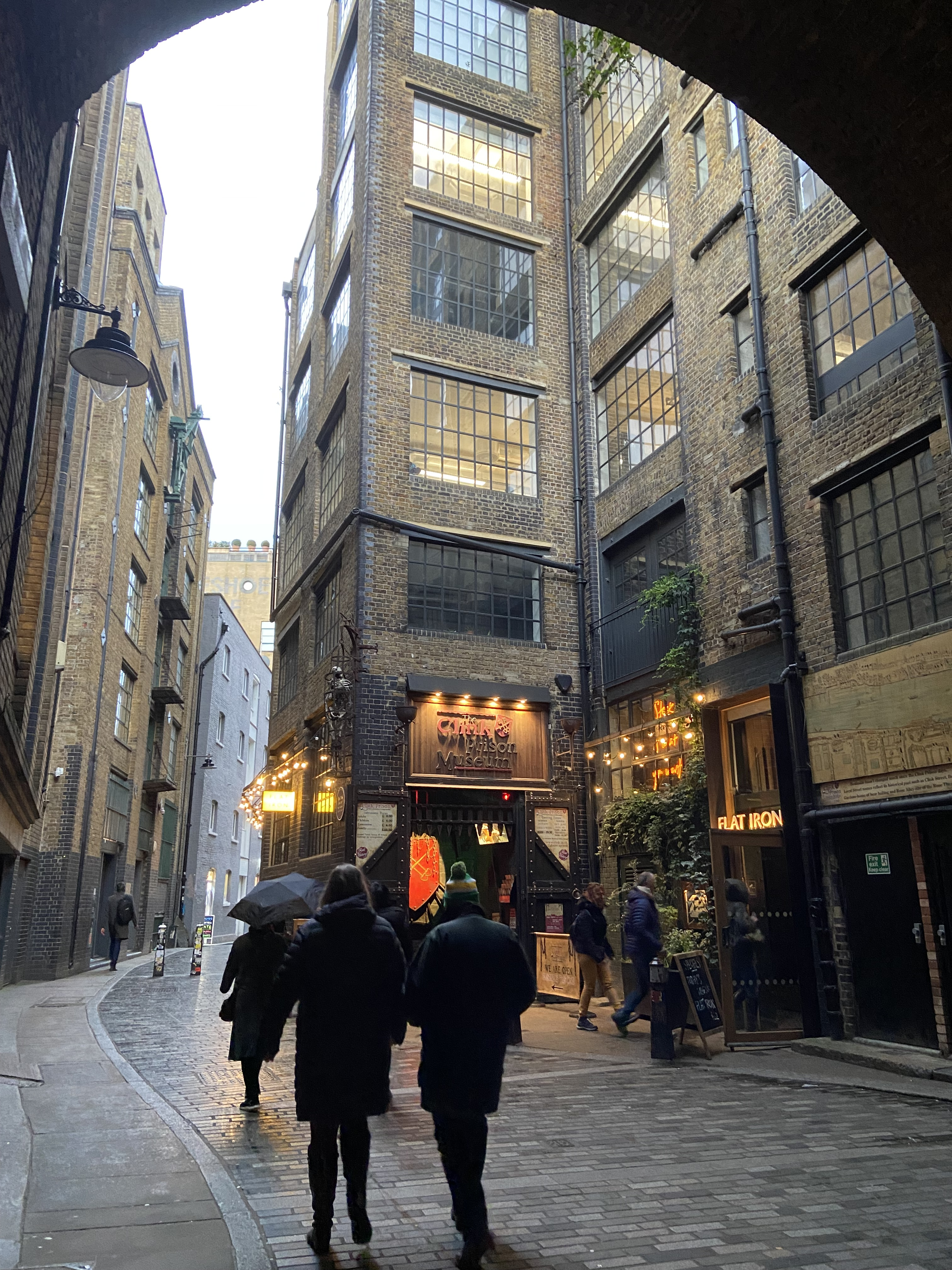
Entrance to The Clink prison museum

Clink Street is a street in Bankside, London, UK, between Southwark Cathedral and the Globe Theatre.

Narrow, dark and cobbled, it is best known as the historic location of the notorious Clink Prison, giving rise to the slang phrase 'in the clink', meaning 'in prison'. The prison was burned down in riots during 1780, and a small museum and tourist attraction now occupies part of the site. Clink Street is very close, and runs parallel, to the River Thames. A replica of the Golden Hind is moored in a small dock at the eastern end of the street.

A chase scene in the David Lean directed Oliver Twist was filmed there. The Doctor Who episode, "The Talons of Weng-Chiang", was filmed in this area, as was the final sequence in the 1981 John Landis film An American Werewolf in London. More recently, it was used as the exterior of Daniel Cleaver's flat in Bridget Jones's Diary.

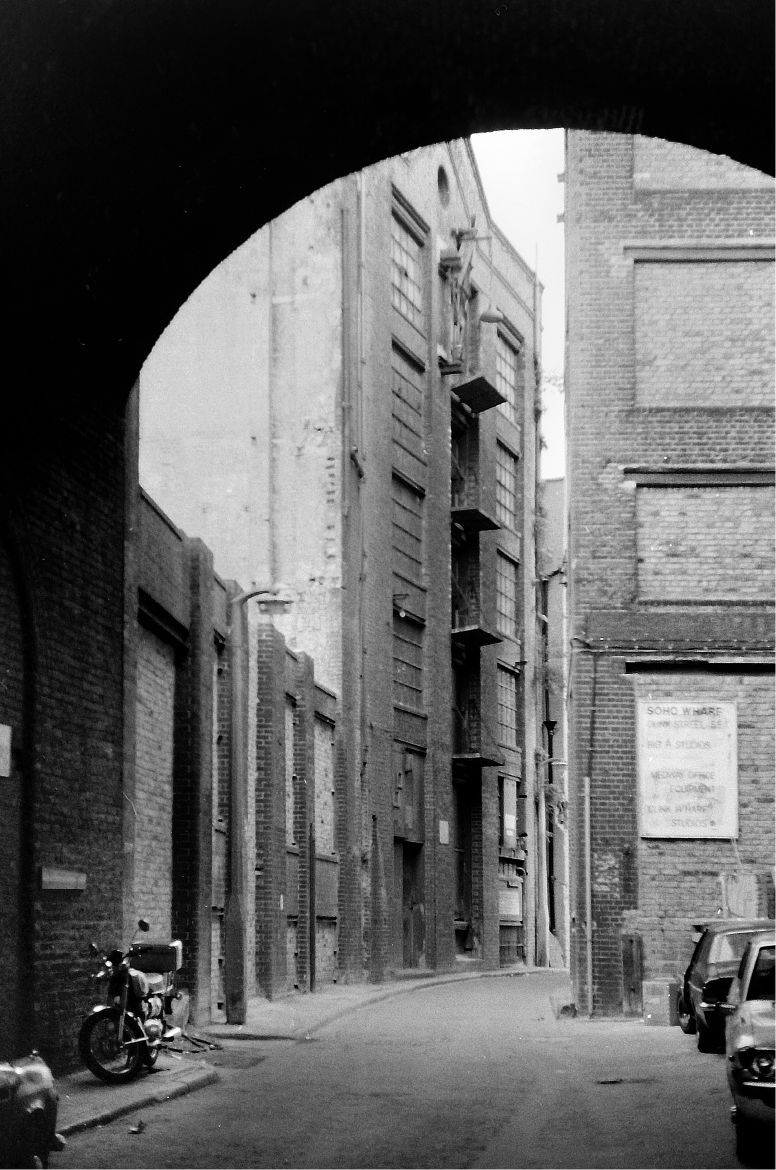
Clink Street in 1983

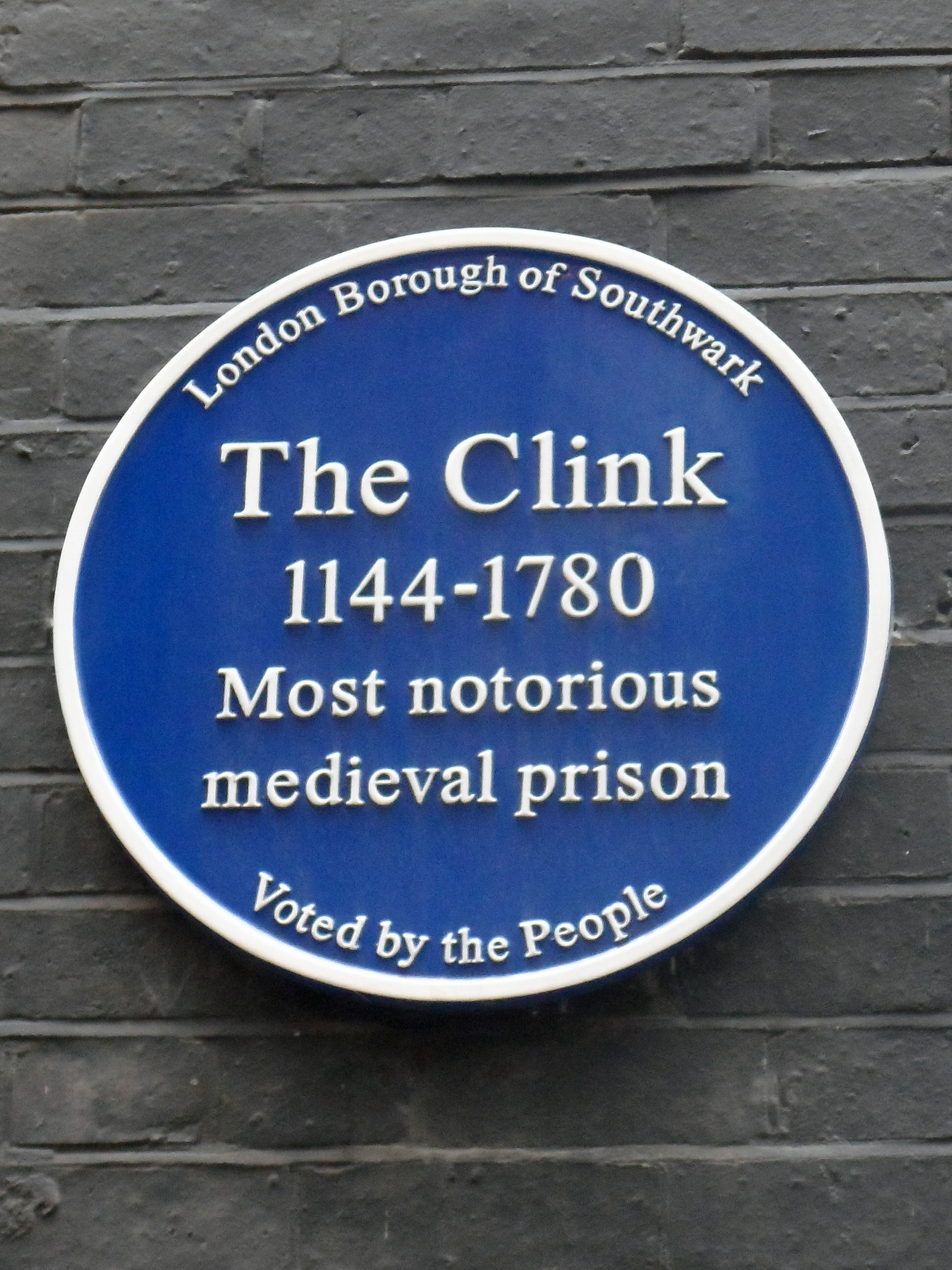
Blue plaque on the former prison site

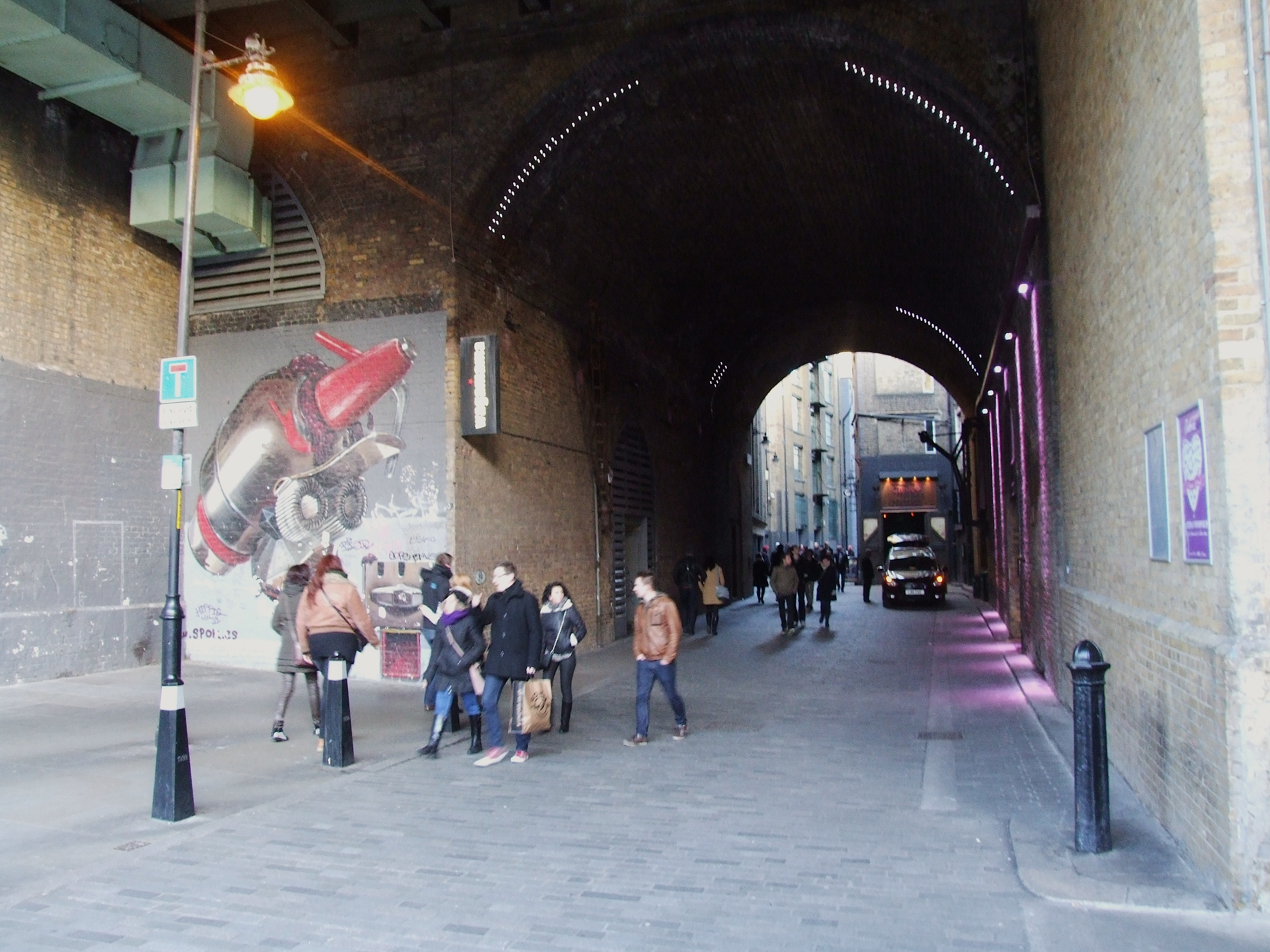
Clink Street under Cannon Street Railway Bridge
