= 1859 Ulster revival =

The 1859 Ulster revival was a Christian revival in Ulster which spread to the rest of the United Kingdom. It has been reported that the revival produced 100,000 converts.

The revival began in Kells and Connor in County Antrim. In late 1857, through the encouragement of the minister of Connor Presbyterian Church, John Hamilton Moore, four recent converts began meeting in the Kells National Schoolhouse for prayer and Bible study. 1 January 1858 saw the first person converted as a direct result of the prayer meeting, and by the end of 1858 the attendance was around fifty. By Spring 1859 there were 16 prayer meetings in the parish. The revival spread to Ahoghill in March 1859 and then to Ballymena.

Although the revival started with laymen, revival preachers such as Henry Grattan Guinness and Brownlow North soon got involved. On one occasion North preached to 12,000 people at Newtonlimavady. James Bain, pastor of the Congregational church at Straid, described a typical Sunday during the revival in the following terms:

Our Sabbath services are continuous, from nine in the morning until ten at night. We are engaged from nine to twelve in prayer meetings for the young, from twelve to two in public service, from two to four in prayer meetings, from five to eight in the evening service, and finally in our evening prayer meeting.

The revival was a largely Presbyterian phenomenon, but not all Presbyterians supported it. William Gibson, Moderator of the Presbyterian Church of Ireland in 1859, wrote a book about the revival called Year of Grace: A History of the Ulster Revival of 1859. However, another Presbyterian minister wrote a response called The Year of Delusion.

J. Edwin Orr suggested that the 1859 revival "made a greater impact spiritually on Ireland, than anything else known since the days of St. Patrick." According to Ian Paisley, the revival is the reason that Northern Ireland is much more religiously conservative than the rest of the UK or Europe.

== See also ==
- 1859 Welsh revival
