= The Phene =

Pub in Chelsea

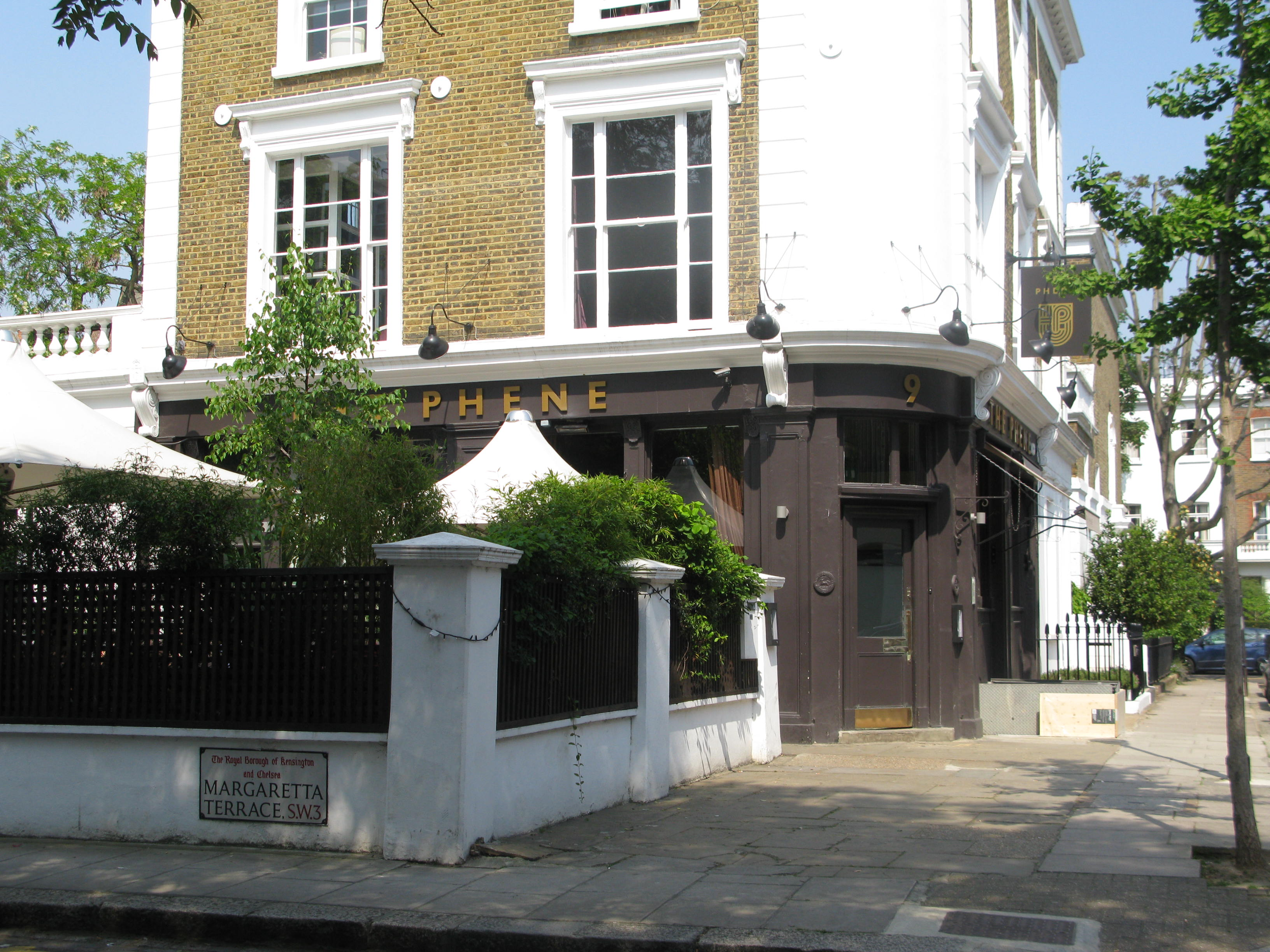
- The Phene Arms, 2012

- Location within Royal Borough of Kensington and Chelsea Location within Greater London

General information
- Location: 9 Phene Street, Chelsea, London, England
- Coordinates: 51.485251°N 0.167708°W

The Phene is a public house at 9 Phene Street, Chelsea, London SW3. It was designed by and named after the architect John Samuel Phene. The Daily Telegraph called it "George Best's second home".

It was owned by the property developer Robert Bourne, who in 2012 applied for planning permission to turn it into a £15 million house. In 2013, it was announced that the pub had been saved from closure. At the rumoured cost of £4 million, it represented the first London acquisition for new owners The City Pub Company.
