= 1859 Welsh revival =

Christian revival in South Wales

The 1859 Welsh revival was a Christian revival in South Wales. It was documented by three Welsh religious historians:

- Thomas Rees, the Congregational minister
- Thomas Lewis, the Baptist minister, and
- E. T. Davies, the Welsh schoolmaster and Anglican scholar-priest.

Davies documented that there were revivals in Merthyr Tydfil in 1810, 1815 and 1829, and sporadically in the Mynyddislwyn area over a period of thirty-five years. and that there were three revivals in 1831–1832.

Rees documented that there were further revivals in 1841, 1842, and 1843, which were followed by what he described as "The Great Revival" of 1849. He attributed the first three revivals to the circulation of a translation of "Mr. Finney's 'Lectures' by Mr. Griffiths. of Swansea". However, he later wrote the following qualification: "It will be readily acknowledged that the terrible visitation of the Cholera was principally the means of arousing the attention of our hearers to consider seriously the important truths with which they were already theoretically acquainted ...".

Finally Davies documented that the "most powerful" of the revivals occurred in 1849. This followed a cholera outbreak in Merthyr Tydfil and spread across north Monmouthshire. Lewis made the following informative observations:

1849 – This year has been remarkable for cholera epidemic [sic] in England and Wales. Thousands have died from the disease, which caused a panic among the people – the mere hearers of the Word. Many hundreds fled to the churches for membership, especially on the hills and in the ironworks. It is feared that terror only has driven many, and not the constraining love of Christ.

Humphrey Jones, a Methodist minister, and David Morgan, a Presbyterian minister, led the 1859 revival. It had its roots in the Third Great Awakening (1857–1859) in the United States, which Jones had experienced in New York City. On his return to Tre'r Ddôl, he recruited Morgan to the cause.

Davies observed, citing Thomas Rees in Phillips, that the revival "had less effect in Monmouthshire than in Glamorgan; and only rarely did the Baptists and the Established Church join with the Independents, Wesleyan Methodists and Calvinistic Methodists".

Two claims have been made about the effect of the revival. Davies claimed that "it added 80,000 to the membership of the chapels". In contrast, Jones estimated that it produced 100,000 converts.

Martyn Lloyd-Jones viewed the revival as being connected to the revival in Ulster during the same year. Rees was more informative. He initially documented, in a letter to H.O. Wills, an English colleague and one of four benefactors, that he and four colleagues travelled from Holyhead to Dublin and then to Belfast, where they attended two prayer-meetings and visited '"every part of the town" and gathered "all the information we could from ministers [and] town missionaries". He subsequently documented, in two follow-up letters to Wills, detailed enthusiastic accounts of the revival.

The next major revival after 1859 was the 1904–1905 Welsh revival.
