= Winchester Palace =

Twelfth-century palace in London

Winchester Hall
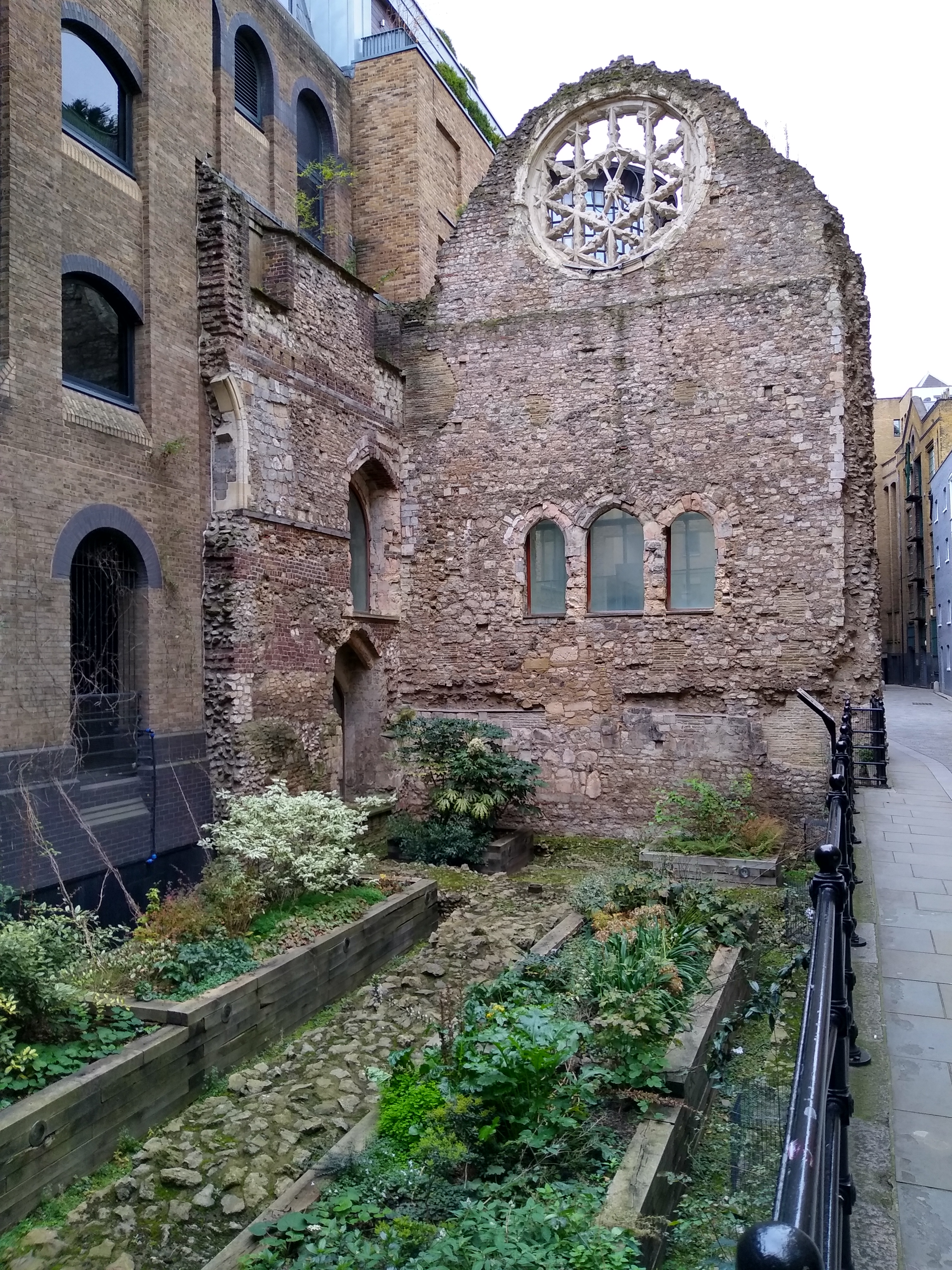
- Remains of the great hall of Winchester Palace showing the Rose Window and underneath the traditional arrangement of three doors from the screens passage to the buttery, pantry and kitchen.

- Location within Central London
- 51°30′25″N 0°05′28″W
- Location: Clink Street; London, SE1; United Kingdom

History
- Built: 12th century

Site notes
- Architectural styles: Medieval; Tudor
- Governing body: English Heritage

Scheduled monument
- Reference no.: Grade II

Winchester Palace was a 12th-century bishop's palace that served as the London townhouse of the Bishops of Winchester. It was located in the parish of Southwark in Surrey, on the south bank of the River Thames (opposite the City of London) on what is now Clink Street in the London Borough of Southwark, near Southwark Priory (which later became Southwark Cathedral). Grade II listed remains of the demolished palace survive on the site today, designated a Scheduled Ancient Monument, under the care of English Heritage.

== History ==
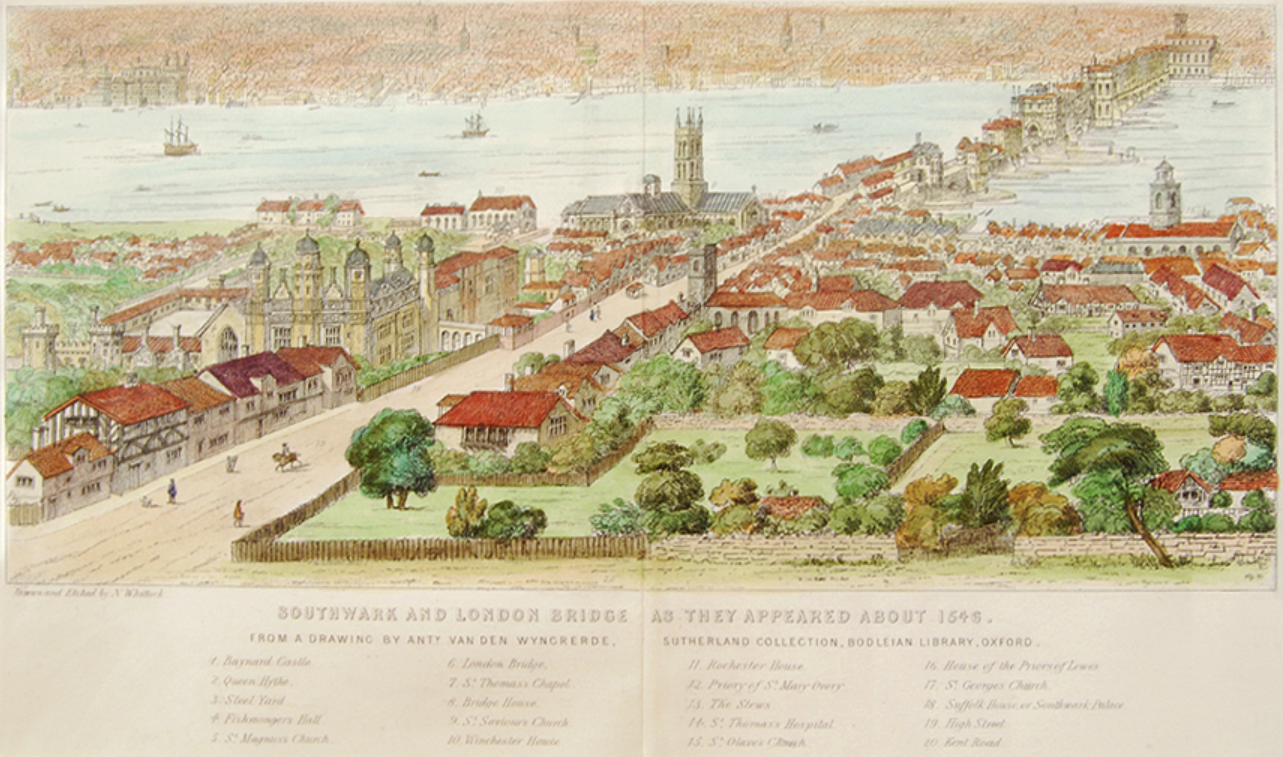
Southwark, bird's eye panorama looking north-west, 19th century engraving after an original drawing dated 1546 by Anton van den Wyngaerde (1525–1571). The large mansion house on the west side of Southwark High Street is Suffolk House, beyond which, by the river and to the west (left) of St Saviour's Church, is Winchester House

Southwark in the county of Surrey was formerly the largest manor in the Diocese of Winchester and the Bishop of Winchester was a major landowner in the area. He was a great power in the land, and traditionally served as the king's royal treasurer, performing the function of the modern Chancellor of the Exchequer. He thus frequently needed to attend the king both at his court in Westminster, at the Tower of London and also was required to attend Parliament with other bishops and major abbots. The city of Winchester had been the capital of the Saxon kings of England. For that purpose, Henry of Blois built the palace as his comfortable and high-status London residence. Most of the other English bishops similarly had episcopal palaces in London, most notably Lambeth Palace, residence of the Archbishop of Canterbury.

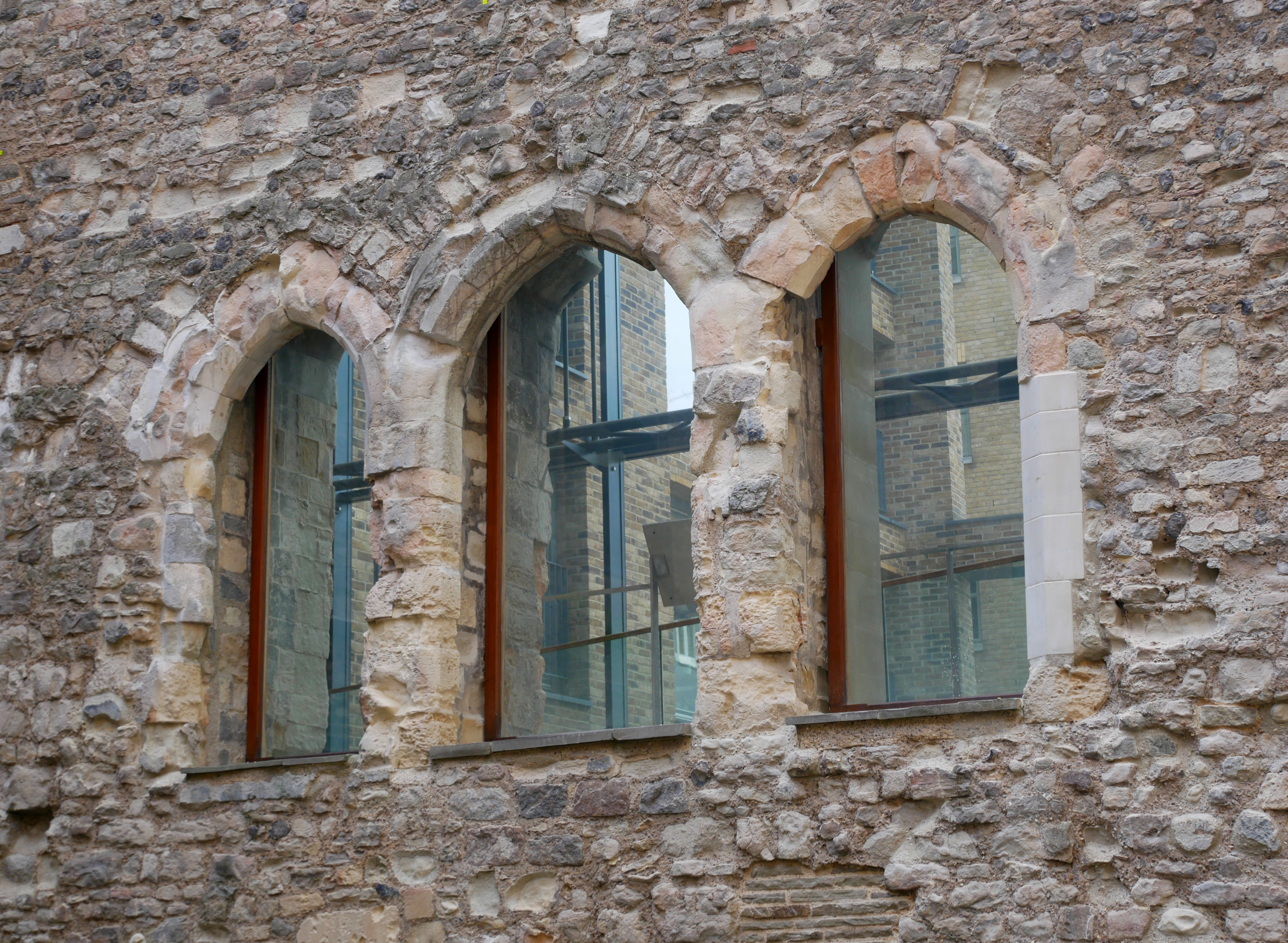
Doors formerly to the kitchens in the surviving west wall

From 1682 to 1686 the palace was remodelled adding Corinthian columns and pilasters, to give a more contemporary Renaissance look the sculpture and masonry being by Edward Strong the Elder.

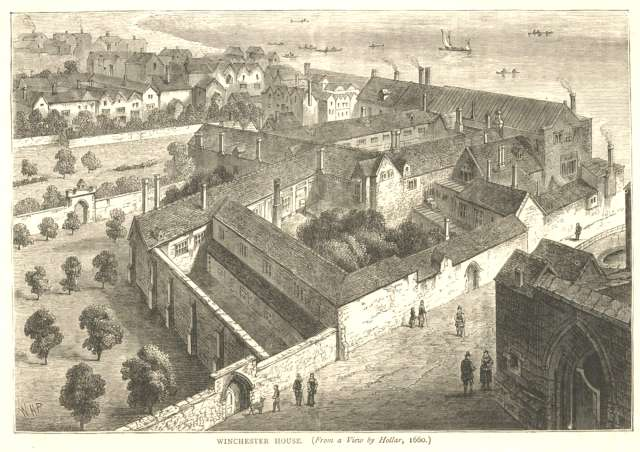
Winchester Palace, 1660 drawing by Wenceslas Hollar

The palace remained in use until around 1700, when it was converted and divided into tenements and warehouses. These were mostly destroyed by fire in 1814. Part of the great hall, and the west gable end with its rose window became more visible after a 19th-century fire and 20th-century redevelopment. It is believed that the great hall was built in about 1136.

The hall was enlarged and the rose window built in the 14th century, possibly by Bishop William of Wykeham (reigned 1367–1398).

Below the hall was a richly decorated vaulted cellar with direct access to a wharf on the River Thames for bringing in supplies. Royal visitors were entertained at the palace, including King James I of Scotland on his wedding to Joan Beaufort (niece of the then bishop, Cardinal Henry Beaufort) in 1424. The palace was arranged around two courtyards. Other buildings within the site included a prison, a brewery and a butchery. The palace environs comprised a garden, a tennis court and a bowling alley.

During the Civil War Sir Thomas Ogle was imprisoned here, during which time he tried to draw Thomas Devenish, a member of John Goodwin's Independent Congregation, into a royalist plot to split the Parliamentarian Independents from the Presbyterians in order to assist Charles I's numbers in Parliament.

== The Clink Liberty ==
Associated with the palace was the Liberty of the Clink which also lay on the south bank of the River Thames, an area free from the jurisdiction of the City of London. It therefore became an area where activities which were suppressed in the City could flourish openly. Thus gaming houses, bowling alleys, theatres and brothels abounded. It took its name from the notorious Clink prison which lay within the Liberty and gave rise to the slang expression "in the clink" (i.e. in prison). The Bishops of Winchester received rents from the numerous brothels, leading to the local prostitutes being known as "Winchester geese".

== Present day ==
The remains of Winchester Palace are listed as a Scheduled Monument and are managed by English Heritage.
