= John Samuel Phene =

Phene in the garden of his "Gingerbread Castle"

John Samuel Phene FRGS, FSA, FRIBA (1822 – 11 March 1912) was a British architect, who lived in Chelsea, London, for more than 50 years.

== Biography ==
He was born the son of William Phene, a London businessman and educated at King's Lynn Grammar School, Durham University and Trinity College, Cambridge. He was then articled to architect R. A. Hardwick.

Phene married Margaretta Forsyth (1827–1901) in 1847, but before long she moved to live in France. An apocryphal story reports that his wife died on her wedding day, leading to Phene preserving the room in the mansion where the reception had been held. He subsequently inherited land in Chelsea, and built Margaretta Terrace and Phene Street, including the Phene Arms.

Phene designed the new wing of the Royal Free Hospital in Gray's Inn Road in the late 1850s. He was granted fellowship of the Royal Institute of British Architects in 1872, and was a founder Fellow of the Huguenot Society in 1886.

In 1903, he constructed a five-storey house at No. 2 Upper Cheyne Row, Chelsea, adorning it with a variety of fixtures and ornaments, which led to it being called "Gingerbread Castle". He became well known in the local area as an eccentric, which led to some people thinking he was involved in the "black arts". He spent little time in London, preferring to travel the world collecting various interesting artefacts and artwork, and filled the mansion's gardens with numerous statues and ornaments.

Phene died in 1912 aged 90, and the mansion was demolished in 1924, having never been completed. The site of this is now 4–14 (inclusive) Upper Cheyne Row and 47–51 Glebe Place. His name is still commemorated in The Phene, the local Chelsea pub he designed that was built in 1850, which sports a picture of the Gingerbread Mansion.

== Bibliography and sources ==
- Directory of British Architects, 1834–1914: Vol. 2 (L-Z). A&C Black. 2001. ISBN 978-0-826-45514-7.
- Glinert, Ed (2003). The London compendium: exploring the hidden metropolis. Allen Lane.
- Weinreb, Ben; Hibbert, Christopher; Keay, John; Keay, Julia (2008). The London Encyclopaedia (2nd ed.). Pan Macmillan. ISBN 978-1-405-04924-5.
