= Clifford's Fort =

Historic gun battery in Tyne and Wear, England

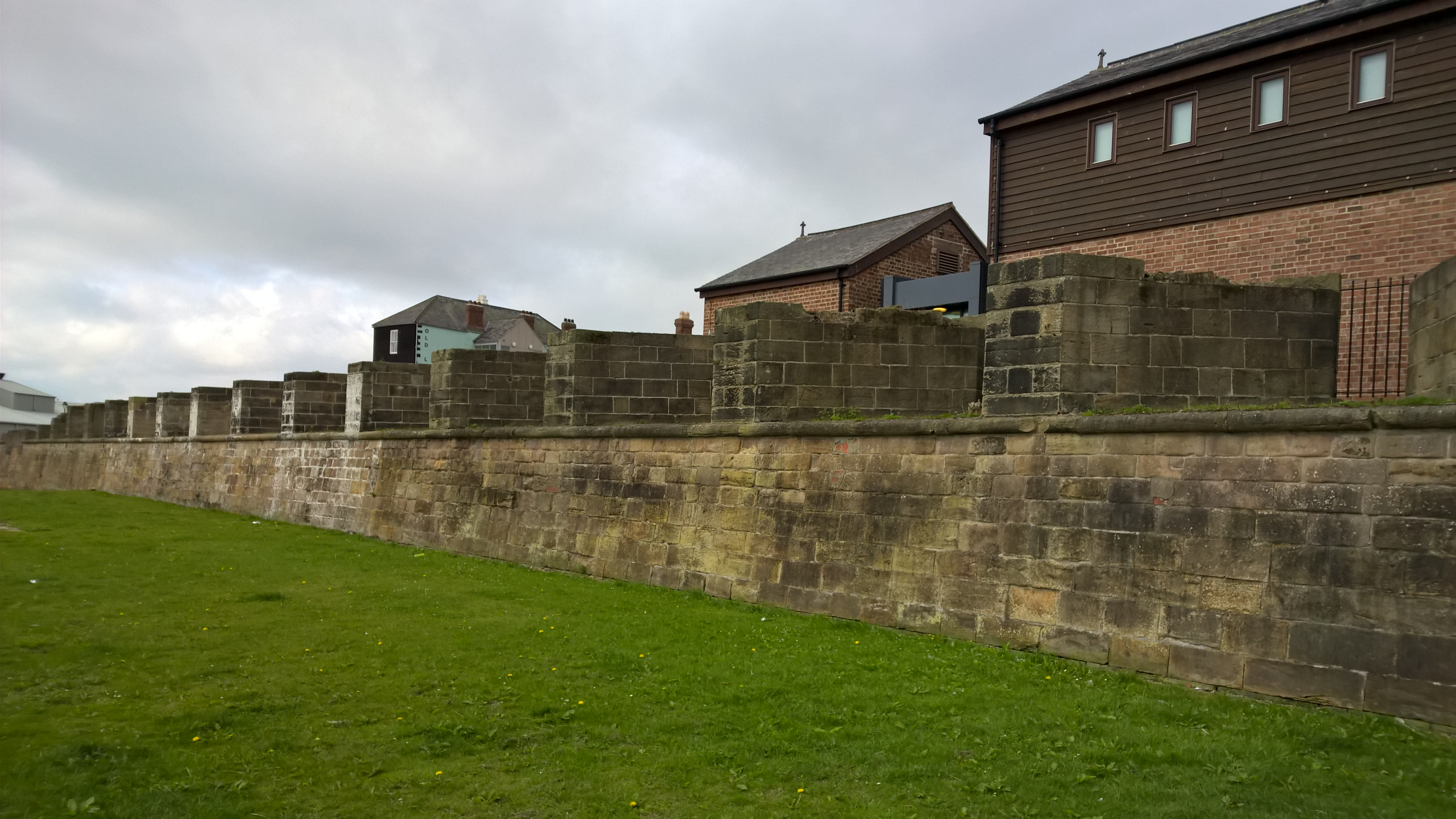
- Gun embrasures on the east wall of the fort

- Location within Tyne and Wear
- 55.0098°N 1.4335°W
- Location: Fish Quay, North Shields, Tyne and Wear, England

History
- Built: 1672

Listed Building – Grade II*
- Official name: Clifford's Fort west and south west wall
- Designated: 19 February 1986
- Reference no.: 1025359

Scheduled monument
- Official name: Clifford's Fort
- Reference no.: 1005896

Clifford's Fort was a defensive gun battery established near the mouth of the Tyne during the Anglo-Dutch Wars in the 17th century. It subsequently served as a submarine mining depot and survives today as a scheduled monument in the historic Fish Quay area of North Shields, Tyne and Wear, in North East England.

== History ==
=== 17th century ===
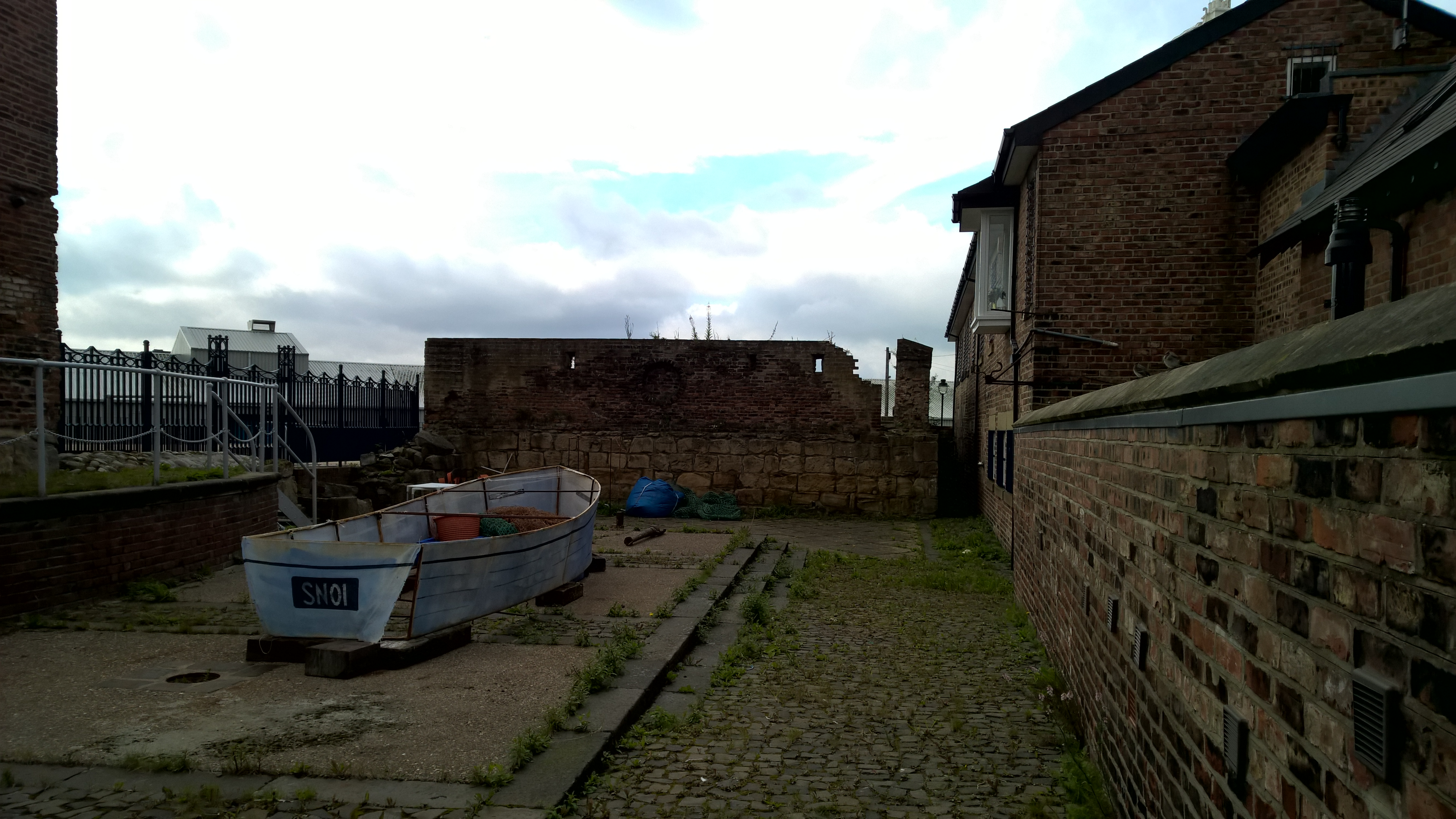
17th-century west wall with musket ports. A postern to the left originally provided access to the lighthouse.

The fort was built in 1672 at the start of the Third Dutch War. An earlier fort had been established on or near the site some thirty years earlier (a somewhat temporary structure consisting of gabions: "baskets filled with sand and mortar, with guns placed between the baskets") but this had been destroyed in action in 1644. (It was paired with a similar fort on the south bank of the river, which had been established by the Marquis of Newcastle in 1642.)

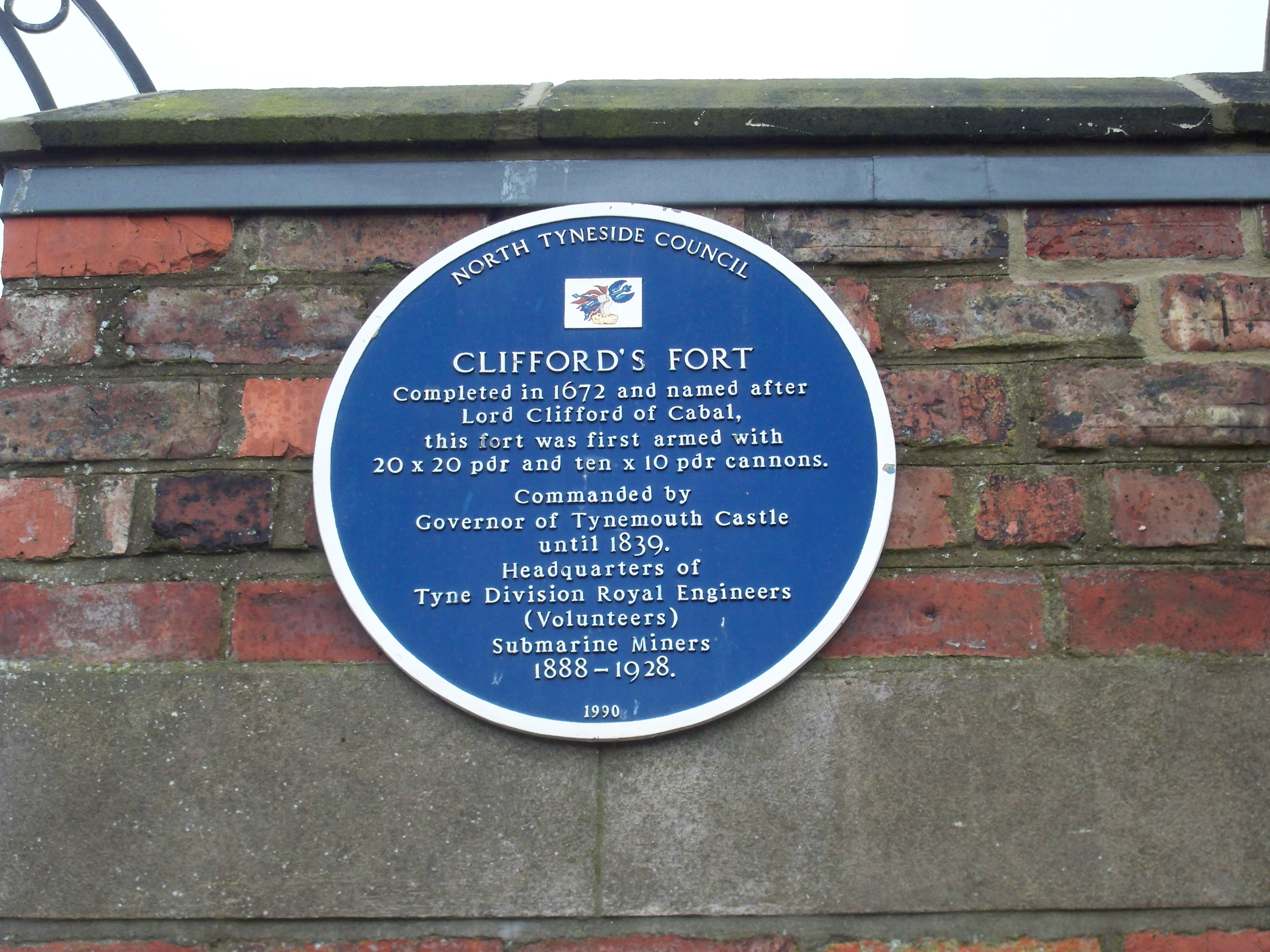
Modern plaque

Named after Lord Clifford of Chudleigh ('Clifford of the Cabal'), the new fort was built to the designs of Anglo-Swedish engineer Martin Beckman. It consisted of a raised platform, walled and with a three storey redoubt, protecting a low riverside gun battery, defended to landward by a bastioned trace. It was initially armed with thirty cannons: twenty 20-pounders and ten 10-pounders.

Clifford's Fort was, from its beginnings, associated with the long-established nearby defences of Tynemouth Castle, and the Governor of Tynemouth had oversight of the Fort through until 1839. By the time the fort was built, however, the castle had fallen into a ruinous state and the fort therefore took over as the main defender of the river.

The building of the fort interfered with a lighthouse which had been established on the site by Trinity House of Newcastle-upon-Tyne in 1539, and this remained a point of contention in subsequent decades (not least because the force of the guns, when fired, damaged the lantern).

=== 18th century ===
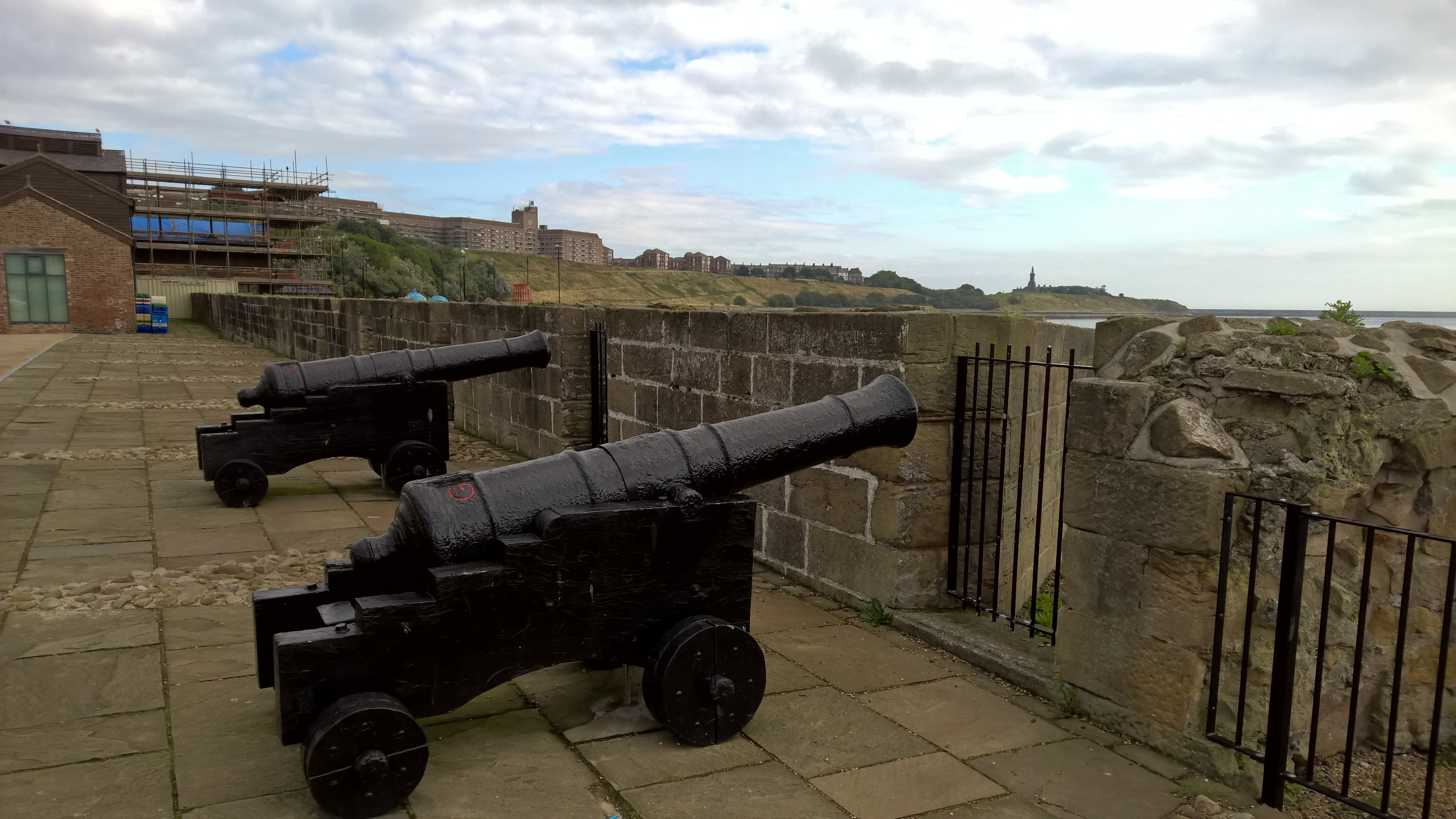
Guns on the fort, looking towards Tynemouth

In the 18th century there was much reconstruction, and the current seaward walls of sandstone ashlar date from that time. By 1720 the redoubt had been reconstructed to serve as a barracks for a company of Invalids (military veterans who helped man the guns), with a gunpowder magazine in the basement (as shown on a map of 1720 now in the British Library). The fort continued to be well-maintained; however the building of a new Governor's House in 1726 obscured the old Low Light, which had to be rebuilt the following year. In 1748 the fort reportedly had "thirty-six 18-pounder guns in three batteries, and a large store of powder within the tower".

=== 19th century ===
The fort continued in use as a gun battery until the second half of the 19th century, when the building of the Tynemouth piers effectively rendered it obsolete. It was vacated in 1881, but in 1888 the fort became the headquarters of the newly-established Tyne Division Royal Engineers (Volunteers) Submarine Miners The division was one of a number of units around the country responsible for laying and maintaining fixed electro-mechanical mines as port defences. The mines were fired remotely by way of submarine cables, stored in three large tanks alongside the eastern wall of the fort. Several new buildings were established on the site at this time and the old tower or 'keep' was demolished in 1893. At the turn of the century a pair of 6-pounder quick firing guns were installed on the site to defend the minefield.

=== 20th century ===
In 1907 responsibility for mines having been transferred from the Royal Engineers to the Royal Navy, defensive submarine mining of ports was discontinued (though it was subsequently reinstated, here and elsewhere, for the duration of the First World War). The volunteers at Clifford's Fort were redesignated Tyne Electrical Engineers and given the responsibility of maintaining searchlights for coastal defence. The Electrical Engineers moved out of the fort in 1928, whereupon the site ceased to be a military installation and was acquired by the local authority. It was then given over to serve as a fish processing plant. Several buildings from the submarine mining era were converted at this time; the mine stores and a barrack block became smokehouses.

The fort continued to function as an extension to the Fish Quay through the century, though as time went on its surviving fabric suffered, parts of the fortifications being demolished as buildings were added or extended. The Master Gunner's house at the south-west corner of the site, dating from the mid-18th century, was demolished in 1973 to make way for a fish processing unit.

== Present day ==
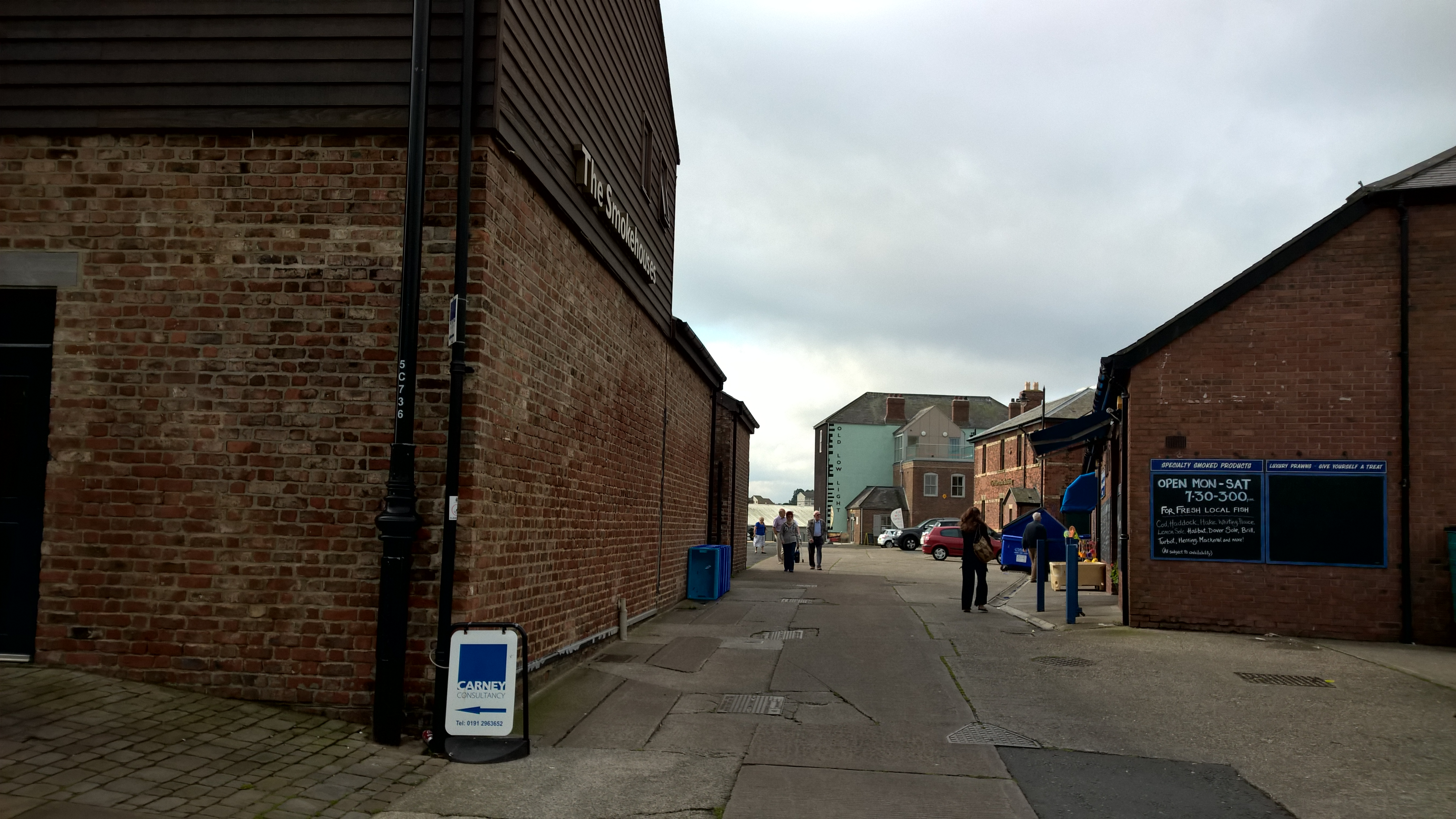
Buildings on the fort today (left-right): Smokehouses (formerly mine stores), Old Low Light, 'The Barracks' (c. 1893) and fishmongers' stalls.

Starting in 2008 the remains of the fort were comprehensively restored: a number of modern buildings were removed and the moat was reinstated. In 2013 the fort was removed from the Heritage at Risk Register; this followed a £1 million refurbishment scheme, funded by North Tyneside Council and the Heritage Lottery Fund, which completed the restoration of the fort and brought unused buildings back into use (including the Old Low Light, which opened to the public in 2015 as a museum telling the history of the site).

== See also ==
- Grade II* listed buildings in Tyne and Wear
