= North Tyneside =

Metropolitan Borough of North Tyneside
- Metropolitan borough
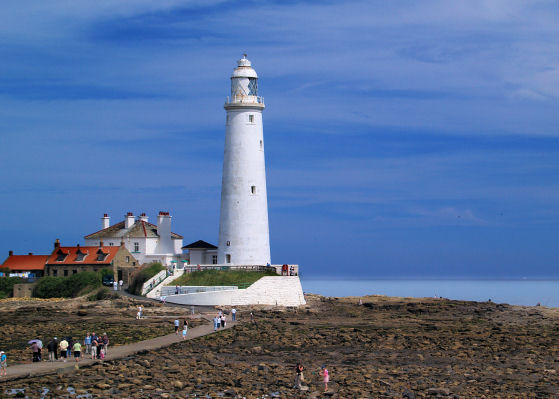
- St Mary's Lighthouse, Whitley Bay

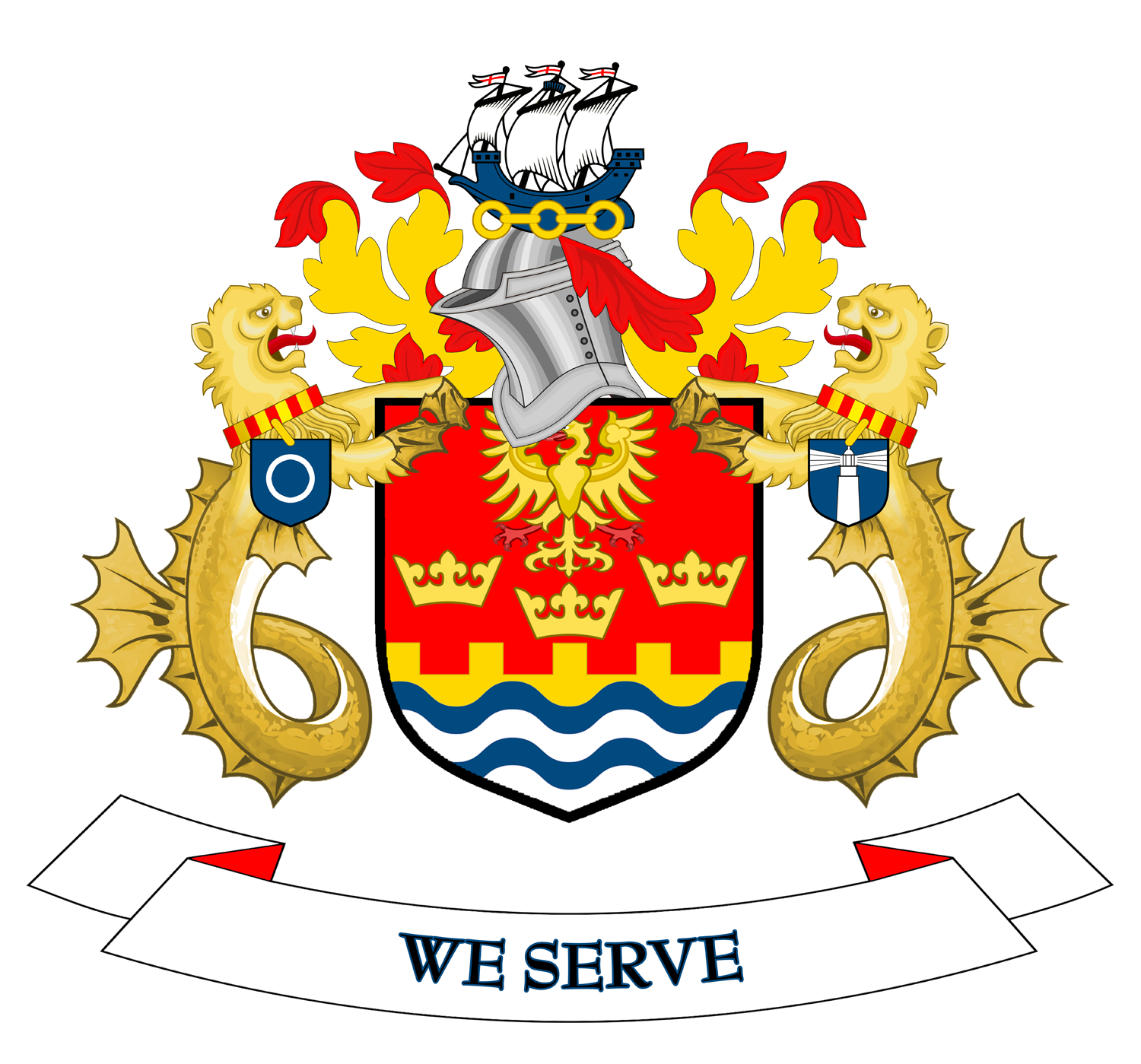
- Coat of arms
- Motto: We Serve
- North Tyneside shown within Tyne and Wear
- Coordinates: 55.0123°N 1.5456°W
- Sovereign state: United Kingdom
- Country: England
- Region: North East
- Ceremonial county: Tyne and Wear
- City region: North East
- Incorporated: 1 April 1974
- Named for: River Tyne
- Administrative HQ: Wallsend

Government
  - Type: Metropolitan borough
  - Body: North Tyneside Council
  - Executive: Mayor and cabinet
  - Control: Labour
  - Mayor: Karen Clark (L)
  - Chair: Nigel Huscroft
  - MPs: 4 MPs: Alan Campbell (L); Emma Foody (L); Mary Glindon (L); Catherine McKinnell (L)

Area
  - Total: 32 sq mi (82 km^{2})
  - Rank: 212th

Population (2025)
  - Total: 215,401
  - Rank: 92nd
  - Density: 6,780/sq mi (2,617/km^{2})

Ethnicity (2021)
  - Ethnic groups: List: 94.9% White; 2.6% Asian; 1.4% Mixed; 0.6% Black; 0.6% other

Religion (2021)
  - Religion: List: 46.6% Christianity; 46.1% no religion; 1.2% Islam; 0.4% Hinduism; 0.3% Buddhism; 0.2% Sikhism; 0.1% Judaism; 0.4% other; 4.8% not stated
- Time zone: UTC+0 (GMT)
  - Summer (DST): UTC+1 (BST)
- Postcode areas: NE
- Dialling codes: 0191
- ISO 3166 code: GB-NTY
- GSS code: E08000022
- Website: northtyneside.gov.uk

North Tyneside is a metropolitan borough in the metropolitan county of Tyne and Wear, England. It forms part of the greater Tyneside conurbation. North Tyneside Council is headquartered at Cobalt Park, Wallsend.

North Tyneside is bordered by Newcastle upon Tyne to the west, the North Sea to the east, the River Tyne to the south and Northumberland to the north. Within its bounds are the towns of Wallsend, North Shields, Killingworth, Tynemouth and Whitley Bay, which form a continuously built-up area contiguous with Newcastle upon Tyne.

== History ==
The borough was formed on 1 April 1974 by the merger of the county borough of Tynemouth, with the borough of Wallsend, part of the borough of Whitley Bay, the urban district of Longbenton and part of the urban district of Seaton Valley, all of which were in Northumberland. Killingworth was built as a new town in the 1960s and became part of North Tyneside.

== Geography ==
The following places are located in North Tyneside:

- Annitsford
- Backworth
- Battle Hill
- Benton
- Burradon
- Camperdown
- Cullercoats
- Dudley
- Earsdon
- Forest Hall
- Holystone
- Howdon
- Killingworth
- Longbenton
- Meadow Well
- Monkseaton
- Moorside
- Murton
- New York
- North Shields
- Northumberland Park
- Palmersville
- Percy Main
- Preston
- Seaton Burn
- Shiremoor
- Tynemouth
- Wallsend
- Wellfield
- West Allotment
- West Moor
- Whitley Bay
- Willington Quay

North Tyneside is split by the A19: the west of the borough is more urban, and is mostly contiguous with the city of Newcastle. The towns in the east of the borough are more separate from the central part of the Newcastle urban area. Many of the most affluent neighbourhoods in Tyne and Wear are found in the coastal part of the borough.

== Governance ==
Unlike most English districts, North Tyneside Council is led by a directly elected mayor; since May 2025, this post has been held by Karen Clark of the Labour Party.

The council has sixty elected members, three from each of the twenty wards in the borough. Elections are staggered into thirds, with one councillor from each ward elected each year for three consecutive years, and the mayoral election held on the fourth year.

North Tyneside is part of the North East Mayoral Combined Authority, which is chaired by the directly elected Mayor of the North East; there are therefore two directly elected mayors covering North Tyneside. The combined authority was established in 2024 covering North Tyneside, County Durham, Gateshead, Newcastle upon Tyne, Northumberland, South Tyneside and Sunderland.

== Economy ==
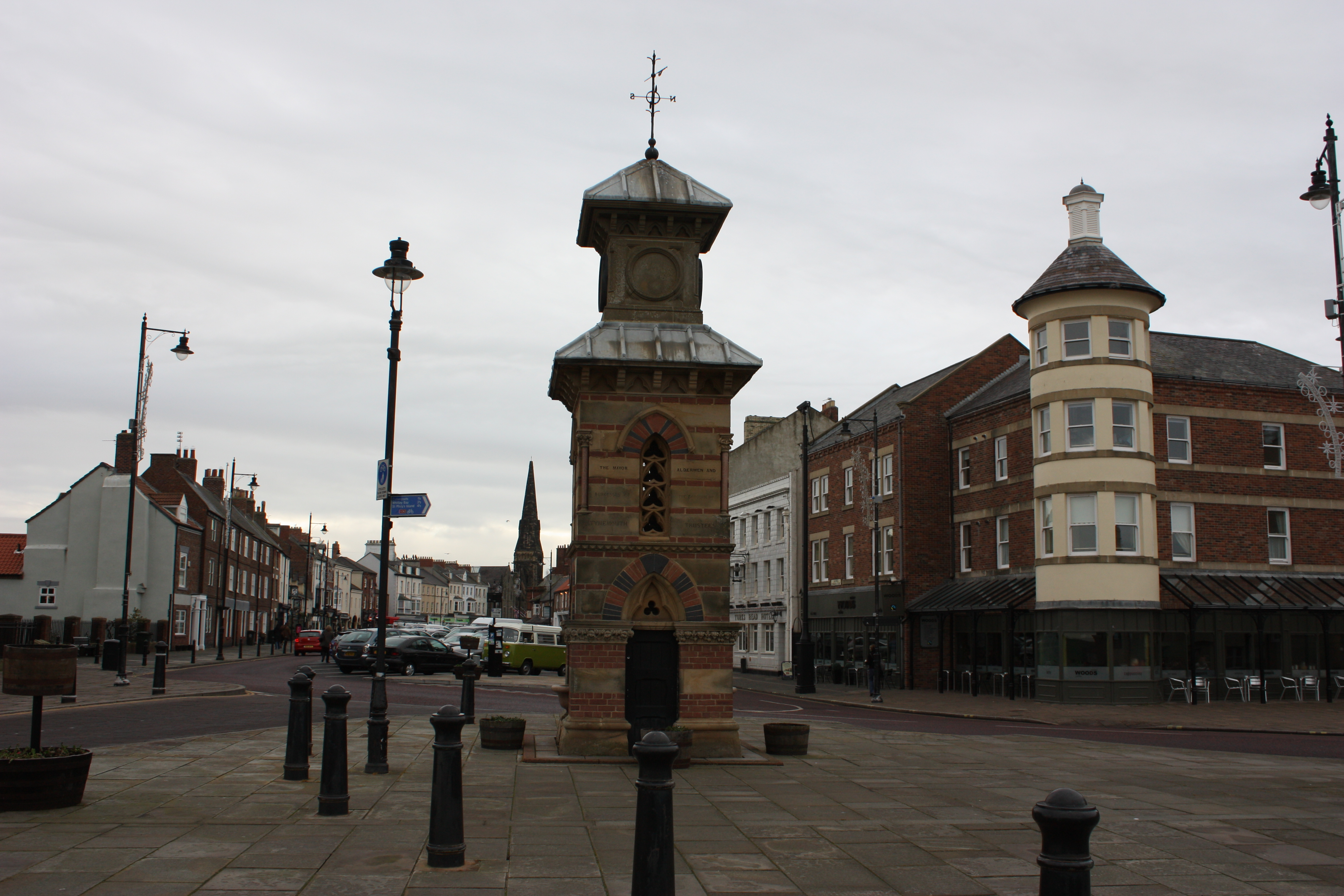
Tynemouth, one of the towns of the borough

North Tyneside lies in the coalfield that covers the South-East of the historic county of Northumberland. It has traditionally been a centre of heavy industry along with the rest of Tyneside, with for example the Swan Hunter shipyard in Wallsend, and export of coal. Today most of the heavy industry has gone, leaving high unemployment in some areas (over the borough, 5.1% compared to 3.7% for the UK in 2022).

== Transport ==
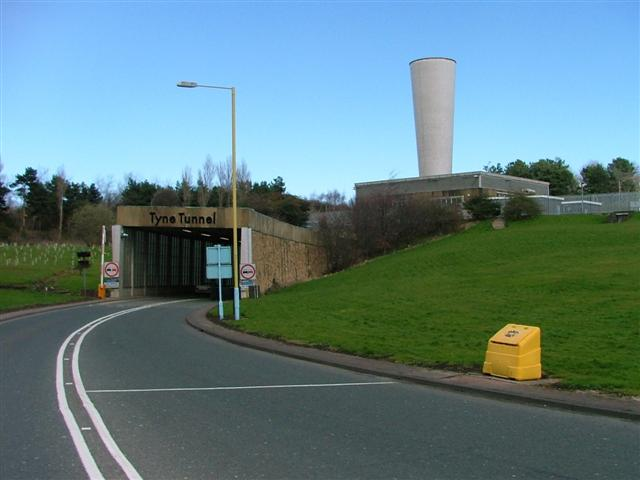
Tyne Tunnel Southern Entrance

Two key roads serve North Tyneside:

- The A19 which leaves the A1 north of Newcastle and runs through the borough and then through the Tyne Tunnel to South Tyneside, Teesside and towards the South.
- The Coast Road (A1058) runs from Newcastle to the coast. For most of its length it is grade-separated.

North Tyneside is served by 17 stations on the Tyne and Wear Metro on a loop from Newcastle through Wallsend, North Shields, Whitley Bay, Benton and back to Newcastle. Trains operate at least every 15 minutes, with extra services in the peak hours. Most of the stations serving North Tyneside fall into fare zones B and C.

There are no National Rail stations in the borough, despite the East Coast Main Line and Blyth and Tyne routes passing through. The nearest National Rail stations are Cramlington, Manors and Newcastle, which is also served by the Tyne & Wear Metro. Northumberland Park will open in 2026 to provide the borough's first heavy rail link since the 1970s.

North Tyneside has an extensive bus network, with most areas benefiting from direct services to Newcastle. Many areas have direct bus services to Cramlington, Blyth or Morpeth. The principle bus operators in the area are Arriva North East (all areas), Go North East (most areas) and Stagecoach in Newcastle (Benton, Forest Hall, Killingworth and Wallsend).

The Shields Ferry links North Shields to South Shields, in South Tyneside.

There is an international ferry terminal at Royal Quays in North Shields, with a service to Amsterdam (IJmuiden).

== Places of interest ==
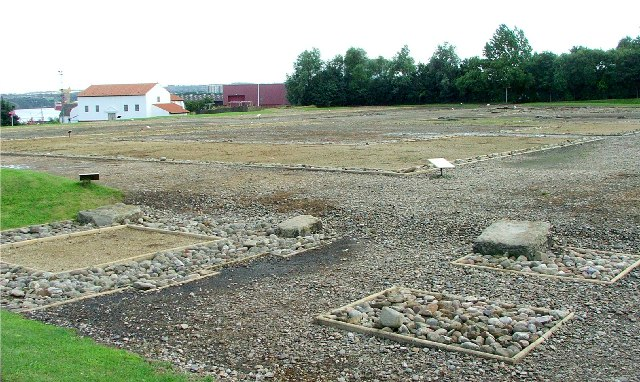
Segudunum Roman fort

- Segedunum Roman fort is in Wallsend (at the end of Hadrian's Wall).
- The Stephenson Railway Museum in New York, named after George Stephenson and Robert Stephenson who hailed from Tyneside and lived in West Moor in North Tyneside 1802–1824.
- Tynemouth Castle and Priory
- North Tyneside includes coastline covering Tynemouth, Cullercoats and Whitley Bay
- St. Mary's Island in Whitley Bay
- North Shields Fish Quay, Clifford's Fort and the High and Low Lights of North Shields

== Media ==
Local news and television programmes are provided by BBC North East and Cumbria and ITV Tyne Tees. Television signals are received from the Pontop Pike TV transmitter

Radio stations that broadcast to the area are BBC Radio Newcastle, Heart North East, Capital North East, Smooth Radio North East, Greatest Hits Radio North East, and Hits Radio North East.

The local newspaper is the Evening Chronicle.

== Twinned towns ==
North Tyneside is twinned with:

- Oer-Erkenschwick in Germany
- Halluin in France

== Freedom of the Borough ==
The following people and military units have received the Freedom of the Borough of North Tyneside.

=== Individuals ===
- Gordon Matthew Thomas Sumner, better known as Sting : 9 November 2023
- Dame Norma Redfearn: 9 February 2026.

==== Military Units ====
- 216 squadron (Tyne/Tees) Squadron Royal Corps of Transport (Volunteers) now 216 Tynemouth Squadron RLC. 23 February 1972.
- Royal British Legion (Whitley Bay and Forest Hall Branches): 15 October 2009.
- 2344 (Longbenton) Squadron Air Training Corps: 16 December 2014.
