= North Shields Fish Quay =

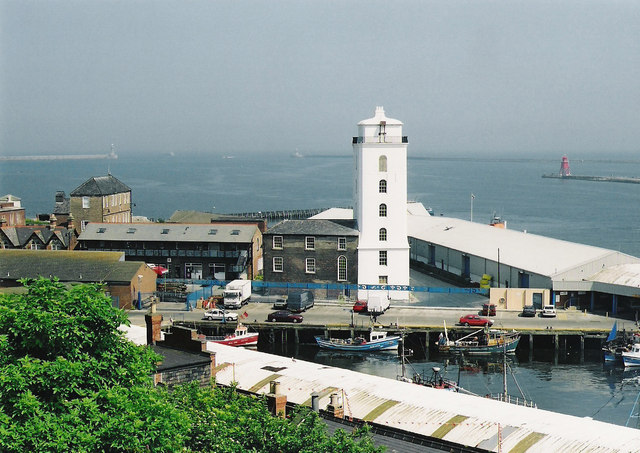
- Interactive map of North Shields Fish Quay
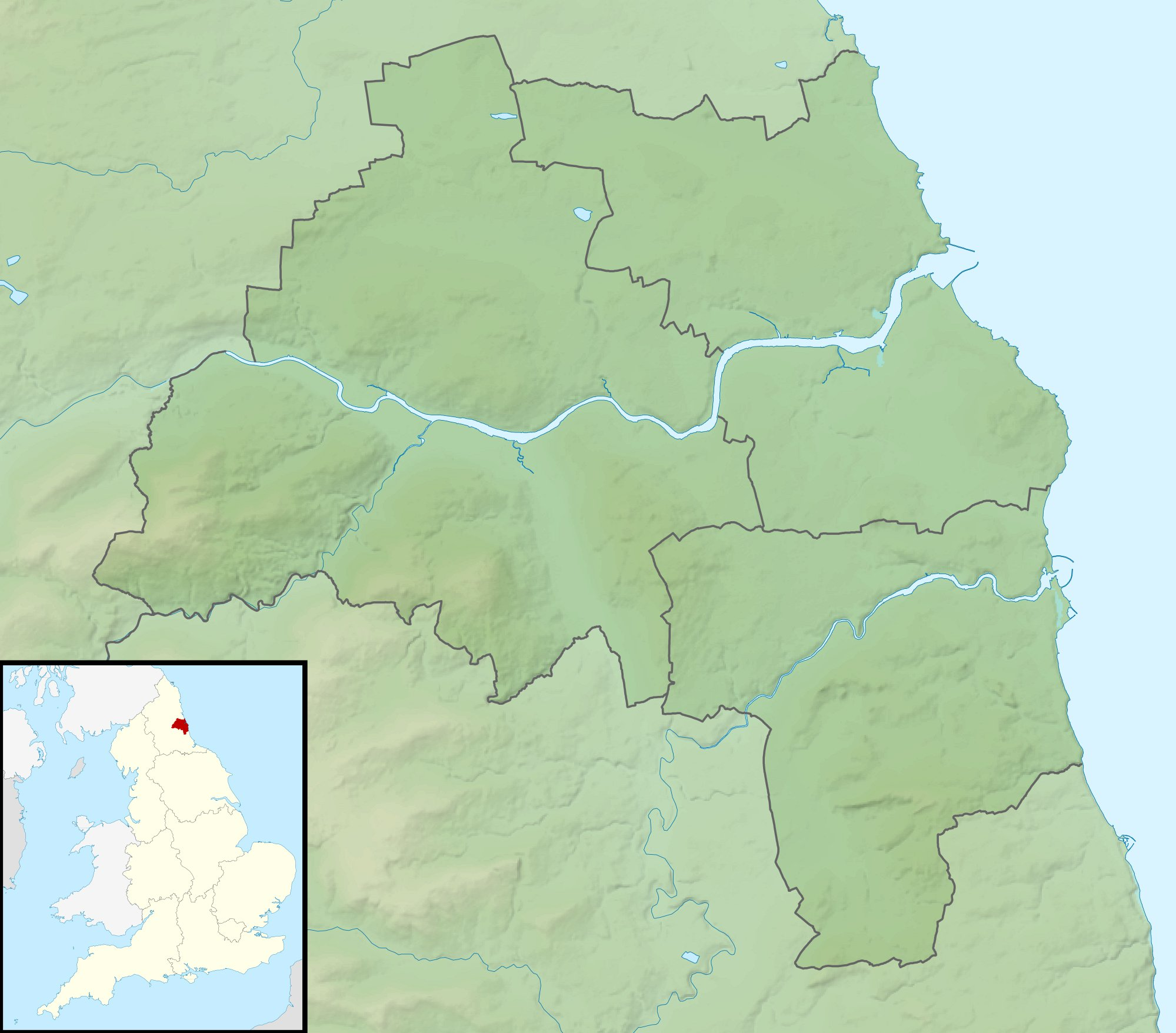
- Location in Tyne and Wear

Location
- Location: Tyne and Wear, England, UK
- Coordinates: 55.009°N 1.433°W
- OS grid: NZ363683

North Shields Fish Quay is a fishing port located close to the mouth of the River Tyne, in North Shields, Tyne and Wear, North East England, 8 miles (13 km) east of the city of Newcastle upon Tyne.

The quay was established in 1225 as shielings village (seasonal huts used by hunters or fishermen) around the Pow Burn; the town of North Shields, where it takes its name from the shielings. The quay was originally located to serve the nearby Tynemouth Castle and Priory. The original site is largely derelict industrial land currently being redeveloped, which belonged to the original Tyne Brand canning company. The Pow Burn runs from nearby Northumberland Park and disappears underground at Tynemouth Road and the Metro urban transport line, eventually flowing into the Tyne.

The development of North Shields was restricted due to the neighbouring port, Newcastle upon Tyne, which was the region's leading port at the time. Its trade guilds resented trade outside of the city, so that coal mined in North Shields within 300 ft (91.4 m) of the river had to be transported on land 8 miles to Newcastle to be loaded onto boats.

In the 18th and 19th centuries, the North Shields Fish Quay High Light and Low Light lighthouses, which now are defunct, provided a line of sight for vessels entering from the river mouth. Before the north and south piers were built, many ships foundered on the rocks known as the Black Middens, which lie to the east of the quay and can be seen at low tide.

The site has an original Old High Light and Old Low Light as well as High Light and Low Light, called so because they were positioned low (at river level on the quay) and high (on the bank top some 150 ft higher (46 m)).

The present quay was built in 1870 to accommodate the increase in fishing boats after the introduction of steam trawlers. It is the largest English port for prawns. Its proximity to the Dogger Bank has led fishing boats from Whitby and elsewhere on the north east coast to relocate there. Adjacent shops include fish outlets and fish processing facilities, mainly of crab and prawn.

The Fish Quay was once the biggest kipper producer in the UK, but the fall in herring stocks has reduced the trade to a single smokery. A number of traditional smokehouses still exist but have been converted to other uses, the area having been substantially repurposed to include residential accommodation, eateries and other entertainment facilities. However, although much reduced, a healthy seafood trade still exists with daily refrigerated lorry movements.

Clifford's Fort, located on the Fish Quay, was built in 1672 as a coastal defence against the Dutch, and also played a role during the Napoleonic Wars. The fort was named after Lord Clifford, a member of King Charles II's Cabal. It is now a scheduled monument.

The Fish Quay declined in the 1980s as a result of problems in the fishing industry. Refurbishment of the area was begun by Tyne and Wear Development Corporation and then beginning in 2001 based on a consultancy report. The Old Low Light building has been converted into a heritage centre, which opened in 2015.

== Festival ==
The annual North Shields Fish Quay Festival began in 1987 as a community event and by 2001 had been renamed Window on the World (WOW). It brought in big-name music acts and by 2002 had a budget of £350,000 and was contributing an estimated £11 million to the local economy. For 2003, on cost grounds, the festival became the Fish Bay Family Festival and was relocated east of the Fish Quay.

In 2006, North Tyneside Council decided to suspend the festival because of concerns about safety since the area was being redeveloped, and recommended that it should become a heritage festival. It has not resumed; the Mouth of the Tyne Festival, which is held jointly by South Shields and Tynemouth, is now the local annual festival.
