= Murton, Tyne and Wear =

Village in North Tyneside, England

Coordinates: 55.031°N 1.487°W

Murton
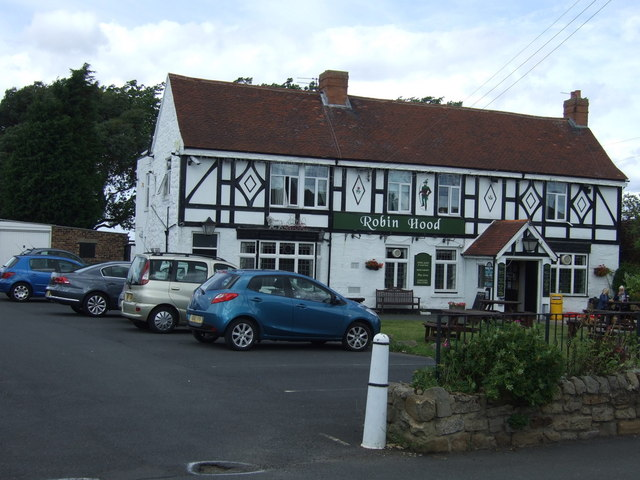
- Robin Hood pub

- Location within Tyne and Wear
- OS grid reference: NZ328708
- Metropolitan borough: North Tyneside
- Metropolitan county: Tyne and Wear
- Region: North East
- Country: England
- Sovereign state: United Kingdom
- Post town: NEWCASTLE UPON TYNE
- Postcode district: NE27
- Dialling code: 0191
- Police: Northumbria
- Fire: Tyne and Wear
- Ambulance: North East
- UK Parliament: Tynemouth

Murton is a small village in the metropolitan borough of North Tyneside, in the ceremonial county of Tyne and Wear, England. The village is separated by fields from the nearby areas of West Monkseaton, New York, Earsdon and Shiremoor. Until 1974 Murton was in Northumberland. Murton was a civil parish between 1866 and 1935. In 1931 the parish had a population of 1164.

The village contains a public house, the Robin Hood, and an equestrian centre.

Murton Farmhouse on the New York Road is a Grade II listed building, with parts dating from the 18th century.

== Governance ==
Murton was formerly a township in the parish of Tynemouth, from 1866 Murton was a civil parish in its own right, on 1 April 1935 the parish was abolished and split between Tynemouth County Borough and Whitley and Monkseaton Urban District, with a part also going to Seaton Valley.
