= High and Low Lights of North Shields =

Lights of North Shields
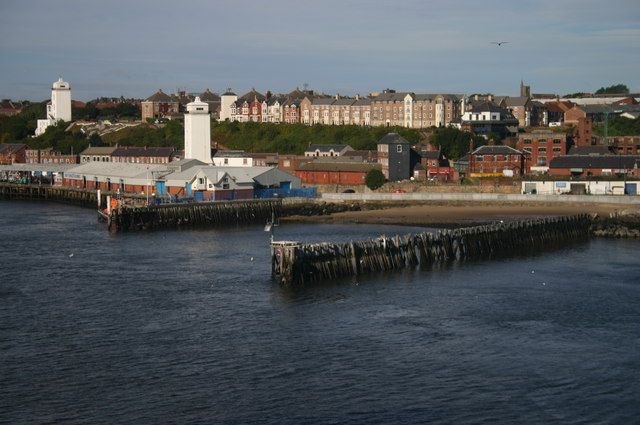
- The North Shields Lights viewed from the river
- Location: North Shields, United Kingdom

Tower
- Constructed: 1727
- Fish Quay Old Low Light
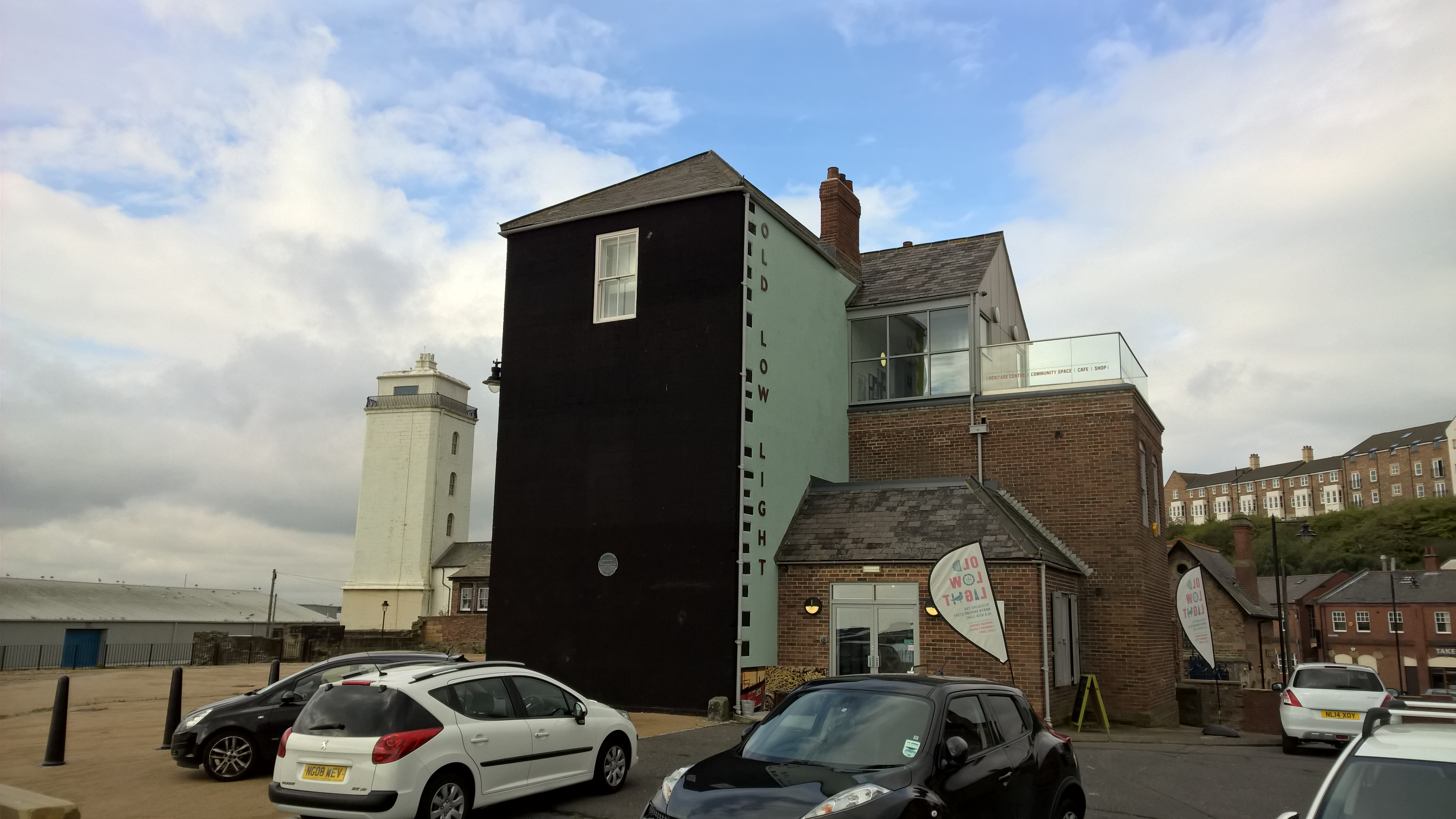
- The 18th century Old Low Light
- Constructed: 1727
- Construction: brick (tower)
- Shape: square
- Operator: Newcastle-upon-Tyne Trinity House (–1810), Tyne & Wear Building Preservation Trust
- Deactivated: 1810
- Fish Quay Old High Light
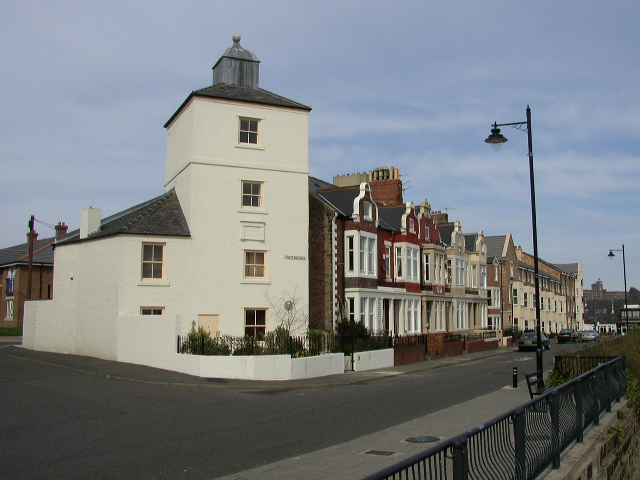
- The 18th century Old High Light
- Constructed: 1727
- Construction: brick (tower)
- Shape: square tower with lantern on the roof attached to a dwelling
- Markings: White (tower)
- Operator: private residence
- Deactivated: 1810
- Fish Quay Low Light
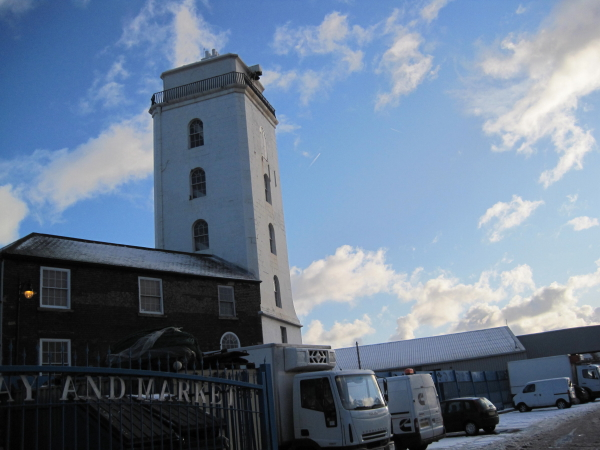
- Constructed: 1807
- Construction: stone (tower)
- Height: 26 m (85 ft)
- Shape: massive square tower with small lantern on the roof
- Markings: White (tower)
- Operator: Newcastle-upon-Tyne Trinity House (–1990s), Port of Tyne
- Deactivated: 1999
- Focal height: 25 m (82 ft)
- Range: 13 nmi (24 km; 15 mi)
- New High Light
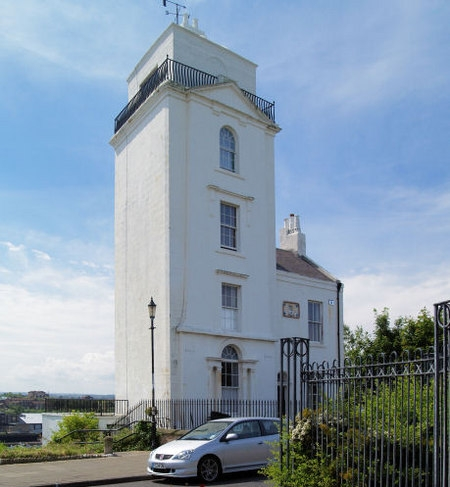
- High Light attached to keeper's dwelling
- Constructed: 1807
- Construction: stone (tower)
- Height: 18 m (59 ft)
- Shape: square tower with small lantern on the roof attached to a building
- Markings: White (tower)
- Operator: Newcastle-upon-Tyne Trinity House (–1990s), Port of Tyne
- Heritage: Grade II listed building
- Deactivated: 1999
- Focal height: 42 m (138 ft)
- Range: 16 nmi (30 km; 18 mi)
- Characteristic: F W

The High and Low Lights of North Shields are decommissioned leading lights in North Shields, Tyne and Wear in the United Kingdom. Two pairs of lights survive: the older pair date from 1727 and were operational until 1810; the newer pair then took over, remaining in use until 1999. All four are listed buildings. They were sometimes known as the Fish Quay High and Low Lights, or (more precisely in terms of their individual locations) as 'Fish Quay (Range front)' and 'Dockwray Square (Range rear)'.

The first lighthouses were erected here in the 16th century by the Guild of the Blessed Trinity of Newcastle-upon-Tyne. By following a course which kept the two lights aligned, pilots were able to navigate along the Tyne, avoiding the dangerous Shields Bar and the Black Middens.

== Earliest lights ==
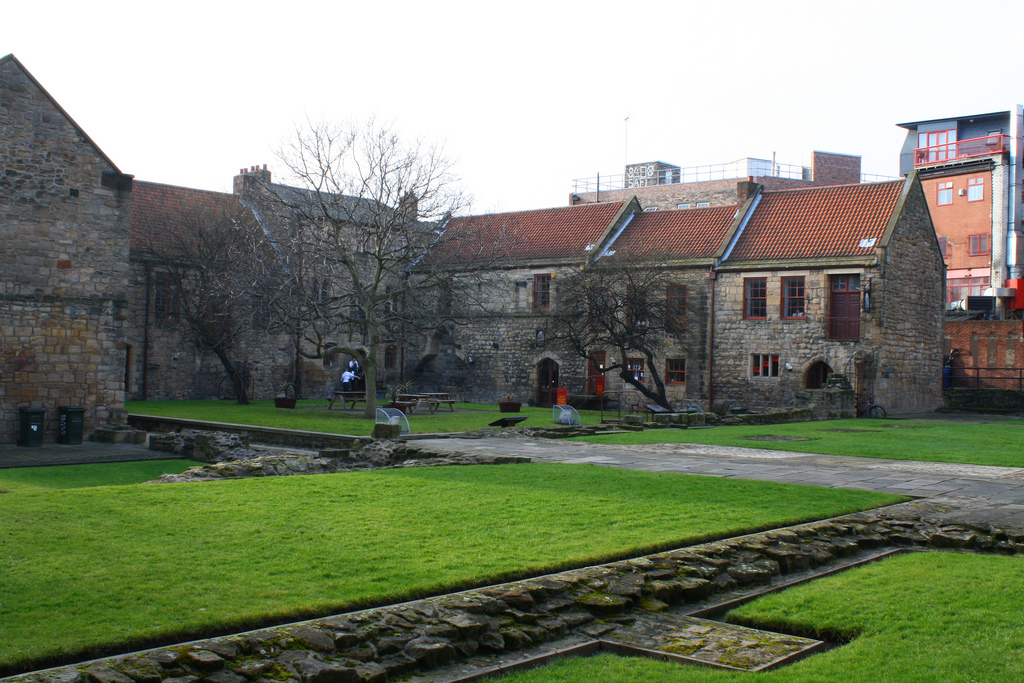
Site of the Black Friars' church: its stones were used to build the first pair of navigation lights at North Shields.

In 1536, a charter of Henry VIII gave permission to the Guild of the Blessed Trinity (which is known today as Trinity House of Newcastle) to build and embattle a pair of towers on the north bank of the River Tyne to serve as leading lights for safe navigation at the mouth of the river. The granting of the charter coincided with Henry's policy of dissolving England's monasteries and in 1539 he gave the monastic church of the town's Blackfriars monastery to the guild, which used its stonework to build the two towers.

Work began on the towers the following year: they were built on high and low ground either side of Pow burn, which flows into the Tyne at 'the Narrows' (the narrowest point of the river mouth). A keeper was paid 20 shillings a year to keep a tallow candle alight in each tower every night for a certain number of hours either side of high tide. To fund the provision and maintenance of these lights the guild was empowered to levy dues on every ship entering the port (initially 2d per English vessel and 4d per foreign vessel).

In 1608 a further ordinance was issued by James I requiring Newcastle's Trinity House to maintain a pair of lighthouses at North Shields. The towers were increased in height at around this time; they are depicted on Ralph Gardner's map of 1655, still with their battlements (they were built with a defensive as well as a navigational purpose in mind).

The changing position of sandbanks in the mouth of the river meant that the lights had likewise to change position from time to time. To try to address this, the lighthouses were replaced in 1658 by moveable wooden structures; these proved unreliable, however, and in the 1680s Newcastle's Trinity House was seeking funds to repair the stone towers.

In 1672 the Low Light found itself enclosed by Clifford's Fort, constructed that year to help defend the Tyne from coastal attack. A postern in the fort wall provided access to the lighthouse; however, in the years that followed a number of disputes arose between Trinity House and the Governor of the Fort. These came to a head in 1726 when a new Governor's House was built on the site, which obscured the light. It seems likely that this is what prompted the rebuilding of both lights in 1727.

== Old High and Low Lights ==
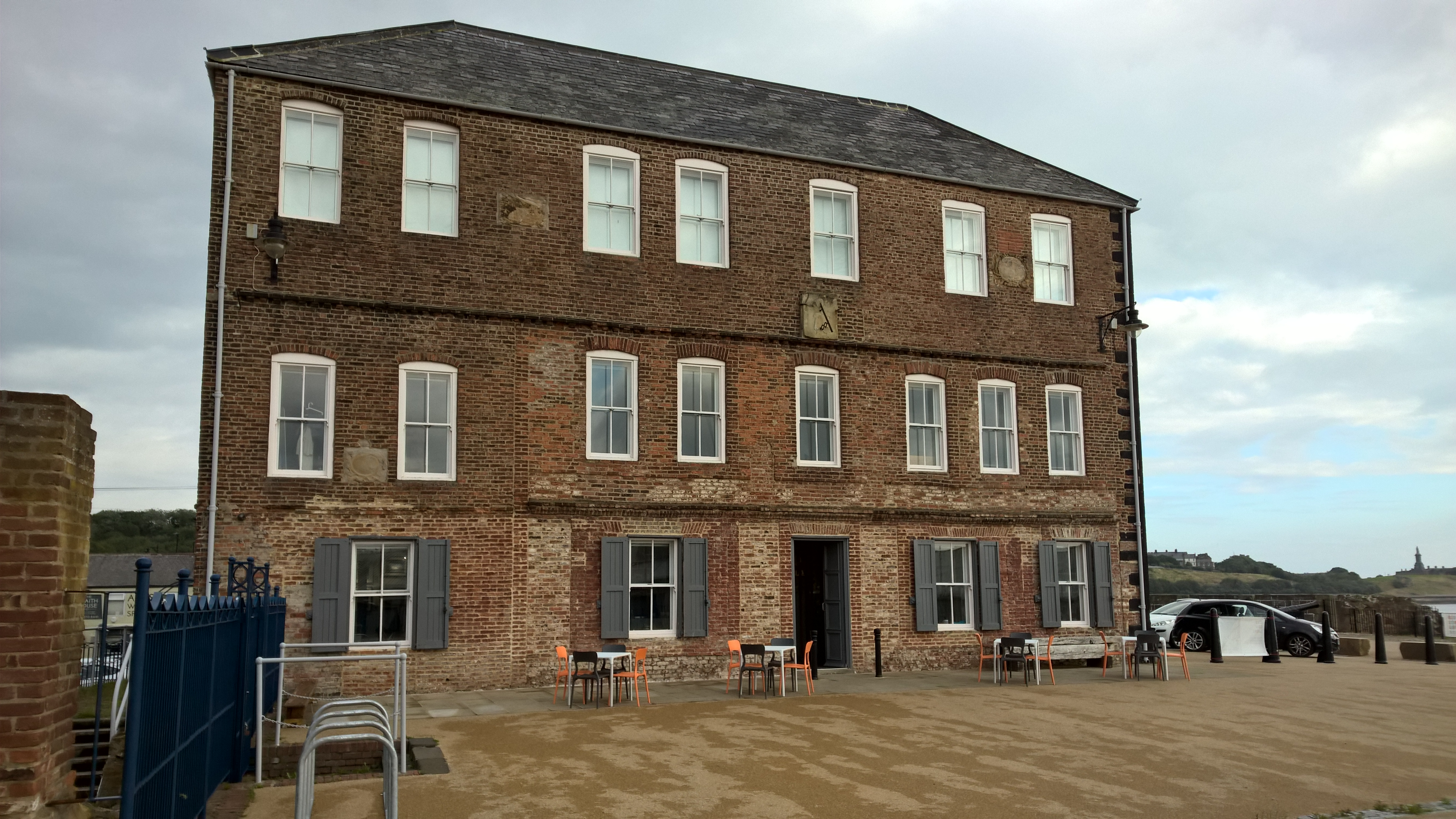
The Old Low Light viewed from the south

Initially, the 1727 High and Low Lights were each lit by three tallow candles. Copper reflectors were added in 1736, and in 1773 the candles were replaced by oil lamps. The Low Light was repaired and remodelled in 1733 and again in 1775 when the second floor was added. By 1805 the lights were no longer aligned with river channel and Newcastle Trinity House began building a new pair of lights in 1807.

=== Decommissioning and aftermath ===
When the New High and Low Lights were commissioned in 1810 the old lights were taken out of service and the white façade of the low light was painted black (to prevent it being confused with the new light when viewed from the water). In due course both Old Lights were converted by Trinity House into almshouses; the Old Low Light, with the addition of a pitched roof, reopened as Trinity Alms House in 1830.

At some later date the Old High Light became a private dwelling, and it remains so today; it is a grade II listed building. The Old Low Light is also grade II listed and, as part of Clifford's Fort, stands within a scheduled monument. It served as a fish warehouse during the 20th century; saved from dereliction in 1988, it became a training centre for the Deep Sea Fisheries Association and latterly was occupied by the Maritime Volunteer Service. By the early 21st century the building was in a poor state of repair, but it was comprehensively refurbished after the MVS departed in 2011 and a modern annexe with viewing platform was added. The Old Low Light subsequently opened to the public in 2014 as a museum and community resource; it contains a ground-floor café, a permanent exhibition on the first floor (telling the history of the lighthouses, Clifford's Fort and Fish Quay) and an event space above it.

== New High and Low Lights ==
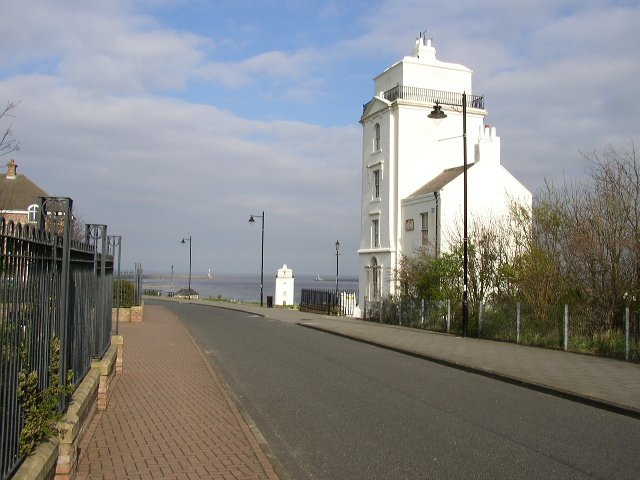
Looking out to sea past the Low Light (left) and High Light (right).

Work on the new lights was begun in 1807; both were designed for Trinity House, Newcastle-upon-Tyne, by local architect John Stokoe (1756–1836). Both towers are of white-painted ashlar, the High Light of four storeys, the Low Light of six, with curved windows; in each case the east face of the tower, facing the sea, is left plain and windowless (except on the lantern stage at the top where the lights shone out to sea). Above the lantern stage is a curved roof topped by a chimney. The lights were first lit on 1 May 1810. Each has a house attached for its keepers: that on the Low Light is dated 1816, while that on the High Light has a plaque with the Trinity House arms recording its rebuilding in 1860. By 1861 both lighthouses were lit by gas, each being equipped with a single burner set within a silvered reflector. In 1883 responsibility for the two lights was transferred from Newcastle Trinity House to the Tyne Improvement Commission. In December 1927, the commission converted the two lights from incandescent gas to electricity. The new 100,000 candle-power lights had a range of 17 nautical miles (31 km; 20 mi); they were fitted with automatic lamp changers and an incandescent gas lamp was also retained as an emergency standby in the event of a power cut.

=== Decommissioning ===
In 1999 the lighthouse at Herd Groyne on the opposite bank of the Tyne had a high-intensity sector light installed for navigation into Tynemouth and along the river, whereupon the High and Low Lights were decommissioned and the buildings sold for housing. The towers, however, continue to serve as daymarks for vessels entering the Tyne and both are Grade II listed buildings.

Each New Light stands close to its predecessor: the Low Lights are on Fish Quay, alongside the remains of Clifford's Fort, and the High Lights are at Dockwray Square, on the ridge above the quay to the west.

== See also ==
- List of lighthouses in England

== Sources ==
- History of the Old Low Light, The Net, 19 March 2012, archived from the original on 15 July 2014
- Northern Counties Archaeological Services (May 2010), The Old Low Light, No. 54 Clifford's Fort, North Shields, Tyne and Wear; (NZ 363081 684810) Conservation Statement (PDF), North Tyneside Council
- Appleby Miller, R.N. (October 1930), "History of the High and Low Lights", Smith's Dock Journal: 249–255
- Lawrence, Danny (2011), The Making of Stan Laurel: Echoes of a British Boyhood, McFarland, ISBN 978-0786485154
