= Black Middens =

Tyne reef

Coordinates: 55°00′44″N 1°25′18″W

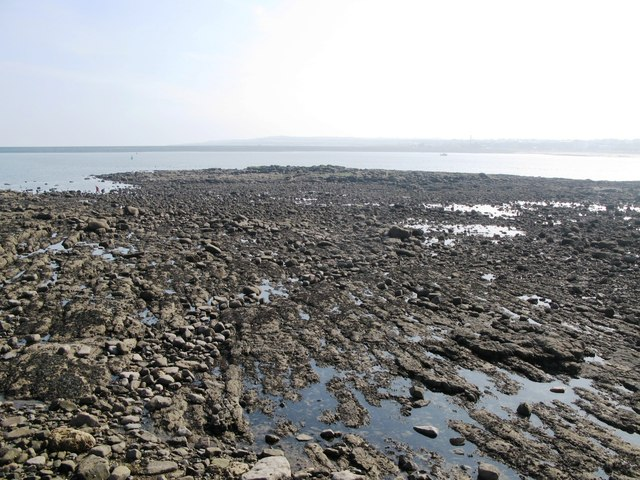
The Black Middens

The Black Middens is a reef at the mouth of the River Tyne in North East England, noted for the danger it poses to shipping.

== Shipping hazard ==
The Black Middens is particularly dangerous as it is mostly below the water at high tide when shifting sand bars form around it. Many ships have been blown on to the Black Middens and wrecked – five ships during three days of storms in 1864, whose wrecks resulted in 34 deaths within close sight of the shore. In order to mitigate such disasters, the Lights of North Shields were constructed in 1536 on the orders of Henry VIII, to guide mariners into the river. The first Volunteer Life Brigade was formed in Tynemouth in 1864, to rescue sailors who navigated into danger despite the lights.

Ships have run aground on the Black Middens as late as the 1970s.

== Name ==
Midden is a Scandinavian word, common in a number of north-east English dialects, used to describe a heap or dump of domestic waste; local legend has it that the devil threw the Black Middens into the Tyne to spoil the rich trade in coal shipped from Newcastle.

== History ==
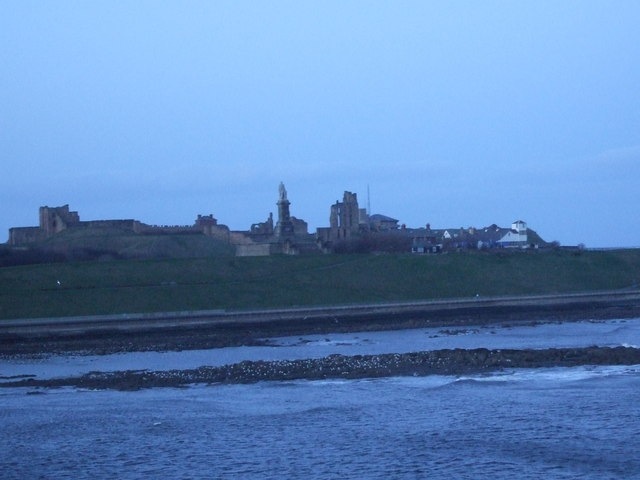
On shore, behind the Black Middens, is the Collingwood Memorial, Tynemouth Castle and Priory.

A fishery was long based here, extending from the Black Middens to Howdon Head. In the 15th century, the Prior of Tynemouth had three fishing weirs; large isolated rocks nearby are known as the Prior's Rocks or Stones. In the 17th century, it was known as Robert Ramsey's fishery. In the 18th century, nets were used and hundreds of salmon were caught.
