= New York, Tyne and Wear =

Village in England

Coordinates: 55.0271°N 1.4884°W

New York
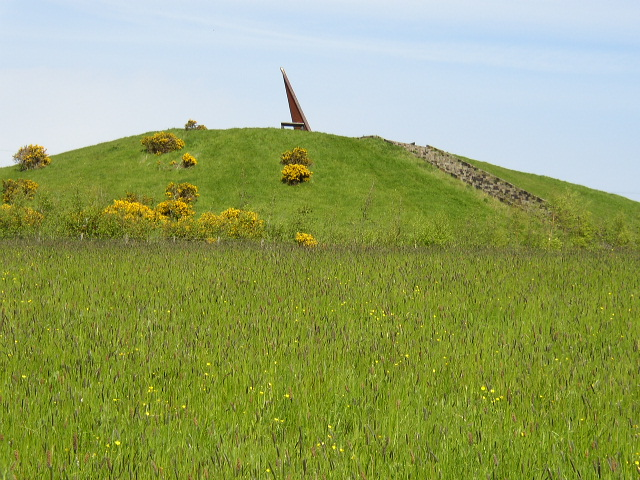
- Silverlink Park Sundial
- OS grid reference: NZ328704
- Metropolitan borough: North Tyneside
- Metropolitan county: Tyne and Wear
- Region: North East
- Country: England
- Sovereign state: United Kingdom
- Post town: NORTH SHIELDS
- Postcode district: NE29
- Dialling code: 0191
- Police: Northumbria
- Fire: Tyne and Wear
- Ambulance: North East
- UK Parliament: Tynemouth

New York is a suburban village in the metropolitan county of Tyne and Wear, North East England. Approximately 4 miles from Whitley Bay, and 5 miles from the town of Tynemouth, it locally governed as part of the metropolitan borough of North Tyneside. It was named after New York, following the British capture of the city in 1777.

== History ==
There had been a settlement in existence on the location of New York since Anglo-Saxon England where it occupied a crossroads between Monkwearmouth-Jarrow Abbey and docks for Lindisfarne Monastery. It did not have an official name until during the American War of Independence when it was named "New York" after New York City following the British capture of the city. It was also due to the village being formally founded then and being located near a now-vanished village that similarly shared a name from the Thirteen Colonies, "Philadelphia".

New York had its own blacksmiths' forge from the 1760s until 2016, when the landowner sold the land that it was leased on for redevelopment. New York was located near Algernon Colliery, until the coal pits closed in 1966. The road to the pits crossed a disused London and North Eastern Railway line. The North Tyneside Steam Railway and Stephenson Railway Museum are located in New York. In 1969, it was considered by the government to be a part of a redevelopment project aimed at North Shields.

== War memorial ==
In 1921, New York constructed a war memorial to victims of the First World War. It was designed by local architect W.H. Endean and was constructed out of sandstone in the shape of a celtic cross. In 2012, it received grade II listed status for having a "...strong cultural and historical significance within both a local and national context". In 2014, North Tyneside Council announced a £100,000 fund to repair local war memorials, including the New York War Memorial, in time for the centenary of the First World War.

== See also ==
- Shiremoor Metro station
