= Newcastle-upon-Tyne Trinity House =

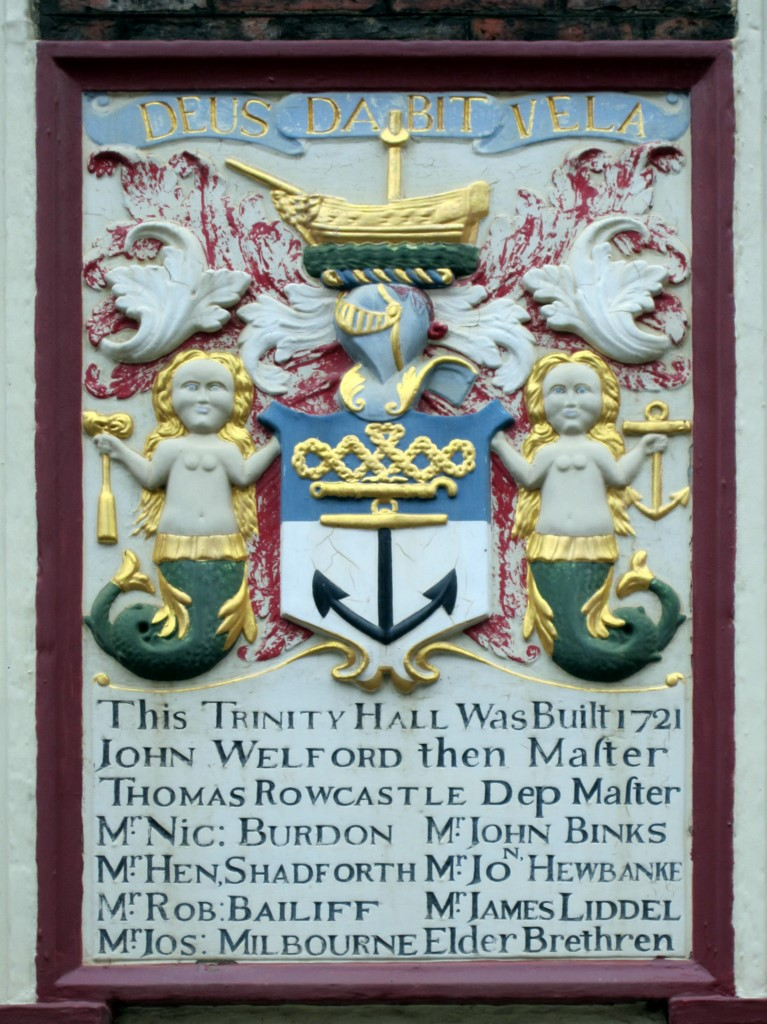
- The arms of the corporation, as displayed on a plaque in the main courtyard.
- Established: 4 January 1505; 521 years ago
- Type: Registered Charity
- Legal status: Charity No. 243369
- Purpose: Maritime services and support
- Professional title: The Master Pilots and Seamen of the Corporation of the Trinity House, Newcastle-upon-Tyne
- Headquarters: Trinity House, Broad Chare
- Location: Broad Chare, Newcastle upon Tyne NE1 3DQ
- Coordinates: 54.9700°N 1.6054°W
- Region served: North East England
- Master: Captain R. D. Nelson
- Deputy Master: Captain S. C. Healy
- Website: www.trinityhousenewcastle.org.uk

Newcastle-upon-Tyne Trinity House is a private corporation in Newcastle upon Tyne which emerged in the 16th century as a guild formed by the City's seafarers. For the past 500 years it has occupied premises in Broad Chare on the Newcastle's Quayside, from which it continues to provide a combination of professional and charitable maritime services. It remains one of only three bodies in England authorized for the examination and licensing of deep-sea pilots.

== Origins ==
The 'Guild of the Blessed Trinity of Newcastle upon Tyne' emerged in the late 15th century, and was formally constituted on 4 January 1505 when it obtained an area of land close to the river on which to build a chapel, meeting room and lodgings for mariners (it was secured by the quit-rent of one red rose, payable annually to a Mr Ralph Hebborn on Midsummer's Day.) Early in its history, the corporation (as it came to be known) was given responsibility for improving the Tyne as a navigable river. For example, the first royal charter (received from Henry VIII in 1536) stipulated the building and fortification of a pair of towers at a certain point on the north bank, and the maintenance of lights thereon for the purposes of navigation. (These were precursors of the High and Low Lights which still stand today at North Shields).

== Premises ==
'Trinity House' is the name of the corporation's headquarters buildings by the Quayside, a site which it has occupied since the day of its foundation in 1505. Though there have been several rebuildings, some sixteenth-century (and older) fabric remains, and later 18th and 19th-century additions and restorations were sympathetic to the Tudor style of the original. A chapel, some offices, the banqueting hall and boardroom, along with the former school and several almshouse buildings, are arranged around three courtyards, described as 'the most pleasant exterior spaces' in the City. Entry is via a gateway on Broad Chare. The warehouses to the south of the gatehouse are currently leased to Live Theatre; they formerly housed the Trinity Maritime Museum, which closed in 2002.

== Later developments ==
Before long, the corporation was responsible for the licensing of mariners and pilots and for 'keeping the sea lanes' between Whitby and Berwick-upon-Tweed. At the same time, the corporation was (and had been since its early years) active in charitable work, including the provision of almshouses for aged mariners and the establishment of a school on its premises. The corporation was a high profile organisation in the city, for example hosting a visit by Archduke Frederick of Austria in 1841, and presenting him with a commemorative gold snuff box.

All these activities were financed principally through the levying of duties on every ship entering the Tyne to trade – a practice which only ceased in 1861. Following the passing of the Harbours and Passing Tolls, &c. Act 1861 (24 & 25 Vict. c. 45) in that year, the corporation began to devolve some responsibilities to other bodies; in particular, a new board took on responsibility for pilotage on the Tyne, and a new commission took on maintenance of the river's channels and buoyage, together with the corporation's lights at North and South Shields. Newcastle Trinity House continued though to be responsible for buoys, marks and lights along parts of the coast until the mid-1990s.

In the latter part of the 20th century the corporation's Trinity Maritime Museum occupied a pair of early Victorian warehouses on Broad Chare, adjacent to the main site. The museum closed in 2002 and the buildings are now leased by the Live Theatre Company.

== Present-day activities and governance ==
Today, the corporation remains active in the provision of professional and charitable maritime services. In addition to its work as a deep-sea pilot authority, it also offers a broader professional maritime consultancy service. It furthermore continues to provide charitable support for 'aged mariners and their widows', as well as varied educational programmes (raising an awareness of maritime history and practice among younger generations, including in schools). It is also committed to the upkeep of its historic buildings (which are nowadays regularly used for corporate and other events) and its extensive archives.

Trinity House has been a registered charity since 1966 and is governed by a royal charter of 1667. Its operation is overseen by an annually elected board; principal officers include the master, deputy master and several wardens with responsibility for different areas of activity. All are master mariners, except the secretary to the board. Mariners who are full members of the corporation are styled 'brethren'. Others wishing to support the work of the charity may join as 'associate members'. On formal occasions, the brethren wear a naval-style uniform (similar to that worn by their counterparts in Trinity House, London). The arms of the corporation are worn as a cap-badge and are also prominent on and in the buildings of Trinity House (not just those on Broad Chare, but also structures built and owned by the corporation in former years such as North Shields High Light).

Despite several similarities of nomenclature, structure and activity, Newcastle-upon-Tyne Trinity House is and always has been entirely independent of its namesake Trinity House in London. Trinity House, Kingston-Upon-Hull is similarly an independent body with past and continuing maritime responsibilities in and around the Humber, and there are also similar institutions in Scotland.

== Gallery ==
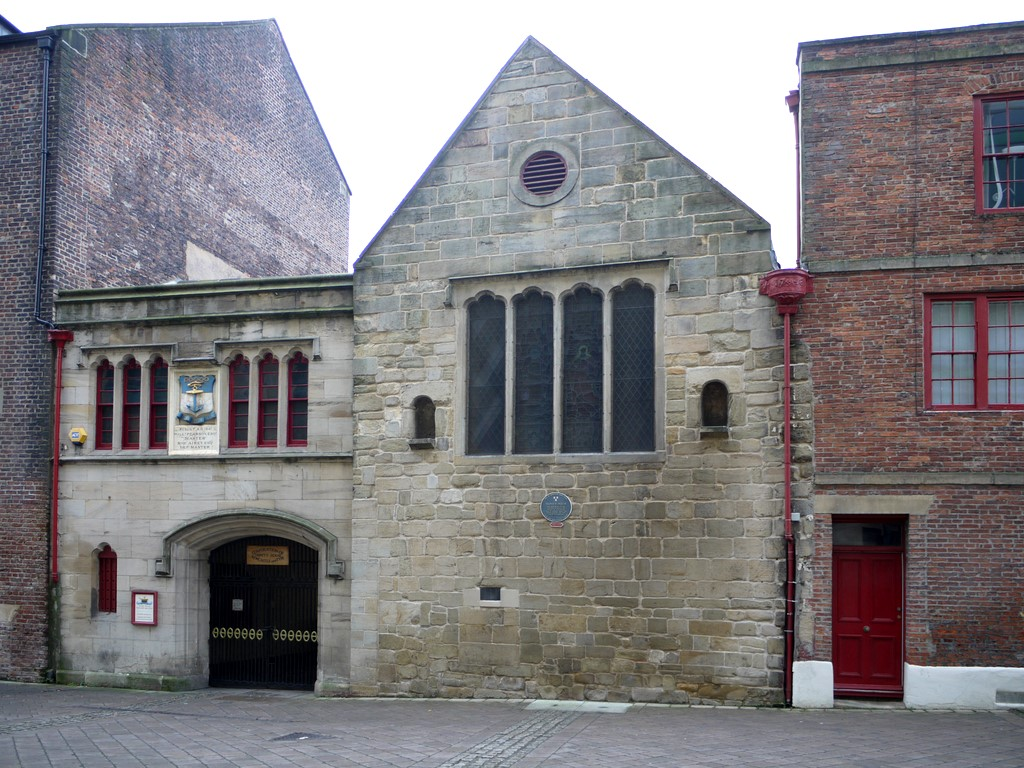
Entrance to the complex from Broad Chare (1841)

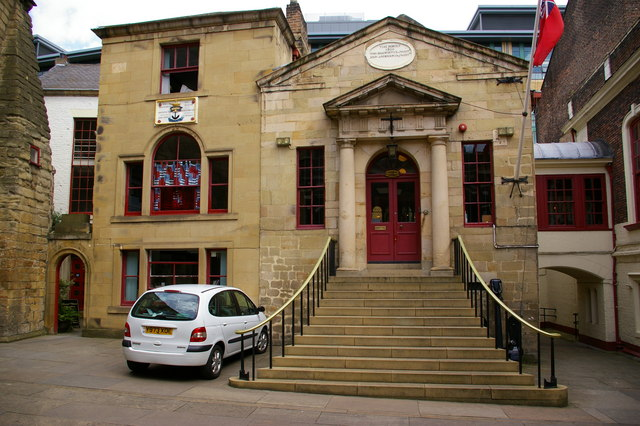
Secretary's Office (1849) and Chapel (of various dates), viewed from the main court yard

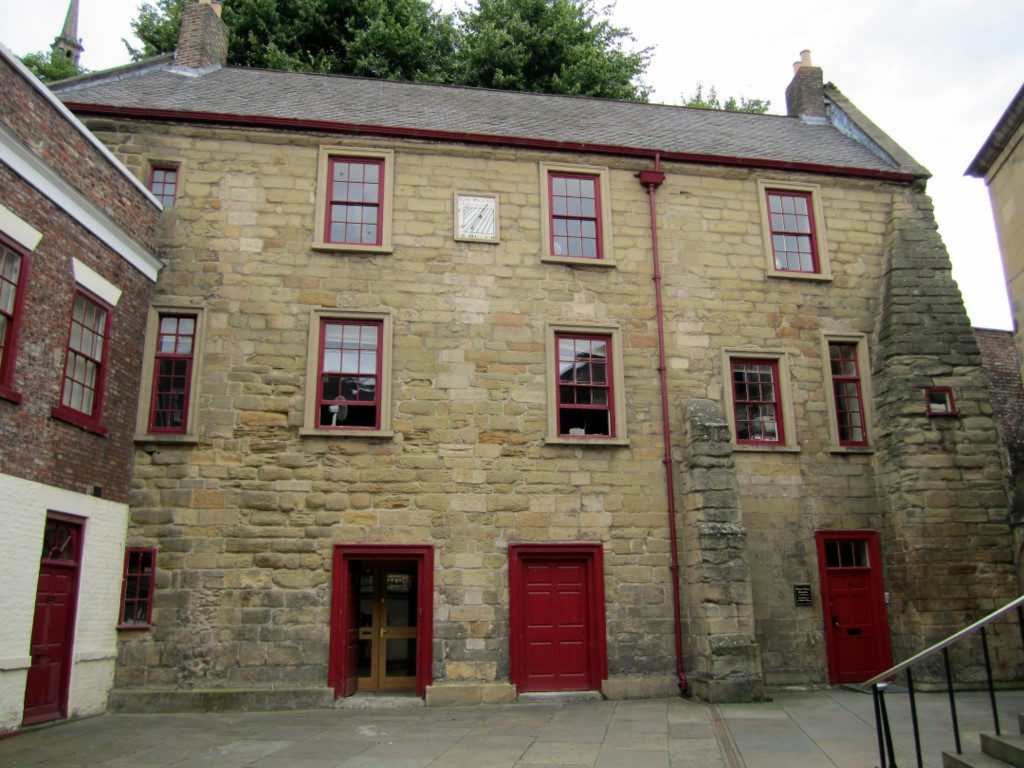
North wing of the main court yard, probably the oldest part of the complex (in part maybe 14th-century)

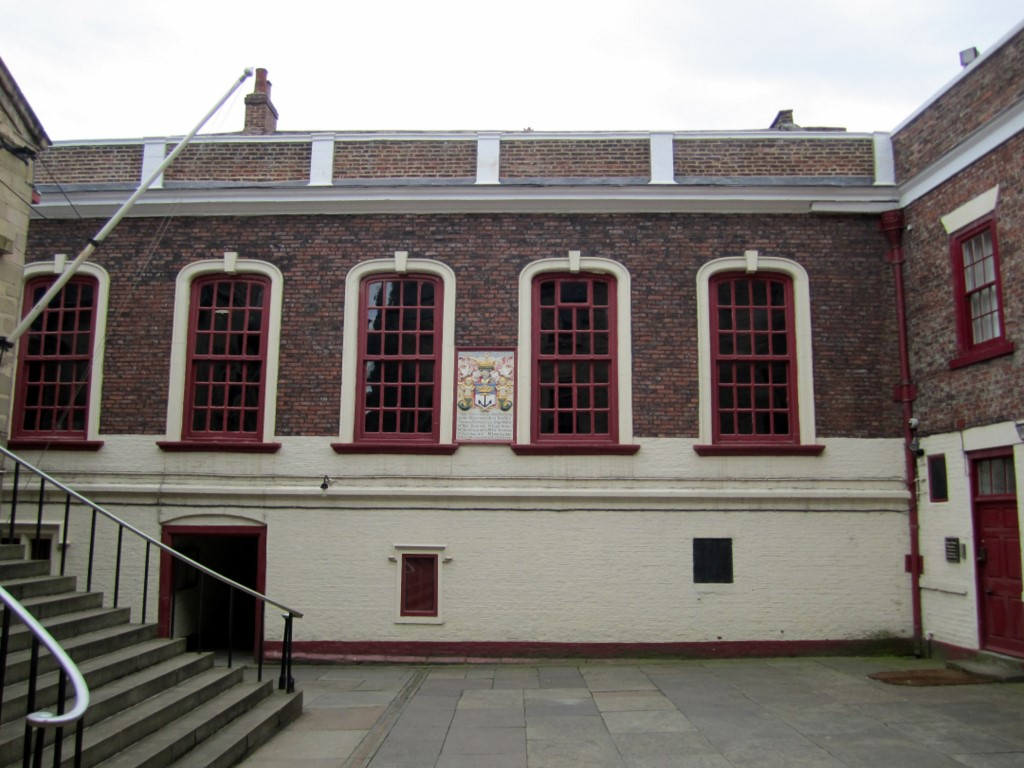
South side of the main court yard: the Banqueting Hall (rebuilt 1721) and Board Room (rebuilt 1791)

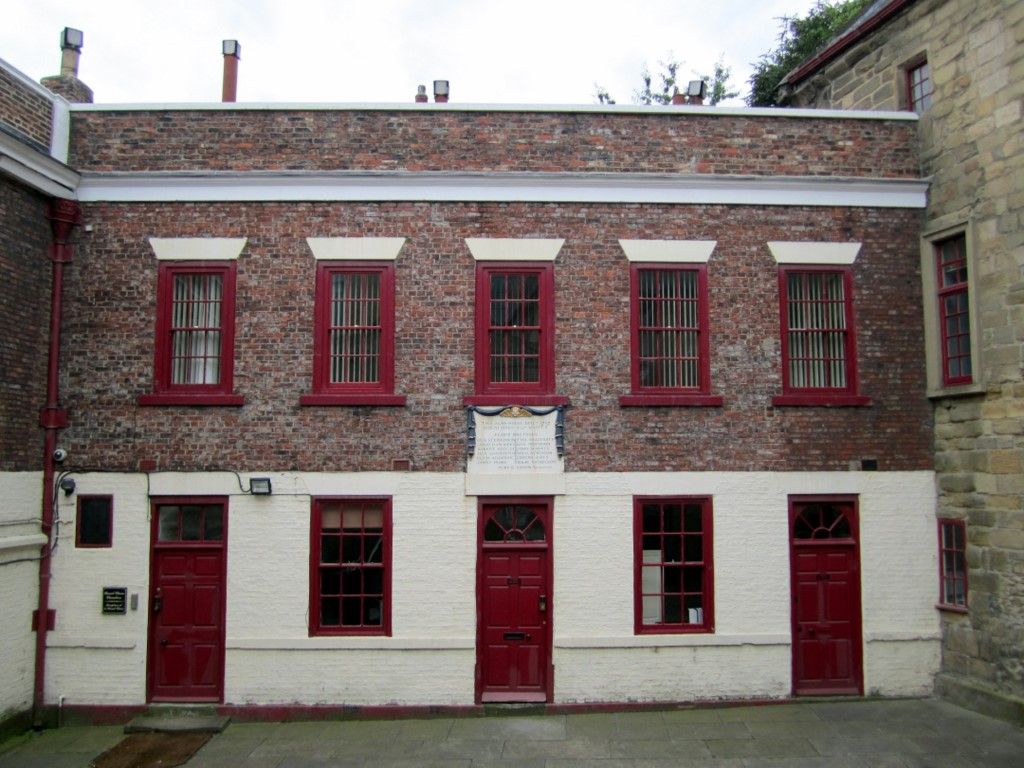
Former almshouses on the west of the court yard (rebuilt 1787)

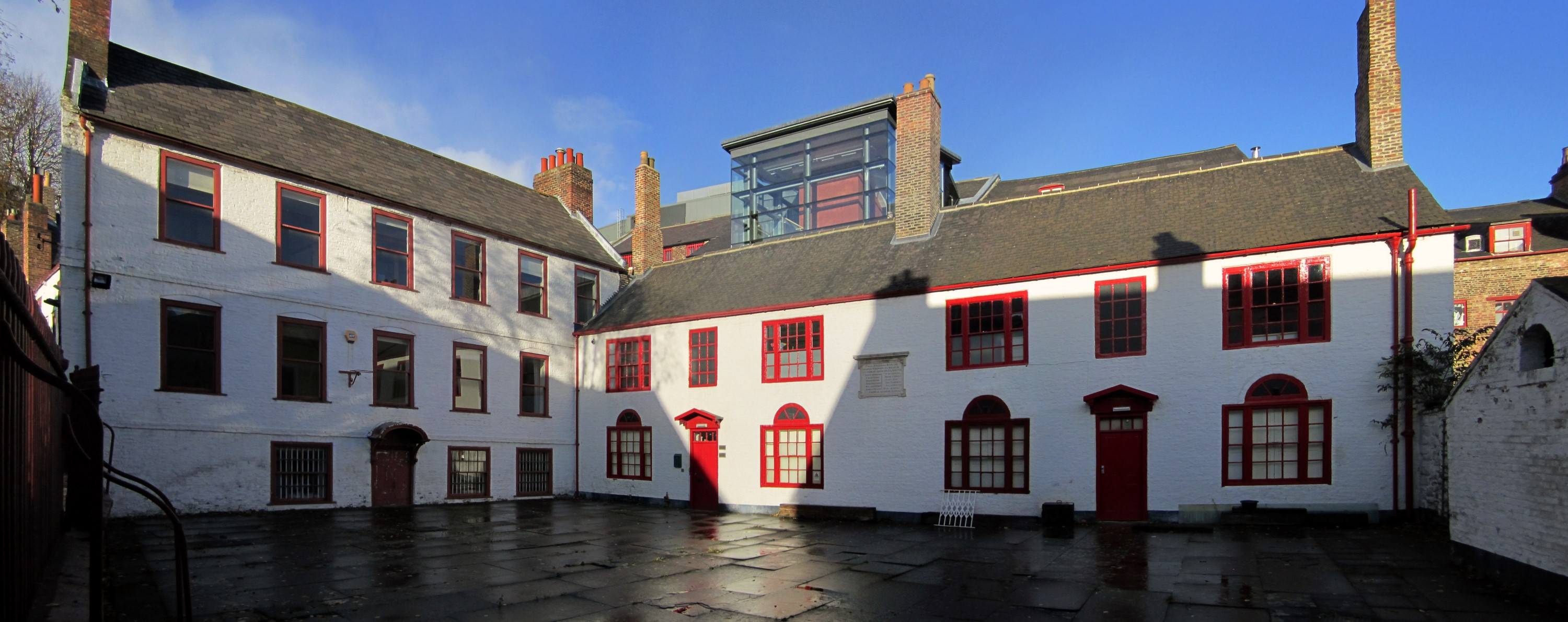
Low yard, adjacent to the main complex: part of the former School (left, rebuilt 1753) and more almshouses (1782).

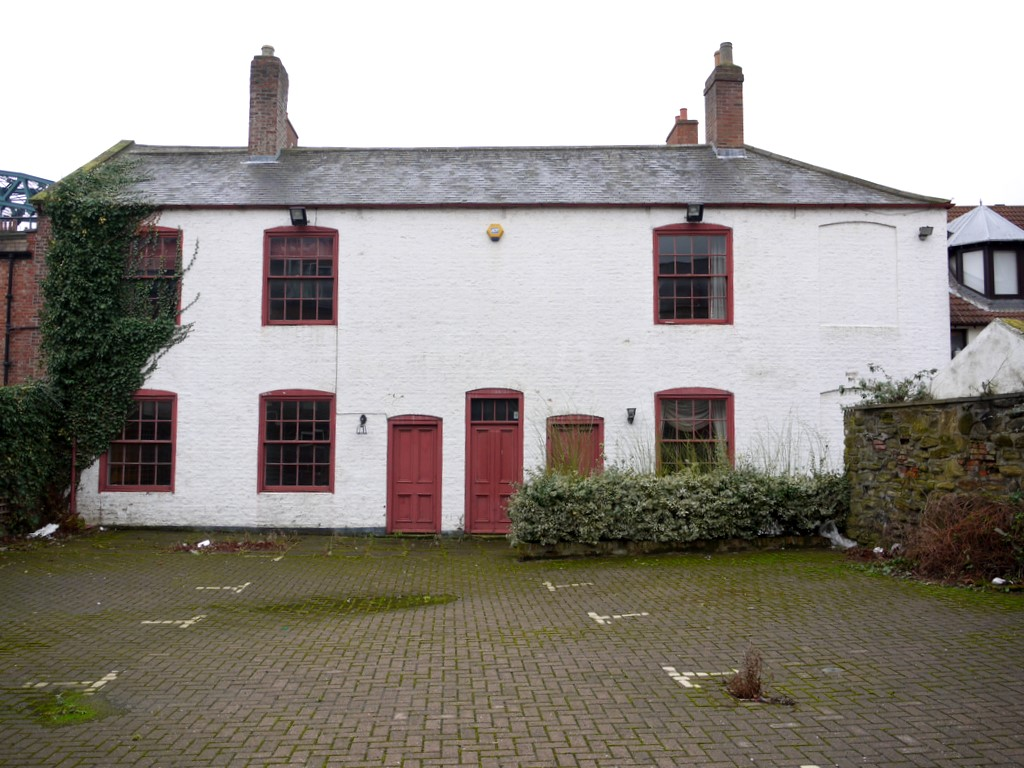
Further almshouses to the south (1820)
