= Tynemouth Priory and Castle =

Historic coastal site in north-eastern England

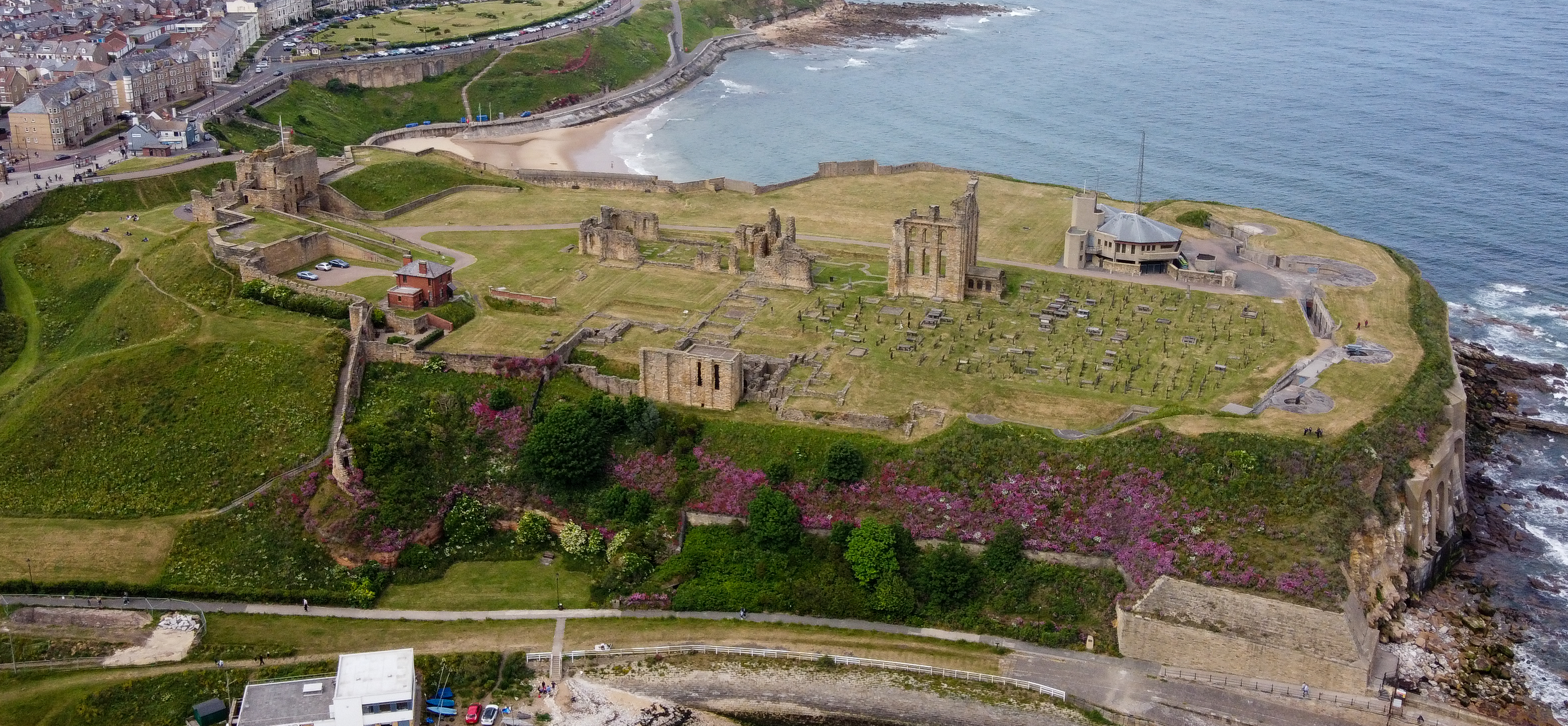
Aerial view of Tynemouth Priory and Castle

Tynemouth Priory and Castle is an historic site located on a promontory at the mouth of the Tyne at Tynemouth. The medieval Benedictine priory was protected by walls, towers, and a gatehouse. The heraldry of the metropolitan borough of North Tyneside includes three crowns commemorating the three kings who have been buried in the priory.

== Tynemouth Priory ==
Tynemouth Priory
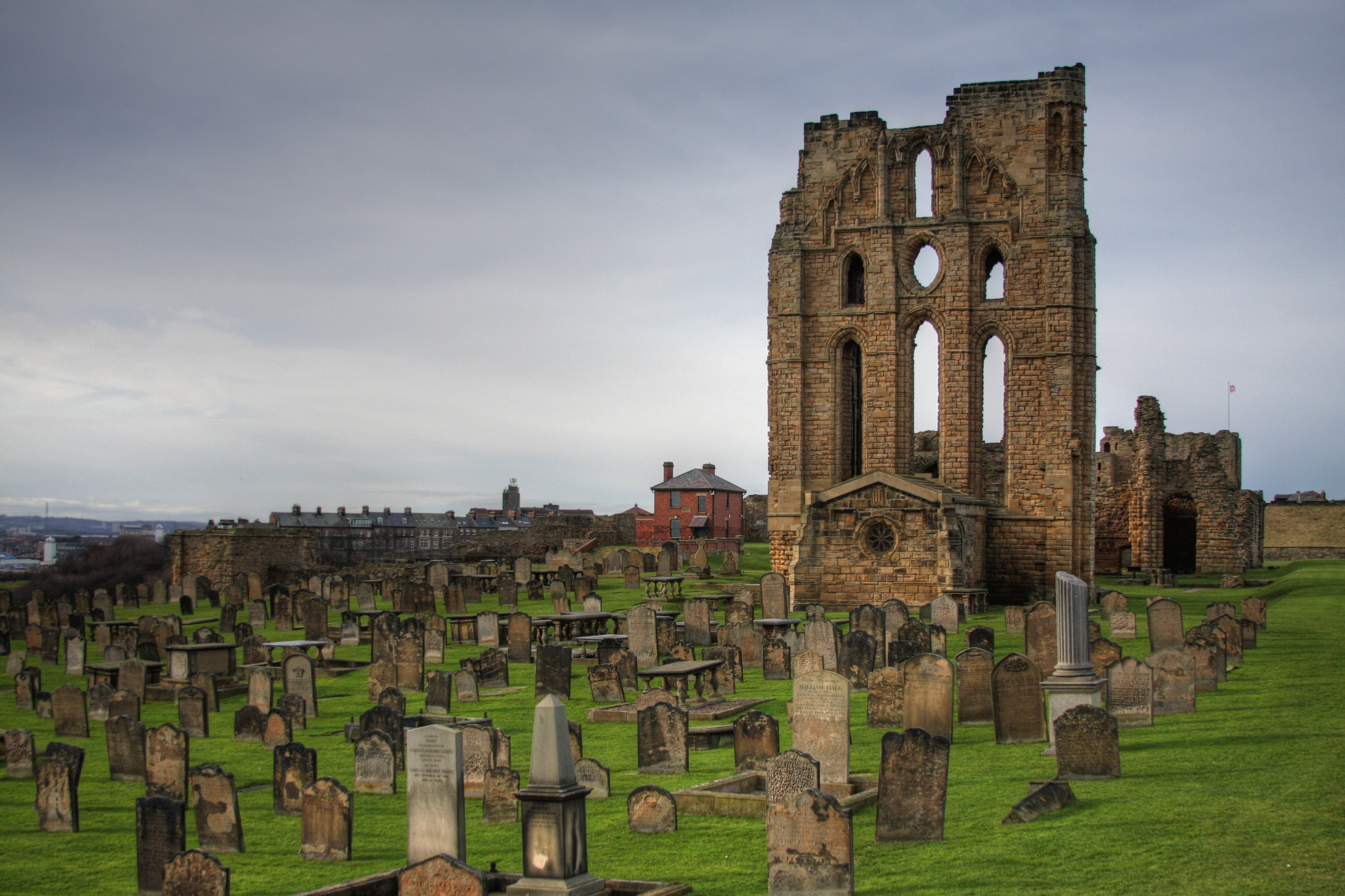
- The remains of Tynemouth Priory

- Shown within Tyne and Wear

Monastery information
- Order: Order of Saint Benedict
- Mother house: St Albans Abbey
- Dedication: St Oswine and the Virgin Mary

Architecture
- Status: Priory
- Functional status: Ruined
- Heritage designation: Scheduled monument

Site
- Location: Tynemouth, Tyne and Wear, England
- Coordinates: 55.0175°N 1.4189°W
- Public access: Yes

=== Early history ===
The earliest evidence for human habitation on the promontory are the trace remains of two circular wooden houses, the larger being typical of the Votadini tribe of the late Iron Age two centuries before the Roman invasion of AD 43 and the smaller being of the Roman period in the 2nd century.

The monastery was probably founded by one of the Anglian kings of Northumbria. Medieval traditions assert that it was founded in the mid-7th century when the Deiran king St Oswine, the first king to be buried at Tynemouth, was interred at the site by his murderer Oswiu, a Bernician king, who established the convent in penance. An abbey at the site is mentioned by Bede and, by 792, it was of enough significance to be the burial place of the Northumbrian king Osred II, the second king to be buried at Tynemouth. The monastery was a target for Viking raids throughout the 9th century until its destruction in 875 when Vikings under Halfdan Ragnarsson sailed into the River Tyne and sacked monasteries at Tynemouth and Jarrow, before setting up camp at Gateshead. No building survives from this period of the site's history but several fragments of Anglo-Saxon crosses have been found as well as trace remains of five rectangular wooden buildings.

A towered parish church dedicated to St Mary is recorded as having stood at the site in the mid-11th century by a chaplain of Tostig, Earl of Northumbria. The church was destroyed by William the Conqueror during the Harrying of the North.

In 1065, a corpse was exhumed at the ruined monastery thought to be that of St Oswine and, in 1083, the monastery was refounded by a monk of the Benedictine Monkwearmouth-Jarrow Abbey, which was a daughter cell of Durham Priory, named Turchil. However, in 1090 Robert de Mowbray, Earl of Northumbria, granted his lands in and around Tynemouth to St Albans Abbey leading to a longstanding dispute of jurisdiction between the monks of Durham and St Albans. Shortly after the grant, construction began on the new church which was dedicated to the Virgin Mary and St Oswine, whose shrine became a place of pilgrimage.

In 1093 Malcolm III, King of Scotland, was killed at the Battle of Alnwick, and he became the third king to be buried at Tynemouth. Alexander I later arranged for his father's body to be reburied at Dunfermline Abbey.

In 1105, Holy Trinity church in Old Bewick was given by Queen Matilda to Tynemouth Priory

On 20 August 1110, the shrine of St Oswine was ceremoniously transferred to the new church at Tynemouth from Jarrow marking the completion of its east end, while work on the nave continued. There was a fire in 1150 which destroyed the thatched dormitory, refectory, and guesthouse.

=== Tynemouthshire ===
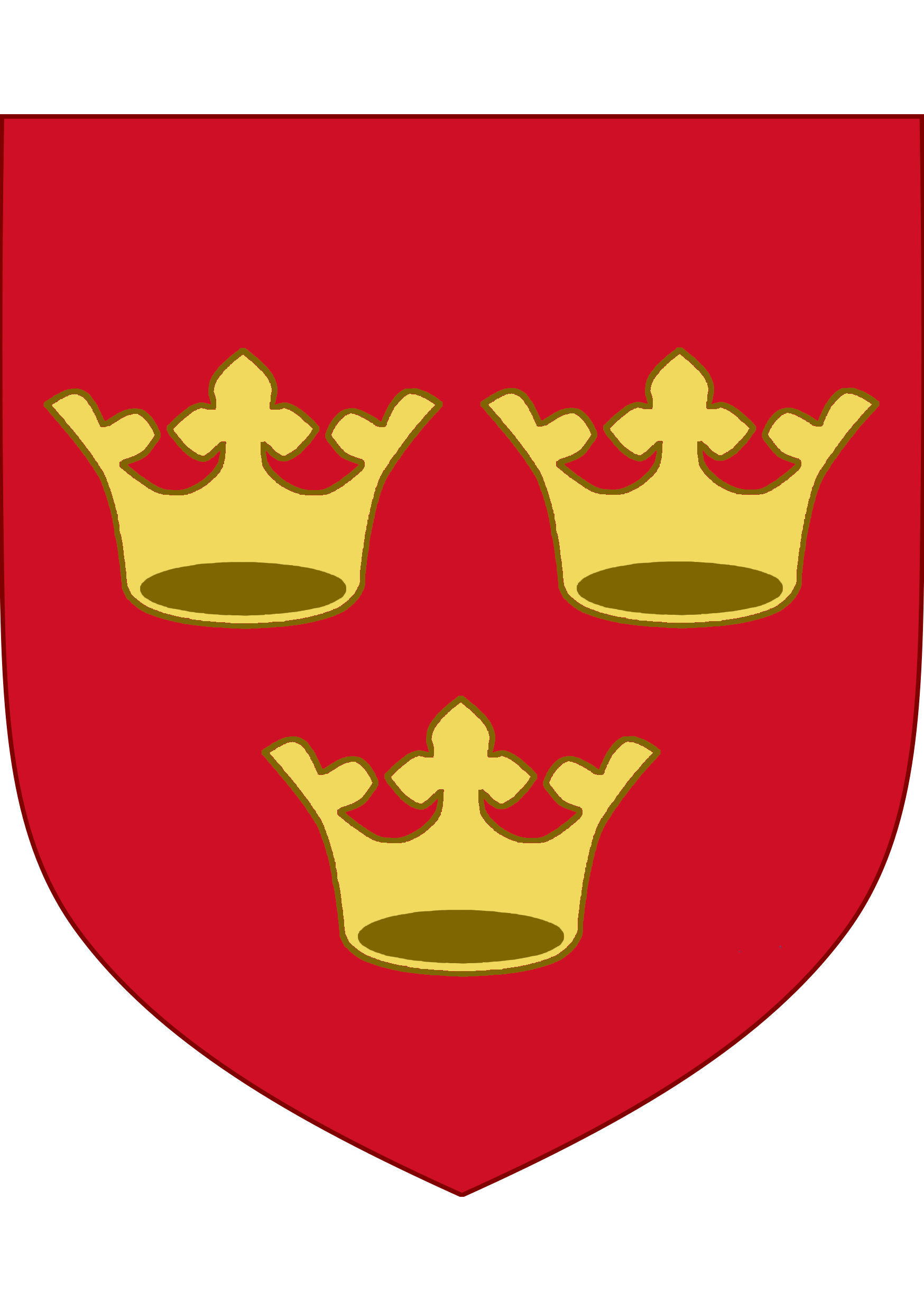
The arms of Tynemouthshire

The dispute between the monks of Durham and St Albans was resolved in 1174 with Tynemouth Priory remaining a daughter cell of St Albans Abbey. It was at this time that the priory received rights, privileges, and extensive lands which were confirmed by Richard I in 1189. The vast monastic estate became known as Tynemouthshire, or the Liberty of Tynemouth, from which the prior and convent profited from rents, produce, and coal. This newfound wealth led to a period of renovation and construction from 1190 to 1260. The choir and presbytery were completely rebuilt, the shrine of St Oswine was gilded by a goldsmith from St Albans named Baldwin, the nave was extended and given a new west front, windows in the refectory were repaired, and the chapter house was remodelled.

In the early 13th century, the prior developed North Shields to serve as the priory's port on the Tyne which caused tension with the burgesses of Newcastle who had previously held a monopoly on all coal, wool, and fish being transported and sold along the river. The mayor of Newcastle led a group of armed men and burnt the nascent fishing village to the ground in 1270. The priory was seeking independence from St Albans and so the abbot, together with the mayor and burgesses of Newcastle, convinced Edward I to suspend Tynemouth's trade and revoke the Liberty in 1290. However, due to the fortifications erected during the invasion of Scotland in 1296, Edward I and Margaret of France visited the priory regularly and had a private oratory built for their use. As thanks for the hospitality of the monks, the Liberty was restored and trade allowed to continue.

Adam FitzRoy, an illegitimate son of Edward II, died on 18 September 1322 whilst accompanying his father to Scotland and was buried at Tynemouth on 30 September 1322.

From the 13th century onwards, it was common for St Albans to send recalcitrant monks to Tynemouth as punishment. One such monk wrote a letter in the mid-14th century giving the first known written description of the priory:

Our house is confined to the top of a high rock and is surrounded by sea on every side but one. Here is the approach to the monastery through a gate cut out of the rock so narrow that a cart can hardly pass through. Day and night the waves break and roar and undermine the cliff. Thick sea frets roll in wrapping everything in a gloom. Dim eyes, hoarse voices, sore throats are the consequence... Shipwrecks are frequent. It is a great pity to see the numbed crew, whom no power on earth can save, whose vessel, mast swaying and timbers parted, rushes upon the rock or reef. No ringdove or nightingale is here, only grey birds which nest in rocks and greedily prey upon the drowned, whose screaming cry is a token of a coming storm... In the Spring the sea air blights the blossoms of the stunted fruit trees, so that you are lucky to find a wizened apple, though it will set your teeth on edge if you try to eat it. See to it, dear brother, that you do not come to this comfortless place. But the church is of wondrous beauty. It has been lately completed. Within it rests the body of the blessed martyr, Oswine, in a silver shrine, magnificently decorated with gold and jewels. He protects the murderers, thieves and seditious persons who fly to him and commutes their punishment to exile. He heals those whom no doctor can cure. The martyr's protection and the church's beauty furnish us with a bond of unity. We are well off for food, thanks to the abundant supply of fish of which we tire.

The church housing the shrine mentioned here refers to the Lady chapel which was built before 1336. The Percy chapel was added in the mid-15th century.

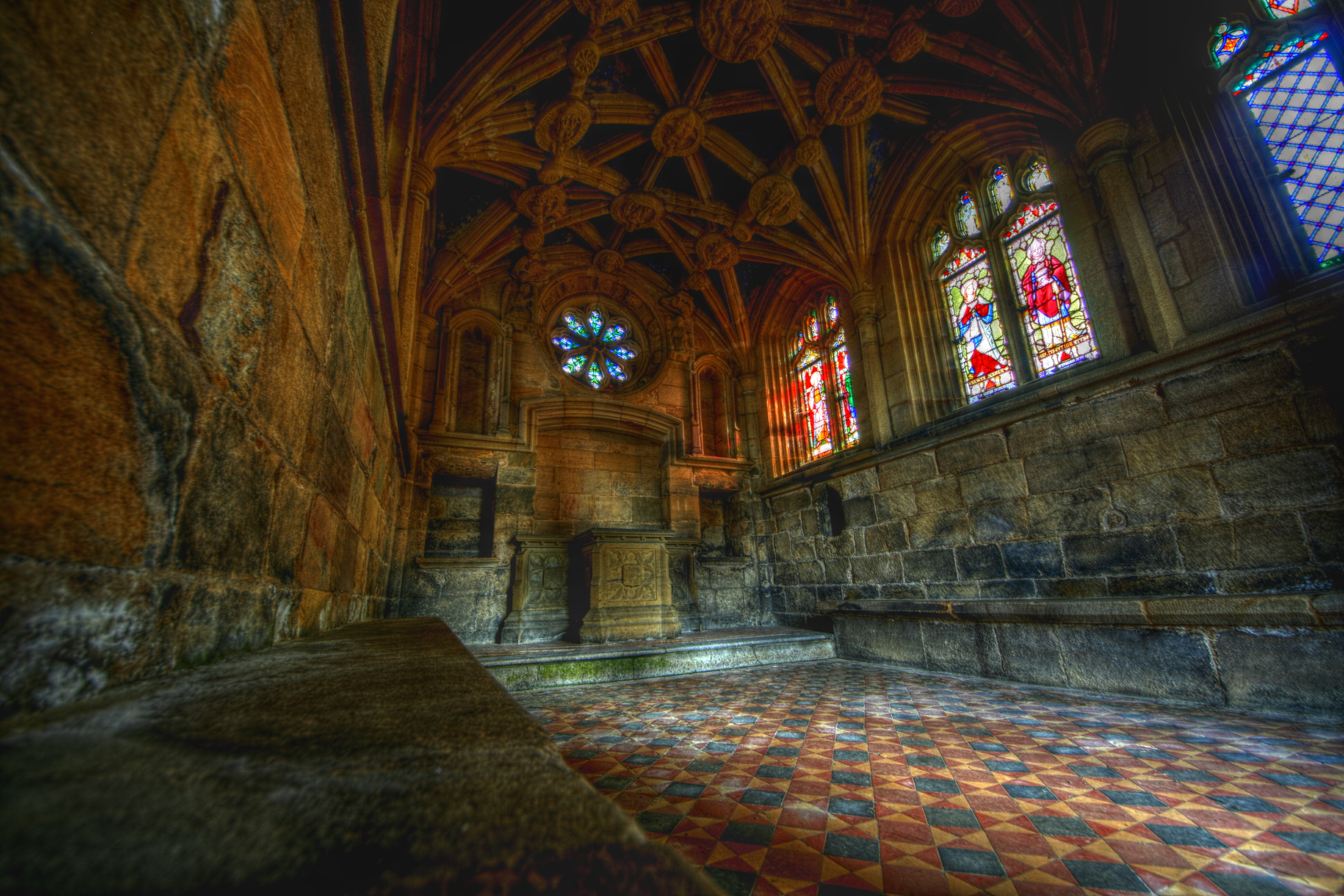
The Percy chapel

=== Dissolution of the monasteries ===
In the early 16th century, Tynemouth finally gained independence from St Albans, granted by Thomas Wolsey. However, shortly after in January 1539, the priory was suppressed by Henry VIII who took possession of all of the monastic lands and destroyed the shrine of St Oswine, bringing the priory to an end.

=== List of priors ===
Priors of Tynemouth
From	Until	Incumbent	Notes
1129		Remigius	
1148		Germanus	Elected abbot of Selby in 1153.
11...		Ruelendus	
		Geoffrey	
		Henry	Henry and Robert are listed in the Belvoir Obituary as priors of Tynemouth but without date. Their lack of surnames makes an early date probable.
		Robert	
		Gilbert	
Before 1189		Akarius	Later he was prior of St Albans and was elected abbot of Peterborough in 1200. He died in 1210.
c. 1200		Hugh Gubiun	
1208	c. 1217	Ralph Gubiun	Previously prior of Binham. Resigned c. 1217 and retired to St Albans. He died on 4 May 1223.
	1224	William de Bedford	Elected prior of Worcester and admitted on 21 November 1224. He died on 29 October 1242.
1227		Germanus	
1233		Walter de Bolum	He died on 2 January 1244.
1244	1252	Richard de Parco	Also known as Rufus, of Winchelcombe. Previously prior of Binham from 1226. He died on 25 April 1252.
1252		Ralph de Dunham	
c. 1265		William de Horton	
1273		Adam de Maperteshall	
1279		William Bernard	
1280		Simon de Walden	
1295		Adam de Tewing	
1305		Simon de Walden	
1311		Simon de Taunton	
1315		Richard de Tewing	
1340		Thomas de la Mare	
1349		Clement de Whethamstede	
1393		John Macrell of Whethamstede	Buried at Tynemouth.
1419		Thomas Barton	
1450		John Langton	
1478		Nicholas Boston	
1480		William Dixwell	
c. 1481		Nicholas Boston	
1503		John Bensted	
1512		John Stonewell	
1528		Thomas Gardiner	
1537		Robert Blakeney	

== Tynemouth Castle ==
Tynemouth Castle
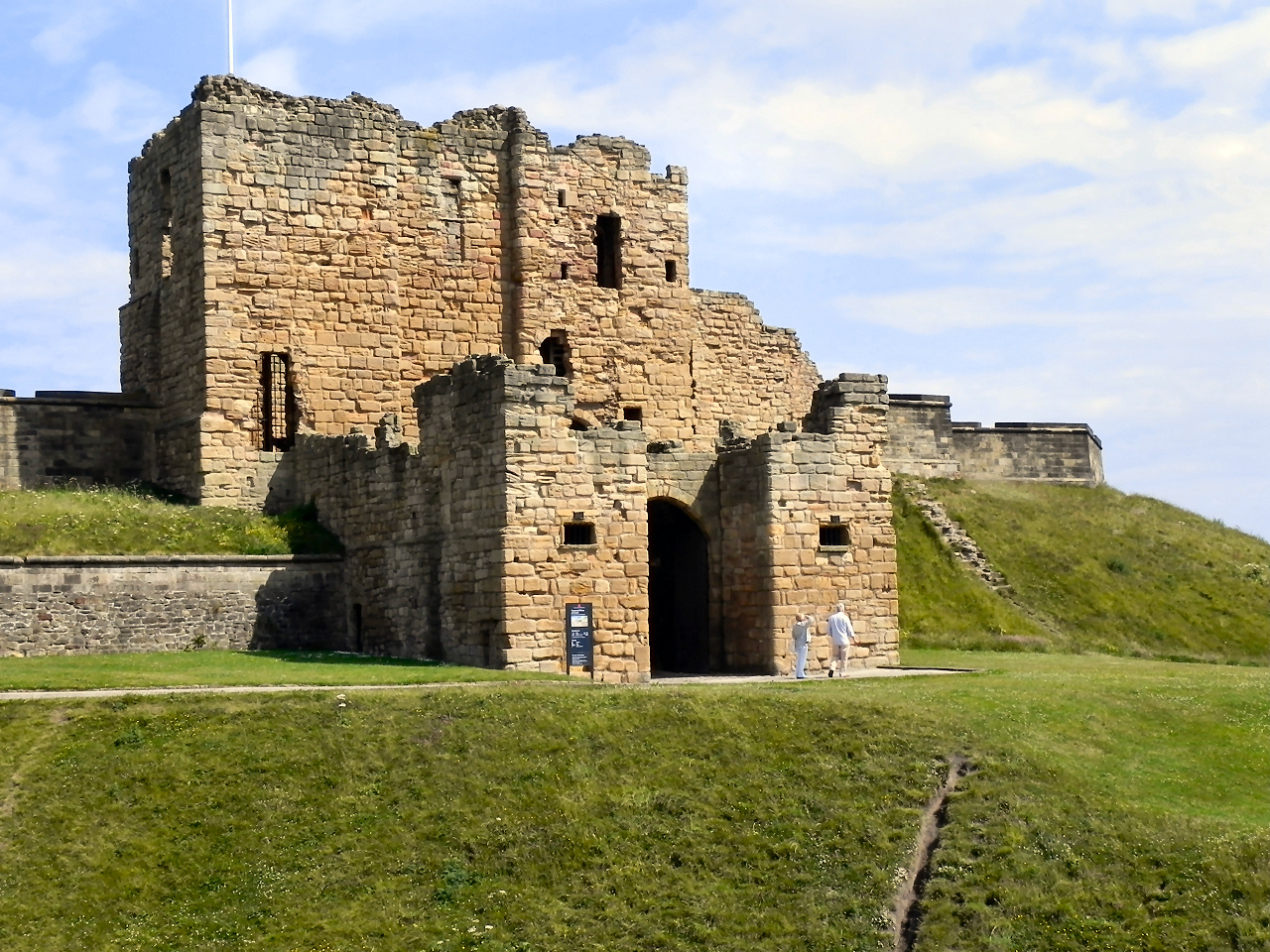
- The remains of Tynemouth Castle

Site information
- Type: Gatehouse
- Owner: English Heritage
- Open to the public: Yes
- Condition: Ruined

Site history
- Built: 13th–14th century
- Materials: Sandstone
- Events: First War of Scottish Independence, English Civil War

In 1095 Robert de Mowbray revolted against William II. When the Earl's stronghold, Bamburgh Castle, was besieged by the king he and 30 followers took refuge in Tynemouth where they held out for six days before being captured, suggesting the monastery was defended in some way, perhaps by a motte-and-bailey castle.

When Edward I invaded Scotland in 1296, the prior received royal licence to crenellate the monastery. Curtain walls were erected atop an earth embankment which spans the neck of the promontory and may date back to the Norman defences or the late Iron Age settlement. The walls once encircled the entire monastery and were further fortified by Whitley Tower overlooking King Edward's Bay and East Mount Tower towards Prior's Haven. The stone walls were an extension of the monastery's defences which had already existed as early as the reign of Henry II.

In 1312, Edward II took refuge in Tynemouth Castle together with his unpopular favourite Piers Gaveston, before fleeing by sea to Scarborough Castle despite the pleas of his wife, Isabella.

After his victory at the Battle of Bannockburn in 1314, Robert the Bruce attacked Tynemouth but the castle was successfully defended by a garrison of 80 men-at-arms. In 1318, the king appointed a custodian of priory fortifications. In February 1390, Richard II, John of Gaunt, and Henry Percy, Earl of Northumberland, all paid large sums of money towards Tynemouth's defences, and soon construction of a gatehouse began in the middle of the aforementioned embankment which was complete by the early 15th century.

The castle remained in royal hands following the suppression of the priory due to its strategic importance. New artillery fortifications were built from 1545 onwards, with the advice of Sir Richard Lee and the Italian military engineers Gian Tommaso Scala and Antonio da Bergamo. The medieval castle walls were updated with new gunports. The castle was the birthplace of Henry Percy, 9th Earl of Northumberland in 1564, during the period when his father, the 8th Earl, was guardian of the castle.

In May 1594, George Selby and Thomas Power, lieutenant of Tynemouth Castle, captured two fugitives from the court of Anne of Denmark who had stolen some of her jewels. Power kept Jacob Kroger, a German goldsmith, and Guillaume Martyn, a French stableman, as prisoners at Tynemouth for five weeks until they were returned to Edinburgh for summary trial and execution.

William Selby became keeper of Tynemouth Castle in December 1606, succeeding Sir Henry Widdrington. An inventory was made of the artillery at the castle. Some muskets and halberds in the great chamber and armoury were claimed for the Earl of Northumberland. Selby wrote that the house or lodging was uninhabitable and the guns were not mounted. His duties involved keeping a light for shipping.

== Subsequent history ==
=== Lighthouse ===
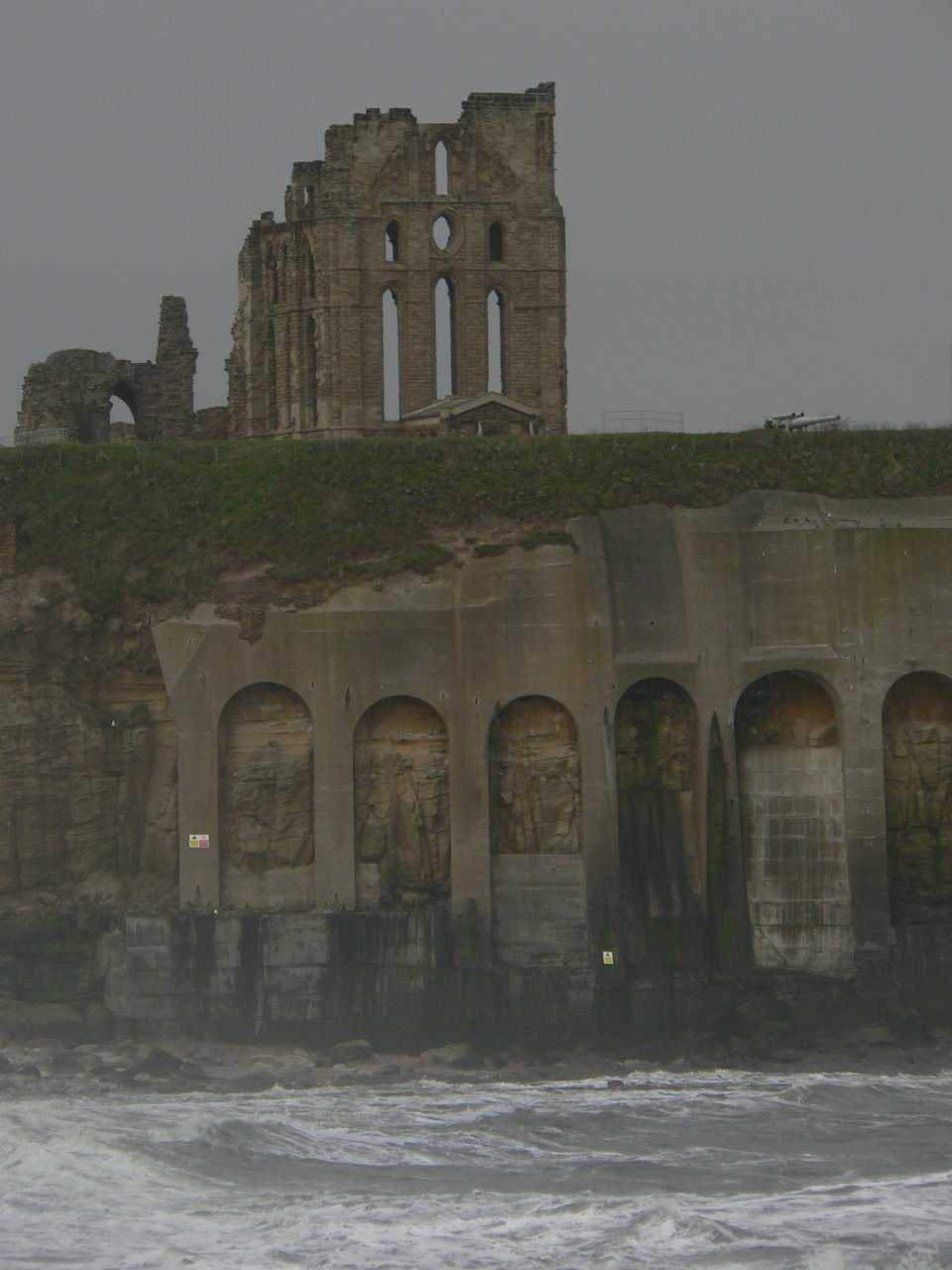
Tynemouth Priory viewed from Tynemouth pier shows the strategic and dramatic nature of its headland setting

For some time a navigation light, in the form of a coal-fired brazier, had been maintained on top of one of the turrets at the east end of the Priory church. It is not known when this practice began, but a source of 1582 refers to: "the kepinge of a continuall light in the night season at the easte ende of the churche of Tinmouthe castle ... for the more safegarde of such shippes as should passe by that coast". As Governor of Tynemouth Castle, Henry Percy, 8th Earl of Northumberland is recorded as having responsibility for the light's maintenance; and he and his successors in that office were entitled to receive dues from passing ships in return.

Tinmouth Castle Lighthouse Act 1802
- Act of Parliament
- Parliament of the United Kingdom
- Long title: An Act for improving the Tinmouth Castle Light House and Light; and for authorizing additional Light Duties in respect of such Improvement.
- Citation: 42 Geo. 3. c. xliii

Dates
- Royal assent: 4 May 1802

Text of statute as originally enacted

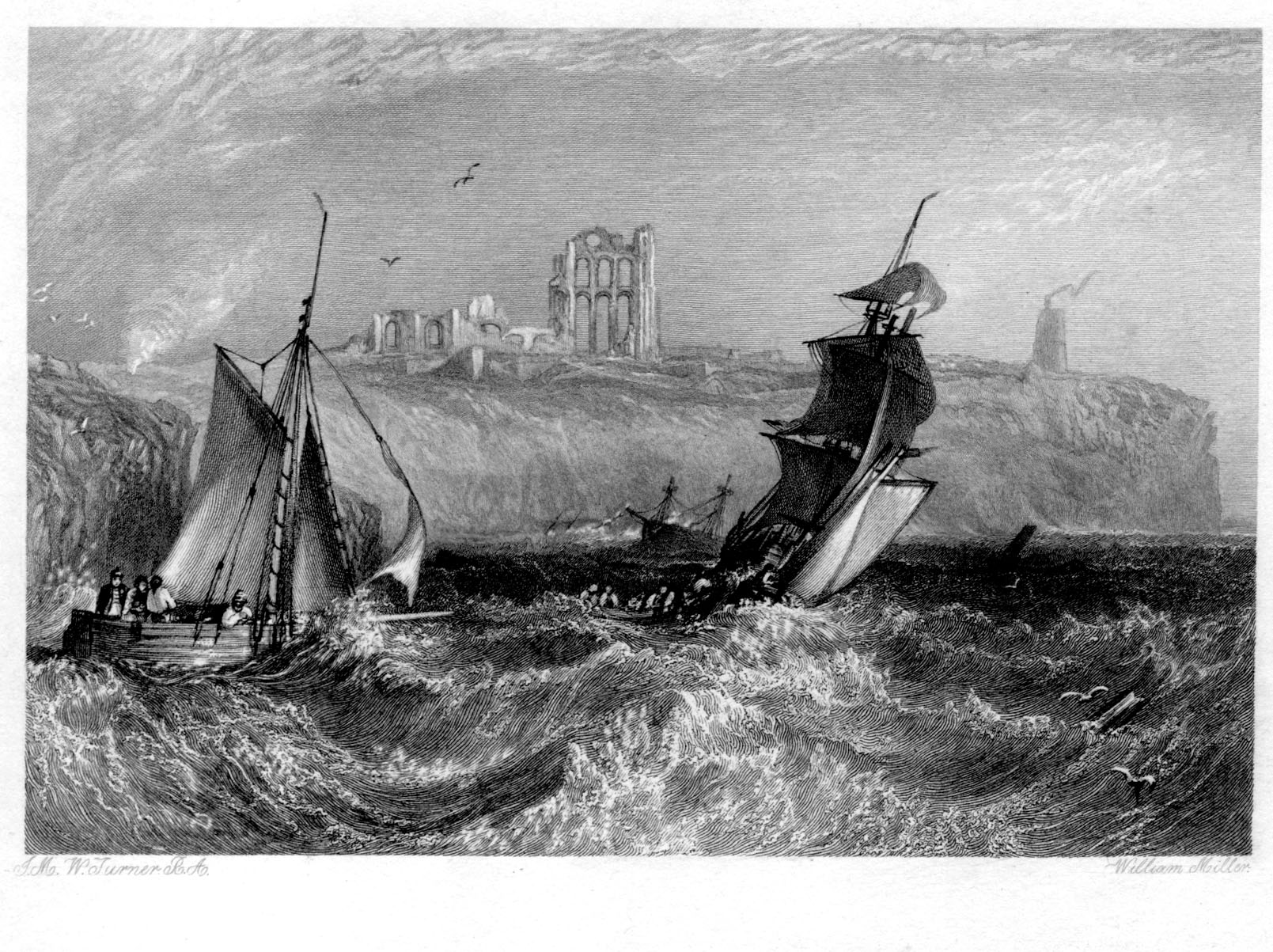
Tynemouth priory, 1867 proof engraving by William Miller after J. M. W. Turner. The lighthouse, since demolished, stands on the far right of the promontory.

However, the stairs leading to the top of the turret collapsed in 1559, preventing the fire from being lit. In 1665, the Governor of Tynemouth Castle, Colonel Villiers, had a lighthouse erected on the headland using stone taken from the priory; it was rebuilt in 1775. Like its predecessor, the lighthouse was initially coal-fired, but under the Tinmouth Castle Lighthouse Act 1802 (42 Geo. 3. c. xliii) an oil-fired argand light was installed. In 1841, Governor William Fowke sold the lighthouse to Trinity House, London. On the establishment of a lighthouse at Souter Point in 1871, the Tynemouth light was altered to display a revolving red light rather than revolving white. It remained in operation until 1898, when it was replaced by St. Mary's Lighthouse in Whitley Bay to the north; Tynemouth Castle Lighthouse was then demolished.

=== Coastal defence and coastguard station ===
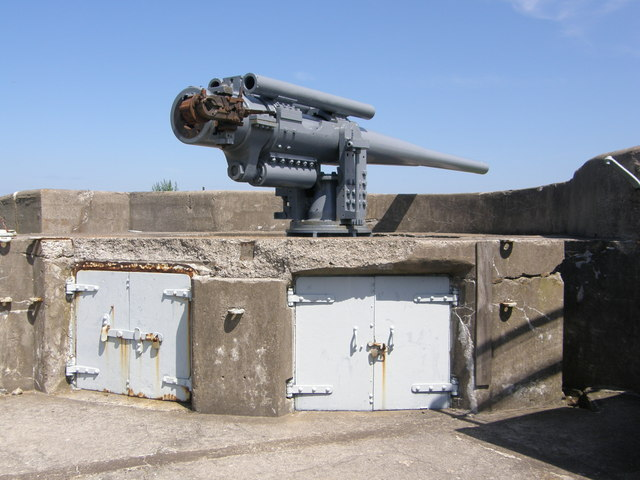
Gun emplacement within the Priory precinct. This BL 6-inch Mk XXIII naval gun is a modern installation to represent an earlier Mk VII gun.

At the end of the 19th century, the castle was used as a barracks with several new buildings being added.

In 1930, the castle was taken over by the Office of Works following a fire and many of the modern additions were removed. The castle played an important role during World War II when it was used as a coastal defence installation covering the mouth of the river Tyne. It also suffered heavy air raids in 1941. Military structures remained in place until 1956 when the army departed. The restored sections of the coastal defence emplacements are open to the public. These include a guardroom and the main armoury, where visitors can see how munitions were safely handled and protected.

More recently, the site has hosted the modern buildings of Her Majesty's Coastguard; however the new coastguard station, built in 1980 and opened by Prince Charles, was closed in 2001.

=== Present day ===
The gatehouse is the only building of the medieval defences to have survived intact. The surviving sections of the priory, including the east end wall and lancet windows, are examples of early Gothic architecture. The later Percy chapel remains completely intact. Much remains of the walls which are 3200 feet (975 m) in length. The promontory was originally completely enclosed by a curtain wall and towers, but the north and east walls fell into the sea, and most of the south wall was demolished; the west wall and a section of the south wall (with original wall walk) remain in good condition. Of the modern military structures, only the Warrant Officer's house and gun emplacements remain.

Tynemouth Castle and Priory is now managed by English Heritage, which charges an admission fee.

== Gallery ==
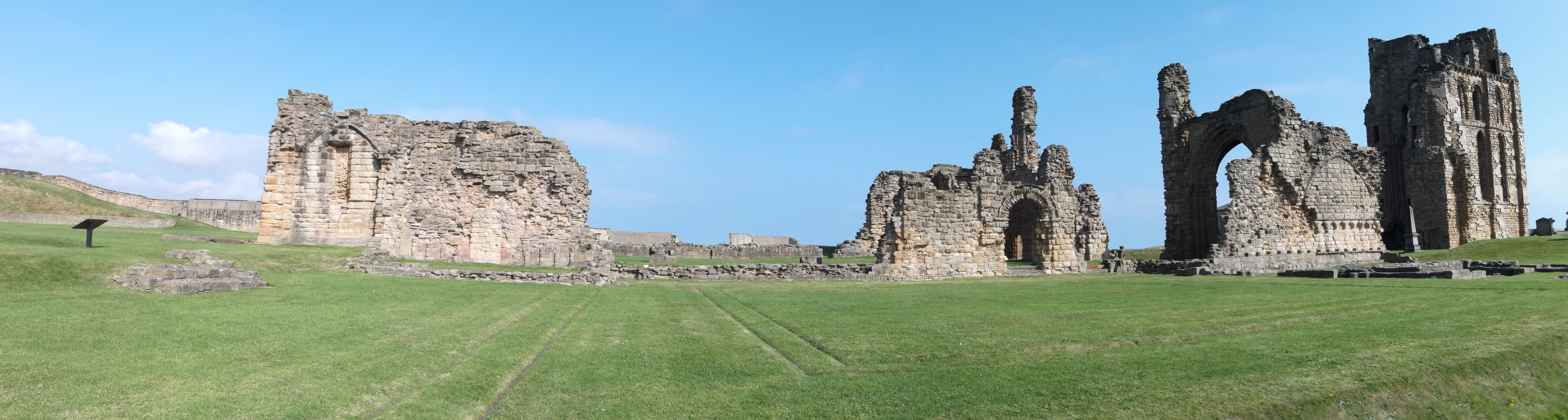
Panorama of the remains of Tynemouth Priory
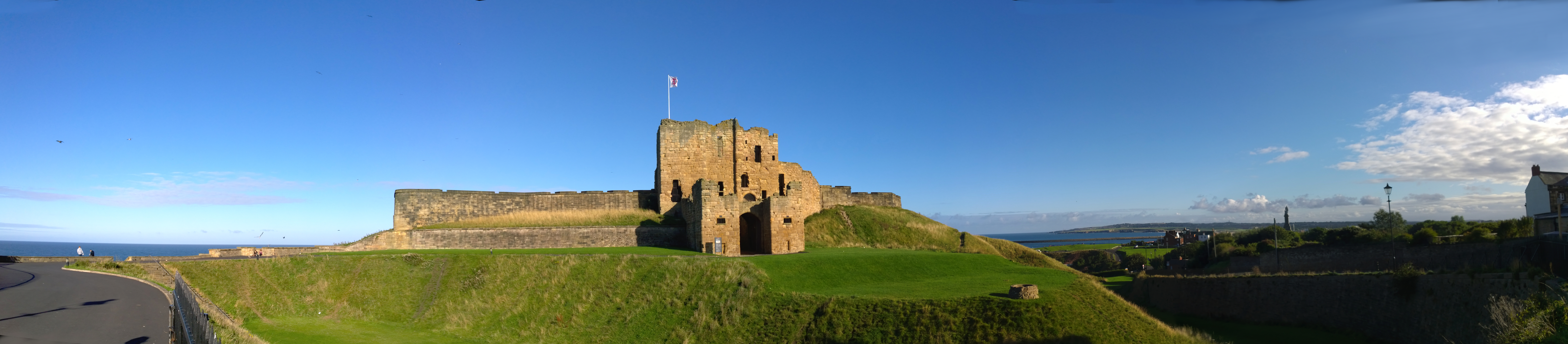
Tynemouth Castle

== See also ==
- List of monastic houses in England
- List of castles in England
- Our Lady and St Oswin's Church, Tynemouth

== Sources ==
- Beckensall, Stan (2001). Northumberland. The Power of Place. Stroud, Gloucestershire: Tempus Publishing Ltd. ISBN 0 7524 1907 2.
- Grundy, John (2022). History of Northumberland. Newcastle upon Tyne: Tyne Bridge Publishing. ISBN 9781838280970.
