= North Shields =

Town in Tyne and Wear, England

Coordinates: 55.0097°N 1.4448°W

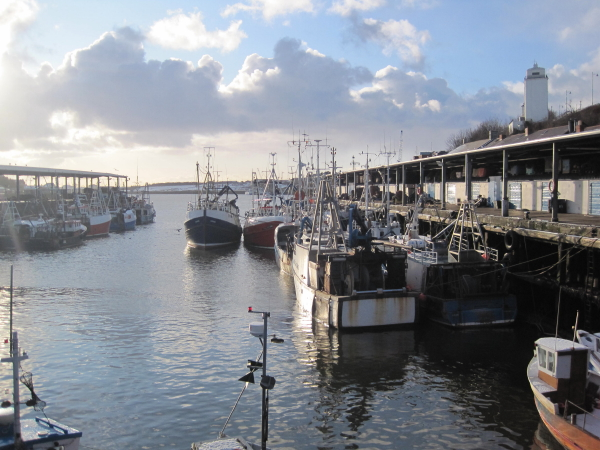
- North Shields Fish Quay

- Location within Tyne and Wear
- Population: 6,137
- OS grid reference: NZ3568
- Metropolitan borough: North Tyneside
- Metropolitan county: Tyne and Wear
- Region: North East
- Country: England
- Sovereign state: United Kingdom
- Post town: NORTH SHIELDS
- Postcode district: NE29, NE30
- Dialling code: 0191
- Police: Northumbria
- Fire: Tyne and Wear
- Ambulance: North East
- UK Parliament: Tynemouth

North Shields (/ʃiːlz/ SHEELZ) is a town in the borough of North Tyneside in Tyne and Wear, England. It is 8 miles (13 km) north-east of Newcastle upon Tyne and borders nearby Wallsend and Tynemouth. The population of North Shields at the 2021 census was 6,137.

Since 1974, it has been in the North Tyneside borough of Tyne and Wear: its historic administration was as part of the Castle ward in county of Northumberland. It was part of the Tynemouth County Borough; when abolished in 1974, the borough became an unparished area.

It is on the northern bank of the River Tyne, opposite to South Shields on the other bank. The name derives from Middle English schele meaning "temporary sheds or huts used by fishermen".

== History ==
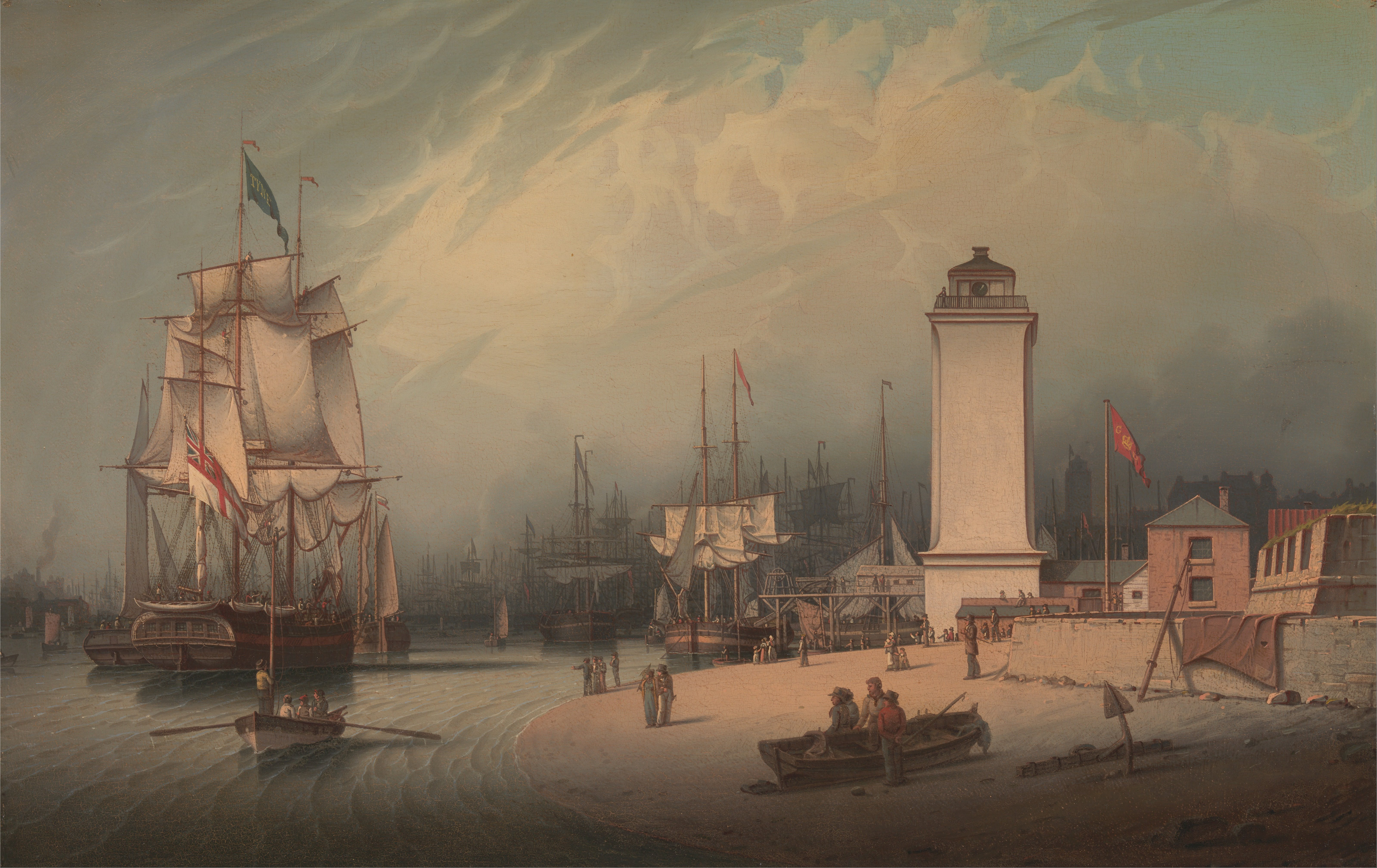
North Shields 1828 (by Robert Salmon). From left-right: Shipping on the Tyne, New Low Light, Old Low Light, Clifford's Fort.

=== Earliest records ===
North Shields is first recorded in 1225, when the Prior of Tynemouth, Germanus, decided to create a fishing port to provide fish for the Priory which was situated on the headland at the mouth of the River Tyne. He also supplied ships anchored near the priory. A number of rudimentary houses or 'shiels' were erected at the mouth of the Pow Burn where the stream enters the Tyne, as well as wooden quays which were used to unload the fishing boats. The quays were also used to ship coal from local collieries owned by the Priory. Soon the population of the new township numbered 1,000. The burgesses of Newcastle upon Tyne were determined to preserve the custom rights that they had enjoyed up till then, which covered the whole length of the river. They successfully petitioned the king in 1290 and managed to suspend trade from the new settlement. It was forbidden to victual ships or to load and unload cargoes at North Shields. The opposition of the Newcastle burgesses remained for a considerable time but despite this, North Shields continued to develop as a centre for fishing and exporting salt, produced at local saltpans. For a considerable period the Newcastle burgesses, known as the Hostmen, who controlled the export of coal from the Tyne, resisted the export of this commodity from North Shields.

=== Geographic development ===
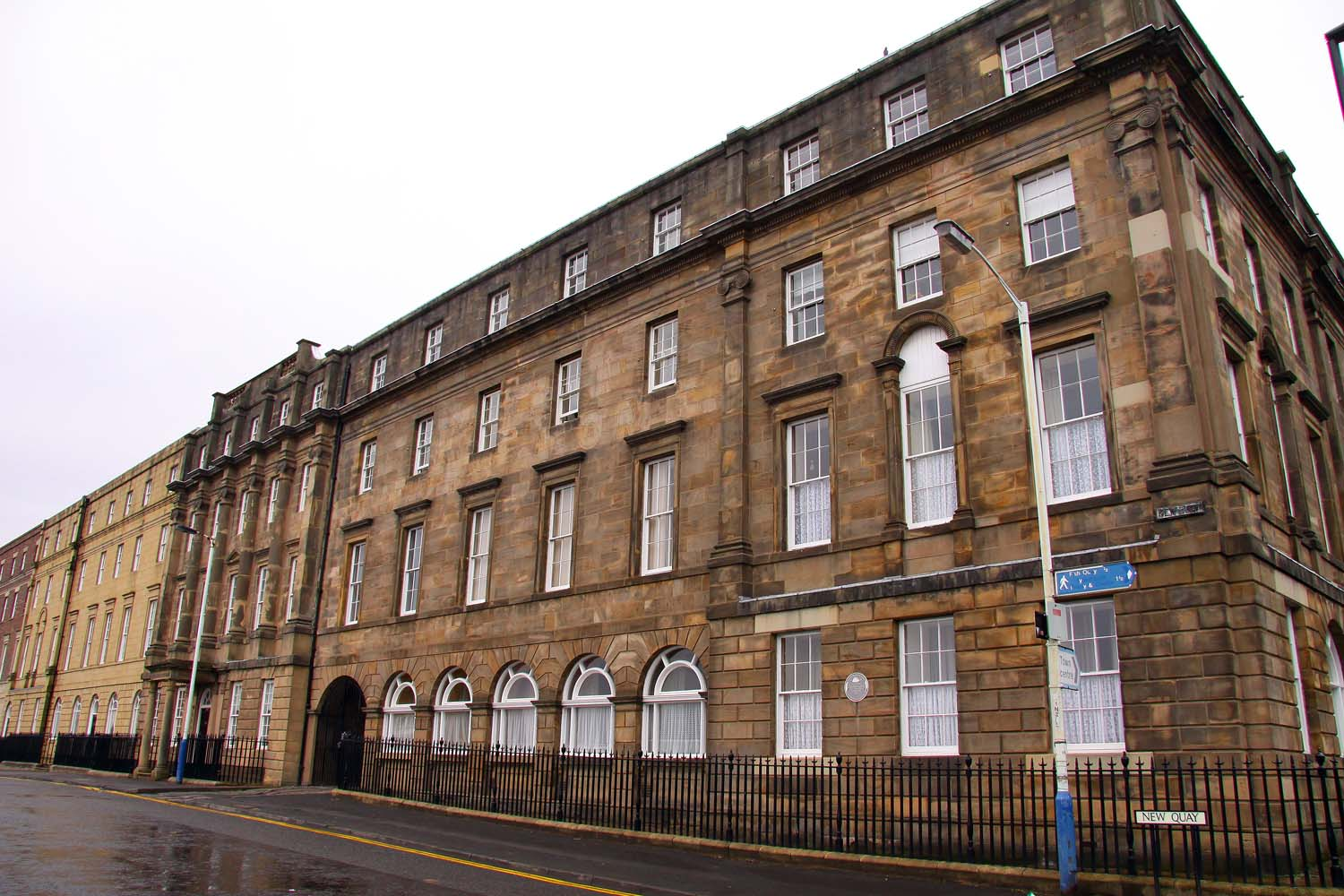
New Quay, part of a riverside development built by the Duke of Northumberland in 1806

The town was originated on a narrow strip of land alongside the river (around the present-day Clive Street) because of the steep bank which hemmed it in. Eventually becoming overcrowded, in the 18th century buildings began to be erected on the plateau 60 feet (20 m) above the old unsanitary dwellings alongside the river. Prosperous businessmen and shipowners occupied the new town whereas working people remained in the lower part of town. The low, riverside part of the town was linked to the newer, higher part of the town by a series of stairs. These stairs were initially surrounded by slum dwellings, and although the houses have since been cleared the stairs remain.

One of the first developments of the new town was Dockwray Square, built in 1763, a set of elegant town houses that was populated by wealthy families. Due to the poor provision of water and drainage facilities, however, the wealthy families soon moved to the more central part of the new town, and particularly the new Northumberland Square. Dockwray Square eventually deteriorated into slums. In the early twentieth century Stan Laurel lived at a house in Dockwray Square for a few years, before he became famous. The square has since been re-developed, initially in the 1960s, and again in the 1990s. A statue of Laurel stands in the middle to commemorate his stay there.

The land on which the new town was built was largely owned by the Earl of Carlisle. In 1796, John Wright produced plans that included a grand processional way, now Howard Street, leading to the Georgian Northumberland Square. A railway tunnel, built in the 1840s, left the west and south sides of the square largely unfinished, until a 1960s library building was constructed, somewhat out of keeping with the rest of the architecture. In 1844–45, John Dobson built the town hall, on the corner of Howard and Saville Streets.

== Geography ==
The town is bounded to the north by Whitley Bay and to the south by the River Tyne. The town of Tynemouth is to its east and the A19 road marks the boundary between North Shields and Wallsend to the west of the town. It is part of the North Tyneside conurbation.

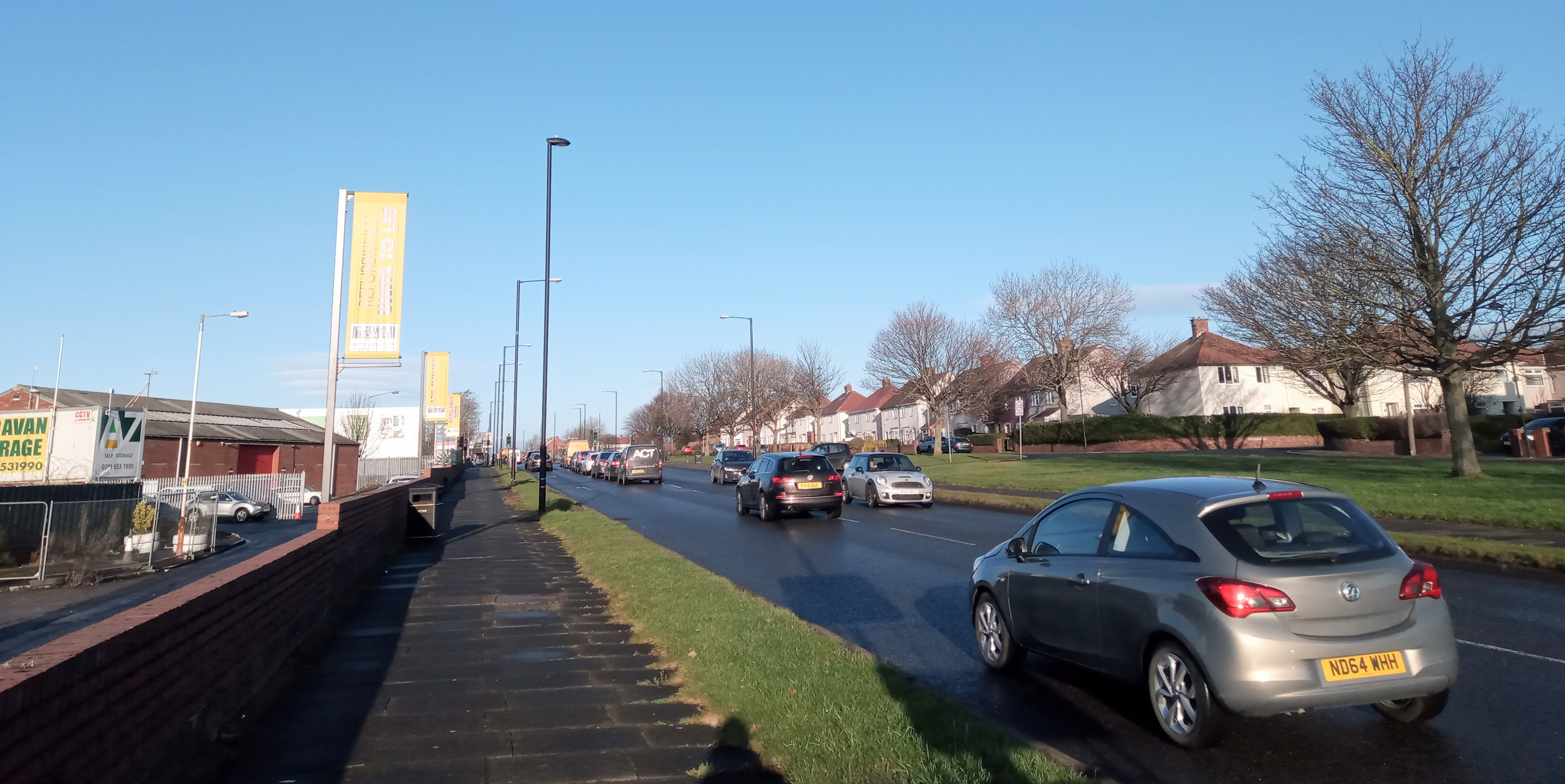
Norham Road, North Shields, Tyne and Wear

Over the years, North Shields has grown from a small fishing village to incorporate the nearby areas of Chirton, Preston, Billy Mill, Percy Main, East Howdon and Marden estate.

The 2011 definition of the town of Tynemouth includes North Shields, which means a population figure can only be given as a combination of wards rather than as a USD.

=== Town Centre ===
In September 2020, the North Tyneside Council published prospective plans for regeneration of the town centre, which include developing a distinctive route to the Fish Quay, pedestrianisation of key streets, consolidation of retail units, creation of a town square, renovation of Northumberland Square and the establishment of a transport hub. At the time of publication, the plan was not financed and the council sought the views of local residents and business owners.

In summer 2020, work was being completed on the refurbishment of the terraced row to the north of Northumberland Square, as well as the development of a newly built row of homes on nearby Albion Road. The newly restored Wooden Dolly was also returned to the Square.

A new square, adjacent to Bedford Street, was completed as part of the Transport Hub development in September 2023. Bedford Street itself was fully pedestrianised, repaved, and had new seating and planting installed in 2025.

=== Meadow Well ===
A large council estate, Meadow Well (alternatively spelt Meadowell or Meadowwell on local signs) to the west of the town, was constructed in the 1930s to house residents displaced by the clearance of the Dockwray Square and Low Town slum areas. These flats were replaced with better quality homes in the 1960s and 70s. Meadow Well was formerly known as the Ridges Estate – a name occasionally used today – since it was built on the site of the Ridges farm. Its present name is derived from a well situated in a meadow upon which the estate was built.

On Monday, 9 September 1991, Meadow Well was featured heavily in the news across the UK as riots broke out; these riots continued for three days. Many properties were damaged, cars burned out and the local community centre burned down. As a result of the riots, the local housing was gradually improved by the council over the next three years through demolition and rebuilding, as well as renovation. A number of community development organisations, including the Cedarwood Trust, Meadow Well Connected and the Phoenix Detached Youth Project, have worked in the area for many years.

The film Dream On (1991) is set on the estate.

Following the Meadow Well riots, in July 1992 the Government granted £37.5 million over five years to regenerate that area of the town, as part of the City Challenge scheme.

=== Royal Quays ===
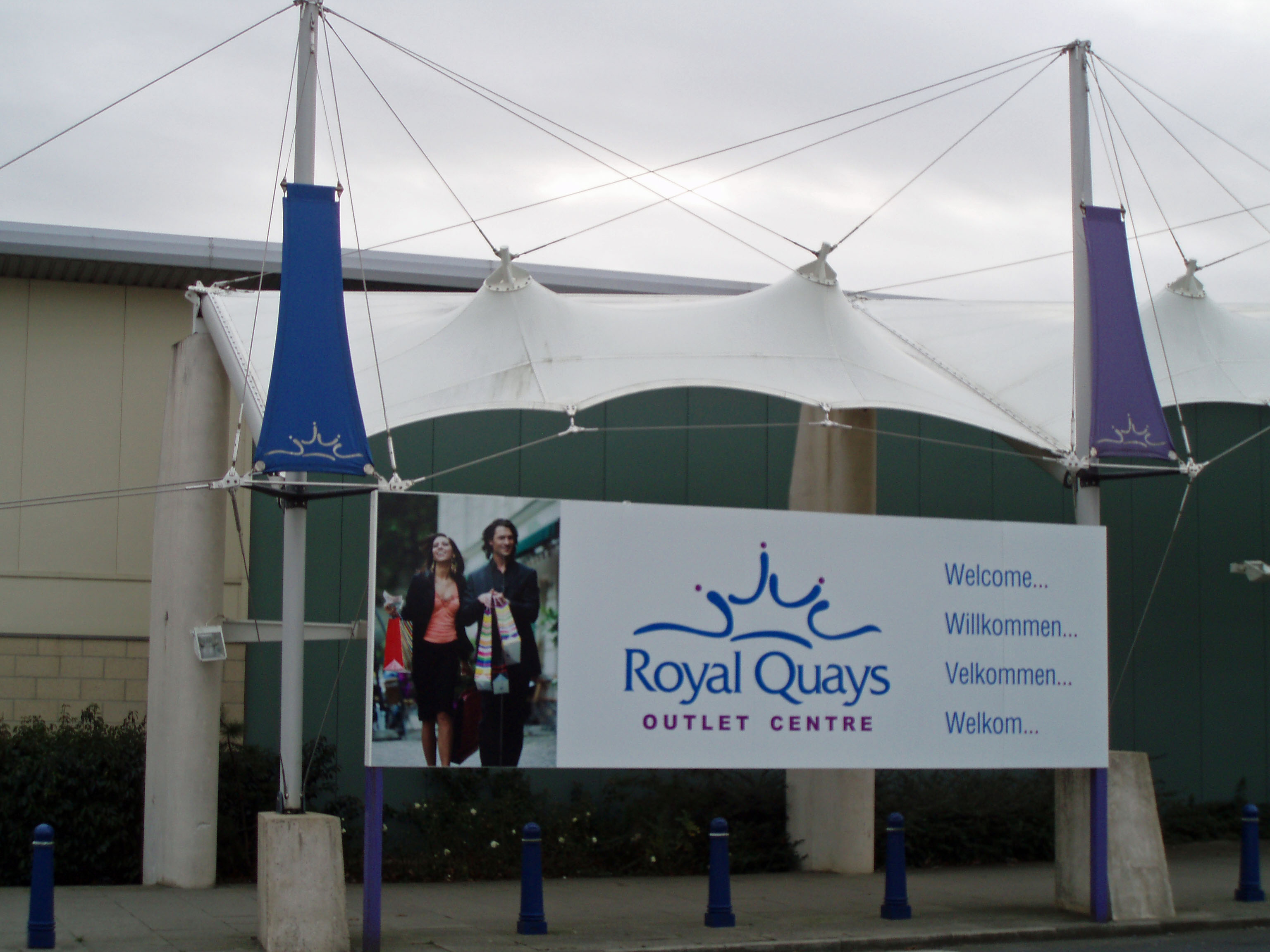
Royal Quays Retail Park, an outlet shopping centre located at North Shields

An extensive regeneration programme costing £16 million saw the revitalisation of the redundant Albert Edward docks. Across an 80-hectare area, the former Tyne and Wear Development Corporation partnered with North Tyneside Council and the private sector to provide a mix of housing, leisure facilities, office space and industrial sites. The Wet N Wild indoor water park, an outlet shopping centre, a bowling alley, a soccer dome and a marina formed the centrepiece to the Royal Quays development to the west of the town.

Mark di Suvero's Tyne Anew (1999), his only large-scale public artwork in the UK, can be seen at Albert Edward Dock.

The shopping centre was rebranded by new owners as the Newcastle Quays Retail in early 2024. The centre had declined over a number of years prior to the former owner being placed into administration in 2023.

=== Fish Quay ===
Similarly, major regeneration of the Fish Quay, on the riverside to the south-east of the town centre, has included the construction of luxury apartments and the conversion of existing buildings into restaurants and bars alongside the working quay. In November 2018, North Tyneside Council announced plans for further development to enhance the area as a food and drink destination.

=== Smith's Docks ===
The site of the former Smith's Docks was acquired by the developer Places For People in 2007. In January 2015 they sought planning permission for the construction of homes on the site. The first of those homes, including some designed by George Clarke, was sold in 2017 and as of April 2018, work continues on the site. The second phase, the Smokehouses, was completed in autumn 2018.

=== Heritage Action Zone ===
Having been awarded £900,000 through the High Street Heritage Action Zone programme, North Tyneside Council added £1 million additional funding to revive the conservation area around Howard Street and Northumberland Square. It also saw work completed on the streetscape connecting to the main shopping thoroughfare of Bedford Street in order to better link the areas and decrease the dominance of motor vehicles.

=== Collingwood Grange ===
In 2017, North Tyneside Council granted planning permission for up to 400 new homes on formerly industrial land to the west of Norham Road. In April 2020, the developer, Miller Homes, announced that work had been halted by the COVID-19 pandemic and that plans may be altered as a result. Work on the development recommenced in January 2021.

== Industry ==
=== Former ===
In 1887, the town's businesses were listed as a marine engine, chain cable and anchor manufacturer, shipbuilding yards, roperies, salt-works, and an earthenware and stained glass manufacturer. Fishing was also a major industry of employment. The Smith's Dock Company was another major employer for many years, eventually closing in 1987.

==== Shipyards ====
Shipyards have been in existence in North Shields since near its founding. The smaller yards built the Northumbrian coble, a small inshore fishing vessel with a lug sail, well known in the North East. Larger yards built wooden sailing collier brigs, used to transport local coal to London. Eventually these small yards were replaced by larger yards such as the Tyne Dock and Engineering Company and the Smith's Dock Company. These yards produced iron vessels for various uses, including fishing and the coal trade. In later years the North Shields yards were used for ship repair work, with Smith's dock surviving until the 1990s. None of these yards remain.

==== Oil terminal ====
Esso formerly had an oil terminal on the banks of the Tyne, off Howdon Road. In April 1994, a bomb planted by the IRA exploded tearing a 3-foot square hole in one of the tanks. A second device, which did not detonate, was later found nearby. Six hundred gallons of crude oil leaked from the tank, but was caught in a channel designed to prevent leakages. A second explosion occurred in June 1994, perpetrated by the same bombers.

=== Maritime ===
With its fishing industry and shipbuilding history, a number of maritime related companies remain in the town. John Lilley and Gillie Ltd, a marine equipment manufacturer is headquartered there.

=== Mining ===
Collieries in the town were located at three of the outlying villages since incorporated into the town, at Preston, at the location of the present cemetery gates, Percy Main and New York.

=== Office and business parks ===
Following the demise of coal mining and shipbuilding in the area, several business parks, industrial estates and trading estates were established providing alternative employment. The biggest of these are The Silverlink and Cobalt Park, the UK's largest office park. Atmel had a plant located at Silverlink, previously occupied by Siemens but the plant is now demolished apart from the office building, now home to Cobalt Business Exchange. Cobalt is home to an EE mobile call centre. The town's association with the early days of the railways is recognised at the Stephenson Railway Museum on Middle Engine Lane near The Silverlink.

=== Other industries ===
Potts Print, based in Cramlington since 2006, was originally founded in North Shields in 1875. They occupied various sites in the town over the years.

Spicers has a large factory in the town, producing tea. It bought the site from Twinings in 2012.

Donald Campbell's Bluebird K7, which crashed during a water speed record attempt on Coniston Water, was restored in a workshop in the town by local engineer Bill Smith.

== Transport ==
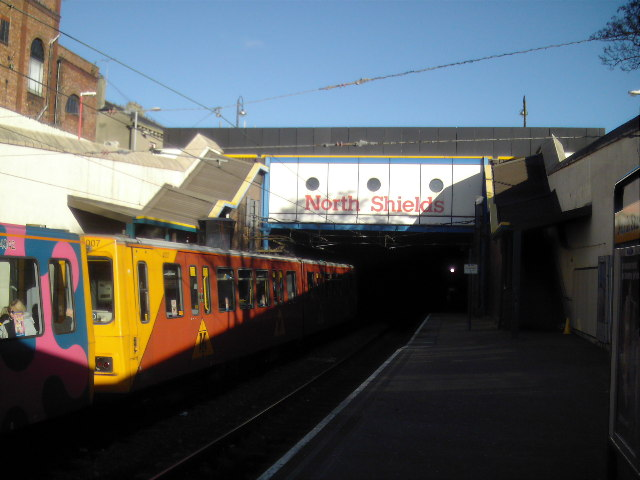
North Shields Metro Station

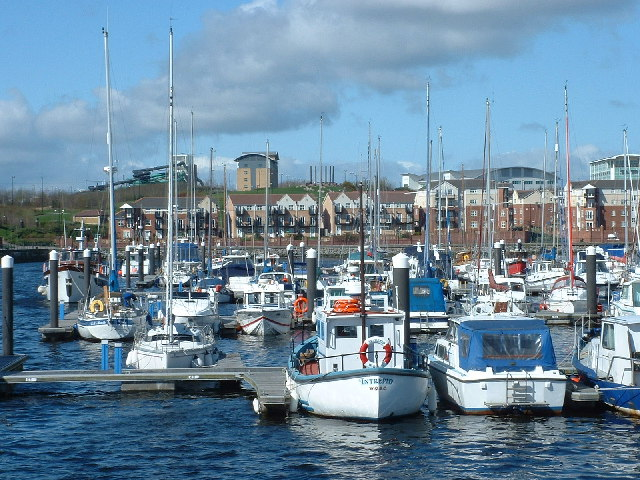
Royal Quays Marina

=== Rail (Tyne and Wear Metro) ===
The Newcastle and North Shields Railway opened in 1839. In 1847, the railway was extended to Tynemouth when a railway station was built in Oxford Street, off Tynemouth Road. Eventually, it was replaced by a new station further away from the river after new rail lines were developed. The riverside tracks were removed for the creation of Hadrian's Way, part of the national cycle network, but the remaining tracks were absorbed in the Tyne and Wear Metro system in 1982. The town centre station, originally constructed for the Newcastle and North Shields Railway, was redeveloped between 1980 and 1982 for the Metro. It was subsequently refurbished in 2012. The Tyne and Wear Metro links North Shields to Newcastle city centre, and to other destinations in Tyne and Wear including Whitley Bay, Newcastle Airport and Sunderland. The town is also served by stations in Percy Main and Meadow Well.

The Tyneside Tramways and Tramroads Company also operated an electric tramway service in the town.

=== Shipping ===
==== Local ferry ====
A half-hourly ferry service connects North Shields to the town of South Shields on the opposite bank of the Tyne. The present Shields Ferry was established in 1972. Its first female skipper was appointed in 2016. Shieldsman, a former ferry retired in 2007, has since been moved to Shoreham, West Sussex, and transformed into a houseboat.

From June to October, river trips by ferry operate.

In November 2018, the local council announced plans to consider the feasibility of moving the ferry landing. In July 2021 it was announced that the planned relocation was delayed until 2023.

==== International ferry ====
From the International Ferry Terminal, based at Royal Quays, the Danish company DFDS Seaways operates a daily service to IJmuiden.

The ferry service to Gothenburg, Sweden (run by DFDS Seaways), ceased operation at the end of October 2006. DFDS Seaways' sister company, DFDS Tor Line, continues to run scheduled freight ships between Gothenburg and several English ports, including Newcastle, but these have limited capacity for passengers and do not carry private vehicles.

==== Port of Tyne International Passenger Terminal ====
The passenger terminal regularly welcomes tourists travelling on cruises that call at North Shields as an access point for Newcastle upon Tyne and the wider North East of England. In 2017, 52 ships docked, bringing 120,000 visitors to the region. A number of "dudes" - red and blue powder coated figures designed by artist Perminder Kaur - can be seen on a grassy mound at the entrance to the terminal.

=== Buses ===
A transport interchange, adjacent to the Metro station, opened in September 2023. It was the first council building in the borough to be fully carbon-neutral in its construction and operation.

== Education ==
The town's schools are part of a three-tiered system:

- Nursery schools
  - Sir James Knott Nursery School
- Primary schools
  - Christ Church Church of England Primary School
  - Collingwood Primary School
  - King Edward Primary School
  - Kings Priory School
  - Monkhouse Primary School
  - Percy Main Primary School
  - Preston Grange Primary School
  - Riverside Primary School
  - Spring Gardens Primary School
  - St Cuthberts Roman Catholic Primary School
  - St Josephs Roman Catholic Primary School
  - Waterville Primary School
  - Whitehouse Primary School
- High schools
  - John Spence Community High School, Preston
  - Kings Priory School, Tynemouth
  - Marden High School, Cullercoats
  - Norham High School, Chirton
  - St Thomas More RC Academy, Billy Mill

== Religion ==
North Shields has a number of churches and religious groups:

=== Christian churches ===
Denomination	Name	Location	Denominational Affiliation	Notes
Church of England	Christ Church	Preston Road	Tynemouth Deanery in the Diocese of Newcastle	Now the parish church of North Shields but originally consecrated as Tynemouth Parish Church on Sunday 5 July 1668 (enlarged 1792). Part of the North Shields Team Ministry, with St Augustin's.
Church of England	St Augustin's	Jackson Street	Tynemouth Deanery in the Diocese of Newcastle	Part of the North Shields Team Ministry with Christ Church. The building was designed by Robert Rowand Anderson, originally as a replica of St Andrew's Episcopalian Church in Fife, but ultimately modified during construction. The foundation was laid in 1881 and the church opened in 1884.
Church of England	St Peter's	Central Avenue, Balkwell	Tynemouth Deanery in the Diocese of Newcastle	The building was designed by North Shields architect William Stockdale and opened in 1937. As of 2019, the church shares a priest with St John's.
Church of England	The Church of the Holy Saviour	Crossway, Tynemouth	Tynemouth Deanery in the Diocese of Newcastle	The building was consecrated by the Bishop of Durham in 1841, as a chapel of ease to Christ Church. It was formally separated in 1861.
Church of England	St John's	St John's Terrace, Percy Main	Tynemouth Deanery in the Diocese of Newcastle	Shares a priest with St Peter's. Built in 1862, the building was reordered in 2000 to provide adaptable space for use as a community centre as well as for worship.
Church of England	St Aidan's	Billy Mill Lane, Billy Mill	Tynemouth Deanery in the Diocese of Newcastle	Dedicated in 1958. As of 2022, the church shares a priest with St Hilda's.
Church of England	St Hilda's	Stanton Road, Preston Gate	Tynemouth Deanery in the Diocese of Newcastle	Dedicated in 1966, it is a daughter church of St George's, Cullercoats. As of 2022, the church shares a priest with St Aidan's.
Roman Catholic Church	St Cuthbert's	Albion Road West	Roman Catholic Diocese of Hexham and Newcastle	The building, opened on 22 December 1975, replaced a much earlier church, over the road from the present site, which was itself completed around 1820. As of 2020, the church shares a priest with St Joseph's.
Roman Catholic Church	St Joseph's	Wallsend Road, Chirton	Roman Catholic Diocese of Hexham and Newcastle	The building was opened in 1955, replacing temporary buildings that had been erected in 1935 on the site of J. Ord's old market garden. As of 2020, the church shares a priest with St Cuthbert's.
United Reformed Church	St Columba's	Northumberland Square	Northern Synod	The building was designed by architect John Dobson.
Methodist Church	North Shields Methodist Church	Hawkey's Lane		The building was opened in 1932. Methodists in the town had previously met in a building that stills stands in Saville Street, as of 2020 housing Frank's flooring store but for many years a branch of Woolworths. After the Methodists' departure, the top floor of the building was removed before the store opened. A war memorial originally installed in the Saville Street building, and commemorating those who fought and died in World War One, was transferred to the Hawkey's Lane site. The present building was extended in 1997.
Baptist Union of Great Britain	Filipino International Church	Howard Street	Member Churches of the Northern Baptist Association	Meeting at North Shields Baptist Church's building.
Baptist Union of Great Britain	North Shields Baptist Church	Howard Street	Member Churches of the Northern Baptist Association	The church was established in 1798 and has met in a number of different buildings in the town. The present building was purpose-built, having been designed under the direction of Dobson. The interior, which was expanded into the adjoining terraced house at some point, was subsequently substantially refurbished in the late 1990s and again in 2012. In 1851, the church had 238 members, making it the second largest Baptist church in the North East. A decade later, that had risen to 300.
Baptist Union of Great Britain	Preston Grange Community Church	Preston Grange	Member Churches of the Northern Baptist Association	The church meets in the Preston Grange Community Centre. It was originally an outreach congregation of Whitley Bay Baptist Church, begun in 1998, before being established in its own right in 2011.
Salvation Army	North Shields Salvation Army Corps	Howard Street		The building was constructed in 1811 as the Scotch Church and was also designed by John Dobson.
Non-denominational	North Shields Evangelical Church	George Street	Member of the Fellowship of Independent Evangelical Churches	Formed in the early 1980s by the joining together of The Evangelistic Mission and The People's Mission, two former free churches in the town, and initially known as The People's Evangelistic Mission.

Many are members of the ecumenical Churches Together in North Shields, itself a member of Churches Together in England.

==== Other organisations ====
- North Shields Fishermen's Mission, 42-47 Fish Quay - Based in North Shields, the organisation covers the North East coast from Amble to Redcar.
- The Cedarwood Trust, Avon Avenue - A Christian ethos community development organisation based in Meadow Well, initially established through a partnership of the Church of England and North Tyneside Council.

Both are associate members of Churches Together in North Shields.

=== Other religious groups ===
- The Church of Jesus Christ of Latter-day Saints, Malvern Road
- Iglesia ni Cristo, Stormont Street
- Kingdom Hall of Jehovah's Witnesses, Lower Norfolk Street
- North Shields Spiritualist Church, 42 Stanley Street West

== Economy ==
=== Culture ===
==== YMCA ====
YMCA North Tyneside was founded in 1870 and was originally known as The Borough of Tynemouth YMCA. After an inaugural meeting on 7 June 1879, weekly meetings followed in the Sons of Temperance Hall, Norfolk Street, North Shields. The YMCA grew in popularity. Within a year, larger premises were needed. Meetings moved to 53 Tyne Street, North Shields and in 1879 to Camden Street, North Shields. In 1920 the YMCA moved to a building in Bedford Street (which is still owned by the YMCA and now occupied by the Citizens Advice Bureau) where it remained until 1938, when it moved to the present building and the current registered office at Church Way, North Shields.

==== Fish Quay Festival ====
Between 1987 and 2001, a community festival was organised on the fish quay, during which the fleet of fishing boats would be blessed and various local talents would entertain the crowds. At its peak, the festival attracted 600,000 visitors. A smaller-scale family festival, in order to save costs, was held annually between 2002 and 2006, before it too was scrapped as a money-saving measure.

=== Retail ===
==== Town Centre ====
A significant part of the town centre is pedestrianised and it is dominated by the Beacon, a partly-covered shopping mall which was constructed in the late 1970s and originally named The Bedford Centre.

As with many British high streets, a number of large chains have closed their branches in the town in recent years. A number of discount retailers have branches in the town centre, as well as numerous charity stores. There are numerous independent butchers in the town centre, as well as a local independent bakery located nearby.

==== Other shopping centres ====
There are three further shopping centres in the town, as well as parades of shops in Balkwell, Preston and Chirton.

The Royal Quays Outlet Centre is home to a number of discount stores including outlets for Next, Clarks and Mountain Warehouse, as well as independent retailers such as a photographic studio and pet shop. The closures of a Marks & Spencer Outlet and, in late 2019, the Nike store have somewhat diminished the centre. In April 2023, it was reported that the centre's owners had appointed receivers who were advertising it for sale as a going concern. It remains open as usual.

The Silverlink Shopping Park, as of 2020. In September 2016, a large expansion of the retail park opened. Odeon also has a multi-screen cinema at the park, alongside restaurants.

=== Business ===
Over 100 businesses in the town are members of The North Shields Chamber of Trade and Commerce.

The Mercantile Building Society, established in the town and formerly headquartered at the Silverlink Business Park, merged with the Leeds Building Society in 2006.

== Recreation ==
In 2000, the local authority established more than 30 miles (48 km) of walking routes, primarily following the paths of 19th-century waggonways. A Tynemouth walk begins from the Metro station in the town centre and drops down on to the fish quay before following a route to Tynemouth, while the Royal Quays walk begins from the Meadowell Metro station and completes a route around the redeveloped riverside area including the marina, before ending at Percy Main Metro station.

=== Sport ===
The town is home to the non-League football club North Shields F.C. Founded in 1896, the team competes in Northern Football League and plays home games at Daren Persson Stadium (formerly Ralph Gardner Park). The team has twice played at Wembley Stadium, winning 2–1 on both occasions: against Sutton United on 12 April 1969 at the old Wembley to win the FA Amateur Cup and against Glossop North End at the new stadium on 9 May 2015 to win the FA Vase, the Amateur Cup's successor. The stadium is presently named as such because of a sponsorship by a local funeral director.

=== Leisure facilities ===
The Parks Sports Centre was opened in 1998, after the construction of the Royal Quays. It has a large sports hall, gym, multi-sensory room, outdoor football pitches, indoor and outdoor bowls facilities and a cafe.

==== Royal Quays facilities ====
The Wet'n'Wild indoor water park was constructed in 1992 and opened in summer 1993 as part of the Royal Quays development. It was originally designed with rides: six speed slides, five conventional flumes and one "lazy river" ride. The "Twister", a speed slide, was 85 metres (279 ft) long, and started from a height of 12.5 metres (41 ft). It closed in 2013 after its owner entered administration, but was reopened in 2014, having been bought by another company. In 2020, the owner announced that it would not reopen after the winter, citing financial losses due to poor visitor numbers. It was demolished in 2025, with the site cleared for redevelopment.

A bowling alley, originally Star Bowl, also forms part of the development. In 2019, having been closed for some time, it was reopened as Gutterball.

A trampoline park, Xtreme Bounce, was opened in 2017 in an air-locked dome in the outlet centre's car park. In 2019, the Inflatanation chain took over the site and reopened the venue with inflatables replacing the trampolines.

In 2019, a leisure hub housed in the health and fitness section of the former JJB Soccerdome adjacent to the outlet centre, was announced. Everyone Entertained was to feature climbing walls, soft play, laser tag and adventure golf, and employ 100 people. As of May 2020, the venue remains unopened. The pitches and bar were reopened as The Evolution Football Centre in autumn 2018. In early 2020, it was announced that the centre was to close having proved financially nonviable, with its demolition later announced in 2024.

==== Parks ====
There are a number of parks and play areas in the town.

===== Northumberland Park =====
Northumberland Park lies on the border of North Shields and Tynemouth and was set out around 1885, in an area formerly known as Spittal Dene. In 2015, North Tyneside Council completed a major project to revive and restore parts of the park. The multi-million pound scheme saw archaeological investigations carried out around the medieval St Leonard's Hospital and the restoration of historical features that had been lost over the years. Iron railings, park furniture, fountains were installed amid historic planting schemes. A pavilion housing a cafe and toilet facilities as well as offices and storage for the park staff was also opened.

There is a children's play area at the south end of the park, bowling greens on the western border and a historical pet cemetery to the north. A number of trees along a pathway in the northern half feature plaques commemorating their planting by various local dignitaries.

===== West End Park and Linear Park, Chirton Dene =====
West End Park lies adjacent to The Parks sports centre and was laid out prior to the 1940s. To its south, Linear Park runs down to the Royal Quays Marina and was created as part of the Royal Quays development in the mid-1990s.

===== Redburn Dene =====
As with Linear Park, Redburn Dene was created as part of the 1990s redevelopment of former industrial and dockland areas, following a natural water course. It features sculptures made from reclaimed staithes. The park was given a Green Flag award in 2020.

===== Play areas =====
Pearson Park located to the east of the town centre was laid in 2000, as a millennium project. Alexander Scott Park is to the east of the town centre. The Holmlands playsite lies within Haswell Gardens, an estate developed on the site of the former Preston Hospital. A further playsite and multi-use games area (MUGA) are adjacent to Norham High School. In Percy Main, a playground lies just off Nelson Terrace. East Howdon has a playsite and MUGA too. There is a playground adjacent to Tynemouth Pool. Finally, there is a further playsite on Tynemouth's sea front.

=== Library ===
The town's main library is in Northumberland Square. It originally included a lecture hall, which was expected to be used for musical performances too. Construction began in 1973, and the building is mounted on rubber springs to minimise noise and vibration from the Metro tunnel underneath. It was the first building to use PTFE to reduce weight drag on horizontal restraints. The library was refurbished in 2013, with the lecture hall redeveloped for additional book storage and computer workstation capacity.

== Governance ==
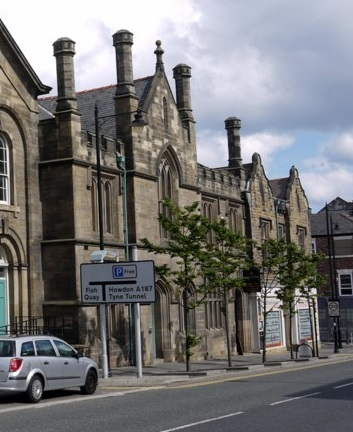
The former Tynemouth Town Hall in Howard Street

North Shields was formerly a township in the parish of Tynemouth, in 1866 North Shields became a separate civil parish, on 1 April 1908 the parish was abolished and merged with Tynemouth. In 1901 the parish had a population of 5737.

Since April 1974, North Shields has been part of the metropolitan borough of North Tyneside, formerly having been part of the County Borough of Tynemouth, which was based at Tynemouth Town Hall, in Howard Street, North Shields. Parts of the town are within the Tynemouth and North Tyneside parliamentary constituencies.

North Shields County Court and North Tyneside Magistrates' Court are also in the town. The county court houses the Employment Tribunals Office.

== Culture ==
=== Art ===
In 2009, seating inspired by Plasticine, the inventor of which was born in North Shields, was installed on Bedford Street in the town centre. The seats proved unpopular as their shape prevented rainwater draining off, so they were replaced by more traditional metal benches and moved to the Royal Quays Marina in 2011.

Fiddler's Green, a steel sculpture by artist Ray Lonsdale that serves as a memorial to fishermen lost at sea, was unveiled in 2017. In 2023, The Herring Girl, also by Lonsdale, was unveiled as a monument to the work of women in the fishing trade.

A number of pieces were installed as part of the Royal Quays development. Located in Chirton Dene, Redburn Dene, by the marina, and near the shopping outlet, they include works by Richard Broderick, Graham Robinson, Linda France, Alec Peever, Gilly Rogers, Mark di Suvero, Perminder Kaur and Andy Plant.

In 2025, a statue of Mary Ann Macham, who made her home in the town having escaped slavery and torture in the USA, was installed.

As part of the 800th anniversary celebrations, a number of murals were painted around the town.

=== In film ===
Dream On (1991) was produced by Amber Films and filmed on location in Meadow Well. Its original release was around the time of the Meadow Well riots.

=== On television ===
The BBC series When the Boat Comes In, though set in the fictional Gallowshield, was essentially set in North Shields and filmed on location around the town. Various episodes of the series Spender, which starred Jimmy Nail, and Vera, with Brenda Blethyn, were also filmed there.

=== In songs ===
Sweden's foremost troubadour of the 20th century, Evert Taube, wrote the song "Mary Strand", which is set in North Shields in 1909. Mary Strand is the proprietress of the cigar shop Tiger Brand on Dock Street and hides a young sailor from the police. The song is based on Taube's own experience, when he ran away from the steamship Australic in Newcastle upon Tyne.

=== Twin town ===
In 2017, the town was twinned with Merthyr Tydfil, in Wales, as part of the Carnegie Twin Towns Project. The project aimed to pair towns that had similar characteristics, and socio-economic challenges, in order to consider how they might make positive changes to their communities.

== Media ==
Local news and television programmes are provided by BBC North East and Cumbria and ITV Tyne Tees. Television signals are received from the Pontop Pike TV transmitter

Local radio stations are BBC Radio Newcastle, Heart North East, Capital North East, Smooth Radio North East, Greatest Hits Radio North East, Hits Radio North East, and Y Radio, a community based station.

The town is served by these local newspapers: Shields Gazette and Evening Chronicle.

== Landmarks ==
=== Lights of North Shields ===
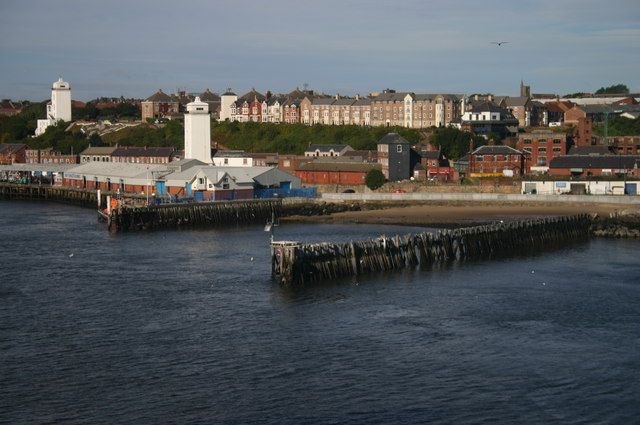
High and Low lights, new and old

Because of the difficulty of navigating ships into the mouth of the river past the dangerous Black Midden rocks, buildings were erected in the 16th century with permanent lights burning to be used as a guide by the mariners. High and Low lights are pictured on a 1655 map of the river Tyne: a pair of square castellated towers. Both lights were rebuilt in 1727, and these buildings still stand today (albeit the Old Low Light was remodelled in 1830 to serve as an almshouse). In 1810, the Old Lights were replaced by new High and Low Lights, placed respectively at the top and bottom of the steep bank alongside the river. All these lights were owned and operated by Trinity House of Newcastle-upon-Tyne until they ceased operation. Today, the Old High Beacon, as well as the High and Low Lights, are private residences; they remain prominent landmarks. In 2014 the black-painted Old Low Light was opened to the public following a substantial refurbishment; it contains a café, shop, museum, viewing platform and event space.

=== Fish Quay ===
In 1806, a market place was opened on New Quay. In 1870, work began on constructing a fish quay to provide shelter for the docked fishing boats. This quay is still in use today. In 2017, a sculpture by artist Ray Lonsdale of a lone fisherman – made of corten steel and weighing over 2 tonnes – was installed on the quay.

=== Clifford's Fort ===
Clifford's Fort, located on the Fish Quay, was built in the 17th century as a coastal defence against the Dutch. The Fort was active during the Napoleonic Wars and played a significant role during World War I, being the birthplace of the Tyne Electrical Engineers. The fort was officially evacuated by the military in May 1928, sold to the Tynemouth Corporation, and redeveloped as new fish processing facilities. Very little now remains of the original fort buildings, though the walls are intact. The area has undergone considerable restoration, with most of the fish processing units demolished. The remaining excellent modern retail units are very popular. During restoration work, part of the foundations of the 18th century Master Gunner's House (demolished in 1973) were found below the concrete floor of a fish processing unit. Elsewhere on the site, part of the stone edging of Cable Tanks belonging to the Submarine Mining Depot, established at the fort in 1888, was uncovered. The gun embrasures have been revealed, the ground resurfaced, and there are some traffic restrictions. The Old Low Light, built in 1735 and Grade II-listed, within Clifford’s Fort, has been restored and operates as a Heritage Centre, café, and community space.

=== Wooden Dolly ===
One of North Shields' oldest landmarks is the "Wooden Dolly" statue. In 1814, the female figurehead of a collier brig was placed at the entrance to Custom House Quay, on Liddell Street, and stood there until 1850, when it was vandalised. A second figurehead was placed on the same spot. The "Wooden Dolly", as the figurehead was known, was used by seafarers as a source of good-luck charms, by cutting pieces of wood from her to be taken with them on voyages. Eventually the figurehead was defaced beyond repair and after 14 years was replaced by Wooden Dolly No. 3. This remained until 1901 when it was replaced with Wooden Dolly No. 4 in the shape of a fishwife. A fifth Wooden Dolly, also a fishwife, was placed in Northumberland Square in 1958 and was removed for restoration in December 2019. Once restoration has been completed it will be placed in the Library and a replacement figure installed in the square. In 1992, a sixth Wooden Dolly was placed where the first four had been, at the entrance to Custom House Quay, and can still be seen there, next to the Prince of Wales public house.

=== Gallery ===
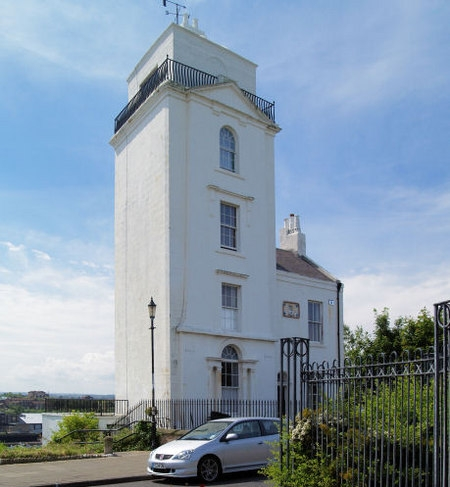
High light, built 1807

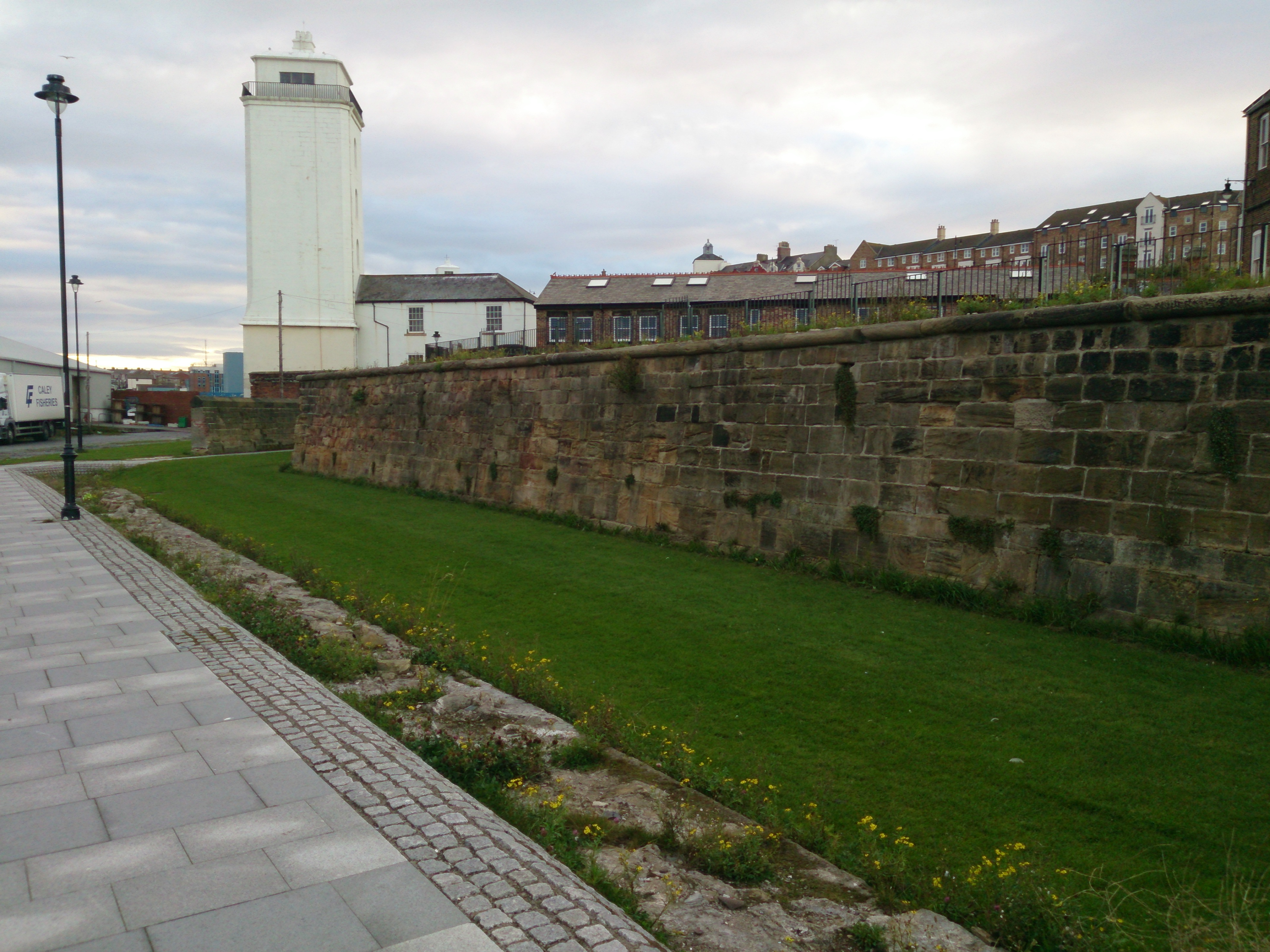
Low light and wall of Clifford's Fort

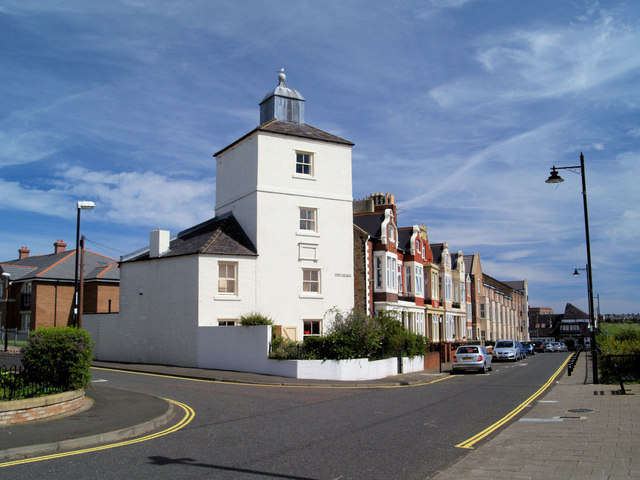
Old High light, 1727

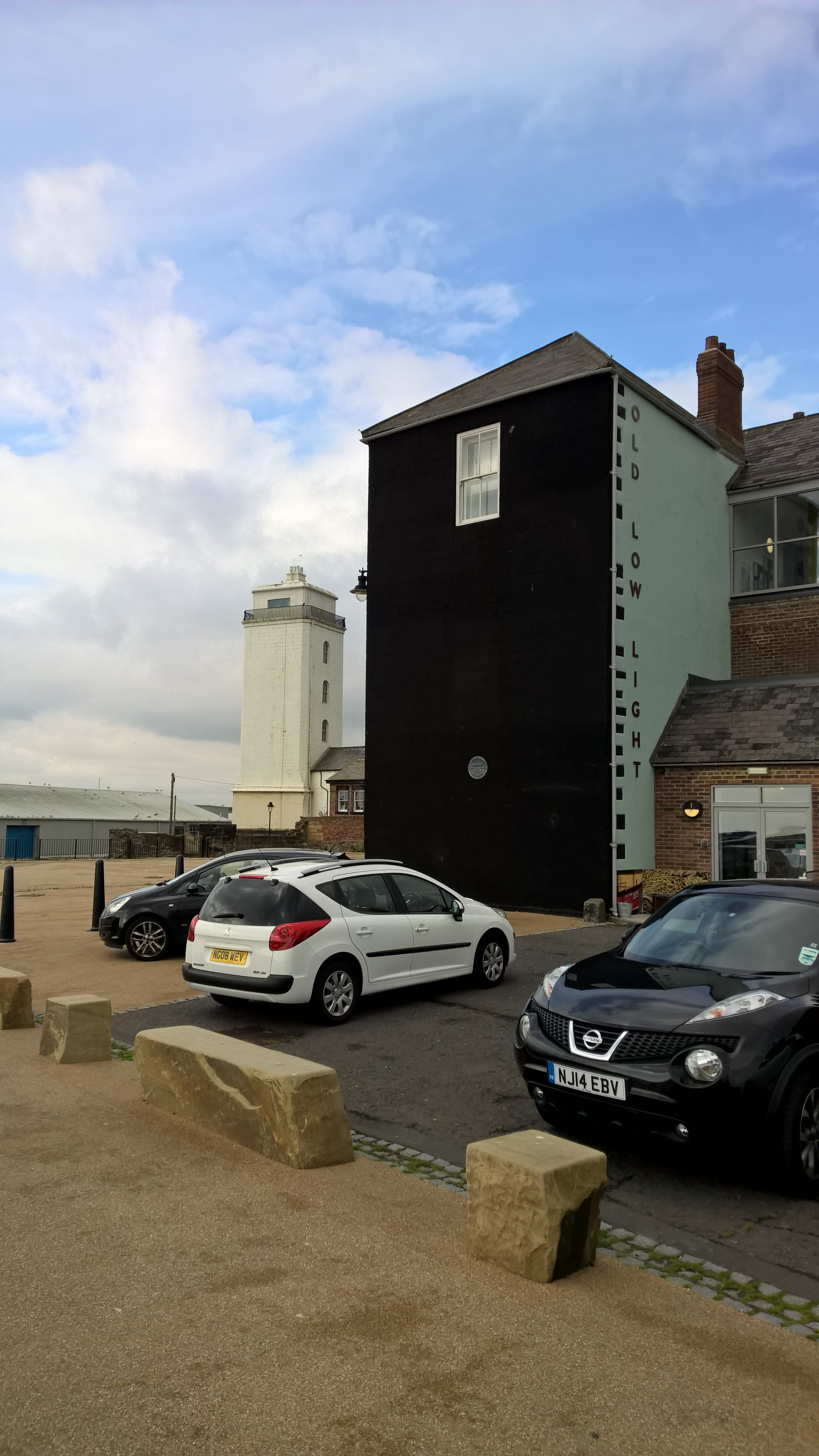
North Shields Low lights, new and old

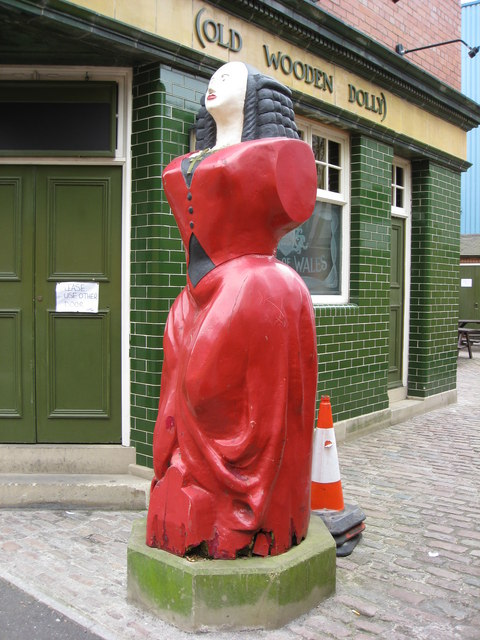
Wooden Dollie in front of The Old Wooden Dolly

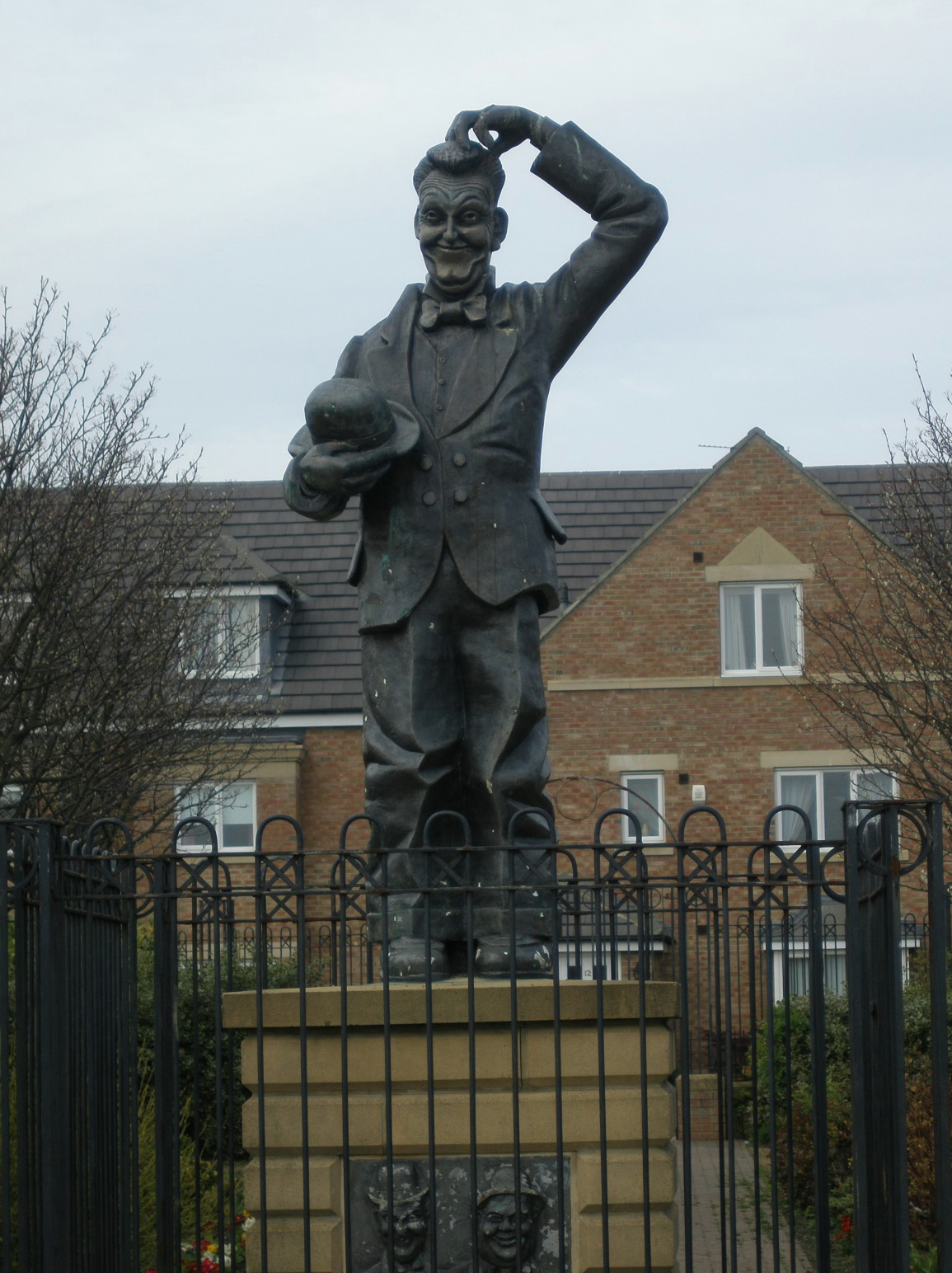
Stan Laurel statue in Dockwray Square

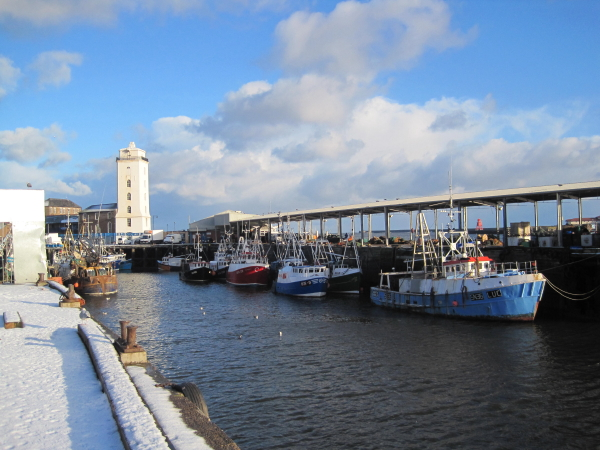
Fish Quay in winter

== Notable people ==
Prominent locals include Ralph Gardner, who opposed Newcastle when it attempted to prevent the docking of coal ships in North Shields. Gardner was imprisoned in 1653 for refusing to close his brewery which supplied provisions to the ships. In 1655, he petitioned Parliament against what he claimed were the unfair demands of Newcastle. Gardner, regarded as a local hero, had a High School named in his honour in 1933 near the former site of his cottage. The school, nicknamed 'Ralphies' /ˈræfiz/ RAF-eez by its students closed in 1994 and was redeveloped into the Gardner Park housing estate. A monument to Gardner was erected near the school.

The family of Cuthbert Collingwood, 1st Baron Collingwood (1748–1810), a notable naval commander, and Edward Collingwood (1734–1806), a barrister who ordered the construction of Dissington Hall, had their seat at Chirton Hall in Chirton, now a western suburb of North Shields. The Collingwood Arms, a public house, was later built on part of that land before being demolished in early 2005 to make way for a retirement home.

=== Academia ===
- Stanley R Dennison – economist and academic administrator
- Thomas Haswell – writer, musician, teacher and philanthropist
- Alan Johnson – political theorist
- James Egan Moulton – headmaster and Methodist minister
- Michael Thomas – linguist

=== Architecture ===
- John Dobson – architect
- J. Louis Salmond – architect

=== Arts ===
- Sam Ainsley – artist and teacher
- George Balmer – artist
- John Chambers – artist
- John Charlton – artist
- Ken Currie – artist
- Henry Hetherington Emmerson – painter and illustrator
- Myles Birket Foster – artist
- Robert Jobling – artist
- T G Purvis – marine artist
- Victor Noble Rainbird – watercolour artist
- Lyddell Sawyer – photographer
- James Shotton – artist

=== Business ===
- Maurice Joel – brewer
- George Wall – merchant and coffee planter
- Wesley S. B. Woolhouse – actuary

=== Cinema, television, and theatre ===
- Lena Ashwell – actress and theatre manager (born in the town, but raised in Canada)
- Katy Cavanagh – actress
- Andrew Dunn – actor (born in Leeds and raised in North Shields)
- Chloe Ferry – reality TV star
- Tom Hadaway – writer
- Dennis Kirkland – television producer and director
- Stan Laurel – film comedian
- Shaun Prendergast – actor
- Michael Rodd – television presenter and businessman
- Christian Rodska – actor
- Ian Whyte – actor (born in Bangor, Wales but lives in North Shields)
- Alan Young – actor

=== Fashion ===
- Lucy Ratcliffe – model

=== Industry ===
- William Harbutt – inventor of plasticine
- George and Robert Stephenson (father and son) – pioneering engineers
- William Wouldhave – inventor of the lifeboat

=== Law ===
- David McGee - New Zealand lawyer, writer and public servant
- John Shank More – lawyer, academic and anti-slavery campaigner
- John Salmond – New Zealand legal scholar, public servant and judge

=== Literature ===
- Tony Bianchi – novelist, poet, short-story writer and critic
- Henry Treece – poet, novelist and teacher
- Ian Watson – science fiction author
- Ross Welford – author
- Robert Westall – children's author

=== Medicine ===
- Byrom Bramwell – brain surgeon and pathologist
- Edwin Bramwell – neurologist
- Edward Headlam Greenhow – physician
- George Grey Turner – surgeon
- Birger Tvedt – Norwegian sports medical and physiotherapist

=== Media ===
- Carol Malia – broadcaster and journalist

=== Military ===
- Tommy Brown – youngest ever recipient of the George Medal
- Allan Grimson – former Royal Navy Petty Officer who was convicted in 2001 of murdering two young men.
- John Herbert Hedley – World War I flying ace
- Edward Jennings – Irish-born British Army officer and recipient of the Victoria Cross (died in the town)
- James Leach – British Army officer and recipient of the Victoria Cross
- John Nichol – Royal Air Force navigator
- Janet Pilgrim – British Army officer

=== Music ===
- John Anthony – record producer
- Rod Clements – guitarist and member of Lindisfarne
- Sam Fender – musician
- J. W. Fenwick – compiler of Northumbrian pipe music
- Young William Lamshaw – proponent of the Northumbrian smallpipes
- David Ross Lietch – poet and songwriter
- Jim Mageean – folk musician
- Ryan Molloy – singer, songwriter and actor
- Robert Reid – proponent of the Northumbrian smallpipes
- Neil Tennant – musician, main vocalist for Pet Shop Boys
- Andy Taylor – musician
- Hilton Valentine – musician
- Hazel Wilde – musician in Lanterns on the Lake

=== Politics ===
- Hastings Banda – physician and president of Malawi
- Thomas Burt – miner and Member of Parliament
- William Crawford – trade unionist
- Stephen Parkinson – special advisor to the British Prime Minister
- Laura Pidcock – Labour Member of Parliament for North West Durham.
- Norma Redfearn – Former Elected Mayor of North Tyneside (Born in Wallsend but lives in the town)
- Thomas Eustace Smith – English shipping magnate and Liberal Party politician
- Claire Ward – Member of Parliament and Government Minister
- Irene Ward – Member of Parliament and House of Lords
- Ernest West – Australian politician

=== Religion ===
- Séamus Cunningham – Catholic priest (ministered in the town)
- Thomas Walter Manson – minister and Biblical scholar
- Paul Mason – Roman Catholic minister

=== Sport ===
- David Boyle – footballer
- Michael Bridges – footballer
- Adam Campbell – footballer
- Paul Cannell – former Newcastle United footballer and philanthropist
- Phil Cavener – footballer
- Colin Cook – footballer
- Richard Coughtrie – cricketer
- Percy Dawson – footballer
- Paul Dickenson – hammer thrower
- David Dixon – footballer
- Dan Fawcus – footballer
- William Fawcus – rower
- Wayne Falla – cricketer
- Dave Ferguson – boxer
- Henry Fieldson – footballer
- Ron Gray – footballer
- Bill Hart – footballer
- Bill Harvey – footballer (born in Netley but died in the town)
- Matty Longstaff – footballer
- Sean Longstaff – footballer
- Shaun Lowther – Canadian soccer player
- James Miller – cricketer
- Ross Murray – runner
- Anthony Patterson – goalkeeper
- Ernie Phillips – footballer
- Iain Purdy – cricketer
- Thomas Ridley – cricketer
- Greg Rutherford – footballer
- Jock Rutherford – footballer
- Jimmy Scarth – footballer
- Anthony Shandran – footballer
- Martin Spendiff – footballer
- Craig Stanley – cricketer
- Clement Starmer – cricketer (born in Cosby but died in the town)
- Barry Stewart – cricketer
- Allan Taylor – footballer
- Les Taylor – footballer
- Joe Walton – footballer
- Steve Watson – footballer
- Peter Weatherson – footballer

== See also ==
- Distillex factory fire
- North Shields Pottery
- Seaton Carew
