= Tyne Metropolitan College =

Metropolitan College

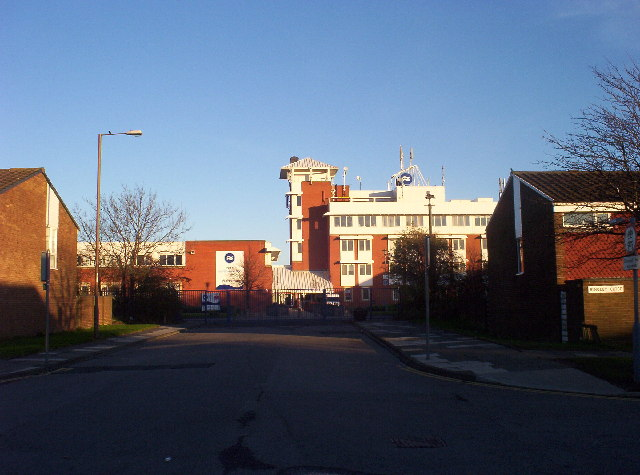
- Main site off the A1058 - the Coast Road Campus

Location
- Battle Hill Drive; Wallsend, Tyne & Wear, NE28 9NL; England; 55°00′25″N 1°30′47″W

Information
- Type: General Further Education College
- Established: 1 March 2005
- Local authority: North East England YPLA (but in North Tyneside)
- Department for Education URN: 134916 Tables
- Ofsted: Reports
- Principal & Chief Executive: Jon Vincent
- Gender: Mixed
- Age: 16+
- Former name: North Tyneside College, and Tynemouth College
- Website: http://www.tynemet.ac.uk

Tyne Metropolitan College is a college of further education in North Tyneside, England.

== About Tyne Metropolitan College ==
Tyne Metropolitan College is a General Further Education College located in the borough of North Tyneside (one of five metropolitan districts that make up the Tyne and Wear conurbation) and predominantly serves the borough of North Tyneside and the wider hinterland including the Newcastle City Region, Northumberland and South Tyneside. The College is a major employer in the borough with around 300 employees.

== History and Campus Locations ==
=== Tyne Metropolitan College, Coast Road Campus, Wallsend ===
TyneMet was established in March 2005 as a result of the amalgamation between Tynemouth Sixth Form College and North Tyneside Further Education College. TyneMet operates from three principal sites; the Coast Road Campus, which predominantly provides a vocational based curriculum with a number of higher education pathways, the Queen Alexandra Campus, located in North Shields, which offers A Level provision and a range of arts based qualifications at The Creative Studios (see further information below under Queen Alexandra Campus), and TMC in Benton, which focuses on training for the construction and building industries with a range of employment-focused vocational training programmes at levels 1, 2 and 3 (see further information below under TMC Benton). The address for the Coast Road Campus is: Battle Hill Drive, Wallsend, Tyne & Wear NE28 9NL.

=== Queen Alexandra Campus, North Shields ===
The Queen Alexandra (QA) Sixth Form College is a school–college collaboration dedicated to A Level teaching. The key partners are John Spence Community High School, Marden High School, Norham High School and Tyne Metropolitan College. Queen Alexandra offers a wide range of AS and A2 courses in a Sixth Form College giving you the independence to learn in a fully supported environment. The QA Campus is located at Hawkeys Lane, North Shields, Tyne & Wear NE29 9BZ.

=== TMC, Benton ===
A new division of the College is announced for 2013 onwards, TMC in Benton, specialising in training for the construction industry. TMC specialises in vocational training for the construction and building trades, and has a huge choice of career-based courses to supply students with the skills employers are looking for in the workplace. TMC is located at : Units 40-41, North Tyne Industrial Estate, Whitley Road, Newcastle upon Tyne NE12 9SZ.

== Courses ==
Courses offered provide vocational training. Subjects include Art & Design, Beauty Therapy, Business & Retail, Catering, Computing, Counselling, Employability, Maths and English, Engineering, Floristry, Foundation Learning, Hairdressing & Barbering, Health & Social Care, English for Speakers of Other Languages, Pharmacy, Prince's Trust Programme, Sport, Teaching, Travel & Tourism, Uniformed Services, Working with Children & Young People.

The range of full- and part-time courses extends from Entry Level through Levels 1, 2 and 3 to Higher Education programmes.

=== Target learners ===
TyneMet College caters for a wide range of age groups from those aged 14 years (alongside their GCSE studies), up to adults of any age. The main groups of students at the College are:

- 16- to 18-year-old school leavers continuing their education post-GCSE
- Adults aged 19 years and over studying on part-time courses for career advancement or for fun
- Adults aged 19 years and over studying on Higher Education (HE) programmes, such as HNCs, HNDs, Foundation Degreesa dn Teaching qualifications, in preparation for degrees.
- Employees undertaking work-based learning on tailored programmes devised between the College and their employer, or on Apprenticeship training programmes.

== Catchment ==
The college covers a geographical area from the river Tyne in the south to Bedlington in the north and bordered by the outskirts of Newcastle upon Tyne to the west. A number of students travel from more distant parts of the region, such as Teesside, to access specialist provision such as the North East Sports Academy, and the College draws increasing numbers of learners from south Northumberland.

== North East Sports Academy (NESA) ==
Students can enroll as a North East Sports Academy (NESA) student no matter which subject they are studying at Tynemet, QA or TMC. Being a member of NESA means they receive free coaching in a chosen sport: men's and women's football, rugby (union and league), men's and women's basketball, badminton or Mixed Martial Arts (MMA).

== Notable former pupils ==
- Andrew Dunn - stage, film and television actor,
- Paul Harvey British musician and Stuckist artist
- John Heppell former Labour Party politician
