= Preston, Tyne and Wear =

Coordinates: 55.0198°N 1.4547°W

Preston
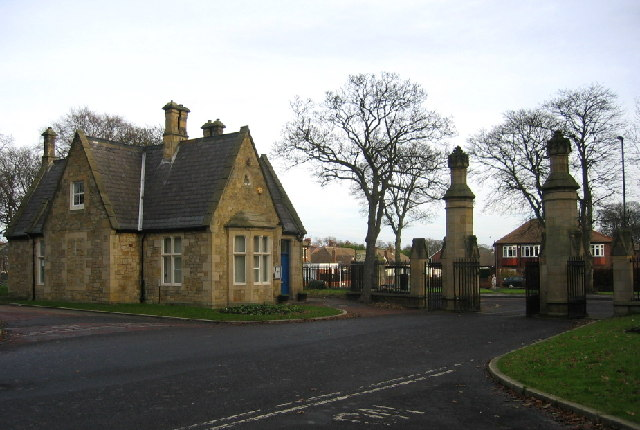
- Preston Cemetery

- Location within Tyne and Wear
- Population: 8,419 (2011.Ward)
- OS grid reference: NZ350696
- Metropolitan borough: North Tyneside
- Metropolitan county: Tyne and Wear
- Region: North East
- Country: England
- Sovereign state: United Kingdom
- Post town: NORTH SHIELDS
- Postcode district: NE29, NE30
- Dialling code: 0191
- Police: Northumbria
- Fire: Tyne and Wear
- Ambulance: North East
- UK Parliament: North Tyneside

Preston is a suburb about a mile north of North Shields, in the North Tyneside district, in the county of Tyne and Wear, England. Its population was recorded at 8419 in the 2011 census. Historically a separate entity, it has slowly been absorbed into the town to the south and expanded as to form a continuous urban area north to Monkseaton.

== History of Preston and 'Preston Township' ==
The area derives its name from the old English "Preosta", meaning Priest and "Tun", meaning enclosure or homestead. It is first mentioned in a charter dated between 1106 and 1116 and is recorded in the St. Alban's Register. At about this time the lands of Preston were granted by King Henry I to the monks of St. Oswin at Tynemouth. At the time of the Dissolution of the Monasteries in 1539, the lands were returned to the Crown. In 1649, the Township was enclosed and 265 acres (1.07 km^{2}) of land were divided and granted to various copyhold tenants. In 1832 Preston Township, together with Tynemouth, North Shields and Cullercoats was constituted a Parliamentary Borough and by an order granted on 6 August 1849, the four were incorporated into Tynemouth Borough for municipal purposes.

Preston Township lay between North Shields to the south and Monkseaton to the north. To the east was the village of Tynemouth and to the west, Chirton. In addition, when the Shire Moor was enclosed in 1788, approximately 94 acres (380,000 m^{2}) of land were annexed to Preston Township. This annex was originally known as Northumberland Place but is nowadays known as West Allotment.

Over its history, the main industries of Preston have been coal mining (from the 12th to the 20th centuries), the tanneries of the 13th century, the breweries of the 17th, 18th and 19th centuries, the damask factory of the 19th century and the carriage works of the late 19th and early 20th centuries.

Within the township is Preston Village, described by Parson and White in their descriptive book on Durham and Northumberland of 1828 as: "a very pleasant village 1-mile (1.6 km) north of North Shields to which its Township extends. It occupies a fine eminence which commands an extensive and beautiful prospect. Here are several gentlemen's villas, two public gardens, two common breweries, four public houses and a linen manufactory: besides about 100 houses and cottages which have a neat and clean appearance."

Preston was formerly a township in the parish of Tynemouth, in 1866 Preston became a separate civil parish, on 1 April 1908 the parish was abolished and merged with Tynemouth. In 1901 the parish had a population of 3337.

== Leisure ==
Tynemouth Pool is situated within the village, as are Preston Playing Fields, and the sporting facilities of John Spence Community High School. Foxhunters Field, a large open area of parkland and playing fields is to be found to the north. The area is also home to many local sporting clubs: North Shields Rugby Football Club which has its clubhouse on Preston playing fields, Percy Park RFC on Preston Avenue, Tynemouth Cricket Club and nearby Tynemouth Golf Club. North Shields Football Club also used to be based at Appleby Park before moving to their current Silkeys Lane site. North Shields Juniors AFC are also based at John Spence Community High School.

== Education ==
The area has two primary schools: Preston Grange Primary School, on the Preston Grange estate, and King Edward Primary School on Preston Avenue. Secondary education is provided by John Spence Community High School, formerly Preston High School, and further education by Queen Alexandra Sixth Form College (part of Tyne Metropolitan College).

== Services ==
The area contains many of the services for North Shields: North Tyneside East Fire Station, Preston Cemetery, North Tyneside General Hospital (which replaced Preston Hospital in the late 1980s) and a large Morrisons supermarket.

== Religion ==
There are a number of churches and religious buildings in the area:

=== Baptists Together ===
- Preston Grange Community Church

=== Church of England ===
- St Hilda's, Preston Road

=== Catholic Church ===
- St Mary's, Marden

=== The Church of Jesus Christ of Latter-day Saints ===
- meetinghouse, Malvern Road
