= Potts Print =

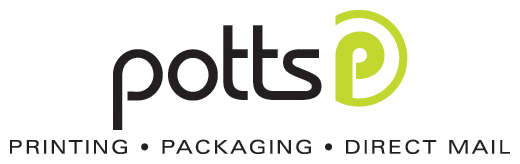
- Industry: Independent printing, packaging and direct mail company
- Founded: 1875
- Headquarters: Cramlington, Northumberland

Potts Print (UK) is an independent printing, packaging and direct mail company based in Cramlington, Northumberland. The company began in North Shields in 1875.

Historically, Potts Print (UK) was a publisher as well as a printer, operating under the name W. J. Potts during the years 1875 and 1910. Known publications include Bergen's Marine Engineer (1884), Pott's Mining Register and Directory for the Coal and Ironstone Trades of Great Britain and Ireland (1893) and Tynemouth Priory, by Canon Herbert S. Hicks (1910). Beyond 1910, the company released occasional publications under the name of J. D. Potts. Known publications include Tyneside Recitations & Other Poems, by T. Campbell (1928).

As of May 2012, Potts Print (UK) had carbon offset its entire operation and was a certified Carbon Balanced Publication Printing Company.

== History ==
In 1875, William John Potts established W. J. Potts & Son and began trading from the Atlas Printing and Publishing Works on the corner of Union and Camden Street, North Shields. John Dryden Potts was running the company in 1910, renaming it John D Potts and moving to Little Bedford Street, North Shields. His son George joined the company in 1930. The company survived both world wars, although it ceased trading for a period between 1939 and 1945 as the proprietor and staff were called up for military service. The business was incorporated as Potts Printers Limited in 1954, with George Potts as managing director. Stuart Couch, future chairman, joined as an apprentice compositor in 1950, becoming general manager in 1965 and works director in 1970. In the mid-1970s, Stuart Couch was appointed managing director and the company relocated to Waterville Road, North Shields. The current chairman and chief executive, Michael Sandford-Couch, son of Stuart, joined the company in 1985 and took control in 1995. In 2006 the company moved to a new 100,000 sq ft (9,300 m^{2}) HQ and print facility named Atlas House, in Nelson Park, Cramlington, where it is currently trading. In 2010 the company was rebranded as Potts Print (UK) Ltd. On 1 May 2012, the company achieved Carbon Balanced Publication Printing Company status.

== Expansion ==
Since becoming Potts Print (UK), the company has continued to invest in equipment and human resources. The number of employees grew from 120 to 165 people between October 2010 and June 2011. During that time the company invested over £1.3million in a third Roland 700 B1 printing press, as well as a Xerox 4112 digital press and a Buhrs BB300 envelope enclosing machine for its direct mail division. Turnover in 2010 was £12million, with a projected £15million for 2011.

== Environmental awareness ==
The printing industry has a number of environmental standards that some printing companies choose to comply with. Potts Print (UK) is accredited with the following standards: ISO 14001 - Environmental Management System, FSC - Forest Stewardship Council, PEFC - Programme for the Endorsement of Forest Certification.

== Accreditations and memberships ==
Potts Print (UK) holds accreditations from ISO 9001 - Quality Management System, OHSAS 18001 - Occupational Health & Safety, and the BRC - British Retail Consortium Approved

It is also a member of the professional organisations: NECC - North East Chamber of Commerce, NEPA - North East Publicity Association, IOM3 - Institute of Packaging. The company was previously a member of the DMA - Direct Marketing Association, but despite no longer being a member, continues to advertise itself as a member.
