= The Reception of Derrida =

The Reception of Derrida: Translation and Transformation
- Author: Michael Thomas
- Language: English
- Subject: Translation
- Published: 8 August 2006 (Palgrave Macmillan)
- Pages: 208
- ISBN: 978-1403989925

The Reception of Derrida: Translation and Transformation (Palgrave, 2006) by Michael Thomas explores the cross-cultural reception of Jacques Derrida's work, specifically how that work in all its diversity, has come to be identified with the word deconstruction. In response to this cultural and academic phenomenon, the book examines how Derrida's own understanding of translation and inheritance illuminate the 'translation and transformation' of his own works. Positioned against the misreadings of deconstruction, the book traces the relationship between Derrida's concern with the ethico-political dimension of deconstruction and an authorial legacy.

Years after his death, Derrida's legacy is still being debated in the United States and other countries.
