= John Lilley and Gillie Ltd =

John Lilley & Gillie Ltd
- Industry: Marine Engineering, supplier of Navigation Equipment
- Founded: 1812
- Founder: John Lilley and John Wilson Gillie
- Headquarters: North Shields, North Tyneside, UK
- Products: Marine Magnetic Compasses, Electro-Magnetic Speed Logs, Wind Speed & Direction Measuring Equipment, Electronic Chart Display Information Systems, Bridge Navigation Watch Alarm Systems
- Services: Fully Certificated Compass Adjusters, Marine Electronic Service Engineers
- Website: www.jlgmarine.com

John Lilley & Gillie Ltd are a developer, manufacturer and supplier of Marine Navigation Equipment headquartered in North Shields in the North East of England.

== History ==
John Wilson Gillie was born on 31 March 1864. On 31 July 1880 he was apprenticed for four years to J.J. Wilson and Sons, Nautical Instrument Makers of Sunderland. Following the apprenticeship he spent six months to a year as an ‘improver’ in Glasgow, and then started a new company ‘Wilson and Gillie’ in North Shields.

At this time sail had just given way to steam and wooden ships to steel, and the railways were competing with colliers for the carrying of coal from the North East of England to London and the South. In 1858 only seven out of 44 shipyards on the Tyne were using iron, but by 1862 there were ten, employing around 4,000 men. These changes had a significant effect on nautical instrument manufacturers, as the magnetic compass for a wooden sailing vessel was very simple and required little in the way of compensation. For steel vessels much more was required and this was a period of great development, both in the compass bowl and the binnacle in which it was housed.

In 1870 Sir William Thomson (later Lord Kelvin) designed his dry card standard compass, which completely replaced all previous designs. Wilson and Gillie started as agents for the Thomson compass, but later J.W. Gillie, using similar principles, redesigned the compass suspension and patented the ‘UNIT’ standard compass. It became popular with local shipowners and shipbuilders.

In 1910 the firm of John Lilley and Son (which had been established in London in 1812), found themselves in financial difficulties and were saved with the help of John Wilson Gillie, who established, on 8 August 1911, a new firm of John Lilley and Son Limited. John Lilley and Son had been the sole London agents for Sir William Thomson, a very enviable position during this period, when the Thomson compass led the field. Unfortunately, Mr. Lilley had quarrelled with the Glasgow company, who withdrew the agency and established their own branch in London (later to become Kelvin White and Hutton).

On November 7, 1913, the firm of John Lilley and Son Limited of London amalgamated with Wilson and Gillie of North Shields, and after this date instruments manufactured by the two companies bore the name John Lilley and Son Limited of London and North Shields.

During the 1930s many of the London nautical instrument makers were in difficulties, including John Lilley and Son Limited and Reynolds and Son, Dobbie and Clyde Limited, and Mr. J.W. Gillie arranged an amalgamation between these two companies. The new firm became Lilley and Reynolds Limited.

In 1943, with estate duties in mind, the North Shields company was reconstituted and took the name of John Lilley and Gillie Limited, although the shareholders, directors and personnel remained unchanged

In the early 1970s Lilley and Gillie developed close links with Observator in Rotterdam, who manufactured one of the first fully reliable transmitting magnetic compass systems. The Observator shareholders, Holland America Line, bought the share capital of John Lilley and Gillie Limited., but retained all the personnel and the directors.

In 1975 C.H. Turnbull joined the company as M.D. and during 1976 the company bought the shares in the London chart agent, Brown and Perring Limited, and re-acquired Lilley and Reynolds.

Since then, the company has consolidated its position as a Class A Admiralty Chart Agent and nautical instrument manufacturer, and has gradually entered the field of marine electronics. The centenary year was celebrated with the acquisition of the assets of Henry Brown & Sons (Sestrel) Limited. This firmly established the company as the leading UK manufacturer of nautical instruments.

In June 1988 the Holland America Line sold the shares in Lilley and Gillie and the London company, Brown & Perring, to Kopcke International Supply Systems, a large Dutch ship chandler owned by Consolidated Press (the Australian entrepreneur Kerry Packer's holding company). In July 1989 Lilley and Gillie, Brown and Perring and a Kopcke subsidiary, Cullen Metcalfe, were consolidated as divisions of one operating company, Sestrel International. The companies continued to operate independently and to trade under their well known individual names. Observator in the Netherlands had now become Sestrel Observator, and closer co-operation between the Dutch and UK companies was encouraged. Manufacturing for the group was consolidated in North Shields in 1991.

In 1992 Lilley and Gillie purchased sophisticated test equipment from the Admiralty Compass Observatory (A.C.O.) and gained approval from the Department of Transport to test to I.S.O. and D.O.T. requirements for individual compasses and T.M.C.’s. This was subject to the company obtaining quality acceptance to BS5750 Part II and ISO 9002, and this was achieved in November 1993.

In October 1993 Kopcke International Supply Systems decided to sell both Sestrel Observator and Brown & Perring Limited to their major competitor, Kelvin Hughes Limited. At Lilley and Gillie there was a management buy-out, with the Managing Director, Mr. Chris Turnbull, acquiring the majority of the shares, supported by Iver C. Weilbach and Company of Copenhagen, who had been friends of the company for many decades. During the next six years the company thrived, as a large proportion of the profits were reinvested. In 1997 Chris Turnbull visited the Charente Group in Liverpool, the shareholders of Dubois Phillips & McCallum Limited (now DPM (UK) Limited) with the intention of trying to acquire DPM. The discussions were turned around, and Charente eventually purchased John Lilley and Gillie Limited in June 1999.

In June 1999, Graham Knight was appointed the Managing Director, after eleven years in the position of Sales and Marketing Manager. On appointment as M.D. he immediately instigated a programme for re-engineering the existing products.

The Charente Group, which included Harrison Line, went through some changes in December 2001, which meant that Lilley and Gillie became the major company within the Group.

The company continues to look for opportunities, and in July 2002 acquired the assets of Thomas Walker & Son Limited, including the products and brand names of Walker Marine, Chernikeeff and Neco. December 2002 saw the consolidation of all the manufacturing activities to the larger Birmingham site, with sales, distribution and administration remaining at North Shields. Re-engineering of all the Walker branded products has now been carried out to take advantage of improved materials and production methods.

In June 2004 Lilley & Gillie bought a 50% holding in PC Maritime, the Plymouth-based developer of electronic chart software and associated hardware to marine markets worldwide PC Maritime's core product is Navmaster, an electronic chart system.

PC Maritime Ltd is a developer and supplier of software, electronic charts and associated hardware to marine markets worldwide. Its products include electronic navigation systems, office-based electronic chart applications, type-approved engine room training simulators and electronic chart services. An independent British company founded by David and Anne Edmonds in 1987, PC Maritime was the first manufacturer to support the UK Hydrographic Office ARCS product in 1996 and was actively involved in UKHO developments including the ECDIS service trials. PC Maritime's customers range from shipowners, shipmanagers, maritime authorities, maritime colleges, coastguards, ports, survey and salvage companies, superyachts and leisure yachtsmen.

In May 2009 John Lilley & Gillie Ltd established an office in Singapore and subsequently formed John Lilley & Gillie (Singapore)Pte Ltd. Mr Daniel Lim is the Asia Regional Sales Manager and also a Director.

The current Managing Director of John Lilley and Gillie Ltd, Glenn Heathcote, was appointed in September 2006. Glenn had spent 12 months at North Shields in 2004 and then was transferred to their sister company DPM (UK) Ltd in Liverpool where he was appointed Managing Director.

Glenn moved back to the North East, and is also a director of John Lilley & Gillie (Singapore)Pte Ltd.

In May 2013 the Directors of John Lilley & Gillie Ltd's holding company, (Harrison Maritime), decided to concentrate on the Equipment side of the business and consequently sold the Admiralty Chart agency operation within the group. Since then the company has relocated its headquarters to more suitable premises in North Shields and is continuing to innovate and ensure the products continue to meet full compliance with International Maritime regulations and Type Approvals.
