= Tynemouth Town Hall =

Municipal building in North Shields, Tyne and Wear, England

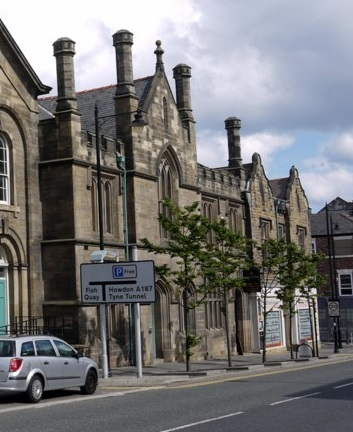
- Tynemouth Town Hall

- Shown in Tyne and Wear
- 55.0090°N 1.4438°W
- Location: Howard Street, North Shields

History
- Built: 1845

Site notes
- Architect: John Dobson
- Architectural style: Tudor style

Listed Building – Grade II
- Official name: Borough Treasurer's Department and Magistrates' Court
- Designated: 19 February 1986
- Reference no.: 1354989

Listed Building – Grade II
- Official name: Corner Building of Borough Treasurer's Department
- Designated: 19 February 1986
- Reference no.: 1299975

Listed Building – Grade II
- Official name: Borough Treasurer's Department
- Designated: 19 February 1986
- Reference no.: 1299964

Tynemouth Town Hall, also known as North Shields Town Hall, is a municipal building in Howard Street, North Shields, Tyne and Wear, England. The town hall, which was the headquarters of Tynemouth County Borough Council, is a Grade II listed building.

== History ==
Following their appointment in 1828, the new town commissioners for North Shields decided to commission municipal offices: this became possible because of a gift from a solicitor and bank agent, Joseph Laing, who was an enthusiastic supporter of the town. The site they selected was to the immediate north-west to the old Poor Law Guardians' Office on the corner of Howard Street and Saville Street.

The new building was designed by John Dobson in the Tudor style and opened as the North Shields Municipal Offices in 1845. The design involved a main frontage of four bays facing onto Howard Street; the second bay from the left, which slightly projected forward, featured an arched doorway on the left and a mullioned window on the right on the ground floor; there was a tall pointed and mullioned window on the first floor and a gable and finial above. The other bays incorporated mullioned windows on both the ground floor and the first floor and the roof line was castellated. At the back of the building a wing extended to the south east creating a frontage on Saville Street. A bust of Joseph Laing was commissioned by his friends after his death in June 1847 and installed in the building. The facilities inside the building included a courtroom, a police station and cells for five prisoners.

After significant population growth, largely associated with the tourism and fishing industries, North Shields was absorbed into the new municipal borough of Tynemouth in 1849. The new council chose to adopt the building in North Shields as its town hall. The area was advanced to the status of county borough in 1904. A portrait of the first member of parliament for Tynemouth and North Shields, George Frederick Young, who had been elected in 1832, was donated to the town by Joseph Laing's family and installed in the town hall in 1906.

As the responsibilities of the council increased the building became increasingly cramped; the council acquired both the Methodist Church to the north west of the town hall, which had been designed by John and Benjamin Green and completed in 1857, and the old Poor Law Guardians' Office to the south east, which had been designed by John and Benjamin Green and completed in 1837. Some council departments including the town clerk's office moved out to 14 Northumberland Square in North Shields after the First World War. The building continued to serve as the offices of the Borough Treasurer but ceased to function in any municipal capacity after the enlarged North Tyneside Council was formed in 1974. The former Poor Law Guardians' Office, which had served for a while as an electricity showroom, became the offices of a firm of estate agents in the early 21st century, while another part of the complex was converted for use as a community theatre known as "The Exchange" in January 2016.
