= Distillex factory fire =

2002 industrial fire in North Shields, England

- Date: 12 April 2002
- Time: 3.00 pm BST (UTC+01:00)
- Location: Distillex Ltd. East Percy Street North Shields Tyne and Wear NE30 1DT England; 55.011991°N 1.436512°W
- Cause: Ignition of flammable solvents by spark from cutting equipment.
- Inquiries: Health and Safety Executive Case No. 10506590
- Charges: 2 breaches of the Health and Safety at Work etc. Act 1974
- Verdict: Guilty on both charges; fined a total of £39,000 and ordered to pay costs of £7,975
- Location of the Distillex factory in Tyne and Wear.

The Distellex factory fire started at the Distillex chemical plant in North Shields, England on 12 April 2002. Distillex Ltd. operated a chemical recovery service, annually recycling 10,000 tonnes (11,023 tons) of oxygenated, hydrocarbon, and halogenated solvents and 1,000 tonnes (1,102 tons) of other chemical wastes produced by manufacturing industries and laboratories. The plant was situated in the middle of a largely residential area.

== Fire ==
The fire was caused by sparks from an angle grinder igniting solvent-contaminated rags in a waste skip. This spread rapidly to a storage area holding 400,000 litres of chemicals. The fire was compounded by chemicals mixing with melting plastic from intermediate bulk containers.

=== Emergency services response ===
Northumbria Police immediately declared a Major Incident, and set up a half-mile exclusion zone around the factory, causing the evacuation of around 500 residents. More than 150 police officers were deployed to patrol the exclusion zone while 300 fire fighters tackled the fire. As the fire spread through the factory there were a number of explosions which launched containers and drums into the air and a thick plume of toxic smoke, visible more than 20 miles away, was produced.

Both the Tyne and Wear Metro light rail system, between Tynemouth and North Shields, and the Tyne road tunnel beneath the River Tyne were closed down while the fire was active. A 5-mile (8 km) no-fly zone was also placed over nearby Newcastle International Airport. It took 25 fire appliances 5 hours to bring the fire under control, and damping down continued through the following day.

== Investigation ==
On 15 April 2002, the Health and Safety Executive (HSE) began an investigation of the fire. On the same date Chris Nicholls, operations director at Distillex, told BBC Radio Newcastle that the solvents recycling operation would not continue and admitted: "Seeing the aftermath of this incident it would seem it is an inappropriate location for such an operation."

=== Prosecution ===
Following the investigation the HSE prosecuted Distillex for 2 breaches of the Health and Safety at Work etc. Act 1974 for failing to ensure the safety of the public and its own employees. Although Distillex pleaded guilty, magistrates at North Tyneside magistrates court instead referred the case to a crown court judge after deciding the maximum £40,000 fine they could impose was insufficient. In November 2002, at Newcastle Crown Court, Judge Peter Bullock fined the company a total £39,000. Alan Campbell, the MP for Tynemouth, said that the judge had been "far too lenient". He added: "I was there on the day of the fire and saw the damage and disruption it caused to North Tyneside. It was a huge risk to public safety. This is another example of the law being clear, penalties being available and courts failing to use the powers available to them."

== Previous incidents ==
On 30 January 2002, the factory was the source of a release of harmful chemical vapour after a tank containing methyl chloride overheated. The incident was reported at 6.40 am GMT and required 50 firefighters to bring it under control. A 1-mile cordon was set up by police around the factory and residents warned to stay indoors with all doors and windows closed. The Tyne and Wear Metro station at Tynemouth and nearby schools were closed.
