= North Shields Pottery =

English pottery manufacturer

North Shields Pottery was an English pottery manufacturer that created earthenware ceramics from circa 1818 to circa 1913 under a succession of owners and company names.

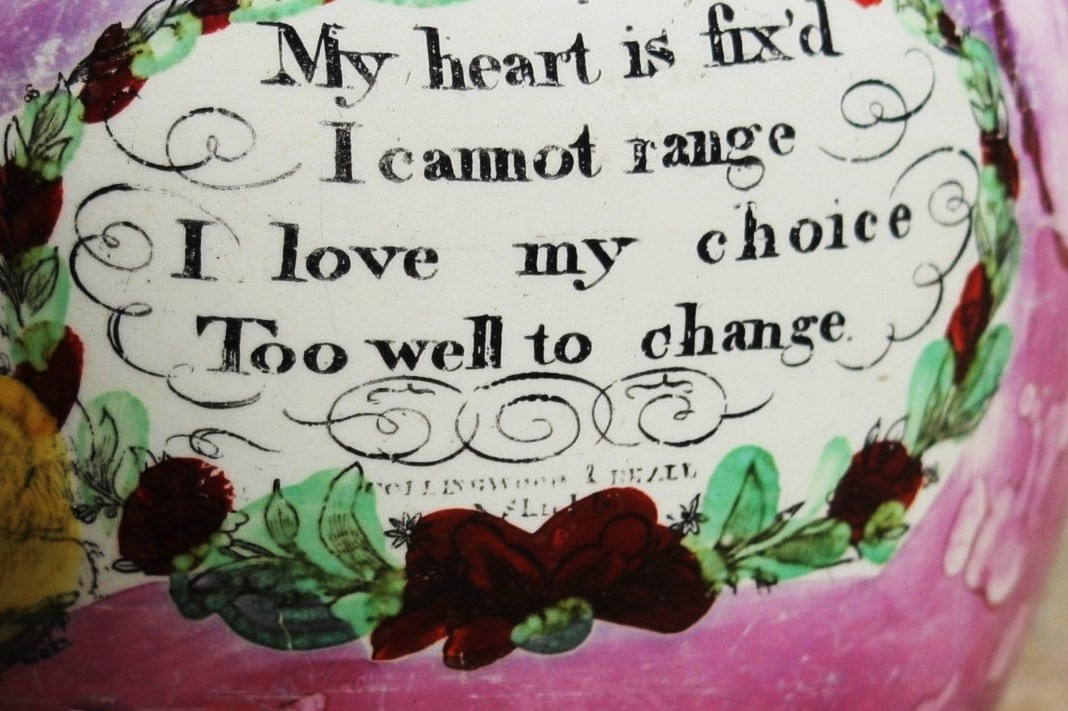
Collingwood & Beall Jug

The company was first established at the Low Lights, North Shields, in c.1818 by William Collingwood.

Subsequently, the business became a partnership with John Thompson, trading as "William Collingwood & Company". Although this firm was dissolved in February 1819, William Collingwood carried on alone. Unfortunately, he was soon declared bankrupt and by 1823 the business was owned by Nicholas Bird and trading as "Bird & Co.".

In October 1826 the business was advertised for sale, under the name of "The Northumberland Earthenware Manufactory" and a little later, Mr Bird was also declared bankrupt in October 1827 and the business was sold at auction in January 1828.

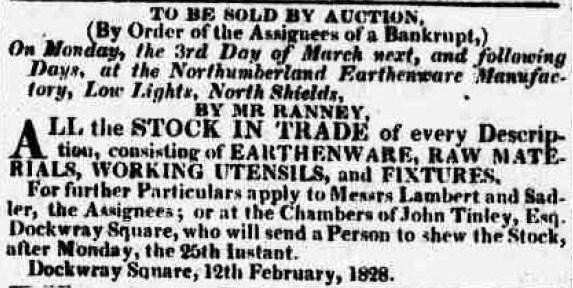
Auction 1828

In August 1828, it was announced that the business was now owned by Messrs Robert Cornfoot & John B. Colville, and had commenced business as Cornfoot, Colville & Co., advising the public that they had engaged the services of an experienced, steady and active manager from the Staffordshire Potteries.

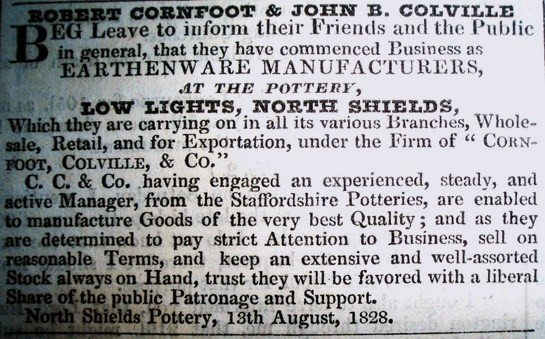
Cornfoot & Colville 1828

However, in May 1831 the business was again up for sale and by March 1832 "The North Shields Earthenware Manufactory" was doing business under the ownership of Cornfoot, Carr & Co., advertising to the public for home consumption or exportation, their stock of best quality goods and ornamental vases of superior quality and exquisite workmanship.

Robert Cornfoot died in November 1837, and in February 1838 the firm became known as "Carr and Patton" and were able, by their alliance with an eminent Staffordshire manufactory, to procure the newest models and patterns of any article of china of the best quality and fashion at manufacturers prices. In July 1838, they provided the plates, etc., for a Coronation celebration dinner given by the Borough of Tynemouth, for around 900 aged North Shields seamen, each piece having a portrait of the Queen in the centre surrounded by an inscription. In March 1844, an alarming fire was discovered to be raging in Carr & Patton's extensive pottery at North Shields and almost the entire stock and materials were lost. By 1846, Carr and Patton were listed as the owners of both North Shields Pottery and the Phoenix Pottery in Newcastle, and a thorough description of the activities and procedures of the business at North Shields was featured in the local press but this partnership was dissolved on 31 December 1846 and by 1850 the North Shields pottery was trading as "Carr & Co.". A few years later, in 1855, they announced the opening of a show room in Norfolk Street in the town, under the name of "John Carr & Son".

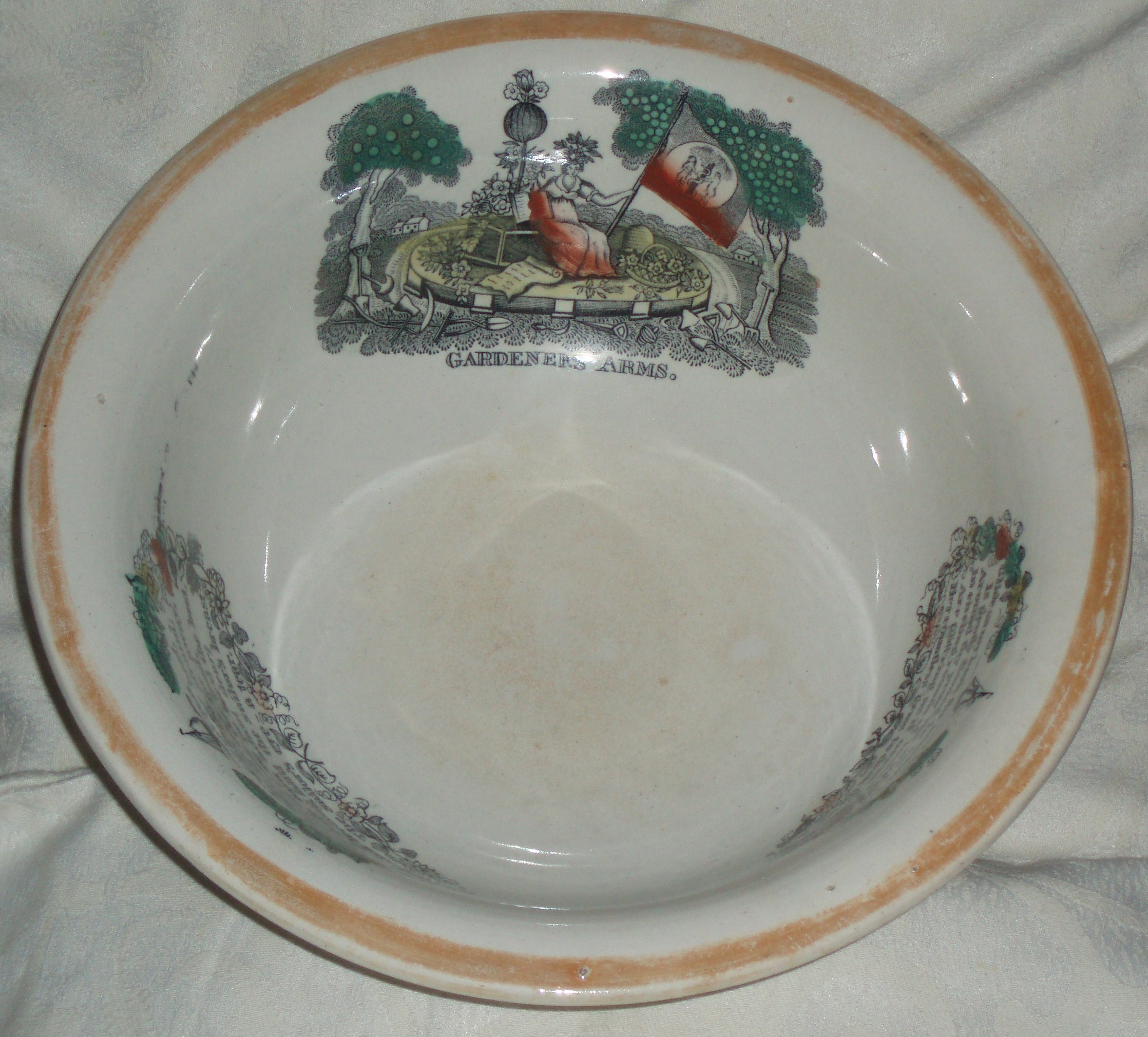
John Carr & Sons Gardeners Arms Bowl

Having produced brown and black wares in addition to the ordinary earthenware since the start, this was discontinued in 1856 and substituted with white, cream coloured, printed, painted and lustred (Sunderland Lustreware) varieties. These were also exported, principally to the Mediterranean ports and via Alexandria to Cairo and across the Red Sea to Bombay (Mumbai).

In February 1857, the business was again put up for sale, John Carr intending to retire, but on this occasion, it did not change hands. In 1861, the name changed to "John Carr & Sons" and the firm remained as such until it closed. John Carr Snr. died in November 1863 and the business now passed into the hands of his sons. In 1873, recruitment of pottery staff was advertised in Glasgow and Staffordshire. Fire was a constant hazard and two fires, in February 1881 and December 1882 each caused a considerable amount of damage.

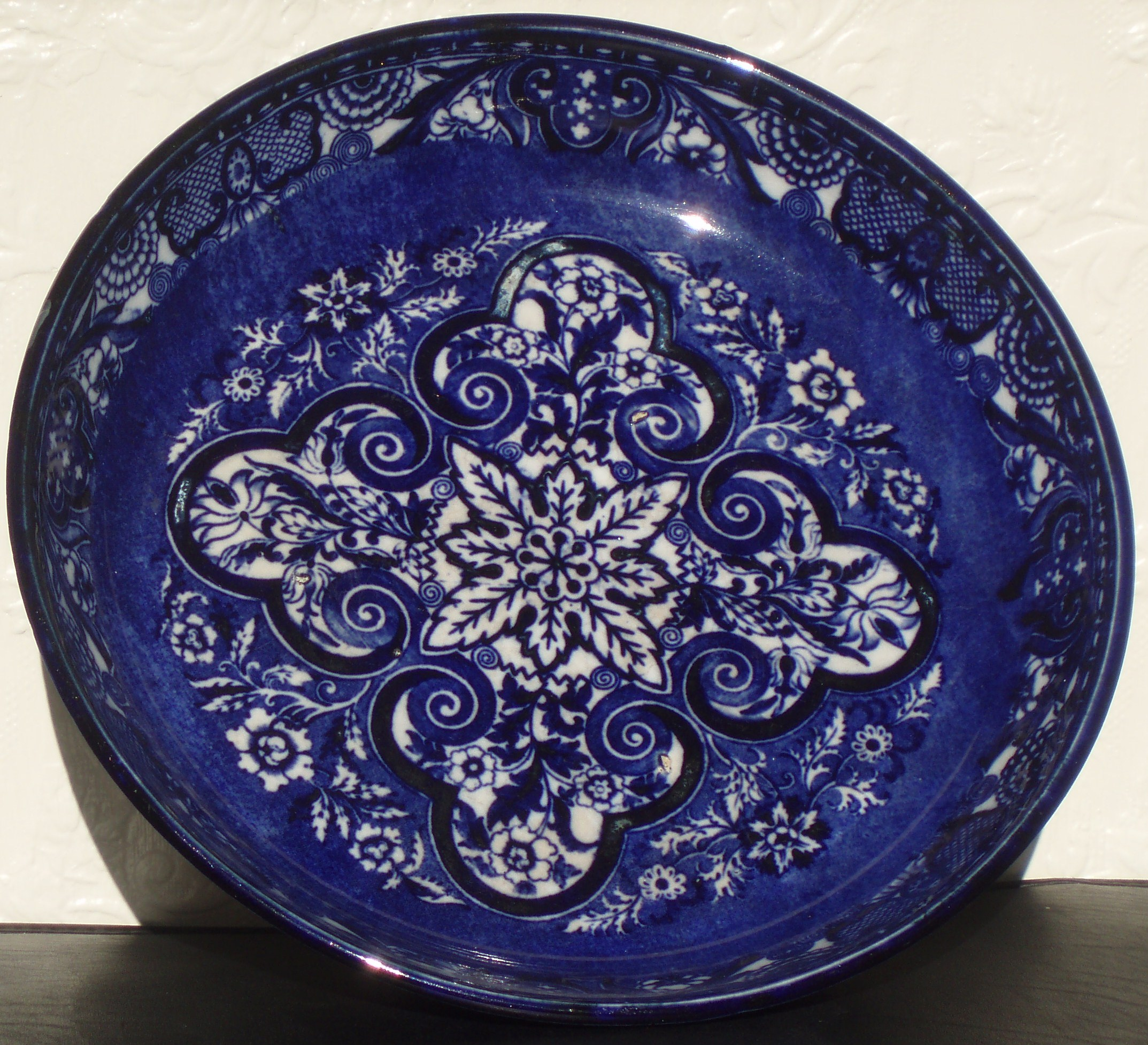
John Carr & Sons Geometric Pattern Dish

In April 1884, another fire broke out in the drying house and the building was completely gutted, damage was estimated to be under £1000.00. In June 1893, John Carr Jnr.,Arnold Ormston Carr and Joseph James Carr left the remaining brother, Robert Cornfoot Carr, to continue the business as a Flint Grinder and Glazed Brick manufacturer on his own, but under the same name of John Carr and Sons. Later that year, the sale took place of much of the moulds and machinery then, in December 1893, a further fire broke out in the printing and dipping department and again the building was gutted and damage was considerable, very many pieces of ware in the final stages of preparation were lost. The remaining stock of pottery was taken over by one of the employees, Mr.M.King, and sold from a large warehouse on the premises.

The manufacture of pottery had actually been discontinued since June and the end of pottery making in North Shields was confirmed with the sale of the remaining plant and machinery in March 1894. The company did continue in the manufacture of glazed bricks and other similar items, until around 1910.[ The firm eventually closed completely and the buildings were dismantled in 1913.

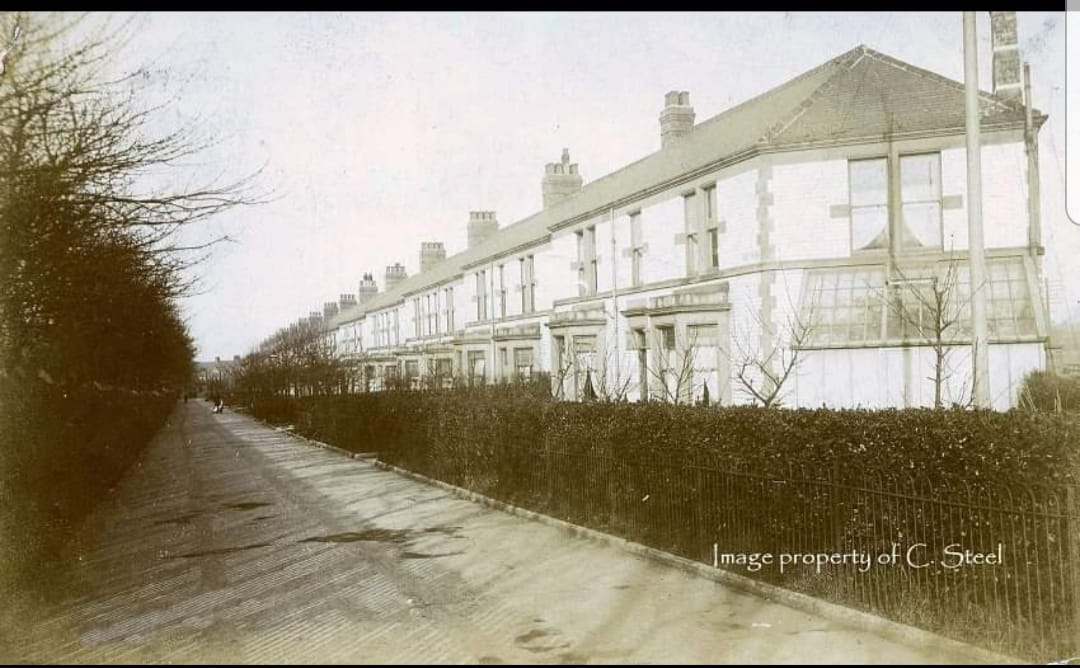
Percy Avenue, Whitley Bay

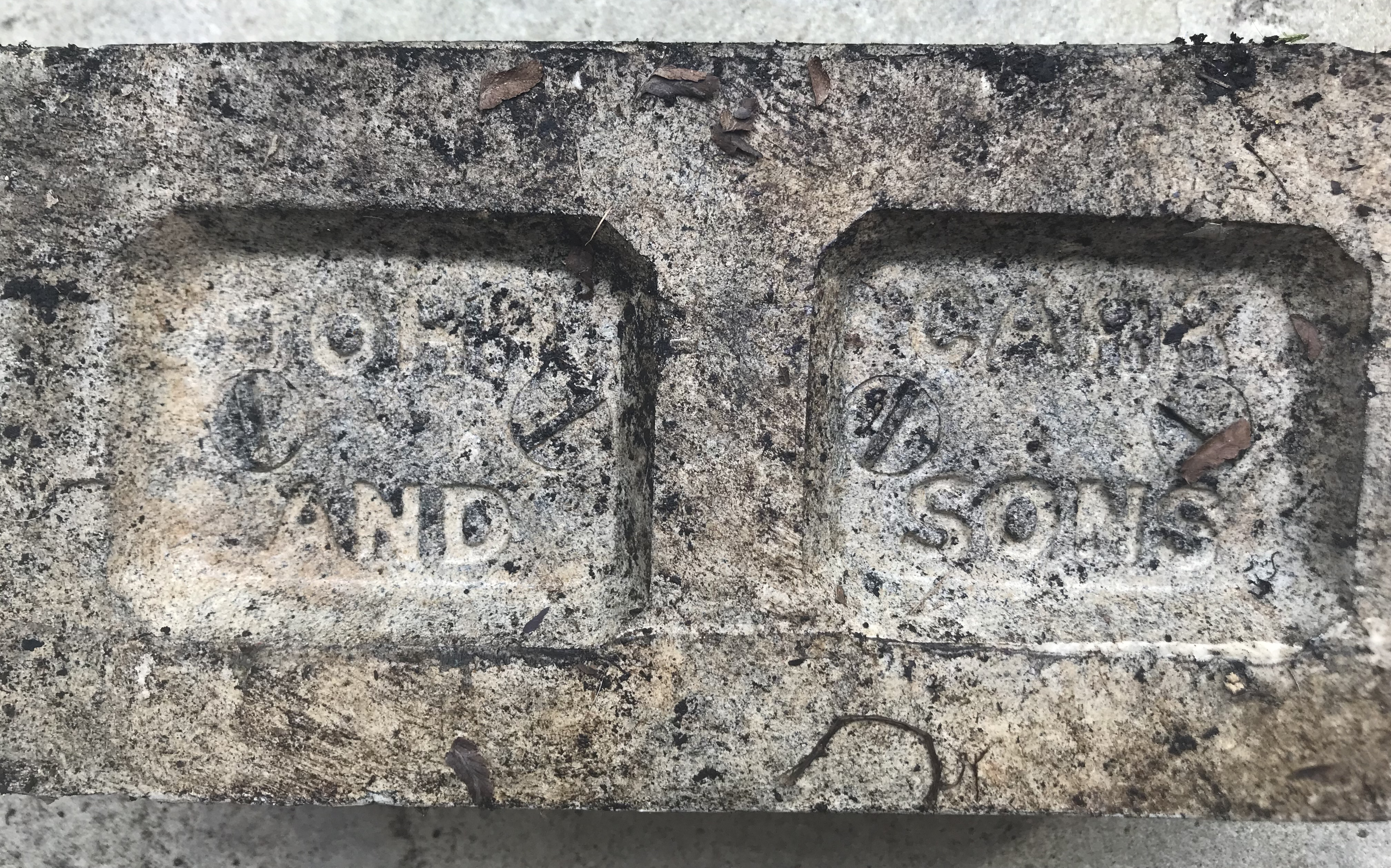
Glazed white brick

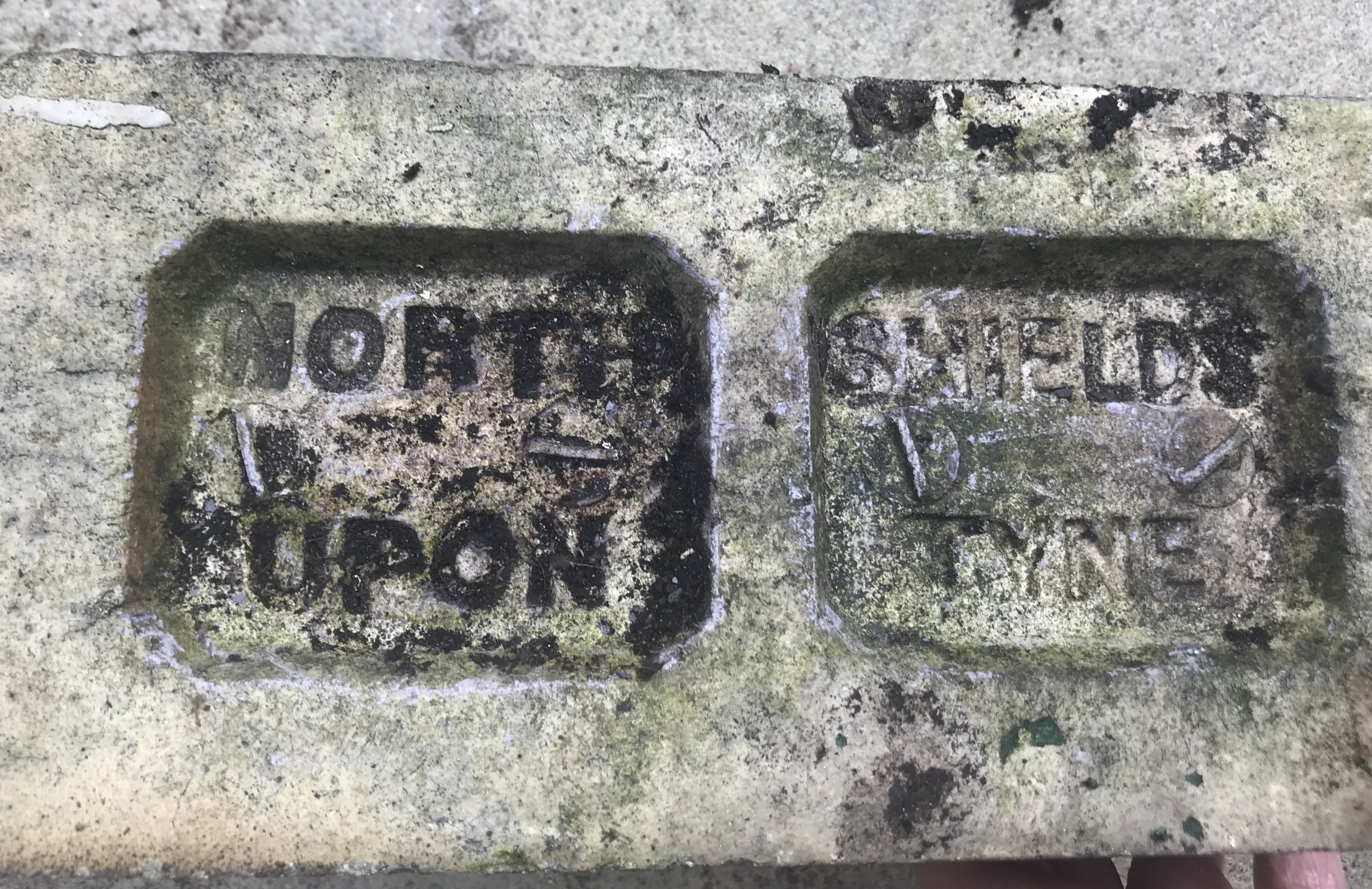
Glazed white brick, John Carr & Sons

A lasting example of the company's white glazed bricks can be seen on the frontage of three terraces in Whitley Bay - Percy, Warkworth and Alnwick Avenues - built in 1900 on land sold by the Northumberland Estate

During renovation work on nearby Cliffords Fort, whilst re-opening some embrasures which were bricked up during the 1880s, it was discovered that they had been filled with quantities of pottery waste from the Low Lights Pottery. As much of the production was for export, particularly to India and Egypt, many of the forms and patterns found were of a type not seen on Tyneside and it is hoped that enough material will be recovered to put together a small exhibition.

The importance of the pottery to the local economy can be shown by the numbers employed. In 1851, this was 65 men, 32 women, 26 boys and 22 girls. In 1861 this had become 50 men, 15 women and 20 boys. Ten years later, this had changed to 54 men, 28 women, 38 boys and 22 girls, and in 1881, adult employment had increased to 72 men, 45 women plus 21 boys

== Bibliography ==
- Bell, R. C. (1971). Tyneside Pottery. Studio Vista. ISBN 0-289-70053-1.
- Bell, R. C.; Gill, M. A. V. (1973). The Potteries of Tyneside. Frank Graham. ISBN 0-902833-77-4.
- Bell, R. C. (1989). Maling & other Tyneside Potteries. Shire Publications Ltd. ISBN 0-85263-792-6.
- Jewitt, Llewellynn (1878). The Ceramic Art of Great Britain from Prehistoric Times down to the Present Day. Kessinger Publishing. ISBN 1-104-90975-8.
- Gibson, M. (2006). 19th Century Lustreware. Antique Collectors Club. ISBN 978-1-85149-306-7.
- Blacker, J. F. (1911). Nineteenth Century English Ceramic Art. Stanley Paul Ltd. ISBN 978-1-151-75578-0.
