= Northumberland Park, North Shields =

Public park in the UK

Northumberland Park
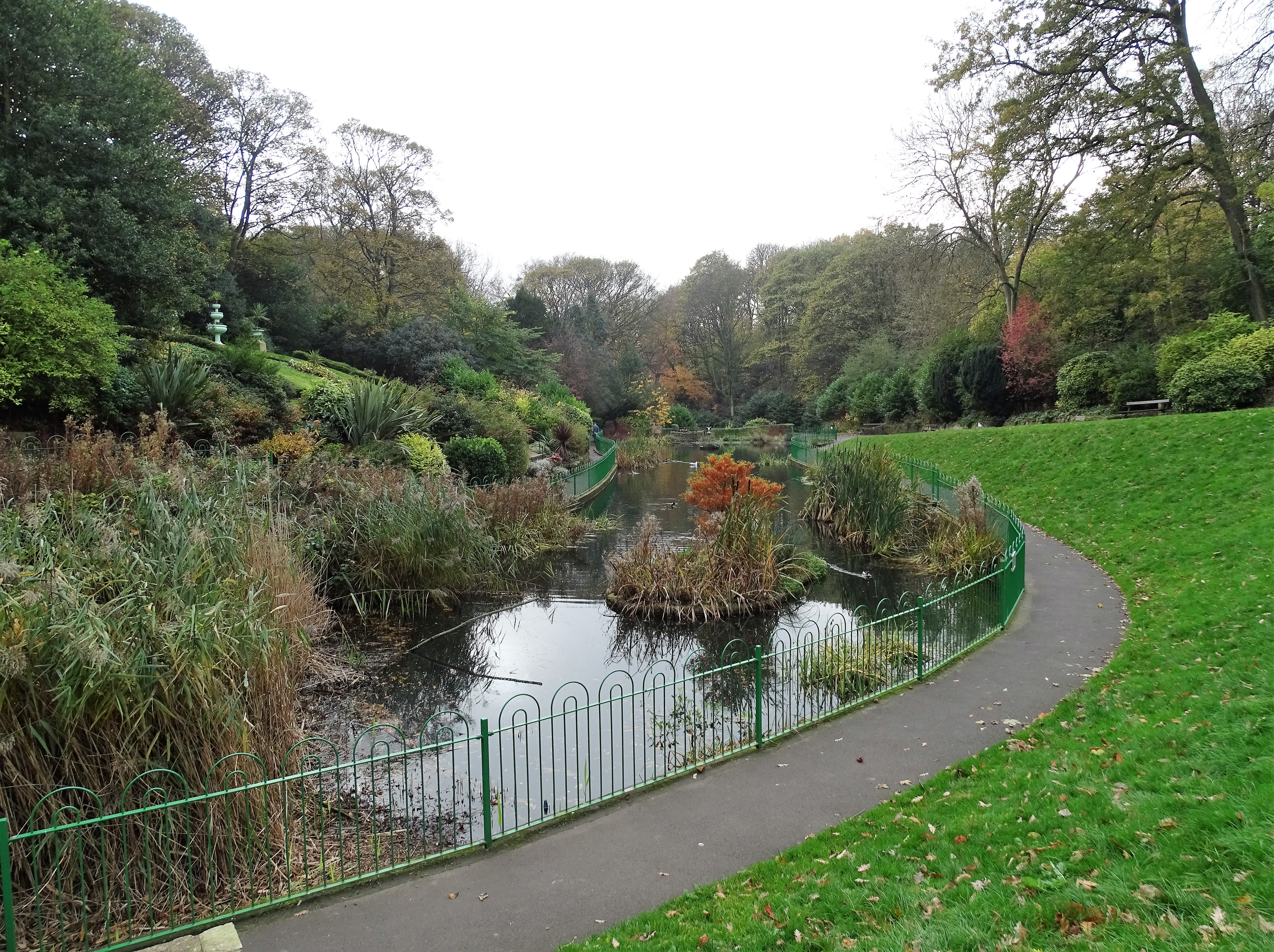
- Pond in Northumberland Park in 2022
- Type: Urban park
- Location: North Shields, United Kingdom
- Coordinates: 55.0168°N 1.435°W
- Area: 12 ha (30 acres)
- Opening: 11 August 1885
- Status: Open all year

Northumberland Park is a public park in North Shields, United Kingdom. The park has multiple facilities, including a herb garden, a pet cemetery and two outdoor bowling clubs.

== History ==
The idea for the park was conceived during the Long Depression in the 1880s by a local alderman to provide work for unemployed shipbuilders. The 6th Duke of Northumberland donated the land, and in December 1884 construction began. On 11 August 1885, the park was opened by the Duke, who planted a Turkey oak that still survives.

In 1949, a pet cemetery was added to the park after request from the RSPCA. The cemetery has been filled and counts more than 200 headstones.

In 2015, the park was reopened after a large renovation. During the renovation remains of medieval buildings were found. An archaeological dig had previously succeeded in finding remains of a medieval hospital at the site.
