= Michael Thomas (academic) =

English linguist and professor

Michael Thomas (born 1969) is research professor at Liverpool John Moores University. His work incorporates the field of digital education in relation to social justice, the educational implications of disadvantage, online and distance education, digitally mediated communication, and higher education policy.

== Education ==
Thomas attended Collingwood Junior School, Norham High School and Tynemouth Sixth Form College. He has studied at Newcastle University, the University of Manchester, Lancaster University, Cardiff University, Wales, the University of the West of England and the University of Leicester in the U.K. as well as at Cornell University in the U.S.. He holds a Ph.D. in Critical and Cultural Theory from Newcastle University focusing on the work of the French philosopher Jacques Derrida, deconstructionism and post-modernism, and a Ph.D. in Applied Linguistics from Lancaster University, which explored technology-mediated project-based learning.

== Career ==
Thomas was previously a lecturer at the University of Heidelberg in Germany (1998), Associate Professor (2002), and then Professor (2009) in English Communication at Nagoya University of Commerce & Business, Japan. He moved to the University of Central Lancashire in 2010, where he became Professor of Higher Education and Online Learning. Thomas has also held visiting or affiliated positions at Stuttgart University and Mannheim University in Germany, the University of Liverpool in the UK, and Harvard University in the US.

Thomas has published over 20 authored and edited books in these fields. He is the founding and lead editor of four international book series: Digital Education and Learning (publisher: Palgrave Macmillan), Global Policy and Critical Futures in Education (publisher: Palgrave Macmillan), Advances in Digital Language Learning and Teaching (publisher: Bloomsbury), and Advances in Virtual and Personal Learning Environments (publisher: IGI). He has authored 3 monographs and edited 26 books. Thomas was the founding editor-in-chief of the Scopus-indexed International Journal of Virtual and Personal Learning Environments, and since 2014, he has been a member of the journal's International Advisory Board.

Thomas was the project coordinator and principal investigator of the EU-funded CAMELOT Project on Language Learning with Machinima, a two-year project consisting of nine European Union partners that ran from December 2013 until November 2015. He was a partner in the Erasmus+ VITAL project on learning analytics and online learning (2015–17) and the coordinator of the EU GUINEVERE project (KA2 Strategic Partnership in Schools) on digital gaming in immersive environments (2017–19).

Outside of academia, he has published articles in The Times Higher Education Supplement on the use of iPods and podcasting and The Guardian as a contributor in a debate about massive open online courses and the future of higher education. He has also been interviewed by the French-language publication Regards Sur Le Numerique on the subject of digital natives, among others. Thomas is a Principal Fellow of the Higher Education Academy and the Royal Society of Arts.

== Authored Monographs ==
- Language Teaching with Video-based Technologies: Creativity and CALL Teacher Education (Routledge, 2020) (authored with Christel Schneider).
- Project-based Language Learning with Technology (Routledge, 2017).
- The Reception of Derrida: Translation and Transformation (Palgrave Macmillan, 2006).

== Edited books ==
- Recent Developments in Technology-Enhanced and Computer-Assisted Language Learning (IGI, 2020) (edited with Bin Zou).
- Handbook of Research on Integrating Technology into Contemporary Language Learning and Teaching (IGI, 2018) (edited with Bin Zou).
- Digital Language Learning and Teaching: IV Volumes (Bloomsbury, 2017) (edited with Julie Sykes, Hayo Reinders and Mark Peterson).
- E-Research in Educational Contexts (Routledge, 2017) (edited with Jocelyn Wishart).
- Researching Language Learner Interaction Online: From Social Media to MOOCs (CALICO, 2015) (edited with Ed Dixon).
- Contemporary Task-Based Language Teaching in Asia (Bloomsbury, 2015) (edited with Hayo Reinders).
- Design, Implementation, and Evaluation of Virtual Learning Environments (IGI, 2012).
- Contemporary Computer-Assisted Language Learning (Bloomsbury, 2012).
- Digital Education: Opportunities for Social Collaboration (Palgrave Macmillan, 2011).
- Deconstructing Digital Natives: Young People, Technology, and the New Literacies (Routledge, 2011).
- Technology Enhanced Learning: Quality of Teaching and Educational Reform. Series: Communications in Computer and Information Science (Springer, 2010).
- Task-Based Language Learning and Teaching with Technology (Continuum, 2010) (edited with Hayo Reinders).
- Interactive Whiteboards for Education: Theory, Research and Practice (IGI Global, 2010) (edited with Euline Cutrim Schmid).
- Online Learning: IV Volumes (SAGE Publications, 2010).
