= Ross Welford =

English children's science fiction and fantasy writer (born 20th century)

- Born: 20th century Cullercoats, England, U.K.
- Education: Leeds University
- Occupation: Children writer
- Organisation: The Magic Circle
- Website: rosswelford.com

Ross Welford (born 20th century) is an English children's science-fiction and fantasy writer.

== Biography ==
Welford was born in Cullercoats, a small seaside town in the north-east of England. He attended Marden High School and studied English at Leeds University before becoming a magazine journalist and then a television producer.

== Career ==
He first started writing his debut novel, Time Travelling with a Hamster, in 2014. It was published in 2016 and was shortlisted for the Costa, Blue Peter, Waterstones, and Branford Boase Awards.

It was followed by nine other novels between 2017 and 2025.

== Other information ==
Welford was admitted into The Magic Circle in 2019.

Cullercoats appears as 'Culvercot' in Welford's books.

== Bibliography ==
Year	Title	Publisher
2016	Time Travelling with a Hamster	HarperCollins Children's Books
2017	What Not to Do If You Turn Invisible	HarperCollins Children's Books
2018	The 1,000 Year Old Boy	HarperCollins Children's Books
2019	The Dog Who Saved the World	HarperCollins Children's Books
2020	The Kid Who Came from Space	HarperCollins Children's Books
2021	When We Got Lost in Dreamland	HarperCollins Children's Books
2022	Into the Sideways World	HarperCollins Children's Books
2023	The Monkey Who Fell from the Future	HarperCollins Children's Books
2024	Time Travelling with a Tortoise	HarperCollins Children's Books
2025	The Unlikely Diary of Prince Kal the Alien	HarperCollins Children's Books
