= Marden High School =

School in North Shields, Tyne and Wear, England

Location
- Hartington Road; North Shields, Tyne and Wear, NE30 3RZ; England; 55.02723°N 1.44141°W

Information
- Type: Foundation school
- Motto: Carpe Diem!
- Established: 1968
- Local authority: North Tyneside
- Department for Education URN: 108627 Tables
- Ofsted: Reports
- Head Teacher: Karen Robson
- Gender: Coeducational
- Age: 11 to 16
- Enrolment: 745
- Houses: Alnwick, Bamburgh, Warkworth, Dunstanburgh
- Colours: Green, White & Purple
- Website: www.mardenhigh.net

Marden High School is a coeducational secondary school located in Cullercoats, Tyne and Wear, England. The Marden City Learning Centre, opened 15 July 2003, was situated on the grounds in front of the school. However, Woodlawn School has now replaced the Marden City Learning Centre.

In 2015 the school began building a new school building through the Priority Schools Building Programme. This was completed in 2016. The older building was demolished and replaced with a car park and field. This work was fully completed in 2017.

== Notable former pupils ==
- David Bradley - award-winning science journalist and author of the book Deceived Wisdom
- Bryony Corrigan, actress
- Chris Day - hepatologist, and Vice-Chancellor of Newcastle University from 2017.
- Andrew Dunn - stage, film and television actor
- Andy Ogle - professional Mixed Martial Artist, Featherweight for the UFC
- Andy Taylor - guitarist with Duran Duran
- Carol Malia - BBC Look North flagship presenter
- Chloe Ferry - Geordie Shore
- Marion Fawkes - Former world, European and EU race walking champion. Former world record holder for 3k, 5k, and 10k race walks.
- Ross Welford - Children's author.
