= John Spence Community High School =

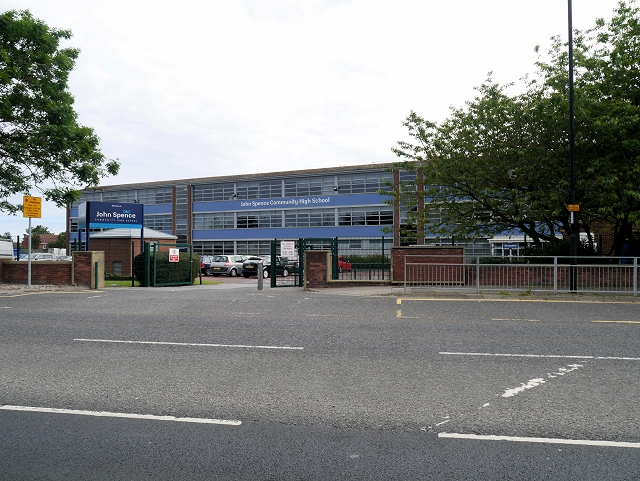
- Pictured in 2014

Location
- Preston Road; Preston; North Shields, Tyne and Wear, NE29 9PU; England; 55°01′21″N 1°27′05″W

Information
- Type: Academy
- Local authority: North Tyneside
- Trust: Pele Trust
- Department for Education URN: 150195 Tables
- Ofsted: Reports
- Headteacher: Jonathan Heath
- Gender: Mixed-sex
- Age: 11 to 16
- Enrolment: 846 as of October 2023
- Website: http://www.johnspence.org.uk/

John Spence Community High School (formerly Preston High School) is a co-educational secondary school located in Preston (near North Shields) in Tyne and Wear, England.

Previously a foundation school administered by North Tyneside Council, in November 2023 John Spence Community High School converted to academy status. The school is now sponsored by the Pele Trust.

John Spence Community High School offers GCSEs and vocational qualifications as programmes of study for pupils. The school was also awarded specialist Sports College status in 2001 and continues to offer sports as a specialism. The school also offers adult education courses through the North Tyneside Adult Learning Alliance.

The school choir featured on old boy Sam Fender's 2026 cover of You Can't Always Get What You Want, used in the 2026 John Lewis Christmas advert.

== Notable former pupils ==
- Sam Fender (Musician and Brit Award winner)
- Henry Fieldson (professional footballer)
- Ben Hemsley (musician and DJ)
- Sean Longstaff (professional footballer)
- Matty Longstaff (professional footballer)
- Lewis Cass (footballer) (professional footballer)
- Stephen Murray (former BMX dirt rider)
- Matthew Parr (Olympic figure skater)
- Michael Spellman (footballer) (Professional footballer for Newport County FC)
- Sam Iduorobo

(Singer on Spotify)
