= Y Radio =

Coordinates: 55.0096°N 1.4474°W

Y Radio (YRadio.co.uk)
Programming
- Format: Mixture of news/music/community programming

Ownership
- Owner: YMCA Shareholders

History
- First air date: 2009

'Y Radio' was a community-based specialist interest radio service for North Tyneside, which broadcasts online at www.yradio.co.uk and is operated from the YMCA North Tyneside building in Church Way, North Shields. The station features community arts programmes, music programmes and local news and current affairs programmes specifically for the region and wider afield. Originally named Youth Voice FM and operated as part of the VODA scheme, Y Radio is now licensed and regulated.

== History 2009-2012 ==
Y Radio first began as Youth Voice FM in 2009 as part of the VODA scheme. At this time current presenter Daniel Fawcus took part in the broadcasts, which were originally designed to meet the schemes needs and wishes, and didn't extend much further than those sessions.

In January 2010 Y Radio was given an official relaunch by then station manager Laura Robertson and the original www.yradio.co.uk site was born. The station established a series of 8 programmes with topics from Football to Politics and involved local councillors in the area, students and amateur radio presenters. During this time the programmes received a moderate amount of attention and the station also launched an accompanying magazine which was distributed in the area.

In April 2011 the station received another relaunch, with the majority of programmes being either relaunched or re-branded and a massive recruitment drive for presenters being initiated by current station manager Steven Hesse. Steven also relaunched the Y Radio.co.uk with a new mock up and design and went about organising a weekly newsletter informing people of the station's progress.

Steven was also responsible for launching the Multimedia/Review sections of the website which focus on written and video reviews of albums, events, films and games. This gives the presenters a chance to expand on their Journalism skills and review their favourites in more detail.

About 30 volunteers currently produce and broadcast 35 hours of quality programmes each week from the studios. Shows include The Steven Hesse Show, Game On, Noise Up, Game On, The Film Space, THAT Volunteer Show, The Hepple Show and Stuart Smiles Car Show.

Y Radio also operates its own YouTube channel (YRadioNE) which features an assortment of video interviews from both in and out of the studio with local, national and international musicians.

A Game On newsletter/magazine supplement is also in development and was launched in February 2012

In Feb 2013 YMCA North Shields took the decision not to renew the contracts of the volunteers who were working on Y Radio and, as a result, the station ceased to be from March 2013. In the months leading up to this decision, volunteer recruitment had been harder, due to an accident suffered by Station Manager Hesse.

== The Graveyard Shift ==
One of the more original shows on the schedule is The Graveyard Shift, a show presented by Wayne Madden (once a producer at the former UTV Talk107), which is a Hard Rock and Heavy Metal show containing news, views, interviews and reviews from the scene both locally and further afield.

It is the only show on Y Radio to remain unchanged since January 2010 (when it was first broadcast) and has featured both collaborations with festivals like The Damnation Festival and Sonisphere as well as interviews with bands like Trivium, Black Dahlia Murder, Alter Bridge, Theory Of A Deadman and In Flames

== Staff ==
- Station Manager - Steven Hesselwood (Hesse)
- Community Liaison - Bruce Robertson
- Press Officer - Wayne Madden
- Michael Hepple - Shadow Board Representative

The station is managed by the YMCA North Tyneside.

== Advertising ==
Unlike most commercial stations Y Radio does not currently play any advertisements in keeping with its mission to provide as much informative content as possible.
