= Norham High School =

Location
- Alnwick Avenue; North Shields; Tyne and Wear, NE29 7BU; England
- Coordinates: 55.00592°N 1.47363°W

Information
- Type: Foundation school
- Local authority: North Tyneside
- Department for Education URN: 108628 Tables
- Ofsted: Reports
- Headteacher: Terry Conway
- Gender: Coeducational
- Age: 11 to 16
- Enrolment: 343 as of January 2023
- Website: http://www.norhamhigh.com/

Norham High School is a coeducational secondary school located in North Shields, Tyne and Wear, England.

It is a foundation school administered by North Tyneside Metropolitan Borough Council, and offers GCSEs, BTECs and Cambridge Nationals as programmes of study for pupils.

== Notable former pupils ==
- Shaun Prendergast, actor
- Michael Thomas, linguist
