= Merivale (surname) =

Merivale is a surname, and may refer to:

- Charles Merivale (1808–1893), English historian and churchman
- Herman Merivale (1806–1874), English civil servant and historian
- Herman Charles Merivale (1839–1906), English dramatist and poet, son of Herman Merivale
- John Merivale (1917–1990), Canadian-British theatre actor
- John Herman Merivale (1779–1844), English barrister and man of letters
- Philip Merivale (1886–1946), English actor and screenwriter
- Sir Henry Merrivale, fictional detective created by John Dickson Carr
