= Merrivale =

Merrivale is a placename:

South Africa

- Merrivale, KwaZulu-Natal is a small town in the midlands of KwaZulu-Natal Province
- Merrivale, Gauteng was a small gold mining town in Gauteng but now a military facility.
- Merrivale, Durban is a suburb of Durban

United Kingdom

- Merrivale, Devon, hamlet with nearby neolithic stone rows (formerly also spelled Merivale)
- Merrivale, Herefordshire, a suburb of Ross-on-Wye

== See also ==
- Merivale (disambiguation)
- Merivale (surname)
