= Ernest Brutton =

English cricketer & England international rugby union player

- Born: Ernest Bartholomew Brutton; 29 July 1864 Tynemouth, England
- Died: 19 April 1922 (aged 57) Aylesbeare, England
- School: Durham School
- University: Jesus College, Cambridge
- Notable relative(s): Septimus Brutton (brother); Charles Brutton (nephew)
- Occupation: priest

Rugby union career
- Position: Three-quarter
Amateur team(s)
Years	Team	Apps	(Points)
- Cambridge University R.U.F.C.
International career
Years	Team	Apps	(Points)
1886	England	1	(0)

Ernest Bartholomew Brutton (29 July 1864 – 19 April 1922) was an English rugby union three-quarter and cricketer. Button played club rugby for Cambridge University R.U.F.C., and played a single international rugby match for England.

== Personal history ==
Brutton was born in Tynemouth, Northumberland in 1864 to Thomas Brutton, the Vicar and Rural Dean of Tynemouth. He was educated at Durham School before matriculating to Jesus College, Cambridge in 1883. He was awarded his BA in 1886, and his MA in 1890. While at Cambridge, Brutton joined several sporting clubs and won four sporting 'Blues', three in rugby and one in athletics.

In 1888, Brutton was ordained a deacon and a year later was ordained a priest at Bath and Wells. He took up the post of Curate of Batcombe in Somerset in 1888 and in 1890 became Assistant Master at Lancing School. in 1891 he was Curate of Allerton in Lancashire before taking up a last position as the Vicar of Aylesbeare in Devon, a post he held from 1893 to 1922.

His only son, Eric West Brutton, was killed in action during the First World War.

== Rugby career ==
Brutton first came to note as a rugby player when he was selected to play for Cambridge University. Brutton played in three Varsity Matches for Cambridge against rival university Oxford. Brutton's first Varsity Match was in 1883, which was won convincingly by Oxford. Brutton missed the next year's game, but returned in 1885. Brutton finished on the winning side in his second Varsity Match in 1885, and repeated the win when Cambridge beat Oxford again in 1886.

Brutton was selected for international duty with England in the last game of the 1886 Home Nations Championship, an encounter with Scotland for the Calcutta Cup. Reginald Morrison the Scotland three-quarters, out-paced Brutton throughout the match, and England relied on their backs to cover this weakness in the team's defence. The game ended a 0–0 draw, and Brutton never represented England again.

== Bibliography ==
- Griffiths, John (1987). The Phoenix Book of International Rugby Records. London: Phoenix House. ISBN 0-460-07003-7.
