= Maryvale =

Maryvale may refer to:

== Places ==
- Maryvale, Gauteng, Johannesburg, South Africa
- Maryvale, Queensland (Livingstone), Queensland, Australia
- Maryvale, Queensland (Southern Downs Region), Queensland, Australia
- Maryvale, Toronto, Ontario, Canada, a neighbourhood in the Scarborough section of Toronto
- Maryvale, Phoenix, Arizona, United States
- Maryvale Station, a pastoral lease in the Northern Territory, Australia
- Maryvale, New South Wales, a location and old railway station in Dubbo Regional Council, New South Wales, Australia
- Maryvale, Victoria, Victoria, Australia
- Maryvale Mill, Australia's last white paper manufacturer

== Education ==
- Maryvale High School (Cheektowaga, New York), United States
- Maryvale Institute a Roman Catholic college in Birmingham, England

== See also ==
- Marievale Bird Sanctuary, Gauteng, South Africa
- Group 16 Marievale, South African commando
- Marieval, Saskatchewan, Canada
- Merivale (disambiguation)
