= Merivale =

Merivale may refer to:

- Merivale, Christchurch, suburb of Christchurch, New Zealand
- Merivale, Tauranga, suburb of Tauranga, New Zealand
- Merivale (company), Australian privately held company
- Merivale Road, Ottawa, Ontario, Canada
- Merivale, Western Australia, a locality of the Shire of Esperance

== See also ==
- Merrivale (disambiguation)
- Merivale (surname)
