= Ticehurst House Hospital =

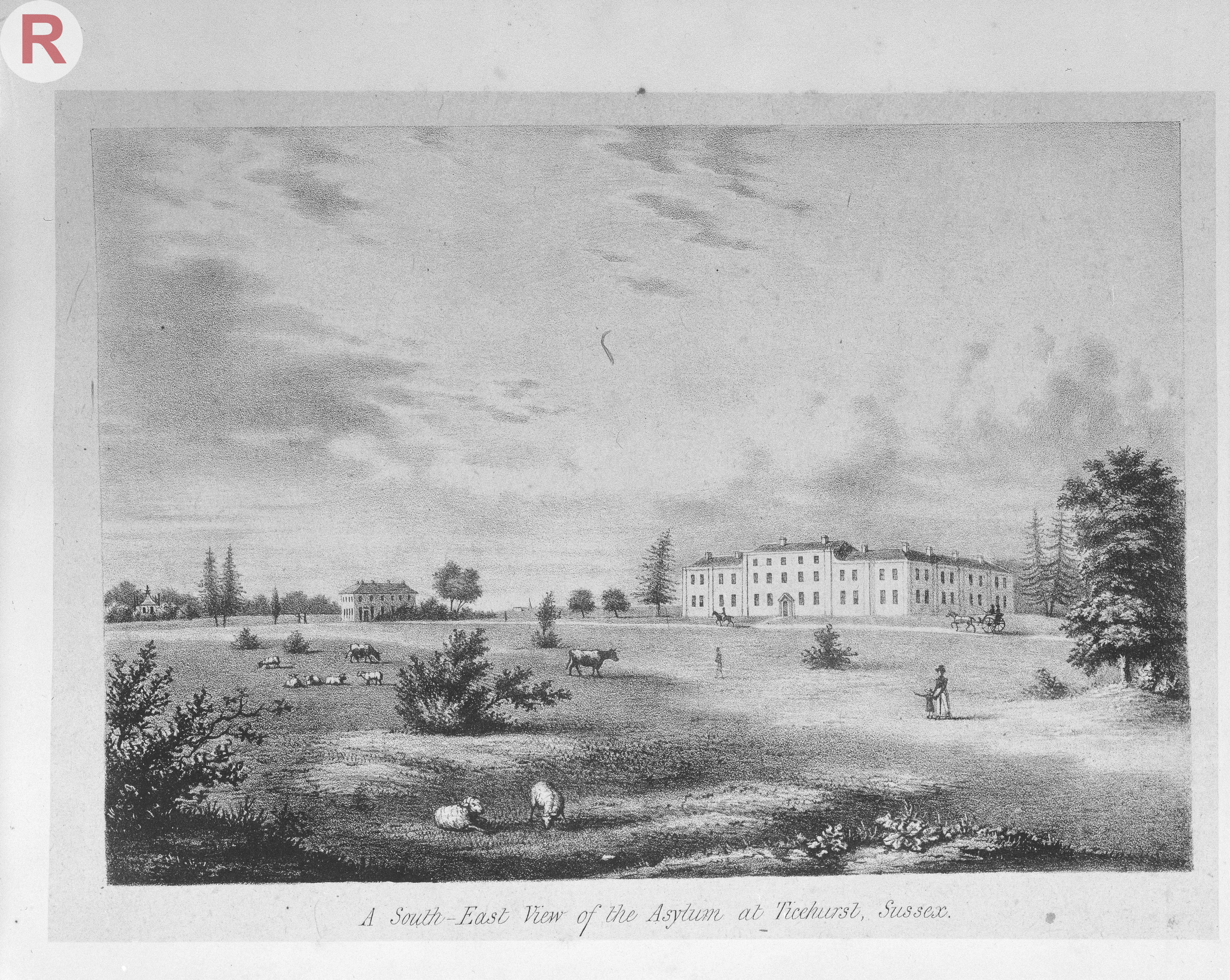
- An engraved image of the South-East View of the Asylum at Ticehurst, Sussex, c.1828-29.

- Location within East Sussex

Geography
- Location: East Sussex, England
- Coordinates: 51.0495°N 0.396°E

Organisation
- Type: Psychiatric hospital

Services
- Emergency department: No

History
- Founded: 1792

Links
- Lists: Hospitals in England

Ticehurst House Hospital was a mental health facility. It opened in 1792 and was owned and run by five generations of members of the Newington family until 1970. In 2000, the hospital name changed from Ticehurst House Hospital to The Priory Ticehurst House when it became part of the Priory Group.

== Early years ==
Samuel Newington opened a small hospital in Ticehurst, Sussex, in 1792. At first, it housed around twenty patients and admitted both poor and wealthy patients.

In 1812, Charles Newington built himself a house in the grounds. Two of his sons, Charles and Jesse, were surgeons and worked in and later ran the asylum when their father died. They employed demobilised Battle of Waterloo veterans to landscape the area surrounding the buildings.

A prospectus for the asylum was produced to show off its facilities in 1830. From 1838, only private patients were admitted and patients came from increasingly privileged backgrounds over time; by the 1850s they were 'exceptionally wealthy'.

By the 1870s, Ticehurst was considered one of the most successful and well-regarded private asylums, and by 1900 the site covered over 125 hectares.

During the 1870s, Herman Charles Merivale was a resident of Ticehurst House Hospital. He wrote of his experiences there in a book called My Experiences in a Lunatic Asylum by a Sane Person.

== Priory Hospital Ticehurst ==
Today, the hospital offers day care, outpatient, and residential treatment.

Inspections by the Care Quality Commission in September 2019 and December 2020 rated its child and adolescent wards 'inadequate.' In 2021, it began closing them, citing 'challenges in recruiting specialist permanent staff.'

== Legacy of the former private hospital ==
The Ticehurst records are unusually well-preserved; many private asylum archives have been lost, but the archive of Ticehurst covers the dates 1787-1975.

An analysis of records of more than 600 Ticehurst patients found that more than 80% of patients appeared to have symptoms that would be indicative of modern psychiatric illnesses, particularly schizophrenia and manic-depressive disorder. Another analysis argued that these conditions therefore have robust validity over time.

== Notable former residents ==
(Please only list people who are deceased and use discretion in relation to recently deceased people. See:Wikipedia:Biographies of living persons#Deceased persons, corporations, or groups of persons)

- Charles Brutton (1899–1964), English First Class cricketer
- John Bacchus Dykes (1823–1876), English clergyman and hymnwriter.
- Violet Van der Elst (1882–1966), anti-death penalty campaigner.
- Penrhyn Grant Jones (1878–1945), former Assistant Judge of the British Supreme Court for China.
- Herman Charles Merivale (1839–1906), English dramatist and poet.
- John Thomas Perceval (1803–1876), former army officer and campaigner for reform of lunacy laws.
