= Ray Slater =

English footballer

Personal information
- Full name: Raymond Slater
- Date of birth: 22 August 1931
- Place of birth: Tynemouth, England
- Date of death: October 2005 (aged 74)
- Place of death: Newcastle upon Tyne, England
- Position: Forward

Senior career*
Years	Team	Apps	(Gls)
- South Shields
1956–1957	Chesterfield	2	(1)
1957	Gateshead	6	(2)
- Blyth Spartans
Total		8	(3)
- * Club domestic league appearances and goals

Raymond Slater (22 August 1931 – October 2005) was an English professional footballer who played in the Football League as a forward.
