= Septimus Brutton =

English cricketer

Personal information
- Full name: Septimus Brutton
- Born: 26 July 1869; Tynemouth, Northumberland, England
- Died: 29 October 1933 (aged 64); Marylebone, London, England
- Batting: Right-handed
- Relatives: Charles Brutton (son); Ernest Brutton (brother)

Domestic team information
- Years: Team
- 1896–1901: Northumberland
- 1904: Hampshire

Career statistics
Competition	First-class
Matches	1
Runs scored	22
Batting average	11.00
100s/50s	–/–
Top score	15
Catches/stumpings	1/–
- Source: Cricinfo, 12 December 2009

Septimus Brutton (26 July 1869 – 29 September 1933) was an English first-class cricketer and solicitor.

Brutton born in July 1869 at Tynemouth. The son of The Reveend Thomas Brutton, and his wife, Saran Ann, he was one of nine children. A notable sibling was his brother Ernest, who himself would play first-class cricket and international rugby for England. Brutton was educated at St John's School, Leatherhead between 1880 and 1885.

Having first been recorded as playing cricket for a side representative of Northumberland as early as 1888, Brutton made his debut for Northumberland in the 1896 Minor Counties Championship against Northamptonshire. He appeared again the following season against Durham, before his next appearances in the 1901 season, in which Brutton made four appearances. Later in 1904, he made a single first-class appearance for Hampshire against Yorkshire at Portsmouth. Yorkshire made 549 in their first innings, with Hampshire being dismissed for 331 in their first innings; Brutton contributed 15 runs before he was dismissed by George Hirst. Hampshire were forced to follow-on, with Brutton scoring 7 runs before he was dismissed by Schofield Haigh, with Hampshire losing the match by an innings and 18 runs.

Brutton married Eleanor Jane Phipps on 1 September 1896 at Wakefield, Yorkshire, with the couple having two children: Charles who played first-class cricket for Hampshire on 81 occasions, and Guy, who later became a solicitor. Brutton himself was also a solicitor. After moving to Portsmouth from Wakefield, he was a partner in the solicitors firm Hobbs and Brutton by 1903. The partnership between Brutton and Edward Hobbs, which had premises in Old Portsmouth and Petersfield, lasted until 1914, when Hobbs retired from the firm. Brutton continued with the business under the same name. He continued as a solicitor until at least 1929. His wife died on 15 June 1931, with Brutton dying at Marylebone on 29 September 1933. His law firm was later taken over by his son, Guy, who ran it until 1940.
