= Charles Brutton =

English cricketer

Personal information
- Full name: Charles Phipps Brutton
- Born: 20 January 1899; Southsea, Hampshire, England
- Died: 11 May 1964 (aged 65); Ticehurst, Sussex, England
- Batting: Right-handed
- Bowling: Unknown
- Relatives: Septimus Brutton (father); Ernest Brutton (uncle)

Domestic team information
- Years: Team
- 1921–1930: Hampshire

Career statistics
Competition	First-class
Matches	82
Runs scored	2,055
Batting average	17.56
100s/50s	1/8
Top score	119*
Balls bowled	132
Wickets	0
Bowling average	–
5 wickets in innings	–
10 wickets in match	–
Best bowling	–
Catches/stumpings	36/–
- Source: Cricinfo, 23 December 2009

Charles Phipps Brutton CBE (20 January 1899 – 11 May 1964) was a soldier, Clerk of the peace, and amateur English cricketer.

The son of the cricketer Septimus Brutton, he was born at Southsea in January 1899. He was educated at Copthorne Preparatory School and Winchester College, where he played for the cricket eleven in 1916 and 1917. Brutton served in the final two years of the First World War as a second lieutenant with the Grenadier Guards. He remained in the Grenadier Guards following the war, with promotion to lieutenant in May 1919. He relinquished his commission in April 1920, retaining the rank of lieutenant.

He played first-class cricket for Hampshire, making his debut against Lancashire at Liverpool in the 1921 County Championship. He was a regular feature in the Hampshire side in 1921 and 1922, though played less matches in 1923, 1924 and 1925. He made his only first-class century in 1923 against Worcestershire, making an unbeaten 119. Brutton played more regularly for Hampshire in 1926 and 1927, after which his appearances tailed off, with three appearances in 1928, six in 1929, and just one in the 1930 County Championship. Described by Wisden as "a forceful batsman", he scored 2,052 runs in 81 matches for Hampshire, averaging 17.84, with eight half centuries alongside his lone century. His best season was in 1927, when he scored 644 runs at an average of exactly 28. Brutton also played a single first-class match for the Gentlemen in the Gentlemen v Players fixture of 1927 at The Oval, one of eight Hampshire players to take part in the match.

Following the end of his first-class career, Brutton featured in minor counties cricket for Cheshire in 1934, Denbighshire in 1935, and Dorset in 1937 and 1938. Outside of cricket, he worked as a clerk and Clerk of the Peace for Dorset County Council, a position he held for 25 years. During the Second World War, he was the Dorset County Air Raid Precautions Controller, a role for which he was made an OBE in the 1946 New Years Honours. He was made an CBE in the 1954 New Year Honours. Brutton died in Sussex at Ticehurst House Hospital in May 1964, following a long illness. His uncle, Ernest Brutton, also played first-class cricket.
