= John Herman Merivale =

18th/19th-century British barrister and man of letters

John Herman Merivale (5 August 1779 – 25 April 1844, Bedford Square) was an English barrister and man of letters.

== Life ==
He was the only son of John Merivale of Barton Place, Exeter, and Bedford Square, London, by Ann Katencamp or Katenkamp, daughter of a German merchant settled in Exeter, and was born there on 5 August 1779. The grandson of Samuel Merivale (1715–1771), tutor in a local dissenting academy in Exeter, he was brought up a presbyterian. He spent some years at St. John's College, Cambridge, but left without taking a degree. In later life he conformed to the Church of England.

On 17 December 1798 Merivale entered Lincoln's Inn, where he was called to the bar in Hilary term 1804. He practised in chancery and bankruptcy, and published Reports of Cases argued and determined in the High Court of Chancery, London, 1817–19. He sat on the Chancery Commission of 1824, in the report of which he concurred, but expounded a wider scheme of reform in A Letter to William Courtenay, Esq., on the Subject of the Chancery Commission, London, 1827.

On 2 December 1831 Merivale was appointed to a commissionership in bankruptcy, which he held until his death, on 25 April 1844. He was buried in the churchyard, Hampstead.

== Works ==
In 1811 Merivale published, for the Society for the Diffusion of Knowledge respecting the Punishment of Death and the Improvement of Prison Discipline, A Brief Statement of the Proceedings in both Houses of Parliament in the Last and Present Sessions upon the several Bills introduced with a view to the Amendment of the Criminal Law: together with a General Review of the Arguments used in the Debates upon those occasions, London. He was Robert Bland's principal collaborator in his ‘Collections from the Greek Anthology and from the Pastoral, Elegiac, and Dramatic Poets of Greece,’ London, 1813, In 1814 he published Orlando in Roncesvalles, London, a poem in ottava rima, based on the Morgante Maggiore of Luigi Pulci, and in 1820 a free translation in the same metre of the first and third cantos of Niccolò Fortiguerra's Ricciardetto.

An edition of Merivale's Poems, Original and Translated, appeared in 1838, London, 2 vols., with a continuation of James Beattie's The Minstrel, some translations from Dante, and other miscellanea. When past middle age he learned German, and shortly before his death published translations, partly reprinted from the New Monthly Magazine for 1840, of The Minor Poems of Schiller of the Second and Third Periods, London, 1844.

Merivale was a friend of Lord Byron, who praised his translations from the Greek and his Orlando in Roncesvalles. He was a frequent contributor to the Quarterly Review and other reviews and periodicals. In 1837–8 he published in the Gentleman's Magazine letters by Walter Moyle.

== Family ==
Merivale married, on 10 July 1805, Louisa Heath, daughter of Joseph Drury, by whom he had six sons and six daughters. His two eldest sons were Herman Merivale and Charles Merivale.
