= Charles Merivale =

English historian and churchman (1808–1893)

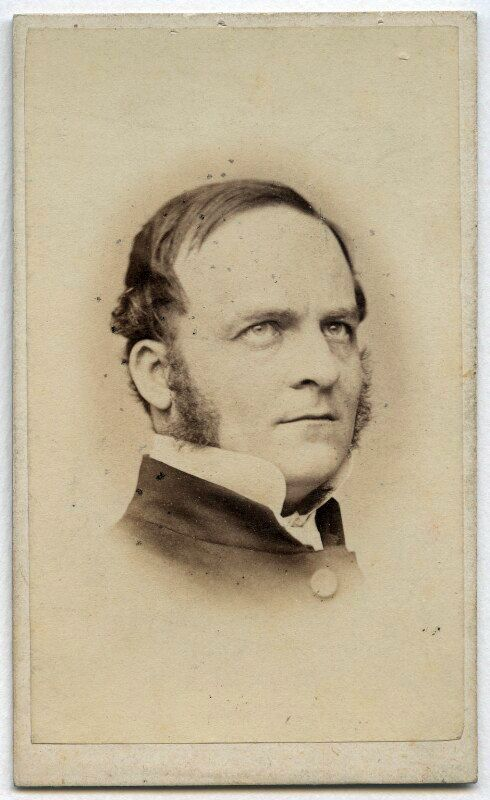
Charles Merivale by Samuel E. Poulton, albumen carte-de-visite, 1860s-1870s

Charles Merivale (8 March 1808 – 27 December 1893) was an English historian and churchman, for many years dean of Ely Cathedral. He was one of the main instigators of the inaugural Oxford and Cambridge Boat Race which took place at Henley in 1829.

== Life ==
=== Early life ===
Merivale was the second son of John Herman Merivale (1770–1844) and Louisa Heath Drury, daughter of Joseph Drury, headmaster of Harrow. He was educated at Harrow School under George Butler from 1818 to 1824, where his chief schoolfriends were Charles Wordsworth and Richard Chenevix Trench. He took part in the Eton versus Harrow cricket match in 1824. In 1824 he was offered a post in the Indian civil service, and went for a short time to Haileybury College, where he did well in Oriental languages. Deciding against an Indian career, he went up to St John's College, Cambridge in 1826. Among other distinctions he came out as fourth classic in 1830, and in 1833 was elected fellow of St John's. He was a member of the Apostles' Club, his fellow-members including Tennyson, A. H. Hallam, Monckton Milnes, W. H. Thompson, Trench and James Spedding. Merivale was the main protagonist on the Cambridge side in instigating the Oxford and Cambridge Boat Race held at Henley on Thames in 1829. He rowed at number four in the Cambridge boat in the race which Oxford won.

=== Clerical career ===
Merivale was ordained deacon in 1833 and priest in 1834 and undertook college and university work successfully. He was appointed select preacher at Whitehall in 1839. In 1848 he took the college living of St Mary's Church, Lawford, near Manningtree in Essex. He was appointed Chaplain to the Speaker of the House of Commons in 1863. In 1869, he declined the professorship of modern history at Cambridge, but in the same year accepted from Gladstone the deanery of Ely, and until his death devoted himself to the best interests of the cathedral, also receiving many honorary academical distinctions.

=== Personal life ===
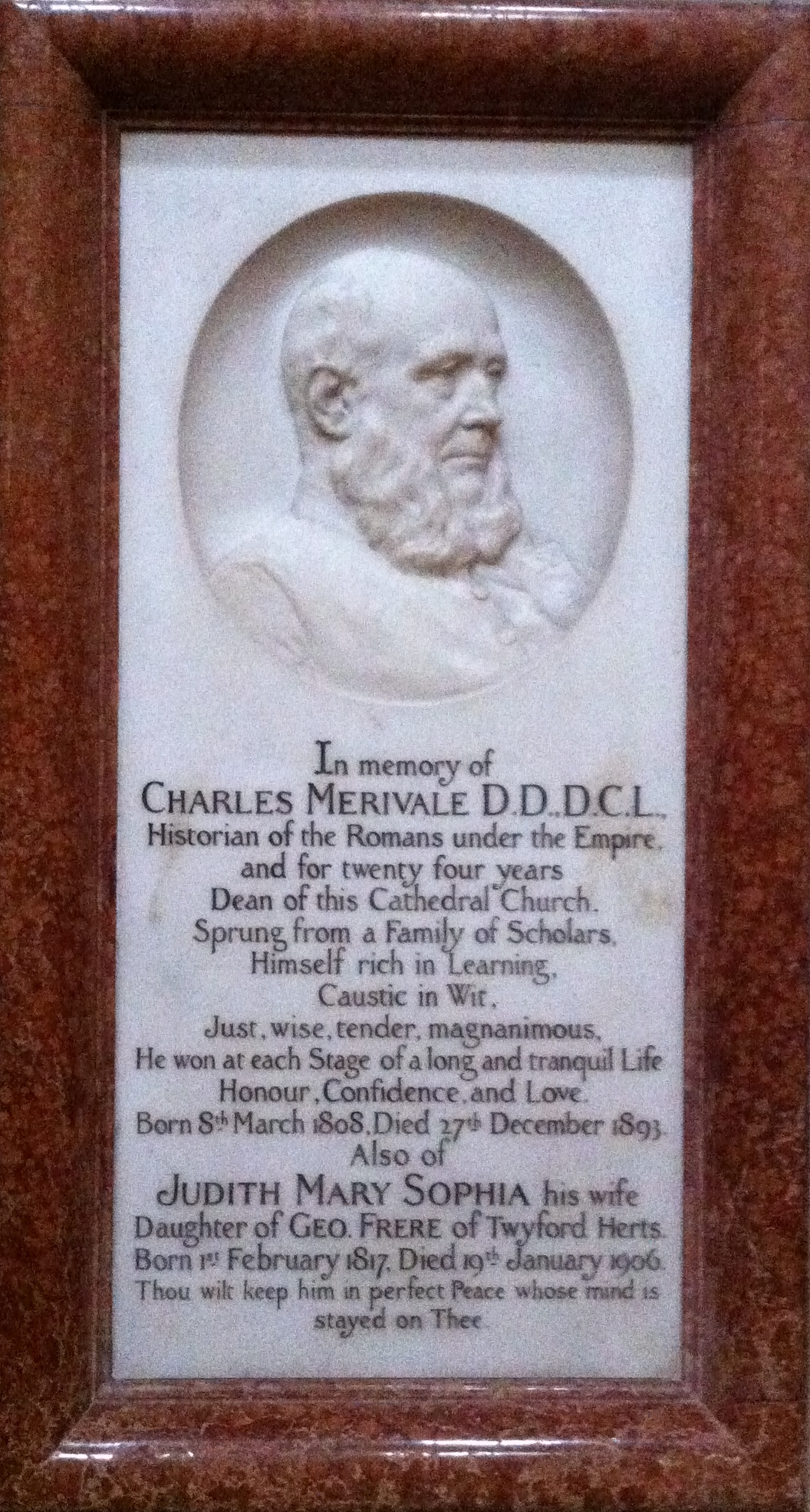
Memorial to Charles Merivale in Ely Cathedral

Merivale married Judith Mary Sophia Frere, youngest daughter of George Frere in 1850. Their son John Herman Merivale was the first English professor of mining. Their daughter Sophia Merivale was the first female councillor elected in Oxford town council in November 1907. On Thursday 9 October 1879, Merivale and his daughter Sophia spoke at the unveiling of an obelisk in Wadesmill, to commemorate the spot where Thomas Clarkson first resolved to dedicate himself to the abolition of the slave trade.

=== Death ===
Merivale died at Ely at the age of 85. There is a memorial to him in Ely Cathedral and St Mary's Church, Lawford.

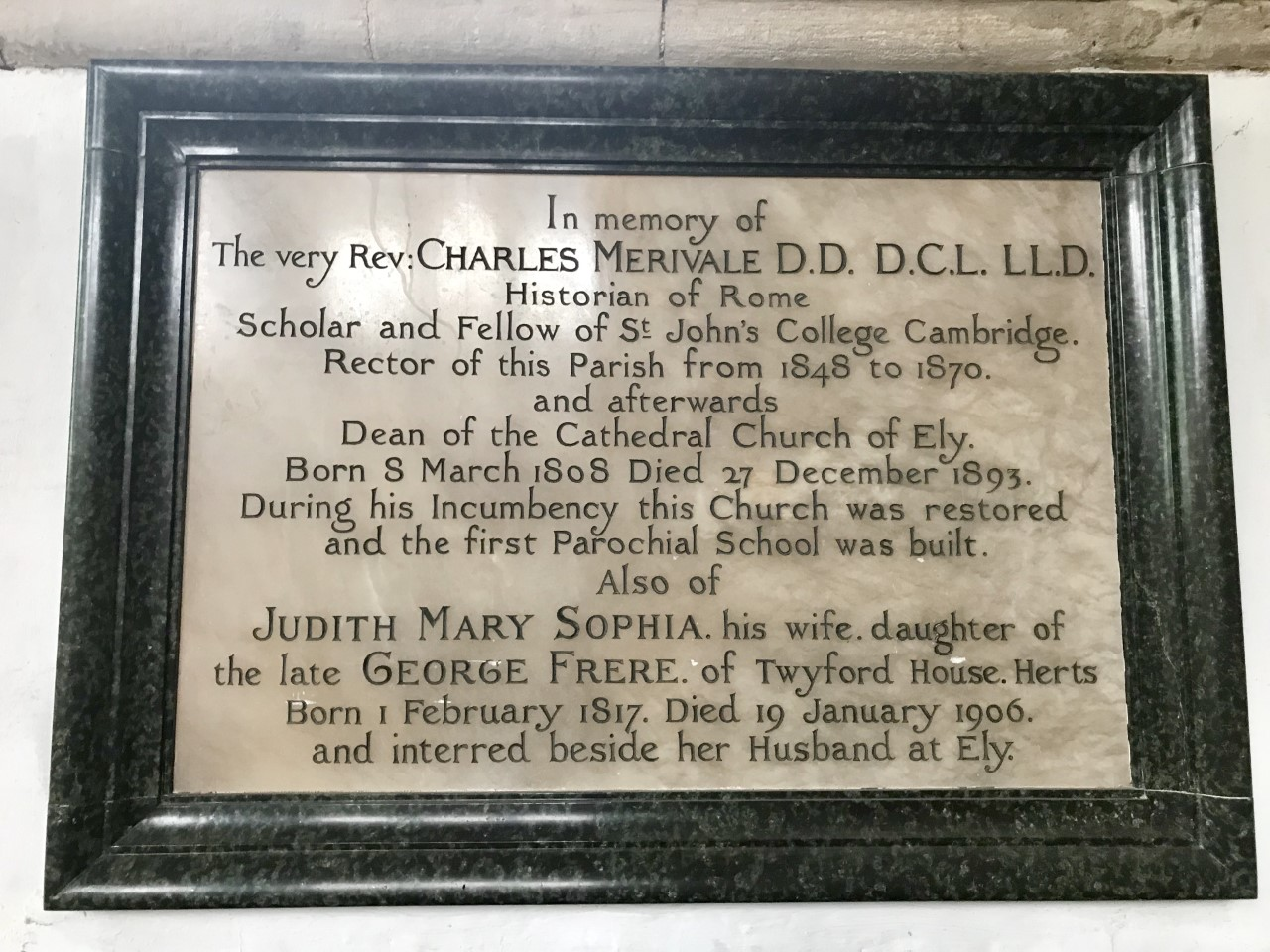
Memorial to Charles Merivale in St Mary's Church, Lawford

== Works ==
Merivale's principal work was A History of the Romans under the Empire in eight volumes, which came out between 1850 and 1862. It was intended to fill the gaps between the focus of the works by Mommsen and Gibbon. A truncated version of the beginning of this work was published in the Everyman series in an effort to complete the coverage of the history of Ancient Rome offered by that series of classics.

He condensed his treatment and expanded his scope ten years later to complete A General History of Rome from the Foundation of the City to the Fall of Augustulus (1875).

He wrote several smaller historical works like The Roman Triumvirates (1876), and published sermons, lectures, and Latin verses. His rendering of John Keats's Hyperion into Latin verse (1862) received high praise.

== See also ==
- List of Cambridge University Boat Race crews
- English translations of Homer: Charles Merivale

Church of England titles
Preceded by Harvey Goodwin	Dean of Ely; 1869–1893	Succeeded by Charles William Stubbs
