= Herman Charles Merivale =

English dramatist and poet

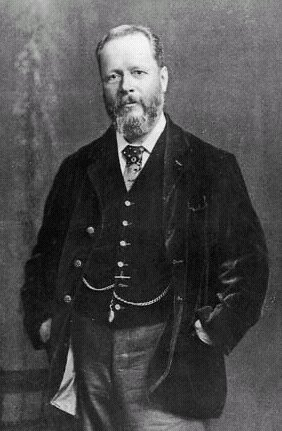
Herman Charles Merivale

Herman Charles Merivale MA (27 January 1839 – 17 August 1906) was an English dramatist and poet, son of Herman Merivale. He also used the punning pseudonym Felix Dale.

== Life ==
Herman Charles Merivale was born in London on 27 January 1839, the only son of Herman Merivale (1806–1874), a barrister and civil servant who was permanent under-secretary of the India Office, and his wife, Caroline Penelope née Robinson (d. 1881), daughter of the Revd William Villiers Robinson. Merivale was educated at Harrow School and Balliol College, Oxford, where Algernon Charles Swinburne and Charles Bowen were his contemporaries. He graduated BA in 1861. At his father's home he met many distinguished men, including Lord Robert Cecil (afterwards Prime Minister Lord Salisbury), who became a lifelong friend. His friends in literary and dramatic circles included William Makepeace Thackeray, Edward Bulwer-Lytton, Matthew Arnold, Anthony Trollope, W. S. Gilbert, Arthur Sullivan, Edmund Yates, Charles Dickens and others.

Following his father's death in 1874 he gave up the law in favour of literature and the theatre. Merivale wrote many farces and burlesques. For John Hollingshead he produced a burlesque, The Lady of Lyons Married and Settled, performed at the Gaiety Theatre (1878), and Called There and Back (1884). The Butler (1886) and The Don (1888) were both written for the actor J. L. Toole. In writing The Don, and other works, Merivale was assisted by his wife, Elizabeth, the daughter of John Pittman, whom he married in London on 13 May 1878.

During the 1870s, he was a resident of Ticehurst House Hospital after suffering depression for many years following a breakdown. He wrote of his experiences there in a book called My Experiences in a Lunatic Asylum by a Sane Patient. In 1879, on the advice of his physician, he took a long sea voyage to Australia for his health. Merivale and his wife were shipwrecked, returning to England having been rescued, to discover that the power of attorney he had left with his defalcating, trusted solicitor and trustee, Cartmell Harrison, had cost him his entire fortune.

A few years before his death Merivale became a Roman Catholic. He died suddenly of heart failure on 14 January 1906 at 69 Woodstock Road, Acton, Middlesex, and was buried in his father's grave in Brompton Cemetery. He had no children, and his widow was granted a civil-list pension of £50 in 1906.

== Works ==
- A Husband in Clover (1873), farce
- All For Her (1875), drama
- Forget Me Not (1879), drama (with Florence Crauford Grove)
- My Experience in a Lunatic Asylum, by a Sane Patient. London: Chatto and Windus (1879)
- Faucit Of Balliol (1882), novel
- The White Pilgrim (1883), drama
- Binko's Blues (1884)
- Florien (1884), drama
- The Butler (1886), drama
- The Don (1888)
- A Life of Thackeray (1891) biography, with Frank T. Marzials
- The Lady of Lyons Married and Settled, Victorian burlesque of The Lady of Lyons
- Peacock's Holiday, farce
- A Son of the Soil, drama
- Bar, Stage and Platform, autobiographical memories (1902)
