= Tynemouth =

Town in Tyne and Wear, England

- Town
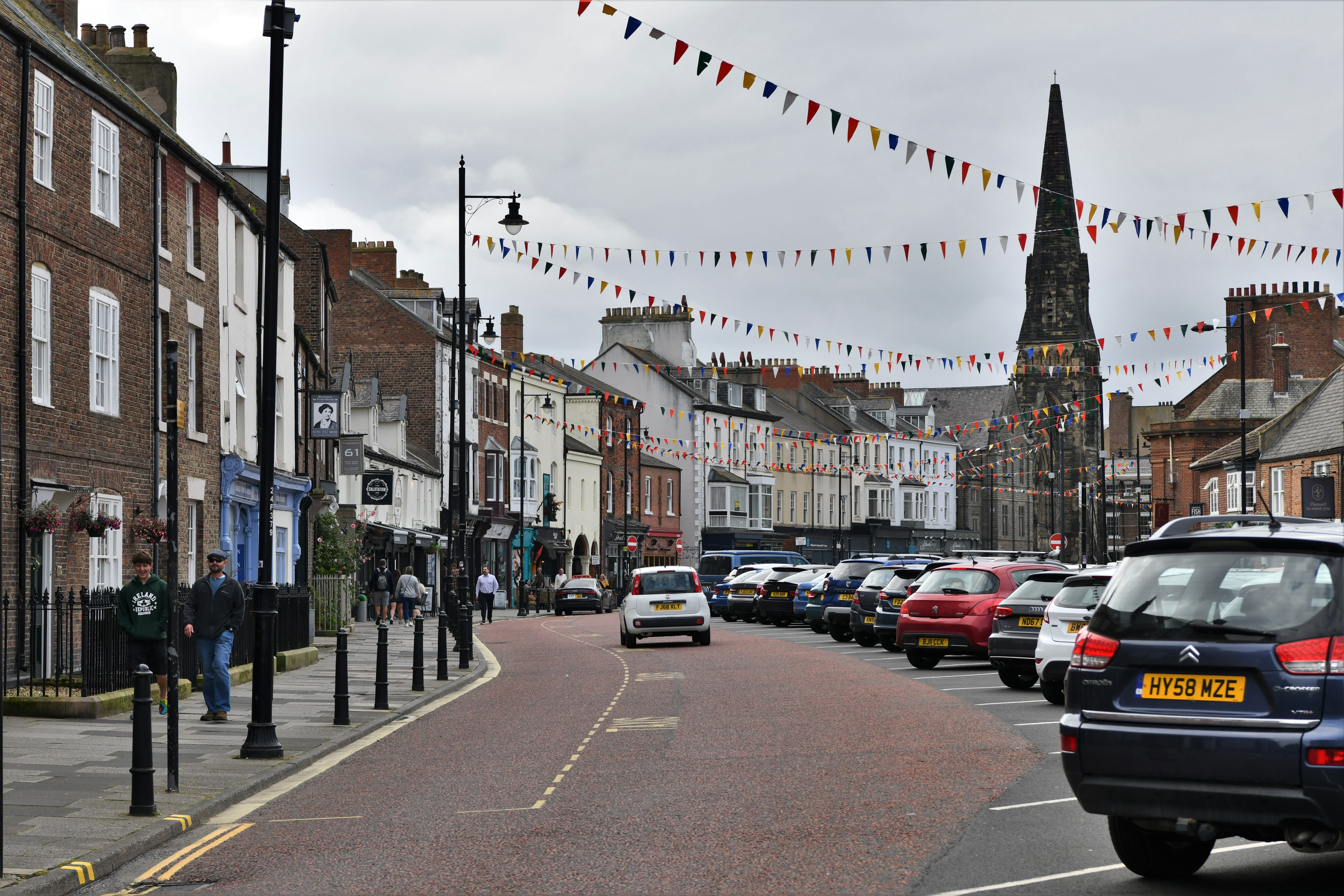
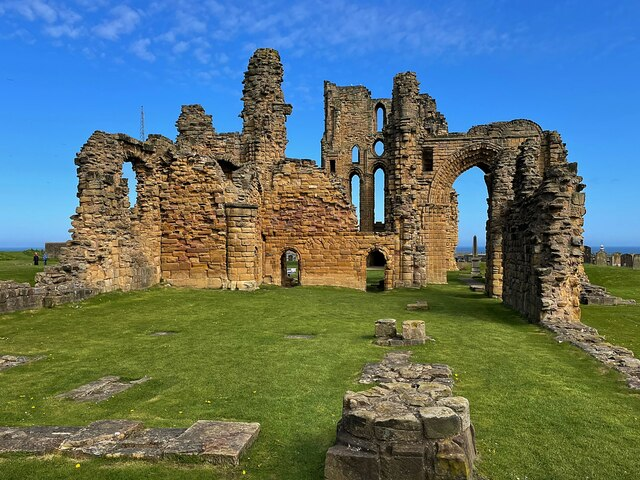
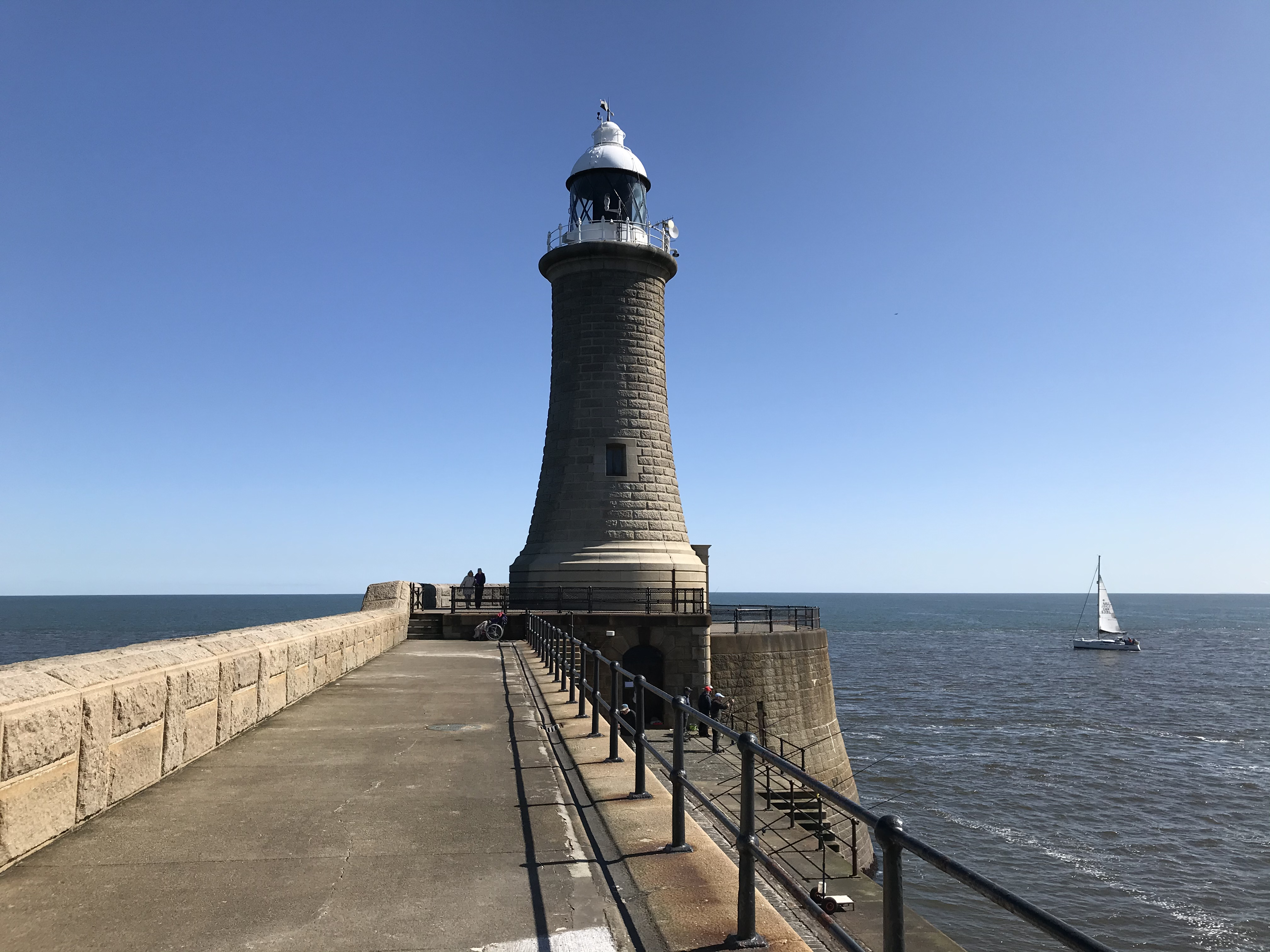
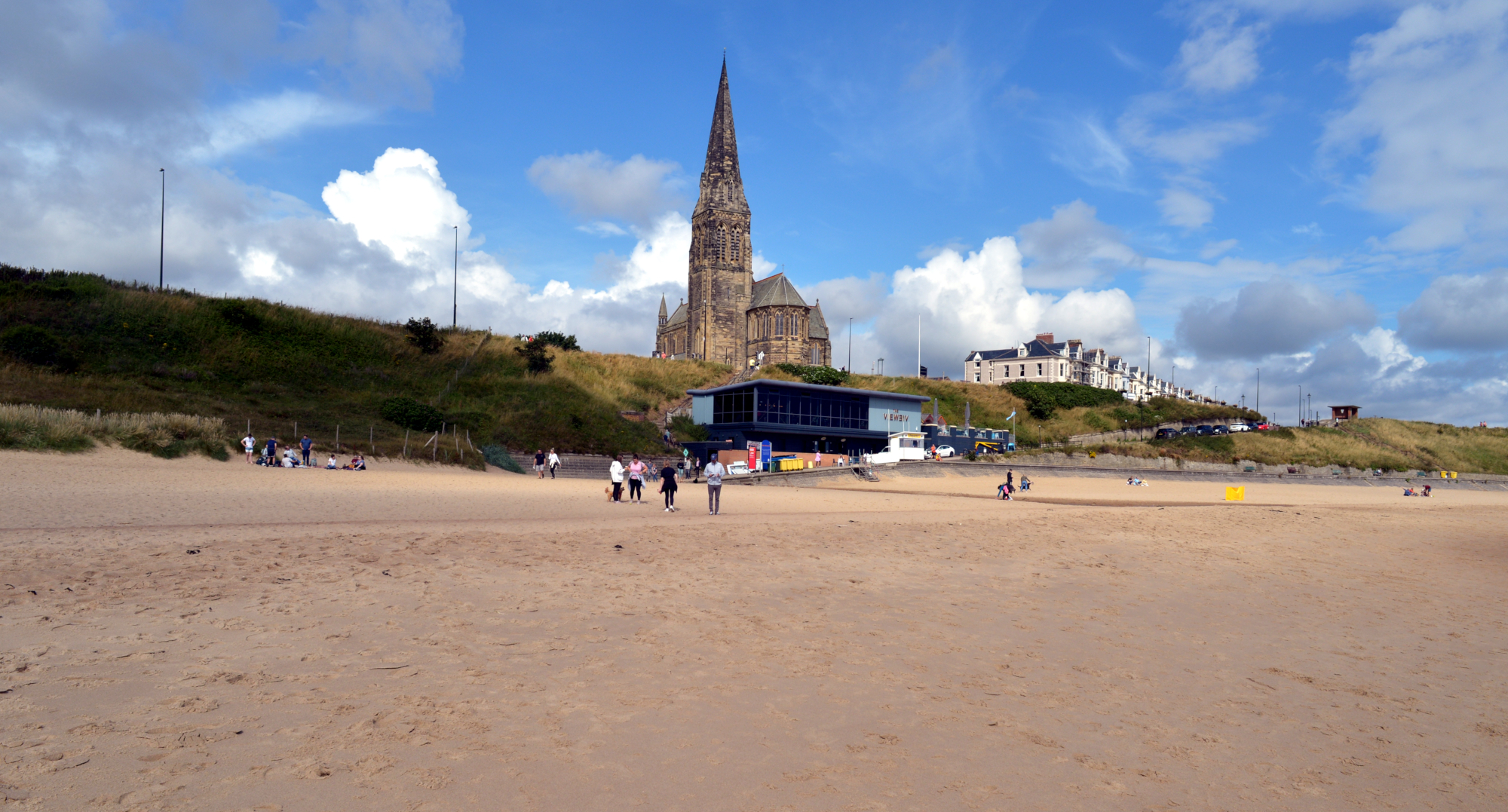
- Front Street Priory Lighthouse Long Sands

- Location within Tyne and Wear
- Population: 60,605 (Built-up area, 2021)
- OS grid reference: NZ367694
- Metropolitan borough: North Tyneside
- Metropolitan county: Tyne and Wear
- Region: North East
- Country: England
- Sovereign state: United Kingdom
- Post town: North Shields
- Postcode district: NE30
- Dialling code: 0191
- Police: Northumbria
- Fire: Tyne and Wear
- Ambulance: North East
- UK Parliament: Tynemouth

Tynemouth (/ˈtaɪnmaʊθ/) is a coastal town in the metropolitan borough of North Tyneside, in Tyne and Wear, England. Historically the easternmost town in Northumberland, it is located on the north side of the mouth of the River Tyne, hence its name. It is eight miles (13 kilometres) east-northeast of Newcastle upon Tyne. The medieval Tynemouth Priory and Castle stand on a headland overlooking both the mouth of the river and the North Sea, with the town centre lying immediately west of the headland.

Until 1974, the town was a county borough which included the nearby town of North Shields.

At the 2021 census the Tynemouth built-up area as defined by the Office for National Statistics (which also includes North Shields) had a population of 60,605. The population of Tynemouth itself at the 2021 census was 10,256.

== History ==
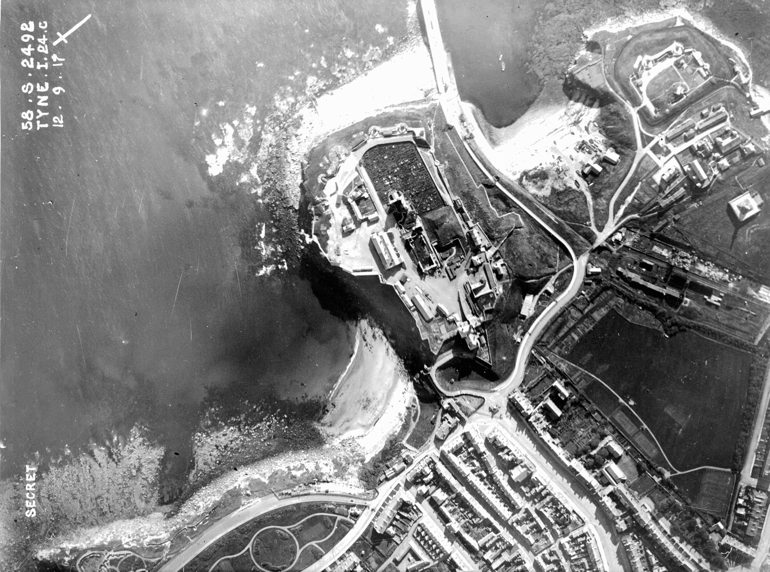
An aerial shot of Tynemouth Castle, taken in 1917, which was a major coastal fortress and the control centre of the Tyne defences, which stretched from Sunderland to Blyth.

The headland towering over the mouth of the River Tyne has been settled since the Iron Age. The Romans may have occupied it as a signal station, though it is just north of the Hadrian's Wall frontier (the Roman fort and supply depot of Arbeia stands almost opposite it on the southern headland of the Tyne). In the 7th century a monastery was built in Tynemouth and later fortified. The headland was known as Pen Bal Crag.

The place where now stands the Monastery of Tynemouth was anciently called by the Saxons Benebalcrag

— John Leland at the time of Henry VIII

The monastery was sacked by the Danes in 800, rebuilt, and destroyed again in 875 when Vikings under Halfdan Ragnarsson sailed into the River Tyne and sacked monasteries at Tynemouth and Jarrow, before setting up camp at Gateshead. However by 1083 it was again operational.

Three kings are reported to have been buried within the monastery: Oswin, King of Deira (651); Osred II, King of Northumbria (792); and, for a time, Malcolm III, King of Scots (1093). Three crowns still adorn the North Tyneside coat of arms. (North Tyneside Council, 1990).

The queens of Edward I and Edward II stayed in the castle and priory while their husbands were campaigning in Scotland. King Edward III considered it to be one of the strongest castles in the Northern Marches. After the Battle of Bannockburn in 1314, Edward II fled from Tynemouth by ship.

A village had long been established in the shelter of the fortified priory and, around 1325, the prior built a port for fishing and trading. This led to a dispute between Tynemouth and the more powerful Newcastle over shipping rights on the Tyne, which continued for centuries.

Prince Rupert of the Rhine landed at Tynemouth in August 1642 on his way to fight in the English Civil War.

Tynemouth was an ancient parish. It was divided into eight townships, being Chirton, Cullercoats, Monkseaton, Murton, North Shields, Preston, Whitley and a Tynemouth township covering the area around the original settlement. Such townships were also made civil parishes in 1866. In the 19th century, North Shields rapidly expanded from a small fishing village into a town, overtaking Tynemouth itself to become the largest settlement in the parish. North Shields was given improvement commissioners by the North Shields Improvement Act 1828 (9 Geo. 4. c. xxxvii) to administer the growing town; the commissioners' district covered the whole of the North Shields township and parts of the Chirton, Preston and Tynemouth townships.

In 1832 a parliamentary borough (constituency) called Tynemouth and North Shields was created, covering the whole of the townships of Tynemouth, North Shields, Chirton, Cullercoats and Preston. The same area was made a municipal borough in 1849, which was just called Tynemouth, despite North Shields being the larger settlement within the borough. The first town clerk was Thomas Carr Leitch.

The borough council based itself at Tynemouth Town Hall at the junction of Howard Street and Saville Street in North Shields, which had been built for the old North Shields improvement commissioners in 1844/5. In 1904, the borough was elevated to become a county borough, making it independent from Northumberland County Council for local government purposes, whilst remaining part of Northumberland for judicial and lieutenancy purposes. The county borough was abolished in 1974, when the area became part of North Tyneside in the new metropolitan county of Tyne and Wear.

Tynemouth was listed in the 2018 Sunday Times report on best places to live in Northern England.

== Climate ==
Tynemouth has a very moderated oceanic climate, heavily influenced by its position adjacent to the North Sea. As a result of this, summer highs are subdued and, according to the Met Office 1991–2020 data, average around 18 °C (64 °F). Due to its marine influence, winter lows especially are very mild for a Northern English location. Sunshine levels of 1551 hours per annum are in the normal range for the coastal North East, which is also true for the relatively low amount of precipitation at 608.3 millimetres (23.95 in).

Climate data for Tynemouth (1991–2020)
Month	Jan	Feb	Mar	Apr	May	Jun	Jul	Aug	Sep	Oct	Nov	Dec	Year
Record high °C (°F)	14.9 (58.8)	16.2 (61.2)	21.4 (70.5)	20.0 (68.0)	23.6 (74.5)	27.5 (81.5)	28.1 (82.6)	31.9 (89.4)	25.2 (77.4)	23.1 (73.6)	18.0 (64.4)	16.4 (61.5)	31.9 (89.4)
Mean daily maximum °C (°F)	7.4 (45.3)	7.9 (46.2)	9.3 (48.7)	10.8 (51.4)	13.3 (55.9)	16.0 (60.8)	18.4 (65.1)	18.3 (64.9)	16.2 (61.2)	13.5 (56.3)	10.0 (50.0)	7.7 (45.9)	12.4 (54.3)
Daily mean °C (°F)	5.0 (41.0)	5.2 (41.4)	6.4 (43.5)	8.0 (46.4)	10.3 (50.5)	13.1 (55.6)	15.4 (59.7)	15.4 (59.7)	13.4 (56.1)	10.6 (51.1)	7.6 (45.7)	5.2 (41.4)	9.7 (49.5)
Mean daily minimum °C (°F)	2.5 (36.5)	2.5 (36.5)	3.5 (38.3)	5.1 (41.2)	7.3 (45.1)	10.3 (50.5)	12.5 (54.5)	12.4 (54.3)	10.6 (51.1)	7.8 (46.0)	5.1 (41.2)	2.8 (37.0)	6.9 (44.4)
Record low °C (°F)	−10.0 (14.0)	−8.5 (16.7)	−8.0 (17.6)	−3.2 (26.2)	−0.3 (31.5)	2.7 (36.9)	7.0 (44.6)	5.2 (41.4)	3.1 (37.6)	−1.5 (29.3)	−7.2 (19.0)	−7.3 (18.9)	−10.0 (14.0)
Average precipitation mm (inches)	45.8 (1.80)	40.8 (1.61)	39.2 (1.54)	43.4 (1.71)	41.5 (1.63)	55.7 (2.19)	51.8 (2.04)	64.4 (2.54)	45.2 (1.78)	55.2 (2.17)	70.5 (2.78)	54.7 (2.15)	608.3 (23.95)
Average precipitation days (≥ 1.0 mm)	10.4	9.2	7.8	8.2	8.5	9.8	9.7	9.9	8.6	11.4	12.2	10.7	116.3
Mean monthly sunshine hours	63.1	85.6	123.5	160.8	200.2	185.7	187.4	174.2	141.8	103.8	68.7	56.1	1,551.1
Source 1: Met Office
Source 2: Starlings Roost Weather

== Attractions and amenities ==
=== Beaches ===
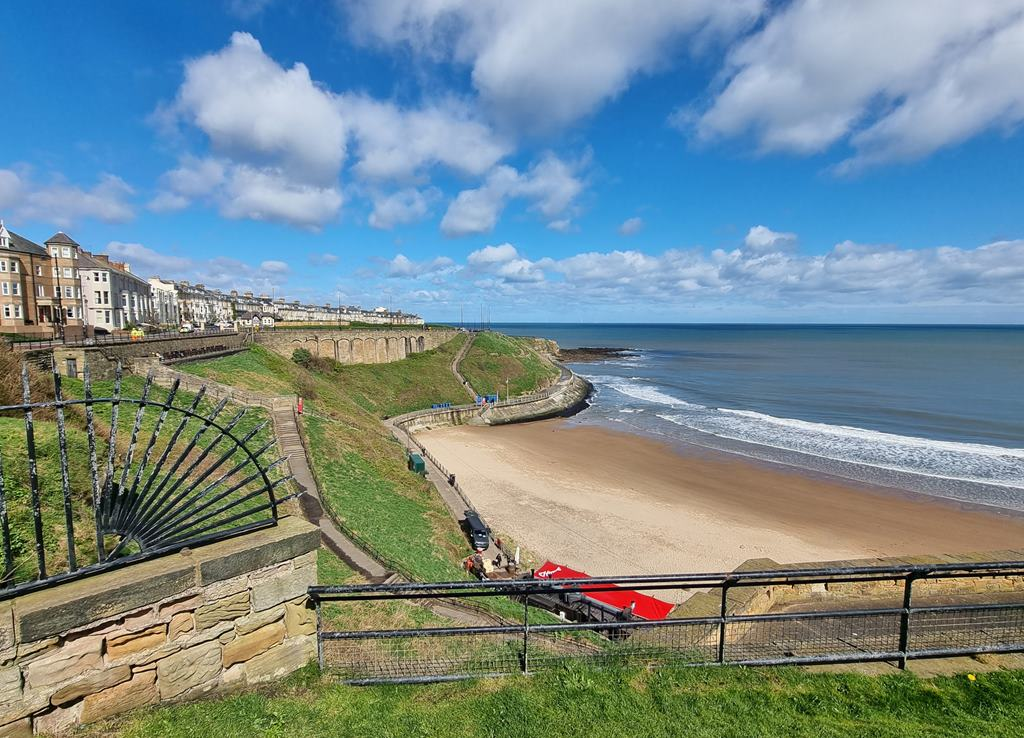
King Edward's Bay

In the late 18th century, sea-bathing from Tynemouth's east-facing beaches became fashionable. King Edward's Bay and Tynemouth Longsands are very popular with locals and tourists alike.

King Edward's Bay (possibly a reference to Edward II) is a small beach on the north side of the Priory, sheltered on three sides by cliffs and reached by stairways or, by the fit and adventurous who understand the weather and tides, over the rocks round the promontories on the north or south sides.

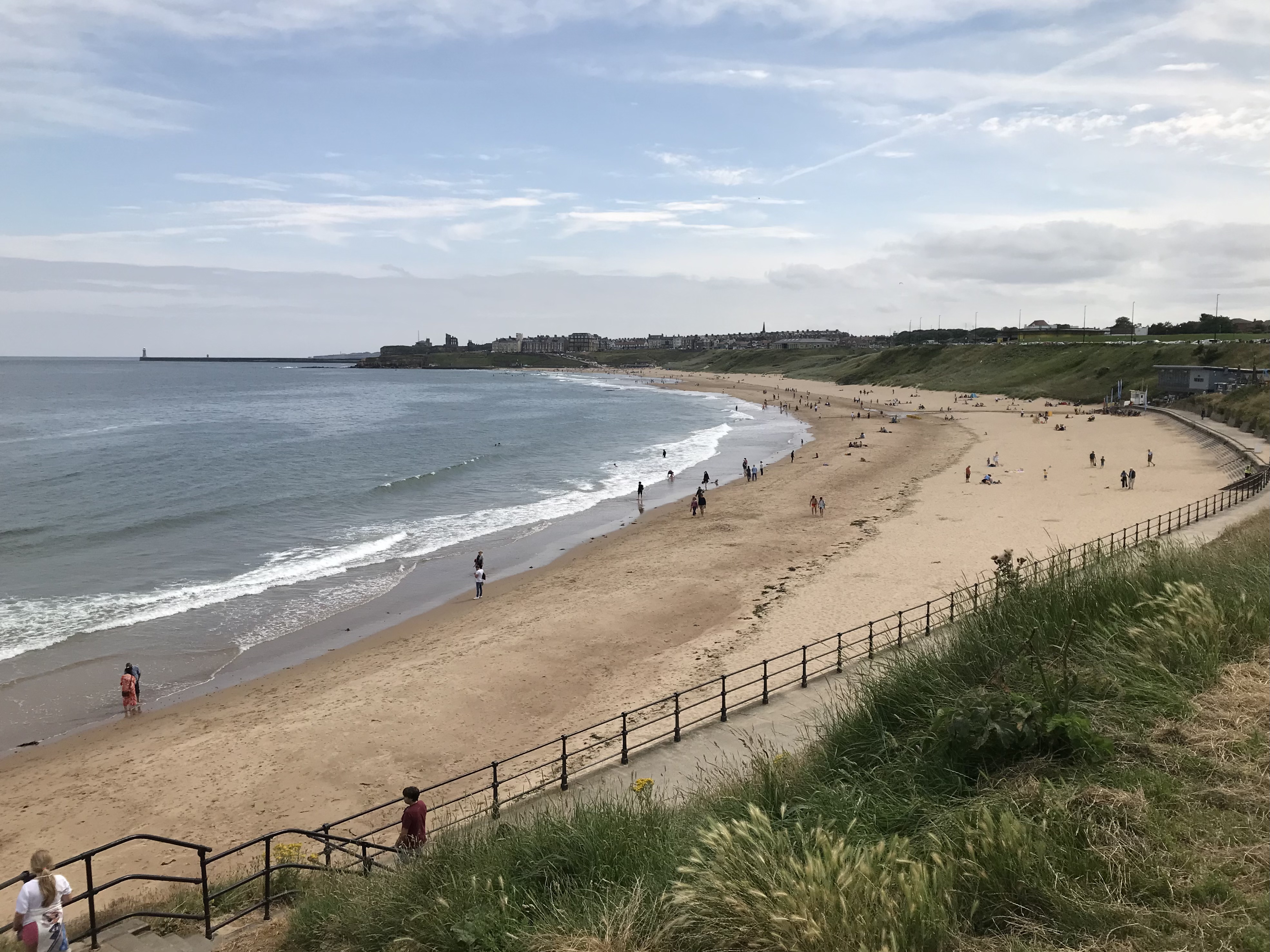
Longsands

Longsands is the next beach to the north, an expanse of fine sand 1,200 yards (1,100 metres) long, lying between the former Tynemouth outdoor swimming pool and Cullercoats to the north. The outdoor pool opened in 1925 and was considered a major tourist attraction in its heyday.

In 2013, Longsands was voted one of the best beaches in the country by users of the world's largest travel site TripAdvisor. TripAdvisor users voted the beach the UK's fourth favourite beach in its 2013 Travellers' Choice Beaches Awards. The beach was also voted the 12th best in Europe.

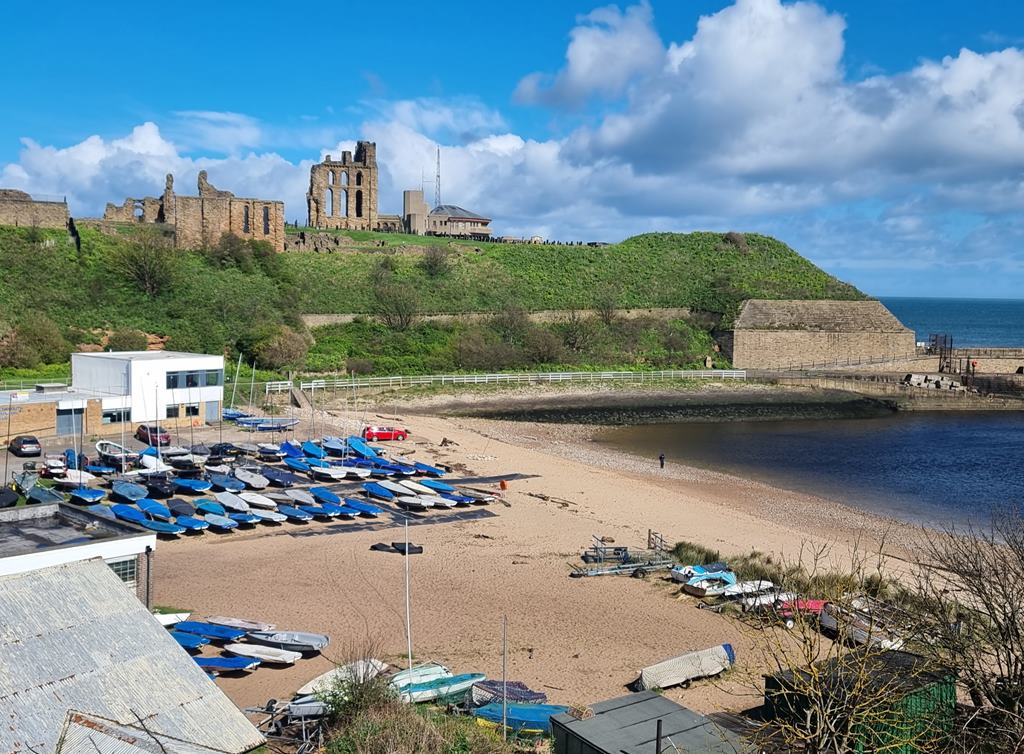
Prior's Haven

Prior's Haven is a small beach within the mouth of the Tyne, sheltered between the Priory and the Spanish Battery, with the pier access on its north side. It was popular with Victorian bathers and is now home to Tynemouth Rowing Club and the local sailing club.

=== Tynemouth Priory and Castle ===
A medieval Benedictine priory at the mouth of the Tyne. Founded in the 7th century, a castle was added around 1095. The priory was surrendered to the king during the dissolution of the monasteries in 1539. A lighthouse was built in the 1660s and it was adapted as a barracks in the 18th century. New buildings for breech-loading guns were built at the end of the 19th century. These can be seen during a visit to the site. The Priory and Castle is now run by English Heritage.

=== Front Street ===
A statue of Queen Victoria by Alfred Turner, unveiled on 25 October 1902, is situated at the edge of the village green which is home to the war memorials for the residents of Tynemouth lost during the Second Boer War of 1899–1902. Designed by A.B. Plummer, it was unveiled on 13 October 1903 by William Brodrick, 8th Viscount Midleton.

The larger central memorial is made of white granite with a cruciform column rising from between four struts in a contemporary design for its time. The front face has a relief sword and wreath carved onto it with the inscription below. The other three faces hold the honour roll for those lost during both World Wars. It was unveiled in 1923. DM O'Herlihy was named as the original designer but a press report stated that a Mr Steele designed the monument and credited O'Herlihy with preparatory works on the village green. The 82 names from World War II were added in 1999.

Tynemouth Clock Tower on Front Street was erected in 1861 by William Scott, esq., a native of the town. Designed by Oliver and Lamb with carvings by Robert Beall, the tower housed a clock by Joyce of Whitchurch. At ground level there were drinking fountains (and drinking troughs for dogs) on the north and south sides, a marine barometer (by Negretti and Zambra) to the west and an access door to the east. Made of polychrome bricks and ashlar, the tower (which has been Grade II listed since 1986) is described as being in the Venetian Gothic style.

=== Kings Priory School ===
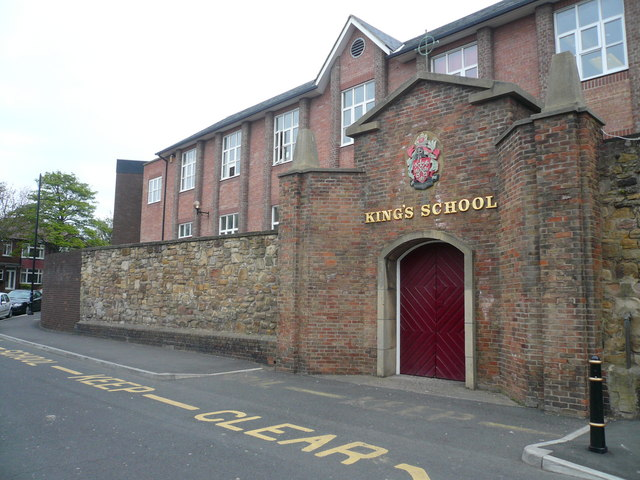
Kings Priory School

Located on Huntingdon Place, Kings Priory School (formerly The King's School and Priory Primary School) is a co-educational academy with over 800 pupils aged between 4 and 18. Though founded in Jarrow in 1860, the school moved to its present site in Tynemouth in 1865 originally providing a private education for local boys. The school has an Anglican tradition, but admits students of all faiths. Formerly a fee-paying independent school, in 2013 the school merged with the local state Priory Primary School to become a state academy.

Former King's School was named in reference to the three ancient kings buried at Tynemouth Priory: Oswin, Osred and Malcolm III. Its most famous old boy is Stan Laurel, one half of the comedy duo Laurel and Hardy. Hollywood film director Sir Ridley Scott, and racing driver Jason Plato also attended the school.

=== Tynemouth Pier and lighthouse ===
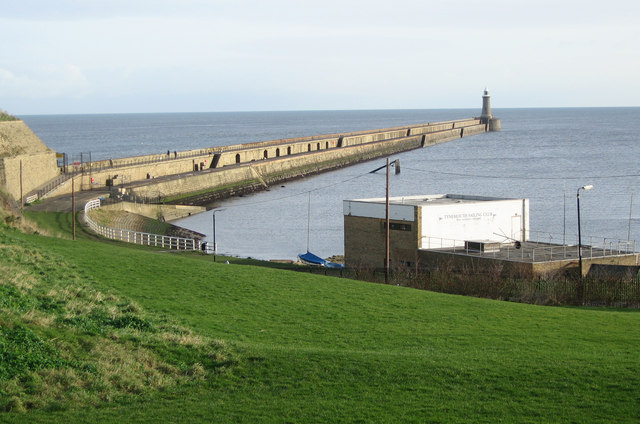
Wide view of Tynemouth pier and lighthouse

Tynemouth North Pier light
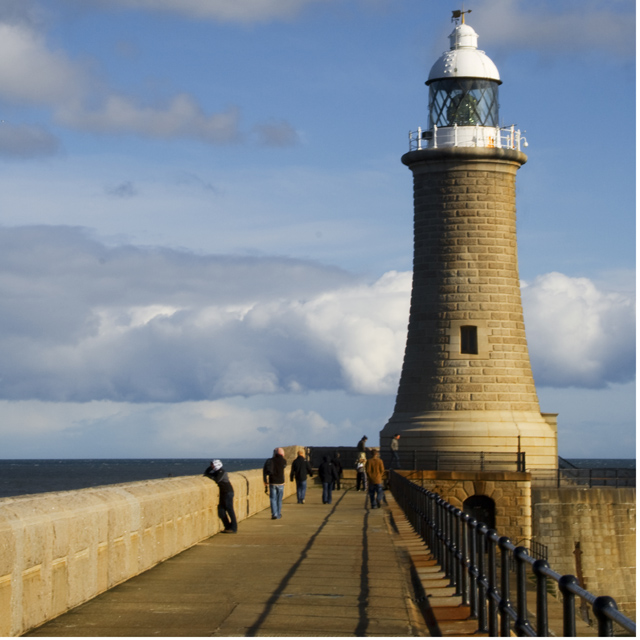
- Location: Tynemouth, North Tyneside, United Kingdom
- Coordinates: 55°00′52″N 1°24′11″W

Tower
- Constructed: 1864 (first)
- Construction: stone
- Height: 23 m (75 ft)
- Shape: tapered cylindrical tower with balcony and lantern
- Markings: Unpainted (tower), white (lantern)
- Power source: mains electricity
- Operator: Port of Tyne
- Heritage: Grade II listed building
- Fog signal: 1 blast every 10s.

Light
- First lit: 1903 (current)
- Focal height: 26 m (85 ft)
- Lens: rotating catadioptric lens (6 panels in 2 groups of 3)
- Range: 26 nmi (48 km; 30 mi)
- Characteristic: Fl(3) W 10s

This massive stone breakwater extends from the foot of the priory some 900 yards (810 metres) out to sea, protecting the northern flank of the mouth of the Tyne. It has a broad walkway on top, popular with Sunday strollers. On the lee side is a lower level rail track, formerly used by trains and cranes during the construction and maintenance of the pier. At the seaward end is a lighthouse.

The pier's construction took over 40 years (1854–1895). In 1898 the original curved design proved inadequate against a great storm and the centre section was destroyed. The pier was then rebuilt in a straighter line and completed in 1909. A companion pier at South Shields protects the southern flank of the river mouth.

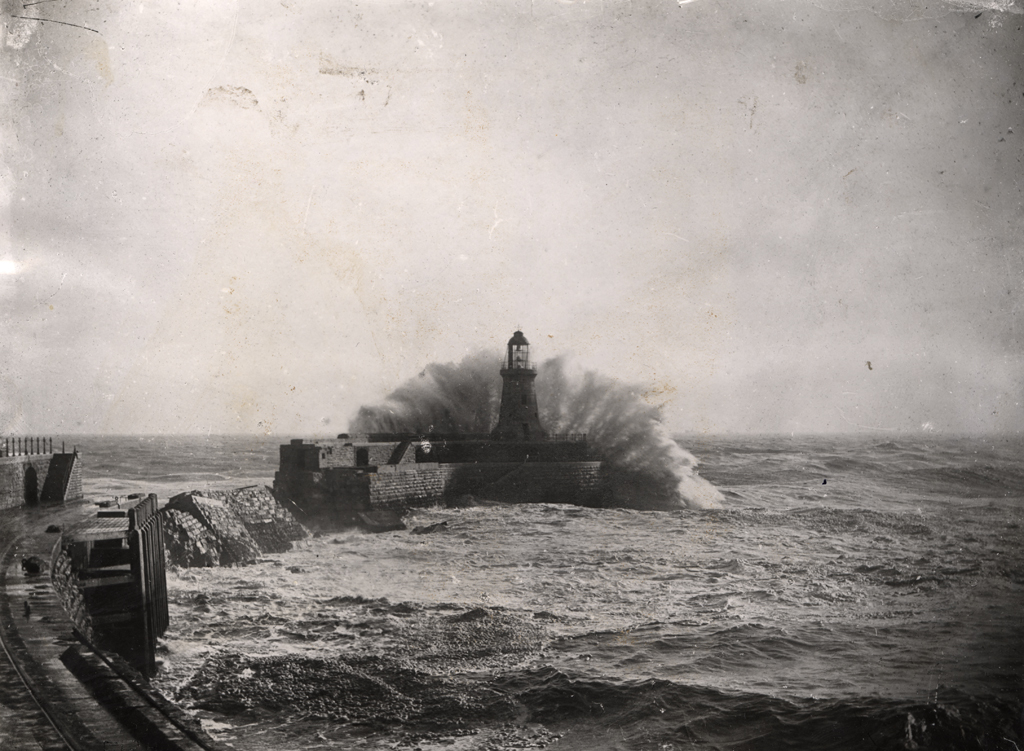
The old lighthouse and storm-damaged pier, c. 1900.

A lighthouse had built on the old North Pier (first lit in 1895, it displayed three lights mounted vertically: green over white over red, with a range of seven nautical miles or 13 kilometres); however, when the pier had to be rebuilt to a new design, an entirely new lighthouse was required. The work was undertaken by Trinity House, beginning in 1903; the lighthouse was finished before the pier itself, and was first lit on 15 January 1908. The revolving optic, manufactured by Barbier, Bénard, et Turenne, displayed a flash three times every ten seconds; it remains in use today. The light source was an incandescent oil vapour lamp, which (together with the optic) produced a 70,000-candlepower light with a range of 15 nautical miles (28 kilometres). The lighthouse was also equipped with a reed fog signal, powered by compressed air, which was mounted 'on the cupola'; it sounded one long blast every ten seconds. It was manned by four keepers, with two on duty at any one time. In September 1961 a new, more powerful electric light was installed by the Tyne Improvement Commissioners (powered from the mains). Then in 1967 the lighthouse (by then staffed by six keepers on rotation) was automated; a diesel generator was installed along with an electric foghorn.

Before the pier was built, a lighthouse stood within the grounds of Tynemouth Priory and Castle. It was demolished in 1898. It stood on the site of the now-disused Coastguard Station.

In October 2023 the pier was damaged by Storm Babet (with winds of up to 70 knots), which left 'large sections of stone walls, handrails, block paving and coping stones washed into the sea'.

=== The Spanish Battery ===
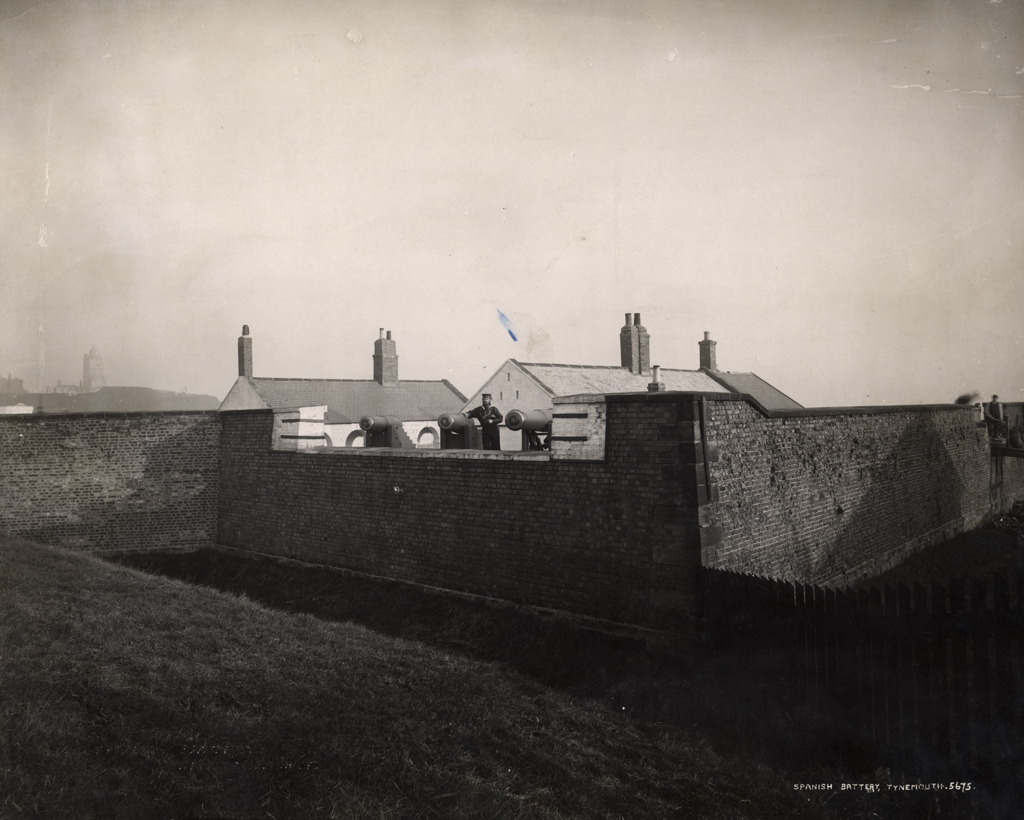
The Spanish Battery c. 1870.

The headland dominates the river mouth and is less well known as Freestone Point. Settlements dating from the Iron Age and later have been discovered here. The promontory supposedly takes its name from Spanish mercenaries who manned guns there in the 16th century to defend Henry VIII's fleet. Most of the guns had been removed by 1905. It is now a popular vantage point for watching shipping traffic on the Tyne.

=== The Collingwood Monument ===
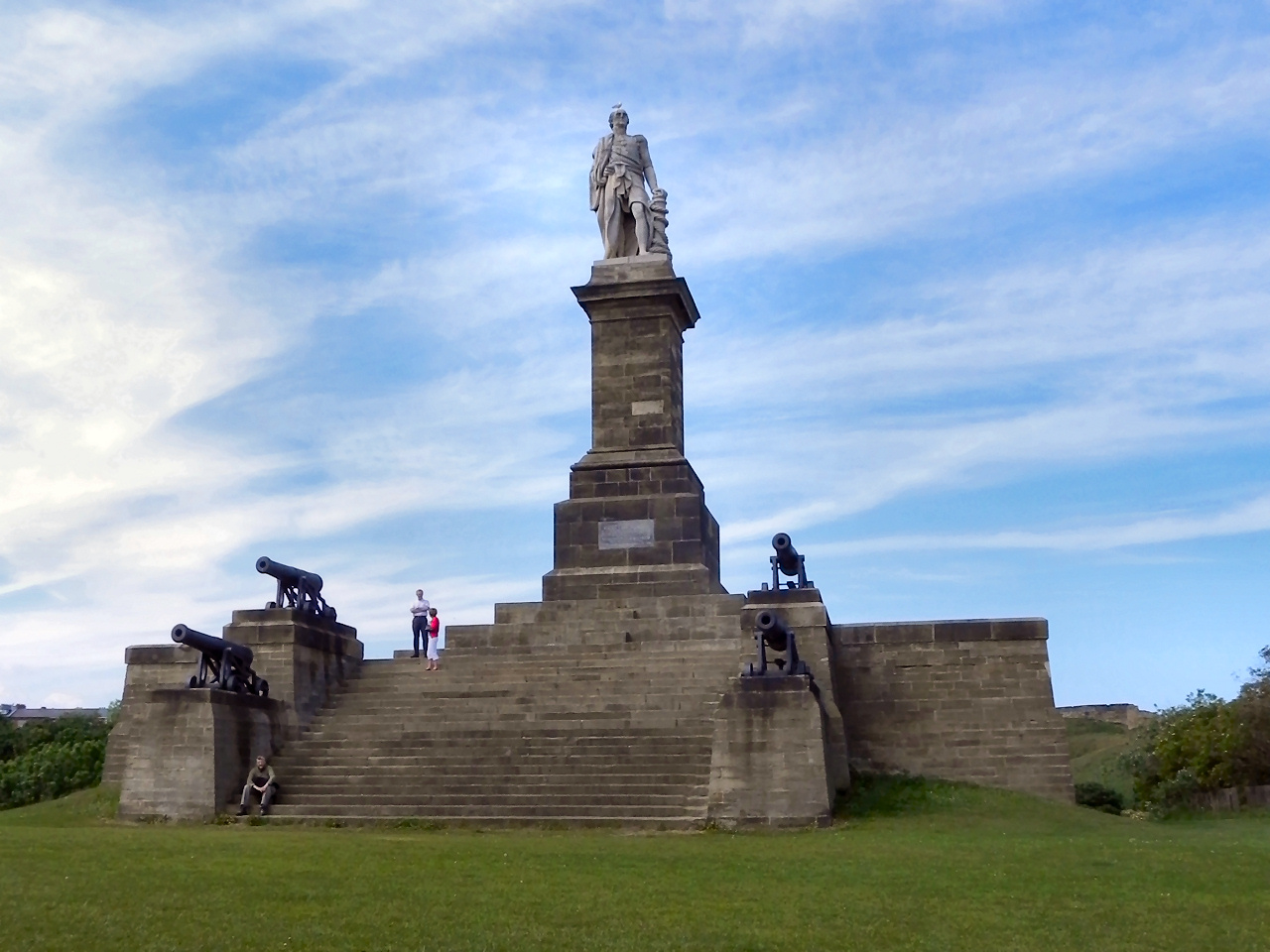
The Collingwood Monument

Beyond the Battery, and commanding the attention of all shipping on the Tyne, is the giant memorial to Lord Collingwood, the Collingwood Monument. Collingwood was Nelson's second-in-command at the Battle of Trafalgar, who completed the victory after Nelson was killed in action. Erected in 1845, the monument was designed by John Dobson and the statue was sculpted by John Graham Lough. The figure is some 23 feet (7.0 m) tall and stands on a massive base incorporating a flight of steps flanked by four cannons from HMS Royal Sovereign – Collingwood's ship at Trafalgar.

=== The Black Middens ===
These rocks in the Tyne near the monument are covered at high water, and the one rock that can sometimes be seen then is called Priors Stone. Over the centuries they have claimed many ships whose crew "switched off" after safely negotiating the river entrance. In 1864, the Middens claimed five ships in three days with many deaths, even though the wrecks were only a few yards from the shore. In response a meeting was held in North Shields Town Hall in December 1864 at which it was agreed that a body of men should be formed to assist the Coastguard in the event of such disasters. This led to the foundation of the Tynemouth Volunteer Life Brigade.

=== Tynemouth Aquarium ===
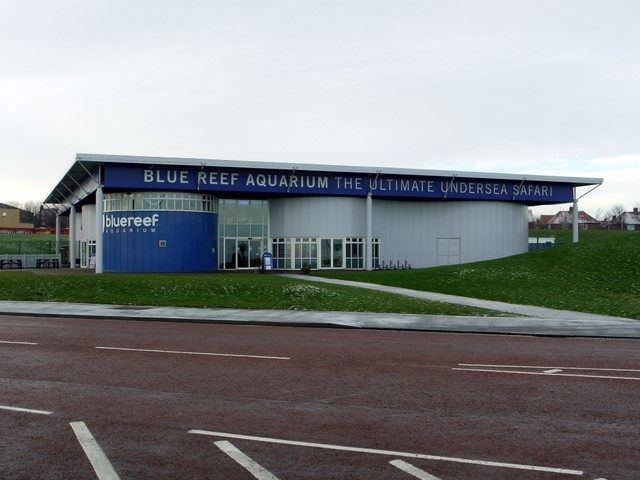
Blue Reef Aquarium

Undersea aquatic park, containing seahorses, sharks, giant octopus, frogs, otters and many other creatures. Its Seal Cove is a purpose-built outdoor facility providing an environment for a captive-bred colony of harbour seals. The 500,000-litre (110,000 imp gal) pool includes rocky haul-out areas and underwater caves, specially created to ensure marine mammals are kept in near natural conditions. It was previously known as the Blue Reef Aquarium Tynemouth.

== Transport ==
Tynemouth Metro station is a stop on the Tyne and Wear Metro; Nexus provides regular services on the Yellow line, which connects St James and South Shields, via Newcastle Central and Whitley Bay.

The station opened originally in 1882, as a main line station catering for the thousands of holiday-makers who flocked to the Tynemouth beaches. Its ornate Victorian ironwork canopies have earned it grade II listed status. They were restored in 2012 and the station now provides a venue for a weekend flea market, book fairs, craft displays, coffee shops, restaurants, exhibitions and other events.

Tynemouth is one of the end points for the 140-mile-long (225 km) Coast to Coast Cycle Route from Whitehaven or Workington, in Cumbria.

== Demographics ==
In 2011, Tynemouth had a population of 67,519, compared to 17,056 a decade earlier. This is mainly because of boundary changes rather than an actual population increase: for example, North Shields was a separate urban subdivision in 2001 and had a population of over 36,000. Shiremoor was also a different urban subdivision, with a population of almost 5000 in 2001. The 2011 definition of the town of Tynemouth includes North Shields along with some areas in the north west of the town such as Shiremoor or West Allotment. However using 2011 methodology boundaries Tynemouth had a population of 60,881 in 2001 based on the 2011 boundaries. Thus Tynemouth has become larger in both area and population.

Tynemouth compared in 2011
	Tynemouth	North Tyneside
White British	94.7%	95.1%
Asian	2.0%	1.9%
Black	0.3%	0.4%

== Religion ==
Tynemouth's parish church is the Church of the Holy Saviour in the parish of Tynemouth Priory. It was built in 1841 as a chapel of ease to the main Anglican church in the area, Christ Church, North Shields. In Front Street there were two other churches, the Catholic parish of Our Lady & St Oswin's, opened in 1899, and also Tynemouth Congregational Church, which closed in 1973 and is now a shopping arcade.

== Notable residents ==
- Harriet Martineau – sociologist and writer
- Susan Mary Auld – naval architect
- Norah Balls (1886–1980), suffragette, women’s right campaigner, magistrate and councillo, co-founder of the Girl Guides movement in Northumberland.
- Thomas Bewick – engraver, spent many holidays at Bank Top and wrote most of his memoirs there in 1822
- Septimus Brutton – played a single first-class cricket match for Hampshire in 1904
- Toby Flood – England rugby player, was a pupil at The King's School
- Ralph Pake – professional footballer
- Ray Slater - (1931–2005), professional footballer
- Andy Taylor – former lead guitarist for the new wave group Duran Duran was born in Tynemouth in 1961 at the Tynemouth Jubilee Infirmary.
- John of Tynemouth (canon lawyer) – (died 1221), Canon lawyer, author, teacher at Oxford University later canon and judge.
- John of Tynemouth (chronicler) – (fl. c. 1350), vicar of Tynemouth, author of world history and of British hagiography.
- John of Tynemouth (geometer) – (fl. early 13th century), author of a book on geometry later relied on by Adelard of Bath and Roger Bacon. Possibly the same man as the canon lawyer.

== Notable visitors ==
Charles Dickens visited Tynemouth and wrote in a letter from Newcastle, dated 4 March 1867:

We escaped to Tynemouth for a two hours' sea walk. There was a high wind blowing, and a magnificent sea running. Large vessels were being towed in and out over the stormy bar with prodigious waves breaking on it; and, spanning the restless uproar of the waters, was a quiet rainbow of transcendent beauty. the scene was quite wonderful. We were in the full enjoyment of it when a heavy sea caught us, knocked us over, and in a moment drenched us and filled even our pockets."

Giuseppe Garibaldi sailed into the mouth of the River Tyne in 1854 and briefly stayed in Huntingdon Place. The house is marked by a commemorative plaque.

Lewis Carroll states in the first surviving diary of his early manhood, that he met 'three nice little children' belonging to a Mrs Crawshay in Tynemouth on 21 August 1855. He remarks: 'I took a great fancy to Florence, the eldest, a child of very sweet manners'.

Algernon Charles Swinburne arrived hot foot from Wallington Hall in December 1862 and proceeded to accompany William Bell Scott and his guests, probably including Dante Gabriel Rossetti on a trip to Tynemouth. Scott writes that as they walked by the sea, Swinburne declaimed his Hymn to Proserpine and Laus Veneris in his strange intonation, while the waves 'were running the whole length of the long level sands towards Cullercoats and sounding like far-off acclamations'.

Peter the Great of Russia is reputed to have stayed briefly in Tynemouth while on an incognito visit to learn about shipbuilding on the Tyne. He was fascinated by shipbuilding and Western life. Standing 6 feet 8 inches (203 cm) and with body-guards, he would not have been troubled by the locals.

== Festivals ==
=== Mouth of Tyne festival ===
The Mouth of the Tyne Festival currently continues the local festival tradition. This annual free festival is held jointly between Tynemouth and South Shields and includes a world-class open-air concert at Tynemouth Priory.

=== Tynemouth pageant ===
Tynemouth Pageant is a community organisation in North Tyneside, Tyne and Wear, England, devoted to staging an open-air dramatic pageant every three years in the grounds of Tynemouth Castle and Priory, by kind permission of English Heritage who run the historic monastic and defensive site at the mouth of the River Tyne.

== Gallery ==
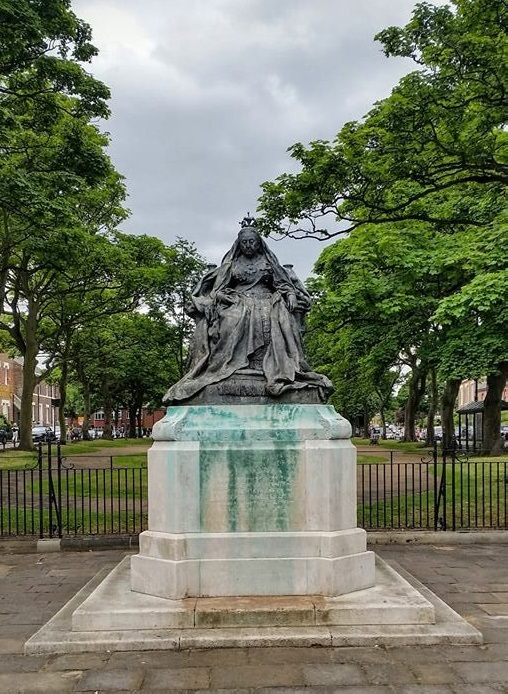
The Statue of Queen Victoria

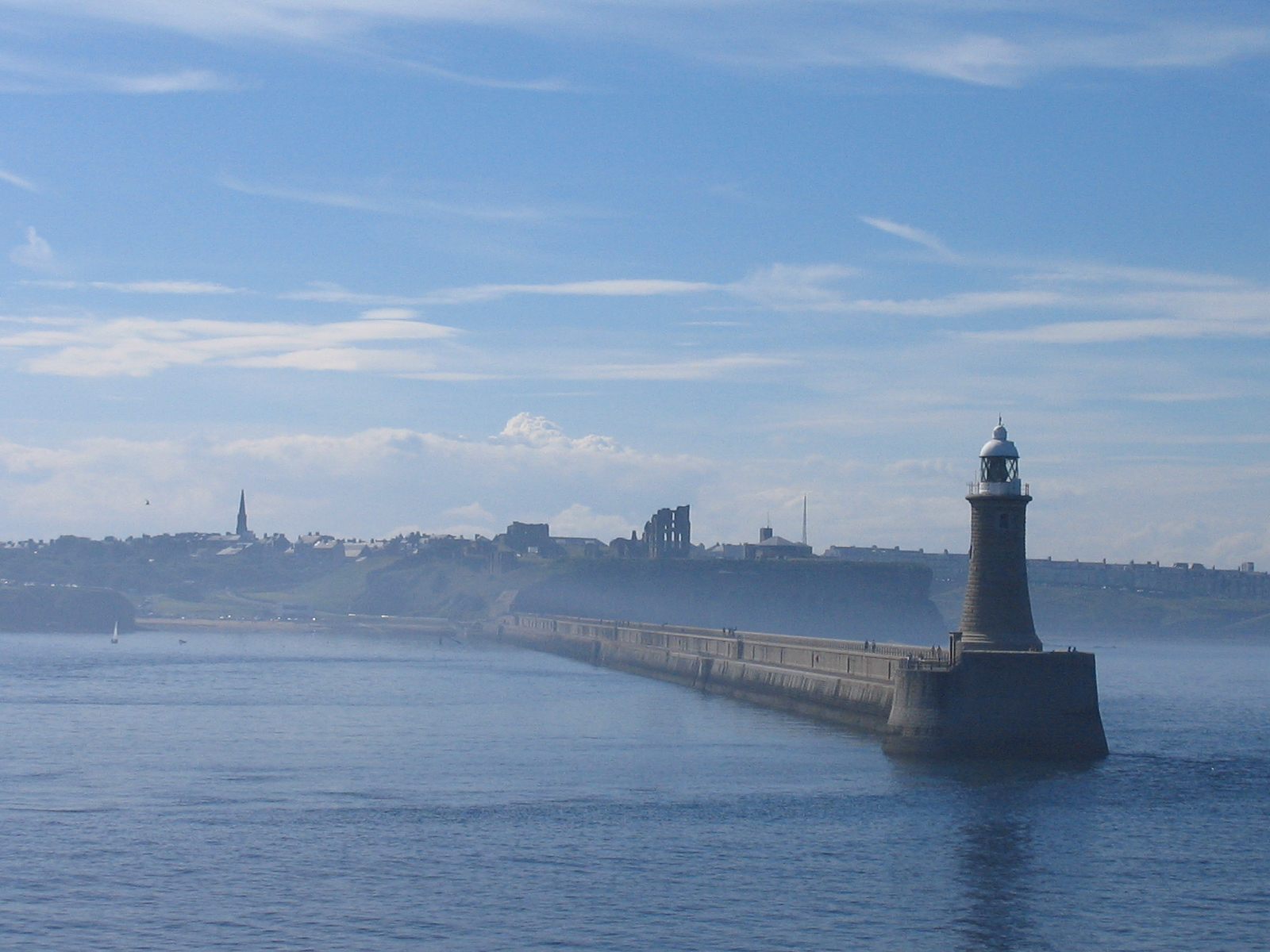
Tynemouth Pier

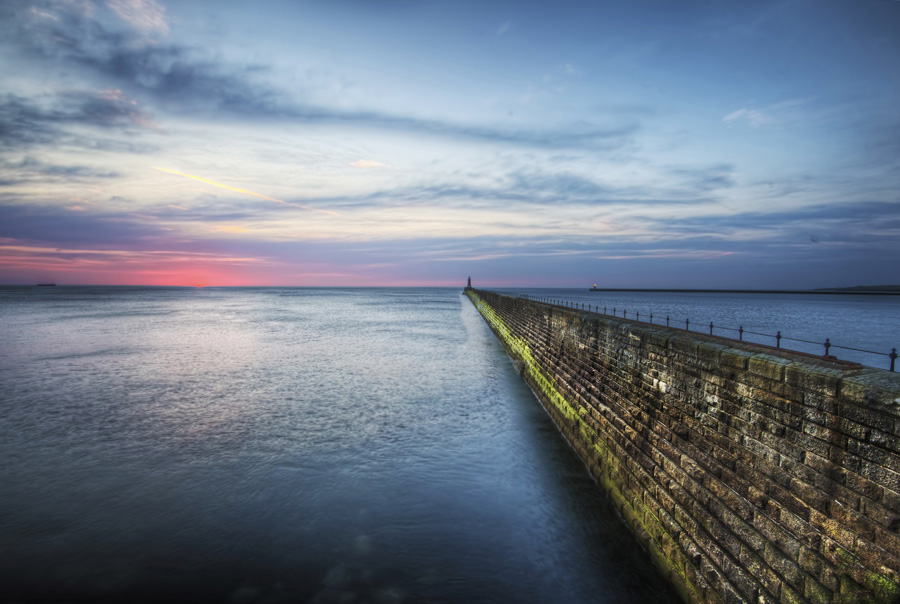
Tynemouth Pier looking out to the North Sea

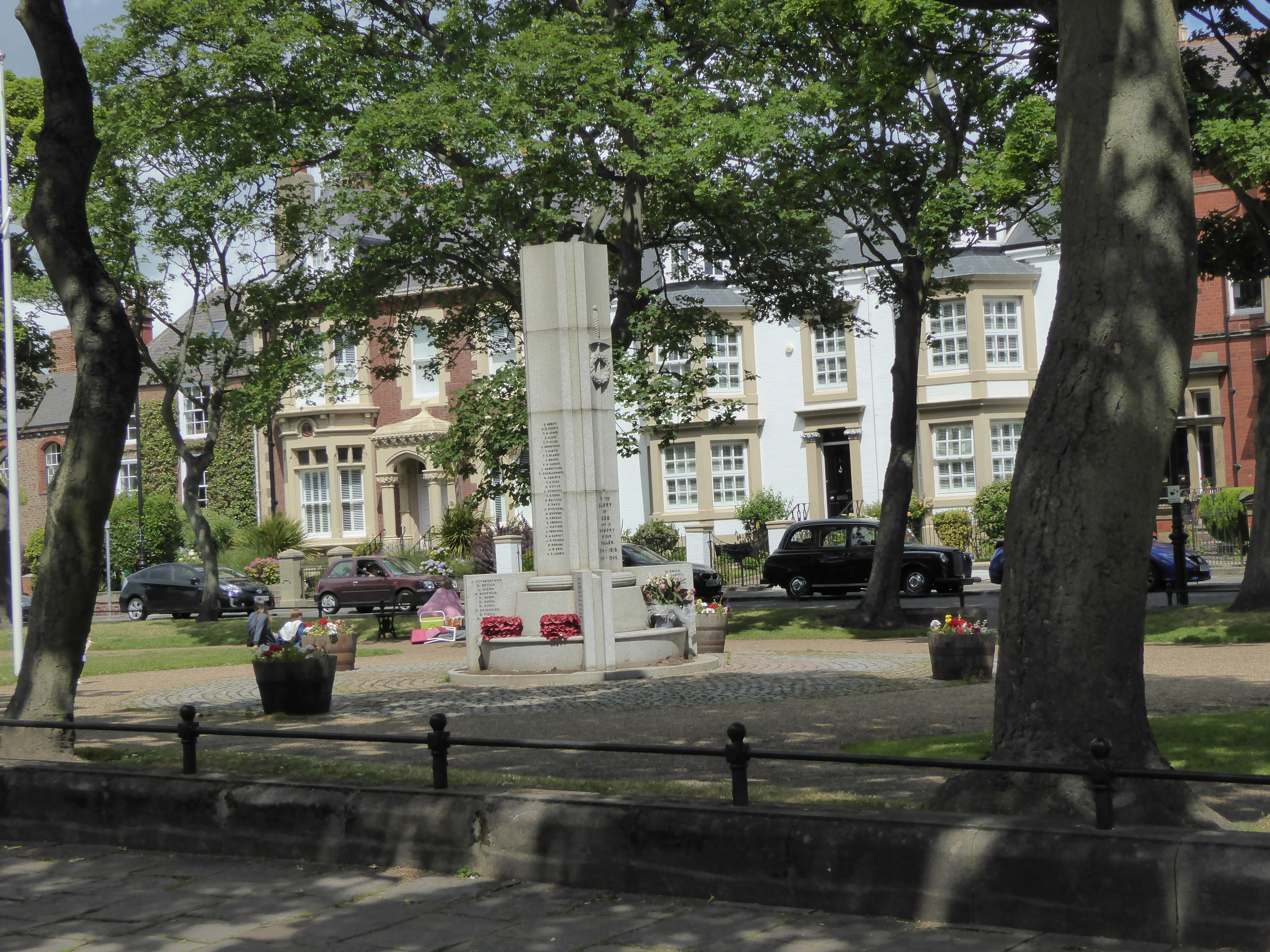
Tynemouth War Memorial

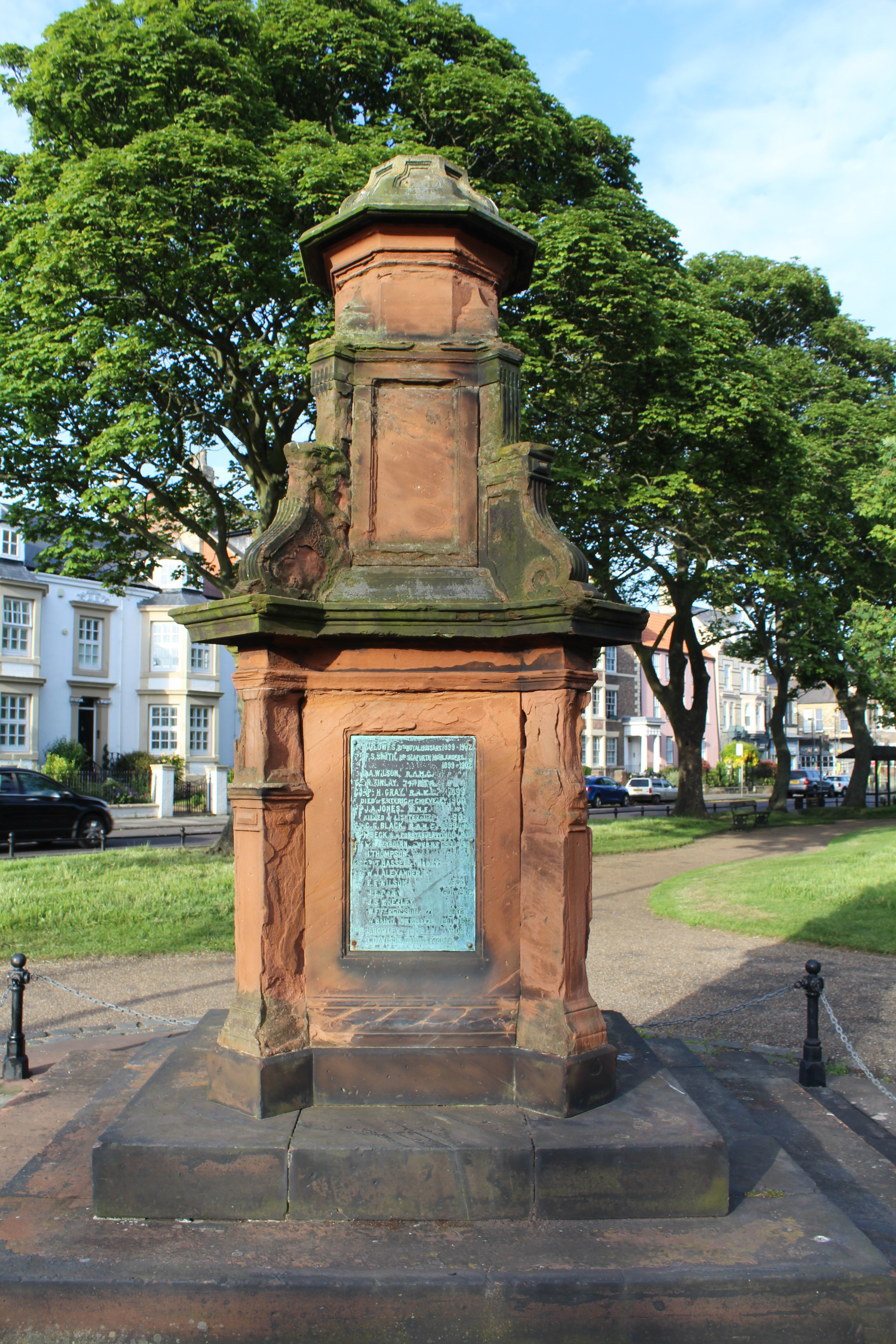
Tynemouth Boer War Memorial

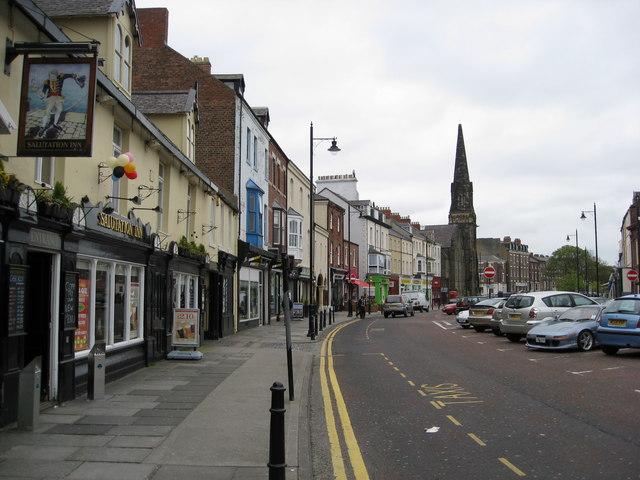
The view of Front Street from the Salutation Inn

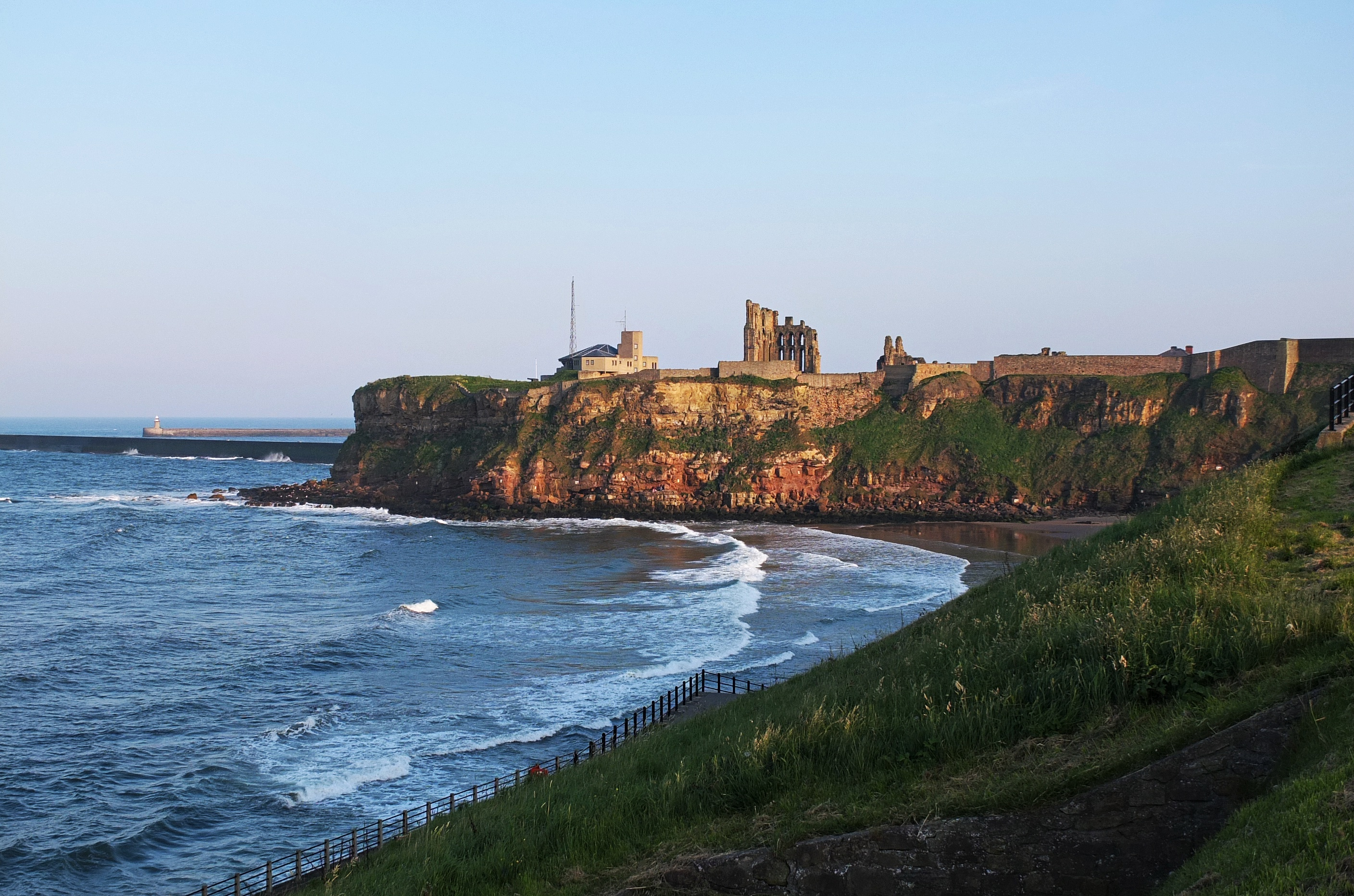
King Edward's Bay with Tynemouth Priory above the cliff

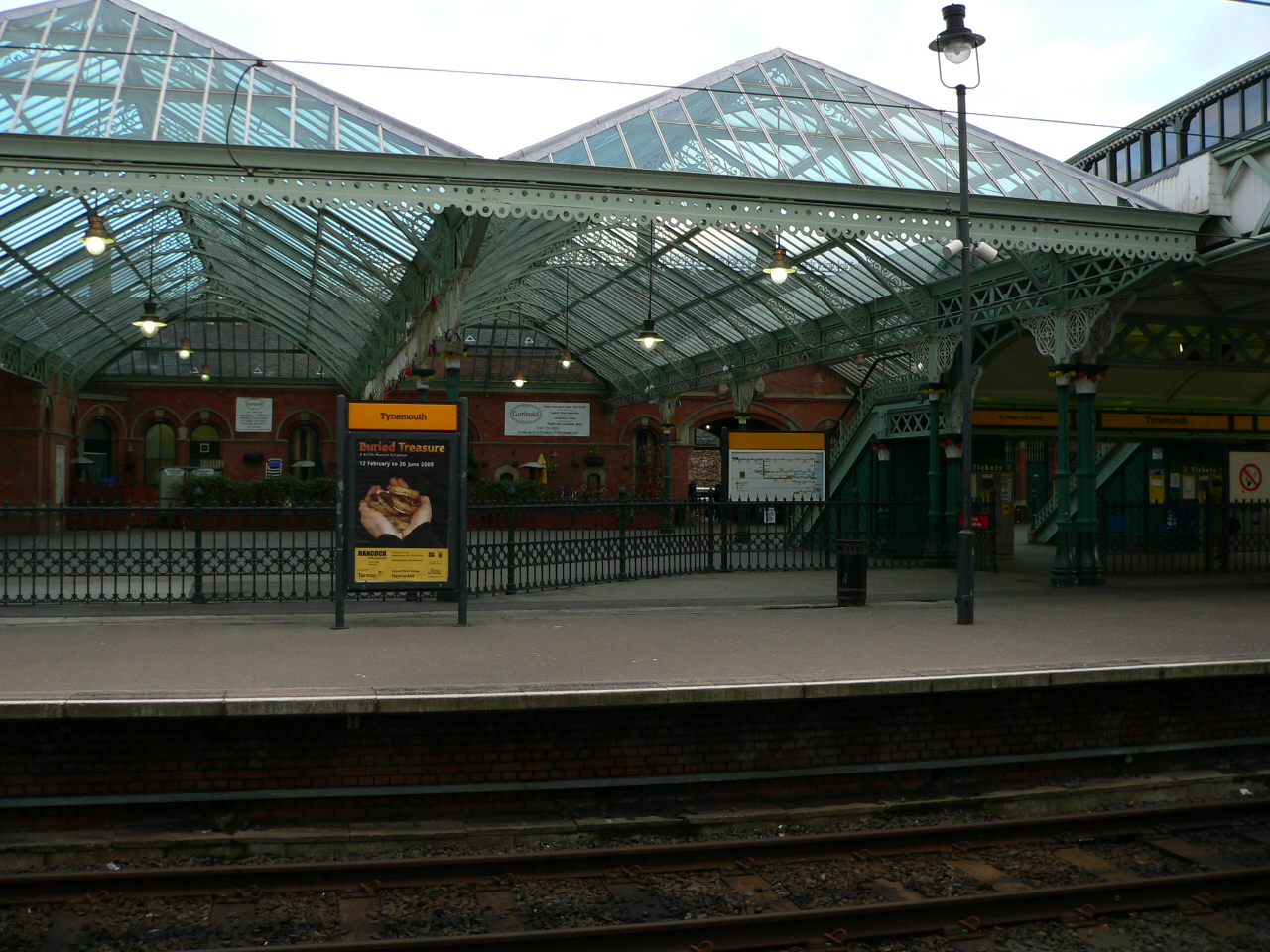
Tynemouth Metro Station

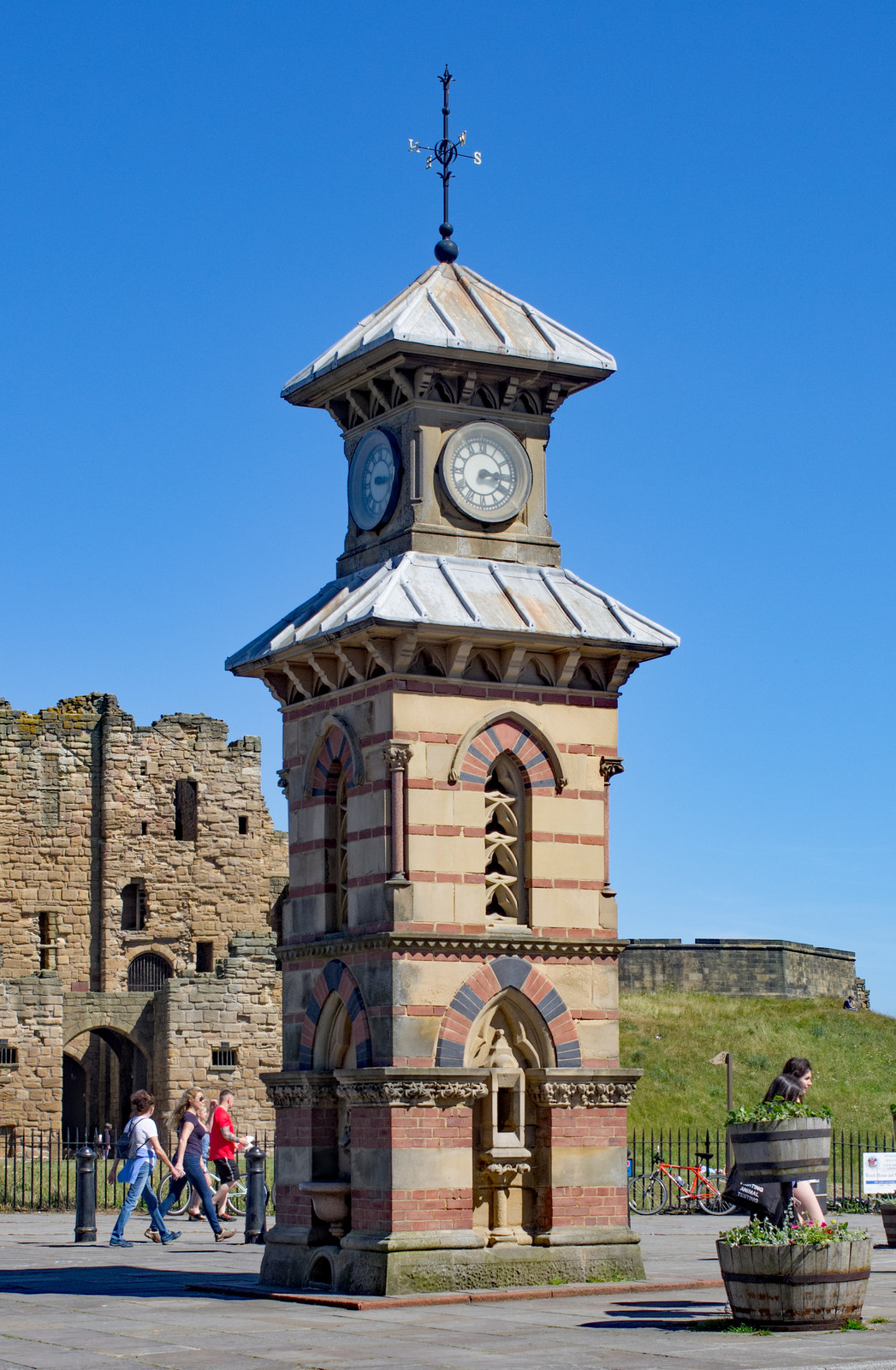
Tynemouth Clock Tower

== In popular culture ==
- Many of the books of prize-winning children's author Robert Westall are set in Tynemouth.
- The Fire Worm. London: Gollancz, 1988. ISBN 0-575-04300-8, a book by prize-winning science fiction author Ian Watson is set in Tynemouth, and is based on the Lambton Worm legend.
- The 1980s television series Supergran was predominantly filmed in Tynemouth and the flying bicycle and other artefacts used in filming were until 2006 on display in the Land of Green Ginger (converted Congregational Church) on Front Street.
- Many scenes from the 1961 film Payroll are set in Tynemouth.
- Several scenes from the TV series Vera have been shot in and around Tynemouth.
- A short Manga comic, written by Japanese animator Hayao Miyazaki, entitled A Trip To Tynemouth was released in 2006.
- The BBC Radio 4 drama series Home Front, comprised 561 episodes broadcast between the centenary of the outbreak of the First World War on 4 August 2014, and the centenary of the 1918 Armistice on 11 November 2018. The series was mostly set in Tynemouth and Folkestone, with links between characters related to each other in the two towns. It focused on the people involved in the war, those who stayed at home, and the industries that they worked in.

== Sources ==
- Grundy, John (2022). History of Northumberland. Newcastle upon Tyne: Tyne Bridge Publishing. ISBN 9781838280970.
