= Joseph Drury =

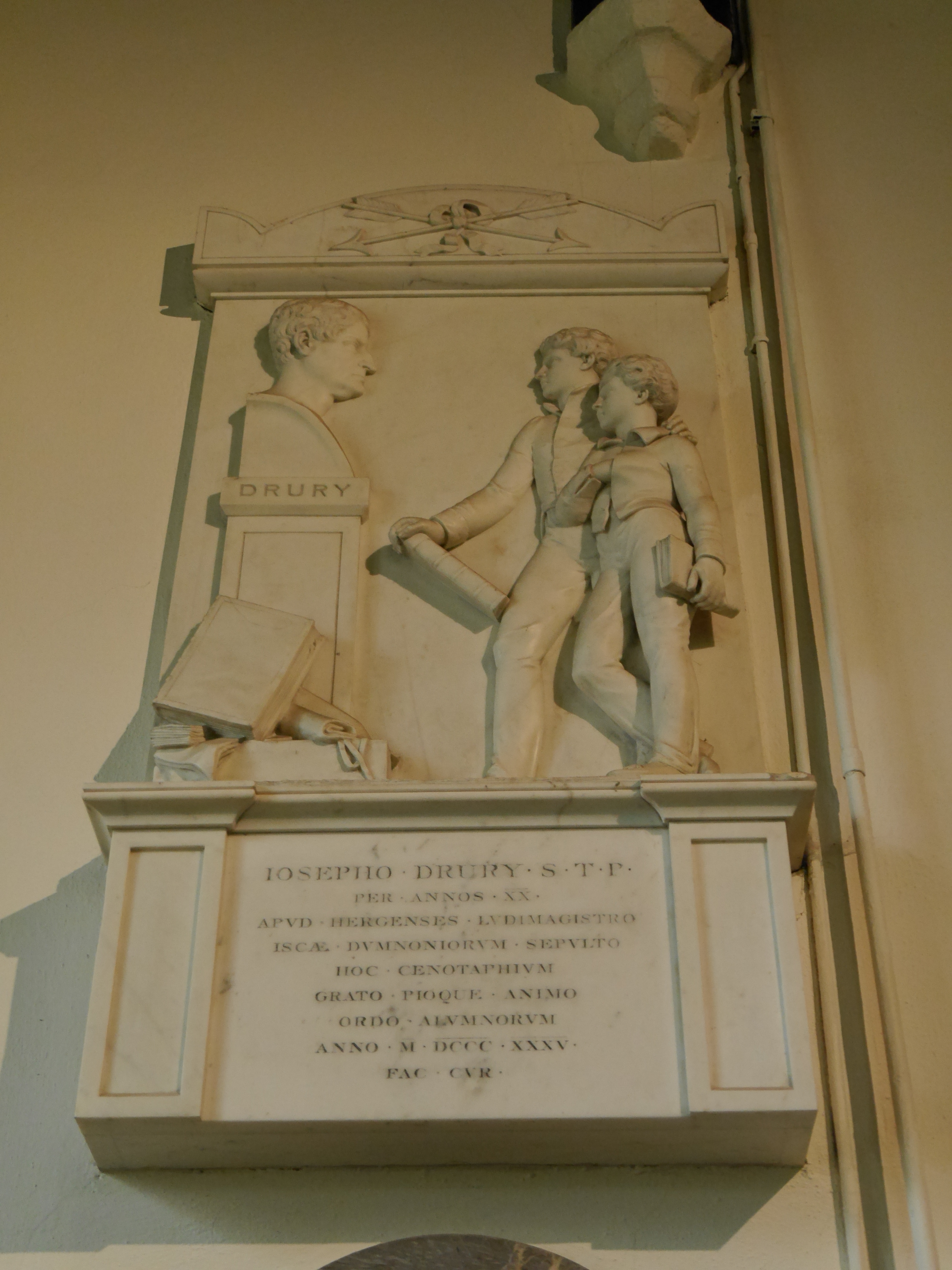
Joseph Drury memorial, St Mary's, Harrow on the Hill

Joseph Drury (11 February 1750 – 9 January 1834) was Head Master of Harrow School 1785–1805, and first of a dynasty of Drurys to teach at Harrow.

== Life ==
Drury was educated at Westminster School and Trinity College, Cambridge. Admitted to Trinity in 1768, he was unable to continue at Cambridge due to lack of means, and in 1769 became an assistant master at Harrow School.

In 1771, Drury turned down the chance to join Samuel Parr's breakaway school at Stanmore. He was ordained deacon in 1773 and priest in 1779. He was re-admitted to Trinity in 1774 as a "ten-year man", graduating B.D. in 1784 and D.D. in 1789.

Drury succeeded Benjamin Heath the younger, his brother-in-law, as headmaster of Harrow School in 1785.

== Family ==
In 1775 Drury married Louisa Heath, daughter of Benjamin Heath. Of their three sons Henry Joseph Thomas Drury (1778–1841) was a master at Harrow, and Benjamin Heath Drury (1782–1835), became an assistant-master at Eton College; and their daughter Louisa Heath Drury married John Herman Merivale.

His brother Mark Drury was Second Master at Harrow. He married Catherine Angelo, daughter of the fencing master Domenico Angelo.

Academic offices
| Preceded by Benjamin Heath | Head Master of Harrow School; 1785-1805 | Succeeded by George Butler |
