= Walker railway station =

Former railway station in Tyne and Wear on the Riverside Branch

Walker

General information
- Location: Walker, Newcastle upon Tyne; England
- Coordinates: 54.9716°N 1.5391°W
- Grid reference: NZ296642
- Platforms: 2

Other information
- Status: Disused

History
- Original company: North Eastern Railway
- Pre-grouping: North Eastern Railway
- Post-grouping: London and North Eastern Railway

Key dates
- 1 May 1879: Opened as Low Walker
- 13 May 1889: Renamed Walker
- 14 August 1967: Closed to freight
- 23 July 1973: Closed to passengers
Location

Walker was a railway station on the Riverside Branch which ran between Byker and Willington Quay. The station served Walker in Newcastle upon Tyne.

The station was opened to passengers on 1 May 1879 by the North Eastern Railway. Originally known as Low Walker, it was later renamed Walker on 13 May 1889.

== History ==
The Newcastle-upon-Tyne and North Shields Railway Act 1836 (6 & 7 Will. 4. c. lxxvi) received royal assent on 21 June 1836, with the line opening between Carliol Square and North Shields on 18 June 1839. It ran along the north bank of the River Tyne, although due to the meandering course of the river, it ran some distance from the shoreline at the eastern end.

The branch line, which was designed to more closely follow the shoreline of the Tyne, serving the rapidly developing industries and communities, was authorised in 1871. It was built along a route "that consisted for the most part of tunnels, bridges, cuttings, retaining-walls, and embankments".

The branch line opened on 1 May 1879. The delay in opening the line reflected the scale of the engineering works required to build the many tunnels, cuttings and retaining walls. Despite being a loop line, the line was officially known as the Riverside Branch.

In the early 1900s, tramway competition caused a rapid decline in the number of passengers using the North Eastern Railway's local services in North Tyneside. Therefore, in 1904, the branch line was electrified, using a 600 V DC third-rail system.

== Demise and closure ==
Between 1909 and 1948, an hourly all-day service ran on the line. In the late 1940s, passenger services on the branch were reduced to peak hours only, catering primarily for commuter traffic from the shipyards along the River Tyne.

The station's goods facilities, which served a number of shipping companies including Armstrong Whitworth, closed on 14 August 1967.

Along with the rest of the electric network in North Tyneside, the line was de-electrified in 1967, and converted to diesel multiple unit operation. By the early 1970s, traffic on the line had dwindled.

The last passenger train operated from Walker on 20 July 1973, with the branch line officially closing to passengers three days later.

| Preceding station | Disused railways | Following station |
|---|---|---|
| St. Anthonys; Line and station closed | North Eastern Railway; Riverside Branch | Carville; Line and station closed |
