= Point Pleasant railway station =

Former railway station in Tyne and Wear on the Riverside Branch

Point Pleasant

General information
- Location: Wallsend, North Tyneside; England
- Coordinates: 54.9921°N 1.5092°W
- Grid reference: NZ315664
- Platforms: 2

Other information
- Status: Disused

History
- Original company: North Eastern Railway
- Pre-grouping: North Eastern Railway
- Post-grouping: London and North Eastern Railway

Key dates
- 1 October 1898: Opened as an unadvertised halt
- 1 January 1902: Opened to the public
- 11 July 1966: Closed to freight
- 23 July 1973: Closed to passengers
Location

Point Pleasant was a railway station situated on the Riverside Branch, a line connecting Byker and Willington Quay. Serving the area of Willington Quay in North Tyneside, the station provided transportation services for local residents and travelers in the region.

Point Pleasant station began its operations on October 1, 1898, initially as an unadvertised halt established by the North Eastern Railway. It was later officially opened to the public on 1 January 1902.

This area of Wallsend was a hive of activity, and included many famous shipbuilders, such as the Wallsend Slipway and Engineering Company. The station was modest, with just two platforms and an iron lattice bridge of the standard North Eastern Railway design. Both platforms had a waiting room, with the booking office situated on the down platform.

== History ==
The Newcastle-upon-Tyne and North Shields Railway Act 1836 (6 & 7 Will. 4. c. lxxvi) received royal assent on 21 June 1836, and the line opened between Carliol Square and North Shields on 18 June 1839. It ran along the north bank of the River Tyne, although, due to the meandering course of the river, it ran some distance from the shoreline at the eastern end.

The branch line, designed to closely follow the shoreline of the Tyne and serve the rapidly developing industries and communities, was authorised in 1871. It was built along a route "that consisted for the most part of tunnels, bridges, cuttings, retaining-walls, and embankments".

The branch line opened on 1 May 1879. The delay in opening the line reflected the scale of the engineering works required to build the many tunnels, cuttings and retaining walls. Despite being a loop line, the line was officially known as the Riverside Branch.

In the early 1900s, tramway competition caused a rapid decline in the number of passengers using the North Eastern Railway's local services in North Tyneside. Therefore, in 1904, the branch line was electrified, using a 600 V DC third-rail system.

== Demise and closure ==
Between 1909 and 1948, an hourly all-day service ran on the line. In the late 1940s, passenger services on the branch were reduced to peak hours only, catering primarily for commuter traffic from the shipyards along the River Tyne.

The station's goods facilities closed on 11 July 1967. During this time, the line was de-electrified in 1967, and converted to diesel multiple unit operation. By the early 1970s, traffic on the line had dwindled.

The last passenger train operated from Point Pleasant on 20 July 1973, with the branch line officially closing to passengers three days later.

Preceding station	Disused railways	Following station
Carville; Line and station closed	North Eastern Railway; Riverside Branch	Willington Quay; Line and station closed
