= Meadow Well Metro station =

Tyne and Wear Metro station in North Tyneside

Meadow Well
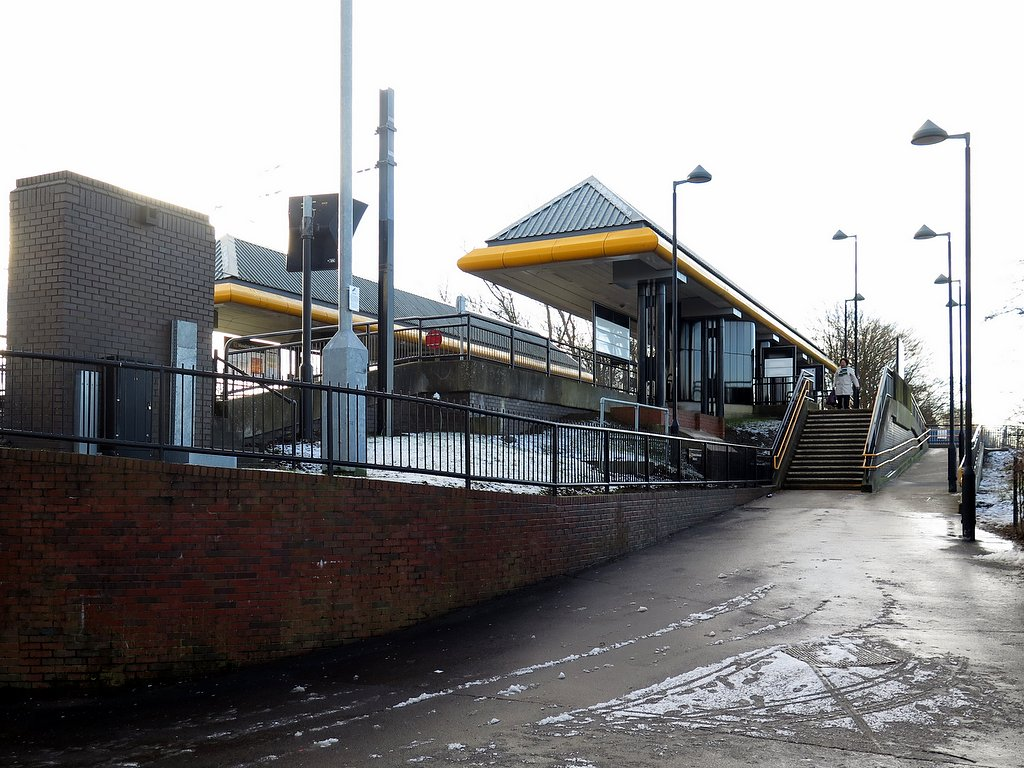

General information
- Location: Meadow Well, North Tyneside; England
- Coordinates: 55°00′06″N 1°27′56″W
- Grid reference: NZ342675
- System: Tyne and Wear Metro station
- Transit authority: Tyne and Wear PTE
- Platforms: 2
- Tracks: 2

Construction
- Cycle facilities: 2 cycle pods
- Accessible: Step-free access to platform

Other information
- Station code: MWL (1994–); SPK (1982–1994)
- Fare zone: B and C

History
- Original company: Tyne and Wear Metro

Key dates
- 14 November 1982: Opened as Smith's Park
- 10 October 1994: Renamed Meadow Well

Passengers
- 2024/25: 0.543 million

Services
Preceding station	Tyne and Wear Metro	Following station
North Shields towards South Shields via Whitley Bay	Yellow line	Percy Main towards St James
Location
- Location within Tyne and Wear

Meadow Well is a Tyne and Wear Metro station, serving the suburbs of Chirton and Meadow Well, North Tyneside in Tyne and Wear, England. It joined the network as Smith's Park on 14 November 1982, following the opening of the fourth phase of the network, between Tynemouth and St James via Wallsend.

== History ==
Unlike neighbouring Percy Main and North Shields, which were converted from former British Rail stations, Smith's Park was purpose-built for the Tyne and Wear Metro network in the early 1980s.

The station is located on the housing estate on which the Meadow Well Riots took place in 1991. Following the redevelopment of the Meadow Well and Royal Quays area in the early 1990s, the station was renamed Meadow Well in October 1994.

The station was refurbished in 2011, along with nearby Howdon. The refurbishment project involved the installation of white vitreous enamel panels, new seating and lighting, and improved security and accessibility, as well as resurfaced platforms. The station was also painted in to the new black and white corporate colour scheme.

Meadow Well is located about 1 mile (1.6 km) from the North Shields International Ferry Terminal, from which a daily ferry service to Amsterdam IJmuiden operates. The station is also a short walk from the Royal Quays Outlet Centre, which is just over half a mile to the south of the station.

== Facilities ==
Step-free access is available at all stations across the Tyne and Wear Metro network, with ramps providing step-free access to both platforms at Meadow Well. The station is equipped with ticket machines, sheltered waiting area, seating, next train information displays, timetable posters, and an emergency help point on both platforms. Ticket machines are able to accept payment with credit and debit card (including contactless payment), notes and coins. The station is also fitted with smartcard validators, which feature at all stations across the network.

There is no dedicated car parking available at the station. There is the provision for cycle parking, with two cycle pods available for use.

== Services ==
As of April 2021, the station is served by up to five trains per hour on weekdays and Saturday, and up to four trains per hour during the evening and on Sunday.
