= Howdon =

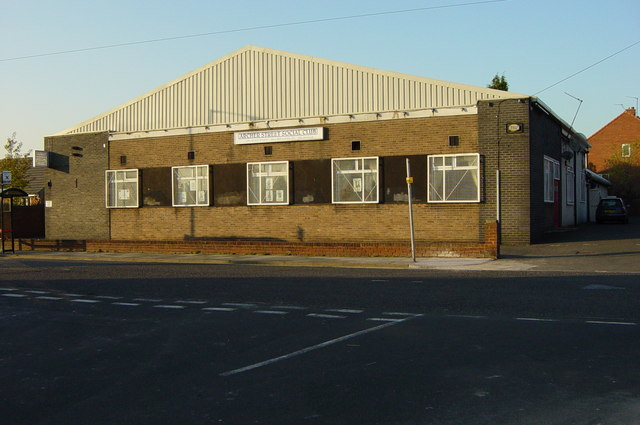
- Archer Street Social Club

- Location in Tyne and Wear
- Coordinates: 55.001°N 1.495°W
- OS grid reference: NZ324675
- Sovereign state: United Kingdom
- Country: England
- District: Tyne and Wear

Howdon is a largely residential area in the eastern part of Wallsend, Tyne and Wear, England. It consists of High Howdon and the smaller settlement of East Howdon. Much of the High Howdon area was formerly called Willington prior to post-World War II urbanisation. The North Tyneside ward population at the 2011 Census was 11,129.

== History ==
Howdon is an industrial settlement on the north bank of the River Tyne estuary, to the north of Howdon Pans (a Tyne water feature) and to the north-east of Willington Quay. In the mid-nineteenth century, it consisted of Old Howdon Pit situated on what is now the northern toll area of the Tyne Tunnel; and to the east, Howdon Bank Top, nowadays given the appellation East Howdon.

A separate area, High Howdon was built after the Second World War, as the consequence of a drive for improved, low-cost housing for working-class families. This housing was mainly in the public sector, being owned and maintained by the local council. It was built on what had been agricultural land to the north of the main railway line (from Newcastle to Tynemouth) that was to separate the new council housing from the earlier Howdon Pit, Pans and Hill Top sites locations, and from the older, industrial area of Willington Quay, where a great deal of housing had either been destroyed by wartime bombing, or by programmes of slum clearance.

Although most of the housing in High Howdon belonged to the local council, a number of privately owned and rented properties always existed in the centre of the area. Since right-to-buy legislation was introduced in the 1980s, many former council tenants have bought their homes, which has resulted in a large percentage of former council properties becoming privately owned.

Apart from the railway, High Howdon was separated from the industry of Willington Quay by Howdon Park, that featured tennis courts, bowling greens, a children's play area (including a paddling pool) and flower beds. This fell into disarray but was partly restored, due to pressure from the local community, during the 1990s.

== Education ==
Early education is provided by Denbigh Community Primary School, St. Aidan's RC Primary School (formerly Holy Cross RC Primary School) and Stephenson Memorial Primary School. The local high school is Churchill Community College. Formerly known as Willington High School, it was built on derelict land in Churchill Street in the 1960s.

== Amenities ==
A Community Centre was founded on the site of the former Willington Middle School on Denbigh Avenue. Other amenities in High Howdon include a small library, and shops along Tynemouth Road and at the southern end of Churchill Street. Close to the library was a set of dwellings that were once used to house police officers and their families. It also once functioned as a police station. A former maternity hospital, named Willington Quay Maternity Hospital, was closed in the 1970s.

Before World War II, the north end of Churchill Street was divided between colliery and agricultural land. During WW2, a secret military installation was said to exist in this area. Later, the Willington Square flats (known locally as the "14 storeys" or "14ers") were built here. These three tower blocks became a Tyneside landmark, and were featured in the film version of the BBC sitcom Whatever Happened to the Likely Lads?. They were demolished in the 1990s to make way for low-lying housing.

The area is bordered by the areas of Rosehill and Holy Cross to the west, Hadrian Park and New York to the north and North Shields and Percy Main to the east, as well as Willington Quay to the south. There is also a small community suburb called East Howdon, which is located between Percy Main and the Tyne River. Since being bypassed it is quite isolated. As such it has a very close community feel with one local restaurant, two social clubs and a community centre all belonging to three streets.

== Transport ==
High Howdon is served by Howdon Metro station on the Tyne and Wear Metro. This station replaced the original one from the Newcastle & North Shields Railway of 1839, which was demolished. The footbridge was preserved at Goathland railway station (a similar bridge from Percy Main station can be found in the National Railway Museum in York).

== Notable people ==
- The social reformer Francis Herbert Stead was born in Howdon in 1857, and his brother William Thomas Stead lived in the settlement.
