= Earl of Zetland (ship) =

Historic ship built in 1939

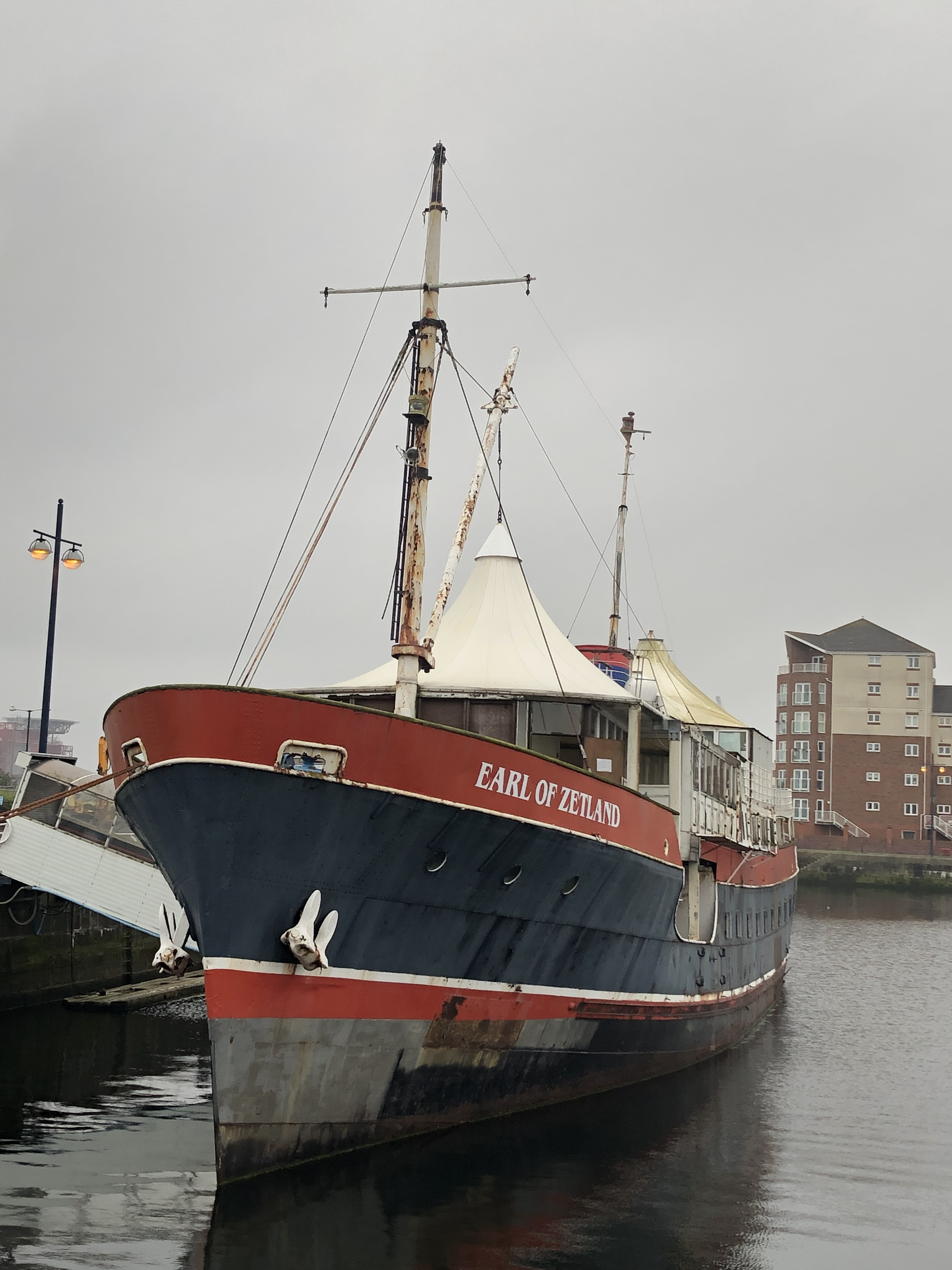
- The historic ship Earl of Zetland

History
- Name: Earl of Zetland
- Builder: Hall, Russell & Company
- Completed: 1939
- Renamed: Celtic Surveyor (1985)
- Identification: IMO number: 5095804

General characteristics
- Type: passenger vessel
- Tonnage: 548
- Length: 47.21 m (154.9 ft)
- Beam: 8.86 m (29.1 ft)
- Depth: 2.98 m (9.8 ft)
- Decks: 1

The ship Earl of Zetland was a steel hull vessel registered on the UK's National Register of Historic Vessels (number 990). She was built in 1939 by Hall, Russell & Company in Aberdeen, Scotland, as a passenger vessel. Brought into service at the outset of WWII, she travelled over 100,000 miles and carried approximately 600,000 servicemen to and from the Orkney Islands. The vessel is believed to be one of many small ships involved in the evacuation of Dunkirk.

Her previous names include Celtic Surveyor and La Passerelle. In 1975, she was sold to Middlesbrough Ocean Surveys and renamed Celtic Surveyor. She was converted to a diving support vessel and was used as such until 1982, whereupon she was hulked as a restaurant ship on the Thames near Embankment. In 1998 the ship was moored in Albert Edward Dock, North Shields, and was used as a floating restaurant.

In October 2020 an 8-week programme of work began on dismantling the vessel, which had been in a worsening state of repair for a number of years. Mike Newbold, owner of the restaurant vessel since 2009 stated "The Zetland was very expensive to maintain and towards the end it was an effort just to break even. Now with the pressures of Covid and other things it seemed the right thing to do. Everything comes to its conclusion." It is now listed in the National Archive of Historic Vessels.
