= Riverside Branch =

Former railway line in Tyne and Wear

Overview
- Status: Disused
- Locale: Tyne and Wear
- Termini: Byker; Willington Quay

Service
- Type: Heavy rail

History
- Work began: 1 May 1879
- Closed to passengers: 23 July 1973
- Closed to freight: 31 March 1988

Technical
- Line length: 6 1/2 miles (10.5 km)
- Number of tracks: Double track
- Track gauge: 4 ft 8 1/2 in (1,435 mm) standard gauge
- Electrification: Third rail (600 V DC) (1904–1967)

The Riverside Branch was an English 6 1/2-mile (10.5 km) double-track branch line, which ran between Riverside Junction in Heaton and Percy Main West Junction in Percy Main.

The line opened in May 1879, later being electrified in 1904, as part of the Tyneside Electrics network. It closed to passengers in stages between April 1954 and July 1973, with freight services continuing in to the late 1980s.

It now forms part of Cycle Route 72 (Hadrian's Cycleway) on the National Cycle Network.

== History ==
The Newcastle-upon-Tyne and North Shields Railway Act 1836 (6 & 7 Will. 4. c. lxxvi) received royal assent on 21 June 1836, with the line opening between Carliol Square and North Shields on 18 June 1839. It ran along the north bank of the River Tyne, although due to the meandering course of the river, it ran some distance from the shoreline at the eastern end.

The branch line, which was designed to more closely follow the shoreline of the Tyne, serving the rapidly developing industries and communities, was authorised in 1871. It was built along a route "that consisted for the most part of tunnels, bridges, cuttings, retaining-walls, and embankments".

The branch line opened on 1 May 1879. The delay in opening the line reflected the scale of the engineering works required to build the many tunnels, cuttings and retaining walls. Despite being a loop line, the line was officially known as the Riverside Branch.

In the early 1900s, tramway competition caused a rapid decline in the number of passengers using the North Eastern Railway's local services in North Tyneside. Therefore, in 1904, the branch line was electrified, using a 600 V DC third-rail system.

== Route ==
The branch line left the East Coast Main Line at Riverside Junction in Heaton, curving sharply to the right towards the station at Byker. After leaving the station, the line travelled through a 140-yard (130 m) tunnel under Shields Road, before descending through a cutting, at a gradient of 1 in 71 to St. Peters.

Between St. Peters and St. Anthonys, the line ran closely to the River Tyne, with views across the river to Felling and Gateshead. Travelling north-east from St. Anthonys, the line entered the 182-yard (166 m) Walker Tunnel, before reaching Walker, around 3 miles (4.8 km) from Riverside Junction.

Between Walker and Carville, there was an uninterrupted view of shipyards and industry, with glimpses across the River Tyne to Hebburn and Jarrow. After a series of sidings, the line turned sharply to the right, over a level crossing to Carville, near to the entrance of the Wallsend Shipyard.

At Point Pleasant, the line was around 5 miles (8 km) from Riverside Junction, and somewhat overshadowed by the walls of Wallsend Slipway. After crossing Wallsend Burn, the line reached Willington Quay. The station, then dominated by the view of Howdon Gas Works, was the final station on the branch, before rejoining with the former Newcastle and North Shields Railway at Percy Main West Junction.

== Demise and closure ==
Between 1909 and 1948, an hourly all-day service ran on the line. In the late 1940s, passenger services on the branch were reduced to peak hours only, catering primarily for commuter traffic from the shipyards along the River Tyne. The branch line's two least-used stations, Byker and St Anthonys, were closed in April 1954 and September 1960.

Along with the rest of the electric network in North Tyneside, the line was de-electrified in 1967, and converted to diesel multiple unit operation. By the early 1970s, traffic on the line had dwindled.

The last passenger train operated on 20 July 1973, with the branch line officially closing to passengers three days later. It remained open for goods services, closing in stages during the late 1970s and 1980s. The final section of the line closed on 31 March 1988.

== See also ==
- North Eastern Railway
- North Shields and Newcastle Railway
- North Tyneside Loop
