= Willington Quay railway station =

Former railway station in Tyne and Wear on the Riverside Branch

Willington Quay

General information
- Location: Willington Quay, North Tyneside; England
- Coordinates: 54.9924°N 1.4951°W
- Grid reference: NZ324665
- Platforms: 2

Other information
- Status: Disused

History
- Original company: North Eastern Railway
- Pre-grouping: North Eastern Railway
- Post-grouping: London and North Eastern Railway

Key dates
- 1 May 1879: Opened
- 2 October 1967: Closed to freight
- 23 July 1973: Closed to passengers
Location

Willington Quay was a railway station on the Riverside Branch, which ran between Byker and Willington Quay. The station served Willington Quay in North Tyneside.

The station was opened to passengers on 1 May 1879 by the North Eastern Railway. It was situated adjacent to Armstrong Road off Howdon Lane.

== History ==
The Newcastle and North Shields Railway received Royal Assent on 21 June 1836, with the line opening between Carliol Square and North Shields on 18 June 1839. It ran along the north bank of the River Tyne, although due to the meandering course of the river, it ran some distance from the shoreline at the eastern end.

The branch line, which was designed to more closely follow the shoreline of the Tyne, serving the rapidly developing industries and communities, was authorised in 1871. It was built along a route "that consisted for the most part of tunnels, bridges, cuttings, retaining-walls, and embankments".

The branch line opened on 1 May 1879. The delay in opening the line reflected the scale of the engineering works required to build the many tunnels, cuttings and retaining walls. Despite being a loop line, the line was officially known as the Riverside Branch.

In the early 1900s, tramway competition caused a rapid decline in the number of passengers using the North Eastern Railway's local services in North Tyneside. Therefore, in 1904, the branch line was electrified, using a 600 V DC third-rail system.

== Demise and closure ==
Between 1909 and 1948, an hourly all-day service ran on the line. In the late 1940s, passenger services on the branch were reduced to peak hours only, catering primarily for commuter traffic from the shipyards along the River Tyne.

The station's goods facilities, serving the Union Cement Company, North Eastern Marine Engineering Company and Wallsend Slipway, closed on 2 October 1967.

Along with the rest of the electric network in North Tyneside, the line was de-electrified in 1967, and converted to diesel multiple unit operation. By the early 1970s, traffic on the line had dwindled.

The last passenger train operated from Willington Quay on 20 July 1973, with the branch line officially closing to passengers three days later. The station was located about 200 m (220 yd) from Howdon, which offered a suitable alternative for passengers after closure.

Preceding station	Disused railways	Following station
Point Pleasant; Line and station closed	North Eastern Railway; Riverside Branch	Percy Main; Line and station closed
