= Percy Main Metro station =

Tyne and Wear Metro station in North Tyneside

Percy Main
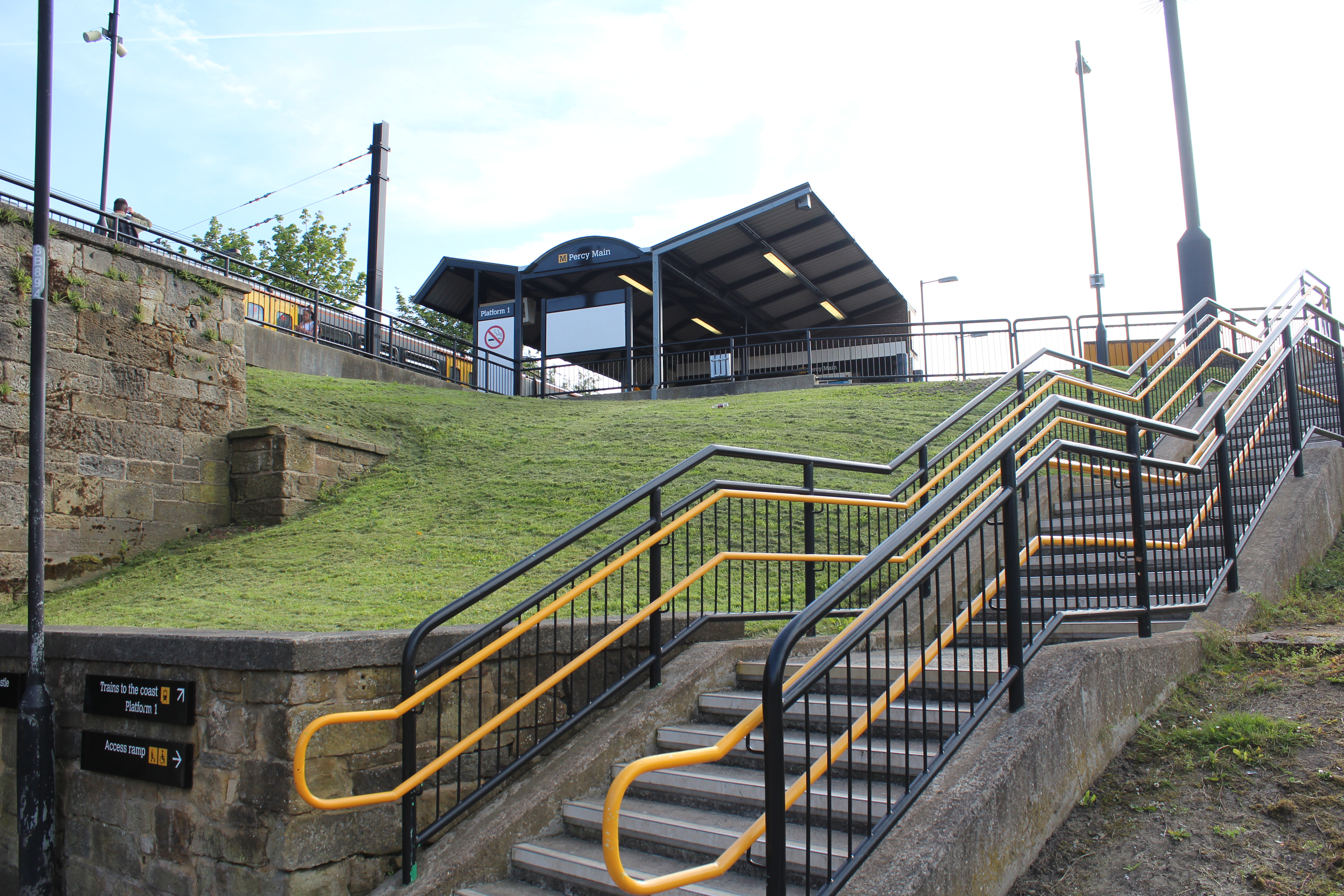

General information
- Location: Percy Main, North Tyneside; England
- Coordinates: 54°59′58″N 1°28′29″W
- Grid reference: NZ336673
- System: Tyne and Wear Metro station
- Transit authority: Tyne and Wear PTE
- Platforms: 2
- Tracks: 2

Construction
- Cycle facilities: 3 cycle pods
- Accessible: Step-free access to platform

Other information
- Station code: PCM
- Fare zone: B

History
- Original company: Newcastle and North Shields Railway
- Pre-grouping: North Eastern Railway
- Post-grouping: London and North Eastern Railway; British Rail (Eastern Region)

Key dates
- 22 June 1839: Opened
- 11 August 1980: Closed for conversion
- 14 November 1982: Reopened

Passengers
- 2024/25: 0.504 million

Services
Preceding station	Tyne and Wear Metro	Following station
Meadow Well towards South Shields via Whitley Bay	Yellow line	Howdon towards St James
Location
- Location within Tyne and Wear

Percy Main is a Tyne and Wear Metro station, serving the suburb of Percy Main, North Tyneside in Tyne and Wear, England. It joined the network on 14 November 1982, following the opening of the fourth phase of the network, between Tynemouth and St James via Wallsend.

== History ==
The station is on the site of the former Percy Main station, which was opened on 22 June 1839, on the Newcastle and North Shields Railway, serving a small riverside community clustered around a colliery. This later became part of the North Tyneside Loop, served by the North Eastern Railway.

Heading east from the Percy Main, towards Whitley Bay, the line crosses the 55° north line of latitude. The station is located to the east of the junction with the former Riverside Branch, which closed to passengers in July 1973, with goods services continuing in to the late 1980s.

Following closure for conversion in the early 1980s, the station was demolished and re-built. The original North Eastern Railway bridge was preserved by the National Railway Museum in York. The preserved footbridge is very similar to the one still in place at South Gosforth.

The station is a short walk from the southern terminus of the North Tyneside Steam Railway, a heritage line which runs through the site used by the Tyne and Wear Metro as a testing facility in the late 1970s.

== Facilities ==
Step-free access is available at all stations across the Tyne and Wear Metro network, with ramps providing step-free access to both platforms at Percy Main. The station is equipped with ticket machines, sheltered waiting area, seating, next train information displays, timetable posters, and an emergency help point on both platforms. Ticket machines are able to accept payment with credit and debit card (including contactless payment), notes and coins. The station is also fitted with smartcard validators, which feature at all stations across the network.

A small free car park is available, with six spaces, plus two accessible spaces. There is also the provision for cycle parking, with three cycle pods available for use.

== Services ==
As of April 2021, the station is served by up to five trains per hour on weekdays and Saturday, and up to four trains per hour during the evening and on Sunday.
