= Meadow Well =

District of North Shields, North East England

Coordinates: 55.003°N 1.466°W

Meadow Well, also known as Meadowell or the Ridges, is a district of North Shields, North East England. Historically in Northumberland, it is now part of the Tyne and Wear Metropolitan county. The population in 2016 was approximately 11,000.

== History ==
=== Construction ===
The council estate was constructed in the 1930s to house residents that were displaced by the clearance of the Dockwray Square and Low Town slum areas. These flats were replaced with better quality homes in the 1960s and 70s. Meadow Well was formerly known as the Ridges – a name still used by people today – since it was built on the site of the Ridges Farm. The name Meadow Well is derived from a well situated meadow upon which the estate was built.

=== Riots ===
On Monday, 9 September 1991, Meadow Well was featured heavily in the news across the UK as riots broke out following the death of two youths. The riots resulted in large parts of the Meadow Well estate being burned down, including residences, shops, electricity sub-stations, a community centre and a health centre. Today the area has been regenerated, with much of the original Meadow Well estate having been demolished and redeveloped. The riots spread to Benwell, Scotswood, and Elswick in Newcastle upon Tyne, and Pennywell in Sunderland on 12 September. Today the stigma still remains over the Meadow Well estate, even after redevelopment and regeneration.

== Transport ==
Meadow Well Metro station is on the yellow line of the Tyne and Wear Metro. It was originally named Smith's Park. The station was purpose built for the Metro and opened on 14 November 1982.

After the redevelopment of the Meadow Well and Royal Quays areas, the station was reopened on 10 October 1994 with the name Meadow Well Metro Station.

== Education ==
There are three Primary Schools which service the area. These include St Joseph’s Roman Catholic Primary School, Riverside Community Primary School and Nursery and Waterville Primary School. Norham High School, providing secondary education, is located to the north west.

== Geography ==
The estate is around a mile west of the centre of North Shields. Percy Main borders Meadow Well to the south. The hamlet of East Howdon is to the south west.

The Royal Quays Outlet Centre and Northumbrian Water's treatment works lie between the village and the River Tyne.
