= Howdon Metro station =

Tyne and Wear Metro station in North Tyneside

Howdon
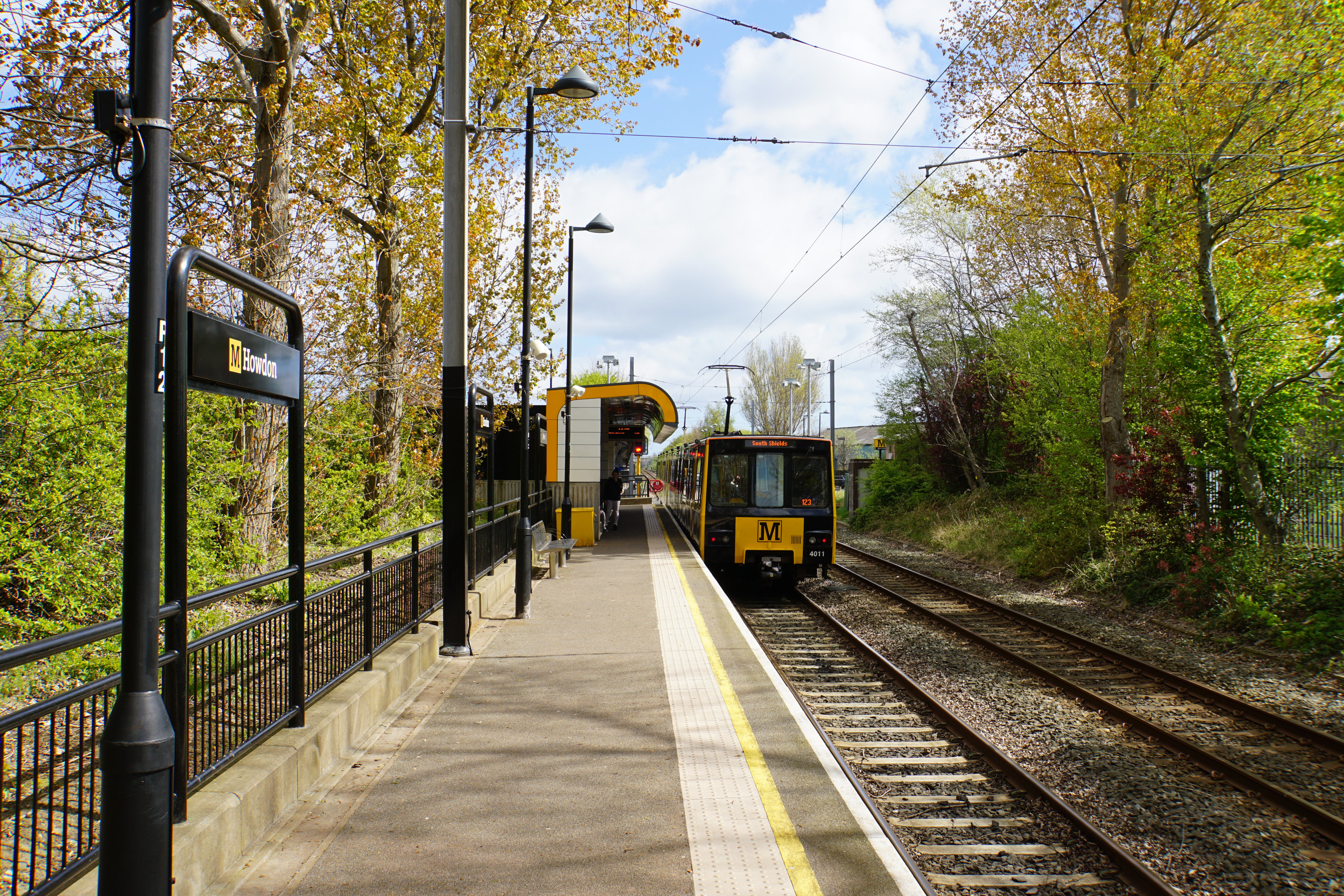

General information
- Location: Howdon, North Tyneside; England
- Coordinates: 54°59′45″N 1°29′39″W
- Grid reference: NZ324669
- System: Tyne and Wear Metro station
- Transit authority: Tyne and Wear PTE
- Platforms: 2
- Tracks: 2

Construction
- Cycle facilities: 5 cycle pods
- Accessible: Step-free access to platform

Other information
- Station code: HOW
- Fare zone: B

History
- Original company: Newcastle and North Shields Railway
- Pre-grouping: North Eastern Railway
- Post-grouping: London and North Eastern Railway; British Rail (Eastern Region)

Key dates
- 18 June 1839: Opened as Howdon
- 1 December 1875: Renamed Howdon-on-Tyne
- 11 August 1980: Closed for conversion
- 14 November 1982: Reopened as Howdon

Passengers
- 2024/25: 0.823 million

Services
Preceding station	Tyne and Wear Metro	Following station
Percy Main towards South Shields via Whitley Bay	Yellow line	Hadrian Road towards St James
Location
- Location within Tyne and Wear

Howdon is a Tyne and Wear Metro station, serving the suburb of Howdon, North Tyneside in Tyne and Wear, England. It joined the network on 14 November 1982, following the opening of the fourth phase of the network, between Tynemouth and St James via Wallsend.

== History ==
The station was opened on 22 June 1839 by the Newcastle and North Shields Railway. This later became part of the North Tyneside Loop, served by the North Eastern Railway. On 1 December 1875, the station was renamed Howdon-on-Tyne, to prevent it being confused with a station of a similar name station in the East Riding of Yorkshire.

Following closure for conversion in the early 1980s, the station was demolished and almost entirely re-built. Only the eastbound platform (trains towards Whitley Bay), clearly identifiable by its stone construction, remained from the original station. The westbound platform was re-built and sited on the opposite side of the level crossing on Howdon Lane, creating a staggered platform arrangement.

A pedestrian subway was built to allow passengers to cross the line, however, it does not have ramps for improved wheelchair or pushchair access. The North Eastern Railway footbridge was removed, and is now located at Goathland on the North Yorkshire Moors Railway.

The station was refurbished in 2011, along with nearby Meadow Well. The refurbishment project involved the installation of white vitreous enamel panels, new seating and lighting, and improved security and accessibility, as well as resurfaced platforms. The station was also painted in the new black and white corporate colour scheme.

== Facilities ==
Step-free access is available at all stations across the Tyne and Wear Metro network, with ramps providing step-free access to both platforms at Howdon. The station is equipped with ticket machines, waiting shelter, seating, next train information displays, timetable posters, and an emergency help point on both platforms. Ticket machines are able to accept payment with credit and debit card (including contactless payment), notes and coins. The station is also fitted with smartcard validators, which feature at all stations across the network.

There is no dedicated car parking available at the station. There is the provision for cycle parking, with five cycle pods available for use.

== Services ==
As of April 2021, the station is served by up to five trains per hour on weekdays and Saturday, and up to four trains per hour during the evening and on Sunday.
