= Willington Quay child abduction case =

2005 child abduction in England

The Willington Quay child abduction was the case of the abduction and rape of a 6-year-old girl in Willington Quay, North Tyneside, England, on 27 December 2005, when she was taken while in the bath.

A local man, Peter Voisey, a known sex offender, was later convicted of the crime and sentenced to life in prison. The brazen nature of the crime sparked widespread media interest and a Crimewatch appeal. It also sparked the largest ever man-hunt, at the time, by Northumbria Police. Assertions by the police that the crime had been a case of opportunistic abduction from the home by a stranger were initially met with scepticism, given the seemingly unbelievable nature of the crime. Voisey's conviction also sparked a review of the multi-agency public protection arrangements (MAPPA), which govern the monitoring of past offenders.

== Abduction ==
The girl was abducted from her ground-floor bath as her mother was in the next-door room. She was driven around the local area for 20 minutes, before being found naked in a snow-covered back alley. Initially, police only had the girl's eyewitness account of a "man in a red car" identified by her as a Vauxhall Astra, with no other witnesses present. The only forensic evidence the police could obtain was a footprint in the bathroom, and a partial DNA trace from the girl's fingernail. Through careful interview with the girl, it was ascertained from the route she was driven, that the offender had a good knowledge of the local area.

== Arrest ==
Peter Voisey, who was also known as Peter Smith, was originally questioned as part of a wide sweep of local people who might be of interest because he was a registered sex offender. Police were first aware of him as a sneak thief, committing high risk burglaries with a chance of discovery, but in 2001, he had been convicted of sexually assaulting a 12-year-old girl in a swimming pool changing room in Cheshire. He was not initially considered a priority lead, as he had been classified low risk due to good behaviour. Voisey initially appeared good natured, and had a good account of his movements. He continued to strenuously deny any involvement when interviewed further.

== Conviction ==
With no strong evidence, Voisey was convicted from a multitude of lesser clues. This included his local knowledge and his mobile phone records, which proved he was not where he claimed to be at the time. The trainer print had been matched to a pair he owned, only five of which had been sold in the North East that year. He had made a cryptic diary entry for the day in question, "Phew it's over, chill now", which he claimed referred to Christmas. He had also owned a red Astra, although this was scrapped before it could be seized as evidence. It was also concluded, although a partial match, that there was a high chance of the DNA found being Voisey's.

== See also ==
- Child abduction
