= Percy Main =

Village in North Shields, Tyne and Wear, England

Coordinates: 54.998°N 1.475°W

- Metropolitan county: Tyne and Wear
- Post town: North Shields
- Postcode district: NE29
- UK Parliament: Tynemouth

Percy Main is a small village absorbed into North Shields, North East England. Historically in Northumberland, it is now part of Tyne and Wear.

== History ==
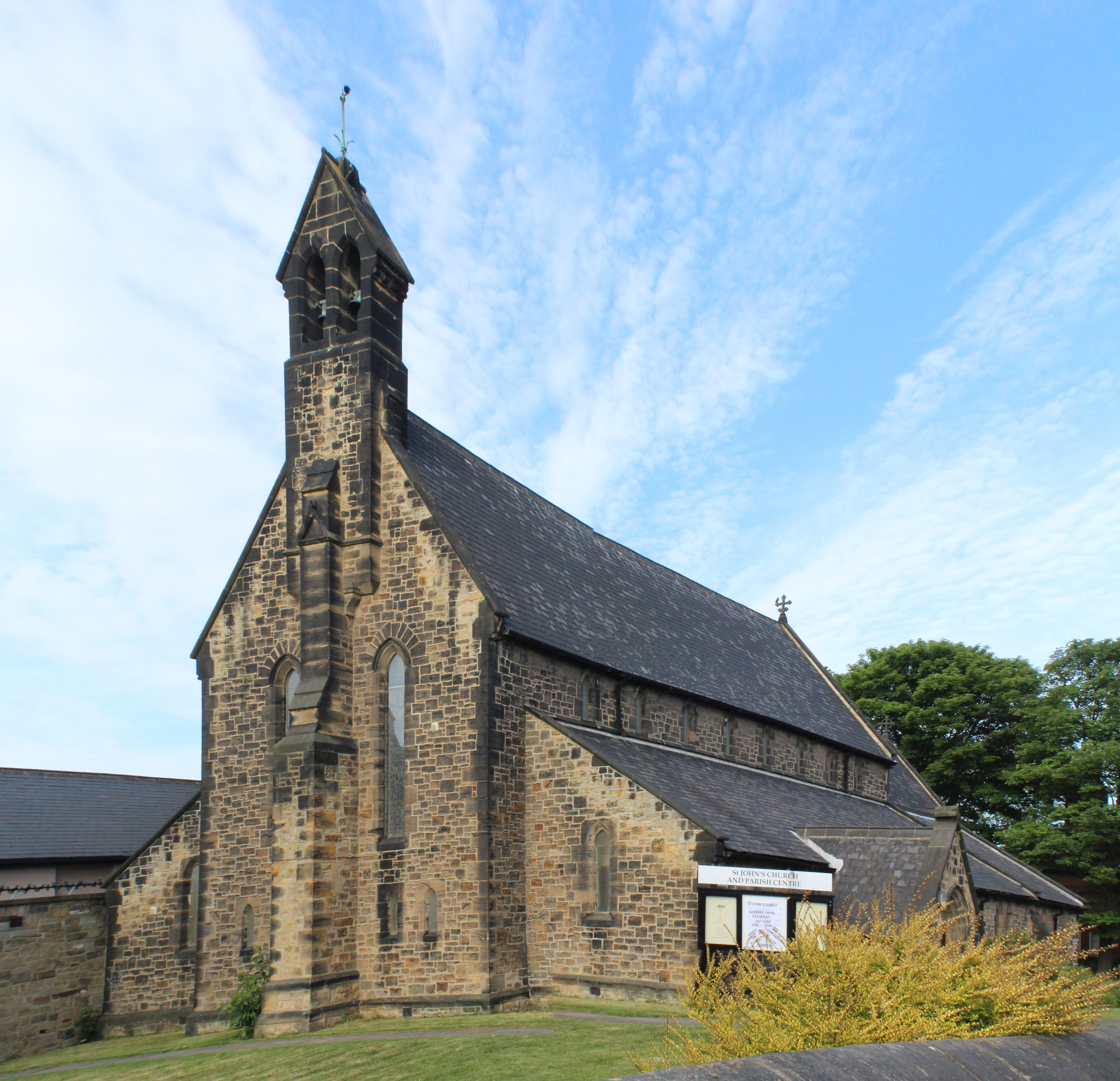
St John's church.

It is named after the colliery belonging to the Percy family, which was located just south of the railway, near St. John's church. The colliery was sunk in 1799 & went to a depth of 247 metres to the renowned Main seam, which was considered the best coal for household use. The village grew up around it to serve the pit, which eventually closed in 1895. In 1872, the population was recorded as 3,953, residing in 786 houses. The inhabitants worked mainly in the neighbouring docks and other industries.

During World War II, children from the village were evacuated to Hexham, Northumberland.

== Recreation ==
=== Sport ===
Sport is popular in the village, with Percy Main Cricket Club playing at St John's Green in the Northumberland and Tyneside Senior Cricket League, with their next door neighbours Percy Main Amateurs F.C. playing at Purvis Park in the Northern Football Alliance Premier Division. A hedge separates the two teams.

== Transport ==
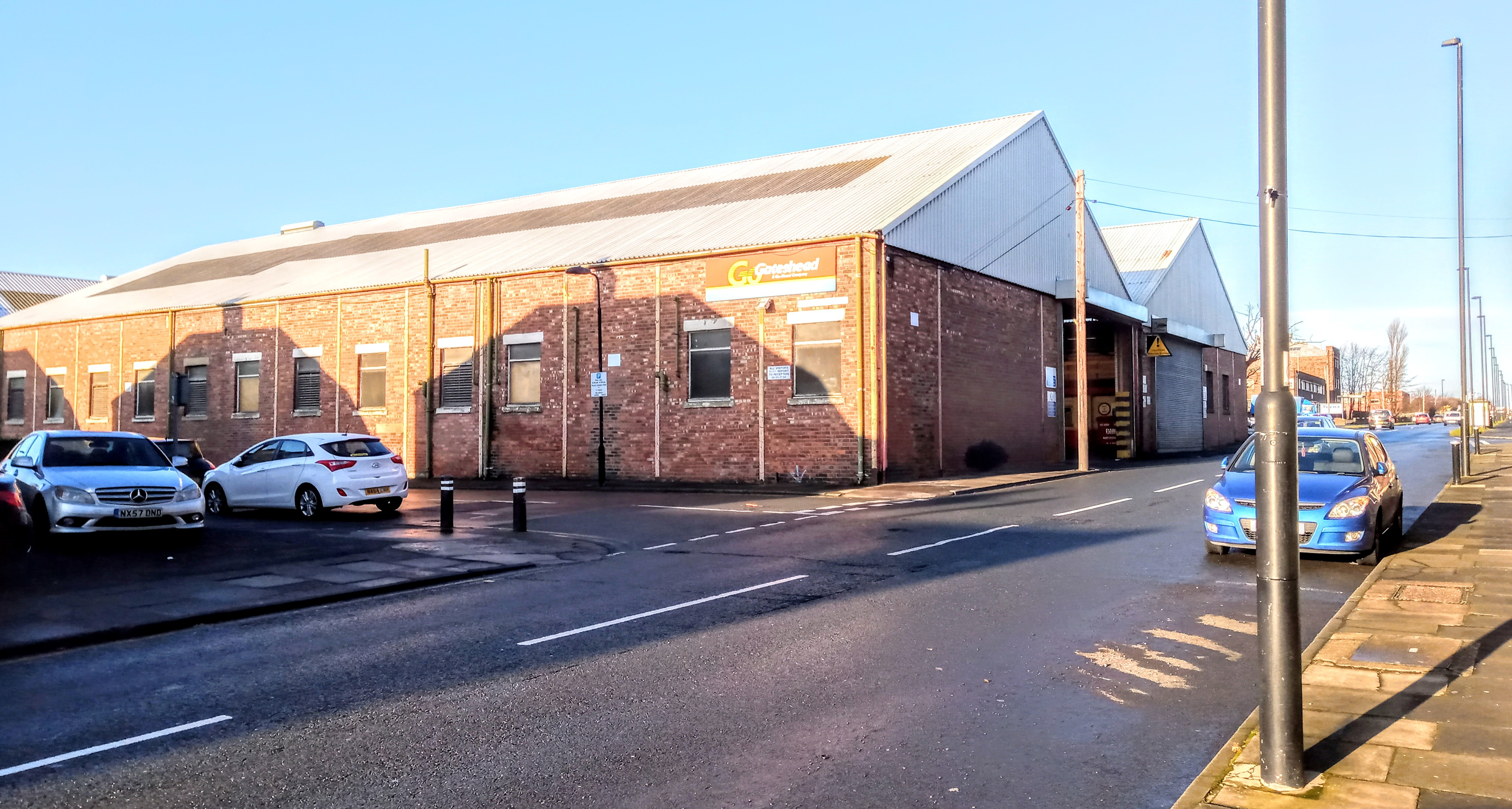
Percy Main, Go Ahead Bus Depot. North Shields, Tyne and Wear.

=== Rail ===
The village's main and only modern-day railway station is the Percy Main Metro station.

The original footbridge from the station is preserved at the National Railway Museum, York. A passenger station opened on the Newcastle and North Shields Railway around 1840. It closed on 11 August 1980 to allow conversion for the Metro, before re-opening on 14 November 1982.

In 2020, Nexus constructed a new depot for the Tyne and Wear Metro on a former landfill site immediately to the east of the village. The depot will house rolling stock while the South Gosforth Traction Maintenance Depot is reconstructed in anticipation of a new fleet in late 2021. Originally intended to be a temporary measure, upgrades to the Metro system around South Shields may mean the depot is made a permanent feature.

=== Bus ===
Go Ahead Group has a bus depot on Norham Road and a number of its services pass through the village.

=== Hollywood Trivia ===
Film directors and brothers Ridley Scott and Tony Scott formed their first film production company under the name Percy Main Productions. Their father grew up in the village. Thelma & Louise is a notable film during this time. In 1996 they renamed their production company to Scott Free, and finally to Scott Free Productions.

== Religion ==
Percy Main is part of a Church of England parish that also includes Meadow Well, East Howdon and the Royal Quays.

The parish church, Tynemouth Percy St John, was built for the Duke of Northumberland in 1862, and is Grade II listed. Designed by Anthony Salvin, it is built in sandstone and was re-ordered around 2000, to incorporate use as a community centre. Located on St John's Terrace, the church shares a vicar with the nearby St Peter's, on the Balkwell estate. The contemporary vicarage, at the junction of Waterville Road and Norham Road, was sold in the 1940s and converted into a pub, now The Redburn. A new vicarage was built adjacent to the church.

The Diocese of Newcastle's main administrative office is located at Church House, formerly Percy St John's Primary School. The religious resources centre the diocese shares with the Diocese of Durham is also on the site. The earlier school it replaced was located on the site of St John's Court, immediately to the north of the church. Excess bricks from the building of the Court were used to construct a hall to the rear of the church. The 2000 re-ordering included re-cladding of the original brickwork, obscuring this.

The village, at one time, also had primitive Methodist and Baptist chapels, though these no longer exist.

== Education ==
Percy Main Primary School is located in the village. After a short inspection by Ofsted in 2016, the school was rated as Good.

Norham High School, providing secondary education, is located a little to the north. In 2016, a full Ofsted inspection found that the school Requires Improvement, however this was downgraded to inadequate in 2018, leading to its placement in special measures. A monitoring inspection the following year confirmed that the remedial action was having a positive result, though the school remains in special measures.

== Geography ==
The village is around a mile and a half south west of the centre of North Shields. The hamlet of East Howdon is almost immediately south.

The large Meadow Well estate borders the village to the north. The portion of the estate south of the Metro line, and to the east of Percy Main, was redeveloped as Riverside Park in the early 1990s.

The Royal Quays Outlet Centre and Northumbrian Water's treatment works lie between the village and the River Tyne.

== Facilities ==
Redburn Park Medical Centre is located just to the north of the Metro station.
