= Meadow Well riots =

1991 riots in the UK

- Date: 9–12 September 1991
- Location: Meadow Well, North Shields; Subsequently Benwell, Scotswood, Elswick, Pennywell
- Methods: Rioting, arson, robbery, assault
- Result: Shops, homes, vehicles destroyed

Reported fatalities and injuries
- Deaths: 2
- Injuries: Unknown
- Arrested: 50+
- Damage: Homes, businesses, schools, and community centres attacked

The Meadow Well riots were a series of riots that took place during September 1991, starting on the Meadow Well council estate in North Shields, east of Newcastle, England, in response to a police enquiry, specifically regarding youths. The riots subsequently spread as far as Benwell, Scotswood and Elswick in Newcastle upon Tyne. They are regarded as some of the worst riots in British history.

== Background ==
The bulk of the Meadow Well Estate was built in the 1930s to accommodate low income residents who were displaced by slum clearances in nearby North Shields. It was originally called The Ridges, but in 1968 the local authority changed its name to Meadow Well in an attempt to improve the image of the dilapidated estate. The estate was considered a no-go area for many non-residents and police alike, long before the riots of 1991 occurred.

== Riots ==
=== Meadow Well ===
North Shields, along with most of the rest of the region, had been experiencing an economic downturn since the 1970s, with rising unemployment and crime. Although the tension had been brewing for decades, the riots themselves were finally triggered by the deaths of two local youths, Dale Robson and Colin Atkins, who were killed fleeing the police at high speed when the stolen car in which they were joyriding crashed. The prosecution at the subsequent trial of those accused of being involved in the rioting said the rioters were "gripped by a hatred of the police". Ostensibly in response to such reports of police brutality, locals began looting shops on the estate and setting buildings on fire.

These included a youth centre, a health centre, and an electricity sub-station, as well as extensive vandalism to numerous buildings and vehicles. Rioters forced Asian shopkeepers out of their homes before setting them on fire shouting, "Let's burn out the Pakis!" Cars and derelict houses were set on fire and a makeshift barrier was erected in the centre of the estate, which was removed by police.

Police and fire crews attending the scene were pelted with bricks. It was estimated that at the peak of the rioting, around 400 people were involved. At least 50 people were arrested.

=== Other suburbs ===
By 12 September, the riots had spread from Meadow Well to other districts of Tyneside. Rioters were now targeting businesses in Benwell, Scotswood and Elswick, including the Dodds Arms pub. When police arrived on the scene, they were forced back by a crowd of over 300 youths, as stones were thrown at them, and fire engines suffered extensive damage and vandalism. Benwell high street was entirely left in ruin, as people upon roofs threw roof tiles at police vans.

== Aftermath ==
The riots were condemned by Prime Minister, John Major and Home Secretary Kenneth Baker, while the Chief of Northumbria Police, Sir Stanley Bailey said the perpetrators would be caught and charged. Major did not deploy riot police immediately as he wanted the crowd to be contained first. This decision was later criticised for giving the rioters a free hand.

After the riots, £66 million was spent on regenerating the estate. Around 750 properties were demolished, and new houses were built, while the remaining properties were refurbished. A new community centre, health centre, and police station were established, though the police station has since been closed.

The Cedarwood Trust, founded in 1980, has continued to work exclusively in the area and was instrumental in rebuilding the community. The trust has operated from several sites over the years, but by 2019 it was operating from the Meadowhall Centre, in the heart of the estate and an area regarded as a focus of conflict.

Meadow Well-Connected was established in 1993 to enable and support the residents of the Meadow Well and the surrounding area. The charity aims to train local people with new skills and develop confidence by offering training, support and volunteering opportunities.

== Broader context ==
The Meadow Well riots were one of several waves of rioting which hit parts of Britain during 1991 and 1992. Other areas affected by rioting were Handsworth in Birmingham, Ely in Cardiff, Kates Hill in Dudley and Blackbird Leys in Oxford. These riots were comparable with earlier waves of rioting which had been seen across Britain in 1981 and again in 1985. Rioting on this scale in Britain was not seen again until August 2011.
