= Hadrian Road Metro station =

Tyne and Wear Metro station in North Tyneside

Hadrian Road
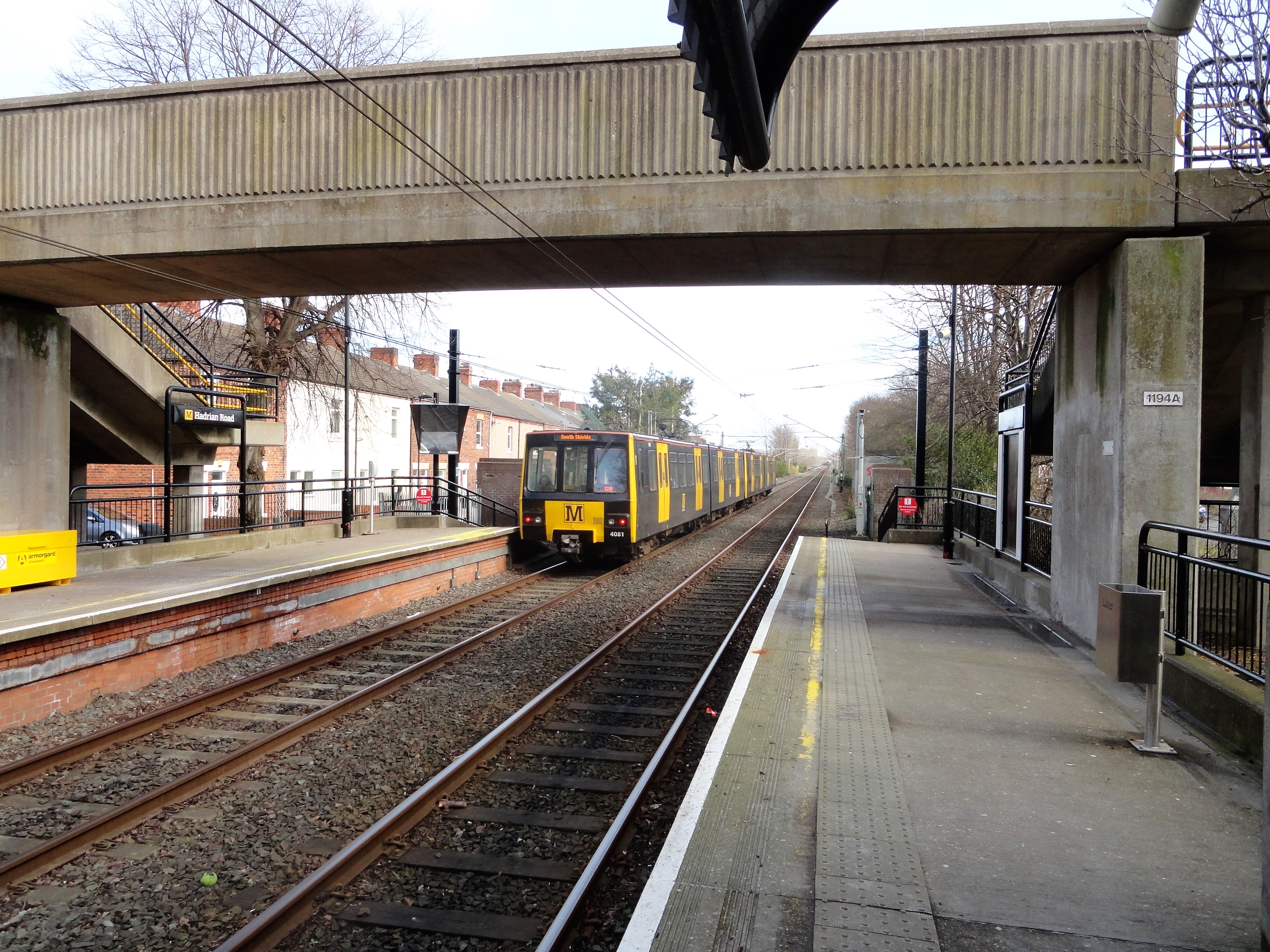

General information
- Location: Wallsend, North Tyneside; England
- Coordinates: 54°59′32″N 1°30′57″W
- Grid reference: NZ310665
- System: Tyne and Wear Metro station
- Transit authority: Tyne and Wear PTE
- Platforms: 2
- Tracks: 2

Construction
- Cycle facilities: 4 cycle pods
- Accessible: Step-free access to platform

Other information
- Station code: HDR
- Fare zone: B

History
- Original company: Tyne and Wear Metro

Key dates
- 14 November 1982: Opened

Passengers
- 2024/25: 0.269 million

Services
| Preceding station | Tyne and Wear Metro | Following station |
|---|---|---|
| Howdon towards South Shields via Whitley Bay | Yellow line | Wallsend towards St James |
Location
- Location within Tyne and Wear

Hadrian Road is a Tyne and Wear Metro station, serving the town of Wallsend, North Tyneside in Tyne and Wear, England. It joined the network on 14 November 1982, following the opening of the fourth phase of the network, between Tynemouth and St James via Wallsend.

== History ==
Unlike neighbouring Wallsend and Howdon, which were converted from former British Rail stations, Hadrian Road was purpose-built for the Tyne and Wear Metro in the early 1980s.

== Facilities ==
Step-free access is available at all stations across the Tyne and Wear Metro network, with ramps providing step-free access to both platforms at Hadrian Road. The station is equipped with ticket machines, sheltered waiting area, seating, next train information displays, timetable posters, and an emergency help point on both platforms. Ticket machines are able to accept payment with credit and debit card (including contactless payment), notes and coins. The station is also fitted with smartcard validators, which feature at all stations across the network.

There is no dedicated car parking available at the station. There is the provision for cycle parking, with four cycle pods available for use.

== Services ==
As of April 2021, the station is served by up to five trains per hour on weekdays and Saturday, and up to four trains per hour during the evening and on Sunday.
