= Willington Quay =

Area in North Tyneside, England

Coordinates: 54.983333°N 1.5°W

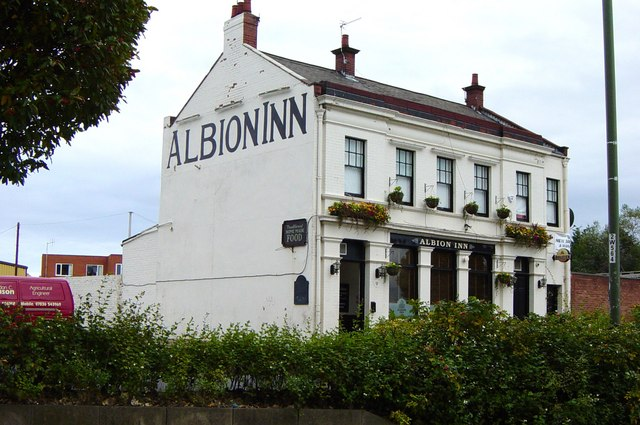
- Albion Inn

- Location within Tyne and Wear
- Metropolitan borough: North Tyneside
- Metropolitan county: Tyne and Wear
- Region: North East
- Country: England
- Sovereign state: United Kingdom
- Police: Northumbria
- Fire: Tyne and Wear
- Ambulance: North East

Willington Quay is an area in the borough of North Tyneside in Tyne and Wear in northern England. It is on the north bank of the River Tyne, facing Jarrow, and between Wallsend and North Shields. It is served by the Howdon Metro station in Howdon. The area from 2006 onwards has been an area of new housing built on brownfield sites. The house building continues into 2013 and is changing the social and economic balance in the area. The area has also had a make over of the bowling green off Howdon Lane and further warehousing next to the bowling green has been demolished to make way for further new housing.

== Local government ==
The area, originally in the parish of Wallsend, on 30 September 1894 Willington Quay became a separate civil parish, being formed from the part of Wallsend parish in Willington Quay Urban District. The Local Government Act 1894 brought together the Howdon and Willington Quay USDs as an urban district of Northumberland. On 9 November 1910 the parish was abolished and merged with Wallsend. In 1910, the urban district became part of the borough of Wallsend. In 1901 the parish had a population of 7941.

== History ==
=== Industry ===
The Tyne Iron Shipyard was founded in 1876 in the village. It suffered a major fire in 1920, which resulted in several workshops being destroyed and ships being damaged. The yard was acquired by Armstrong Whitworth in 1928 after the original company went into liquidation. The following year, it completed construction of the cargo ship Kitty Taylor. The company sold the yard in 1933.

Eltringham's ship yard, the site of which was bought in 1912, was formerly on the banks of the River Tyne in the village. The yard was later the site of a plywood factory. Cookson's lead works was another company once operating in the village.

Addison, Potter and Son, a cement-making company, was acquired by the British Portland Cement Manufacturing Company in 1912.

The steel wire and rope manufacturers Messrs. R. Hood Haggie and Son, founded in 1789, was also situated in Willington Quay. As of 2016, the site is still used for rope manufacture, by Bridon.

=== Culture ===
In 1936, Irene Ward MP wrote to The Times to ask if readers would consider donating musical instruments to the unemployed of the village. One member of the community had apparently made his own violin. The same year, a Daily Mail article recorded that young people were having to leave the area in order to find work.

=== Transport ===
The village's railway station closed in 1973. Despite this, the nearby village of Howdon is still connected to the Tyne and Wear metro service

=== Health ===
Willington Quay Maternity Hospital was a 14-bed facility built in 1926, the first to be built by Northumberland County Council. It was closed in the 1970s and demolished by 1995.

== Religion ==
A United Presbyterian church was built in 1867, with a 92 foot spire.

St Paul's, a Church of England chapel, in the benefice of the Willington Team Parish, the deanery of Tynemouth and the Diocese of Newcastle, was reordered to provide a base for St Paul's Community Partnership in the late 2000s.

== Notable people ==
- Norman Brown, Sunderland footballer (born in Willington Quay)
- Harry Chambers, Footballer, Liverpool F.C.
- Mike Neville, television newsreader (born in Willington Quay)
- Robert Stephenson, railway engineer (born in Willington Quay)

== See also ==
- Willington Quay child abduction case
