= Byker railway station =

Former railway station in Tyne and Wear on the Riverside Branch

Byker
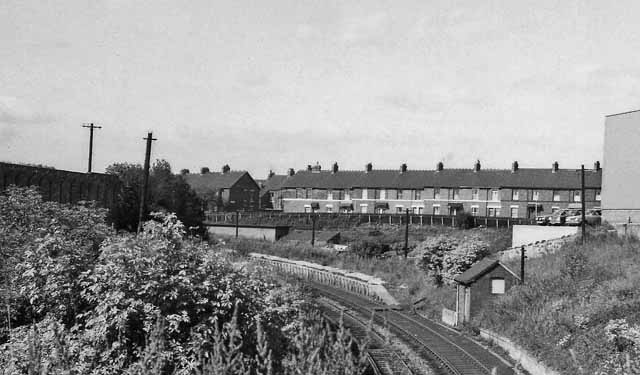

General information
- Location: Byker, Newcastle upon Tyne; England
- Coordinates: 54.9775°N 1.5863°W
- Grid reference: NZ266648
- Platforms: 2

Other information
- Status: Disused

History
- Original company: North Eastern Railway
- Pre-grouping: North Eastern Railway
- Post-grouping: London and North Eastern Railway

Key dates
- 1884: Opened as an unadvertised halt
- 1 March 1901: Opened to the public
- 5 April 1954: Closed
Location

Byker was a railway station on the Riverside Branch, which ran between Byker and Willington Quay. The station served Byker in Newcastle upon Tyne.

The station was opened as an unadvertised halt in 1884 by the North Eastern Railway. It was later opened to the public on 1 March 1901. Prior to opening to the public, the station was known as Byker Platform.

The station was located on Roger Street off Heaton Park Road. Due to the station's proximity to nearby Heaton, ticket sales for Byker were, for most of the station's life, credited to Heaton.

== History ==
The Newcastle-upon-Tyne and North Shields Railway Act 1836 (6 & 7 Will. 4. c. lxxvi) received royal assent on 21 June 1836, with the line opening between Carliol Square and North Shields on 18 June 1839. It ran along the north bank of the River Tyne, although due to the meandering course of the river, it ran some distance from the shoreline at the eastern end.

The branch line, which was designed to more closely follow the shoreline of the Tyne, serving the rapidly developing industries and communities, was authorised in 1871. It was built along a route "that consisted for the most part of tunnels, bridges, cuttings, retaining-walls, and embankments".

The branch line opened on 1 May 1879. The delay in opening the line reflected the scale of the engineering works required to build the many tunnels, cuttings and retaining walls. Despite being a loop line, the line was officially known as the Riverside Branch.

In the early 1900s, tramway competition caused a rapid decline in the number of passengers using the North Eastern Railway's local services in North Tyneside. Therefore, in 1904, the branch line was electrified, using a 600 V DC third-rail system.

== Demise and closure ==
Between 1909 and 1948, an hourly all-day service ran on the line. In the late 1940s, passenger services on the branch were reduced to peak hours only, catering primarily for commuter traffic from the shipyards along the River Tyne.

Byker was the first station on the Riverside Branch to close to passengers, on 5 April 1954. It was followed six years later, with the closure of St Anthonys on 12 September 1960.

Preceding station	Disused railways	Following station
Manors; Line and station closed	North Eastern Railway; Riverside Branch	St. Peters; Line and station closed
