= Royal Quays =

- Area
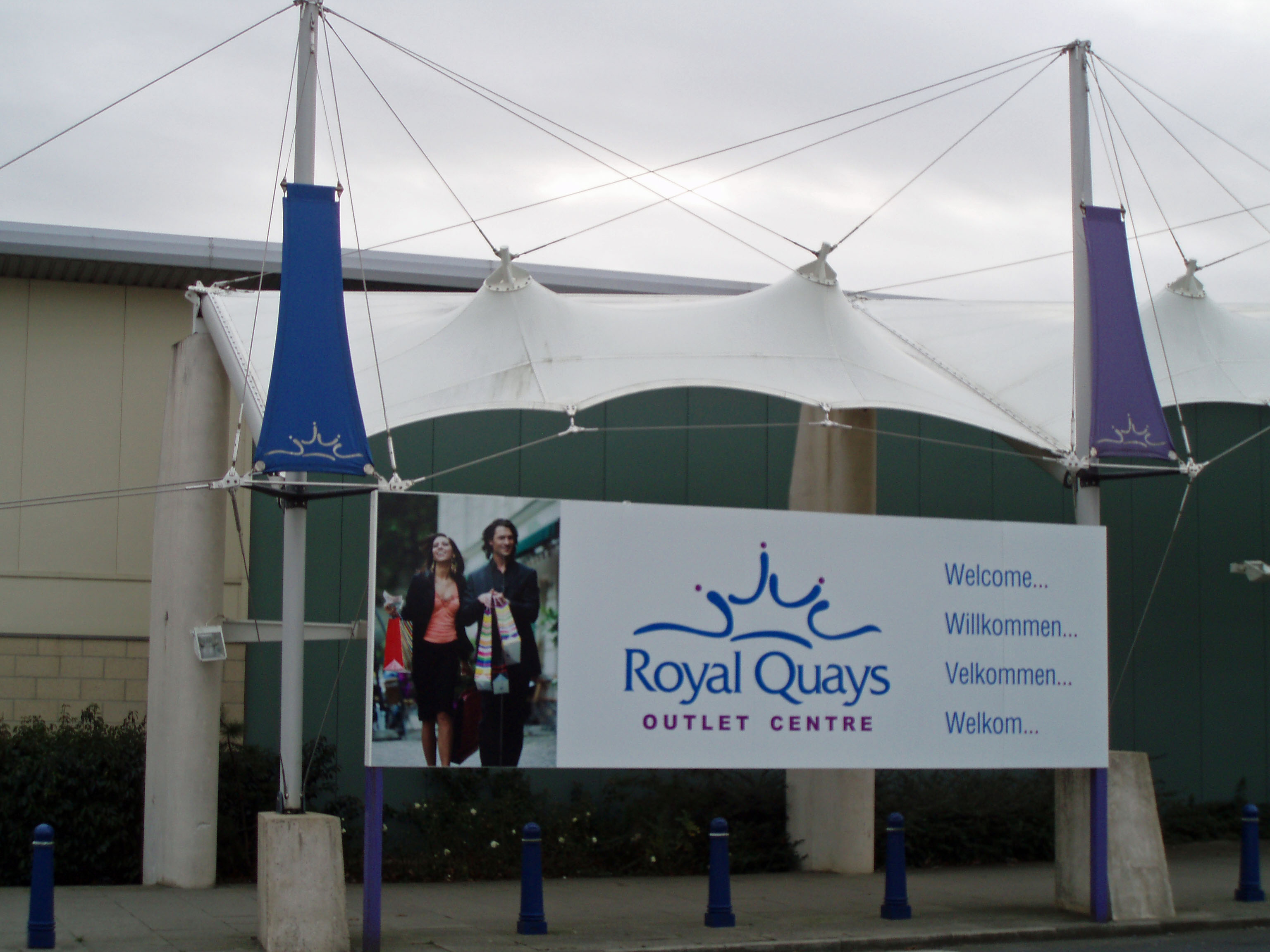

- Location in Tyne and Wear
- Coordinates: 54.993°N 1.461°W
- OS grid reference: NZ345666
- Sovereign state: United Kingdom
- Country: England
- District: Tyne and Wear

Royal Quays is an area of North Shields, North Tyneside, England, beside the River Tyne.

== History ==
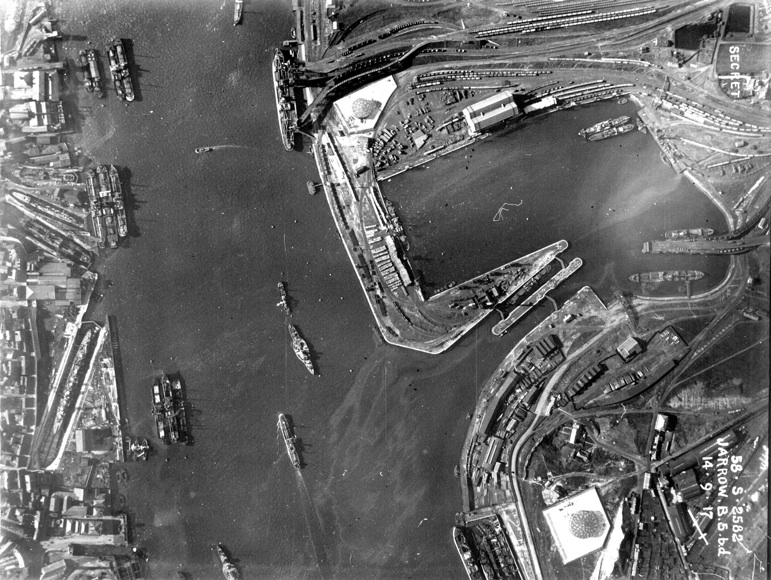
Albert Edward Dock in 1917

The development was built on the site of the Albert Edward Dock, which now houses the Royal Quays Marina. It includes the pre-existing North Shields International Ferry Terminal. The area was redeveloped by Tyne and Wear Development Corporation and renamed Royal Quays in 1990.

It was redeveloped with housing, a shopping centre, Brewers Fayre restaurant, large public parks (known as Redburn Dene and Chirton Dene Park) and a water park known as Wet n Wild. A Premier Inn hotel, sports centre, ten-pin bowling complex and a trampolining centre were also part of the development. In 2025, Wet n Wild, alongside the sports centre were demolished and are awaiting replacement.

== Transport ==
The nearest Metro stations are Meadow Well and Percy Main which with local bus routes 19, 319 and 317 serve the area. In addition to the North Shields International Ferry Terminal, cruise ships regularly dock at the Port of Tyne terminal. A car and lorry terminal is adjacent.

== Newcastle Quays Retail Park ==
Newcastle Quays Retail Park, formerly Royal Quays Outlet Centre, is an outlet centre in Royal Quays, North Shields.
