= Wallsend Metro station =

Tyne and Wear Metro station in North Tyneside

Wallsend
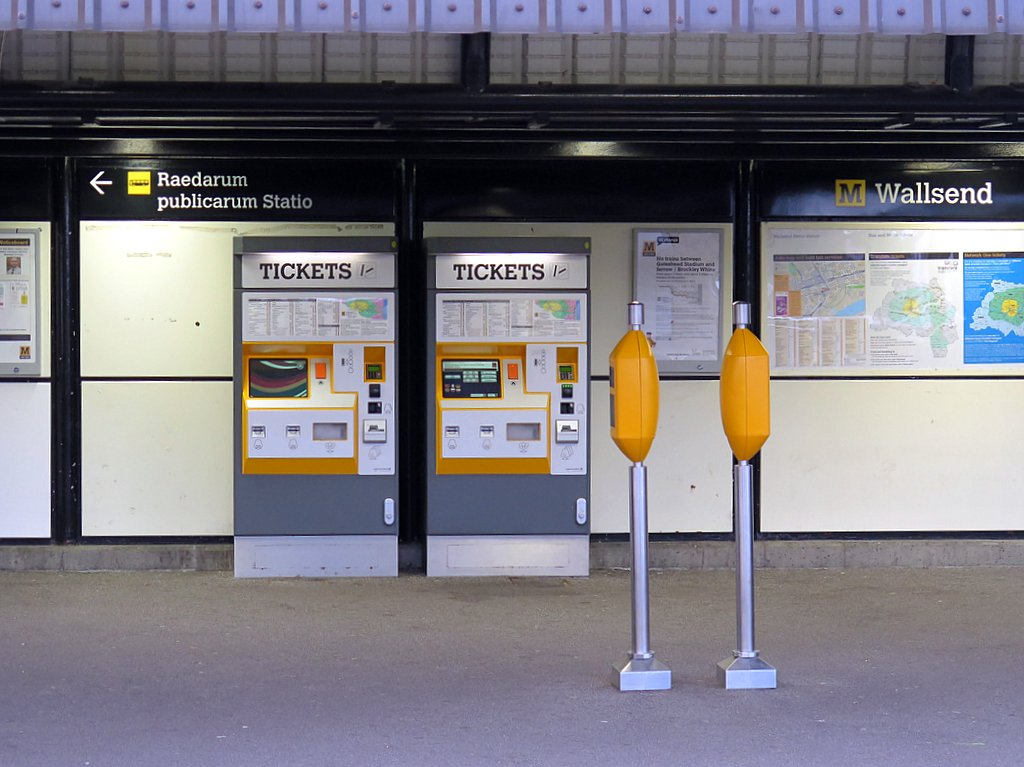

General information
- Location: Wallsend, North Tyneside; England
- Coordinates: 54°59′23″N 1°31′58″W
- Grid reference: NZ300662
- System: Tyne and Wear Metro station
- Transit authority: Tyne and Wear PTE
- Platforms: 2
- Tracks: 2
- Bus stands: 3

Construction
- Parking: 24 spaces
- Cycle facilities: 8 cycle pods
- Accessible: Step-free access to platform

Other information
- Station code: WSD
- Fare zone: B

History
- Original company: Newcastle and North Shields Railway
- Pre-grouping: North Eastern Railway
- Post-grouping: London and North Eastern Railway; British Rail (Eastern Region)

Key dates
- 22 June 1839: Opened as Carville
- 1864: Renamed Wallsend
- 11 August 1980: Closed for conversion
- 14 November 1982: Reopened

Passengers
- 2024/25: 1.052 million

Services
Preceding station	Tyne and Wear Metro	Following station
Hadrian Road towards South Shields via Whitley Bay	Yellow line	Walkergate towards St James
Location
- Location within Tyne and Wear

Wallsend (Latin: Segedunum) is a Tyne and Wear Metro station, serving the town of Wallsend, North Tyneside in Tyne and Wear, England. It joined the network on 14 November 1982, following the opening of the fourth phase of the network, between Tynemouth and St James via Wallsend.

== History ==
The station stands on the site of the former Wallsend station, which opened in 1839, as part of the Newcastle and North Shields Railway. This later became part of the North Tyneside Loop, served by the North Eastern Railway. Following closure for conversion in the early 1980s, the station was demolished and re-built.

Wallsend is the only station in the United Kingdom which has signage in Latin. This is a nod to the station's location, near to the Segedunum Roman Fort at the end of Hadrian's Wall.

== Facilities ==
Step-free access is available at all stations across the Tyne and Wear Metro network: ramps provide step-free access to both platforms at Wallsend. The station is equipped with ticket machines, sheltered waiting area, seating, next-train information displays, timetable posters, and an emergency help point on both platforms. Ticket machines accept payment with credit and debit card (including contactless payment), notes and coins. The station is also fitted with smartcard validators, like all stations across the network.

There is a small free car park available at the station, with 24 spaces. There is also provision for cycle parking: eight cycle pods are available.

== Services ==
As of April 2021, the station is served by up to five trains per hour on weekdays and Saturday, and up to four trains per hour during the evening and on Sunday.

== Bus station ==
Wallsend Bus Station opened in July 1982, preceding the adjacent Metro station. It is served by Go North East and Stagecoach North East's local bus services, with frequent routes serving Newcastle upon Tyne and North Tyneside. The bus station has three departure stands (lettered A–C), each of which is fitted with a waiting shelter, seating, next-bus information displays, and timetable posters. The bus station was refurbished in 2009 at a cost of £130,000.

== Art ==
Michael Pinsky's Pontis art project was commissioned for the station in 2003, and featured photographs of the local area, digitally altered so that words appeared in Latin. It has since been replaced by a new artwork, which consists of images of Hadrian's Wall, by photographer Graeme Peacock.
