= Newcastle and North Shields Railway =

Former English railway

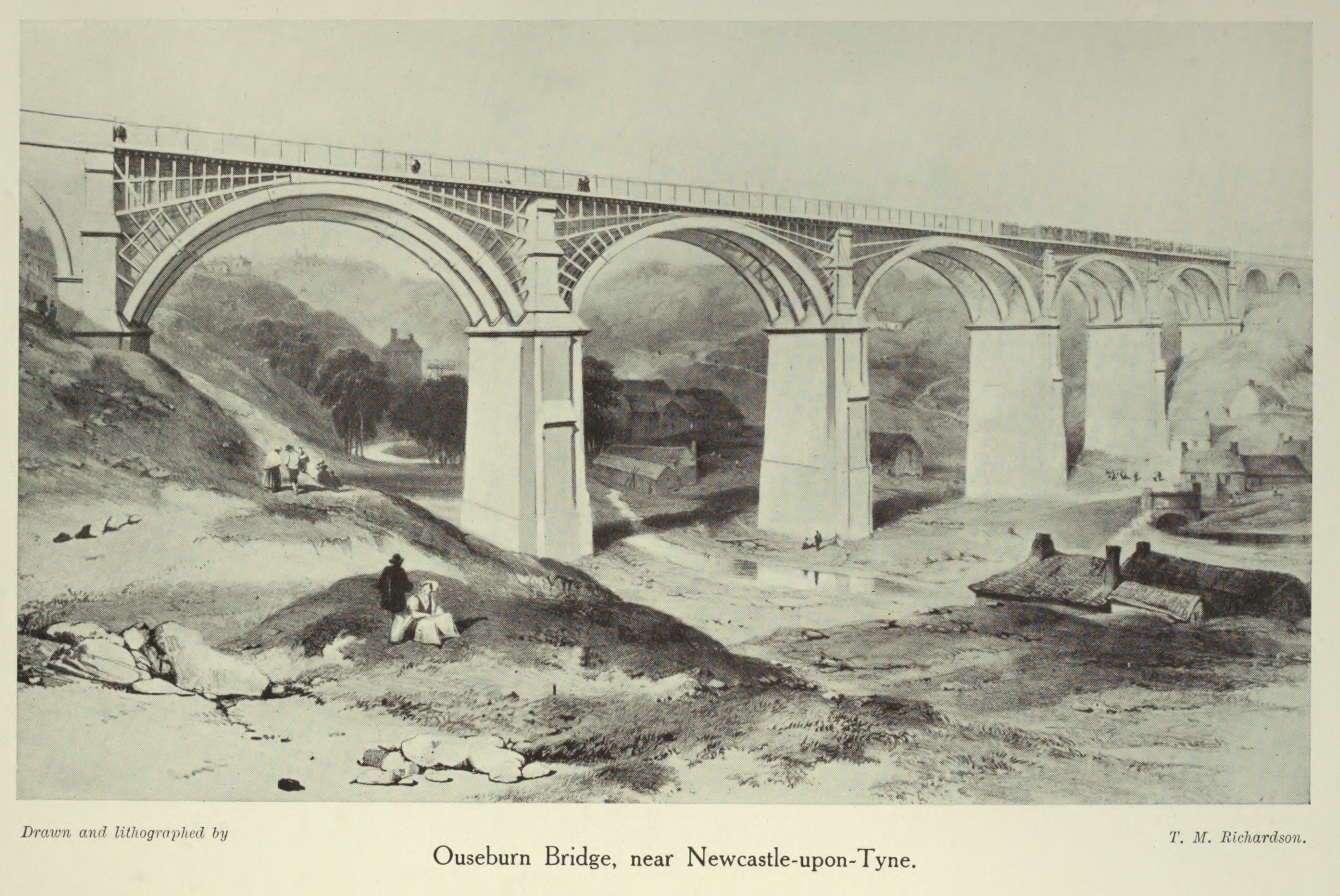
- Ouseburn Bridge, near Newcastle, built by the Newcastle and North Shields Railway in the 1830s using laminated timber arches on masonry piers, similar to the Wiebeking system used in Paris

Overview
- Dates of operation: 1839–1844
- Successor: Newcastle and Berwick Railway

Technical
- Track gauge: 4 ft 8 1/2 in (1,435 mm) standard gauge

The Newcastle and North Shields Railway opened in June 1839 from a temporary terminus in Carliol Square in Newcastle upon Tyne to North Shields. The railway was absorbed by the Newcastle and Berwick Railway in November 1844. The Newcastle and Berwick Railway was itself absorbed by the York, Newcastle and Berwick Railway, and this became part of the North Eastern Railway in 1854.

Tynemouth was served from 1847 and Newcastle Central replaced the original station in 1850. In 1882 the station at Tynemouth was replaced by a through station when the line and the former Blyth and Tyne Railway line were linked. The route was electrified in 1904 as part of the Tyneside Electrics programme.

== Origins ==
Newcastle-upon-Tyne and North Shields Railway Act 1836
- Act of Parliament
- Parliament of the United Kingdom
- Long title: An Act for making and maintaining a Railway from the Town of Newcastle-upon-Tyne in the County of the Town of Newcastle-upon-Tyne to North Shields in the County of Northumberland, with a Branch thereout in the County of Northumberland.
- Citation: 6 & 7 Will. 4. c. lxxvi

Dates
- Royal assent: 21 June 1836

Text of statute as originally enacted

A railway between Newcastle and North Shields was proposed in 1830, but was opposed in Newcastle by people who feared that the city docks would lose trade to the docks in North Shields, and by people in North Shields who feared local shops would lose trade when customers could travel to Newcastle and that no-one would holiday in North Shields if they could stay in Newcastle. Of the two proposed routes one was chosen in 1835, changed the following year so Tynemouth was on the main line rather than served by a branch. To compensate landowners for the lost income from wayleaves on coal carried on the existing wagonways, a toll of 3/4d (Note: A pre-decimal penny was worth in 1836 about the same as 41p in 2025.) a mile was agreed. The act of Parliament authorising the Newcastle and North Shields Railway (N&NSR), the Newcastle-upon-Tyne and North Shields Railway Act 1836 (6 & 7 Will. 4. c. lxxvi), received royal assent on 21 June 1836.

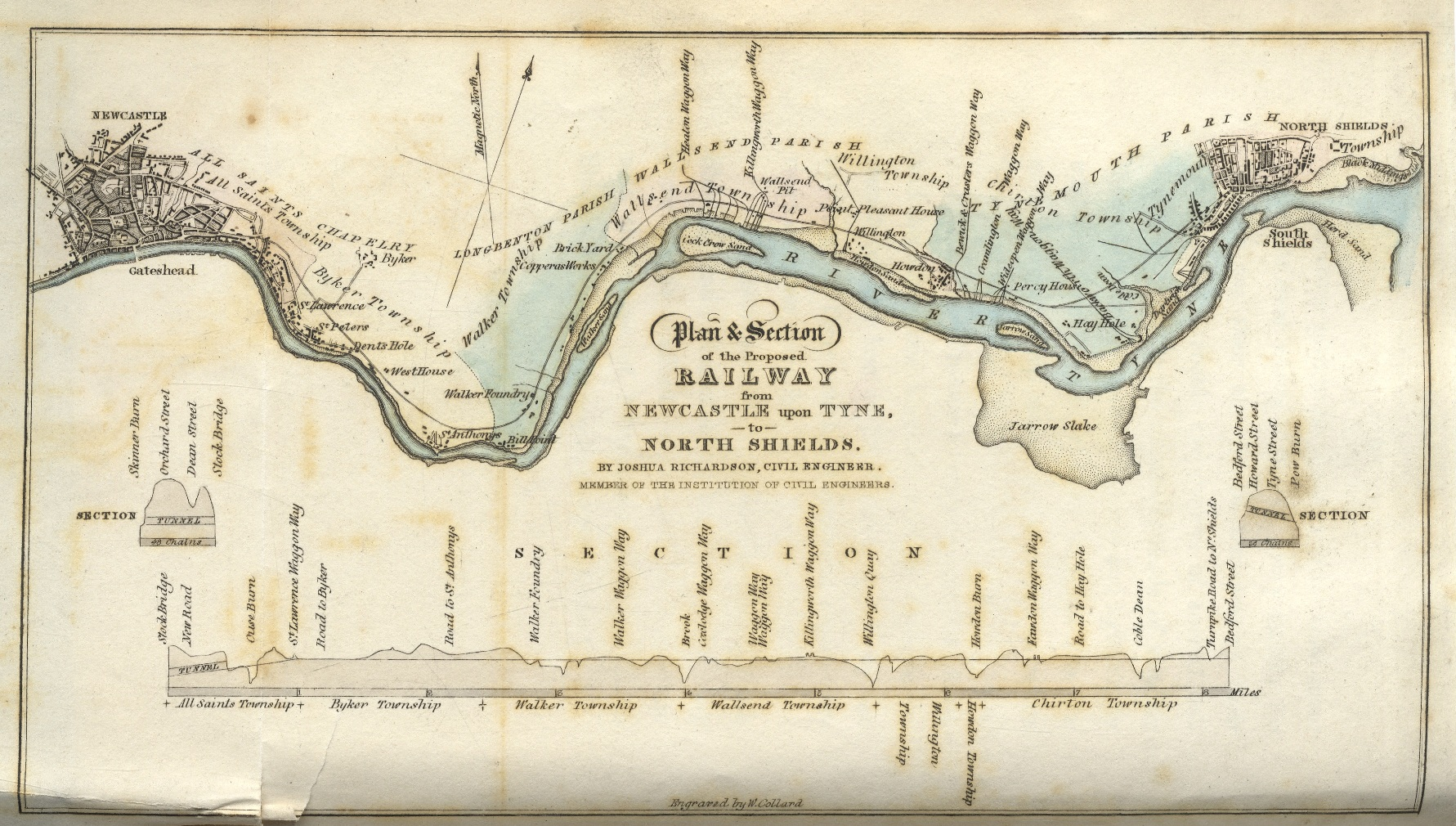
1834 Plan Newcastle to North Shields Railway etched by W Collard

After leaving the temporary terminus at Newcastle the railway passed through a short tunnel before crossing two viaducts built using laminated timber arches on masonry piers, similar to the Wiebeking system used on the Seine at Pont d'Ivry in Paris. The 918-foot (280 m) long Ouseburn Viaduct was built with five arches whereas the Willington Dene Viaduct was 1,048 feet (319 m) long and had seven arches. The railway opened on 18 June 1839 when two trains carried a total of 700 passengers on a return trip to a celebration in Tynemouth, which was interrupted by a violent thunderstorm that flooded the marquee. Public services started the next day, although Tynemouth was not served until 1847.

The average speed of express trains in 1841 was 31–34 miles per hour (50–55 km/h). Third-class carriages were painted light green, and the first was 20 feet 8 inches (6.30 m) long and 7 feet 9 inches (2.36 m) wide, did not have doors and carried 60 passengers. First-class carriages were painted crimson, maroon, and in one case a rich light scarlet claret edged with yellow and those for second-class passengers were light brown and vermilion. The railway was absorbed by the Newcastle and Berwick Railway in November 1844, although independent operations continued until a 14 1/2-mile (23.3 km) line north to Morpeth opened on 1 July 1847 from a junction from Heaton.

== Locomotives ==
Locomotive list

Name	Wheels	Builder	Date introduced	N&NSR no.	NER no.	Comments
St Vincent	2-2-0	Edward Bury and Company	1834	-	-	From Leeds and Selby Railway, 1838. Sold to Hartlepool Dock and Railway, 1840
Wellington	2-2-2	Robert Stephenson and Company	1839	-	153?	
Nelson	2-2-2	R & W Hawthorn	1839	-	150?	
Hotspur	2-2-2	R & W Hawthorn	1839	-	150?	
The Light	2-4-0	R & W Hawthorn	1839	-	151?	
Collingwood	0-4-2	Robert Stephenson and Company	1839	-	149?	
Exmouth	0-4-2	R & W Hawthorn	1840	-	152?	

Notes

1. N&NSR = Newcastle and North Shields Railway
2. NER = North Eastern Railway

== Legacy ==
The Newcastle and Berwick Railway was absorbed by the York, Newcastle and Berwick Railway, and this became part of the North Eastern Railway in 1854. The temporary terminus in Newcastle was replaced by Newcastle Central station in 1850. A 10 km (6 mi) loop via Walker, known as the Riverside Branch, was opened in 1879 and a through station (now Tynemouth Metro station) replaced the original N&NSR terminus, linking with the Blyth and Tyne Railway, in 1882. The line was electrified as part of the Tyneside Electrics programme, the new trains running in passenger service from 1904.

== The line today ==
Services were withdrawn from the Riverside branch on 23 July 1973 and it now has been converted into a footpath and cycle-path known as Hadrian's Way, forming part of both the C2C cycle route (National Cycle Network route 72) and the Hadrian's Wall National Trail.

In 1982 almost all of the main route (from a point just east of Heaton to Tynemouth and beyond) was converted to form part of the Tyne and Wear Metro Yellow line.

== Notes and references ==
=== Sources ===
- Allen, Cecil J. (1974) [1964]. The North Eastern Railway. Shepperton: Ian Allan. ISBN 0-7110-0495-1.
- Hoole, K. (1974). A Regional History of the Railways of Great Britain: Volume IV The North East. David & Charles. ISBN 0715364391.
- Tomlinson, William Weaver (1915). The North Eastern Railway: Its rise and development. Newcastle-upon-Tyne: Andrew Reid and Company.
