= Jack Smack =

- Born: August 8, ? Jyväskylä, Finland
- Origin: Suolahti, Keski-Suomi, Finland, nyk. Helsinki
- Genres: Rock, hard rock, punk rock, heavy metal, blues, pop
- Instruments: Guitar, Vocals, Bass, Baritone; Tokai Les Paul Custom guitars
- Labels: King Foo; Bad Habits Records; JVC Victor Japan; Playground Scandinavia; Dynamo Records; SOYUZ/UK/RUS
- Website: Official Private Line website

Jack Smack (born August 8, ? in Jyväskylä) is a Finnish rock musician. He is the guitarist/background vocalist/composer in the Helsinki based hard rock band called Private Line and also in the "party band" groups Evil Boys, Thunderbombs and Trabant. Jack Smack is also known as Japa, Captain Japa and Jack Leopard.

Jack joined in Private Line May 2002 when the founding member and guitarist Jari Huttunen left the band and joined in Finnish heavy metal act Timo Rautiainen & Trio Niskalaukaus.

After a couple of years break Private Line released a new single and music video Dead Decade from their forthcoming 3rd album with the same name. Album will be released in August 2011 by King Foo Entertainment. Music video was directed by Ville Lipiäinen in co-operation with Greenpeace. Private Line announced in May 2011 that they will start their tour in June 2011 including countries Finland, China and United States. Private Line has performed earlier including Finland in Japan, Russia, Germany, Italy, Switzerland, Austria, Sweden, Great-Britain and Spain.

Jack Smack hosted his own radio program called "Ultimate Rock 'N' Roll Show" since September 3, 2007 to August 2008 in Helsinki Lähiradio's 100,3 MHz channel with his host partner Joel "Sheriffi Jopi" Airaksinen. In the program Jack performed with the name "Captain Japa". Program consisted talk about music, daily subjects and artist interviews New York Dolls, Andy McCoy, Michael Monroe, Hardcore Superstar, Twisted Sister, HIM, Negative, Hybrid Children, Naked.

== Jack Smack guitars ==
- Tokai Les Paul Custom guitars

== Jack Smack discography ==
=== Albums ===
- Private Line - 21st Century Pirates (2004) - (Guitar/background vocals)
- Private Line - Evel Knievel Factor (2006) - (Guitar/background vocals)
- Private Line - Dead Decade (2011) - (Guitar/Baritone guitar/background vocals)

=== Other albums ===
- Klamydia - Piikkinä lihassa Klamydia 15v. (2003) (Guitar "Junkies Love" with Sammy Aaltonen & Eliaz from Private Line and Antti Anatomy & Sir Christus from Negative)
- Hybrid Children - Ghost Town Carnival (2004) - (Background vocals)
- Hybrid Children - Fight As One (2009) - (Background vocals "Motörbreath")
- Defuse - Bangkok Addiction (2010) - (Lead guitar "Overtake")

=== EP:s ===
- Private Line - Six Songs of Hellcity Trendkill (2002) - (Guitar/background vocals)

=== Singles ===
- Private Line - Forever and a Day (2004) - (Guitar/background vocals)
- Private Line - 1-800-Out-of-Nowhere (2004) - (Guitar/background vocals)
- Private Line - Already Dead (2004) - (Guitar/background vocals)
- Private Line - Broken Promised Land (2006) - (Guitar/background vocals)
- Private Line - Sound Advice (2007) - (Guitar/background vocals)
- Private Line - Dead Decade (2011) - (Guitar/background vocals)

=== Other releases ===
- Palmcut - All Explodes! (1998) - (Guitar/Vocals)
- Palmcut - Take 2: ACTION! (1999) - (Guitar/Vocals)
- Palmcut - Alright! (1999) - (Guitar/Vocals)
- Palmcut - Ready To Crash & Burn (2000) - (Guitar/Vocals)
- Kanu - Sua Haluan (1998) - (Bass/background vocals)
- Kanu - Lupaus Huomiseen (1998) - (Bass/background vocals)
- Kanu - Kaikki Menneet (1999) - (Bass/background vocals)
- Rockers Unite! - Out Of Our Way / Shakin' (2002) - (Guitar/Vocals)
- Private Line - More (11/2007) Pepsi Max campaign song, original song by The Black Eyed Peas

=== Music videos ===
- Private Line - Forever and a Day (2/2004)
- Private Line - 1-800-Out-of-Nowhere(5/2004)
- Private Line - Broken Promised Land (8/2006)
- Private Line - Sound Advice (1/2007)
- Private Line - Dead Decade (4/2011)
- Private Line - Deathroll Casino (4/2012)

=== Compilations ===
- Palmcut - Hey! It's Over, The Spirits Of The New Age - compilation-CD (1999)
- Private Line - Broken Promised Land, Rock2006.fi - Vuoden Kovimmat Rockhitit (2006)
- Private Line - Broken Promised Land, Tuhma Rock-kokoelma Vol.1 (2007)
- Private Line - Broken Promised Land, Mama Trash Family Artists Volume One (2007)
- Private Line - Broken Promised Land, Sweden Rock Magazine Vol.43 (2007)
- Private Line - He's A Whore (Cheap Trick-cover), Mama Trash Family Artists Volume 2 (2008)

=== Movie soundtracks ===
- Private Line - Sleep Tight Levottomat 3 - Movie Soundtrack (2004)
- Private Line - Sound Advice V2 - Jäätynyt Enkeli (2007)
