= List of stage names: C =

This list of stage names lists names used by those in the entertainment industry, alphabetically by their stage name's surname (or the best approximation) followed by the given name (or the best approximation) where the surname begins with "C". One-word stage names are presented in List of one-word stage names.

Stage name	Birth name	Life	Notability	Notes
Melanie C	Melanie Jayne Chisholm	1974–	English singer-songwriter and media personality (Spice Girls)	
Pimp C	Chad Lamont Butler	1973–2007	American rapper and producer (UGK)	
Vitamin C	Colleen Ann Fitzpatrick	1972–	American singer-songwriter and actress	
Bruce Cabot	Étienne de Pelissier Bujac Jr.	1904–1972	American actor	
Susan Cabot	Harriet Pearl Shapiro	1927–1986	American actress	
Michael Cacoyannis	Mihalis Kakogiannis	1922–2011	Greek-Cypriot director, writer, producer and actor	Credited as Michael Cacoyannis or Michael Yannis
Rita Cadillac	Nicole Yasterbelsky	1936–1995	French singer, dancer and actress	
Daniel Caesar	Ashton Dumar Norwill Simmonds	1995–	Canadian singer-songwriter	
Nicolas Cage	Nicolas Kim Coppola	1964–	American actor and producer	
Alan Caillou	Alan Samuel Lyle-Smythe	1914–2006	English author, actor and screenwriter	
Howard Caine	Howard Cohen	1926–1993	American character actor	
Michael Caine	Maurice Joseph Micklewhite	1933–	English actor	
Louis Calhern	Carl Henry Vogt	1895–1956	American actor	
Rory Calhoun	Francis Timothy McCown	1922–1999	American actor	
Randy California	Randy Craig Wolfe	1951–1997	American musician, singer and songwriter (Spirit)	
K Callan	Katherine Elizabeth Borman	1936–	American author and actress	
Michael Callan	Martin Calinoff	1935–2022	American actor	
Charlie Callas	Charles Callias	1924–2011	American actor and comedian	
Maria Callas	Sophie Cecilia Kalos	1923–1977	American-Greek singer	Sophie Cecilia Kalos on her New York birth certificate; christened Maria Anna Cecilia Sophia Kalogeropoulou
Catherine Calvert	Catherine Cassidy	1890–1971	American singer	
Phyllis Calvert	Phyllis Hannah Bickle	1915–2002	English actress	
Steve Calvert	William Seeger	1916–1991	American actor and make-up artist	
Basil Cameron	Basil George Cameron Hindenberg	1884–1975	English conductor and musician	
Dove Cameron	Chloe Celeste Hosterman	1996–	American singer and actress	
Rod Cameron	Nathan Roderick Cox	1910–1983	Canadian actor	
Chan Canasta	Chananel Mifelew	1920–1999	Polish-English magician	
Dinah Cancer	Mary Ann Sims	1960–	American singer (45 Grave)	
Nobutoshi Canna	Nobutoshi Hayashi	1968–	Japanese voice actor	
Dyan Cannon	Samille Diane Friesen	1937–	American actress, filmmaker and editor	
Freddy Cannon	Frederick Anthony Picariello Jr.	1936–2026	American singer	
Tommy Cannon	Thomas Derbyshire	1938–	English comedian and actor (Cannon & Ball)	
Eddie Cantor	Isidore Itzkowitz	1892–1964	American comedian, actor and singer	
Blu Cantrell	Tiffany Cobb	1978–	American singer-songwriter	
Jil Caplan	Valentine Guilen	1965–	French singer and songwriter	
Truman Capote	Truman Streckfus Persons	1924–1984	American novelist, screenwriter, playwright and actor	
Ahna Capri	Anna Marie Nanasi	1944–2010	American actress	
June Caprice	Helen Elizabeth Lawson	1895–1936	American actress	
Irene Cara	Irene Cara Escalera	1959–2022	American singer-songwriter and actress	
Ora Carew	Ora Whytock	1891–1955	American actress	
Joyce Carey	Joyce Lilian Lawrence	1898–1993	English actress	
Mary Carey	Mary Ellen Cook	1980–	American former adult film actress and model	
Michele Carey	Michele Lee Henson	1942–2018	American actress	
Ron Carey	Ronald Joseph Cicenia	1935–2007	American actor	
Victor Carin	Vitorio Zaccarini	1932–1981	Scottish-Italian actor	
Carl Carl	Karl Andreas Bernbrunn	1787–1854	German actor and director	
Frankie Carle	Francis Nunzio Carlone	1903–2001	American musician and bandleader	
Kitty Carlisle	Catherine Conn	1910–2007	American actress, singer and television personality	
Mary Carlisle	Gwendolyn Witter	1914–2018	American actress, singer and dancer	
Bun E. Carlos	Brad Carlson	1950–	American musician (Cheap Trick)	
Don Carlos	Euvin McCallus Spencer	1952–	Jamaican singer and composer	Also known as Don McCarlos
Shy Carlos	Schirin Grace Sigrist	1995–	Filipina actress and model	
Timothy Carlton	Timothy Carlton Congdon Cumberbatch	1939–	English actor	
Jewel Carmen	Florence Lavina Quick	1897–1984	American actress	
Robert Carmine	Robert Coppola Schwartzman	1982–	American filmmaker, director, screenwriter, actor and musician (Rooney)	
Judy Carne	Joyce Audrey Botterill	1939–2015	English actress and comedienne	
Alan Carney	David John Boughal	1909–1973	American comedian and actor (Brown and Carney)	
Uncle Don Carney	Howard Rice	1896–1954	American radio host	
Cindy Carol	Annette Carol Sydes	1944–	American actress	
Martine Carol	Marie-Louise Jeanne Nicolle Mourer	1920–1967	French actress	
Sister Carol	Carol Theresa East	1959–	Jamaican-American singer	Also known as Black Cinderella and Mother Culture
Sue Carol	Evelyn Jean Lederer	1906–1982	American actress	
Bob Carolgees	Robert Frederick Johnson	1948–	English entertainer	
Melinda Caroll	Linda Carol Smith	1952–	American singer (Girl Scouts)	
Allan Carr	Allan Solomon	1937–1999	American producer and manager	
Cathy Carr	Angelina Cordovano	1936–1988	American singer	
Charmian Carr	Charmian Farnon	1942–2016	American actress	
Darleen Carr	Darlene Farnon	1950–	American actress, singer and voice-over artist	Also known as Darlene Carr and Darleen Drake
Eric Carr	Paul Charles Caravello	1950–1991	American musician (Kiss)	Also known as The Fox
Jane Carr	Dorothy Henrietta Brunstrom	1909–1957	English actress	
Vikki Carr	Florencia Vicenta de Casillas-Martinez Cardona	1940–	American singer	
Raffaella Carrà	Raffaella Maria Roberta Pelloni	1943–2021	Italian singer, dancer, actress and model	
Asia Carrera	Jessica Steinhauser	1973–	American former pornographic actress	
Barbara Carrera	Barbara Kingsbury Carrera	1945–	American actress and model	
Tia Carrere	Althea Rae Duhinio Janairo	1967–	American actress, singer and former model	
Regina Carrol	Regina Carol Gelfan	1943–1992	American actress and singer	
Diahann Carroll	Carol Diann Johnson	1935–2019	American actress	
Janet Carroll	Janet Thiese	1940–2012	American character actress	
Jean Carroll	Celine Zeigman	1911–2010	French-American actress and comedienne	
Joan Carroll	Joan Felt	1931–2016	American child actress	
John Carroll	Julian LaFaye	1906–1979	American actor	
Nancy Carroll	Ann Veronica Lahiff	1903–1965	American actress	
Ronnie Carroll	Ronald Cleghorn	1934–2015	Northern Irish singer	
Elisabeth Carron	Elisabetta Caradonna	1922–2016	American operatic soprano	
Jasper Carrott	Robert Davis	1945–	English entertainer and television personality	
Jeannie Carson	Jean Shufflebottom	1928–2022	English retired comedienne, actress, singer and dancer	
Jenny Lou Carson	Virginia Lucille Overstake	1915–1978	American country singer-songwriter	
Alex Carter	Apostolos Apostolopoulos	1963–	Canadian actor	
Betty Carter	Lillie Mae Jones	1929–1998	American jazz singer	Also known as Lorraine Carter and Betty Bebop
Jack Carter	Jack Chakrin	1922–2015	American comedian, actor and television presenter	
Nell Carter	Nell Ruth Hardy	1948–2003	American singer and actress	
Nina Carter	Penelope Jane Mallett	1952–	English former model (Page 3)	
Terry Carter	John Everett DeCoste	1928–2024	American actor and filmmaker	
Anna Carteret	Annabelle Wilkinson	1942–	English actress	
Playboi Carti	Jordan Terrell Carter	1995/1996–	American rapper	
Beatriz Carvajal	Beatriz Pla Navarro	1949–	Spanish actress	
Charlie Carver	Charles Carver Martensen	1988–	American actor	
Max Carver	Robert Maxwell Martensen Jr.	1988–	American actor	
Heron Carvic	Geoffrey Richard William Harris	1913–1980	English actor and writer	
Ivan Caryll	Félix Marie Henri Tilkin	1861–1921	Belgian composer	
Maya Casabianca	Margalit Azran	1940–2018	French-Israeli singer	
Gerald Casale	Gerald Vincent Pizzute	1948–	American musician (Devo)	Also known as Jerry Casale
Moria Casán	Ana María Casanova	1946–	Argentine actress and television personality	
Sue Casey	Suzanne Marguerite Philips	1926–2019	American actress	
DJ Casper	Willie Perry Jr.	1965–2023	American DJ and songwriter	Also known as Mr. C The Slide Man
Dave Cash	David Charles Wish	1942–2016	English radio presenter	
Cécile Cassel	Cécile Crochon	1982–	French actress and singer	
Jean-Pierre Cassel	Jean-Pierre Crochon	1932–2007	French actor	
Vincent Cassel	Vincent Crochon	1966–	French actor	
Wally Cassell	Oswaldo Silvestri Trippilini Rolando Vincenza Castellano (or Osvaldo Tripolini Ronaldo Vincennes Castelleno)	1912–2015	Italian-American character actor	
Hopalong Cassidy	William Lawrence Boyd	1895–1972	American actor	
Patricia Castell	Ovidia Paramidani Padín	1926–2013	Argentine actress	
Peggie Castle	Peggy Thomas Blair	1927–1973	American actress	
Vernon Castle	William Blyth	1887–1918	English ballroom dancer	
William Castle	William Schloss	1914–1977	American director, producer, screenwriter and actor	
Shorty Castro	Israel Castro Vélez	1928–2018	Puerto Rican comedian and actor	
Doja Cat	Amala Dlamini	1995–	American rapper, singer and songwriter	
Super Cat	William Maragh	1963–	Jamaican deejay	
C. C. Catch	Caroline Müller	1964–	Dutch-German pop singer	
Georgina Cates	Clare Woodgate	1975–	English actress	
Andy Cato	Andrew Coecup	1972–	English musician, record producer and DJ (Groove Armada and Weekend Players)	
Caroline Catz	Caroline Caplan	1969–	English actress	
Emma Caulfield	Emma Chukker	1973–	American actress	
Maxwell Caulfield	Maxwell Newby	1959–	British-American actor	
Elise Cavanna	Alyse Seeds	1902–1963	American actress, dancer and comedienne	Also known as Elise Seeds, Elise Armitage and Elise Welton
André Cayatte	Marcel Truc	1909–1989	French filmmaker, writer and lawyer	
Huw Ceredig	Huw Jones	1942–2011	Welsh actor	
Marilyn Chambers	Marilyn Ann Briggs	1952–2009	American pornographic actress	
Alain Chamfort	Alain Joseph Yves Le Govic	1949–	French singer	
Jackie Chan	Chan Kong-sang	1954–	American actor, filmmaker and martial artist	Cheng Long was a Chinese screen name
Rose Chan	Chan Chang	1925–1987	Chinese-Malaysian cabaret dancer	
James Chance	James Siegfried	1953–2024	American singer and saxophonist	Also known as James White
Gene Chandler	Eugene Drake Dixon	1937–	American singer, songwriter and music producer	
Jeff Chandler	Ira Grossel	1918–1961	American actor, film producer and singer	
Lane Chandler	Robert Clinton Oakes	1899–1972	American actor	
Lorraine Chandler	Ermastine Lewis	1946–2020	American singer	
Keshia Chanté	Keshia Chanté Harper	1988–	Canadian singer-songwriter, actress and television personality	
Saul Chaplin	Saul Kaplan	1912–1997	American composer and musical director	
Judith Chapman	Judith Shepard	1951–	American actress	
Annette Charles	Annette Cardona	1948–2011	American actress and dancer	
Bobby Charles	Robert Charles Guidry	1938–2010	American singer-songwriter	
Ray Charles (musician, born 1918)	Charles Raymond Offenberg	1918–2015	American musician	
Ray Charles (musician, born 1930)	Ray Charles Robinson	1930–2004	American singer and songwriter	
Nikki Charm	Shannon Eaves	Unknown	American pornographic actress	
Bailey Chase	Bailey Chase Luetgert	1972–	American actor	
Charley Chase	Charles Joseph Parrott	1893–1940	American comedian and actor	
Cheryl Chase	Cheryl Christine Hudock	1958–	American actress and children's book author	
Daniel Chatto	Daniel Chatto St George Sproule	1957–	Member of the British royal family, artist and former actor	
Tom Chatto	Thomas Sproule	1920–1982	English actor	
Michael Che	Michael Che Campbell	1983–	American comedian and actor	
Chubby Checker	Ernest Evans	1941–	American singer and dancer	
Richard Cheese	Mark Davis	Unknown	American actor, comedian and singer (Richard Cheese & Lounge Against The Machine)	
Micheline Cheirel	Micheline Truyen	1917–2002	French actress	
Olga Chekhova	Olga Konstantinovna Knipper	1897–1980	Russian-German actress	
Cut Chemist	Lucas MacFadden	1972–	American DJ and record producer	
Sammi Cheng	Cheng Sau-man	1972–	Hong Kong singer and actress	
Arthur Chesney	Arthur William Kellaway	1881–1949	English character actor	
Philip Chevron	Philip Ryan	1957–2013	Irish singer-songwriter and musician (The Pogues and The Radiators from Space)	
Desmond Child	John Charles Barrett	1953–	American songwriter and producer	
Kid Chocolate	Eligio Sardiñas Montalvo	1910–1988	Cuban boxer	
Annabel Chong	Grace Quek	1972–	Singaporean former pornographic actress	
Stephen Chow	Chiau Sing-chi	1962–	Hong Kong filmmaker, former actor and comedian	
Lil' Chris	Christopher James Hardman	1990–2015	English singer-songwriter, actor and television personality	
Marilyn Chris	Marilyn Miller	1938–	American actress	
mc chris	Christopher Brendan Ward IV	1975–	American actor, rapper and comedian	
Linda Christian	Blanca Rosa Henrietta Stella Welter Vorhauer	1923–2011	Mexican actress	
Lou Christie	Lugee Alfredo Giovanni Sacco	1943–	American singer-songwriter	
Tony Christie	Anthony Fitzgerald	1943–	English singer	
Virginia Christine	Virginia Christine Ricketts	1920–1996	American actress	
Dennis Christopher	Dennis Christopher Carrelli	1950–	American actor	
Sir Christus	Jukka Kristian Mikkonen	1978–2017	Finnish musician (Negative)	
Ann Christy	Gladys Cronin	1905–1987	American actress	
June Christy	Shirley Luster	1925–1990	American singer	Also known as Sharon Leslie
Barrelhouse Chuck	Harvey Charles Goering	1958–2016	American musician, singer and songwriter	
Barry Chuckle	Barry David Elliott	1944–2018	English comedian and actor (Chuckle Brothers)	
Paul Chuckle	Paul Harman Elliott	1947–	English comedian and actor (Chuckle Brothers)	
Babz Chula	Barbara Ellen Zuckerman	1946–2010	American-Canadian actress	
Gillian Chung	Chung Tik-shan	1981–	Hong Kong actress and singer (Twins)	Also known as Chung Yan-tung; later changed her name to Chung Ka-lai
Thomas Haden Church	Thomas Richard McMillen	1960–	American actor	
Blac Chyna	Angela White	1988–	American model, television personality, rapper and socialite	
Avalanche City	Dave Baxter	Unknown	New Zealand musician	
Louis C.K.	Louis Szekely	1967–	American comedian, actor, producer and writer	
Jany Clair	Jany Guillaume	1938–	French retired actress	
René Clair	René-Lucien Chomette	1898–1981	French filmmaker and writer	
Bernice Claire	Bernice Jahnigen	1906–2003	American singer and actress	
Ina Claire	Ina Fagan	1893–1985	American actress	
Diane Clare	Diane Olga Claire Georgine Dirsztay	1938–2013	English actress	
Mary Clare	Mary Clare Absalom	1892–1970	English actress	
Buddy Clark	Samuel Goldberg	1912–1949	American singer	
Dane Clark	Bernhardt Zanvilevitz	1912–1998	American character actor	
Susan Clark	Nora Golding	1943–	Canadian actress	
Bobbie Clarke	Robert William Woodman	1940–2014	English musician (Vince Taylor and the Playboys)	
Gary Clarke	Clarke Frederick L'Amoreaux	1933–	American actor	
Vince Clarke	Vincent John Martin	1960–	English musician and songwriter (Erasure)	
Robert Clary	Robert Widerman	1926–2022	French actor	
Jean Claudio	Claude Daniel Robert Martin	1927–1992	French actor	
Andrew Dice Clay	Andrew Clay Silverstein	1957–	American comedian and actor	
Judy Clay	Judith Grace Guions	1938–2001	American singer	
Philippe Clay	Philippe Mathevet	1927–2007	French singer and actor	
David Clayton-Thomas	David Henry Thomsett	1941–	Canadian musician, singer and songwriter (Blood, Sweat & Tears)	
Julien Clerc	Paul-Alain Auguste Leclerc	1947–	French singer-songwriter	
Jimmy Cliff	James Chambers	1944–2025	Jamaican musician, singer and actor	
Scott Clifton	Scott Clifton Snyder	1984–	American actor	
Patsy Cline	Virginia Patterson Hensley	1932–1963	American singer, songwriter and pianist	
Art Clokey	Arthur Charles Farrington	1921–2010	American animator, director and producer	
Angus Cloud	Conor Angus Cloud Hickey	1998–2023	American actor	
June Clyde	Ina Parton	1909–1987	American actress, singer and dancer	
Phyllis Coates	Gypsie Ann Evarts Stell	1927–2023	American actress	
Lee J. Cobb	Leo Jacoby	1911–1976	American actor	
Mad Cobra	Ewart Everton Brown	1968–	Jamaican dancehall musician	
I Blame Coco	Eliot Paulina Sumner	1990–	English singer, songwriter and actor	
Iron Eyes Cody	Espera Oscar de Corti	1904–1999	American actor	
Lew Cody	Louis Joseph Côté	1884–1934	American actor	
Alma Cogan	Alma Cohen	1932–1966	English singer	
Ian Cognito	Paul John Barbieri	1958–2019	English comedian	
Claudette Colbert	Émilie Claudette Chauchoin	1903–1996	American actress	
Anita Colby	Anita Counihan	1914–1992	American model and actress	
Clay Cole	Albert Franklin Rucker Jr.	1938–2010	American television personality and disc jockey	
J. Cole	Jermaine Lamarr Cole	1985–	American rapper and record producer	
Nat King Cole	Nathaniel Adams Coles	1919–1965	American singer, musician and actor	
Cy Coleman	Seymour Kaufman	1929–2004	American composer, songwriter and musician	
Constance Collier	Laura Constance Hardie	1878–1955	English actress	
John Collin	John Colin Smith	1928–1987	English actor	
Jo Collins	Janet Canoy	1945–2010	American actress and model	
John D. Collins	John Christopher Dixon	1942–	English actor	
Misha Collins	Dmitri Tippens Krushnic	1974–	American actor	
June Collyer	Dorothea Heermance	1906–1968	American actress	
Johnny Colt	Charles Brandt	1968–	American musician (Lynyrd Skynyrd and The Black Crowes)	
Jessi Colter	Mirriam Johnson	1943–	American country singer	
Ellar Coltrane	Ellar Coltrane Kinney Salmon	1994–	American actor	
Robbie Coltrane	Anthony Robert McMillan	1950–2022	Scottish actor	
Franché Coma	Frank Licata	1957–	American musician (Misfits)	
Aaron Cometbus	Aaron Elliot	1968–	American musician and songwriter	
MC Bat Commander	Christian Richards Jacobs	1972–	American musician, television producer and actor	
Henry Compton	Charles Mackenzie	1805–1877	English actor	
Lige Conley	Elijah Crommie	1897–1937	American actor	Also known as Lige Crommie
Chris Connor	Mary Jean Loutsenhizer	1927–2009	American jazz singer	
Robert Conrad	Conrad Robert Falk	1935–2020	American actor and singer	
William Conrad	John William Cann Jr.	1920–1994	American actor, producer and director	
Eddie Constantine	Israel Constantine	1913–1993	American singer, actor and entertainer	
Michael Constantine	Gus Efstratiou	1927–2021	American actor	
Richard Conte	Nicholas Conte	1910–1975	American actor	
Albert Conti	Albert Maroica Blasius Franz Maria	1887–1967	Austrian-American actor	Held a title of nobility (Ritter Conti von Cedassamare)
Connie Converse	Elizabeth Converse	1924–1974 (disappeared)	American singer-songwriter	
Karla Conway	Karla Jo Musacchia	1946–	American model and artist	Now uses the name Sachi
Russ Conway	Trevor Herbert Stanford	1925–2000	English musician and composer	
Russ Conway	Russell Zink	1913–2009	Canadian-American actor	
Tom Conway	Thomas Charles Sanders	1904–1967	English actor	
Keith Coogan	Keith Eric Mitchell	1970–	American actor	
Carole Cook	Mildred Frances Cook	1924–2023	American actress	
Tré Cool	Frank Edwin Wright III	1972–	American musician (Green Day)	
Alice Cooper	Vincent Damon Furnier	1948–	American musician	
Dion Cooper	Dion Cuiper	1993–	Dutch singer-songwriter	
Gary Cooper	Frank James Cooper	1901–1961	American actor	
Pat Cooper	Pasquale Vito Caputo	1929–2023	American actor and comedian	
Joan Copeland	Joan Maxine Miller	1922–2022	American actress	
David Copperfield	David Seth Kotkin	1956–	American magician	
Billy Corben	William Cohen	1978–	American documentary film director	
Glenn Corbett	Glenn Edwin Rothenburg	1933–1993	American actor	
Alex Cord	Alexander Viespi Jr.	1933–2021	American actor	
Mara Corday	Marilyn Joan Watts	1930–2025	American model and actress	
Henry Corden	Henry Cohen	1920–2005	Canadian-American actor	
Jeff Corey	Arthur Zwerling	1914–2002	American actor	
Jill Corey	Norma Speranza	1935–2021	American pop singer	
Chencho Corleone	Orlando Javier Valle Vega	1979–	Puerto Rican singer, songwriter and record producer	
Don Cornell	Luigi Francisco Varlaro	1919–2004	American singer	
Lydia Cornell	Lydia Korniloff	1953–	American actress	
Isabela Corona	Refugio Pérez Frías	1913–1993	Mexican actress	
Brent Corrigan	Sean Lockhart	1986–	American actor	Also known as Fox Ryder
Ray "Crash" Corrigan	Raymond Benitz	1902–1976	American actor	
Tony Corsari	André Parengh	1926–2011	Belgian television presenter	
Bud Cort	Walter Cox	1948–	American actor	
Joaquín Cortés	Joaquín Pedraja Reyes	1969–	Spanish dancer	
Dave "Baby" Cortez	David Clowney	1938–	American musician	
Ricardo Cortez	Jacob Krantz	1900–1977	American actor and film director	
Howard Cosell	Howard Cohen	1918–1995	American sports journalist, broadcaster and author	
Frankie Cosmos	Greta Simone Kline	1994–	American musician and singer-songwriter	
Diosa Costello	Juana de Dios Castrello	1913–2013	Puerto Rican entertainer, performer and producer	
Elvis Costello	Declan MacManus	1954–	English-singer songwriter and record producer	
Lou Costello	Louis Cristillo	1906–1959	American comedian and actor (Abbott & Costello)	
Antony Cotton	Antony Dunn	1975–	English actor and comedian	
Josie Cotton	Josie Jones	1956–	American singer and songwriter	
Desireé Cousteau	Deborah Clearbranch	1956–	American pornographic actress	
Jane Cowl	Grace Bailey	1883–1950	American actress and playwright	
Peter Coyote	Rachmil Cohon	1941–	American actor, director, screenwriter, author and narrator	
Carl Crack	Karl Böhm	1971–2001	Swazi-German musician (Atari Teenage Riot)	
James Craig	James Meador	1912–1985	American actor	
Michael Craig	Michael Gregson	1929–	English actor and screenwriter	
Thomas Craig	Craig Thompson	1962–	English actor	
Harry Crane	Harry Kravitsky	1914–1999	American comedy writer	
Les Crane	Lesley Gary Stein	1933–2008	American radio announcer and television talk show host	
Norma Crane	Norma Anna Bella Zuckerman	1928–1973	American actress	
Phyllis Crane	Phyllis Francis	1914–1982	Canadian-American actress	
Darby Crash	Jan Beahm	1958–1980	American singer (Germs)	
Joan Crawford	Lucille LeSueur	1905/1906–1977	American actress	
Michael Crawford	Michael Patrick Smith	1942–	English actor	
Kid Creole	Thomas August Darnell Browder	1950–	American musician, singer and songwriter (Dr. Buzzard's Original Savannah Band and Kid Creole and the Coconuts	
Kidd Creole	Nathaniel Glover	1960–	American rapper	
Quentin Crisp	Denis Charles Pratt	1908–1999	English actor and writer	
Peter Criss	George Peter John Criscuola	1945–	American musician (Kiss)	
Linda Cristal	Marta Moya Burges	1931–2020	Argentine actress	
Richard Cromwell	LeRoy Melvin Radabaugh	1910–1960	American actor	
KXNG Crooked	Dominick Antron Wickliffe	1976–	American rapper (Slaughterhouse)	Formerly known as Crooked I
B.J. Crosby	Joanne Crayton	1952–2015	American jazz singer and actress	Also known as Lady B.J.
Chris Cross	Christopher Alfred Goode	1989–	English magician	
Christopher Cross	Christopher Charles Geppert	1951–	American singer-songwriter and musician	
Big Boy Crudup	Arthur William Crudup	1905–1974	American musician and blues singer-songwriter	
Beckii Cruel	Rebecca Anne Flint	1995–	English YouTuber, singer, and dancer	
Taio Cruz	Adetayo Onile-Ere	1980–	English singer-songwriter and record producer	
Ice Cube	O'Shea Jackson	1969–	American rapper, actor and filmmaker	
Smiley Culture	David Victor Emmanuel	1963–2011	British reggae singer and deejay	
Irving Cummings	Irving Caminsky	1888–1959	American actor and director	
Susan Cummings	Gerda Susanne Tafel	1930–2016	German-American actress	
Grace Cunard	Harriet Mildred Jeffries	1893–1967	American actress, screenwriter and film director	
Michael Currie	Herman Christian Schwenk Jr.	1928–2009	American actor	
Betty Curse	Megan Burns	1986–	English musician and actress	
Alan Curtis	Harry David Ueberroth	1909–1953	American actor	
Chris Curtis	Christopher Crummey	1941–2005	English musician (The Searchers)	
Clem Curtis	Curtis Clements	1940–2017	Trinidadian-British singer (The Foundations)	
King Curtis	Curtis Montgomery	1934–1971	American musician	
Tony Curtis	Bernard Schwartz	1925–2010	American actor	
Michael Curtiz	Manó Kaminer	1886–1962	Hungarian-American film director	Known as Mihály Kertész before anglicizing his name
