= Spanish City (disambiguation) =

Spanish City is a dining and leisure centre in Whitley Bay, England.

Spanish City may also refer to:

- A city in Spain
- Spanish City (novel), by Sarah May, 2002

== See also ==
- Spanish Town (disambiguation)
- List of cities in Spain
