= Matthau Mikojan =

Finnish musician

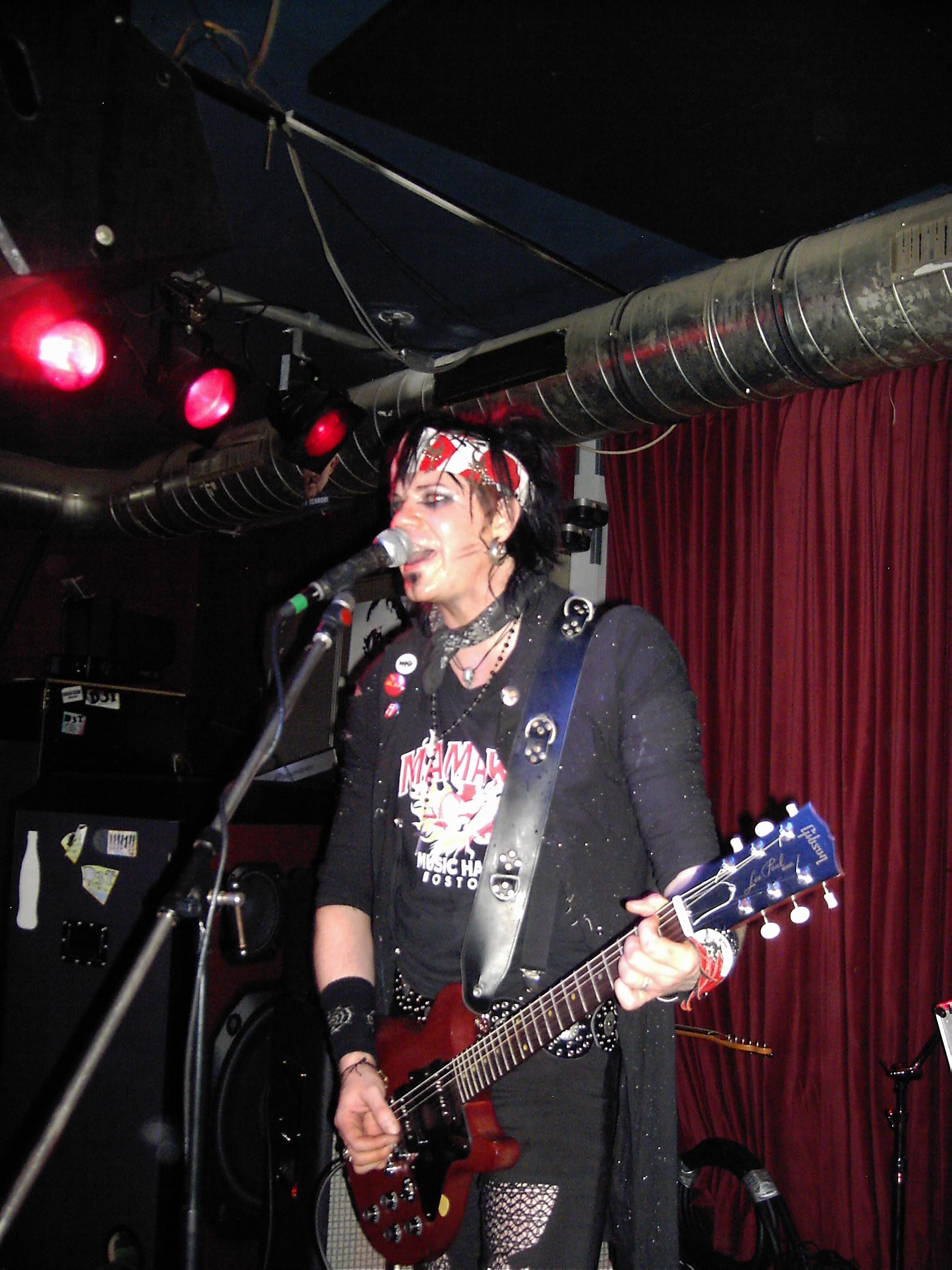
Matthau Mikojan in Stuttgart (October 16, 2008)

Matthau Mikojan (born Matti Mikkonen, March 26, 1982) is a Finnish rock musician, singer, guitarist and songwriter in a band named after him.

== Life ==
Matthau Mikojan was born on March 26, 1982, in Tampere, Finland. His father Tapani "Arwo" Mikkonen was a founding member/guitarist/songwriter in a famous Finnish band Popeda. He died prematurely and unexpected during soundcheck in 1986. He was only 31. About his mother Sirpa there is hardly any information to be found. Mikojan' s older brother Jukka Mikkonen, a.k.a. Sir Christus, was the lead guitarist of Negative. He also died prematurely and unexpected in 2017. He was 39.

== Musical development ==
=== Early beginnings ===
Mikojan befriended Paavo Pekkonen in the summer of 1994. They started a band called RIP followed by Turmio, SBT-666 and Shit Kickers until finally in 1999 they settled with Bloodpit. Mikojan's first gig was not, however, with Bloodpit but with a group called "Ripuli" together with his brother and three other members as early as in 1995.

=== Bloodpit ===
Bloodpit plays its first gig on November 26, 1999. The band goes through several line-up changes, releases several self-produced EPs and participates in band competitions of which, alone in 2001, they win three in a row. The triumphant line-up, including Mikojan's brother whom they dub Kristus, plays festivals and builds a steady following. Bloodpit signs a recording contract in 2004 followed by the release of the debut Mental Circus (2005) and Off The Hook (2007). Within approximately two years Bloodpit releases several singles and an EP, is featured on the EA Game NHL-07 for PlayStation and the FC Venus movie soundtrack, tours and plays shows/festivals in Finland, Italy, Russia, Germany, Netherlands and The United States of America.

Prolonged tensions between the members of Bloodpit result in Mikojan's departure. In 2007 Mikojan embarks on a solo career.

=== Matthau Mikojan ===
Matthau Mikojan starts recording his solo album swiftly after parting ways with Bloodpit. The first single Stiletto Heels sees the daylight on February 6, followed by the self-titled debut on March 12, 2008.

Matthau Mikojan, a three piece band, hits the road touring Finland, Germany and Switzerland. At the end of 2008 the red-hot band enters studio for the follow-up album Mania For Life (2009). At the beginning of 2010 Matthau Mikojan tours Germany with a renewed line-up. The third album "Hell Or High Water" comes out in 2011. In 2012 Matthau Mikojan plays only two shows, one in Helsinki and the other in Halden, Norway. In 2013 Mikojan starts recording his fourth album in solitude. The self-produced album "Her Foreign Language" comes out in 2015 followed by a handful of live performances. Mikojan's big brother Jukka Mikkonen's sudden death in 2017 forces Mikojan to write a song called "Epitaph" which is released on Jukka's birthday April 10, 2019. Mikojan is currently working on new material. A brand new single "Faustian Tango" will be released on Halloween 2020.

== Discography ==
=== With Bloodpit ===
Alben

- Mental Circus (2005)
- Off The Hook (2007)

Singles

- Out to Find You (2005)
- One More Time (2005)
- Platitude (2005)
- Bad-Ass Blues (2005)
- Wise Men Don't Cry (2007)

EPs

- Promo EP (2000)
- No 2 (2001)
- You Name It (2003)
- Platitude (2004)
- Sauna Päälle! (2006)

Music videos

- Platitude (2005)
- Bad-Ass Blues (2006)
- Wise Men Don't Cry (2007)

DVDs

- Live@Nosturi (2007)

=== Under the name Matthau Mikojan ===
Alben

- Matthau Mikojan (2008)
- Mania For Life (2009)
- Hell Or High Water (2011)
- Her Foreign Language (2015)

Singles

- Stiletto Heels (2008)
- Too Fortunate To Cry (2008)
- Gypsy Eye (2009)
- Plastic Trays (2010)
- You (2015)
- Epitaph (2019)
- Faustian Tango (2020)

EPs

- Chasing Ghosts (2008)

Music videos

- Too Fortunate To Cry (2008)
- Chasing Ghosts (2008)
- Another Snake In Paradise (2015)
- Presence (2016)
