= Uniklubi =

Finnish alternative rock band

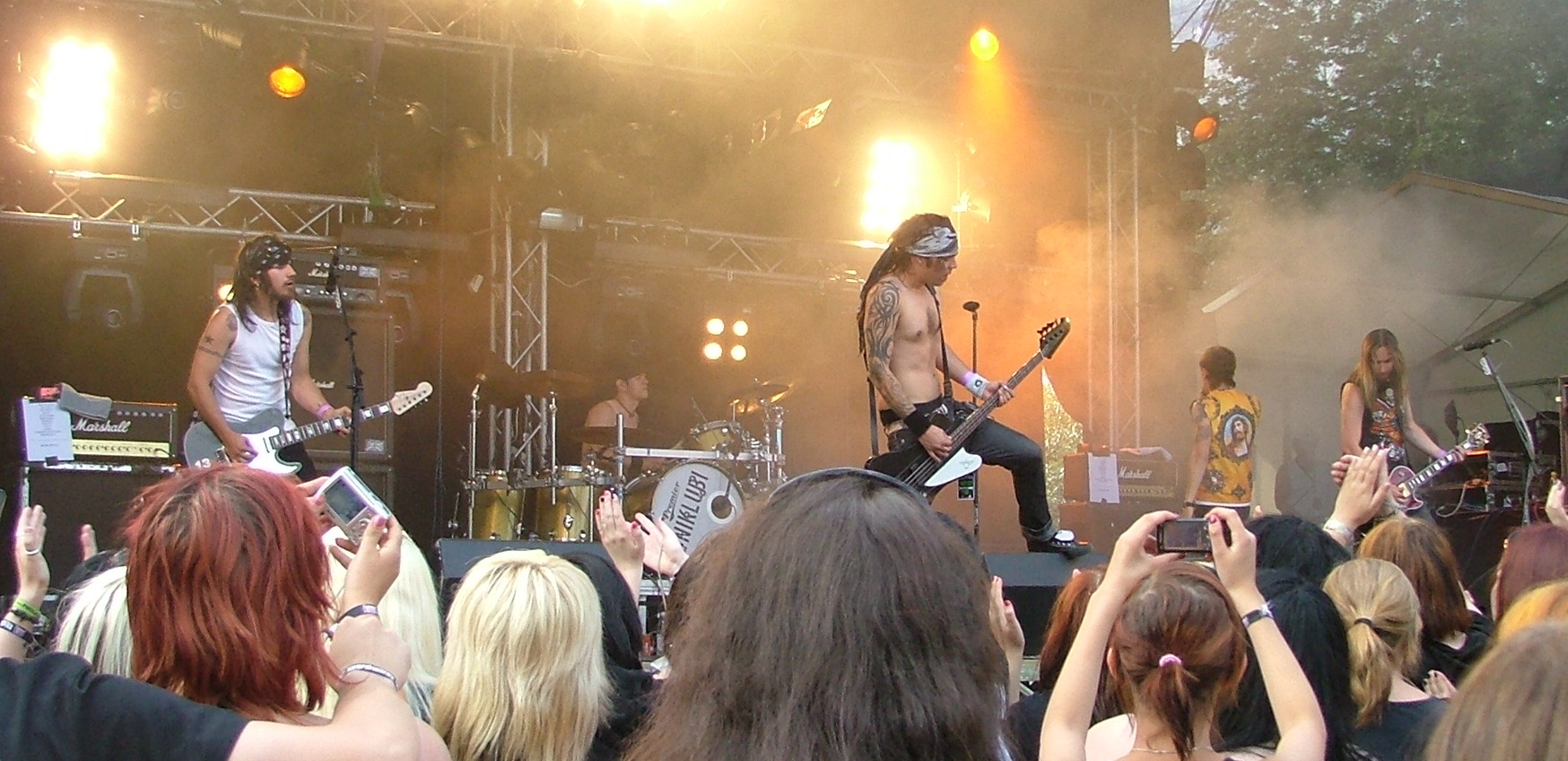
- Uniklubi performing at Rockcock, 2008

Background information
- Origin: Finland
- Genres: Alternative rock, hard rock
- Years active: 1999–present
- Members: Jussi Selo; Janne Selo; Pasi Viitala; Teemu Mäntykorpi; Jani Auvinen; Tuomas Lepistö
- Past members: Antti Matikainen; Teemu Rajamäki; Janne Jokiniemi
- Website: www.uniklubi.net

Uniklubi is a Finnish alternative rock band. It was founded in 1999. The band became well known for its hit "Rakkautta ja piikkilankaa" in 2004. The band's lyrics are in the Finnish language. All members are from the town of Hämeenkyrö, except the bassist Teemu Rajamäki, who is from Ikaalinen. Originally they called themselves 'Pincenez' but they did not get much positive feedback about it, so they renamed their band 'Uniklubi', a Finnish word that means 'Dream Club'.

== History ==
The band was founded in 1999 by Jussi and Pasi. The name "Uniklubi" did not exist at the time; they went by the name Pincenez (a French term for a type of glasses without earpieces). The first songs they played were covers of their favorite bands, in English. However, as they began writing their own songs, Jussi felt more confident with his mother tongue, Finnish. They eventually changed the name to Uniklubi ("dream club"), which had no real significance for them.

By playing their first gigs, they earned some money they used to go into studio and record their first demo-tapes.

While recording the first album "Rakkautta Ja Piikkilankaa" (Love and Barbed-Wire) the drummer left the band. Antti Matikainen replaced him and has been part of Uniklubi ever since.

The first single was "Rakkautta Ja Piikkilankaa". It was voted by YleX as the most popular song of the year. The album got into the charts (Top 4) and Uniklubi got their first important award: They won an Emma Award (Newcomer of the year). "Rakkautta Ja Piikkilankaa" reached platinum in Finland (They sold more than 30,000 copies of the album). Other releases of "Rakkautta Ja Piikkilankaa": Kylmää, Näiden Tähtien Alla and Totuus.

The second album, "Kehä" (Circle) was released on November 2 and the album entered the charts at number one. It stayed in the charts for more than 20 weeks in the Top20 and even the first release of the album "Kaikki Mitä Mä Annoin" (All that I gave) entered the charts at number one. The second release was "Kiertää Kehää" and entered the charts at number ten.

During summer 2006, the singer was diagnosed with a bump on his vocal cords, after losing his voice repeatedly during concerts. The band had to cancel a tour in Germany, which would have been their first outside Northern Europe, for Jussi to undergo throat surgery. Everything went fine, and the few gigs performed during the Christmas holidays were marked by a beautiful, new clear voice.

The band entered studios again at the beginning of 2007, and have already released their first single, "Vnus", in May, along with the track "Aurinkoni" (My Sun) as a b-side. The new album, titled "Luotisade" (Bullet Rain) was released in August 2007.

On March 4, 2009, the band released a new album titled "Syvään valoon." The first single from the album was "Polje". They later released "Kukka" as the new single.

During the summer 2010 Uniklubi had several gigs added with the unique group of musicians. They had one pianist, two violinists, altoviolinist and cellist.

On September 22, Uniklubi released their fifth studio album titled "Kultakalat" (Goldfishes). On 31 September the band started their album release tour which will lasted until the late summer of 2011.

In 2026, Uniklubi released the album Encore, which had been in production for approximately three years. The album was preceded by the single "Kävelen pois", which was written by Jussi Selo in collaboration with Niko Moilanen and Aleksi Kaunisvesi, both known for their work with Blind Channel. Encore was released on 4 September 2026 on CD and digitally through Playground Music.

== Related bands ==
Like many other Finnish bands, Uniklubi can easily be linked to other groups, whether by friendships or collaborations. Jussi Selo, singer for Uniklubi, has previously sung for Lovex, as well as guest backing vocals on some of Negative's tracks. More recently, he participated with backing vocals to the cover of Queen's "Too Much Love Will Kill You", interpreted by Negative's Jonne Aaron, Sir Christus and Larry Love, Jann Wilde and Rose Avenue's Jann Wilde and Dead By Gun's Christian. Ville Liimatainen, younger brother of Jonne, also contributed to the backing vocals. In Bloodpit's 2007 video "Wise Men Don't Cry", Jussi played a vengeful brother, alongside Antti Anatomy of Negative. He has also sung backing vocals on several songs for Finnish rock band, Sisu. Janne Selo previously sang for the band Bitch So Sweet, a quartet he left as Uniklubi took more of his time. He also replaced Entwine's guitarist for 5 concerts in their spring tour in Germany.

== Band members ==
- Jussi Selo (born January 21, 1985, in Tampere, Finland) – vocals
- Janne Samuli Selo (born April 16, 1980) – guitars
- Pasi Viitala (born March 6, 1983) – electronic guitar
- Teemu Mäntykorpi - bass guitar
- Jani Auvinen - drums
- Tuomas Lepistö - keyboard

== Former members ==
- Antti Matikainen – drums
- Janne Jokiniemi - drums
- Teemu Rajamäki – bass guitar

Teemu Rajamäki left the band on March 19, 2012. This was announced on the band's homepage.

== Discography ==
=== Albums ===
- Rakkautta ja piikkilankaa (2004)
- Kehä (2005)
- Luotisade (2007)
- Syvään Valoon (2009)
- Kultakalat (2010)
- Tulennielijä (2018)
- Ajan piirtämät kasvot (2020)
- 8 (2023)
- Encore (2026)

=== Singles ===
- Rakkautta ja piikkilankaa (2004) (Love and Barbed Wire)
- Kylmää (2004) (Cold)
- Olemme Yhtä (2004) (We Are One)
- Totuus (2004) (The Truth)
- Näiden tähtien alla (2004) (Underneath These Stars)
- Kaikki mitä mä annoin (2005) (All That I Gave)
- Huomenna (Promotional Single) (2005) (Tomorrow)
- Kiertää Kehää (2006) (Rounding Circle)
- Tuhka (Promotional Single) (2006) (Ash)
- Vnus (2007) (Venus)
- Luotisade (Promotional Single) (2007) (Bulletrain)
- Polje (2009) (Box)
- Kukka (2009) (Flower)
- Aikasi On Nyt (2010) (Your Time Is Now)
- Sydän janoaa (2014) (My Heart Is Thirsty)
- Laavaa (2017) (Lava)
- Pakkopaita (2017) (Straitjacket)
- Tulennielijä (2018) (Fire Eater)
- Huojuva silta (2019) (Shaky Bridge)
- Bailaten koko elämä (2019) (Dancing All My Life)
- Siipirikko (2020) (Bird With a Broken Wing)
- Hetken olen vapaa (2021) (I Am Free For a While)
- Jos tähän jään (2021) (If I Stay Here)
- Hehkuvia kipinöitä (2022) (Glowing Sparks)
- Sammuttamaton (2022) (Unextinguishable)
- Rakkautta ja piikkilankaa (Juhlaversio) (2024)
- La La Shangri-La (2024)
- Ohimenevää (2025)
- Unohda mut (2025)
- Voittaja (2026)
- Kävelen pois (2026)

== Music videos ==
- Rakkautta ja piikkilankaa (2004)
- Kaikki mitä mä annoin (2005)
- Huomenna (2005)
- Vnus (2007)
- Luotisade (2007)
- Rakkaudesta hulluuteen (2008)
- Polje (2009)
- Kukka (2009)
- Mitä vittua? (2009)
- Aikasi on nyt (2010)
- Maailma Puhaltaa (2010)
- Pakkopaita (2017)
- Bailaten koko elämä (2019)
- Siipirikko (2020)
- Jos tähän jään (2021)
- Sammuttamaton (2022)
- Sabotaasi (2023)
- Unohda mut (2025)
