= Trendkill =

Trendkill may refer to:

- Six Songs of Hellcity Trendkill, 2002 album by Private Line
- The Great Southern Trendkill, 1996 album by Pantera
