= Bloodpit =

Finnish hard rock band

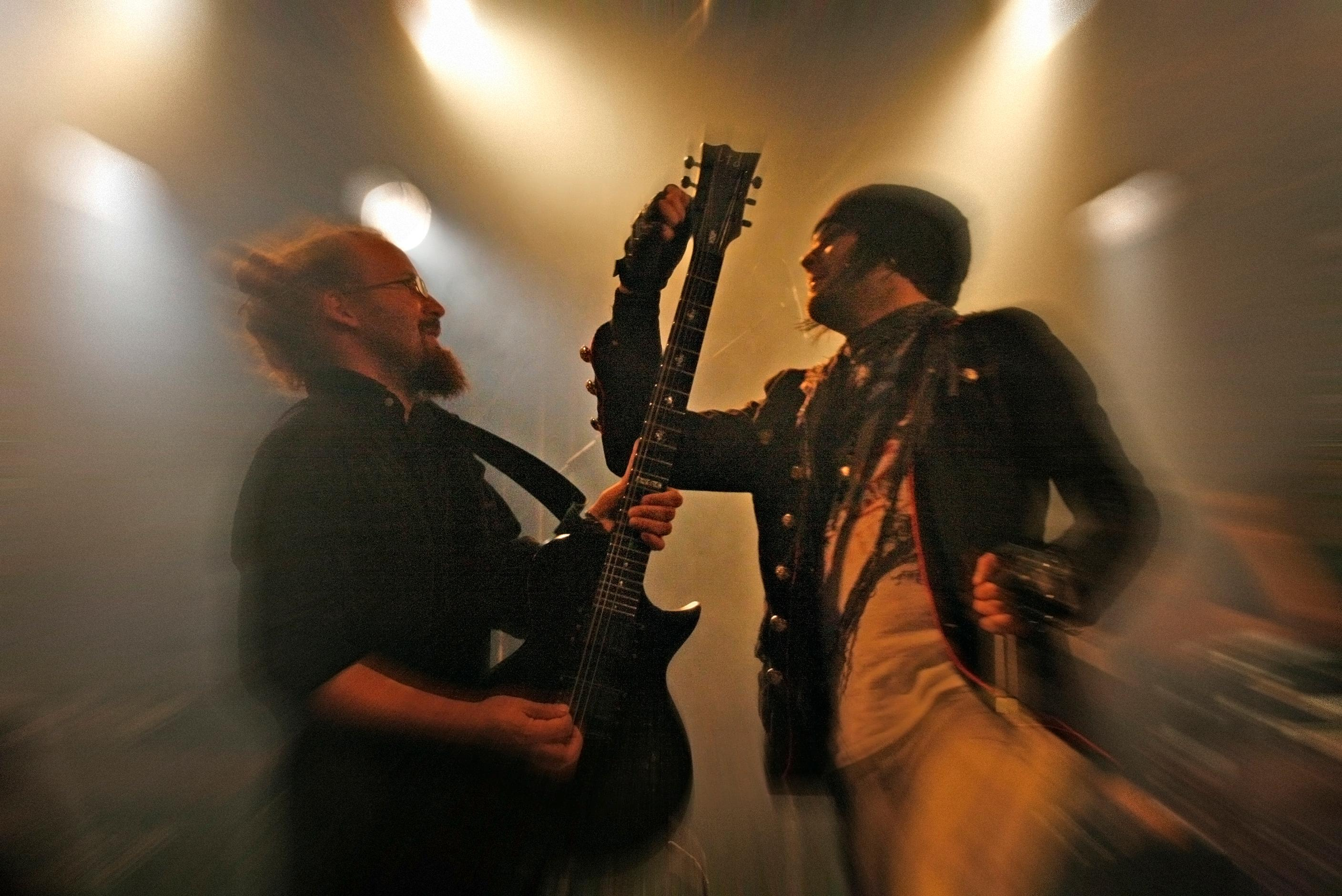
- Bloodpit in 2009

Background information
- Origin: Finland
- Genres: Hard rock
- Years active: 1994–present
- Members: Antti Ravín; Paavo Pekkonen; Pietu Hiltunen; Aleksi Keränen; Alarik Valamo
- Website: http://bloodpitband.com

Bloodpit is a Finnish hard rock band. Before 1998, the band has been named "RIP" and "Turmio". It was founded in 1994 by Matthau Mikojan (Matti Mikkonen), lead singer, and Paavo Pekkonen, guitarist. They released their first album Mental Circus in 2005, along with many singles, such as "Platitude", "Bad-Ass Blues", and "Wise Men Don't Cry". Their second album, Off the Hook, was released in 2007. The single "Platitude" is on the soundtrack to the EA Sports game NHL 07.

== Band members ==
- Antti Ravín – vocals
- Paavo Pekkonen – guitar
- Pietu Hiltunen – guitar
- Aleksi Keränen – bass
- Alarik Valamo – drums

=== Previous band members ===
- Matthau Mikojan – guitar and vocals (1998–2007)
- Janne Kolehmainen – bass (1998–2000)
- Arnold T. Kumputie – drums (1999–2002)
- Sir Christus – guitar and backing vocals (2000–2002)
- Paspartou Hagen – bass (2002)

== Related bands ==
Previously bassist for Bloodpit, Matthau's older brother, Sir Christus, left to play guitar in Negative. Of the latter, Antti Anatomy, bassist, appeared in Bloodpit's video "Wise Men Don't Cry" as a vengeful brother, accompanied by Jussi Selo, from Uniklubi, in a similar role. Also, Matthau and his brother are sons of departed Arwo Mikkonen, who has played guitar for the famous band Popeda.

== Discography ==
=== Albums ===
- Mental Circus (2005)
- Off the Hook (2007)
- The Last Day Before the First (2009)

=== EPs ===
- Sauna Päälle! (2006)
- Recovered (2008)

=== Singles ===
- "Out to Find You" (2005)
- "One More Time" (2005)
- "Platitude" (2005)
- "Bad-Ass Blues" (2005)
- "Wise Men Don't Cry" (2007)

=== Videos ===
- "Platitude" (2005)
- "Bad-Ass Blues" (2006)
- "Wise Men Don't Cry" (2007)
- "For You to Be Safe" (2008)
