= Spanish Town (disambiguation) =

Spanish Town (Spanish: Ciudad Española) may refer to one of the following:

- Yankee Hill, formerly known as Spanishtown
- Half Moon Bay, formerly known as Spanishtown
- Spanish Town, the former Spanish and English capital of Jamaica
- Spanish Town, Baton Rouge, Louisiana, United States
- Spanish Town, British Virgin Islands, the main settlement on Virgin Gorda island
- Spanish Town, U.S. Virgin Islands

== See also ==
- Spanish City
- List of towns in Spain
