= Robert Burns Dick =

British architect and city planner

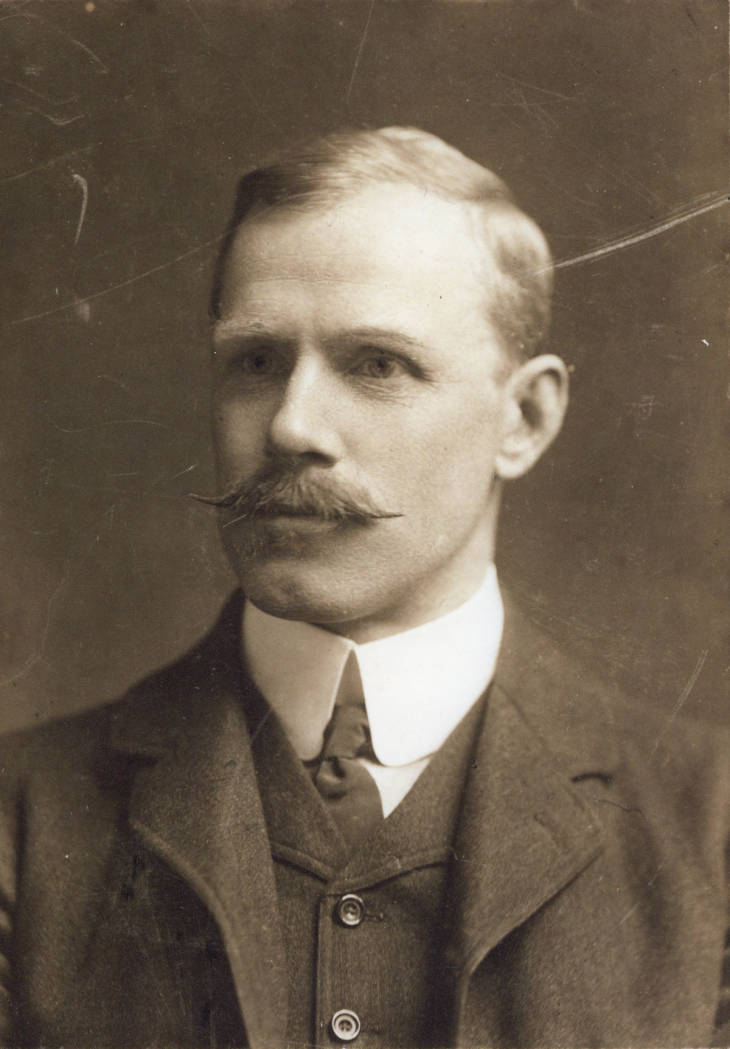
- Formal portrait of Robert Burns Dick taken between 1890–1900
- Born: 1868; Stirling
- Died: 1954 (aged 85–86); Esher, Surrey
- Education: Royal Grammar School
- Occupation: Architect

Robert Burns Dick (1868–1954) was a British architect, city planner and artist. Mainly working in the Newcastle upon Tyne area, he designed municipal buildings, churches and over one hundred houses and housing schemes in the North East of England.

== Early life ==
Burns Dick was born in Stirling but moved to Newcastle as a child where his father worked in the brewing trade. He was educated in the Royal Grammar School and went on to go to Art School. He went on to be articled to William Lister Newcombe.

== Career ==
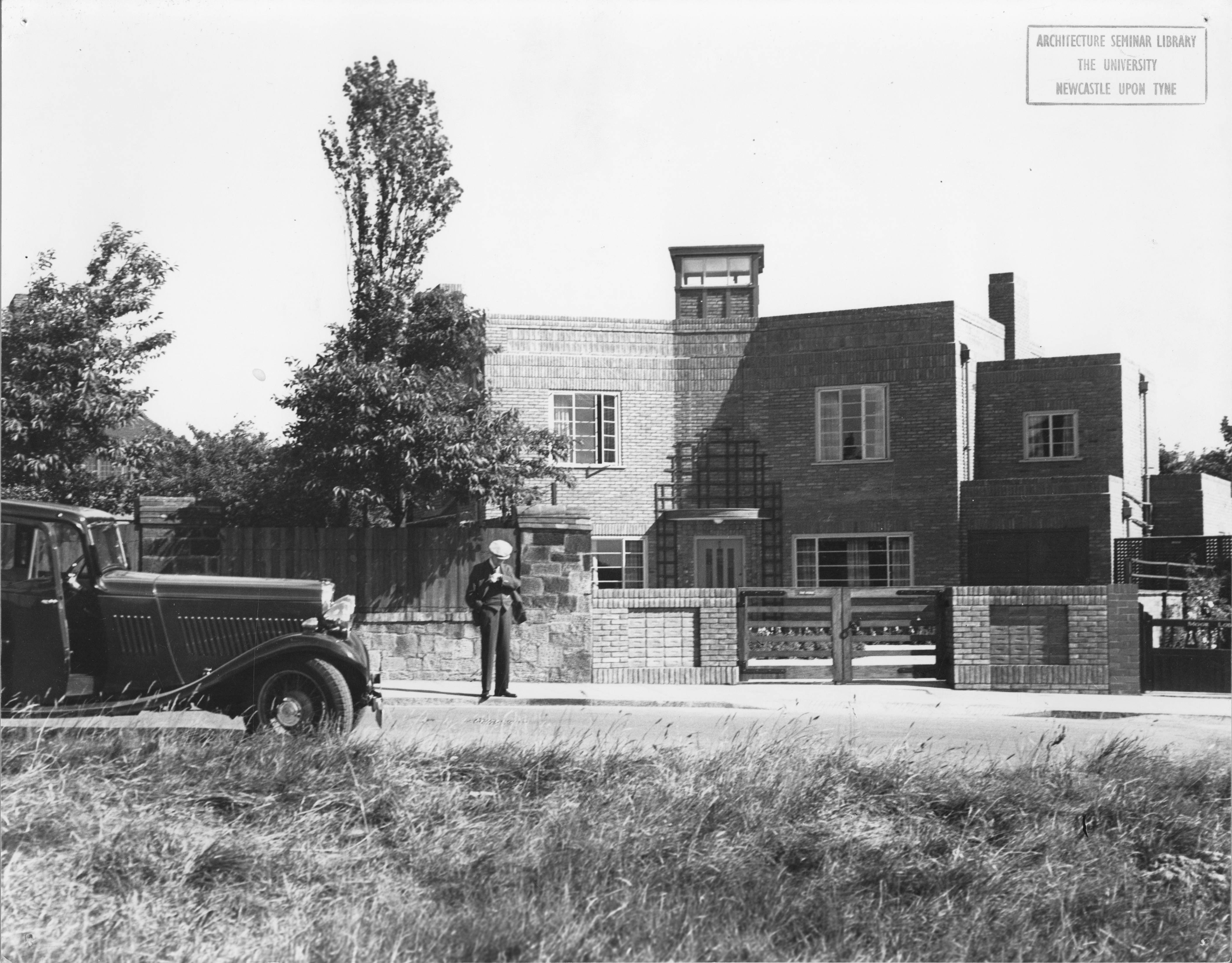
Burns Dick standing outside of The Wedge, built 1934

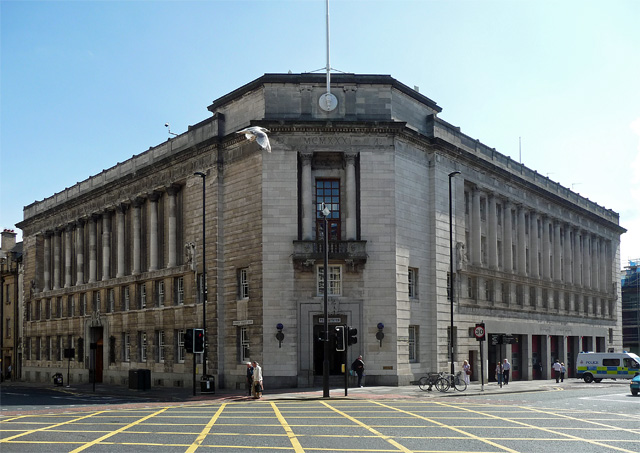
Pilgrim Street Central Police and Fire Station

In 1888 he became an assistant in the office of Armstrong & Knowles of Newcastle Upon Tyne, remaining there until 1893 when he set up his own firm. In 1895, Burns Dick formed a partnership with Charles Thomas Marshall, born 1866, who had been an apprentice in Newcombe's office alongside Dick and set-up an independent practice in Newcastle in 1892. The next year they won the competition for the design of the Corporation Lodging House in Aberdeen.

Their partnership ended in 1897, with Marshall moving office in 1899 to London and Burns Dick was taken into partnership by the older James Thorburn Cackett, the practice name becoming Cackett & Burns Dick. Generally, Cackett worked on the business side, and Burns Dick provided the artistic input. Cackett retired in 1920, and by 1923 Robert MacKellar, born 1880, was taken into partnership. The practice was renamed Burns Dick & MacKellar at the time of Cackett's death in 1928 and still trades today under MacKellar Schwerdt Partnership.

The first important building he was solely responsible for designing was the Berwick police station in 1901. He designed other important buildings before World War I including the Spanish City in Whitley Bay, Cross House and Laing Art Gallery. Burns Dick became a fellow of the Royal Institute of British Architects on 8 January 1906, and in 1914–18 was the President of the Northern Architectural Association, and during this time he wrote a number of articles on the effects of war on architecture.

During the Great War, Burns Dick and Cackett designed the Armstrong Naval Yard and worked for the Short Brothers at the Royal Airship Works in Cardington, Bedfordshire which included the building of the village of Shortstown to house the workers. Also, he served as a captain in the Royal Garrison Artillery.

After the war, he got involved in municipal housing and was influenced by the Garden city movement and designed the Pendower council housing estate based on the layout of an English village with the density of twelve to eighteen houses per acre rather than the usual twenty. In 1924 he was a founding member of the Newcastle Upon Tyne Society to Improve the Beauty, Health and Amenities of the City which aimed to regenerate the city centre and give Newcastle a green belt. Later he became chair of the Newcastle Town Planning Committee. He designed the granite towers on the Tyne Bridge, originally planning for a grand arched entrance to the city which was never built. He later went on to design the Grade II listed buildings of Newcastle University Students' Union, in 1924, and Central Police Station, Magistrates Court and Fire Station, in 1934, which won national acclaim. At the time the Evening Chronicle said: "Could Mr Burns Dick have the opportunity of replanning Newcastle as he planned this building, the city might become a modern Athens or Rome."

== Death and legacy ==
Burns Dick retired to Esher, Surrey in 1940 and died in 1954. He is buried in Elswick cemetery.

In 2026, a blue plaque was unveiled commemorating Burns Dick at the Pendower Estate, which he designed, in Newcastle's west end. The plaque was unveiled by the Lord Mayor of Newcastle, Cllr Henry Gallagher, who said: "He's been described as the unknown architect but the buildings he designed are far from unknown. They are as much a part of our region today as they were when he first designed them. That is testimony to his greatness as an architect".
