= Evel Knievel Factor =

Studio album by Private Line
- Released: November 1, 2006
- Recorded: 2006
- Genre: Rock
- Length: 40:29
- Label: Bad Habits Records, Playground Scandinavia, JVC Japan
- Producer: Sammy Aaltonen & Private Line

Private Line chronology
21st Century Pirates (2004)	Evel Knievel Factor (2006)

Professional ratings
Review scores
Source	Rating
Desibeli.net	4/5 stars
Findance.com	8/10 stars
Rokkizine	3/5 stars
mesta.net	3/5 stars
Imperiumi.net	8/10 stars
Soundi.fi	3/5
Vertigo.cd	4/5 stars
Whiplash.net	9/10 stars
Melodic.net	3.5/5 stars

Evel Knievel Factor is the second studio-album by the Finnish rock group Private Line. It was released in Finland on 1 November 2006. Two singles have been released from the album: "Broken Promised Land" on 31 May 2005, and "Sound Advice" on 28 January 2007. The b-side on the "Broken Promised Land" single is the album track "Uniform", while as b-sides to "Sound Advice" are two previously unreleased songs, "Tokyo" and "Criminal". The title is a reference to legendary American motorcycle daredevil Evel Knievel.

== Track listing ==
1. "(Prelude) For The Daredevils" (1:08)
2. "Evel Knievel Factor" (3:34)
3. "Broken Promised Land" (4:02)
4. "Alive" (3:50)
5. "Sound Advice" (3:42)
6. "The SINdicate" (3:46)
7. "Prozac Nation" (2:58)
8. "Uniform" (3:37)
9. "Gods Of Rewind" (4:08)
10. "Anyway" (4:18)
11. "Billion Star Hotel" (5:05)
12. "Tokyo" (3:53) (* bonus track for the Japan release)
13. "He's A Whore" (Rick Nielsen) (* bonus track for the Japan release. Originally recorded by Cheap Trick).

== Singles ==
Singles released from the Evel Knievel Factor album as follows:

- Broken Promised Land (31 May 2006)
1. "Broken Promised Land" (4:02)
2. "Uniform" (3:37)
- Sound Advice (31 January 2007)
1. "Sound Advice" (3:42)
2. "Tokyo" (*previously unreleased)
3. "Criminal (Manchuria, Claude)" (*previously unreleased. Originally recorded by Smack)
