= Spanish City =

Amusement park in Whitley Bay, Tyne & Wear, England

The Spanish City
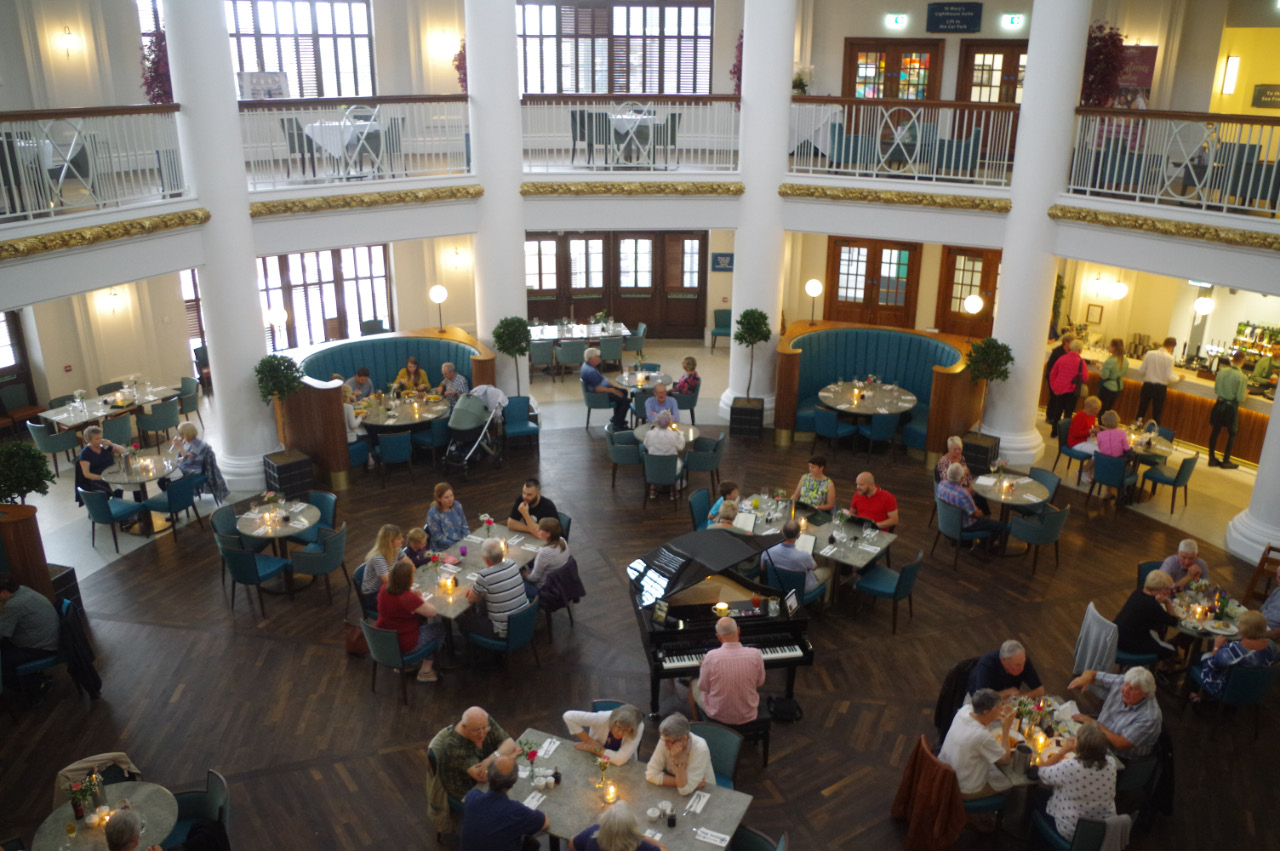
- Inside the Spanish City
- Interactive map of the The Spanish City area
- Alternative names: Whitley Bay Pleasure Gardens

General information
- Status: Grade II listed building (the dome)
- Location: Watts Road, Whitley Bay, Tyne and Wear, England
- Coordinates: 55°02′51″N 1°26′51″W
- Opened: 14 May 1910
- Renovated: 2011–2018
- Renovation cost: £10m
- Client: Whitley Bay Pleasure Gardens Ltd
- Owner: North Tyneside Council (June 2011)

Dimensions
- Diameter: 180 ft long, 275 ft deep

Design and construction
- Architecture firm: Cackett and Burns Dick
- Structural engineer: L.G. Mouchel
- Main contractor: Davidson and Miller

Renovating team
- Architect: ADP
- Renovating firm: Robertson Group

Website
- Spanish City

The Spanish City is a dining and leisure centre in Whitley Bay, a seaside town in North Tyneside, Tyne & Wear, England. Erected as a smaller version of Blackpool's Pleasure Beach, it opened in 1910 as a concert hall, restaurant, roof garden and tearoom. A ballroom was added in 1920 and later a permanent funfair.

Located near the seafront, the Spanish City has a 180 ft-long (54.8 m) Renaissance-style frontage and became known for its distinctive dome, now a Grade II listed building. There are towers on either side of the entrance, each of which carries a half-life-size female bacchanalian figure in copper, one holding cymbals, the other a tambourine. The building's architects were Robert Burns Dick, Charles T. Marshall and James Cackett.

The band Dire Straits mentioned the Spanish City in their 1980 single, "Tunnel of Love", which from then on was played every morning when it opened. By the late 1990s the building had fallen into disrepair, and in the early 2000s it was closed to the public. A regeneration project was announced in 2011. The building reopened as a dining and leisure centre at the end of July 2018.

== Architecture ==
The Spanish City faces the sea, with a 180 ft-long front and a depth of 275 ft. The dome rises to 75 ft above the foundation and has a diameter of 50 ft, supported on 46-ft-high concrete columns. It is made of a reinforced-concrete shell, five inches thick, which is supported by 12 (10 in x 18 in) internal ribs.

The architects were Robert Burns Dick, Charles T. Marshall, and James Cackett of Cackett and Burns Dick. J. Coulson was a design consultant and L. G. Mouchel were structural consultants. Davidson and Miller were the contractors.

== History ==
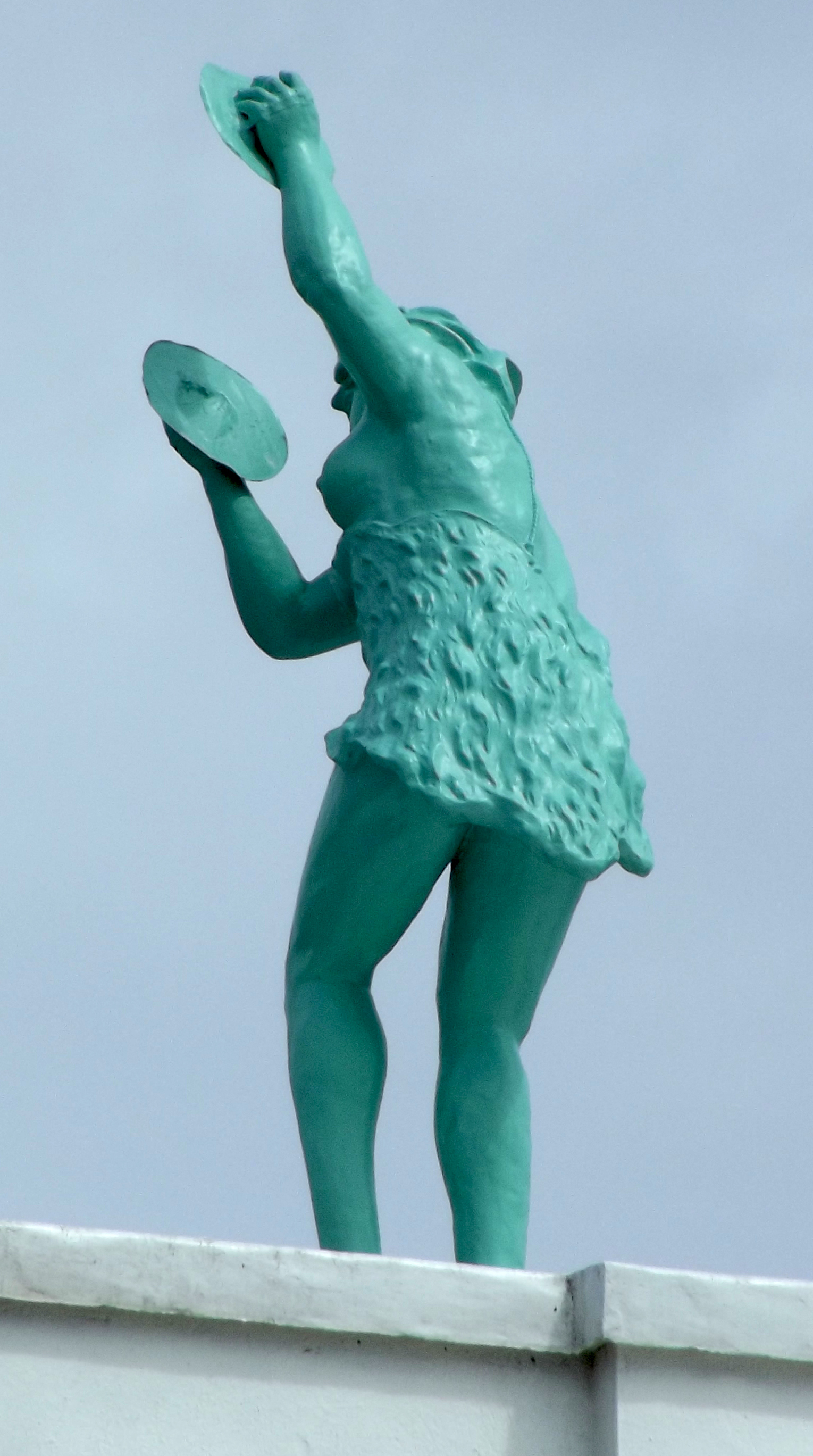
One of the building's two female figures in copper

Charles Elderton of the Hebburn Theatre Royal originally established an amusements arcade and dance hall on the site. His Toreadors Concert Party had entertained visitors with an open-air theatre in Whitley Park every summer since 1907, with the awnings decorated in the Spanish style. To provide a permanent fixture, he founded Whitley Amusements Ltd.

The dome was erected in 1910. The building was formally opened by Robert Mason, chair of the local council, on the evening of Saturday, 14 May 1910, as The Spanish City and Whitley Bay Pleasure Gardens. There were shops and cafes inside, a roof garden, and the Empress Theatre, with seating for 1,400 on the floor and 400 on the balcony. The theatre was converted to the Empress Ballroom in 1920, and a first floor was inserted into the dome, which became known as the Rotunda. In 1979 the Rotunda was converted into the Starlight Rooms for live entertainment.

The dome was used as a classroom for pupils of Whitley Bay High School during a caretakers' strike in the 1980s, and later became a live music venue, playing host to several bands, including Ash in 2001.

External videos
- "Spanish City, 1967", filmed by Frank and Norah Wardle

Dire Straits songwriter Mark Knopfler and the musician Sting talked about their memories of the Spanish City. Knopfler, who was born in Glasgow but grew up in Blyth, Northumberland, a few miles from the Spanish City, said it was the first place he had ever heard really loud rock and roll. Sting, born near Newcastle, spent his afternoons and evenings in the Spanish City when he should have been studying for his A levels.

On Sunday, 27 July 2014, Newcastle-based performer Chris Cross became the last person to perform in the original Spanish City dome, before developers entered the building on 28 July 2014. Cross performed magic stunts with support from Doctor Diablo. There was a fire show outside on the piazza by a local performer, Charlie Burns.

== Whitley Bay Pleasure Gardens ==
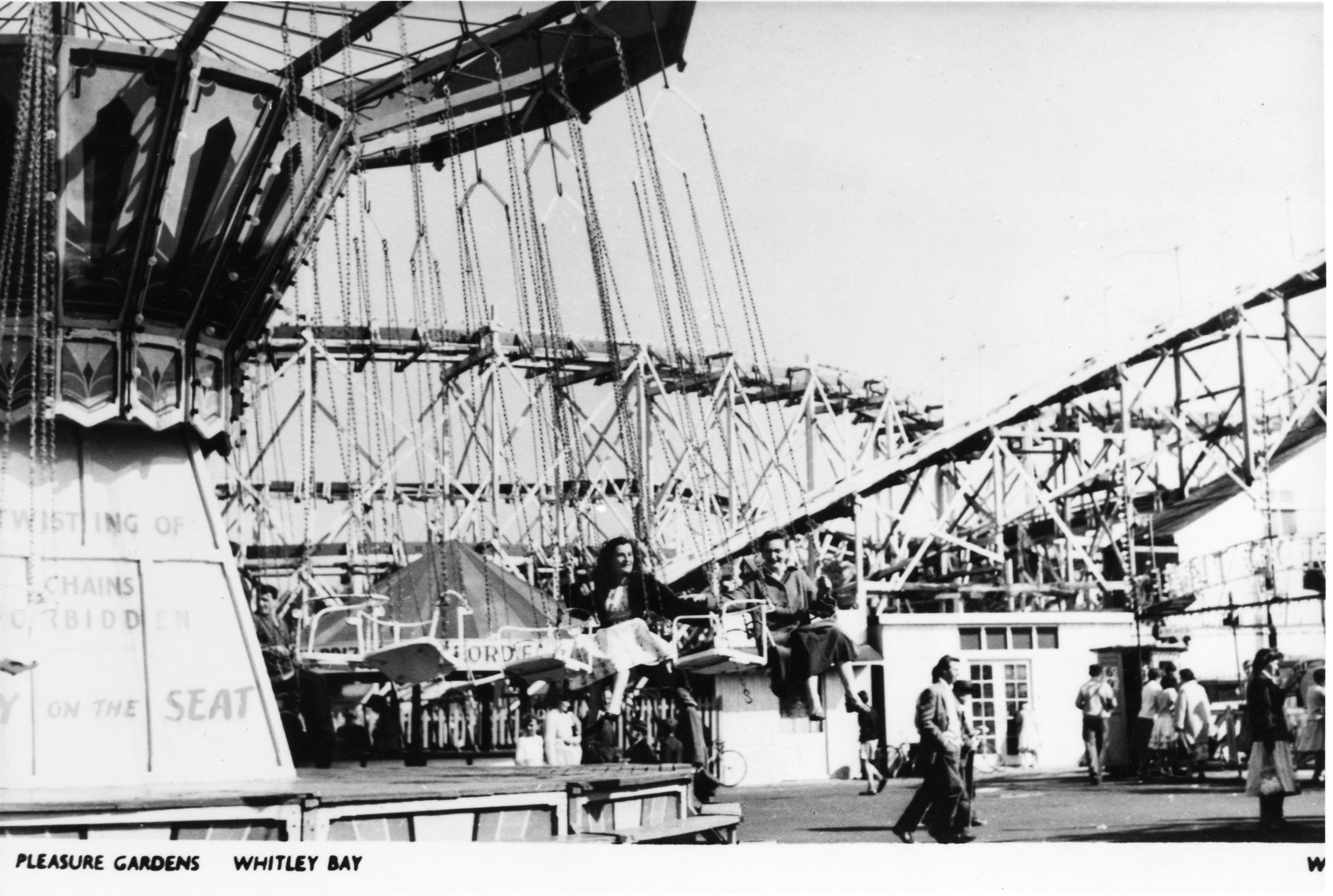
Pleasure Gardens funfair, 1960s or 70s

In 1909 the Whitley Pleasure Gardens Company Ltd. was formed and built up a large fairground. The funfair was extremely popular, with fairground rides and amusements, including a "corkscrew" roller coaster—which was at Flamingoland in Yorkshire from 1983 to 2011, then at Luna Park in France—ghost train and waltzers, the House that Jack Built, the Joy Wheel, the Social Whirl, the Great Aerial Flight, the Virginia Reel, Hall of Laughter and the Fun House. A river cave ride named Ye Olde Mill featured floating boats which travelled through a tunnel with scenery such as a Swiss valley, an Indian jungle and a fairy castle. From 1909 to 1974 a figure 8 railway could be found at the fair ground. Throughout the 1960s there was also a Miniature Cartridge Rifle range using Winchester pump action rifles chambered in .22 short calibre. In June 1914 a new ride, named the Rainbow Pleasure Wheel joined the fair. It was imported from the United States reaching top speeds of around 40 mph.

The Spanish City Dome housed an amusement arcade and later a Laser Quest Laser Tag arena.

By the mid-1990s the Pleasure Gardens had fallen into disrepair and was closed in 1998. In December 1998 the demolition of the fairground was announced.

Tunnel of Love

And now I'm searching through
these carousels and carnival arcades
Searching everywhere
from Steeplechase to Palisades
And any shooting gallery
where promises are made
To Rockaway, Rockaway
Rockaway, Rockaway
From Cullercoats and Whitley Bay
Out to Rockaway.
And girl it looks so pretty to me
Like it always did
Like the Spanish City to me
When we were kids.

— Dire Straits, 1980

== Regeneration ==
In June 2011, architecture firm ADP won a commission to regenerate the Spanish City with a plan that included a 50-bed, four-star boutique hotel, 20 apartments, a 1950s diner and a pleasure garden. The completion date was announced as 2014, but work was halted in 2013 because of a lack of funds. The project received a grant of £3.7m from the Heritage Lottery Fund in November 2013. The building reopened in July 2018.

In August 2025, Corrie Lee Stavers, 28, a fairground worker, died in a workplace accident at the funfair.

== In popular culture ==
Dire Straits refer to the Spanish City in their 1980 song "Tunnel of Love", which became the fairground's unofficial theme song, played every morning when it opened. The town mentioned in the song, Cullercoats, is a stop on the train line (now part of the Tyne and Wear Metro) along the coast from Whitley Bay.

Other pop-culture references include Spanish City (2002), a novel by Sarah May, set in the fictional north-east town of Setton, home to an amusement park called the Spanish City. The Spanish City also features in the video that accompanied Tina Cousins' song "Pray" (1998).

In the British TV series Vera, the Spanish City appears several times in the episode "Protected" (Season 4, Episode 2, 2014). In particular, Vera mentions the Spanish City to Joe regarding a memory from her childhood at the end of the episode.

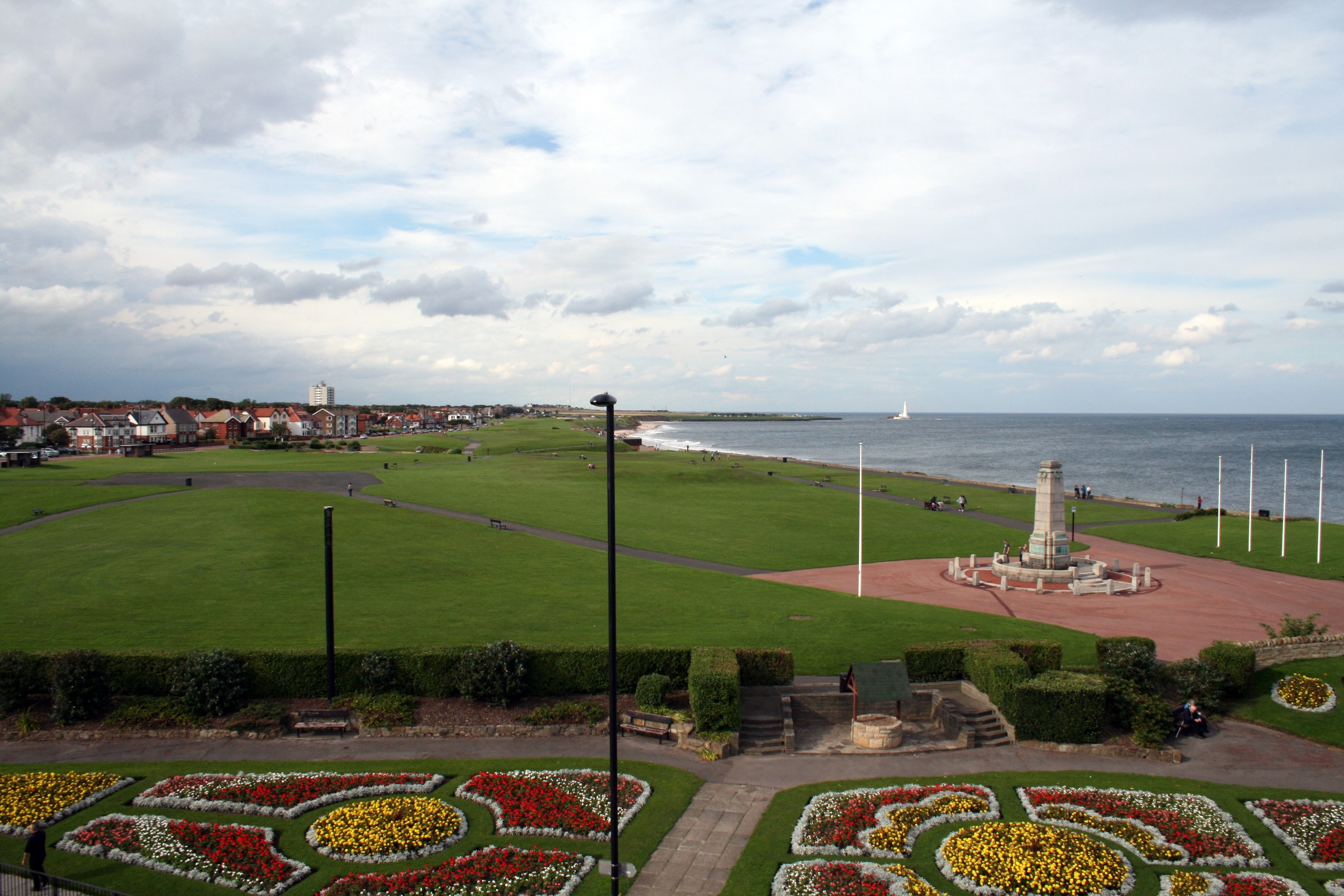
View from the dome, September 2011

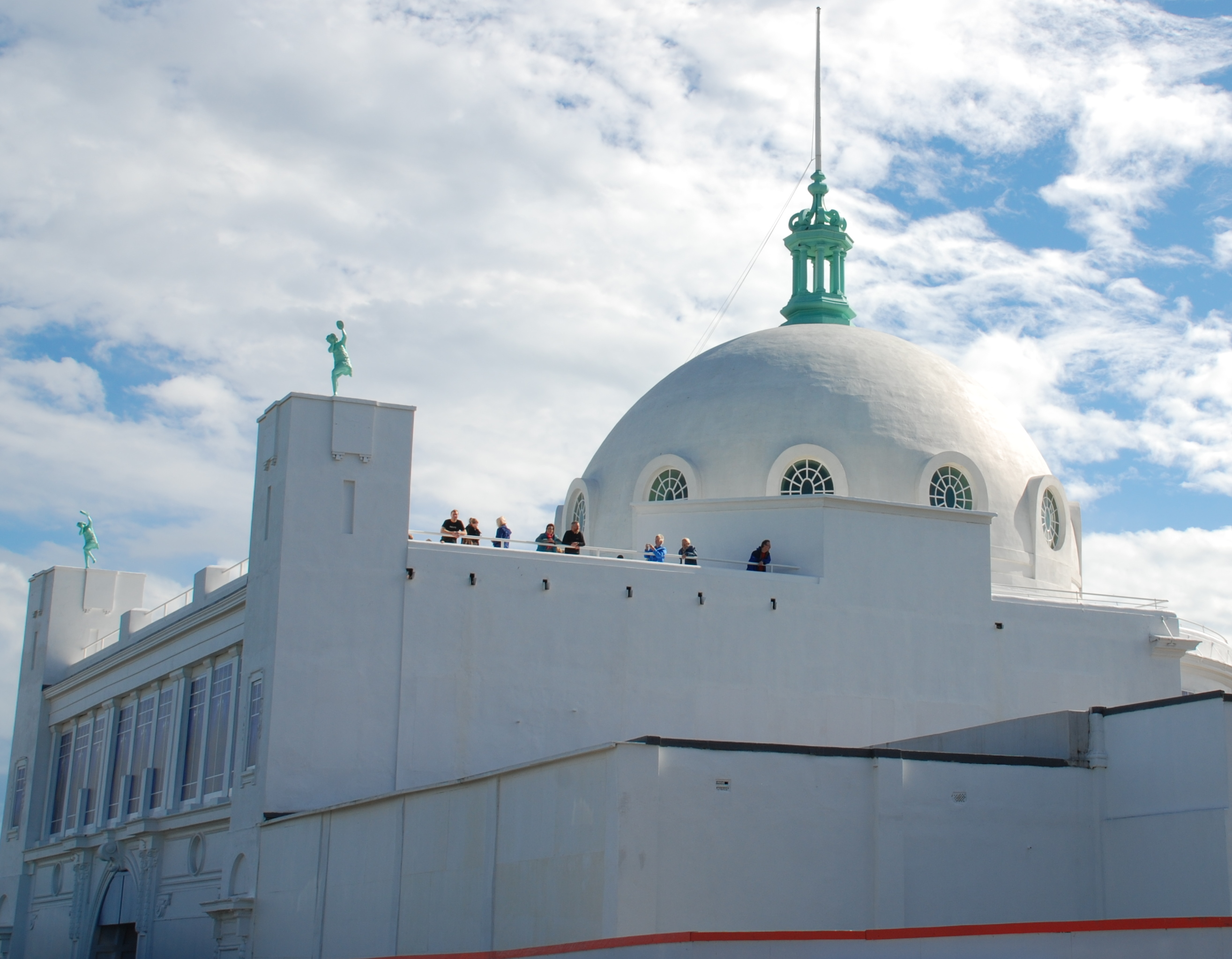
September 2010

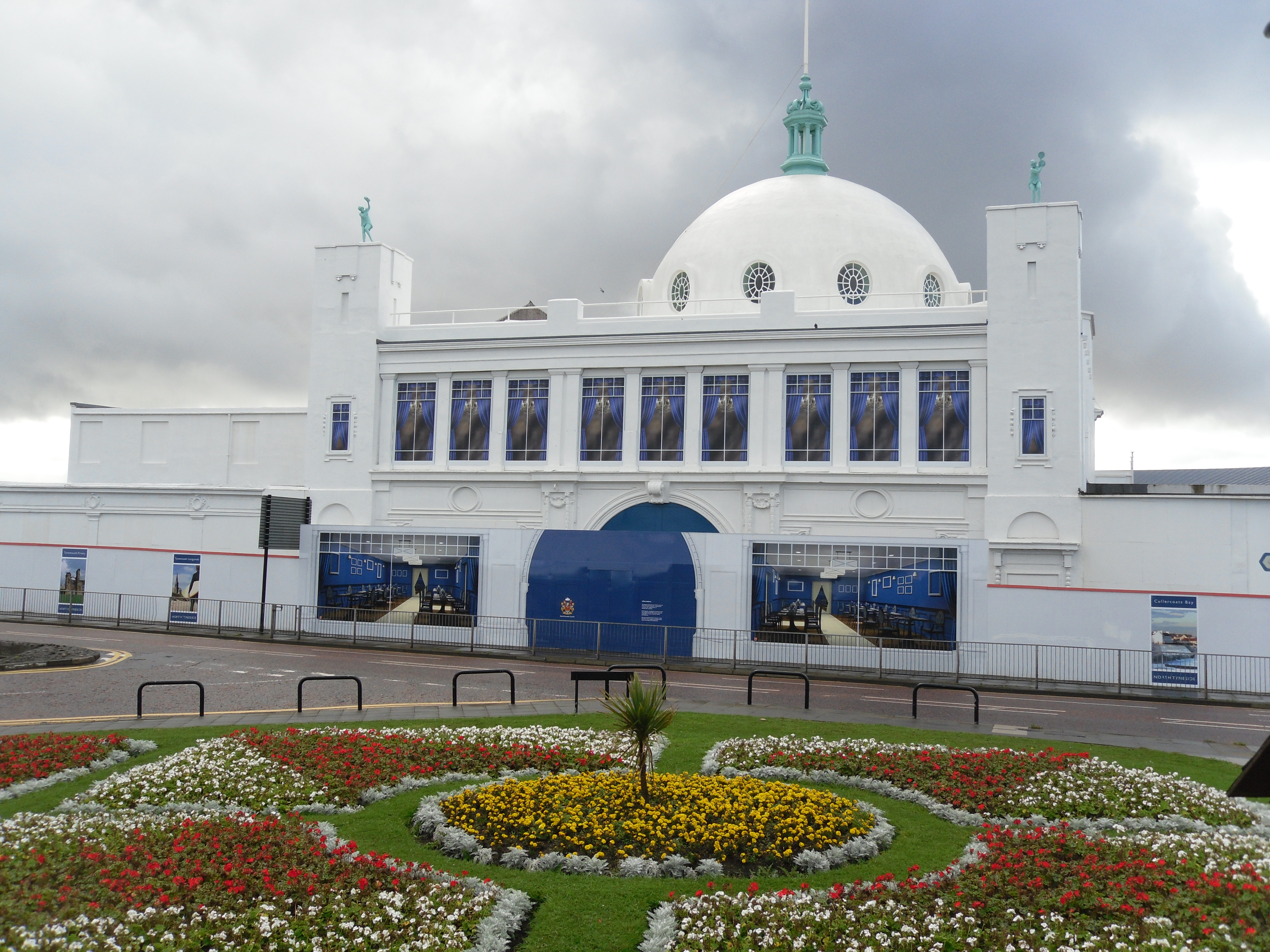
September 2010

Postcard, 1910

Postcard, 1910

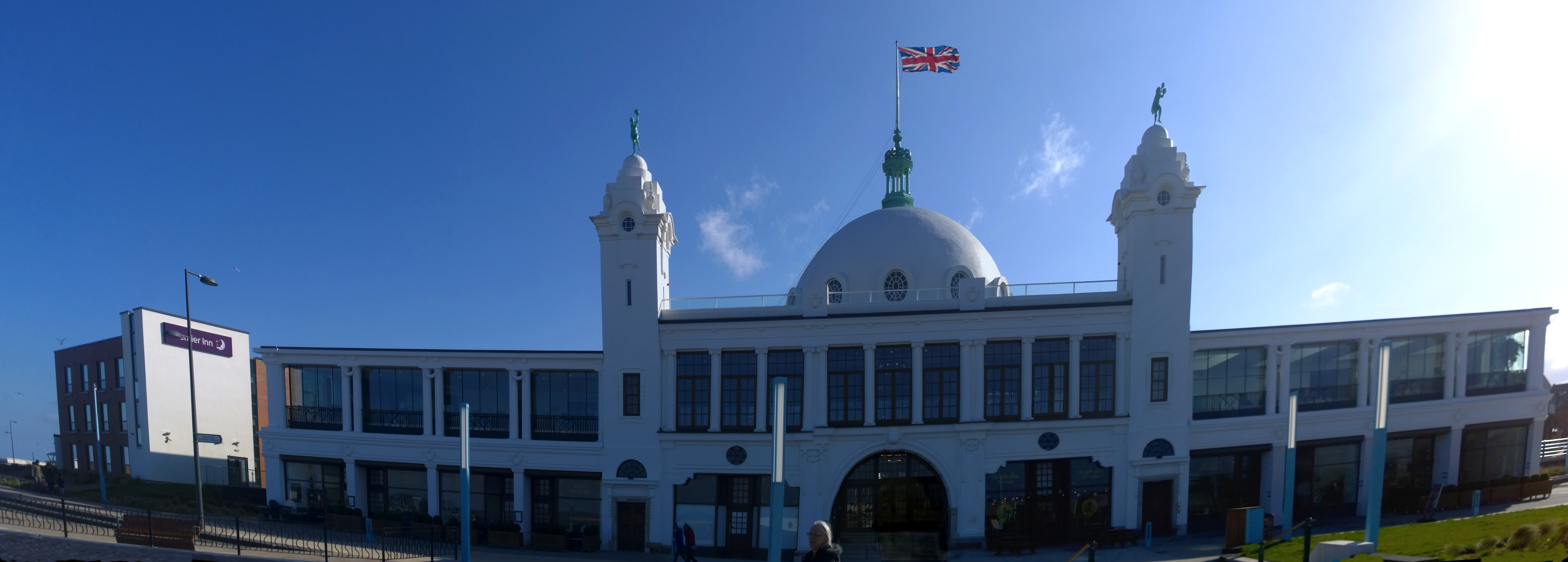
Spanish City Panorama 2019, Whitley Bay, UK.
