= Spanish City (novel) =

2002 novel by Sarah May

- First edition (publ. Chatto & Windus)
- Author: Sarah May
- Language: English
- Publisher: Chatto & Windus
- Publication date: 2002
- ISBN: 0-7011-7281-9 (first edition)
- Dewey Decimal: 823.914
- LC Class: PR6063.A8843 S67

Spanish City is the second novel by the British author Sarah May. It was first published in 2002 and is set in the fictional town of Setton on the north-eastern coast of England. The chronology of the novel stretches from 1926 until 1981, although much of the narrative is related by means of flashbacks.

== Plot summary ==
The novel opens in 1926 in Utah where a designer of roller-coasters called Delaval is overseeing the construction of a pleasure palace called Spanish City.

The novel then moves to circa 1980, when an ageing schoolteacher, Hal Price, is kidnapped at gunpoint by two teenaged brothers, Victor and Will, who are former pupils. Hal is taken to a nearby café and, while Victor awaits a message, recounts the story of his life to Will. Hal tells of joining the army as a teenager in 1944 and being sent to Normandy where he befriends Perkins, an ambitious Londoner who has an affair with Stella Armstrong, a spirited nurse. After a mysterious shooting incident, Stella disappears, accompanied by Major Delaval, the son of a wealthy Setton businessman and landowner.

After the war, Hal returns to Setton and becomes a teacher who enjoys dancing at the local Palace ballroom in the company of his cousin Ray Clarke, an undertaker. Perkins, who has become a private investigator, is engaged by Delaval to find Stella, who is believed to be travelling the world visiting funfairs and pleasure gardens. Delaval intends to fulfil his father's dream of building a funfair named Spanish City in Setton, with the hope of luring Stella to the town. As the funfair is about to open, Hal spots Perkins at the Palace and discovers that the body of a woman believed to have drowned in a boating accident has been delivered to Ray's premises. The woman, who is revealed as Stella, revives and is taken away by Perkins. Delaval arrives in Setton and tells Hal that he has an unrequited love for Stella, just as his own father once had a similar passion for Charlie, Hal's mother, who once worked for the Setton family and accompanied Delaval's father on a trip to Utah where the pair visited the funfair that was to inspire Spanish City.

Perkins and Stella begin living together, and raise a son, Victor. It is an unhappy relationship, and Hal begins an affair with Stella, who becomes pregnant with Will. Perkins sets fire to his own car in an attempt to kill himself and Stella, and both are believed to have died, leaving Victor and Will to be adopted.

Back in the present, Victor receives a message and takes Will and Hal to the abandoned Palace ballroom, where they are met by Ray Clarke and Irene Trench, a friend who knows the truth about the relationships between Perkins, Stella, the Price family, and the Delavals. Ray reveals that, although Perkins died in the car fire, Stella escaped and disappeared once more. Victor, furious at Ray's decision to withhold this knowledge, and at the truth about Will's parentage, opens fire with his gun while Hal shelters Will.

In an epilogue, Hal and Stella pay a visit to the flooded ruins of the Utah funfair that inspired Spanish City.

== Correspondences within the novel ==
Setton is loosely based on the north-eastern English coastal resort of Whitley Bay, where the funfair, ballroom and pleasure palace collectively named The Spanish City was once located. Spanish city was closed for years, but was reopened in late 2018 after a regeneration effort. The building now functions as an event venue, and also has bars and restaurants.

The town and river of Wiley in the novel, along with its ferry, are probably based on the town and river of Blyth, a few miles to the north of Whitley Bay. Blyth also once had a ferry that carried passengers from the main part of the town to the small community of North Blyth.

The cafe named Moscadini's may have been inspired by the Rendezvous Cafe, a long-established premises on the northern seafront of Whitley Bay. Like Moscadini's, The Rendezvous has a large mural of a Mediterranean scene on one of its internal walls. The Rendezvous inspired a poem by the Newcastle-based writer Julia Darling.

The Palace Ballroom may have been inspired by the Empire Ballroom, which was part of the Spanish City development. As in the novel, this later became a bingo hall. The space beneath the dome briefly served as an indoor skateboarding park and a venue for rock bands.

St Mary's Island is an actual tidal island, complete with lighthouse, between Whitley Bay and the village of Old Hartley.

As in the map of Setton provided at the beginning of the novel, Whitley Bay contains a cemetery, a Co-op, a seafront promenade and a former railway station now used by the Tyneside metro system. There is no colliery, although a quarry and a number of small coal pits were dug before housing development firmly established the town as a residential and recreational area in the late 19th century.

The street named Marine Parade does not exist, but there are streets in Whitley Bay named (for example) South Parade, North Parade, Marine Avenue and Marine Gardens.

A street named Front Street exists in nearby Tynemouth, as does a boating lake (although a paddling pool once existed on the seafront in Whitley Bay).
