= Chris Cross (magician) =

English contortionist, magician and escapologist

- Born: Christopher Alfred Goode; 22 April 1989 (age 37); Newcastle General Hospital, Newcastle-upon-Tyne, England
- Spouse: Single

Comedy career
- Years active: 2000 – present
- Medium: Escapology, magic (illusion), comedy, close-up magic
- Website: chris-cross.co.uk

Christopher Alfred Goode (born 22 April 1989), better known as Chris Cross, is an English magician, escapologist, and former contortionist. He has performed worldwide and appeared on British television.

== Early years ==
Cross was born in 1989 at Newcastle General Hospital in Newcastle-upon-Tyne, England. At the age of 10, he learned his first magic trick, a trick called The Coin Vanisher. By the time he reached 13, he had begun to perform semi-professionally in various bars, casinos, and nightclubs in the city centre of Newcastle, even receiving tips for his performances. He incorporated his natural abilities of dislocation and contortion into his stage act, which also featured comedy and magic. This act was presented as a street show and later as a cabaret at various holiday parks along the south coast of England. Upon reaching 16 years of age, he made the decision to leave school and pursue his career as a full-time entertainer.

== Career ==
Cross now performs close-up magic and cabaret acts of escapology, but he has retired as a contortionist due to arthritis in his shoulders as a result of performing his dislocation act for over 10 years. He won the UK Cabaret Championship 'Beat the Wand' Trophy at The Blackpool Magic Convention in the Blackpool Winter Gardens at the 'Blackpool Magic Convention' in 2009. He was also nominated for Young Businessman and Entrepreneur of the Year by the Evening Chronicle newspaper. The majority of Cross's performances are now at festivals around the world, and private and corporate events in the UK. In 2014 and 2015, he won the title of Best North East Wedding Entertainer (Non-Musical) from the UK Wedding Industry Awards. He also won Best Wedding Fair Exhibitor as voted for by the public at the Stadium of Light in 2014 and at St. James' Park in 2016. Cross won the award for Outstanding Customer Service at the North of England Wedding Awards 2014, organised by The Wedding Guide, and again in 2016 winning the Judge's Choice award at York Racecourse. He was also nominated for The Journal's North East Culture Awards in 2016.

A regular on the independent festival scene, Cross has performed at numerous events across the country, including Glastonbury, Kendal Calling, T in the Park, Hard Rock Calling, The North East Chilli Festival and BOMFest,

Cross has performed his one-man stand-up comedy contortion and escapology show with the titles Chris Cross is Escaping from Reality, Loose Cannon and Cunning Stunts over 100 times between 2008 and 2016 at the Voodoo Rooms during the Edinburgh Fringe Festival, gaining 4-star reviews from Broadway Baby and others.

In September 2010, Cross acted as the compere for the Liverpool Tattoo Convention to general praise, which resulted in Cross returning on four more occasions for the Convention. In the same year, Cross was booked to appear at The Bahrain International Circuit Formula One in Bahrain, The World Buskers Festival in Christchurch, New Zealand, The Slipper Room in New York City, as well as various cabaret clubs in Paris, London, and Los Angeles. Cross also appeared on Greek TV in May 2010, where he was a semi-finalist on Greece's Got Talent.

Cross has entertained numerous celebrities with his magic tricks and performances, including: Tulisa of N-Dubz at the launch of KAZAM mobile phones at The Raffles Club in Chelsea, DJ Yella of NWA backstage at a gig in Dublin, Miles Kane, lead singer in The Last Shadow Puppets with Alex Turner of The Arctic Monkeys, William Shatner, known as Captain James Kirk from the TV sci-fi show Star Trek at a sci-fi convention in Manchester, and The Prince of Wales. Cross is also endorsed by various Royal Warrant holders, including Thresher & Glenny Outfitters of London, Globetrotter Luggage, and other companies, such as Gaziano Girling of Savile Row, London. Cross challenged former two-time undisputed heavyweight boxing champion of the world, Mike Tyson, to a contest of strength. Tyson had 90 seconds to tie Cross up using all of his strength, and Cross had 90 seconds to use all of his strength to make the escape, which he succeeded at. After the Fun Challenge, Tyson appeared on ESPN's Sportsnation TV Show in America, where they played a clip of the stunt. Mike said He was one Crazy Dude, he had me feeling in danger of my life and stuff! This led to a string of other challenges, including proving he was faster than Sugar Ray Leonard, with Leonard saying, You're too fast for me, Chris! and challenging Jeremy Bulloch, who played Boba Fett in the original Star Wars trilogy, to chain him up. Cross escaped, claiming I escaped from the greatest bounty hunter in the galaxy! Cross then went on to challenge former Green Cross Code Man, David Prowse, who played Darth Vader in the original Star Wars trilogy too, saying he wanted to prove the Force was stronger with him than Vader. He demonstrated some 'mind control'-appearing card tricks to Prowse, who said the force was with Chris – not me!

He also performed at the Jongleurs/Highlight comedy clubs with Bob Slayer's 'Rock & Roll Circus' in December 2010.

Cross has notably performed upside-down straitjacket escape stunts both on TV and at events. He was tied in a straitjacket and suspended by his ankles, upside-down, from a crane over the Newport River in Wales at the Big Splash Festival, and the following year he performed another upside-down straitjacket escape off the bridge itself over the river. Cross also performed this stunt, hanging over 100 ft in the air from the top of the Newcastle Castle Keep, as a tribute to one of his heroes, Harry Houdini, which made the front page of The Journal Newspaper.

In 2013, Cross appeared on the Bafta Award-winning children's TV show, The Slammer, hosted by Ted Robbins, on CBBC with an escapology stunt he created himself, involving chains, padlocks, and a trapdoor on a platform that opened onto sharp spikes. It was originally performed on Greece's Got Talent TV Show in Greece, and Cross was asked to duplicate the stunt for the British TV show. In the same year, Cross was hired by BBC Worldwide as the magic and escapology consultant on The Hairy Bikers stage tour. He had to teach them some basic escapology for their live stage show, and Cross also supported Brit-Pop band, Simon & Oscar from Ocean Colour Scene at a gig in Newcastle.

In 2014, he appeared on BBC One on The One Show alongside Gyles Brandreth, where Cross performed an upside-down straitjacket escape and chatted about famous British escapologist, Allan Allan, who had just died. American illusionists Penn and Teller also appeared on the same show.

On 27 July 2014, Chris Cross was the last-ever act to perform at the original Spanish City Dome in Whitley Bay, before builders got underway with the re-developments. The Dome was a venue for many entertainers and bands over the last century, including The Animals. It was the inspiration for the Dire Straits song "Romeo and Juliet". Alan Clark (keyboardist) even sent a message to Cross to read out on the evening of the last show. One year later, in 2015, an inflatable dome venue was inflated next to the actual dome to stage The Under the Dome Festival, 2015 and Cross was the closing act here too.

In August 2015, Cross organised, and promoted, and co-starred in Geordie Legends: Them off The Viz! at The Tyne Theatre, celebrating 30 years of the iconic Geordie comic, VIZ, being in national distribution. Co-founders of the Comic, brothers, Chris Donald and Simon Donald both attended and took part in a Q&A's on stage with fans. The evening was sold out, so a second date was added, which sold out too. £1,525.00 was raised from the evenings and donated to local charity St. Oswalds Hospice. To commemorate the show, Chris Donald created a comic strip called Chris Cross – He's at a Loss (as to how to become a VIZ Comic Character!) which saw Chris Cross the magician meeting famous VIZ characters in each frame, such as The Fat Slags, Roger Mellie and Felix and his Amazing Underpants. 200 limited edition prints were printed and signed by both Cross and Donald and sold on the evening of the Shows. Simon Donald also had Cross appearing in a charity fundraiser for Dyslexia North East at a later date.

On 18 June 2015, Cross organised, promoted and co-starred in The Chris Cross & Paul Daniels Magic Show featuring The Lovely Debbie McGee! at his Quayside Cabaret Club in Newcastle. Paul Daniels was one of Cross's inspirations, and Paul gave him various advice and constructive criticism over the years. Following the sold-out show in 2015, Paul, Cross and Debbie McGee were scheduled to play a mini-tour of just a few dates mid-2016 in the North of England. Following Paul's death, Cross staged a tribute to Paul Daniels at his Quayside Cabaret Club in Newcastle Upon Tyne on 19 May. The event raised £1,235.00 for brain tumour research. Debbie McGee said she was Very moved and touched that Chris decided to put on a tribute to Paul and publicly thanked Cross on her radio show on BBC Radio Berkshire. The show was promoted on Good Morning Britain on ITV, BBC Radio Newcastle, Metro Radio and in The Newcastle Evening Chronicle newspaper. (Cross later purchased a lot of original props and illusions, belonging to Daniels, that were found in a farmers barn in Wales, as reported in Teesside Live)

In January 2016, Cross broke the fifth metacarpal on his right hand whilst rehearsing a new escapology stunt, which meant he had to learn lots of his tricks one handed to get him through gigs that were booked in whilst his right hand was recovering. He broke it by accidentally hitting it on a marble table in his living room whilst rehearsing a stunt for The Greatest Show on the Tyne.

In August 2016, Cross made Front Page News on the Journal Newspaper, as well as other regional press, when he performed an upside-down straitjacket escape, hanging over 100 ft in the air by his ankles above the roof of Newcastle's Castle Keep in a tribute stunt to Harry Houdini, who also visited the roof of the castle keep on his visit to the region in 1920. Geordie Actress Charlie Hardwick assisted Cross in the stunt too.

On 7 September 2016, Cross was hired to support Geordie Rockstar and lead singer of the British band The Animals, Eric Burdon at a gig which took place at Newcastle City Hall. During his warm-up act a drunken audience member tried to get on to the stage to start a fight with Chris. The intoxicated audience member was escorted off the premises by event security. The cause of the upset was a joke delivered by Cross about the audience member sitting in the cheap seats.

In February 2017, Cross organised Purely Belter - The 18th Birthday Party. Purely Belter is one of Cross's favourite films and he decided to host an 18th anniversary to celebrate the release of the Geordie cult movie. This saw a Q&A session and a re-union of the cast including actors: Tim Healy, Chris Beattie, Greg McLane, Val McLane (Sister of Jimmy Nail), Charlie Richmond, Charlie Hardwick & other cast members. The event raised £2,000 for local charities.

In May 2017, Cross staged An Evening with The Bounty Hunter featuring actor Jeremy Bulloch who played the part of Boba Fett in the original Star Wars Trilogy, most notably in the Empire Strikes Back Movie. Jeremy appeared on the Evening with show in Newcastle, which consisted of a screening of a Star Wars film, as well as a Q&A with Jeremy in front of a live audience. Jeremy & his wife stayed with Cross at his home in Newcastle on the night of the event.

In September 2017, Tim Healy invited Cross on set of Still Open All Hours, a British sitcom based on the original Ronnie Barker Open All Hours Comedy TV Show. They were recording the Christmas special in Scarborough. Cross performed for the cast and crew, including Sir David Jason. In October 2017, Rothbury Auction House sold a vintage dressing screen that once belonged to Rod Clements, a member of the band Lindisfarne (band), who wrote the folk hit song Meet Me on the Corner. The screen was used on the vinyl single record cover for the song. Cross won the auction, bidding against others from outside of the region. He said he thought it was important that a piece of Geordie history should stay in Newcastle.

In April 2019, Cross held a 30th Birthday Party, which was attended by various sports, comedy and television personalities and featured a comedy set by Bobby Davro

In June 2019, American magician David Blaine called Cross on stage, to be a surprise special guest as part of his only UK tour at The Edinburgh Playhouse Cross performed a card trick using Blaine's large tank of water, to over 3,000 people in the audience. Later in 2019, Cross toured ten theatres in the North of England with his stage show, titled The Great Magician of the North.

== Performing during the pandemic ==
On 9 February 2020, Cross staged a show with Martin Daniels the son of his hero Paul Daniels, titled It's Magic... Up North! at The Tyne Theatre and Opera House which took place just before the COVID-19 lockdown in the United Kingdom.

During the pandemic, Cross performed and taught basic beginner-level magic tricks online

The popularity of his online magic lessons encouraged him to stage the first drive-in magic lesson in the world, which took place in Morpeth, Northumberland on 29 October 2020.

After the pandemic, Cross resumed his live performances. In April 2022, he performed for Sam Fender at his birthday party.

== Recent years ==
In 2023, Cross turned the guest WC of his home into a shrine to the North-East of England. Calling it 'The Bog on the Tyne', after the famous Lindisfarne (band) song The Fog on the Tyne. The collection on display includes memorabilia from Catherine Cookson, Alan Shearer, Mark Knopfler and other famous people from the North-East of England. The Newcastle United F.C. fifth all-time top goal scorer, Malcolm Macdonald, cut the ribbon and announced the toilet formally open.

During the pandemic, Cross had been hired as the hand stunt double for French actor Vincent Cassel for an Apple TV series titled Liaison, which aired in 2023. Cross had to use the hypermobility in his hands to escape from handcuffs, whilst holding a gun. The scene was filmed with former Bond girl (Vesper Lynd), the French actress, Eva Green assisting Cross to escape from the handcuffs.

In August 2023, Cross was invited to perform at the 'Lisboa Magica' street magic festival by Portuguese magician Luís de Matos and for the past five years, he has organised and hosted his own international magic festival in Whickham in the North-East of England, featuring stars from the world of magic.

In November 2025, Cross embarked on his first tour since the pandemic. He performed an intimate parlour magic show titled CHRIS CROSS: Up Close & Magic which toured for 17 dates at hotels, small theatres and in restaurant private dining rooms around the UK.

In 2026, BBC Radio Newcastle invited Cross in to their studio to chat about his upcoming events.

On Friday 13 February 2026, Cross brought his parlour magic show to Close House, Northumberland for his friends charitable foundation, Sir.Graham Wylie, co-founder of the Sage Group. The show was sold out and 100% of all ticket sales were donated to The Sir. Graham Wylie foundation.

In March 2026, it was announced that there would be another milestone anniversary event for the cult north-east Film4 movie Purely Belter, celebrating 25 years since the film was released on video. Once again, this was organised by Cross, who is a self-confessed number one fan of the film. The evening featured a screening of the entire movie, followed by Q&A with some original cast members. Val McLane (sister of Jimmy Nail), who also appeared in the film, donated an original signed script, which was raffled along with other prizes to raise money for The Alan Shearer Centre.

After the film was screened, another screening took place on the same evening. A brand new short comedy film created specially for the celebration event. Titled 'Purely Belter: One Last Mission', it shows the original characters from the film, but only 25 years later, still trying to get their season tickets. It's a short British comedy film, also shot in the North-East of England. Written and directed by Cross, starring Charlie Hardwick, Chris Beattie, Jamie Stanley & Malcolm Macdonald. The original actor for the character of Sewell didn't wish to be involved, so Cross played the part of Sewell himself, to general acclaim.

Cross has been challenged to perform his upside-down straitjacket escapology daredevil stunt once again, from the roof of the The Castle, Newcastle. The challenge is to escape 10 seconds faster, even though he is 10 years older than he last attempted the escape, in 2016. The challenge has been accepted and the escape is set for 19 July 2026 at 3pm. The escapology performance will also honour 100 years since the death of Harry Houdini.

== The Geordie Book and DVD of Magic ==
Chris Cross became an author of The Geordie Book of Magic in 2017. The book features illustrations by Davey Jones from The Viz Comic and a foreword by Debbie McGee, widow of the late famous British magician Paul Daniels. The book teaches a dozen North-East themed magic tricks and includes special tricks cards, along with a DVD showing performances and explanations how to do each trick. The DVD features many Geordie stars, including actor Tim Healy, actress Charlie Hardwick, Ray Laidlaw the drummer from Lindisfarne (band), English former professional football Malcolm Macdonald, also known as Supermac, and other notable North-East celebrities.

== The Greatest Show on the Tyne ==
Cross is the owner, artistic director and creator of The Greatest Show on the Tyne

In 2010, Cross set up his own cabaret show at Madame JoJo's in Soho, London – The Carny Cabaret Show. He hosted the show and hired in cabaret performers from around the UK to perform alongside him, mostly local London performers such as Bruce Airhead, Kiki Lovechild, Equador the Wizard, Frisky and Mannish, Lorraine Bowen and Sophia Landi.

This show ran for six dates before moving nationwide.

From May 2012, the Carny Cabaret was gigging a bi-monthly residency at Alexander's Jazz Theatre in Chester Throughout 2011, the show ran for corporate functions, including Microsoft and at The Grosvenor Casino.

In 2015, the show was re-branded as The Quayside Cabaret Club and moved to a restaurant in Newcastle upon Tyne, where every show sold out and critics gave it positive reviews.

On 2 September 2016, the bi-monthly show changed its name to The Greatest Show on the Tyne and became an annual show to take place every year at The Tyne Theatre and Opera House , which is the oldest working Victorian theatre in the world and has a capacity of 1,100 people.

In an article in NE1 Magazine he was referred to as The North-East's King of Variety. Besides, in the North-East Theatre Guide, the reviewer described the show as a Northern Saturday Night at The Palladium.

The Greatest Show on the Tyne was repeated as planned in 2017 with all new acts and also in November 2018. The show has no future dates planned.
