= Sarah May =

English novelist

Sarah May is an English author. Her first book, The Nudist Colony (1999), was shortlisted for the Guardian First Book Award. Her other books include Spanish City (2002), The Internationals (2003), The Rise and Fall of the Queen of Suburbia (2006), and Becky (2023). A reviewer in The Guardian wrote of Spanish City: "the world conjured into view by May's slanted approach to scene and dialogue is peculiarly charged and vivid."
