= Private Line (band) =

Finnish hard rock band

- Origin: Helsinki, Finland
- Genres: Hard rock, sleaze rock, glam metal
- Years active: 1996–2019 2024–present
- Labels: King Foo; Bad Habits; Playground Scandinavia; JVC Victor Japan; Edel Italy; Dynamo Brazil; SOYUZ Russia
- Members: Sammy Aaltonen; Jack Smack; Illy; Spit; Eliaz; Rory Winston
- Past members: Jari Huttunen; Janne Kulju
- Website: www.privatelineweb.com

Private Line are a Finnish hard rock band from Helsinki, formed during the mid-1990s in Jyväskylä.

== History ==
=== Origins ===
The band was founded in the 1990s, when the founding members, Sammy, Jari Huttunen, and Eliaz were still teenagers. They bonded through love of Hanoi Rocks and Mötley Crüe. Private Line won a local band competition and used the prize money from it to record and release their debut EP Smooth Motions in 1998.

After recording Smooth Motions, the band brought in two new members: Spit and Illy. Together, they recorded a five-song promo CD. Founding member and guitarist Jari left the band and joined in Finnish heavy metal act Timo Rautiainen & Trio Niskalaukaus in May 2002.

=== Re-forming Private Line (2002) ===
Six Songs of Hellcity Trendkill (released December 2002)

While in Helsinki in 2002, vocalist Sammy met a guitarist named Jack, who was previously playing in a band called Rockers Unite!. He was asked to join in the band and gave a new breath of life to Private Line. Jack knew the band and was fan of theirs already before deciding to join them. Jack played two shows with the band before actually becoming a member. Jack's first official performance as a guitarist of Private Line was 25 May 2002 at the club S-Osis in Turku, Finland.

=== Six Songs of Hellcity Trendkill (2002) ===
The band started rehearsing new songs during the summer of 2002 and entered the studio in August 2002. Private Line recorded 5 songs in the Jyväskylä Lutakko studios. In December 2002, they released their second CD-EP Six Songs of Hellcity Trendkill with a revamped, energy-filled style with hard R'N'R riffs flavored with synthesizers. The band used three earlier recorded songs "Makin' a Mess Since'77", "Grown Like Others", "Crack In Reality" and three new songs "Superstar I.Q.", "Downstairs Upstairs" and "Virgin Suicide" for the new EP. The EP got positive reviews from the Finnish rock media as well as glam- and hard rock-orientated webzines. After the Hellcity Trendkill release, Private Line got their first booking agency deal signed with the Sam Agency Oy.

Private Line toured a lot during the year of 2003 with bands like Negative, Peer Gunt and Hybrid Children and started to build up their fanbase in Finland.

The band also worked on new songs during the tour and at the end of 2003 they entered the studio to record their forthcoming single "Forever and a Day". The single also included the tracks "Cheerleaders & Dopedealers" and "Sleep Tight", an old Private Line song from the 1990s.

=== Debut album 21st Century Pirates (2004) ===
"Forever and a Day" was released before the album in February 2004 and it reached #3 in the Finnish Singles Chart. "Sleep Tight" could also be heard in the Finnish box-office hit movie and soundtrack Levottomat3 by Solar Films Inc. in February 2004.

2004 saw the appearance of the band's debut full-length album 21st Century Pirates. The album reached #18 at the official Finnish Top40 record charts at its first week.

Norway's Scream Magazine gave the album a 4 out of 6 score, though the reviewer did not have much to detract. The album both featured "strong tunes", good degree of variation, punch and heaviness. Another Norwegian magazine Exact gave the same score.

The second single from the debut album carrying the name "1-800-Out-of-Nowhere" was put out in June 2004 and reached #4 in the Finnish single charts. The video of the song stayed on MTV's Up North Top10 video chart for 10 weeks.

In September 2004, 21st Century Pirates was also released in Japan by JVC Victor Entertainment and later the same year in Australia, New Zealand, Italy, Russia, Sweden and Ukraine.

A third single (released December 2004) from the album, called "Already Dead" brought the band more success with another top 5 charting in their native Finland. The single release consisted also 3 songs "While God Saves I Destroy", White-Collar Crime, Cheerleaders 6 Dopedealers" live video from Tampere at Tullikamari, Pakkahuone.

The band toured for the album in countries including Japan, Italy, Spain, England, Germany, Sweden and Russia. They supported also acts like Mötley Crüe (two shows in Helsinki and Turku, June 2005), Alice Cooper (in Turin, July 2005), D-A-D (five shows Scandinavian tour, Stockholm, Gothenburg, Helsinki, Turku, Tampere in October 2005) and Brides of Destruction, a band featuring Nikki Sixx and Tracii Guns, in their hometown Helsinki at the Tavastia Club in June 2004.

=== Evel Knievel Factor (2006) ===
From their forthcoming album, Private Line unveiled a new single on 31 May 2006 called "Broken Promised Land". The video of the song that was shot in Las Vegas Flamingo Hotel and Nevada desert and was inspired by the Fear and Loathing in Las Vegas movie, featured Finnish porn star and celebrity Rakel Liekki. The single reached #4 on the Finnish singles chart. The single featured another song from the upcoming album, called "Uniform"'.

In October 2006 they released a new song entitled "Alive" on their MySpace page and revealed that the new album would be called Evel Knievel Factor. The album was released on 1 November, and reached #23 on the Finnish albums chart.

Evel Knievel Factor (released 1 November 2006)

Evel Knievel Factor-album was also released in Ukraine, Japan by JVC@Victor Entertainment, Russia by Dance Paradise/Soyuz, Brazil, Chile, Argentina in South America by Dynamo Records, Sweden by Playground Scandinavia.

A second single from the album, called "Sound Advice", was released on 31 January 2007, and reached #2 on the singles chart in Finland. Lyrics to "Sound Advice" as well as to "Gods of Rewind" and "Billion Star Hotel" were written in collaboration with American playwright Rory Winston. The "Sound Advice" single also featured two previously unreleased songs, "Tokyo" ("Tokyo" was released also on Evel Knievel Factor's Japan version with the cover version of the Cheap Tricks song "He's A Whore") and "Criminal". "Criminal" is originally by Finnish rock band Smack. It also included the music video for the song "Broken Promised Land".

Evel Knievel Factor received 5 out of 5 in Sweden's Sydsvenskan, whose reviewer also included the album in his Album of the Year list. Melodic reviewed the album with positive adjectives, calling individual songs and riffs "a dynamite rocker in the Backyard Babies vein" and "as heavy as a B52 bomber", ultimately landing on 3.5 out of 5 stars.

=== 2007–present ===
The video of "Sound Advice" was shot in MTV3 studios in Helsinki by Vasara Films. It reached #1 on the Finnish music TV channel VoiceTV and stayed there for 10 consecutive weeks.

"Sound Advice" was also featured on the soundtrack of the Finnish box-office hit movie (over 200,000 viewers in Finland) V2 – jäätynyt enkeli by Solar Films Inc.

During 2007, Private Line toured Finland, Sweden and Russia.

At the end of 2007, Private Line was asked to participate in the Pepsi Max campaign covering the main campaign song "More" written by hip-hop group The Black Eyed Peas. The band recorded their version of the song and it ended up in the Pepsi campaign during November and December 2007 in Finland. Pepsi bottles included the band's logo, a photo of the band and code for the song in the bottles' sticker.

Evel Knievel Factor album was released in Italy May 2008 by Edel Italy. In September 2008 the band made their first headline tour in Germany, Austria and Switzerland. The tour was called "Prozac Nation-tour 2008" and consisted of 11 shows.

In the end of 2008 band announced that they will start preparing their 3rd album.

During 2009 and 2010 the band played few club and festival shows in Finland and in Italy including new songs from their forthcoming album. Names of the songs were "Live, Learn And Grow Apart", "13th Step From The Grave", "Down Came The Rain" and "Deathbedtime Stories".

After a couple of years break Private Line released a new single and music video "Dead Decade" from their forthcoming third album with the same name. The album was released in March 2011 by King Foo Entertainment and JVC Victor, and reached #17 on the Finnish albums chart.

== Members ==
Current

- Sammy – vocals, guitar
- Eliaz – drums, vocals
- Illy – guitar, synthesizer, programming, vocals
- Spit – bass, vocals

Special collaborator

- Rory Winston with Sammy – lyrics

Former

- Jari Huttunen – guitar (1996–2002)
- Janne Kulju – bass (1996–1999)
- Jack Smack – guitar, vocals (1996–2024)

== Discography ==
=== Albums ===
- 21st Century Pirates (2004)
- Evel Knievel Factor (2006)
- Dead Decade (2011)

=== EP ===
- Smooth Motions (1998)
- Promo (2000)
- Six Songs of Hellcity Trendkill (December 2002)

=== Singles ===
- "Forever and a Day" (February 2004) (4 weeks in official Finnish charts, best chart position #3)
- "1-800-Out-of-Nowhere" (June 2004) (6 weeks in official Finnish charts, best chart position #4)
- "Already Dead" (December 2004) (4 weeks in official Finnish charts, best chart position #6)
- "Broken Promised Land" (May 2006) (11 weeks in official Finnish charts, best chart position #4)
- "Sound Advice" (February 2007) (7 weeks in official Finnish charts, best chart position #2)
- "Dead Decade" (April 2011)
