= Negative (Finnish band) =

Finnish rock band

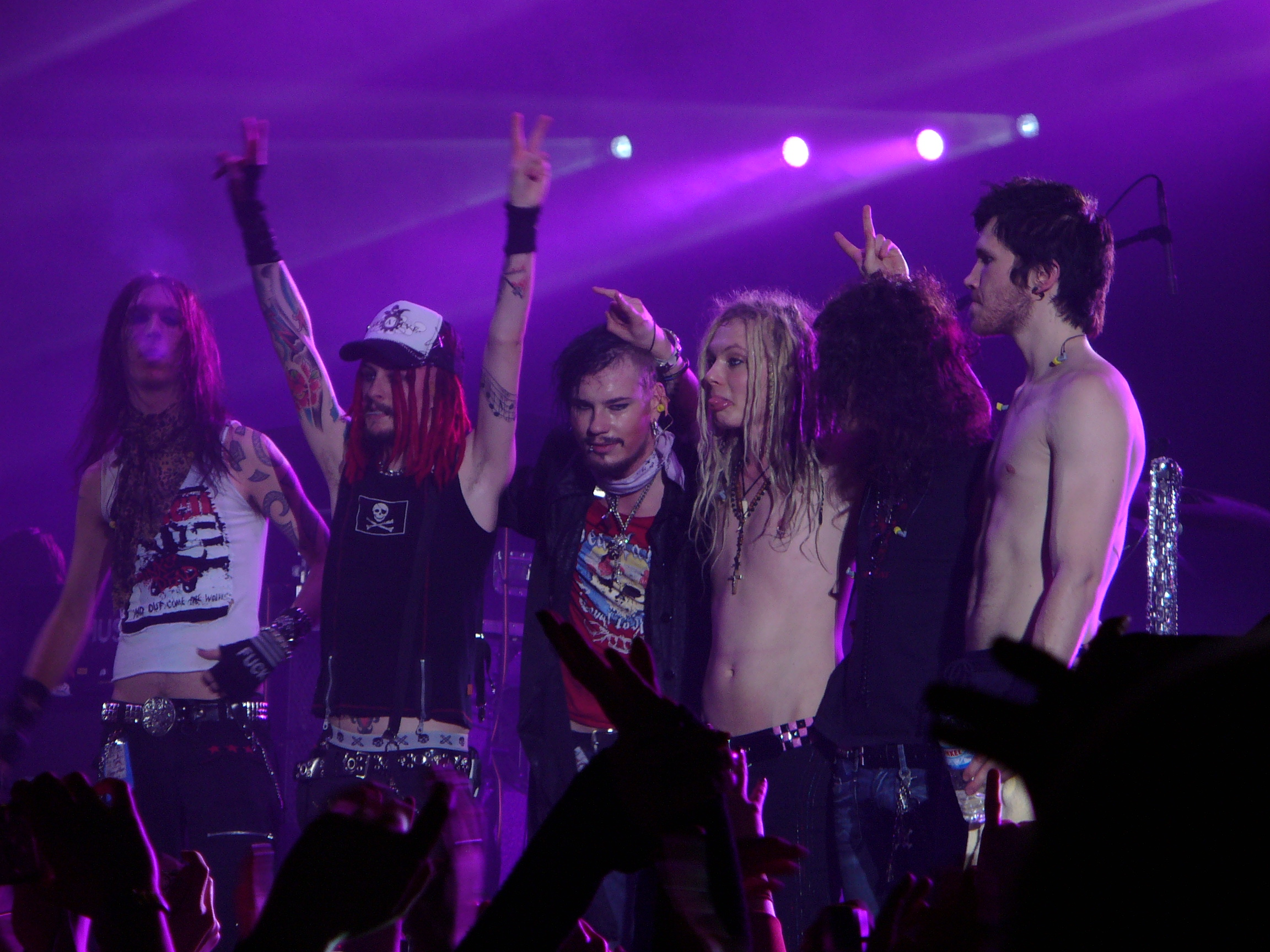

Background information
- Origin: Tampere, Finland
- Genres: Glam rock; hard rock
- Years active: 1997–present
- Labels: Hype Records, JVC Japan
- Members: Jonne Aaron Liimatainen; Antti Anatomy; Mr. Snack/Nakki; Jay Slammer; Max Fender

Negative is a Finnish glam rock band founded in Tampere in 1997. The band itself labels the music as "emotional rock'n roll".

== Members ==
=== Current ===
- Jonne Aaron Liimatainen – lead vocals
- Antti Anatomy – bass
- Mr. Snack/Nakki – keyboard, vocals
- Jay Slammer – drums
- Max Fender - guitar

=== Previous ===
- Sir Christus – guitar, vocals (died 2017)
- Larry Love – guitar
- Hata Salmi – guitar
- Gary – guitar (guitarist in a gig in summer 2008 – not an actual member of the band)
- Dmitry Martinov – bass (session member)

== Related bands ==
Jonne Aaron's younger brother, Ville Liimatainen, is the lead singer of the Finnish rock band, Flinch, who are managed by Hype Productions, the same label as Negative. He contributed backing vocals to Negative's cover of Queen's "Too Much Love Will Kill You" alongside Jussi Selo from Uniklubi (who also contributed to backing vocals on some Negative tracks), in which Jonne shared the limelight with Jann Wilde from Jann Wilde and Rose Avenue, and Christian from Dead By Gun. Sir Christus (guitar) previously played bass in his younger brother's band, Bloodpit. Antti Anatomy (bass) made a guest appearance as a vengeful brother in 2007's "Wise Men Don't Cry", released as a single from Bloodpit's second album, Off the Hook. Negative has toured with Jann Wilde and Rose Avenue before that band broke up (as they shared Tommi Liimatainen's management, who is Jonne's older brother.) as well as a triple team-up with The Rasmus and HIM in 2005. Teemu Rajamäki, bassist for Uniklubi, has also appeared as guest musician on some concerts.

== Hiatus ==
After being on hiatus for 13 years, the band returned back to stage at Manserock Stadionilla in Tampere. They also launched a new website.

== Discography ==
=== Albums ===
- War of Love (2003 – FIN #5)
- Sweet & Deceitful (2004 – FIN #1)
- Anorectic (2006 – FIN #1)
- Karma Killer (2008 – FIN #3)
- God Likes Your Style (2009) [B Sides]
- Neon (2010)

=== Singles ===
- "After All" (2003 – FIN #4)
- "The Moment of Our Love" (2003 – FIN #1)
- "Still Alive" (2004 – FIN #4)
- "Frozen to Lose It All" (2004 – FIN #1)
- "In My Heaven" (2004 – FIN #1)
- "My My, Hey Hey" (2005 – FIN #1)
- "Dark Side (Until You're Mine)" (2005 – FIN #2)
- "Bright Side (About My Sorrow)" (2005 – FIN #2)
- "The Moment of Our Love (Intl. Release)" (2005 – GER #28)
- "Planet of the Sun" (2006 – FIN #1)
- "Sinners Night / Misty Morning" (2006 – FIN #2)
- "Fading Yourself" (2007 – FIN #1)
- "Won't Let Go" (2008)
- "Giving Up!" (2008)
- "End of the Line* (2010)
- "Jealous Sky" (2010)
- "Believe" (2011)

=== DVDs ===
- In the Eye of the Hurricane (2008 – FIN #1)
