= Sir Christus =

Finnish musician (1978–2017)

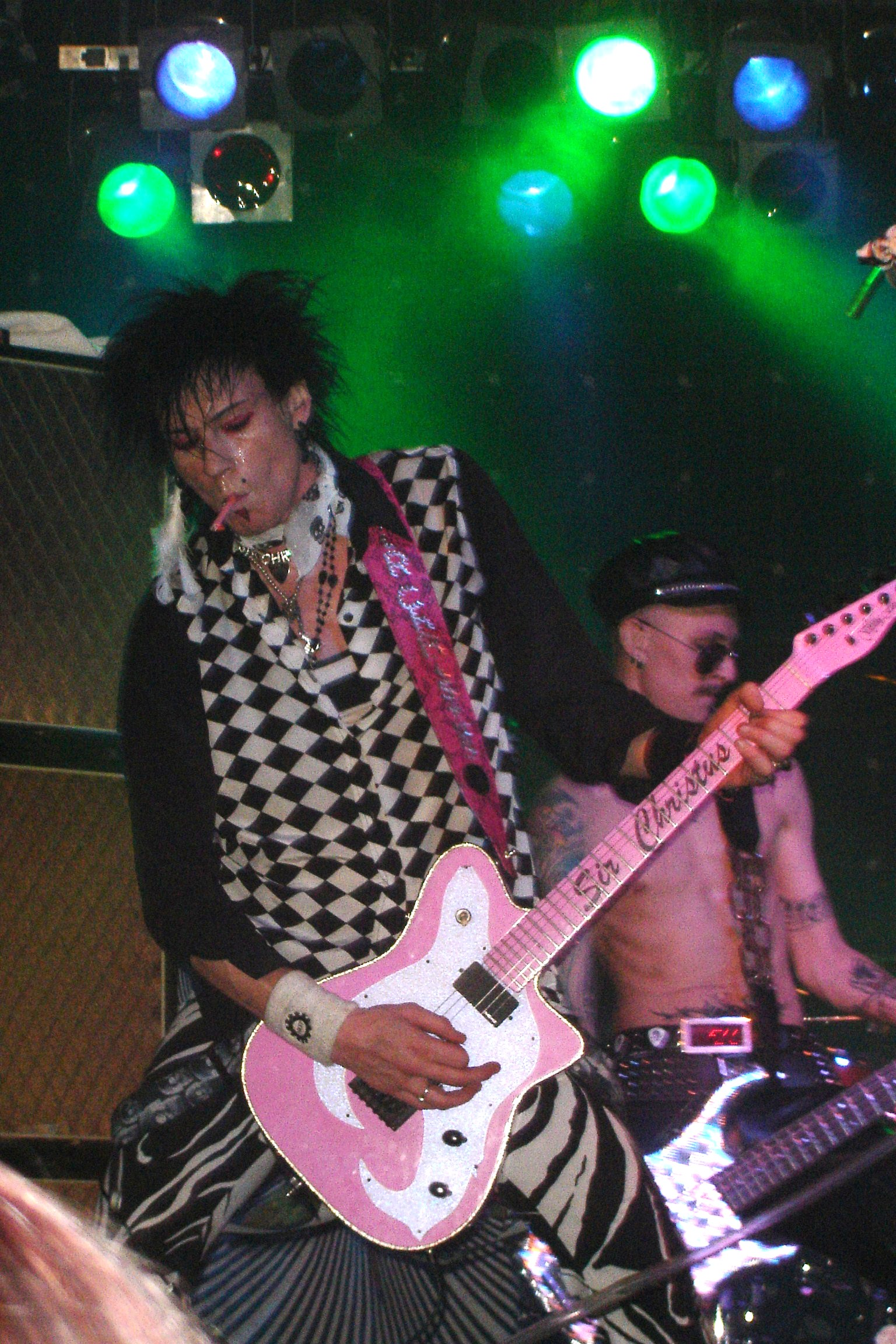
Christus and the Jukka-Palm. Also The Pink Lady, his number one guitar and trademark.

Sir Christus (born Jukka Kristian Mikkonen; April 10, 1978 – December 7, 2017) was a Finnish guitarist, best known as the former rhythm guitarist of the glam rock band Negative. His father was Arwo Mikkonen, guitarist of the Finnish rock band Popeda. His father died in 1986, leaving eight-year-old Christus and his four-year-old brother Matthau without a father figure in their life.

On Negative's single "Fading Yourself" (March 14, 2007), Sir Christus did vocals for a bonus track: "Lost in America" (originally by Alice Cooper). Negative has never performed this song live. Christus performed this song live, with the band Private Line, on November 28, 2007.

== Previous projects ==
=== SnoWhite ===
SnoWhite, formerly known as Blaquarium, was founded in winter 2007 by Dino, Purtsi, Julius and Vode. In June 2008 Rafaello joined the band, and their first gig was in Amadeus during Tammerfest, supporting another band. After that Vode decided to leave. Dino, Purtsi and Julius gave free hand to Rafaello to choose a new guitarist. He decided that Christus would be the best choice. The first gig as SnoWhite and not Blaquarium was in Vastavirta Klubi, Tampere supporting The Bitterlicks and The VooDoo Nights. "Is it my body" and "Number of the beast" were the only two cover-songs they are playing. SnoWhite's second gig, taking place in Vastavirtaklubi in Tampere September 13, 2008, has got positive reviews by Aamulehti. Sir Christus left SnoWhite on 3 January 2010.

=== Black Jesus ===
Christus has had a side project since fall 2007 that is called Black Jesus - the name was later changed to Black Jezus and then changed back to Black Jesus. When he left Negative, at first people thought Christus had disappeared but then there were dates announced in February.

There were speculations about Christus and his position in this band, and the band was thought to be what it was to begin with: a side project, a mere base for playing some shows and cover songs and have some fun. The band split in late 2008 and played their last gig in Somero in November 2008.

=== Matthau Mikojan ===
Shortly after Christus' leaving Negative, there were rumours that he would join his brother's solo-project on bass. It was not until late that Matthau himself announced his line up that the rumours were confirmed. Christus played the guitar still, and not the bass. He was thought to be only a part of the live shows, like the rest of the line up. Matthau announced on his website after the German Tour (Schraubelocker Tour 2008) that the three-piece band is now a band and not a solo-project with a live band.

In March/early April a music video was shot for the song "Too Fortunate to Cry", in which Matthau and Christus appear.

Christus left this project after three months and the band will not replace him.

=== Negative ===
Negative is a Finnish glam rock band located in Tampere. They released their first album, War of Love in 2003. War of Love has sold gold in Finland and is now close to platinum. In 2004 they came with their second album, Sweet & Deceitful that has also sold gold. Late 2006 Anorectic made its appearance.

Christus joined the band in 2002.

As of January 15, 2008, Sir Christus was no longer a part of this band.

=== Bloodpit ===
Christus was in Bloodpit from 2000 to 2002, playing the bass guitar. In Bloodpit he used the stage name Christian Grigory.

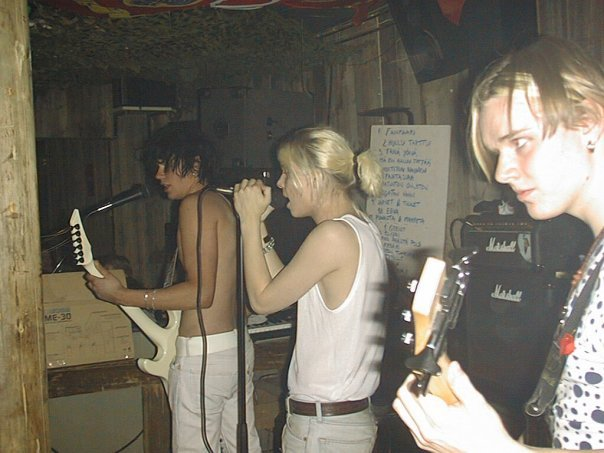
Lavasäteily

=== Lavasäteily ===
This band existed from 1999 to 2004.

Christus seems to have been the vocalist rather than the guitarist. In this band and other former bands before/simultaneously, he used the name Claudio Emil.

== Death ==
He died December 7, 2017. No cause of death was revealed, although his father died of heart failure in 1986.
