= List of middle schools in England =

Middle schools in England are defined in English and Welsh law as schools in which the age range of pupils starts younger than 10 years and six months and finishes older than 12 years of age.

The number of middle schools, including combined schools for children aged between 5 and 12, reached a peak of over 1400 by 1983. In 2019 there were 107 middle schools remaining in England, operating in just 14 local authority areas.

== History ==
Middle schools were permitted by the Education Act 1964, which made additional arrangements to allow for schools which crossed the traditional primary-secondary threshold at age 11. Notably, these changes did not define a new type of school, but rather permitted a variation on existing schemes, while providing for regulations which allowed the Secretary of State to determine whether such schools should be treated as primary or secondary. This had not been provided for in the Education Act 1944.

The move, pushed forward by Alec Clegg, then Chief Education Officer of the West Riding of Yorkshire County Council, was initially part of a process to introduce comprehensive schools in secondary education. Clegg proposed a model of middle schools for students aged 9 to 13, crossing the traditional divide at age 11 as early as 1960, with the scheme fully implemented in September 1969. Earlier moves by the local authority in Leicestershire had seen the introduction of two-tier secondary schools for students aged 11 to 14, and 14 to 18 as early as the late 1950s.

The Education Act 1964 was followed in July 1965 by Circular 10/65 from the then Labour government requesting that local education authorities put forward plans to introduce comprehensive schools in their areas. However, the circular offered only limited support for a change to a three-tier model of middle schools, as the minister had already requested a review of the age of transfer to secondary schools as part of the Plowden enquiry into Children and their primary schools. The Plowden report published in 1967 encouraged the development of middle schools for students aged 8 to 12, developing from existing junior schools.

The law required that all schools were classified as either primary or secondary depending on the age range of students. By the 1970s, over 100 middle deemed secondary schools were in operation with around 30 deemed primary schools. The number of middle schools, including combined schools for children aged between 5 and 12, rose continuously over the next decade, reaching a peak of over 1400 such schools by 1983, with the primary model rapidly overtaking the secondary following the publication of the Plowden report. However, from that time onwards, the number of middle schools fell each year.

The introduction of the National Curriculum with set Key Stages aligned with the old primary/secondary model further affected the numbers of schools, with a quarter of middle schools closing in the five years after its introduction. Issues of falling rolls, and queries raised about the academic progress of students in three-tier systems led to further closures.

== Statistics ==
In 2019 there were 107 middle schools remaining in England, operating in 14 local authority areas, ranging from the 117-pupil Glendale Middle School in Northumberland, to the 1000-pupil Biggleswade Academy in Biggleswade, Bedfordshire.

In the table below, the URN refers to the unique reference number for each school, linking to its page on the Ofsted website. Also from the table below, it can be seen that middle deemed primary schools have now been almost completely abolished across England.

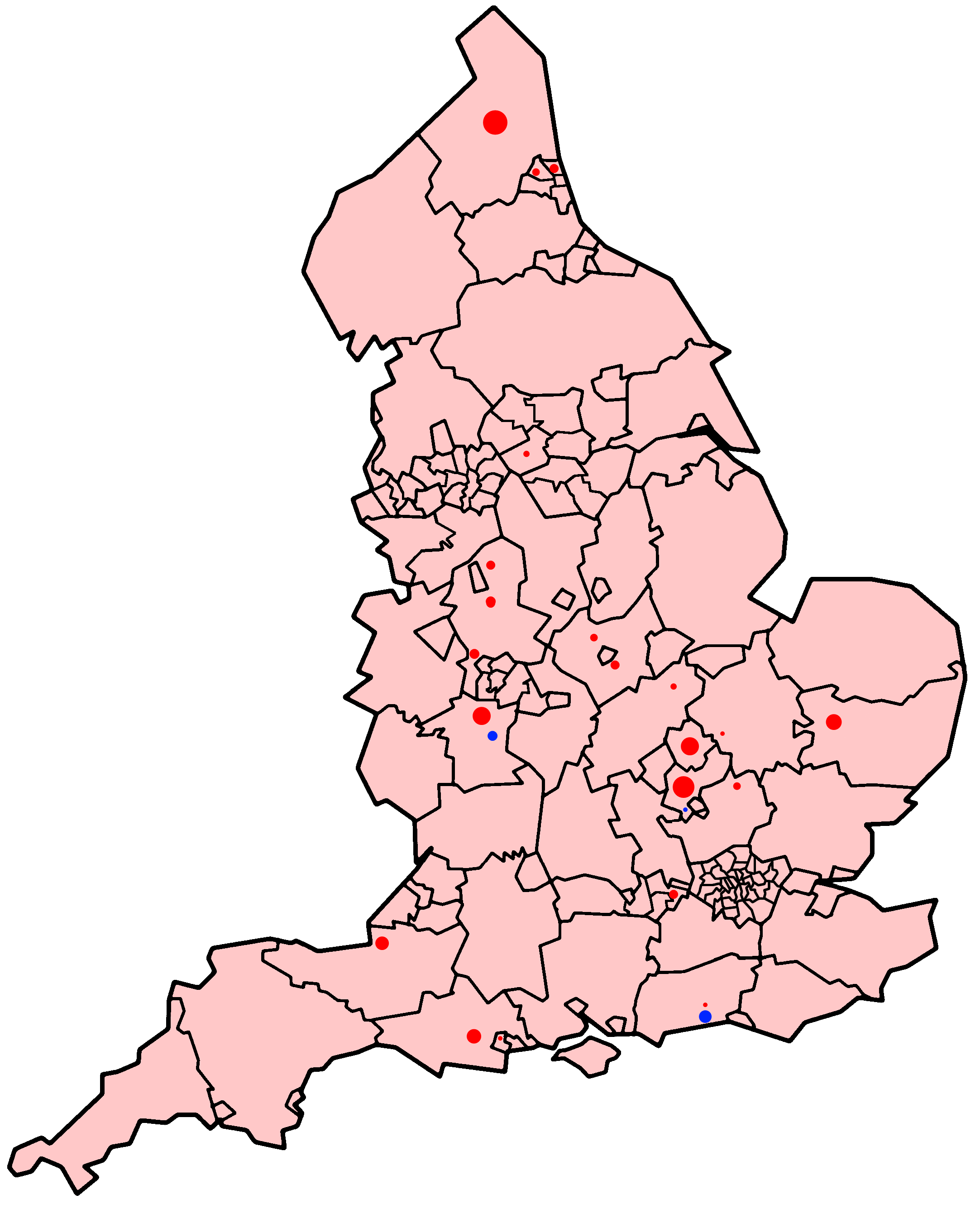
Indicative map of location and number of Middle Schools in England. Blue markers indicate primary middle schools; red markers indicate those deemed-Secondary.

== Middle schools ==
=== Bedford Borough ===
Schools in the unitary authority, operated by Bedfordshire County Council until April 2009. Following consultation in the summer of 2009 the authority intended to re-introduce two-tier provision from 2013, closing all middle schools by 2015. However, on 7 July 2010, it was announced that the change from 3-tier to 2-tier "would be scrapped"; the reason given being cuts in government funding to schools made by the Coalition Government. One Middle School closed in 2011 and two more closed in 2014. In July 2015, the borough council announced its intention to support schools in the introduction of a borough-wide move to two-tier provision. As a result, all but one middle school reorganised as primary or secondary by 2019.

Name	Location	Age Range	Deemed status	Number on Roll	URN	Website
Marston Vale Middle School	Stewartby	9–13	Secondary	464	145861	

=== Bournemouth, Christchurch and Poole ===
Poole Borough Council closed all of its middle-deemed-primary schools in August 2013. Bournemouth, Christchurch and Poole Council became the successor Local Education Authority in 2019.

Name	Location	Age Range	Deemed status	Number on Roll	URN	Website
Broadstone Middle School	Broadstone	9–13	Secondary	479	141184	

=== Central Bedfordshire ===
Schools in the unitary authority, operated by Bedfordshire County Council until April 2009. Some locality groups, such as schools in Dunstable, have undergone local re-organisations to remove middle schools. The local authority supports the principle of moving to primary and secondary provision.

Name	Location	Age Range	Deemed status	Number on Roll	URN	Website
Alameda Middle School	Ampthill	9–13	Secondary	715	137249	
Arnold Academy	Barton-le-Clay	9–13	Secondary	658	136829	
Brooklands Middle School	Leighton Buzzard	9–13	Secondary	518	137636	
Etonbury Academy (Note: Etonbury Academy is proposed to become secondary from 2023)	Arlesey	9–16	Secondary	1071	137632	
Fulbrook School	Woburn Sands	9–16	Secondary	425	137904	
Gilbert Inglefield Academy	Leighton Buzzard	9–13	Secondary	424	138003	
Holywell CE (VA) Middle School	Cranfield	9–13	Secondary	658	138844	
Leighton Middle School	Leighton Buzzard	9–13	Secondary	556	109689	
Linslade School	Linslade	9–13	Secondary	633	136766	
Parkfields Middle School	Toddington	9–13	Secondary	457	109662	
Pix Brook Academy	Arlesey	9–16	Secondary	720	147081	
Priory Academy	Dunstable	9–16	Secondary	699	138181	
Robert Bloomfield Academy	Shefford	9–13	Secondary	946	136713	
Woodland Middle School Academy	Flitwick	9–13	Secondary	621	136560	

=== Dorset ===
Name	Location	Age Range	Deemed status	Number on Roll	URN	Website
Allenbourn Middle School	Wimborne Minster	9–13	Secondary	600	113859	
Cranborne Middle School	Cranborne	9–13	Secondary	407	113853	
Dorchester Middle School	Dorchester	9–13	Secondary	617	138186	
Emmanuel CofE Middle School	Verwood	9–13	Secondary	410	113894	
Ferndown Middle School	Ferndown	9–13	Secondary	586	113878	
Lockyer's Middle School	Corfe Mullen	9–13	Secondary	466	113862	
St Mary's CofE Middle School	Puddletown	9–13	Secondary	481	138189	
St Michael's Church of England Middle School	Colehill	9–13	Secondary	577	113891	
St Osmund's Church of England Middle School	Dorchester	9–13	Secondary	701	138165	
West Moors Middle School	West Moors	9–13	Secondary	210	113861	

=== Hertfordshire ===
Name	Location	Age Range	Deemed status	Number on Roll	URN	Website
Edwinstree CofE Middle School	Buntingford	9–13	Secondary	434	117554	
Ralph Sadleir School	Puckeridge	9–13	Secondary	404	140249	
King James Academy, Royston	Royston	9–18	Secondary	911	137656	

=== Kirklees ===
Name	Location	Age Range	Deemed status	Number on Roll	URN	Website
Kirkburton Middle School	Kirkburton	10–13	Secondary	509	143791	
Scissett Middle School	Scissett	10–13	Secondary	599	143792	

=== Newcastle upon Tyne ===
A new school is proposed to open at Great Park, Gosforth in 2020, which will be a middle school with age range 9–16.

Name	Location	Age Range	Deemed status	Number on Roll	URN	Website
Gosforth Central Middle School	Gosforth	9–13	Secondary	514	108519	
Gosforth East Middle School	Gosforth	9–13	Secondary	512	108521	
Gosforth Junior High Academy (Note: Gosforth Junior High is federated with Gosforth High School)	Gosforth	9–13	Secondary	700	136348	

=== North Tyneside ===
Name	Location	Age Range	Deemed status	Number on Roll	URN	Website
Marden Bridge Middle School	Whitley Bay	9–13	Secondary	549	108635	
Monkseaton Middle School	Monkseaton	9–13	Secondary	294	108637	
Valley Gardens Middle School	Monkseaton	9–13	Secondary	762	108636	
Wellfield Middle School	South Wellfield	9–13	Secondary	323	108649	

=== Northumberland ===
Northumberland County Council began closing middle schools across the authority in 2006. This was discontinued as a universal policy following funding difficulties, but middle schools have continued to close, merge into all-through academies, or change to primaries, with 27 Northumberland middle schools having ceased to be middle schools since 2006 and four more closures approved: James Calvert Spence College - will cease to be a middle school from September 2025 becoming an 11-18 school while Glendale Middle School, Berwick Middle School and Tweedmouth Middle School will all close in 2026.

Name	Location	Age Range	Deemed status	Number on Roll	URN	Website
Bellingham Middle School	Bellingham	9–13	Secondary	95	122350	
Berwick Middle School	Berwick-upon-Tweed	9–13	Secondary	306	122354	
Chantry Middle School	Morpeth	9–13	Secondary	546	137747	
Corbridge Middle School	Corbridge	9–13	Secondary	349	122326	
Dr Thomlinson CE Middle School	Rothbury	9–13	Secondary	225	145639	
Glendale Middle School	Wooler	9–13	Secondary	115	122352	
Hexham Middle School	Hexham	9–13	Secondary	455	122364	
Highfield Middle School	Prudhoe	9–13	Secondary	419	122340	
Newminster Middle School	Morpeth	9–13	Secondary	526	137748	
Ovingham Middle School	Ovingham	9–13	Secondary	349	122341	
St Joseph's RC Middle School	Hexham	9–13	Secondary	336	122369	
Seaton Sluice Middle School	Seaton Sluice	9–13	Secondary	326	122334	
Tweedmouth Middle School	Berwick-upon-Tweed	9–13	Secondary	304	122348	
Whytrig Middle School	Seaton Delaval	9–13	Secondary	231	122335	

=== Somerset ===
Name	Location	Age Range	Deemed status	Number on Roll	URN	Website
Avanti Park School	Frome	4–13	Primary	452	147651	
Danesfield CofE Middle School	Williton	9–13	Secondary	318	123895	
Fairlands Middle School	Cheddar	9–13	Secondary	483	123888	
Hugh Sexey Church of England Middle School	Blackford	9–13	Secondary	585	123897	
Minehead Middle School	Minehead	9–13	Secondary	566	136774	
Oakfield Academy	Frome	9–13	Secondary	644	136970	
Selwood Academy	Frome	9–13	Secondary	631	137741	

=== Staffordshire ===
Name	Location	Age Range	Deemed status	Number on Roll	URN	Website
Bilbrook CofE Middle School	Codsall	9–13	Secondary	99	124453	
Brewood Middle CE Academy	Brewood	9–13	Secondary	420	124452	
Christ Church Academy	Stone	9–13	Secondary	580	136961	
Churnet View Middle School	Leek	9–13	Secondary	437	124436	
Codsall Middle School	Codsall	9–13	Secondary	546	124424	
James Bateman Middle School	Biddulph	9–13	Secondary	385	124428	
Oldfields Hall Middle School	Uttoxeter	9–13	Secondary	506	145376	
Penkridge Middle School	Penkridge	9–13	Secondary	454	144206	
Perton Middle School	Perton	9–13	Secondary	373	124437	
Ryecroft CE Middle School	Rocester	9–13	Secondary	201	145375	
St Edwards CofE(VA) Junior High School	Leek	9–13	Secondary	724	139171	
Walton Priory Middle School	Stone	9–13	Secondary	461	124426	
Windsor Park CE Middle School	Uttoxeter	9–13	Secondary	325	144007	
Woodhouse Academy	Biddulph	9–13	Secondary	452	124432	

=== Windsor and Maidenhead ===
Name	Location	Age Range	Deemed status	Number on Roll	URN	Website
Dedworth Middle School	Windsor	9–13	Secondary	505	110072	
St Edwards Royal Free Ecumenical Middle School	Windsor	9–13	Secondary	480	110086	
St Peter's Middle School, Old Windsor	Old Windsor	9–13	Secondary	220	110085	
Trevelyan Middle School	Windsor	9–13	Secondary	577	110075	

=== Worcestershire ===
Name	Location	Age Range	Deemed status	Number on Roll	URN	Website
Abbey Park Middle	Pershore	9–12	Primary	204	116774	
Alvechurch Church of England Middle School	Alvechurch	9–13	Secondary	431	143507	
Aston Fields Middle School	Bromsgrove	9–13	Secondary	585	116957	
Birchensale Middle School	Redditch	9–13	Secondary	553	116967	
Blackminster Middle	South Littleton	10–13	Secondary	164	116960	
Bredon Hill Academy	Ashton under Hill	10–13	Secondary	486	143395	
Catshill Middle School	Catshill	9–13	Secondary	307	116958	
Church Hill Middle	Redditch	9–13	Secondary	312	142543	
Ipsley CE RSA Academy	Winyates	9–13	Secondary	608	139020	
Parkside Middle	Bromsgrove	9–13	Secondary	558	116959	
St Barnabas CE First & Middle	Drakes Broughton	4–12	Primary	293	144334	
St Bede's Catholic Middle	Redditch	9–13	Secondary	644	116998	
St Egwin's Middle	Evesham	10–13	Secondary	433	116984	
St John's CE Middle	Bromsgrove	9–13	Secondary	640	139286	
St Nicholas' CE Middle	Pinvin	9–12	Primary	299	144257	
The De Montfort School	Evesham	10–18	Secondary	893	116932	
Walkwood CE Middle	Redditch	9–13	Secondary	677	139185	
Westacre Middle	Droitwich Spa	9–12	Primary	409	116778	
Witton Middle	Droitwich Spa	9–12	Primary	422	116779	
Woodfield Academy	Redditch	9–13	Secondary	516	138208	

== Authorities where middle schools have been discontinued ==
Many authorities in regions of England previously had middle schools, with either local areas or whole counties since reverting to the more traditional two-tier model. These are listed briefly by region.

=== East of England ===
Norfolk closed its last middle schools - which were deemed primary - in 2008. Suffolk began the process of closing its middle schools in 2006, having reduced its numbers from a high of 40 schools, with the final two schools closing several years after the others in 2023. The only middle school in Cambridgeshire (which fed into Bedfordshire upper schools) closed in 2018.

=== East Midlands ===
Northamptonshire closed its middle schools in and around Northampton in 2002, with its final two middle schools closing in 2015. Leicestershire had a number of middle schools which covered the 10-14 age range, alongside others which were for Key Stage 3 students (11–14). The last of the middle schools closed in 2017. Nottinghamshire formerly had a three tier system around Newark-on-Trent and in Mansfield, with the latter closing in 2001.

=== London ===
The London Borough of Harrow closed its middle deemed primary schools in 2011. The London Borough of Merton had about 14 middle schools for the 9-13 age range, which were converted to deemed-primary (8–12) schools in the 1990s. These schools reverted to primary use by 2002.

=== North East England ===
The three authorities with existing middle schools (Newcastle, Northumberland, North Tyneside) all closed several middle schools since 1999. A number of towns such as Hexham and Berwick-upon-Tweed still have middle schools.

=== North West England ===
None

=== South East England ===
Buckinghamshire's last middle schools closed in the 1990s. Hampshire inherited middle schools from Southampton City authority which had gone wholly three-tier in 1970 (one of the first two authorities to do so). The schools reverted to the traditional model in the 1990s. Isle of Wight middle schools closed in 2011. Kent's last three middle schools (on the Isle of Sheppey) closed in 2009. The Hoo Peninsula middle schools were reorganised in 1994. Milton Keynes' system of middle schools was converted to primary schools in 2008. Oxfordshire closed its last middle-deemed-primary schools in Oxford in 2003. West Sussex closed middle schools in Crawley in 2004, Adur in 2007, Midhurst & Petworth in 2009 and Worthing in 2015. Its last middle school closed in 2017.

=== South West England ===
Devon closed its only middle schools, in Exeter, in 2005. Dorset has closed a number of middle schools, including four which closed in 2013, as well as fourteen middle-deemed-primary schools which closed in the borough of Poole. Wiltshire closed its last middle schools in 2005.

=== West Midlands ===
Aldridge-Brownhills, Staffordshire (now West Midlands) - includes the towns of Aldridge and Brownhills as well as the villages of Pelsall and Streetly. Adopted 9–13 middle schools in 1972 (normally on different sites to 5-9 first schools) and retained this system until 1986, when the traditional age ranges were re-established. The authority had been merged into Walsall (which always had the traditional age ranges) in 1974.

Bewdley and Kidderminster, Worcestershire – adopted 9–13 middle schools in 1972, and the whole area retained this system after 1974 when the two boroughs merged to form Wyre Forest district council. The system was maintained until 2007, when the traditional age ranges were re-established throughout the area.

Dudley, West Midlands (formerly Staffordshire) – incorporating towns of Dudley, Sedgley, Coseley and Brierley Hill. Adopted 8–12 middle schools in 1972 (some on the same site or within the same umbrella as 5-8 first schools) and retained this system until 1990, when the traditional age ranges were re-established. This coincided with a major reorganisation in the borough which saw sixth form facilities largely concentrated in further education colleges rather than secondary schools, as well as several secondary schools being closed or merged.

Halesowen, West Midlands (formerly Worcestershire) – adopted 9–13 middle schools in 1972 and retained this system after 1974 when the town was absorbed into the borough of Dudley (see above) along with Stourbridge (which, along with Kingswinford, always used the traditional age ranges). Was one of the first local authorities to abolish middle schools when in 1982 the traditional age ranges were re-established. This reorganisation also saw the town's three secondary schools serving the 13-18 age range become 11-16 schools, with sixth form facilities concentrated at the expanded college in the town, while the town gained a fourth secondary school with the conversion of a former middle school into an 11-16 school.

Sutton Coldfield (which was in Warwickshire until 1974) adopted 5-8 first schools and 8–12 middle schools in 1972 and did so for 20 years before reverting to 5-7 infant and 7-11 junior schools in 1992.

Northern Warwickshire (the area covered by the boroughs of North Warwickshire, Nuneaton and Bedworth and Rugby – adopted 5–8 first schools and 8–12 middle schools in 1972 and retained this system until 1996, when it reverted to the traditional ages of transfer (which had always applied in the south of the county).

=== Yorkshire and the Humber ===
Bradford closed its middle schools between 1998 and 2002, having been the home of the first purpose-built middle school in the country. Kirklees local authority closed three middle schools in 2012. North Yorkshire's two middle schools (at Ingleton and Settle) closed in 2012. Leeds and Wakefield previously operated on the three-tier system before reverting during the 1990s.
