= List of schools in North Tyneside =

This is a list of schools in North Tyneside, Tyne and Wear, England.

== State-funded schools ==
=== Primary and first schools ===
- Amberely Primary School, Killingworth
- Appletree Gardens First School, Monkseaton
- Backworth Park Primary School, Backworth
- Bailey Green Primary School, Killingworth
- Balliol Primary School, Longbenton
- Battle Hill Primary School, Wallsend
- Benton Dene Primary School, Longbenton
- Burradon Community Primary School, Burradon
- Carville Primary School, Wallsend
- Christ Church CE Primary School, North Shields
- Collingwood Primary School, North Shields
- Coquet Park First School, Whitley Bay
- Cullercoats Primary School, Cullercoats
- Denbigh Community Primary School, Howdon
- Fordley Primary School, Dudley
- Forest Hall Primary School, Forest Hall
- Grasmere Academy, Killingworth
- Greenfields Community Primary School, Wideopen
- Hadrian Park Primary School, Wallsend
- Hazelwood Community Primary School, Wideopen
- Holystone Primary School, Holystone
- Ivy Road Primary School, Forest Hall
- King Edward Primary School, Preston
- Kings Priory School, Tynemouth
- Langley First School, Monkseaton
- Marine Park First School, Whitley Bay
- Monkhouse Primary School, North Shields
- New York Primary School, North Shields
- Percy Main Primary School, Percy Main
- Preston Grange Primary School, Preston
- Redesdale Primary School, Wallsend
- Richardson Dees Primary School, Wallsend
- Riverside Primary School, North Shields
- Rockcliffe First school, Whitley Bay
- St Aidan's RC Primary School, Wallsend
- St Bartholomew's CE Primary School, Longbenton
- St Bernadette's RC Primary, Wallsend
- St Columba's RC Primary School, Wallsend
- St Cuthbert's RC Primary School, North Shields
- St Joseph's RC Primary School, Chirton
- St Mary's RC Primary School, Cullercoats
- St Mary's RC Primary School, Forest Hall
- St Stephen's RC Primary School, Longbenton
- Shiremoor Primary School, Shiremoor
- South Wellfield First School, Wellfield
- Southridge First School, Whitley Bay
- Spring Gardens Primary School, North Shields
- Star of the Sea RC Primary School, Whitley Bay
- Stephenson Memorial Primary School, Wallsend
- Wallsend Jubilee Primary School, Wallsend
- Wallsend St Peter's CE Primary School, Wallsend
- Waterville Primary School, North Shields
- Western Community Primary School, Wallsend
- Westmoor Primary School, Killingworth
- Whitehouse Primary School, North Shields
- Whitley Lodge First School, Whitley Bay

=== Middle schools ===
- Marden Bridge Middle School, Whitley Bay
- Monkseaton Middle School, Monkseaton
- Valley Gardens Middle School, Monkseaton
- Wellfield Middle School, Wellfield

=== Secondary and upper schools ===
- Burnside College, Wallsend
- Churchill Community College, Wallsend
- George Stephenson High School, Killingworth
- John Spence Community High School, North Shields
- Kings Priory School, Tynemouth
- Longbenton High School, Longbenton
- Marden High School, Marden
- Monkseaton High School, Monkseaton
- Norham High School, North Shields
- North Gosforth Academy, Seaton Burn
- St Thomas More Roman Catholic Academy, North Shields
- Whitley Bay High School, Whitley Bay

=== Special and alternative schools ===
- Beacon Hill School, Wallsend
- Benton Dene School, Longbenton
- Moorbridge, Shiremoor
- Silverdale School, Howdon
- Southlands School, Tynemouth
- Woodlawn School, Monkseaton

=== Further education ===
- Tyne Metropolitan College

== Independent schools ==
=== Special and alternative schools ===
- Hopespring Newcastle, Longbenton
- ID Academy, Seaton Burn
- Parkside House School, Backworth
- Percy Hedley School, Killingworth
