= John Coxon =

John Coxon may refer to:

- John Coxon (pirate)
- John Coxon (footballer) (1922–1998), English footballer
- John Coxon (musician), member of English band Spring Heel Jack
