= Brierdene =

Stream valley in England

- Valley
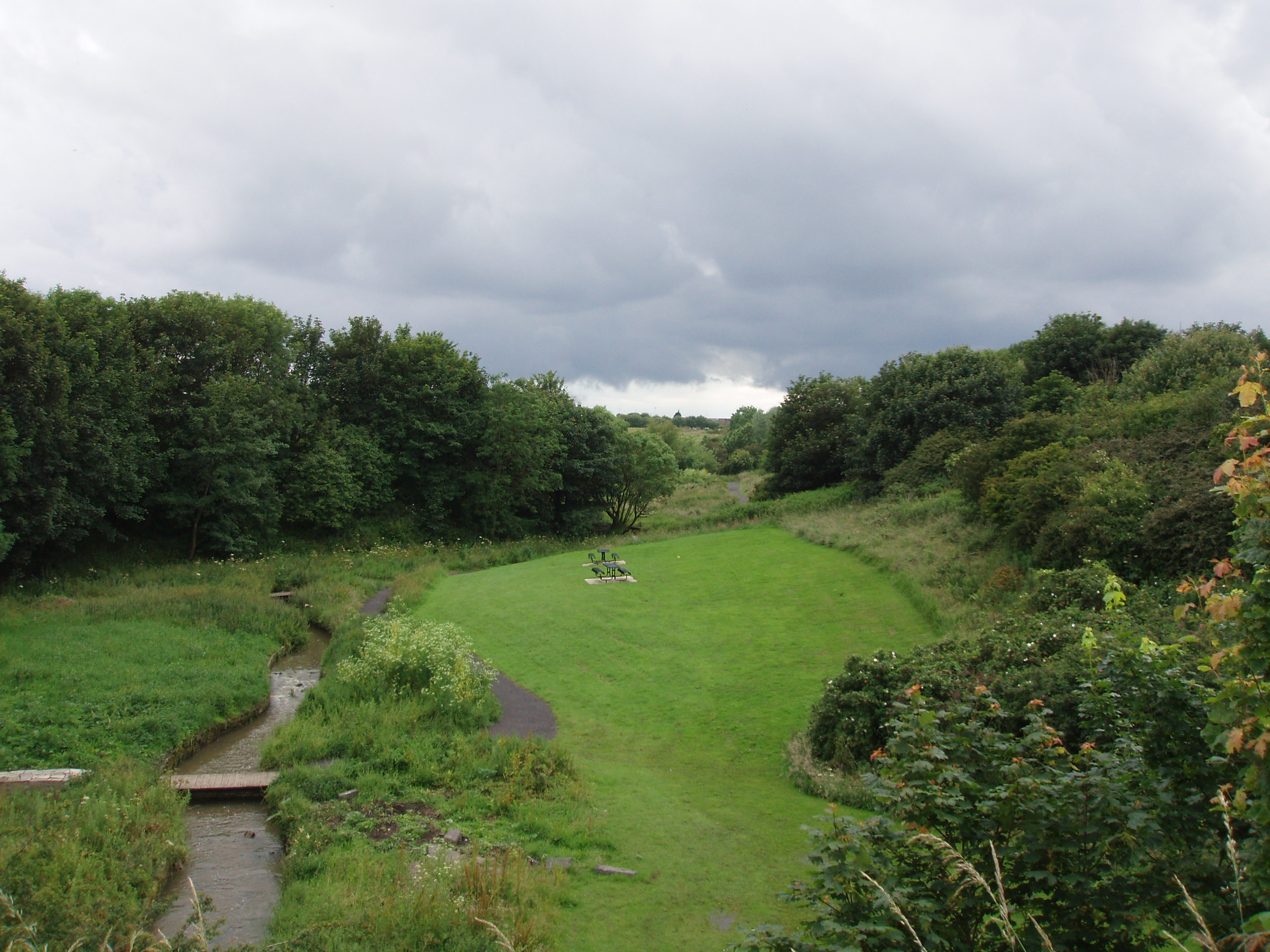

- Location in Tyne and Wear
- Coordinates: 55.059°N 1.470°W
- Grid position: NZ338739
- Location: Tyne and Wear and Northumberland, England, UK

Brierdene or Brier Dene is a small valley through which the Brierdene Burn flows down to its mouth at Whitley Bay. The valley was partly occupied by a coal mine in the past of which very little is now visible. Part of the valley is now the Brierdene Community Green Space and the Brierdene Wildlife Site. The site is now home to more than 1000 identified organisms and includes an ecologically diverse meadow and is a designated Site of Nature Conservation Importance. Much of work of transforming the valley into a wildlife refuge was undertaken by a voluntary group - the Friends of Brierdene. This work earned them a Queens Award for Voluntary Service.

The name Brierdene was also used for a railway station built in 1914 but which was never brought into use.

In April 2016 a new housing development at Backworth was started and adopted the name of Brierdene.
