= Geoff Allen (footballer) =

English footballer (born 1946)

Personal information
- Full name: Geoffrey Barry Allen
- Date of birth: 10 November 1946 (age 79)
- Place of birth: Walker, Newcastle upon Tyne, England
- Height: 5 ft 7 in (1.70 m)
- Position: Left winger

Youth career
- Newcastle United

Senior career*
Years	Team	Apps	(Gls)
1964–1970	Newcastle United	22	(1)
Total		22	(1)

International career
- England youth
- * Club domestic league appearances and goals

Geoffrey Barry Allen (born 10 November 1946) is an English former professional footballer who played as a left winger.

== Career ==
Born in Walker, Newcastle upon Tyne, Allen played for Newcastle United, making 22 appearances in the Football League, scoring 1 goal. He began his career as a junior and turned professional in February 1964, before making his first-team debut aged 17, in April 1964. He won the Inter-Cities Fairs Cup in 1969.

His career ended aged 23 following an injury, after 26 first-team appearances in all competitions, scoring 1 goal.

He was also an England youth international.

== Later life ==
He later became a football coach, living in Mansfield. His grandson Elliot Anderson is a footballer who played for Allen's former club, Newcastle United.
