= Elliot Anderson =

English footballer (born 2002)

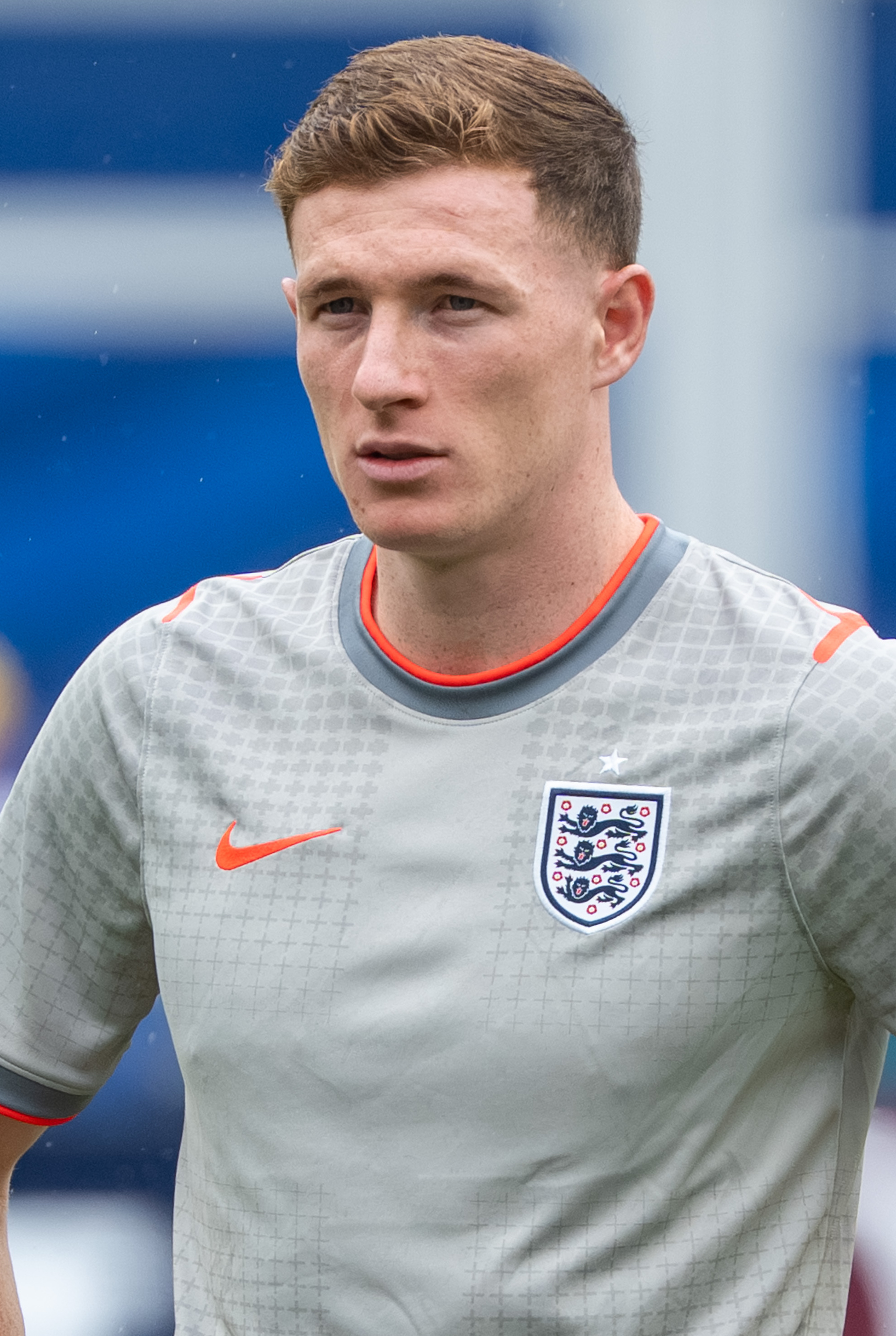
- Anderson with England in 2026

Personal information
- Full name: Elliot Junior Anderson
- Date of birth: 6 November 2002 (age 24)
- Place of birth: Whitley Bay, Tyne and Wear, England
- Height: 5 ft 10 in (1.79 m)
- Position: Midfielder

Team information
- Current team: Manchester City
- Number: 5

Youth career
- 2007–2010: Wallsend Boys Club
- 2010–2019: Newcastle United

Senior career*
Years	Team	Apps	(Gls)
2019–2024	Newcastle United	44	(0)
2022	→ Bristol Rovers (loan)	21	(7)
2024–2026	Nottingham Forest	75	(6)
2026–	Manchester City	11	(1)

International career^{‡}
2018	Scotland U16	1	(0)
2018–2019	Scotland U17	3	(0)
2019–2021	Scotland U18	2	(0)
2022	Scotland U21	1	(0)
2024–2025	England U21	12	(2)
2025–	England	23	(0)
Medal record
Men's football
Representing England
FIFA World Cup
Third place	2026 Canada–Mexico–US
UEFA European Under-21 Championship
Winner	2025 Slovakia
- * Club domestic league appearances and goals as of 23:49, 21 November 2026 (UTC) ‡ National team caps and goals as of 21:50, 15 November 2026 (UTC)

Elliot Junior Anderson (born 6 November 2002) is an English professional footballer who plays as a midfielder for Premier League club Manchester City and the England national team.

== Early life ==
Elliot Junior Anderson was born on 6 November 2002 in Whitley Bay, Tyne and Wear. He was a pupil at Valley Gardens Middle School and Whitley Bay High School. His maternal grandfather, Geoff Allen, played as an outside-left for Newcastle United from 1964 to 1968. He has two brothers including elder brother, Wil Anderson, who appeared on the eleventh series of Love Island.

== Club career ==
=== Newcastle United ===
Anderson first joined Newcastle United at the age of eight having previously been at Wallsend Boys Club and signed his first professional contract with the club in November 2019, signing another long-term deal a year later on his eighteenth birthday. On 9 January 2021, Anderson made his first-team debut in a 2–0 defeat to Arsenal in the third round of the FA Cup. On 18 January, Anderson made his Premier League debut against the same opposition in a 3–0 defeat, as an 87th-minute substitute.

==== Bristol Rovers (loan) ====
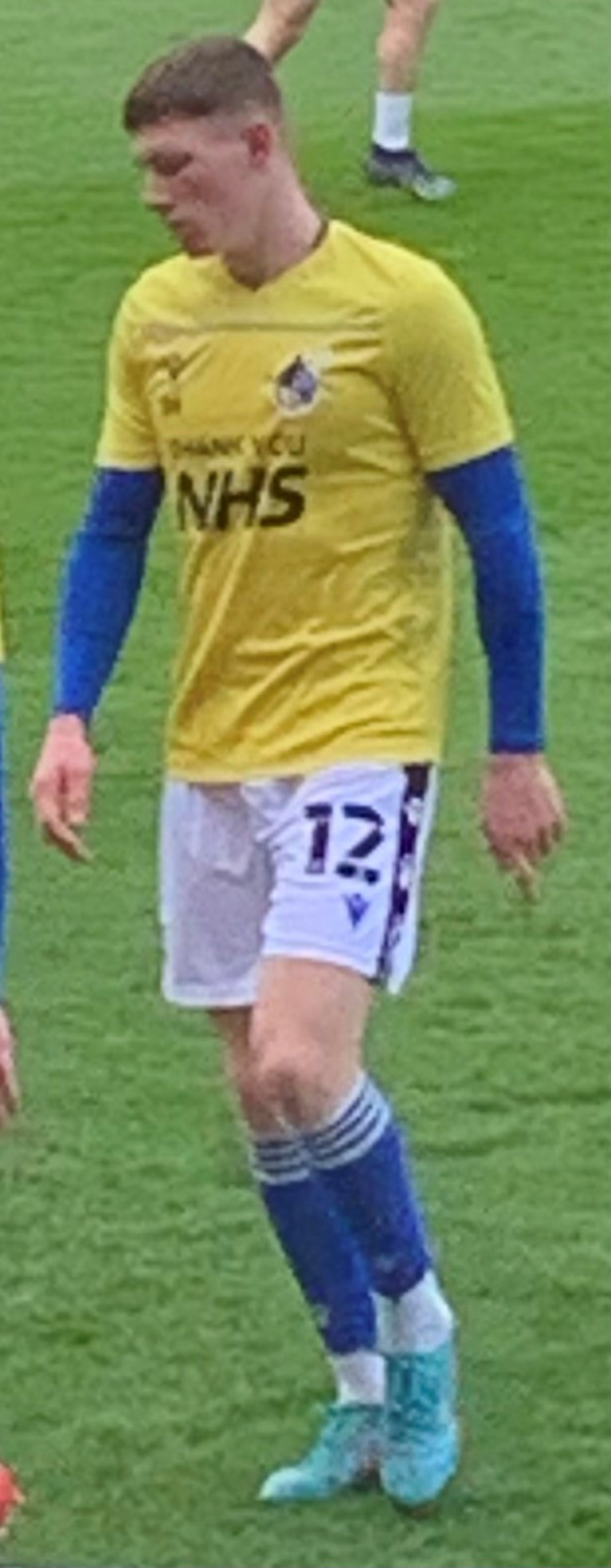
Anderson playing for Bristol Rovers in 2022

On 31 January 2022, Anderson joined League Two club Bristol Rovers on loan until the end of the 2021–22 season. He made his debut on 5 February, impressing off the bench in a 1–1 draw at Sutton United. Anderson opened his account for the club, scoring the first league goal of his career, with the second in a 4–0 away win at Stevenage before assisting Harry Anderson for the third goal four minutes later. Following a 1–0 victory over Colchester United in which Anderson scored the only goal of the game, his third goal for the club and scoring for a second consecutive match, manager and former Newcastle midfielder Joey Barton compared Anderson's movement in the penalty area to that of Diego Maradona.

Anderson was awarded the League Two Goal of the Month award for March 2022 for his impressive solo run and finish against Harrogate Town, receiving 50% of the public vote. On 7 May 2022, Anderson was awarded the EFL Young Player of the Month Award for April 2022 after three goals and two assists in six matches left Rovers close to an automatic promotion spot, later winning the EFL League Two Player of the Month Award too. That same day, the final league match of the season, Anderson scored Rovers' final goal in the 85th minute of a 7–0 win against Scunthorpe United. His goal moved Rovers above Northampton Town on a goals scored basis into the final automatic promotion spot, with the club returning to League One.

==== Return to Newcastle and breakthrough ====
On 21 September 2022, Anderson's breakthrough into the first-team was rewarded with a new long-term contract. On 26 February 2023, he came off the bench in the 91st minute of the 2023 EFL Cup final defeat to Manchester United. He was controversially denied a first Newcastle goal on 17 March 2023 at Nottingham Forest when his back-post header was ruled out by VAR. A decision described as "bizarre", while former referee Dermot Gallagher clarified with evidence that no offside law had been broken.

Anderson's development continued throughout the season, resulting in an increased presence in pre-season for the 2023–24 campaign, where he garnered much praise. In the season, Anderson's development continued with an increased first team presence, starting in four matches, and having substitute appearances in the other five Premier League matches, before he was sidelined for four months with a lower back injury. Anderson returned to the team on 27 February 2024, scoring in the penalty shoot-out against Blackburn Rovers in the FA Cup.

=== Nottingham Forest ===
On 1 July 2024, Anderson joined Premier League side Nottingham Forest for a reported fee of £35 million, signing a five-year contract with the club. A later article in The Daily Telegraph newspaper reported the transfer fee as "around £15 million". Following an impressive start to the season, he was named as the club's player of the month for August. On 19 January 2025, he scored his first Premier League goal in a 3–2 victory over Southampton. In the 2025–26 season, he finished the campaign as the league leader in touches (3,300), duels won (297), fouls won (80), and possessions won (306).

=== Manchester City ===
On 2 July 2026, Manchester City announced an agreement had been reached with Nottingham Forest for the transfer of Anderson. The reported fee of £116 million was a record for an English footballer, until Morgan Rogers joined Chelsea for £117 million just nineteen days later. On 23 July, Anderson officially signed for City, penning a five-year deal.

Anderson made his debut for the club on 16 August against Arsenal in the Community Shield at the Millennium Stadium, where he started and played 60 minutes. On 20 October 2026, Anderson scored his first goal for the club in a 5-1 home victory over AEK Athens in the Champions League.

== International career ==
=== Youth career ===
Born in England, Anderson is of English and Scottish descent with a grandmother on his father's side born in Glasgow and later residing in Whitley Bay. He was a youth international for Scotland at U16, U17 and U18 level. He switched his allegiance to England in March 2021, making his debut in an unofficial friendly for England under-19s against Arsenal U23s on 27 March 2021. Anderson was selected in the Scotland under-21 squad in November 2021. Anderson received a second call-up for the Scotland U21 squad in March 2022, instead opting to remain with his loan club Bristol Rovers. Anderson made his Scotland under-21 debut on 5 June as they held group leaders Belgium to a 0–0 draw. He withdrew from a later Scotland under-21 squad, as he wanted to keep other representative options open.

In August 2023, Anderson received his first call-up to the Scotland national team by head coach Steve Clarke, for a UEFA Euro 2024 qualifying match against Cyprus and a friendly against England, but pulled out due to injury.

On 30 August 2024, Anderson received a first call up to the England U21 squad for UEFA Euro U21 qualifying fixtures against Northern Ireland and Austria. Elliot made a further two appearances on the 11 and 15 October 2024. Against Ukraine and Azerbaijan, the latter of which he scored his first goal, in a 7–0 win.

Anderson was included in the England squad for the 2025 UEFA European Under-21 Championship. He scored the last goal of their quarter-final victory over Spain. Anderson started in the final as England defeated Germany after extra time to lift the trophy. His performances during the competition resulted in him being chosen by the UEFA Technical Observer panel for their team of the tournament.

=== Senior career ===
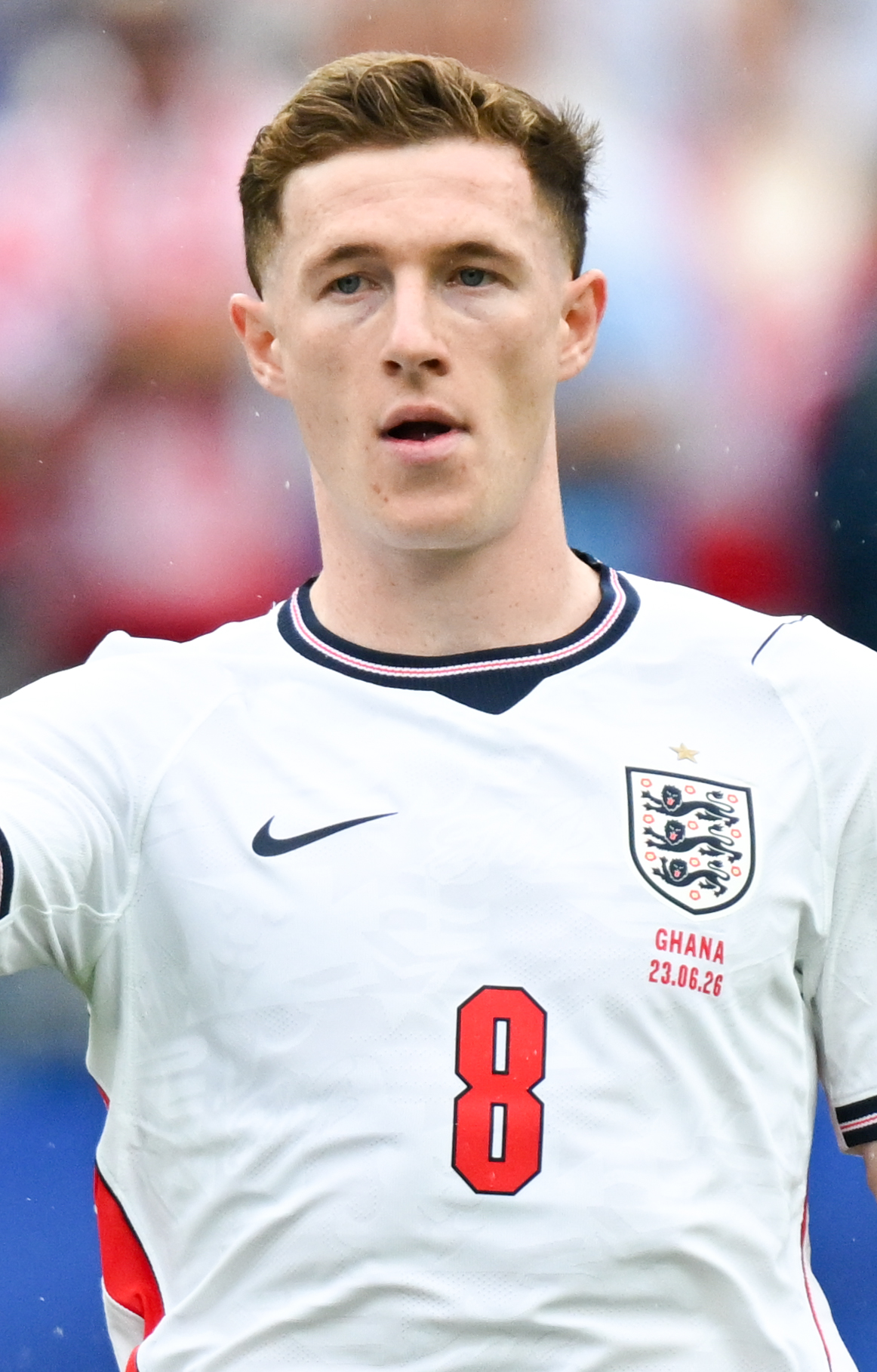
Anderson playing for England at the 2026 FIFA World Cup

Anderson received a first senior England call-up by England manager Thomas Tuchel on 29 August 2025, for 2026 FIFA World Cup qualifiers against Andorra and Serbia. He made his England debut on 6 September in a 2–0 win against Andorra.

In May 2026, Anderson was selected in England's squad for the 2026 FIFA World Cup in which he helped England reach the semi-finals and win the bronze medal.

== Career statistics ==
=== Club ===
As of match played 21 November 2026

Appearances and goals by club, season and competition
Club	Season	League			FA Cup		EFL Cup		Europe		Other		Total	
Club	Season	Division	Apps	Goals	Apps	Goals	Apps	Goals	Apps	Goals	Apps	Goals	Apps	Goals
Newcastle United	2020–21	Premier League	1	0	1	0	0	0	—		—		2	0
Newcastle United	2021–22	Premier League	0	0	0	0	0	0	—		—		0	0
Newcastle United	2022–23	Premier League	22	0	1	0	4	0	—		—		27	0
Newcastle United	2023–24	Premier League	21	0	2	0	1	0	2 (Note: Appearances in UEFA Champions League)	0	—		26	0
Newcastle United	Total		44	0	4	0	5	0	2	0	—		55	0
Bristol Rovers (loan)	2021–22	League Two	21	7	—		—		—		—		21	7
Nottingham Forest	2024–25	Premier League	37	2	4	0	1	0	—		—		42	2
Nottingham Forest	2025–26	Premier League	38	4	0	0	0	0	12 (Note: Appearances in UEFA Europa League)	0	—		50	4
Nottingham Forest	Total		75	6	4	0	1	0	12	0	—		92	6
Manchester City	2026–27	Premier League	11	1	0	0	0	0	4	1	1 (Note: Appearance in FA Community Shield)	0	16	2
Career total			151	14	8	0	6	0	18	1	1	0	184	15

=== International ===
As of match played 15 November 2026

Appearances and goals by national team and year
National team	Year	Apps	Goals
England	2025	6	0
England	2026	17	0
Total		23	0

== Honours ==
Bristol Rovers

- EFL League Two third-place promotion: 2021–22

Newcastle United

- EFL Cup runner-up: 2022–23

England U21

- UEFA European Under-21 Championship: 2025

England

- FIFA World Cup third place: 2026

Individual

- EFL League Two Goal of the Month: March 2022
- EFL Young Player of the Month: April 2022
- EFL League Two Player of the Month: April 2022
- UEFA European Under-21 Championship Team of the Tournament: 2025
