= Collywell Bay Branch Line =

Collywell Bay Branch Line was to have been an electric branch railway line in North East England from Monkseaton station to a planned station at Collywell Bay (to serve the proposed housing estate there), with one intermediate station at Brierdene. The branch line was constructed between 1913 and 1914.
