= Widening participation =

Policy to improve access and success in higher education

Widening participation (WP) in higher education is a policy approach intended to increase access to higher education for groups that are under-represented, disadvantaged, or otherwise less likely to enter, continue in, or complete higher education. It is closely related to terms such as widening access, equity of access, access and participation, and college access and success.

Widening participation policies may seek to address inequalities linked to socioeconomic status, disability, ethnicity, geography, age, prior educational opportunity, care experience, family background, or membership of groups historically under-represented in higher education. In many systems, the focus has moved beyond entry to higher education to include student retention, attainment, completion and graduate outcomes.

== Policy approaches ==
Widening participation policies may include outreach to schools and communities, financial support, contextual admissions, bridging and foundation programmes, recognition of prior learning, flexible study routes, universal design, academic skills support, mentoring, and targeted student-success measures.

In England, the Office for Students describes access and participation plans as setting out how higher education providers will improve equality of opportunity for students from disadvantaged backgrounds to access, succeed in, and progress from higher education. This reflects a broader tendency in widening participation policy to consider the whole student lifecycle rather than only admission to higher education.

== By country ==
=== England ===
In England, widening participation became a major component of higher education policy in the late 1990s and 2000s. The UK government's Public Service Agreement target was to increase participation in higher education towards 50 per cent of those aged 18 to 30 by the academic year 2010–11.

The issue was also the subject of political controversy around university admissions, including the Laura Spence affair in 2000 and the University of Bristol admissions controversy in 2003. These disputes reflected wider debates about whether admissions systems should take account of educational disadvantage, school background and social context.

The Office for Students regulates access and participation in England. Universities and colleges registered in the "Approved (fee cap)" category and wishing to charge above the basic tuition fee cap must have an access and participation plan approved by the OfS. These plans identify risks to equality of opportunity, set out intervention strategies, explain how providers will evaluate their impact, and state the investment planned for access and participation work.

=== Ireland ===
In Ireland, widening participation policy is usually framed as equity of access, participation and success in higher education. The Higher Education Authority publishes the National Access Plan, a strategic action plan for equity of access, participation and success in higher education. The fourth National Access Plan covers the period 2022–2028.

The 2022–2028 National Access Plan identifies three main groups that are under-represented in Irish higher education: students who are socioeconomically disadvantaged, students who are members of Irish Traveller and Roma communities, and students with disabilities, including intellectual disabilities. The plan sets two overarching ambitions: that the higher education student body should reflect the diversity and social mix of Ireland's population, and that higher education institutions should be inclusive and universally designed environments supporting student success, outcomes, equity and diversity.

Ireland's access policy includes national targets, key performance indicators and qualitative indicators. In 2023, the Department of Further and Higher Education, Research, Innovation and Science stated that the National Access Plan included an additional investment of €35 million over seven years to increase participation in higher education among specific student groups.

=== Australia ===
In Australia, widening participation has been associated with equity policy for students from low socioeconomic status backgrounds, students from regional and remote areas, and Aboriginal and Torres Strait Islander students. The Higher Education Participation and Partnerships Program (HEPPP) operated from 2010 to 2025 and provided funding to eligible universities to implement strategies improving access to undergraduate courses for these groups.

HEPPP was discontinued on 1 January 2026, with most eligible activities supported instead through Needs-Based Funding and Outreach Funding programmes. The Australian Universities Accord final report highlighted continuing under-representation of disadvantaged groups, noting that Australians from low socioeconomic status backgrounds made up 25 per cent of the population but 17 per cent of undergraduate enrolments.

=== United States ===
In the United States, the term "widening participation" is less commonly used, but related policies are often described as college access, college opportunity, student success, or equity in postsecondary education. The Federal TRIO Programs are outreach and student services programmes designed to identify and support individuals from disadvantaged backgrounds. TRIO programmes serve low-income individuals, first-generation college students and individuals with disabilities, supporting progression from middle school to postbaccalaureate programmes.

== Evaluation and criticism ==
Widening participation policies have been criticised when they focus narrowly on entry rates without sufficient attention to completion, attainment, graduate outcomes, or the distribution of students across more selective institutions and programmes. Research in England using linked administrative data found that large raw gaps in higher education participation by socioeconomic status were substantially reduced after controlling for prior attainment, suggesting that earlier educational inequality is an important contributor to later participation gaps.

More recent commentary has argued that, despite increased access to higher education, students from disadvantaged backgrounds remain less likely to enter the most selective institutions and less likely to achieve strong outcomes after entry. Critics also argue that widening participation policies can become overly bureaucratic if institutions are required to produce plans and monitoring data without clear evidence of which interventions are effective.

Supporters of widening participation argue that selective admissions, prior educational inequality, financial barriers, geographical disadvantage and lack of information can all restrict educational opportunity. They also argue that widening participation should include student success and progression after entry, rather than only increasing the number of entrants from under-represented groups.

== See also ==
- Affirmative action
- Contextual admissions
- Educational inequality
- First-generation college students in the United States
- Higher education policy
- Recognition of prior learning
- Social mobility
- Universal design for learning
