= Collywell Bay railway station =

Former railway station in England

Collywell Bay

General information
- Location: Seaton Sluice; England
- Coordinates: 55.0789°N 1.4736°W
- Platforms: 2

Other information
- Status: Disused

History
- Original company: North Eastern Railway

Key dates
- 1914: Never Opened
Location

Collywell Bay was a railway station constructed in 1913–14 to serve a planned branch line terminating at Seaton Sluice. Although the line was built, the station did not open and the branch line was abandoned in 1931. The station was demolished in 1964 and remained in place despite never being opened. The station was to have been the terminus of the never opened Collywell Bay Branch Line, which, intending to promote Seaton Sluice as a resort, chose a more appealing name for their line and station.

== Services ==
Preceding station	National Rail	Following station
Terminus	North Eastern Railway; Collywell Bay Branch Line	Brierdene
