= Whitley Bay High School =

School in Tyne and Wear, England

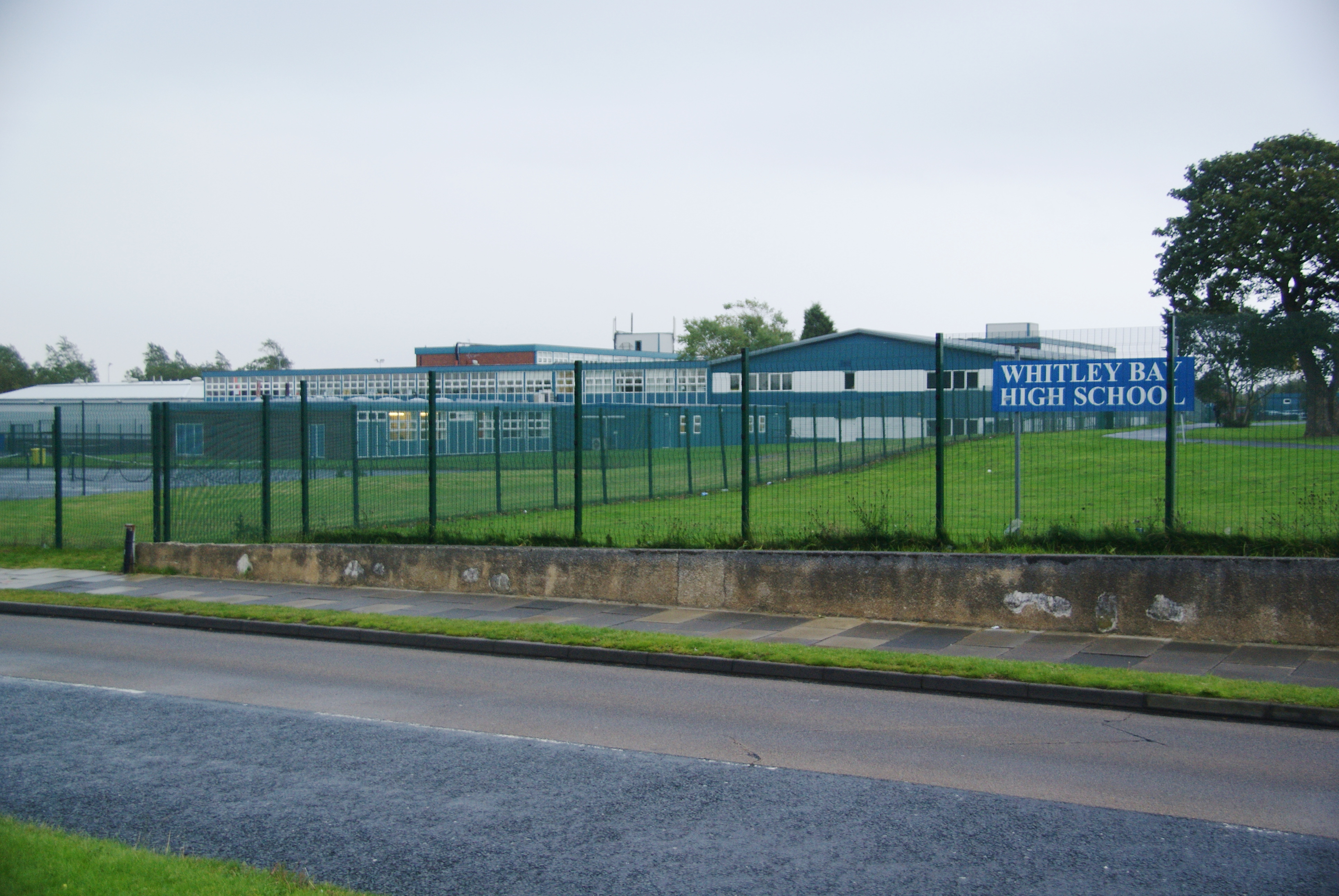
- Pictured in 2011

Location
- Deneholm; Monkseaton; Whitley Bay, Tyne and Wear, NE25 9AS; England; 55°02′53″N 1°27′57″W

Information
- Type: Foundation school
- Established: 1935
- Local authority: North Tyneside
- Department for Education URN: 108638 Tables
- Ofsted: Reports
- Chair of Governors: Paul Mitchell
- Headteacher: Steve Wilson
- Staff: approx. 180
- Gender: Mixed
- Age: 13 to 18
- Enrolment: 1,602
- Colours: Blue and White
- Website: http://www.whitleybayhighschool.org

Whitley Bay High School is a mixed upper school and sixth form located in Whitley Bay, North Tyneside, England.

== Admissions ==
The school has 1600 pupils; more than 600 are in the sixth form. In 2006, the school was awarded Specialist College Status in Science & Humanities.

It is situated next to Monkseaton Drive (A1148), towards the north of Monkseaton. There is a subway for access under the main road. It is in the parish of St Peter, Monkseaton.

== History ==
=== Grammar school ===
The school was originally built as a grammar school in 1963, and was originally known as Whitley Bay and Monkseaton Grammar School. The buildings were officially opened on 7 December 1963, by Edward Boyle, Baron Boyle of Handsworth. It was formerly housed in what is now the Marden Bridge Middle School. The original buildings on site were A Block, B Block and C Block.

=== Comprehensive ===
In 1973, it became a high school.

=== New Build ===
In May 2022, Whitley Bay High School started construction on two new buildings to house their school on the same site, but they have left partial amounts of the old C-block and D-block, as the asbestos was not disturbed there, and it is completely safe for use. The build took roughly as long as expected, and was opened by author Ann Cleeves OBE in September 2023 in a large ribbon cutting ceremony attended by elected Mayor of North Tyneside, Norma Redfearn however the demolition of the old buildings proved difficult, as asbestos was disturbed, meaning that the demolition had to proceed slower than normal, exceeding the projected target of 2024. As of November 2026, it is still under demolition.

== Feeder Schools ==
Whitley Bay High School typically feeds from middle schools in Whitley Bay and Monkseaton, mainly: Valley Gardens Middle School, Marden Bridge Middle School, Wellfield Middle School, and Monkseaton Coastal School (formerly Monkseaton Middle School. In total, each year group has approximately 400 pupils, with the vast majority coming from Valley Gardens Middle School. Split in a 16-form entry school, the class sizes are typically between 20 and 28.

== Buildings ==
- A-Block (Built 2024): English, Modern Foreign Languages (French, German, and Spanish), Science (predominantly Chemistry), Humanities (History, Geography, Religious Studies), IT and Computer Science, Business, the Sixth Form Common, a lecture hall, the main hall and various offices.
- B-Block: Temporary Classrooms
- C-Block: Biology, Textiles.
- D-Block (built 2003): Art, Drama, Music, Science (predominantly Physics), the School Library, a music recording studio and a drama studio.
- WBHS Sport Centre: Physical Education (The sports hall, two fitness studios, a limited gym, and offices.

== Former pupils ==
- Rudolf Abel, KGB spy, real name William Fisher
- Sam Fender, musician (attended sixth form)
- Lawrence Freedman, academic and historian, member of the Iraq Inquiry
- Peter Ramage, footballer
- WillNE, content creator, owner of Rodd's iced coffee, real name William Lenney
- Elliot Anderson, footballer
