= University of Bristol admissions controversy =

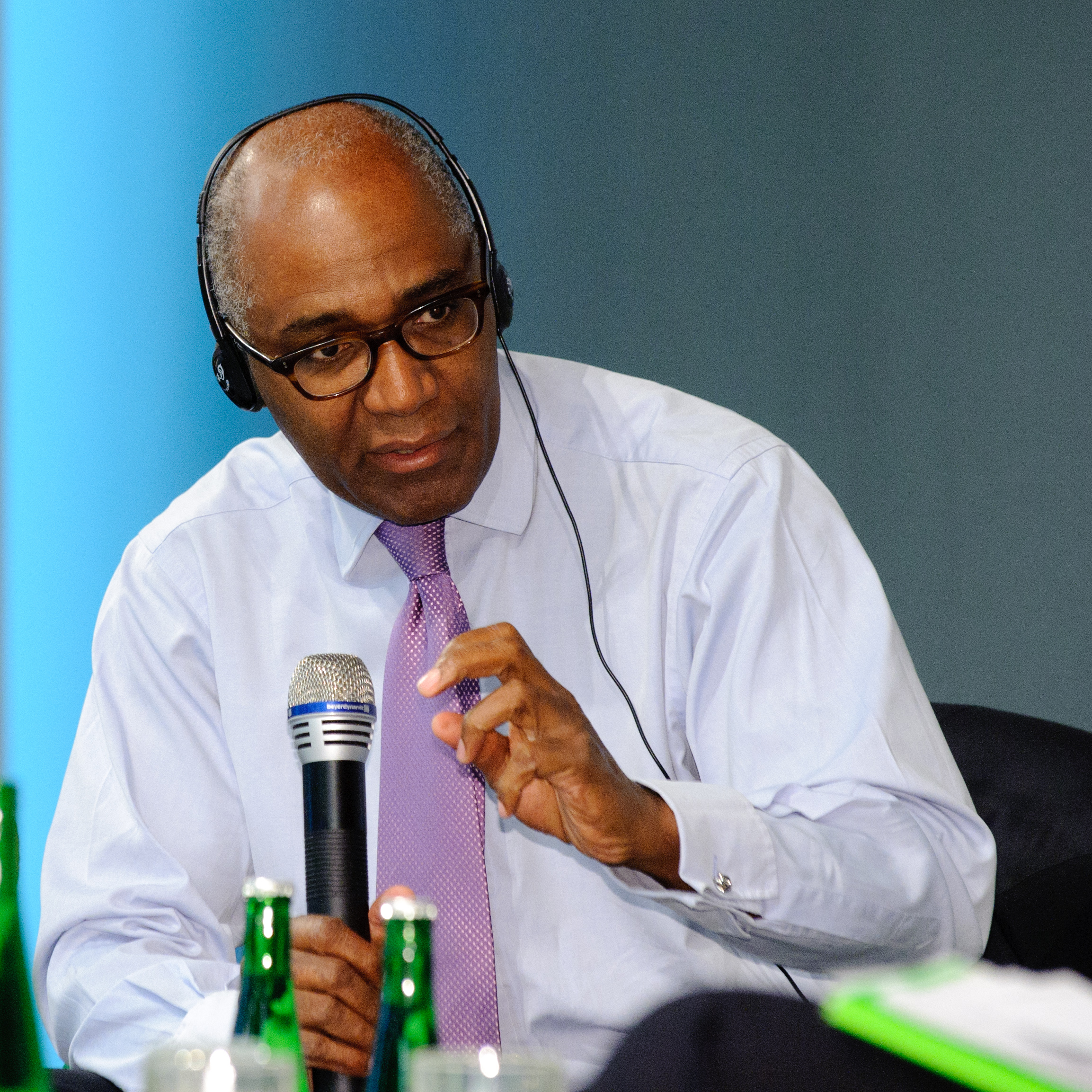
Then Commission for Racial Equality head Trevor Phillips criticised the rejection of his daughter who attended the independent Westminster School.

The University of Bristol admissions controversy refers to a historic dispute over the admissions process for the University of Bristol in the United Kingdom which occurred in 2003. The 2003 incident was caused by concerns over bias in the admissions system that were perceived as favouritism towards state school students (Note: In the United Kingdom a state school is a government funded school which provides education free of charge to pupils. In official literature they are known as maintained schools and include a wide variety of schools including faith based schools and grammar schools. All schools which are not state schools are independent schools. See State school.) after the rejection of some students with strong academic records who attended private schools. (Note: In the United Kingdom a public school refers to a privately funded school funded by the payment of tuition fees. The terms "private school", "public school" and "independent school" are used fairly interchangeably to refer to fee paying school which operate free of the state although "public school" is usually reserved for the leading fee charging independent schools. In the United States the term public school refers to government funded schools. See Public school.) The university's widening participation policy allowed the awarding of slightly lower offers to promising applicants from schools with lower academic achievement. Controversy surrounding this policy resulted in a brief boycott of the university by some independent schools and intense media debate about the fairness of the admissions policy as well as praise and criticism of the policy and the boycott from politicians, student leaders and education groups. The boycott was lifted after two months when the Independent School's Council expressed satisfaction with the fairness of the admissions system. Two years later a survey of independent schools concluded that: "It is likely that rejections which may have seemed discriminatory to parents and schools have in fact, been due to a large rise in suitably qualified applicants" and independent evidence was compiled suggesting that claims of bias were wildly exaggerated. The controversy has now been superseded by the reality that all British universities have active "widening participation" policies designed to increase university applications from lower-achieving schools which tend, de facto, to be state schools.

== Context ==
Widening participation is a government policy in the United Kingdom which attempts to widen access to higher education by increasing numbers of under-represented groups including ethnic minorities, disabled people and those from lower income families. Widening participation is a strategic aim of the Higher Education Funding Council for England, the body which allocates funding to universities. The Bristol admissions dispute is one of two policial controversies over widening participation that occurred during the 2000s. In 2000 the Laura Spence Affair involved the rejection of a state school student who applied to study medicine at Oxford University and resulted in similar debate about widening participation. Bristol University first introduced a widening participation scheme in 1999 after the Dearing Report, a report which gave recommendations to the government on the expansion and funding of the British higher education system. Bristol's policy was in part a result of this report as well as being a principled attempt by the university to attract applications from state schools, something Bristol has traditionally struggled to do.

The aims of the 1999 Participation Strategy were to:

- Increase applications from students from under-represented groups
- Put in place an admissions system to enable admissions tutors to identify and make offers to applicants from under-represented groups who have the potential to complete our programmes successfully, with the aim of increasing the number of entrants from such groups
- Ensure that students from under-represented groups are given the support they need to achieve the learning outcomes and feel comfortable at Bristol, and to encourage integration of students from all backgrounds.

The university's widening participation policy was reviewed in 2001 when a report called The Way Forward set out how the university could meet HEFCE participation targets. Under the access initiative each UCAS application (Note: In the United Kingdom, applicants apply to University through the Universities & Colleges Admissions Service. Offers to study may be awarded and these are either conditional on exam performance (e.g. an offer of AAA at A-level) or unconditional. If an applicant does not meet their offer then a University may reject an applicant. A University need not make the same level of offer to all applicants. See UCAS) to Bristol was examined centrally before being passed to University Departments. Applications from schools where the average A-level grades were less than CCC were "flagged-up" to alert tutors to disadvantage. Bristol's state intake increased from 49.3% in 1998 to 60% in 2003 under the scheme.

Bristol has been described as "one of the most competitive universities to get into". At the time of the controversy the university had the third highest private school intake (only Oxbridge was higher) with only 57% of students coming from state school backgrounds. This has led some to label it elitist. In 2003 it was reported that the university has 39,000 applicants for its 3,300 undergraduate places each year. In 2002 Bristol had 2,000 students were hunting 100 places in history, and 1,500 students of English chasing only 47 places, leading The Guardian to argue that many well qualified students would be disappointed.

== Boycott ==
Accusations of bias were first made in 2002 when the Headmasters' and Headmistresses' Conference stated that the admissions procedures for Bristol, Durham, London School of Economics, Manchester, UCL and Edinburgh should be examined for bias.

The boycott of the university was announced on 4 March 2003 by the Headmasters' and Headmistresses' Conference and the Girls' Schools Association who expressed concern that the admissions policy could lead to the "apparently arbitrary rejection of well-qualified candidates".

In a joint statement they said:

In these circumstances, we must send a clear message to Bristol. We cannot recommend to our colleagues that they should encourage young people to apply to Bristol until such time as the university can assure us that its procedures are fully documented, fair, objective, transparent and consistently applied.

However, as it is students who decide which Universities to apply to it was not possible for private schools to prevent their students from applying to Bristol, the "boycott" amounted to discouraging their students applying there. The Telegraph described an academic boycott of this kind as "unprecedented". Among the rejected candidates cited as evidence of bias was Rudi Singh a student at King Edward's School. Singh was rejected from Bristol yet accepted to the University of Cambridge. Four students with 10A*s at GCSE and 4 As at A-level were rejected. Two had attended Bedford School. One student, Mark Smith, gained 9 A*s at GCSE and was predicted 3 As at A-level yet had his application rejected. Sushila Phillips, a student at Westminster School, was rejected from Bristol despite gaining a mark of 296 out of 300 in AS level English. Phillips later stated that she did not believe that she had been rejected because she attended Westminster School and that it was important that Bristol had control over its admissions system.

== Reaction ==
=== University of Bristol ===
The university denied any discrimination in the admissions process but reserved the right to take the educational background of students into account when assessing their A-level grades. In a written response to the Independent Schools Council, Vice-Chancellor Eric Thomas stated that the university did not operate a quota system for students from any particular school or social background:

The university does not practice unfair discrimination, it [Bristol] does not operate quotas and it will continue to recruit exceptionally able students from all backgrounds through a selection process that is as fair and straightforward as we can make it. Pupils, not schools, make the decisions about which universities to apply to and we are confident that they will continue to want to study at Bristol.

The university highlighted the fact that it is one of the most popular in the country with over 39,000 students for 3,000 places in 2002. In History, English, Economics and Law competition is so fierce that over 30 students can be competing for one place. In English there were 47 places and 1500 applicants of whom 500 had a perfect A-level score of AAA at A2, meaning that many top candidates were rejected.

Eric Thomas also emphasised the work the university was doing to "reach out" beyond the middle-classes. In a BBC interview he stated:

a huge raft of initiatives have been implemented. Things like summer schools in which we bring students to the university during the summer to see it, we have relationships with local schools and further education colleges.

The University of Bristol stated that it is against any kind of discrimination in the admissions process and that the policy of making lower offers to exceptional students from state schools and disadvantaged backgrounds was not to satisfy the government or gain funding:

There is no question of the University attempting to widen participation in order to gain Government cash. Bristol agreed its widening participation strategy in 1998 - long before widening participation became part of Government policy. Work in this field is resource-intensive and funding from the Government helps to cover the costs. The University is not motivated by money but by the desire to recruit the best students and by the recognition that if it is to act fairly and avoid missing out on some of the most able people, it must have regard to factors in addition to predicted A-level grades.

Newspapers reported that the admissions controversy created tensions between state and private school pupils at the university. Gus Glover a candidate who lost that year's University of Bristol Union presidential election attributed his loss to supporting the admissions policy. However, residents of Wills Hall wrote letters to the newspaper defending the hall against accusations of classism.

=== Head teachers ===
The National Association of Head Teachers, a trade union which represents head teachers in the United Kingdom stated that the "HMC and GSA are guilty of gesture politics of the worst kind... They are merely shooting themselves in the foot by pursuing a boycott".

=== Media commentators ===
The Daily Express criticised the admissions policies in their headlines. The Daily Express stated "More students being turned down for being middle class".

The then-head of the Commission for Racial Equality Trevor Phillips expressed surprise that his daughter had been rejected. In The Times he stated "Though I have no disagreement with greater access, I would have hoped universities and the government would have a slightly more sophisticated policy than simply 'blacklisting' independent schools".

=== Politicians ===
Prime Minister Tony Blair commented on the controversy, stating that university should grant places on the basis of merit rather than class. He added that he wanted to see more working-class people in higher education but was forced to backtrack from comments made by Margaret Hodge which argued that Universities such as Bristol should be set formal targets for widening access.

Charles Clarke, then the Education Secretary, described independent school criticisms as "ill-informed brouhaha". He also stated that it would be inappropriate for government to become too involved in university admissions. The then Shadow Education Secretary Damian Green accused the government of trying to "fiddle admissions for political ends". Liberal Democrat MP Phil Willis said that "social engineering is coming ahead of merit and the development of talent."

Sir Howard Newby chief-executive of the Higher Education Funding Council for England (HEFCE), the university funding body argued that Bristol's admissions policies were fair and accused sections of the media of becoming involved in a "moral panic" over positive discrimination.

== Resolution ==
The controversy resulted in applications to Bristol falling for the first time in a decade in the 2004/05 admissions cycle. Application numbers fell by 5% although Bristol downplayed this attributing the decrease to random fluctuations in the level of applications. The boycott ended on 29 April 2003 when the chairman of the Headmasters' and Headmistresses' Conference expressed satisfaction with the admissions policy for Bristol. In response to the controversy the university introduced a new, more transparent admissions policy. In 2005, the Independent Schools Council published a report which cleared Bristol of bias. The report surveyed applications by 20,000 private school pupils and found that in 60 of 300 courses surveyed 98% of private school pupils were offered a place.

== Subsequent developments ==
Year	State intake (%)
2002/3	63.8
2003/4	65.2
2004/5	64.1
2005/6	65.1
2006/7	63.1
2007/8	61.5
2008/09	61.5
2009/10	60.9
2010/11	60.2
2011/12	59.9

In 2009 Bristol rejected giving a "head start" to applicants to disadvantaged backgrounds as part of a scheme proposed by Peter Mandelson. Statistics available from the Higher Education Statistics Agency published in 2008 show that Bristol's state intake stood at 63.1% a decrease from 65.1% the previous year. Data from 2009/2010 shows Bristol's intake from state schools and colleges to be 60.0% an identical figure to 2003 when the controversy over admissions occurred.

In 2012 the university introduced a points based admissions system whereby poorer students “will be given an automatic weighting to their total academic score”. During the 2012/13 admissions cycle all undergraduate courses used some form of contextual data but the university has refused to state exactly how their scoring system works.

In 2013 the head of the Headmasters' and Headmistresses' Conference Chris Ramsay said that independent schools could consider a repeat of the 2003 'boycott' if access agreements agreed by the Office for Fair Access led to systematic discrimination against applicants from independent schools.

“We can influence [universities’] behaviour by advising good students to go or not to go to them, and that’s obviously something that I suspect is very relevant to them...There was a period just under a decade ago where we in independent schools advised students not to apply to Bristol and they didn’t like that. It definitely had an impact. If in the end we felt that a university was systematically operating its admissions in a way which was disadvantaging the candidates for whom in the end we speak, we might say that.”
