= Wellfield Middle School =

School in Whitley Bay, Tyne and Wear, England

Coordinates: 55°02′28.6″N 1°29′30.4″W

Location
- Kielder Road; Whitley Bay, Tyne and Wear; England

Information
- Type: Community middle school
- Motto: We Care
- Local authority: North Tyneside
- Head of School: S Winter
- Enrolment: 360 (approx)
- Houses: Warkworth, Alnwick and Bamburgh
- Colour: Burgundy
- Website: http://www.wellfieldmiddleschool.org.uk/

Wellfield Middle School is located in Whitley Bay, North Tyneside, serving the areas of Wellfield, Earsdon and Monkseaton. In 2015 it had about 360 pupils on its roll from the ages of 9 up to 13.

== History ==
Prior to 1972, there was a primary school in Wellfield. With Northumberland's creation of a three-tier education system, the school was divided into a First School (South Wellfield First School) and a Middle school (originally called South Wellfield Middle School).

In 1993, South Wellfield Middle School and other schools were threatened with closure by North Tyneside Council with a view to reducing surplus places. After a campaign by staff, parents, and pupils to keep the school open, the school successfully applied in 1994 to become one of the few grant-maintained schools in North East England.

Following this success, the school changed its name in September 1994 to Wellfield Middle School (Grant-Maintained). When grant-maintained status was abolished, it became known simply as Wellfield Middle School.

== SATs ==
Pupils at Wellfield complete their KS2 SAT tests in Year 6. Wellfield, along with all other schools in England, have their results published on the DfES website.

	Reading test	Maths test	SPAG test	Writing TA
Level 4 and above	94%	97%	78%	81%
Level 5 and above	56%	49%	56%	27%

== Famous former pupils ==
- Laura Spence, the schoolgirl from Whitley Bay who became the centre of a major political row in 2000 when Chancellor of the Exchequer Gordon Brown criticised the decision made by Oxford University not to award her a place to study medicine.
