= Whitley Lodge =

- Location in Tyne and Wear
- Coordinates: 55.054°N 1.462°W
- OS grid reference: NZ34437342
- Sovereign state: United Kingdom
- Country: England
- District: Tyne and Wear

Whitley Lodge is an upmarket and desired area of Whitley Bay, in Tyne and Wear in North East England. It is located to the north of the town, and is a residential suburb built in the 1950s.

It consists of a housing estate, the Whitley Lodge Shopping Centre (classified as a District Centre in planning terms) and Whitley Lodge First School. The school is home to the Whitley Lodge Baptist Church which was established in 2007.

At the centre of Whitley Lodge is its shopping centre, which includes a unisex hair salon, snooker club, post office, estate agency, newsagent, soft play area, cafe, barber shop, fitness centre, Italian restaurant (Davanti), the Kittiwake pub, Contour Blinds (window blind, shutter, awning and curtain specialists) and a Tesco Express. The centre is also home to various takeaway establishments, including Tandoori Take Away (Indian takeaway), New Claremont (Chinese takeaway), Dimitri Takeaway, and a Fish and Chip Shop. Heading east bound, toward to the Briardene, is the sought after Tavern & Galley public house and restaurant, located adjacent to the privately tenanted, multi-storey apartment block, Nelson Mandela House.
