= Trafficators =

Semaphore turn signal

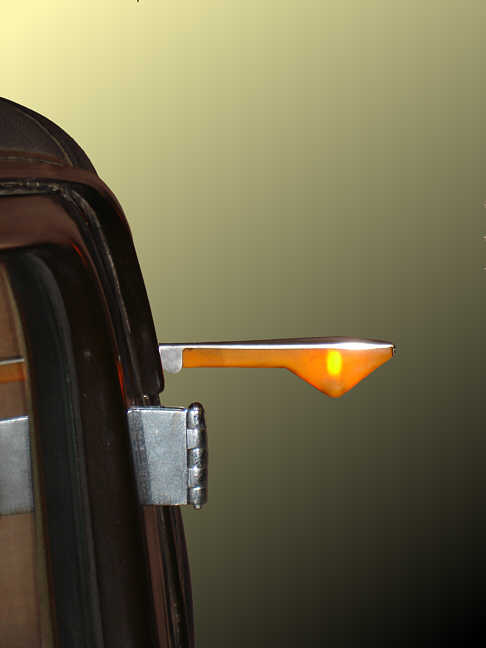
Trafficator in the "on" position

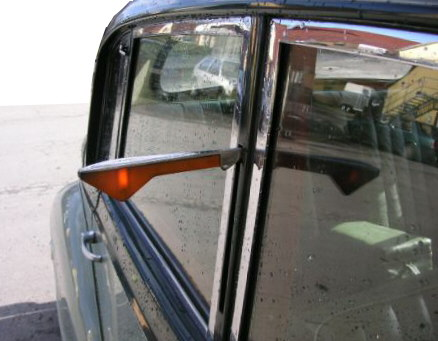
Trafficator in the "on" position

Trafficators are semaphore signals which, when operated, protrude from the bodywork of a motor vehicle to indicate its intention to turn in the direction indicated by the pointing signal. Trafficators are often located at the door pillar.

== History ==
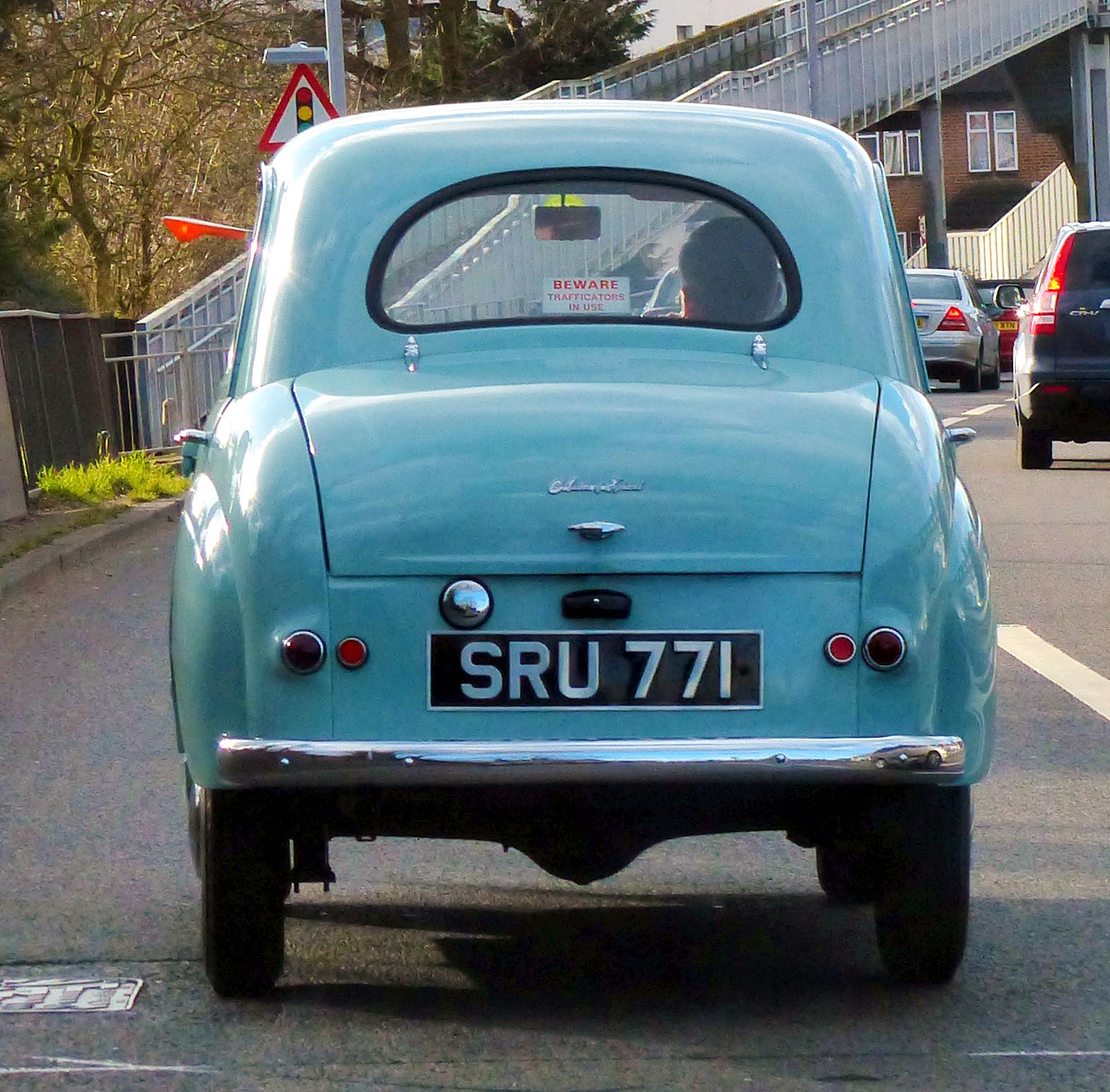
Austin A30 with trafficator deployed

They first appeared in the 1900s, when they were actuated either mechanically or pneumatically. In 1908, Alfredo Barrachini in Rome added electric lights inside the arms that turned on as they extended, but operation was still by a cable system. Electric operation came in 1918 when the Naillik Motor Signal Company of Boston added electric motor drive. This system was superseded by two French inventors, Gustave Deneef and Maurice Boisson, who used a linear solenoid in 1923. The final complete system came in 1927 when Berlin-based Max Ruhl and Ernst Neuman combined internal illumination and solenoid operation: (but see Gladstone Adams).

The shape of the trafficator arm is closely based upon the shape of the semaphore signal arm used by the Royal Bavarian State Railways beginning in 1890. The shape differs in that the trafficator has only the lower 'blade' of the rail signal's terminal 'arrowhead', so that the retracted trafficator sits flush with the vehicle's exterior.

They were common on vehicles until the introduction of the flashing amber, red or white indicators at or near the corners of the vehicle (and often along the sides as well), now referred to as "turn-signals". They have been increasingly rare since the 1950s, as ever-stricter legislation has prescribed the need for the modern type of flashing signal. Many historic vehicles (e.g. pre-1960 Volkswagen Beetle) that are used on today's roads have had their trafficators supplemented or replaced with modern indicators to aid visibility and to meet legislative requirements. In some countries trafficators may now be retro-fitted with flashing lights.
