= Wellfield =

- Location in Tyne and Wear
- Coordinates: 55.047°N 1.479°W
- OS grid reference: NZ334726
- Sovereign state: United Kingdom
- Country: England
- District: Tyne and Wear

Wellfield and South Wellfield is a village in Whitley Bay, England, between Monkseaton and Earsdon. It is a residential suburb built between the 1920s and 1950s. The older properties are towards Earsdon, the newer ones closer to Monkseaton.

The older, South Wellfield end, had, until relatively recently, a post office, a co-operative store, and a hairdresser's shop, but all are now closed and converted into private dwelling houses. The old Post Office is still identified on local A-Z maps. What is probably the oldest house on the estate stands on the corner of Monkseaton Road, near the junction with Hesleyside Road, its sunken garden being marked as a small quarry in the 1895 "Earsdon, Shiremoor and Backworth" Ordnance Survey map.

There is a newsagents, local shop and tanning salon in the centre alongside a children's park. Wellfield is a quiet residential estate with excellent first and secondary schools, including Wellfield Middle School and South Wellfield First School.
