= John Coxon (footballer) =

English footballer

Personal information
- Full name: John Coxon
- Date of birth: 7 April 1922
- Place of birth: Whitley Bay, England
- Date of death: May 1998 (aged 76)
- Place of death: North Tyneside, England
- Position: Full back

Senior career*
Years	Team	Apps	(Gls)
- Old Hartley
19??–1948	Darlington	1	(0)
- * Club domestic league appearances and goals

John Coxon (7 April 1922 – May 1998) was an English amateur footballer who played as a full back in the Football League for Darlington.

Coxon was born in Whitley Bay, which was then in Northumberland. He played football for non-league club Old Hartley, and by March 1946 had joined Darlington; he appeared twice in the wartime third-tier competition. He remained with the club until at least 1948, but made only one appearance in the Third Division North, in the 1946–47 season. He died in May 1998 in North Tyneside, Tyne and Wear.
