= Brierdene railway station =

Unbuilt railway station in England

Brierdene

General information
- Location: England
- Coordinates: 55.0633°N 1.4684°W
- Platforms: 2

Other information
- Status: Disused

History
- Original company: North Eastern Railway

Key dates
- 1914: Never Opened
Location

Brierdene was intended to be a railway station on the Collywell Bay Branch Line, with construction began in 1913. However, the project was abandoned in 1914 before its completion. The station was planned to have two platforms and served by the North Eastern Railway.

Preceding station	National Rail	Following station
Collywell Bay	North Eastern Railway; Collywell Bay Branch Line	Monkseaton
