= Laura Spence affair =

British university admission controversy

The Laura Spence affair was a British political controversy in 2000, ignited after the failure of state school pupil Laura Spence to secure a place at the University of Oxford.

== Background ==
Laura Spence was a pupil at Monkseaton High School, a state school in Whitley Bay, North Tyneside. In 1999, she applied for a place to read medicine at Magdalen College, Oxford. (There were 100 students in her school year, but she was the only one to apply for Oxbridge.) Spence had taken ten GCSEs, obtaining the top A* grade in each, and had been predicted (and later achieved) top A-level grades in chemistry, biology, English, and geography. After her interview at Magdalen College she was judged to be “outstandingly intelligent, but lacked confidence as with other comprehensive school pupils” according to notes made by one of her interviewers, Dr Ajit Lalvani. She subsequently was not offered a place to study at Oxford University. The same report said that Spence was one of ten British students to be awarded a $65,000 scholarship by Harvard University, where she later on studied biochemistry.

== Political row ==
A political row broke out after Labour MP and then Chancellor of the Exchequer Gordon Brown (who later became Prime Minister) commented on the decision at a Trades Union Congress reception. Brown accused the University of Oxford of elitism, saying that Spence's rejection was an "absolute scandal" and that he believed she had been discriminated against by "an old establishment interview system". Spence's headteacher, Paul Kelley, also said he believed Oxford was "missing out" and that he thought that Spence had been rejected because of her being from the north east of England. The University of Oxford rebutted all allegations of discrimination. The BBC reported that Magdalen College had offered only five places to study medicine but had received twenty-two applicants, and that Oxford received a similar number of applications from state schools and private schools in the north east of England, and accepted a similar proportion from each. The admissions tutor at Magdalen, Andrew Hobson, also denied the claims, pointing out that he was from Newcastle. Colin Lucas, Vice-Chancellor of Oxford, said that Brown's remarks were "disappointing", and an unnamed Conservative spokesman reportedly told the BBC: "This is ignorant prejudice. Why doesn't Gordon Brown get on with delivering at least some of the things Labour were elected on, rather than telling universities which candidates they should pick for which courses, when he can't possibly know the full facts?"

In the ensuing debate, those who disagreed with the Chancellor advanced a range of arguments: some believed there was no discrimination; some felt Brown did not have his facts straight and therefore should not have offered a public opinion; and some believed that Oxford was correct in not offering Laura Spence a place. When the issue was raised at an Oxford edition of the BBC's political discussion show Question Time in October 2000, Professor Robert Winston controversially said that Spence did not deserve a place, because "you have to be committed to the course, and Laura Spence clearly wasn't committed because she didn't even end up studying medicine." (Harvard, along with most other universities in the US, does not offer medicine as an undergraduate degree. Spence later went on to study medicine at the University of Cambridge as a postgraduate.)

Spence herself did not get involved in the arguments, subsequently saying that she tried to ignore the row by focusing on revision and not watching television for a week. In a House of Lords debate on higher education on 15 June 2000, Roy Jenkins, a Liberal Democratic peer and then Chancellor of Oxford University, criticised Brown for his comments on student admissions, saying that "nearly every fact he used was false", and that Brown's speech on Spence had been a "little Blitzkrieg in being an act of sudden unprovoked aggression", but "The target was singularly ill-chosen." Conservative peer Baroness Young stated that it was "an ultimate disgrace to use a young girl, a sixth former, in this way".

== After the row ==
The Laura Spence affair recurred in the headlines in the UK throughout the summer of 2000 (both before and after Brown's speech) and is arguably one of the major events that pushed "widening participation" in higher education into the political spotlight in the United Kingdom. It also caused a party political row over a select committee report on higher education.

Spence completed her studies at Harvard in 2004, and planned to return to the UK to pursue a medical career. She also encouraged more British students to study in the US, citing the "broader, more balanced curriculum" of a liberal arts education and the availability of scholarships and need-based financial aid to assist with fees that may seem "astronomically prohibitive". It was later reported that she was studying medicine at the University of Cambridge.

In 2007 The Sunday Times revisited the affair, comprehensively reviewing the political statements at the time set against the facts of the case, and subsequent political and educational fall-out. It was highly critical of Gordon Brown's "spectacular own goal".

On 25 October 2008, Spence graduated from Wolfson College, Cambridge, with a degree in medicine with distinction.

== See also ==
- Gina Grant college admissions controversy
- University of Bristol admissions controversy
