= Monkseaton High School =

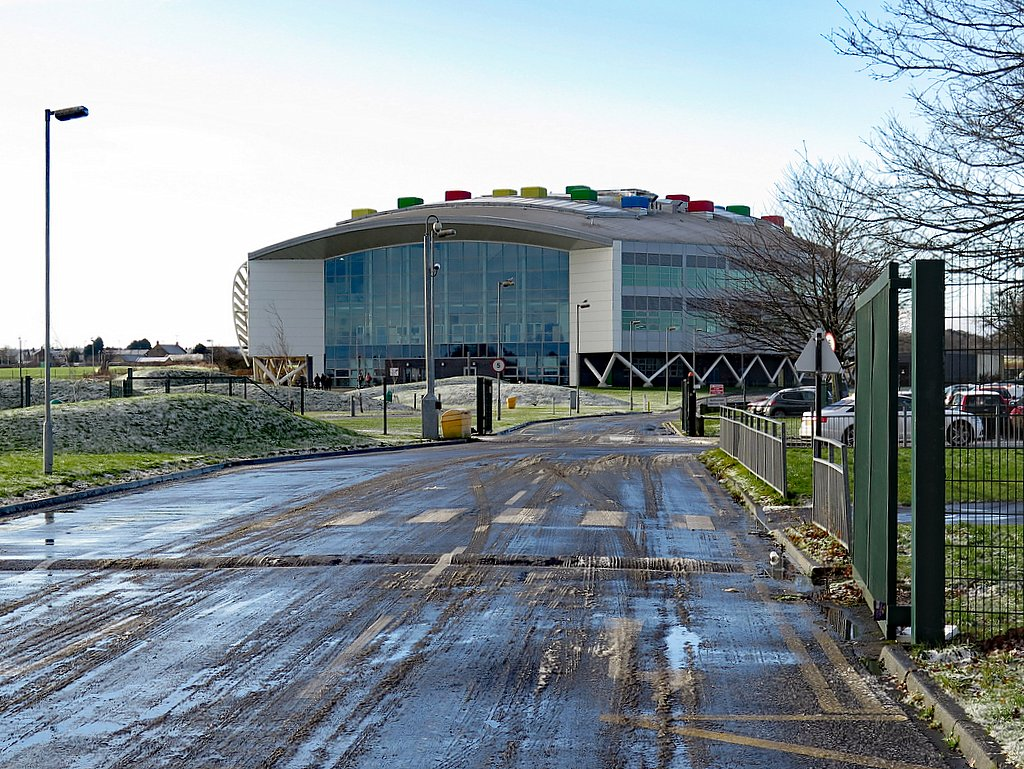

Location
- Seatonville Road; Whitley Bay, Tyne & Wear, NE25 9EQ; England; 55°01′53″N 1°27′51″W

Information
- Type: Foundation School
- Local authority: North Tyneside
- Trust: North Tyneside Learning Trust
- Department for Education URN: 108642 Tables
- Ofsted: Reports
- Chair of Governors: Anne Welsh
- Gender: Coeducational
- Age: 13 to 18
- Enrollment: 511 (2024)
- Capacity: 964
- Website: http://www.monkseaton.org.uk

Monkseaton High School was a coeducational upper school situated in Whitley Bay, North Tyneside, England for 13- to 18-year-olds. There are 465 students on roll, over 150 of whom are in the sixth form. The school has initiated or led a number of local and national initiatives aimed at raising standards and promoting LGBT equality.

Monkseaton High School is noted for its innovations in degree study in schools and primary modern languages.

Originally based on a dRMM design for the ideal school, the design of the school building has evolved into a building which is of a revolutionary design in terms of other secondary education buildings. The design, beyond the formal teaching spaces, incorporates a number of learning areas for students to study independent of teachers including computing. The light, airy feeling created throughout the school encourages 'open' learning and is a move away from traditional, 'institutional' school design.

The ellipse shape of the school is very efficient in terms of space and land usage. It is aerodynamic and due to its position, reduces seasonal heating and cooling impact. On the exterior Devereux Architects, the architectural practice behind the Exemplar school, has strategically installed solar panels to provide tempered hot water. The school also benefits from natural ventilation, known as E-stack, which controls and maintains a temperate climate within the building. External shades control the impact of the sun on the building and spaces within. The project was led by Devereux Architects and involved the services of Parsons Brinckerhoff, Shepherd Construction Ltd. and Hacel.

More recently in 2019 Monkseaton High School, under the leadership of head Jo Suddes, has found the school to be grade 2 'Good', whereas it was previously grade 1 'Outstanding'. The school was previously shortlisted for the 'Secondary School of the Year' award within the 2016 TES Awards.

In December 2024, the school announced it would close by August 2026 due to low pupil numbers, despite opposition from parents. The school was officially closed by GCSE results day on the 20th of August 2026 with a all of the Year 9s and Year 10s from the 2025-26 academic year being transferred to Whitley Bay High School and the building being left abandoned with all of the equipment still inside till it's scheduled for demolition.

== The Laura Spence Affair ==
In 2000, Monkseaton High School became a focus for the national media during the Laura Spence Affair. This was a major political argument about elitism in University of Oxford admissions procedures, centring on Magdalen College's decision to reject Monkseaton student Laura Spence's application to study medicine. Spence had been accepted by every other university she applied to, including Harvard University, where she was offered a £65,000 scholarship. She became an Academic All Ivy at Harvard and returned to the UK to continue her studies in medicine at Cambridge after completing her bachelor's degree at Harvard.

== All England Cup victories in 2006, 2007 and 2008 ==
In 2006, Monkseaton High School football academy won the All England Cup, a competition involving 2,836 sixth form teams across England. Monkseaton won the cup alongside the League Cup DIV1, League Cup DIV2, County Cup, North England Cup and Churchill Cup, playing 33 games, winning 32 and drawing 1 on the first game of the season – and beating London Academy 2-1 at the Meadow Lane. In 2007, Monkseaton once again won the cup, defeating Millfield 4–0. Accounts of the approach to football at Monkseaton appeared in The Sunday Times. In 2008, the school won the cup again beating Gateshead College 1–0.

== Secular school proposal ==
In 2007, headmaster Paul Kelley (who stood down in February 2012) proposed that Monkseaton High School become the first secular state school in the country. This would imply omitting the daily act of worship, which he felt was inappropriate at a school. Kelley said that the proposal, made during the latter days of the Blair premiership, was rejected as "politically impossible".

== Trust School ==
Monkseaton became England's first Trust School in August 2007. The partners in the Trust are the school itself, Microsoft, Tribal Education, North Tyneside Council and the Chair, Professor David Reynolds.

== Spaced Learning ==
Monkseaton has developed spaced learning, based on the neuroscientific discoveries of Douglas Fields at the National Institutes of Health in the USA. Spaced Learning is delivering learning in a pattern of three repetitions separated by 10-minute gaps that distract the learners from the subject, and has been reported widely in the media as "8 minute lessons". The school no longer practices the 8 minute lesson method, and has taken a much more structured and enriching learning method.
