= Gladstone Adams =

American photographer (1880–1966)

- Born: May 16, 1880; Newcastle upon Tyne, England
- Died: July 26, 1966 (aged 86)
- Occupations: photographer, inventor, executive
- Years active: 1908-1966

Captain Gladstone Adams (16 May 1880 – 26 July 1966) was a professional photographer, inventor and chairman of Whitley Bay Urban District Council, and is one of several people claimed to have invented the windscreen wiper (known in the United States as the windshield wiper).

== Early life and career ==
He was born in Newcastle upon Tyne, England, and attended Gosforth Academy. Adams served an apprenticeship in Tynemouth with photographer William Auty. He opened his own studio in 1904.

== Windscreen wiper ==
In April 1908, Adams drove to Crystal Palace Park in a 1904 Darracq-Charron motorcar to see Newcastle United play against Wolverhampton Wanderers in the FA Cup final. It was such a novelty to see a car in those days that it was put into a car showroom window while he was there, because so many people wanted to see it. On the way back from the cup final, snow kept getting on the windscreen and Gladstone had to keep getting out of the car to clear it. This experience led to his invention of a windscreen wiper. In April 1911, Gladstone patented his design for a windscreen wiper with Sloan & Lloyd Barnes, patent agents of Liverpool. Gladstone's version of the windscreen wiper was never manufactured, however. His original prototype can be seen in Newcastle's Discovery Museum.

== Military career ==
In World War I, Adams served in the Royal Flying Corps, the forerunner of the RAF, as a photograph reconnaissance officer. One of his duties was to prove the death and then arrange the burial of Baron Manfred von Richthofen, the 'Red Baron', after he had been shot down and killed. When World War II broke out, Adams was sixty years of age, too old for active service. However, he joined the Whitley Bay Air Training Corps, and a trophy given by him to the cadets is still awarded each year and bears his name, the Gladstone Adams Cup.

== Photography business ==
Gladstone was a professional photographer and he owned two studios, one in Barras Bridge in Newcastle and the other at 18 Station Road, Whitley Bay, which is still standing and is now a visualisation studio called PB Imaging. He was the first official photographer of Newcastle United.

== Chairman of Whitley Bay Urban District Council ==
As well as running a business, Adams was also a local Councillor, becoming Chairman of Whitley Bay Urban District Council. One of his official duties at that time was to attend the Duke of Northumberland's wedding in St. Margaret's, Westminster.

== Other inventions ==
Gladstone and his brother also invented the sliding rowing seat and the trafficator, the forerunner of the indicator.
