= Monkseaton =

Area of Whitley Bay, Tyne and Wear, England

Coordinates: 55.043°N 1.459°W

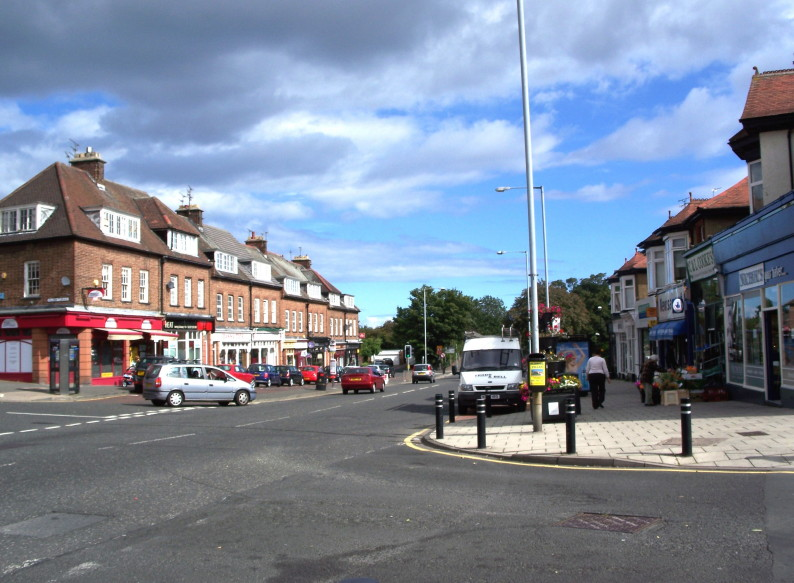
- Front Street

- Location within Tyne and Wear
- Population: 19,044 (2011.Wards)
- OS grid reference: NZ346722
- Metropolitan borough: North Tyneside
- Metropolitan county: Tyne and Wear
- Region: North East
- Country: England
- Sovereign state: United Kingdom
- Post town: WHITLEY BAY
- Postcode district: NE25
- Dialling code: 0191
- Police: Northumbria
- Fire: Tyne and Wear
- Ambulance: North East
- UK Parliament: Tynemouth

Monkseaton is an area of Whitley Bay, North Tyneside, in the county of Tyne and Wear, England. Historically in Northumberland, it is in the north-east of the borough, 3/4 mile (1.2 kilometres) from the North Sea coast and 1 1/2 mi (2.5 km) north of the River Tyne at North Shields. One mile (1.5 kilometres) to the north of Monkseaton, the extensive built-up areas of North Tyneside change abruptly into green belt stretching north into south-east Northumberland. It is at an elevation of 130 feet (40 m) above sea-level.

== History ==
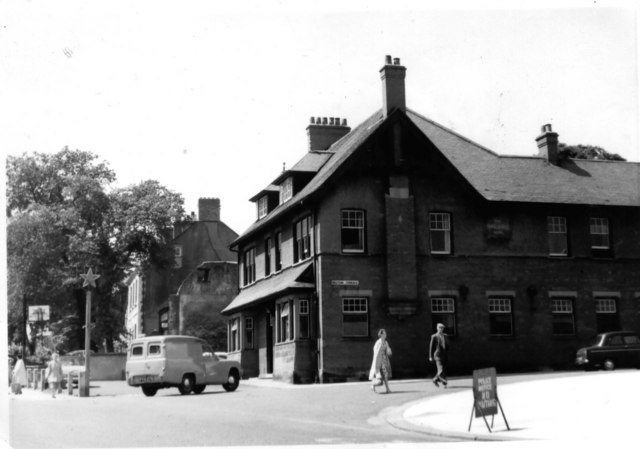
A photo of the Monkseaton Arms, a pub in Monkseaton, taken in 1970.

Monkseaton pre-dates the Tyneside coastal resort of Whitley Bay, originally recorded as land owned by the Priory of Tynemouth. The first documentary references to Monkseaton medieval village date from the early 12th century (c.1106–16) when Henry I granted Seton, later to be renamed Monkseaton, to Tynemouth Priory. It was a substantial village in the late 13th century, when Monkseaton Manor was one of ten manors of Tynemouth Priory, with fifteen bondsmen, ten cotmen and three freeholds listed in 1292.

The remains of a medieval brewery wall are still to be seen alongside the Monkseaton Arms public house.

In the Imperial Gazetteer of England and Wales of 1872, the population was recorded as 421 in 80 houses; this gave the village an area of 1,110 acres. It was described as having a large brewery and several collieries. Although Monkseaton has been subsumed in the urban developments of the 20th century, it still retains much of the character of the village it once was. It is a designated conservation area.

Monkseaton was formerly a township in the parish of Tynemouth, in 1866 Monkseaton became a separate civil parish, on 1 April 1913 the parish was abolished to form Whitley and Monkseaton. In 1911 the parish had a population of 2971.

On 30 April 1989, one person was killed and 14 others injured in a mass shooting known as the Monkseaton shootings.

On 28 June 2012, the village suffered flash flooding following torrential rainfall in the North East of England. Roads were closed causing traffic chaos, and many properties and buildings were flooded, including Langley First School which was closed for three weeks. The heavy rainfall made an embankment on the Tyne and Wear Metro line collapse, causing houses in Brantwood Avenue to be evacuated and West Monkseaton Metro station to be temporarily closed. Many residents suffered significant flood damage to their homes and possessions.

== Transport ==
Monkseaton is served by two stops on the circular Tyne and Wear Metro which connects it to Newcastle, both of which are on the former Blyth and Tyne Railway. Monkseaton station was moved to its current position in 1915 and the tennis courts in Souter Park South are now where the station was originally located. West Monkseaton station opened in 1933 and is a rare example of the Art Deco architectural style applied to a railway station in the United Kingdom.

Another rail route, heading north up the coast, is now disused and has been adapted into a footpath and cycle route leading to the A190 road that links Seaton Sluice to the town of Seaton Delaval.

== Facilities ==
Churchill Playing Fields are located within the vicinity and the North Tyneside International Youth Football Tournament takes place here every year. Bowling greens, tennis courts and a cricket pavilion accompany the park.

Monkseaton has three centrally located pubs situated close to each other on the north side of Front Street, the main thoroughfare of the village. Heading west from Monkseaton station, the first of these is the Monkseaton Arms, next is the Black Horse, and finally, set back from the street somewhat, is the Ship Inn. Two other pubs, the Hunting Lodge and the Beacon, are located west and north not far from West Monkseaton Metro station. There are several local schools, including Monkseaton Middle School, Valley Gardens Middle School, Monkseaton High School and Whitley Bay High School.

== Notable residents ==
- Ian La Frenais – comedic writer, of e.g. The Likely Lads
- Denise Welch – actress, dancer and television presenter
- Gladstone Adams – inventor and former chairman of Whitley Bay Urban District
- Enid Stamp-Taylor - actress (17, Percy Avenue, Whitley Bay)
- James Gibb (1918–2013) - British pianist, born here
- Will Lenney – YouTuber, grew up here
