= Whitley Bay =

Seaside town in Tyne and Wear, England

Coordinates: 55.0456°N 1.4443°W

- Town
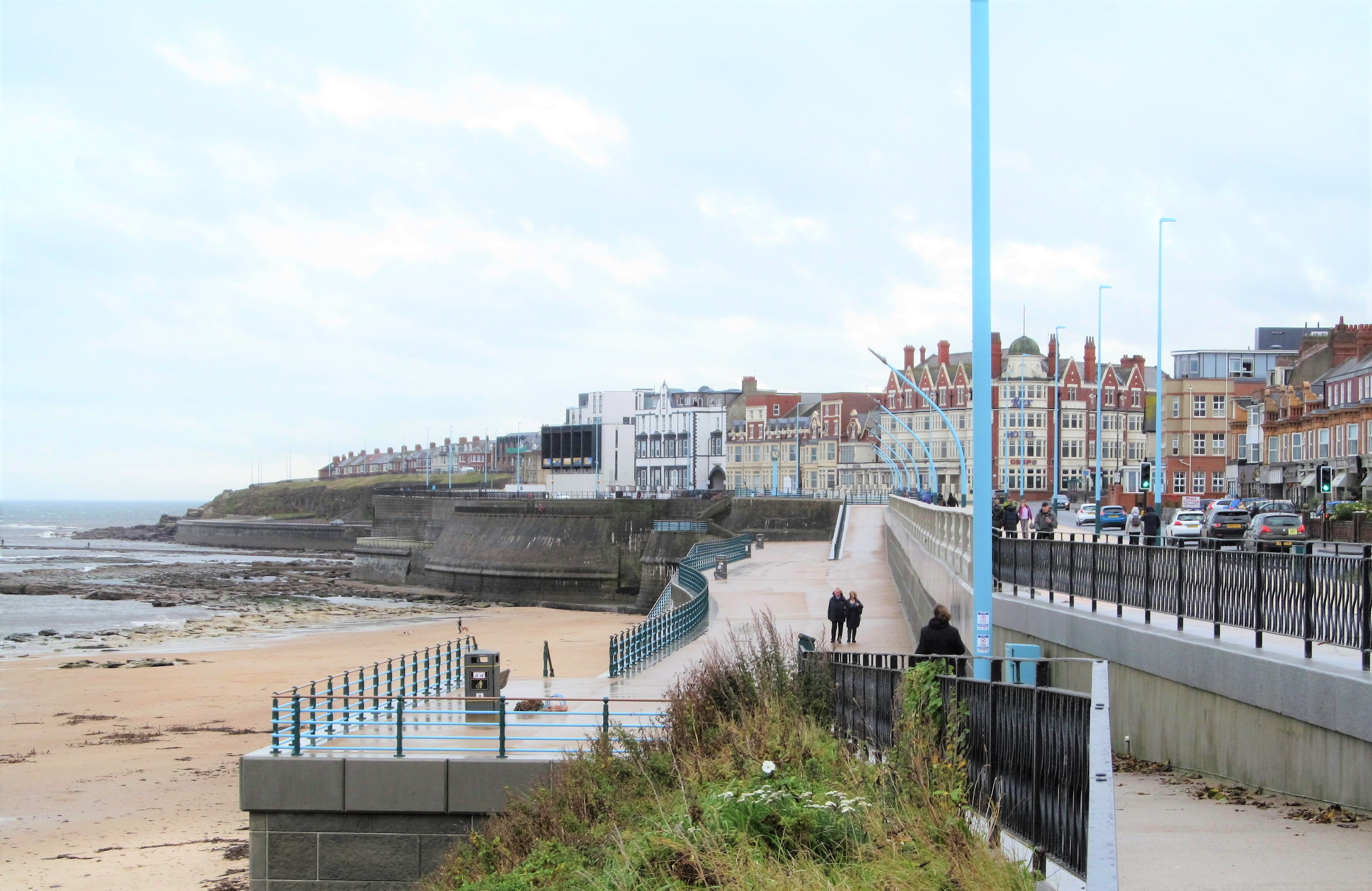
- Along the bay

- Location within Tyne and Wear
- Population: 36,880 (2021 census)
- OS grid reference: NZ3572
- Metropolitan borough: North Tyneside
- Metropolitan county: Tyne and Wear
- Region: North East
- Country: England
- Sovereign state: United Kingdom
- Places: List: Brierdene; Earsdon; Monkseaton; Wellfield; Whitley Lodge
- Post town: Whitley Bay
- Postcode district: NE25, NE26
- Dialling code: 0191
- Police: Northumbria
- Fire: Tyne and Wear
- Ambulance: North East
- UK Parliament: Tynemouth

Whitley Bay is a seaside town in the North Tyneside borough of Tyne and Wear, England. It was formerly governed as part of Northumberland and has been part of Tyne and Wear since 1974. It is part of the wider Tyneside built-up area, being around 10 miles (16 km) north-east of Newcastle upon Tyne city centre. The population of Whitley Bay at the 2021 census was 36,880.

Two notable landmarks are the Spanish City (a domed building on the seafront) and St Mary's Lighthouse, the latter on a small island near the town.

== History ==
=== Early history ===
Whitley was first mentioned around 1100 when King Henry I conferred it with other possessions on the Priory of Tynemouth; it was referred to in ancient documents and maps before that date as Witelei, Wyteley, Hwyteleg, Witelithe, Wheteley, Wytheleye, Whitlaw, Whitlathe and Whitlag. Whitley is also referred to in the charters of King Henry II, King Richard I and King John, confirming to the priors their possessions and liberties.

Whitley was connected with the Crusades when Pope Nicholas IV granted to Edward I the first-fruits and tenths of all ecclesiastical possessions for six years to defray the expenses of an expedition to the Holy Land. A valuation was made of the spiritual and temporal goods of the priory on 26 March 1292, when the yearly rents from Whitley were returned as 20 shillings, and the tithes as 9 marks.

About the beginning of the 14th century, the manor of Whitley was held from the prior of Tynemouth by a singular feudal service called the Conveyes which seems to have originated from John de Whitley. Richard de Emeldon, eighteen times Mayor of Newcastle and seven times its representative in Parliament, was the Lord of the manor of Whitley in 1333.

On 9 April 1345, Edward III granted Gilbert de Whitley a licence to crenellate his manor house at Whitley. To crenellate a house was to place battlements on it. Before this could be done, the sanction of the Crown was often sought. Although battlements were often largely symbolic, in this instance it is probably an indication of the degree of insecurity felt even this far south during the Edwardian wars with Scotland. The licence and crenellations were an indication of status. Only 2% of the small tower houses of the sort Gilbert built had licences. The 'sanction' of the crown was a sought-after bonus, but not a requirement.

After the dissolution of the monasteries, Whitley was held under the Crown for a time. By a grant of Edward VI dated 8 December 1551, it came into the hands of Dudley, Earl of Warwick who was created Duke of Northumberland. It remained in the Percy family until 1632 after which time the area appeared to be let at a yearly rental to various holders until it came into the possession of the Duke of Somerset on his marriage in 1682 with Elizabeth, the heiress of Joscelyn, the 11th Earl of Northumberland. Whitley subsequently passed by inheritance to her granddaughter Elizabeth Seymour who had married Sir Hugh Smithson, a Yorkshire baronet, afterwards created Duke of Northumberland. Whitley has since been retained by descendants and the present Duke of Northumberland is the Lord of the manor and principal landowner.

Monkseaton, which forms the greater part of the north west of the district, is also very old and its industries were common with those of Whitley being chiefly coalmining and limestone quarrying.

=== 19th century to present ===
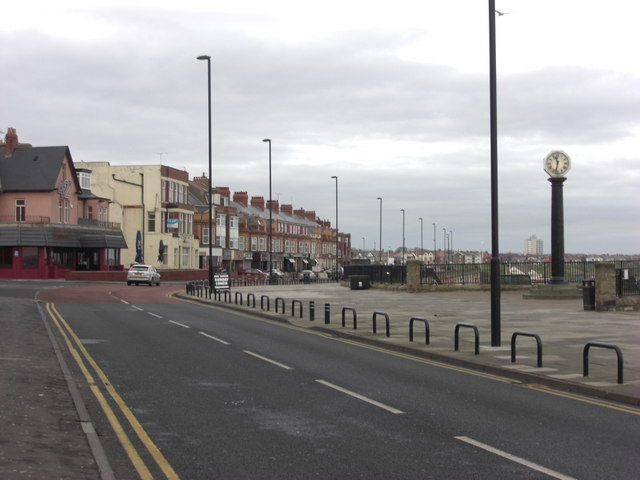
Whitley Bay Promenade

From the late 19th century and into the 20th century, the adverse effects of the decline of local coal mining and dependent industries in the area were ameliorated by the emergence of Whitley as a seaside holiday resort. The opening of the North Tyne Loop railway line in 1882, connecting the coastal villages to Newcastle, benefited the tourism industry. The line, now followed by the present Metro system, included a new railway station in the centre of the town, and another at Monkseaton. Both stations remain in use as Metro stations. Whitley Bay remains a popular holiday resort, with a caravan park operated by Parkdean Resorts for both holidaymakers and holiday home owners.

The parish church is St Paul's Church. It was provided by the Duke of Northumberland when the parish of Tynemouth was divided in 1860 and it was consecrated in 1864.

The Whitley and Monkseaton Local Board was established in 1873. The district of the local board became the urban district of Whitley and Monkseaton.

The town was known as Whitley until the 1890s, by which time confusion with Whitby, in North Yorkshire, regularly caused mail to be misdirected. The final straw came in September 1901 when a former resident died in Edinburgh and his body was to be buried in St Paul's churchyard, Whitley. Unfortunately, the body was mistakenly transported to Whitby, thereby delaying the funeral. When the council asked residents for suggestions of a new name, the most popular choice was Whitley Bay. Though since known officially as Whitley Bay, many residents still refer to the town as 'Whitley'.

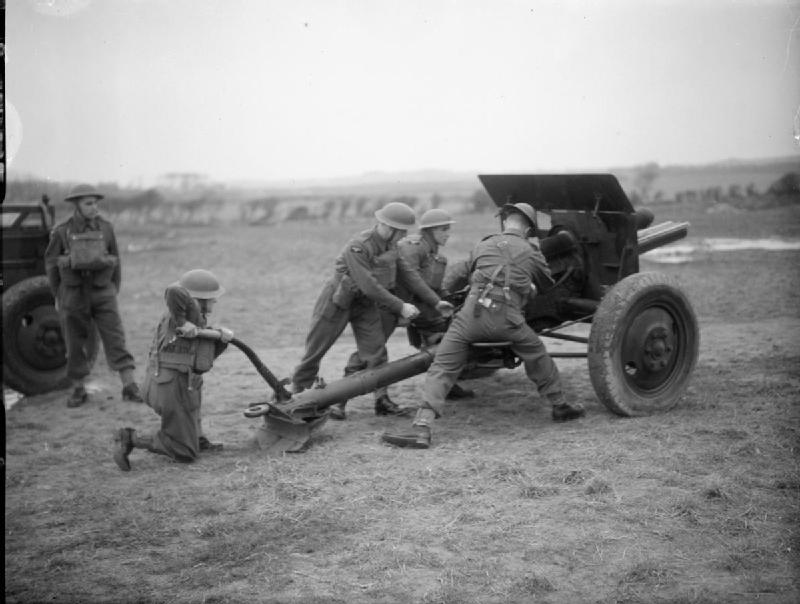
British airmen man a 75mm field gun during training at No. 2 RAF Regiment School, Whitley Bay

On 1 January 1944, the Whitley and Monkseaton Urban District became the Whitley Bay Urban District and on 5 March 1954 it was granted a Royal Charter of Incorporation as the Borough of Whitley Bay. The charter was presented by The Princess Royal at a ceremony in the town on 14 April 1954.

The Local Government Act 1972 abolished the borough, with Hartley in the north of the borough becoming a part of Blyth Valley district in Northumberland; the majority of the town, including Whitley Bay and Monkseaton, forming part of the Metropolitan Borough of North Tyneside in the Tyne and Wear area. The town is in the constituency of Tynemouth.

== Geography ==
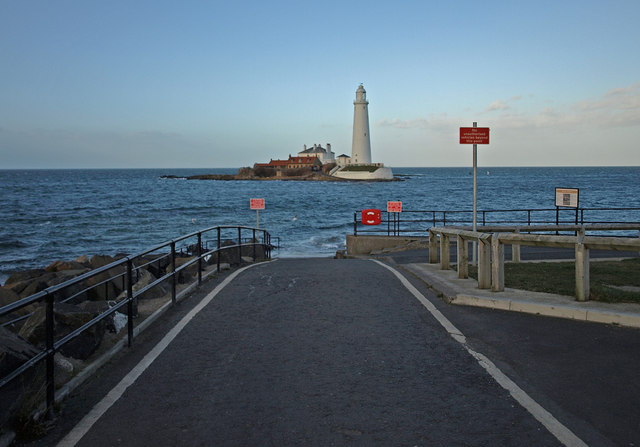
St Mary's Island Road leading to the tidal causeway

Whitley Bay is around 10 miles (16 km) east of Newcastle upon Tyne. It is bounded by the coastline of the North Sea to the east. Tynemouth is 3 miles south.

St Mary's Island, a tidal island at the northern tip of the town, is the site of a lighthouse, one of the town's landmarks. Coal seams are exposed in the cliffs next to the beach just North of St Mary's Island and it is possible to pick up coal from the beach at low tide. The coal seams in the cliffs extend all the way to Seaton Sluice.

== Transport ==
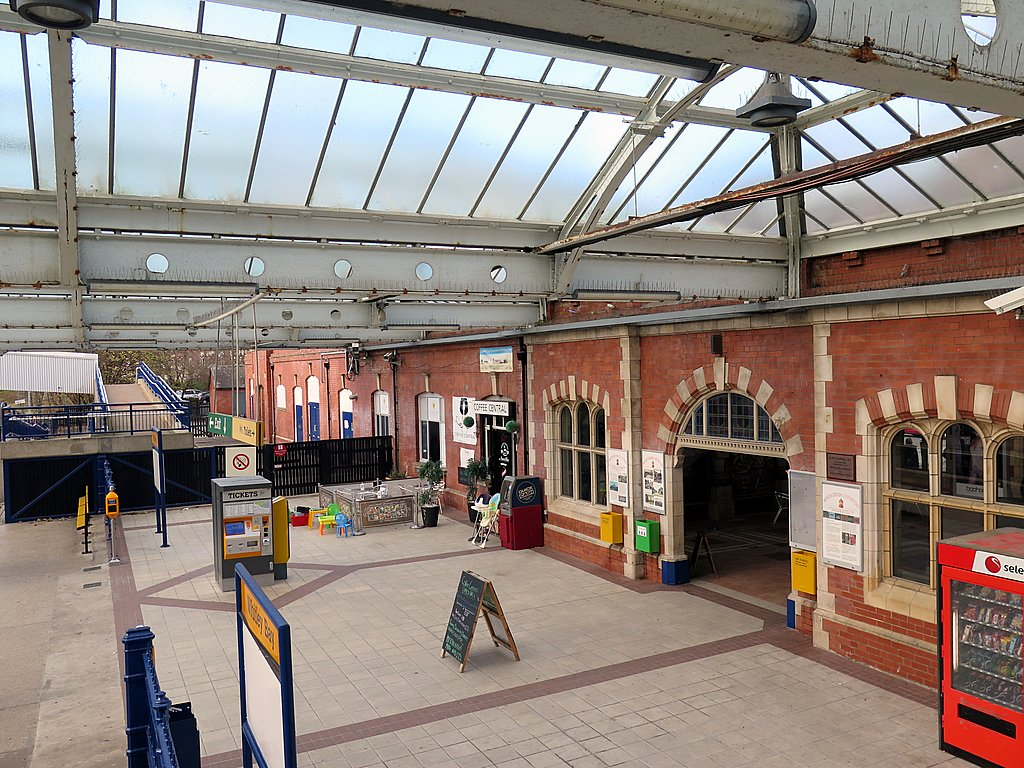
Whitley Bay station

The Tyne and Wear Metro Yellow line runs through the town with Whitley Bay, Monkseaton, West Monkseaton and Cullercoats stations serving the town. A Metro journey to Newcastle city centre takes around 25 minutes, via South Gosforth or Wallsend.

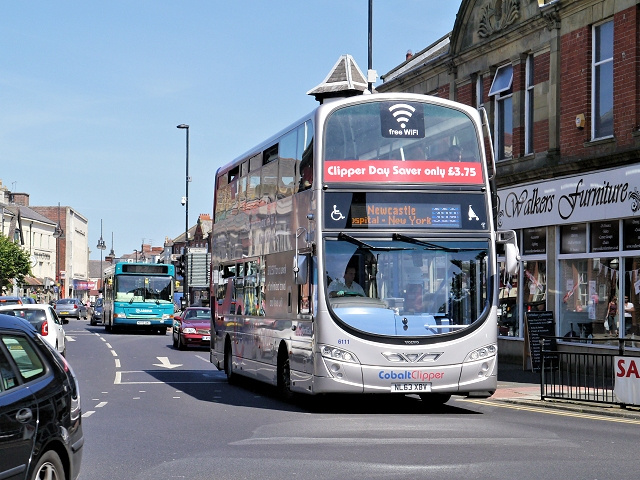
Buses on Whitley Road

The main bus operators in the town are Gateshead Central Taxis, Go North East and Arriva Northumbria.

Until the late 1990s, Arriva owned and operated a bus station and depot in the town. This closed in 1998; the Park View Shopping centre lies on the site of both this and the old post office building.

== Media ==
The local weekly newspaper, The News Guardian, is published by Johnston Press and printed on the presses of the Sunderland Echo in nearby Sunderland. The alternative free weekly paper is the Chronicle Extra, formerly known as the Herald and Post.

== Education ==
There is one high school in the town, Whitley Bay High School, after the closure of Monkseaton High School. The town is one of the few remaining in the UK that operates on a three-tier system, with first, middle and high schools, though this system is soon to be abolished for the more common two-tier system.

== Regeneration ==
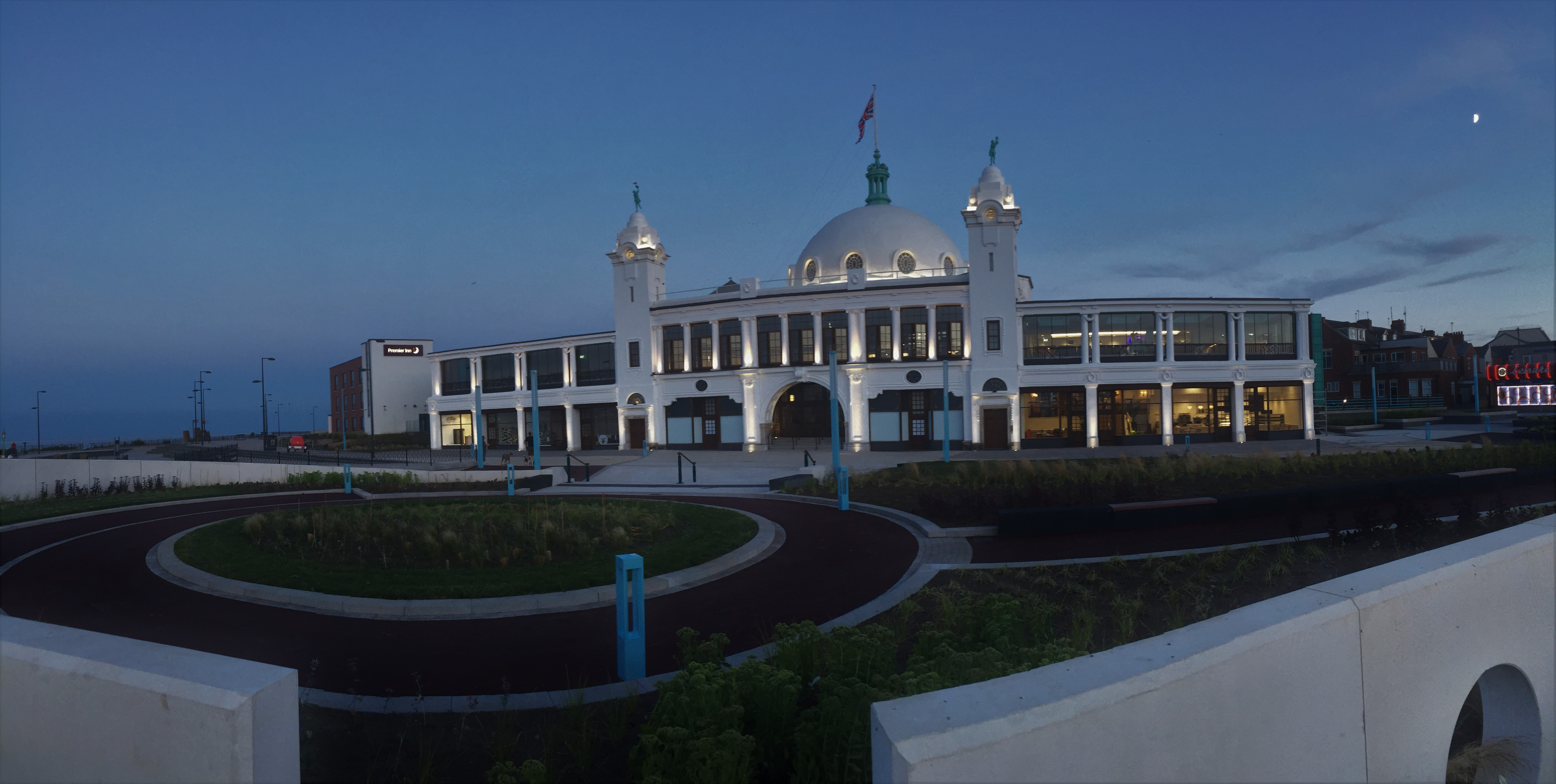
Whitley Bay Spanish City dome in 2018

In 2007–2008, a North Tyneside Council project to regenerate Whitley Bay centered on the redevelopment of the Spanish City, with its iconic dome, completed in 1912. For many years it was home to a theme park with rides and attractions, until falling into decay following the closure of the theme park in 2000.

Other civic improvements include a skatepark opened in the Panama Dip in 2008, a children's play park on Whitley Park in 2007, refurbishment of the swimming pool and the Playhouse both re-opened in 2009. A new library (behind the main street in the town centre) with a tourist information office, and joint service centre on the site of York Road was completed in 2013.

== Sport ==
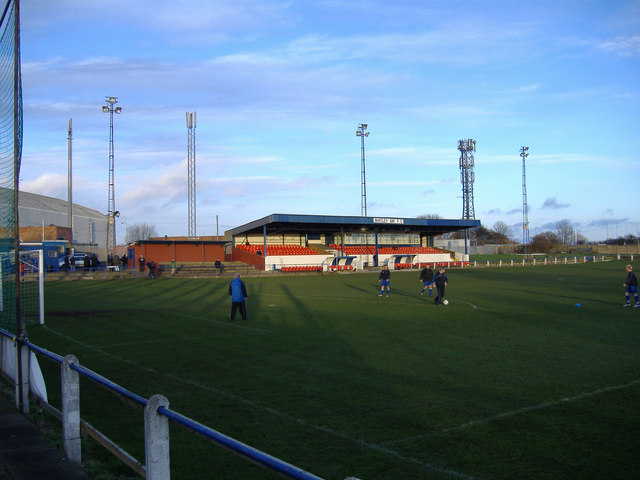
Hillheads Park, home of Whitley Bay F.C.

Whitley Bay F.C. play at the town's Hillheads Park, adjacent to the ice rink. The Hillheads stadium in the west of the town and holds approximately 4,500 spectators with 250 seats in the main stand. Now playing in the Northern League Division One, the club won the FA Vase (amateur FA Cup) in 2002, 2009, 2010 and 2011.

Whitley Bay Ice Rink is home of Whitley Warriors Ice Hockey Club. The team enjoyed success together with local rivals Durham Wasps at a national level during the 1980s and early 1990s.

Whitley Bay Rockcliff RFC play at the Lovaine Avenue ground in Hillheads. Founded in 1887 as Rockcliff RFC, and still generally known as "Rockcliff", they were originally based on the seafront in the Rockcliff area of the town, prior to moving along the seafront to the site later occupied by the Spanish City. In 1907 they moved to the present site in Lovaine Avenue. The years immediately after formation and up to the First World War were the most successful in the club's history, when they were one of the strongest sides in England, beating the world-famous Barbarians in 1892, and producing a number of international players including E.W "Little Billy" Taylor, who captained England in the 1890s. The introduction of the league structures in the late 1980s saw the club climb into the north east leagues in the early 1990s. The club now plays in the Durham and Northumberland Division 2.

The Rockcliff ground was the home of the short-lived dirt track racing, or speedway, venture in the spring of 1929. The first venue on Tyneside, it was not as popular as the sister track at Gosforth Stadium which opened early summer and was closed after only two months, when the operator Tyneside Speedways Ltd went into liquidation.

== Religion ==
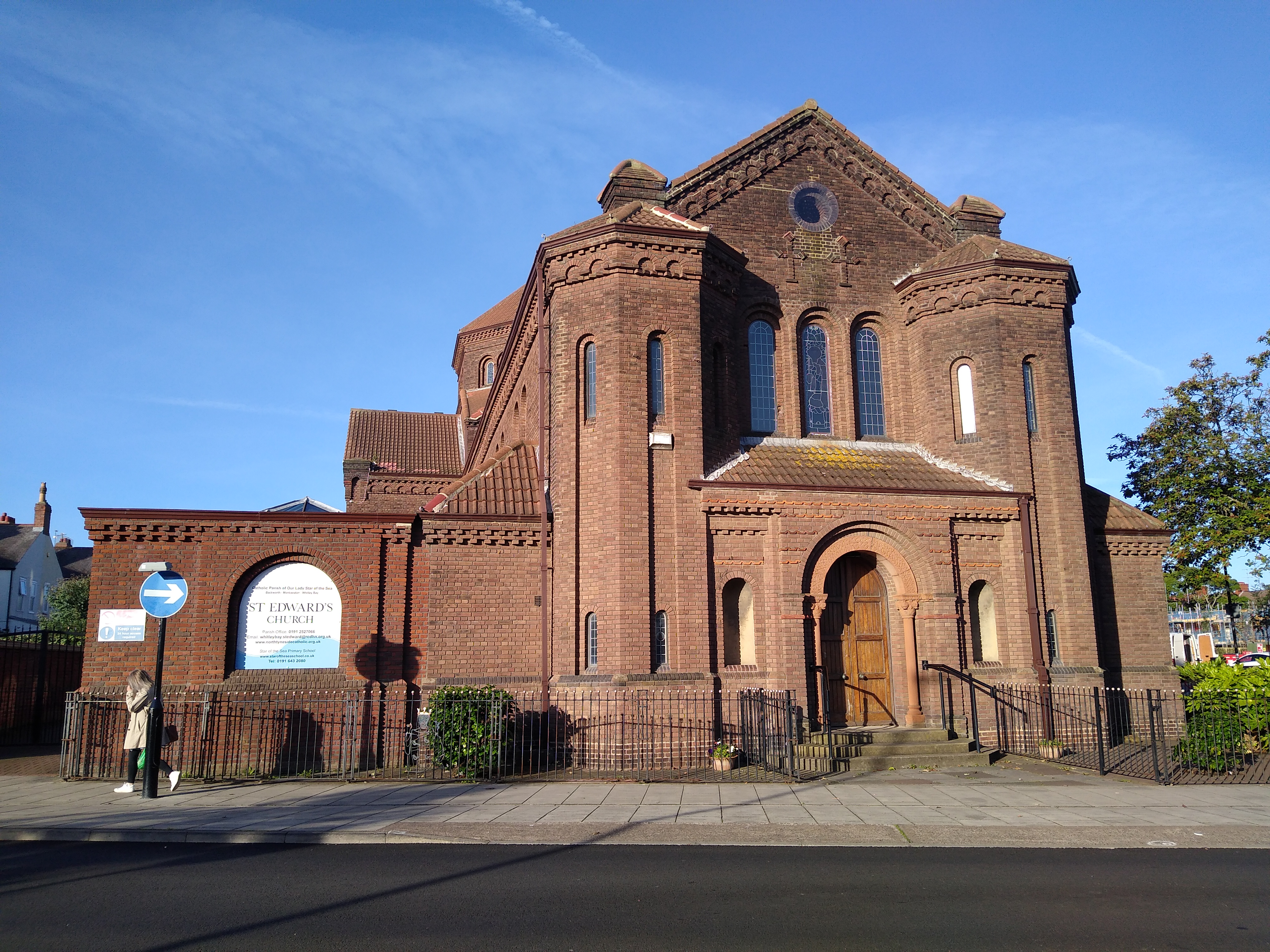
St Edward's Roman Catholic Church

There are a number of Christian denominations and mosques in the town:

- Baptist church
  - Whitley Bay
  - Whitley Lodge
- Roman Catholic church (Diocese of Hexham and Newcastle)
  - St Edward's
  - St Mary's
- Church of England (Diocese of Newcastle)
  - St Alban's, Earsdon
  - St Mary's, Monkseaton
  - St Paul's
  - St Peter's, Monkseaton
- Free Church
  - Havana
  - The Bay
  - Acorn Community
- Methodist church
  - St John's
- United Reformed Church
  - St Andrew's, Monkseaton
- Mosques
  - Whitley Bay Islamic Cultural Centre
  - North Tyneside Bangladeshi Community Association.

== Notable people ==
- Gladstone Adams – inventor of the windscreen wiper and former mayor
- Kate Adie – news reporter and Chief News Correspondent, BBC News (1989–2003). Presenter, From Our Own Correspondent, BBC Radio 4. Born in Whitley Bay.
- Elliot Anderson – footballer
- David Gilford Armstrong – eminent animal nutritionist who was born and raised here
- Michael Bridges – former Newcastle United and Sunderland football player
- Ann Cleeves – author
- Denis Coe – politician
- John Coxon – footballer
- L Devine – singer-songwriter
- Sam Fender – singer-songwriter, former pupil of Whitley Bay High School Sixth Form
- Graham Fenton – footballer
- Toby Flood – England rugby union international
- John Gilroy – artist of Guinness advertisement fame
- Tom Hadaway – playwright
- W. E. Johns – author of Biggles (c. 1925)
- Ian La Frenais – comedy writer (The Likely Lads, Porridge, Auf Wiedersehen, Pet)
- Graham Laws – Football League referee
- WillNE – YouTuber
- Michael Marouli - drag queen
- John Middleton – actor (Emmerdale)
- Tim Palmer - record producer
- Peter Ramage – Queens Park Rangers and former Newcastle United player – former pupil of Whitley Bay High School
- Andrea Riseborough – actor
- Laura Spence – Whitley Bay state school student rejected by Oxford University who later attended Harvard University in the USA
- Steven Taylor – footballer
- Stephen Tompkinson – actor, lives in Whitley Bay
- Steve Tupling – former footballer
- Hilton Valentine – guitarist in The Animals
- Shirley Webb – athlete
- Emily Hilda Young – novelist

== In popular culture ==
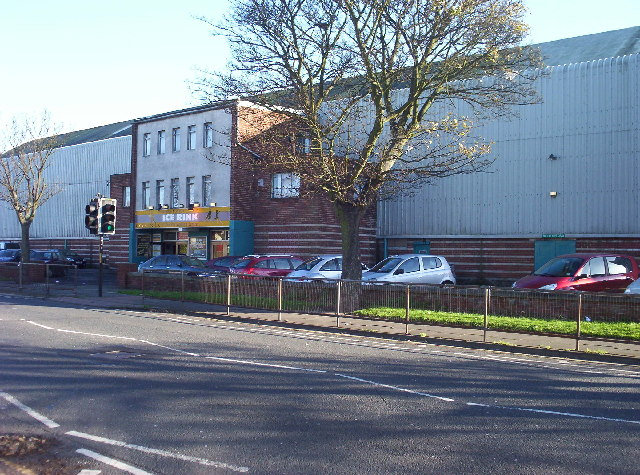
Whitley Bay Ice Rink is the filming location of the sitcom Thin Ice

=== Television ===
In the 1960s, the BBC television series Come Dancing included regional finals broadcast from the Empress Ballroom, Whitley Bay.

Whitley Bay was also featured in the 1980s children's television series Supergran.

Scenes in the early 1990s BBC detective series Spender were filmed in the town and one episode was primarily set at the Whitley Bay Ice Rink. The 2006 BBC sitcom Thin Ice was also filmed in the town and at the ice rink.

Several episodes of ITV's Vera were filmed in the town, including The Rendezvous Cafe and the sea front.

=== Film ===
Parts of the 1976 film The Likely Lads were filmed in the town.

Whitley Bay hosts the Whitley Bay Film Festival.

=== Radio ===
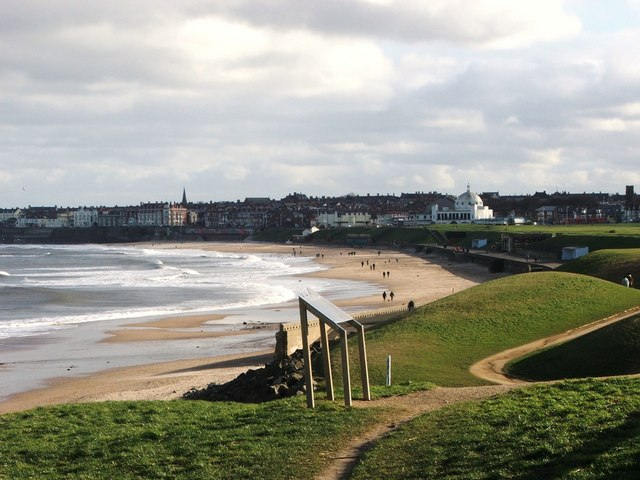
The Links

The Whitley Bay Municipal Orchestra, conducted by Percival Goffin, was regularly broadcast on radio by the BBC in the 1930s, from the Winter Gardens, Whitley Bay. In 1968, BBC Radio 4's Morning Service, was broadcast from St Paul's Church. In 1992, the Radio 1 Roadshow was broadcast from The Links in the town and in 2001, the Radio 1 Dance Party also came from The Links.

=== Literature ===
Whitley Bay is the main location for Ann Cleeves' crime novel The Seagull.

== See also ==
- Bands and musicians from Yorkshire and North East England
- Whitley Bay Pier
