= 1862 in the United Kingdom =

Events from the year 1862 in the United Kingdom.

== Incumbents ==
- Monarch – Victoria
- Prime Minister – Henry John Temple, 3rd Viscount Palmerston (Liberal)

== Events ==
- January – at the end of the longest and most expensive lunacy case in English history, William Frederick Windham, heir to Felbrigg Hall in Norfolk, is declared to be of sound mind.
- 6 January – French and British forces arrive in Mexico, beginning the French intervention in Mexico.
- 16 January – Hartley Colliery Disaster: 204 miners die following collapse of machinery at the Hartley Colliery in Northumberland.
- 15 March – riots in Stalybridge resulting from the Lancashire Cotton Famine.
- 21 March – James Bruce, 8th Earl of Elgin appointed Governor-General of India.
- May – the 10.00 a.m. "Special Scotch Express", predecessor of the Flying Scotsman express train, first departs from London King's Cross for Edinburgh over the East Coast Main Line.
- 1 May – 1862 International Exhibition of Industry and Science opens in South Kensington.
- 16 May – Habeas Corpus Act restricts the right of English courts to issue writs of habeas corpus in British colonies or dominions.
- 24 May – new Westminster Bridge, designed by Thomas Page, is opened in London.
- 5 June – "Geordie" Ridley first sings "Blaydon Races" at Balmbra's Music Hall, Newcastle upon Tyne.
- 30 June – 'Revised Code', introducing a system of 'payment by results' for elementary schools in England and Wales, begins to come into effect. Government aid is given in annual grants based upon attendance and proficiency of students, teacher qualifications, and the state of schools.
- 1 July – marriage of Princess Alice, second daughter of Queen Victoria, to Prince Ludwig of Hesse and by Rhine.
- 4 July – Charles Dodgson ('Lewis Carroll') takes Alice Liddell and her sisters on a rowing trip on The Isis from Folly Bridge, Oxford, to Godstow on which he tells the story that becomes Alice's Adventures in Wonderland.
- 29 July – Confederate commerce raider CSS Alabama is launched clandestinely at Birkenhead by John Laird Sons and Company.
- 7 August – Companies Act 1862 facilitates creation of limited liability companies.
- 31 August – last mail coach runs from Carlisle to Hawick, Scotland.
- 14 September – a British national, Charles Lenox Richardson, is killed in Japan by samurai in the Namamugi Incident. Three companions escape, though two are seriously injured.
- 30 September – Clifton College opens as a public school near Bristol.
- 11 October – Jessie M'Lachlan, having been found guilty in the Sandyford murder case in Glasgow, is to be hanged, but has her sentence commuted to life imprisonment.
- 20 October – Charles Thomas Longley succeeds as Archbishop of Canterbury, being translated from York.
- November – criminal law amended to make robbery with violence punishable by flogging.
- c. November – Joseph Bazalgette begins construction of the Thames Embankment in London.
- 28 November – Notts County F.C. is founded in Nottingham, making it (by the 21st century) the world's oldest Association football playing professionally.
- Joseph Leycester Lyne (Father Ignatius of Jesus) forms the first Anglican Benedictine community, initially at Claydon, Suffolk.

== Publications ==
- Thomas Allan's Tyneside Songs.
- M. E. Braddon's 'sensation novel' Lady Audley's Secret.
- George Eliot's novel Romola (serialisation).
- Herbert Spencer's book First Principles, the first volume of his System of Synthetic Philosophy.
- Anthony Trollope's novel Orley Farm completes publication.

== Births ==
Frederick Delius

- 1 January - Ethel Brilliana (Harley) Tweedie, author, travel writer, biographer, historian, journalist, photographer, and artist, writing as "Mrs. Alec Tweedie," "Mrs. Alec-Tweedie," and "Ethel B. Harley" (d. 1940)
- 29 January – Frederick Delius, composer (d. 1934)
- 17 February – Edward German, composer (d. 1936)
- 11 March – John Cowans, general (d. 1921)
- 1 April – Archibald Bodkin, Director of Public Prosecutions (d. 1957)
- 9 May – Hugh Stowell Scott (Henry Seton Merriman), novelist (d. 1903)
- 27 May – Francis Llewellyn Griffith, Egyptologist (d. 1934)
- 6 June – Henry Newbolt, poet (d. 1938)
- 9 June – Ernest William Moir, civil engineer (d. 1933)
- 10 June – John de Robeck, admiral (d. 1928)
- 2 July
  - William Henry Bragg, physicist, Nobel Prize laureate (d. 1942)
  - Christopher Cradock, admiral (d. 1914)
- 15 July – Ernest Troubridge, admiral (d. 1926)
- 1 August – M. R. James, scholar and horror story writer (d. 1936)
- 5 August – Joseph Merrick, "The Elephant Man" (d. 1890)
- 6 August – Goldsworthy Lowes Dickinson, historian (d. 1932)
- 26 August – Herbert Booth, Salvationist (d. 1926)
- 11 September – Julian Byng, 1st Viscount Byng of Vimy, general (d. 1935)
- 29 September – Fred Russell, "The Father of Modern Ventriloquism" (d. 1957)
- 3 October – Johnny Briggs, cricketer (d. 1902)
- 13 October – Mary Kingsley, travel writer (d. 1900)
- 27 October – Hugh Evan-Thomas, admiral (d. 1928)
- 12 December – J. Bruce Ismay, shipping magnate of White Star Line (d. 1937)
- 28 December – Christina Broom, photographer (d. 1939)

== Deaths ==
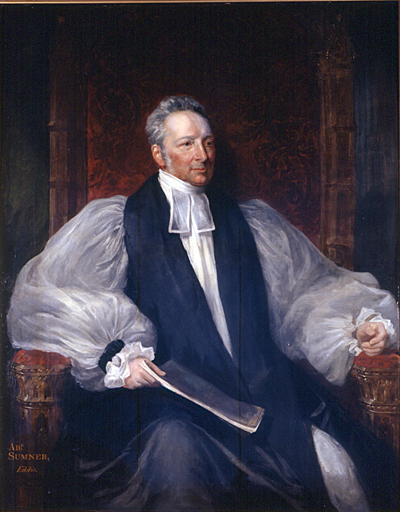
John Bird Sumner

- 3 January – Matthew Cotes Wyatt, painter and sculptor (b. 1777)
- 11 February – Elizabeth Siddal, artist, artist's model and poet, wife of Dante Gabriel Rossetti (b. 1829)
- 1 March – Peter Barlow, mathematician (b. 1776)
- 3 April – Sir James Clark Ross, naval officer and explorer (b. 1800)
- 15 April – Frederick William Hope, entomologist (b. 1797)
- 16 May – Edward Gibbon Wakefield, theorist of colonization (b. 1796)
- 17 June – Charles Canning, 1st Earl Canning, Viceroy of India (b. 1812)
- 29 June – James Bowman Lindsay, inventor (b. 1799)
- 27 August – Thomas Jefferson Hogg, biographer (b. 1792)
- 6 September – John Bird Sumner, Archbishop of Canterbury (b. 1780)
- 24 September – Judith Montefiore, linguist (b. 1784)
- 8 October – James Walker, civil engineer (b. 1781)
- 21 October – Sir Benjamin Collins Brodie, 1st Baronet, physiologist (b. 1783)
- 4 November – Anne Knight, social reformer (b. 1786)
- 26 November – Julia Pardoe, novelist and historian (b. 1804)
- 17 December – Katherine Thomson, writing as Grace Wharton, novelist and historian (b. 1797)
- 19 December – Lucas Barrett, naturalist and geologist (b. 1837)
- 20 December – Robert Knox, Scottish surgeon, anatomist and zoologist (b. 1791)
