= John Balmbra =

British music hall owner (born c. 1811)

John Balmbra (born c. 1811) was the owner, proprietor, manager and licensee of Balmbra's Music Hall in Newcastle, England, to which he gave his name.

John Balmbra was born about 1811 in Alnwick, Northumberland. He became owner and licensee of the Wheatsheaf Public House at 6 Cloth Market, Newcastle, possibly from 1859 to 1864.

In about 1848 a first floor room of the pub was opened and in later advertisements was called "The Royal Music Saloon" (this name appears in advertisements dated 1859).

In about 1862 it appears that the room was rebuilt and the name changed to Balmbra's Music Hall. It was here that the song "Blaydon Races" was first performed by George "Geordie" Ridley in 1862, The song referring to the Music Hall by name, as the starting point of the trip – "I took the bus from Balmbra’s and she was heavy-laden, Away we went along Collingwood Street, that’s on the road to Blaydon."
