= Joshua L. Bagnall =

Joshua L Bagnall was a Tyneside composer of the early and mid-19th century.

== Details ==
Bagnall was a Tyneside singer/songwriter. In the late 19th century he published a small book of his own Tyneside songs.

Bagnall became proprietor of the Oxford Music Hall c. 1865. The change of name for "The Wheatsheaf Music Hall" (previously "Balmbra's Music Hall") to the "Oxford Music Hall" appeared in advertisements c. 1865, and with the new name came a new ownership/management, in the form of (described in Allan's Tyneside Songs as "spirited") Joshua L Bagnall and Walter William Blakey.

Whilst in this position he seems to have concentrated his writing skills solely to the Christmas pantomimes. There is no record of the length of his stay at the Oxford, but the advertisements for events at the Oxford appeared to cease c. 1879, which would point to its closure as a music hall.

Bagnall later became the landlord of "The Cannon Public House", Durham Road, Low Fell, Gateshead.

== Songs ==
Several of the songs attributed to him appear in The Songs of the Tyne being a collection of Popular Local Songs Number 10, published by John Ross, Printer and Publisher, Royal Arcade, Newcastle.

These songs are:

- Calleyforney O ! (in volume 1) to the tune of Polly Parker
- Tom Johnson (in volume 5) to the tune of Tallygrip
- Tommy Carr's discussion wiv his wife, on the choice of a trade for their son Jack (in volume 6) to the tune of Cappy, or The Pitman's Dog
- The Pitman's museum (in volume 7)
- Callerforney - A dialogue (in volume 7) to the tune of Alley Creaker
- Two Hundred Years to come (in volume 8) to the tune of Days we went gipsying

In addition to these songs

- Yer gannin to be a keelman, sung by Edward Corvan, was originally composed by Joshua L. Bagnall according to "A collection of songs by North-East Music Hall artist Ned Corvan"
- Cuddy Willy's Deeth, appears in Allan's Tyneside Songs on page 522 and Walker’s Songs of the Tyne volume 2 page 18

== See also ==
- The Cannon
- Geordie dialect words
- The Songs of the Tyne
