= Cullercoats Metro station =

Tyne and Wear Metro station in North Tyneside

Cullercoats
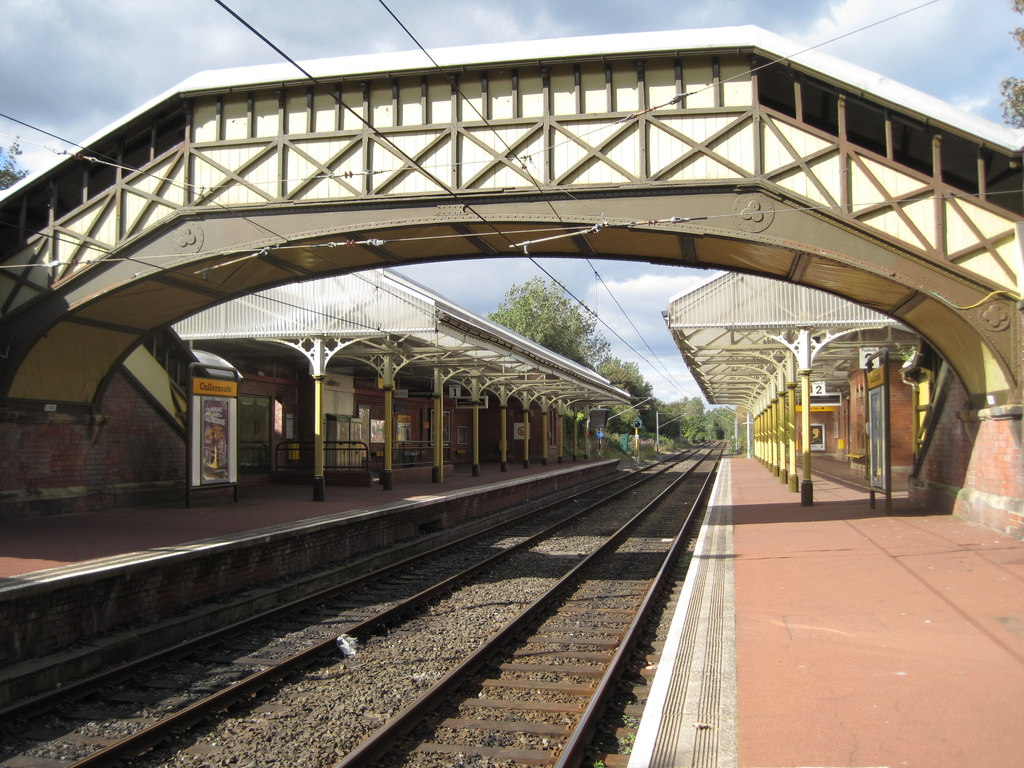

General information
- Location: Cullercoats, North Tyneside; England
- Coordinates: 55°02′06″N 1°26′11″W
- Grid reference: NZ361712
- System: Tyne and Wear Metro station
- Transit authority: Tyne and Wear PTE
- Platforms: 2
- Tracks: 2

Construction
- Parking: 22 spaces
- Cycle facilities: 6 cycle pods
- Accessible: Step-free access to platform

Other information
- Station code: CUL
- Fare zone: C

History
- Original company: Blyth and Tyne Railway
- Pre-grouping: North Eastern Railway
- Post-grouping: London and North Eastern Railway; British Rail (Eastern Region)

Key dates
- 27 June 1864: Opened
- 3 July 1882: Resited
- 10 September 1979: Closed for conversion
- 11 August 1980: Reopened

Passengers
- 2024/25: 0.588 million

Services
Preceding station	Tyne and Wear Metro	Following station
Whitley Bay towards South Shields via Whitley Bay	Yellow line	Tynemouth towards St James
Location
- Location within Tyne and Wear

Cullercoats is a Tyne and Wear Metro station, serving the suburbs of Cullercoats and Marden, North Tyneside in Tyne and Wear, England. It joined the network on 11 August 1980, following the opening of the first phase of the network, between Haymarket and Tynemouth via Four Lane Ends.

== History ==
The original Cullercoats station was opened under the North Eastern Railway on 27 June 1864, and was located further inland than the current site. This station, in the area now occupied by housing on Sedbergh Road, was closed when the line was re-routed to be closer to the North Sea coast.

The replacement station was built by the North Eastern Railway, as part of the North Tyneside Loop, opening in July 1882. While built on a smaller scale than neighbouring Tynemouth and Whitley Bay stations, it still proved popular with commuters and visitors alike – with 271,939 tickets being issued in 1911.

Most of the original station structures are still present, the only major architectural changes being alterations to the verandahs, dating from the 1920s (although the original ironwork was retained), and the demolition of the station master's house in the early 1970s. The station's adjoining signal box has also been demolished.

The station closed for conversion in September 1979, ahead of opening as part of the Tyne and Wear Metro network, re-opening in August 1980. Conversion work saw only minor modifications made to the station buildings and platforms, consisting mainly of new signage and restoration work.

Cullercoats was refurbished, along with Monkseaton and West Monkseaton, in 2018, as part of the Metro: All Change programme. The refurbishment involved the installation of new seating and lighting, resurfaced platforms, and improved security and accessibility. The station was also painted in to the new black and white corporate colour scheme.

== Facilities ==
Step-free access is available at all stations across the Tyne and Wear Metro network, with level access to both platforms. Step-free access between platforms is by the Mast Lane bridge, which is located about 150 m (490 ft) to the south of the station. The station is equipped with ticket machines, waiting shelter, seating, next train information displays, timetable posters, and an emergency help point on both platforms. Ticket machines are able to accept payment with credit and debit card (including contactless payment), notes and coins. The station is also fitted with smartcard validators, which feature at all stations across the network. The station houses a shop, on the southbound platform (trains towards St. James), specialising in pet accessories, which opened in January 2015.

There is a small free car park available, with 22 spaces. There is also the provision for cycle parking, with six cycle pods available for use.

== Services ==
As of April 2021, the station is served by up to five trains per hour on weekdays and Saturday, and up to four trains per hour during the evening and on Sunday.

== Art ==
The installation The Day Before You Looked Through Me by British artist, Cathy de Monchaux, was commissioned for the station in 1998, and features in the ticket area of the southbound platform. In 2011, Paul William Llewellyn Jones's Whitley Bay in Colour was installed at the station, showcasing a number of images of the North Tyneside coastline.
