= Cushie Butterfield =

Song performed by George "Geordie" Ridley

Song by George "Geordie" Ridley
- Language: English (Geordie)
- Written: 1800s
- Published: 1862
- Songwriter: George "Geordie" Ridley

"Cushie Butterfield" is a famous Geordie folk song written in the 19th century by Geordie Ridley, in the style of the music hall popular in the day. It is regarded by many as the second unofficial anthem of Tyneside after Blaydon Races.

This now famous local piece pokes fun at one of the many (at the time) whitening-stone sellers. The stone, made of baked clay (or "yella clay") was used to clean and decorate the stone steps leading up to the front door of the many terrace houses in the area. (The material, or similar, was in common use throughout the country.) Ridley had to leave the area for a while when the song initially caused consternation with the real-life stone sellers. It is apparently the last song written by him.

The song was featured, along with a number of other Geordie folk songs of yesteryear, in "Geordie The Musical" which premiered at the Customs House in South Shields in 2015 and was recommissioned in 2017 at the Tyne Theatre & Opera House as part of their 150-year anniversary celebrations.

== Lyrics ==
The song was first published in 1862 by Thomas Allan in his book of a collection of Tyneside songs. The music was by Harry Clifton (1832–1872) originally composed and performed by him as "Pretty Polly Perkins of Paddington Green", though possibly not published in the original version until a year or two after the words to "Cushey Butterfield" had appeared in print.

The version below is taken from the 1873 edition of the book, now titled "A Choice collection of Tyneside songs, by Wilson, Corvan, Mitford, Gilchrist, Robson, Harrison ... with the lives of the authors, illustrated with views of the town and portraits of the poets and eccentrics of Newcastle". It appears on pages 220 & 221. This version is as follows:

CUSHEY BUTTERFIELD' Air – “Pretty Polly Perkins of Paddington Green” THE LAST SONG WRITTEN BY GEORGE RIDLEY.

Aw's a broken hearted keelman and Aw's owerheed in luv
Wiv a yung lass in Gyetshead an' aw caals her me duv;
Her nyem's Cushy Butterfield, an' she sells yella clay,
An' her cusin is a muckman, an' they caall him Tom Gray.

KORUS.
She's a big lass an' a bonny one,
An' she likes her beer;
An, they call her Cushy Butterfield,
An' aw wish she was here.

Her eyes are like two holes in a blanket burnt throo,
An' her brows in a mornin wad spyen a yung coo;
An' when aw heer her shootin "Will ye buy ony clay,"
Like a candy man's trumpet, it steels maw young hart away.

KORUS—She's a big lass an' a bonny one, &c.

Ye'll oft see hor doon at Sandgate when the fresh herrin cums in;
She's like a bagfull o' sawdust tied roond wiv a string;
She weers big golashes, te, an' her stockins was wonce white,
An' her bedgoon is a laelock, an' her hat's nivor strite,

KORUS—She's a big lass an' a bonny one, &c.

When aw axed her te marry me, she started te laff,
"Noo, nyen o' yor monkey tricks, for aw like ne such chaff !"
Then she start’d a bubblin, an' roar’d like a bull,
An' the cheps i the keel says aw-m nowt but a fyeul.

KORUS—She's a big lass an' a bonny one, &c.

She says "The chep that gets me'll heh to work ivry day,
An when he cums hyem at neets he’ll heh te gan an' seek clay;
An' when he's away seekin't aal myek balls an' sing'
Weel may the keel row that my laddies in !"

KORUS—She's a big lass an' a bonny one, &c

Noo, aw heer she hes anuther chep, an' he hews at Shipcote'
If aw thowt she wad deceive me, ah'd sure cut me throat;
Aal doon the river sailin, an_sing "Aam afloat,"
Biddin addo te Cushy Butterfield an' the chep at Shipcote.

KORUS—She's a big lass an' a bonny one, &c

For a translation, see Geordie dialect words

=== Places mentioned ===
Gyetshead is Gateshead, the town on the opposite (south) side of the River Tyne from Newcastle upon Tyne
Sandgate pronounced Sandgit, is (or was) an area of the town named from the Sand Gate, one of the six main gates in the Newcastle town wall, a medieval defensive wall, the remaining parts of which are a Scheduled Ancient Monument. The quayside section of the wall was pulled down in 1763 and the Sand Gate in 1798. In 1701 the Keelmen's Hospital was built in the Sandgate area of the city, using funds provided by the keelmen. This building still stands today.
Shipcote was a colliery in Gateshead.

=== Trades mentioned ===
Keelman were the dockers of yesteryear, who worked on the keels (or keelboats) of the River Tyne. Many, in fact the majority, resided as a close-knit community with their families in the Sandgate area, to the east of the city and beside the river. Their work included working on the keels/keelboats which were used to transfer coal from the river banks to the waiting colliers, for transport to various destinations including London.
A hewer is a Geordie and mining term for the miner who digs the coal.

A muckman is a sewage worker.

== Comments on variations to the above version ==
NOTE –

- Generally – "HER" is pronounced (and usually in later versions spelt) "HOR"
  - "CUSHY" is spelt differently in Verse 1 line 3 and the chorus from that in the song title "CUSHEY" or modern day "CUSHIE"
- Verse 1 line 1 "AW" (meaning "I") is now, and in later versions, often spelt "Aa" or "I's"
  - line 1 "HEARTED" is (often in later versions" spelt "HAIRTED"
  - line 2 & verse 2 line 2 – "YUNG" is spelt differently from the standard spelling "young" in those lines, but the spelling "young" appears in verse 2 line 4
- Chorus (or KORUS) – "CALL" is pronounced (and in some later versions spelt) "CAALL"
  - "BEER" is (in some later versions) spelt "BEOR"
- Verse 3 line 1 "SANDGATE" pronounced (and later often written as) "SANDGIT"
  - line 2 "SAWDUST" pronounced (and later often spelt) "SAARDUST"
  - line 3 "GOLASHES" (the Geordie term for, and later mis-spelt as) "GALOSHES"
- Verse 4 line 1 "WHEN" pronounced (and now often spelt) "WHAN"
  - line 1 the "ME" after marry is now often written (and sung as) "US"
  - line 2 the publisher has inserted an extra space after monkey

== Recordings ==
Owen Brannigan (1908–73) was one of England's most popular bass singers in his day. His E.P. Folk Songs From Northumbria (ref 7EG 8551) included Cushie Butterfield together with six other titles and a YouTube recording is available.

Brendan Grace had a number 3 hit with the song in 1975. His version is often associated with being amongst the most popular.

Sting, a Tyneside native, recorded a version in 1991 on For Our Children, a charity album produced by Disney to raise awareness of HIV/AIDS.

Punk band Gingersfarne released a "badpunk" version of the song as the A-side to their 2017 third EP A Fishy Butter Dish which features a "cursed image" of Brannigan as the cover art.

== See also ==
Geordie dialect words
Pretty Polly Perkins of Paddington Green
