= St George's, Cullercoats =

Church in Tyne & Wear, England

Coordinates: 55.031°N 1.431°W

St. George's Church, Cullercoats
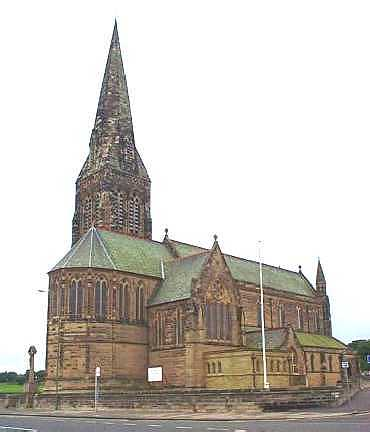
- St. George's Church, Cullercoats
- Denomination: Church of England
- Churchmanship: High church
- Website: www.stgeorgescullercoats.org.uk

Administration
- Province: York
- Diocese: Newcastle
- Archdeaconry: Northumberland
- Parish: Cullercoats

St George's Church in Cullercoats, Tyne and Wear, England, is a church built in the 19th-century French Gothic style. It is an active place of worship and is a Grade I listed building.

== Background ==
Looking over the North Sea, beacon-like, it was designed by the church architect John Loughborough Pearson and built in 1884 by the 6th Duke of Northumberland. The church, in particular its impressive spire of 180 feet, was used as a navigational aid by the fishermen of Cullercoats as well as by major shipping approaching Tynemouth in times gone by. Restoration work on this church has included the replacing of dangerously corroding stonework, roof repairs and the cleaning of some of the stained glass. The church is a Grade I listed building.

== Music ==
=== Choir ===
St George's choir has been described as "one of the best parish church choirs in the country". The choir sing for the Sung Eucharist every Sunday and at major weekday festivals.

=== Organ ===
The organ was built by Thomas Christopher Lewis in consultation with William Rea, the Newcastle City organist, and was dedicated a mere three months after the consecration of the church in February 1885. It stands in the south transept, directly under the tower, facing north, with a generous amount of free space around it. From this position, its commanding voice can be heard in all parts of the building without loss of impact, even with a full congregation. It is a substantial instrument, built in Lewis's grand style with Swell behind Great on the same level and Pedal on three-unit chests behind and alongside the manual divisions. There is no facade casework, although the front pipes appear to have been laid out to receive one, the lower part is panelled in oak. The console is central in the case and is 'en fenêtre'. The action to manuals and drawstops is mechanical; the pedal action is pneumatic. A Discus blower feeds the main bellows which can still be raised by hand. A full restoration of the organ was carried out in 1987, by Harrison & Harrison of Durham. The organ is one of a small number in the country designed by Lewis which have not been significantly altered. The church has a regular recital series on bank holidays and in the summer months.

==== List of organists ====
- Mr. Smith 1884
- Mr C.H.S. Sherlock 1884 – 1891
- Charles Chambers 1893– unknown date
- Frederick Younger Robson 1897–1920
- May Baker 1920–1929
- Harry Davison 1930–1943
- Mr.G. S. Bell 1944–1947
- Colin Hayes 1947–1967
- Richard Capener 1967–1972
- David Jones 1972–1976
- John Harker 1976–1981
- Paul Ritchie 1981–2005 (David Noble deputised during Paul Ritchie's leave of absence 1989–1991)
- Shaun Turnbull 2005–2011
- Robert Gage 2011–2012
- Jonathan Clinch 2012–2013
- Robert Gage 2013–2014
- Peter Locke 2014–2015
- Craig Cartwright 2015
- Andrew Reid 2017–present

=== Bells ===
The church has four fixed bells which are struck by hammers operated by bell ropes from the ringing chamber. Two of the bells' hammers require repair (damaged due to wear and tear 2005). The smallest bell is most used as it has a second pulley in a more convenient location.

== See also ==
- List of new ecclesiastical buildings by J. L. Pearson
