= Cullercoats =

Coordinates: 55.033°N 1.433°W

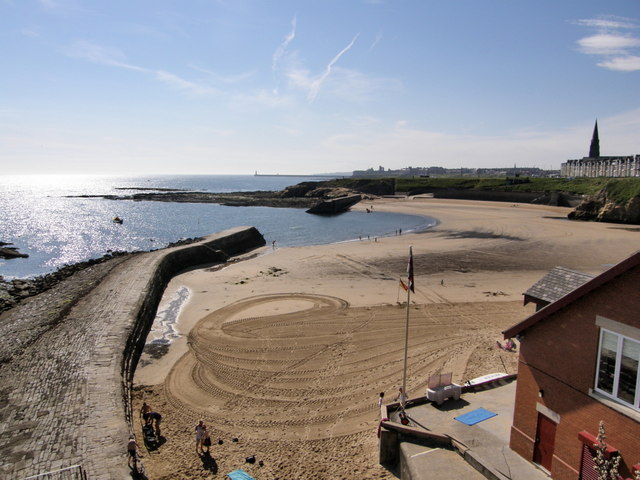
- View of Cullercoats Bay from the north. The spire of St George's, Cullercoats is visible top right. Bottom right is the lifeboat station.

- Location within Tyne and Wear
- OS grid reference: NZ3621571133
- Metropolitan borough: North Tyneside
- Metropolitan county: Tyne and Wear
- Region: North East
- Country: England
- Sovereign state: United Kingdom
- Post town: North Shields
- Postcode district: NE30
- Dialling code: 0191
- Police: Northumbria
- Fire: Tyne and Wear
- Ambulance: North East
- UK Parliament: Tynemouth

Cullercoats is a coastal village in the metropolitan borough of North Tyneside, Tyne and Wear, England. Historically in Northumberland, it has now been absorbed into the wider Tyneside conurbation, sitting between Tynemouth to the south and Whitley Bay to the north.

There is a semi-circular sandy beach with cliffs and six caves, and the village is a popular destination for day-trippers.

== Etymology ==
The name Cullercoats, sometimes archaically Cullercotes, is of Old English origin and originally meant "dove cots", derived from the elements culfre ("dove, pigeon") and cot ("cottage, hut, shelter, cot").

== History and architecture ==
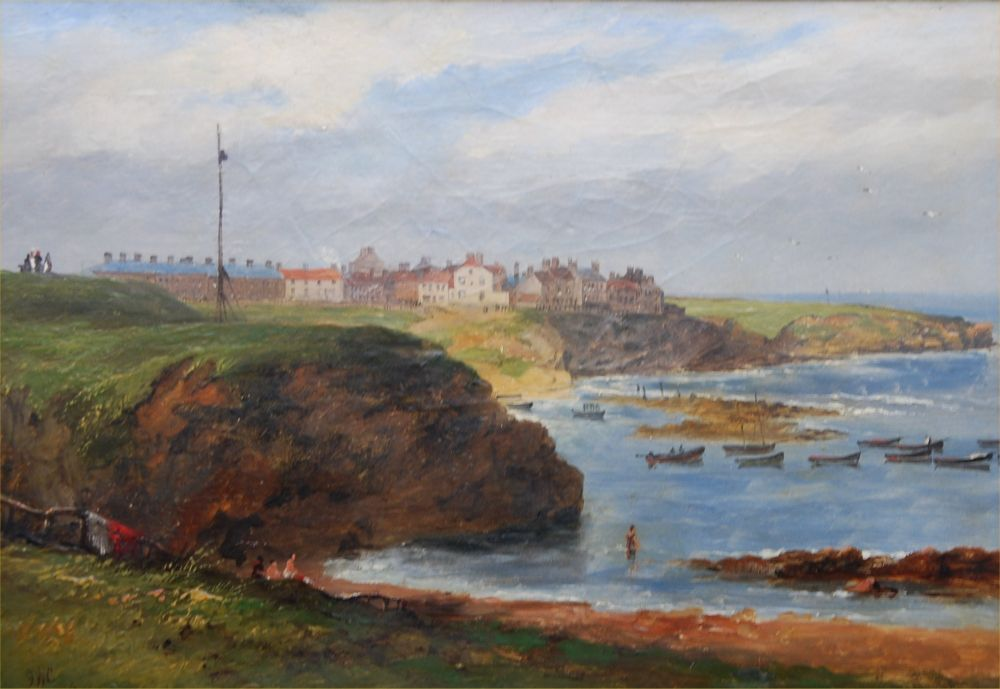
Cullercoats from the South by John Wilson Carmichael, 1845

Cullercoats village was founded in 1539. Historically the village depended on fishing; there was also local coal mining in so-called bell pits. The coal was used to fire salt pans (now long gone) on the field now known as the boat field. As a port, Cullercoats was used to export both salt and coal from the 1670s. A new harbour and pier were constructed in 1682 and a waggonway that brought coal to the village from inland workings was added in 1690. These innovations resulted in a flourishing trade. However the salt industry declined and the growth of the railways led to coal shipments being relocated to better harbours. By 1710 the pier had been severely damaged and the condition of the waggonway had deteriorated. In 1724 the Whitley and Cullercoats colleries were closed. The last salt pans moved to Blyth in 1726. This left fishing as the main industry and two piers were built on either side of the harbour in the 19th century to provide shelter for the many open top fishing vessels, or cobles, launched from the harbour. In 1801 the population of the village was 452.

The harbour is the home of the Dove Marine Laboratory of 1897, a research and teaching laboratory which forms part of the School of Marine Science and Technology within Newcastle University.

In 1848 a coble, taking a pilot to a ship further out at sea, capsized with the loss of all on board. In response to this disaster the local landowner, the Duke of Northumberland funded the setting up of Cullercoats Lifeboat Station. The following year a second disaster, this time costing 20 lifeboat crew their lives, prompted the Duke to sponsor a competition to design a self-righting lifeboat. The resulting boat, the Percy was built at the Duke's expense and delivered to Cullercoats in 1852. The Brigade House and watchtower were designed by Newcastle upon Tyne-based architect Frank West Rich in 1877–79, but the lifeboat station remained in use, with a few minor alterations, until 2003 when a new RNLI station was opened. In 2022 Cullercoats had its first all-female lifeboat crew.

The Bay Hotel, an important local landmark, was demolished in 2004. It was notable for a period in the 1880s when it was home to the American watercolour artist Winslow Homer who stayed in room 17 of the Hudleston Arms (1870) (later called the Bay Hotel), and maintained a studio across the road at No.12 Bank Top (demolished 1930). Homer was a resident in Cullercoats from April 1881 to November 1882. An apartment block, named Winslow Court, has been built on the site of the Bay Hotel (2007).

Homer was the most famous of the professional artists who were part of the "Cullercoats Colony" in the period 1870–1920. Others included Henry H. Emmerson, Robert Jobling, Arthur H. Marsh, Isa Thompson, John Falconer Slater and John Charlton and visitors like Ralph Hedley. In 2012 some of their works were exhibited at Segedunum.

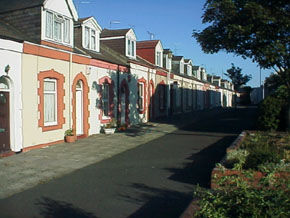
Simpson Street, June 2001

Cullercoats is interesting from an architectural perspective: on Simpson Street there is a row of fishermen's cottages which were preserved during the redevelopment of the village in the 1970s. Between the coast and the railway (now Metro) line are Victorian terraces. The land immediately on the other side consists of long avenues of semi-detached houses built between the wars. Another change can be seen along the line of Broadway where the housing changes again to mixed semi-detached/detached 1970s and 1980s housing estates built around long winding roads and cul-de-sacs. Also of note is St George's Parish Church as a good example of Gothic revival architecture.

The present railway station was first opened by the North Eastern Railway in 1882, and the original station buildings are still in use, now served by the Tyne and Wear Metro.

== Governance ==
Cullercoats was formerly a township and chapelry in the parish of Tynemouth, in 1866 Cullercoats became a separate civil parish, on 1 April 1908 the parish was abolished and merged with Tynemouth. In 1901 the parish had a population of 1743. It is now in the unparished area of Tynemouth.

== Cullercoats Fish Lass ==
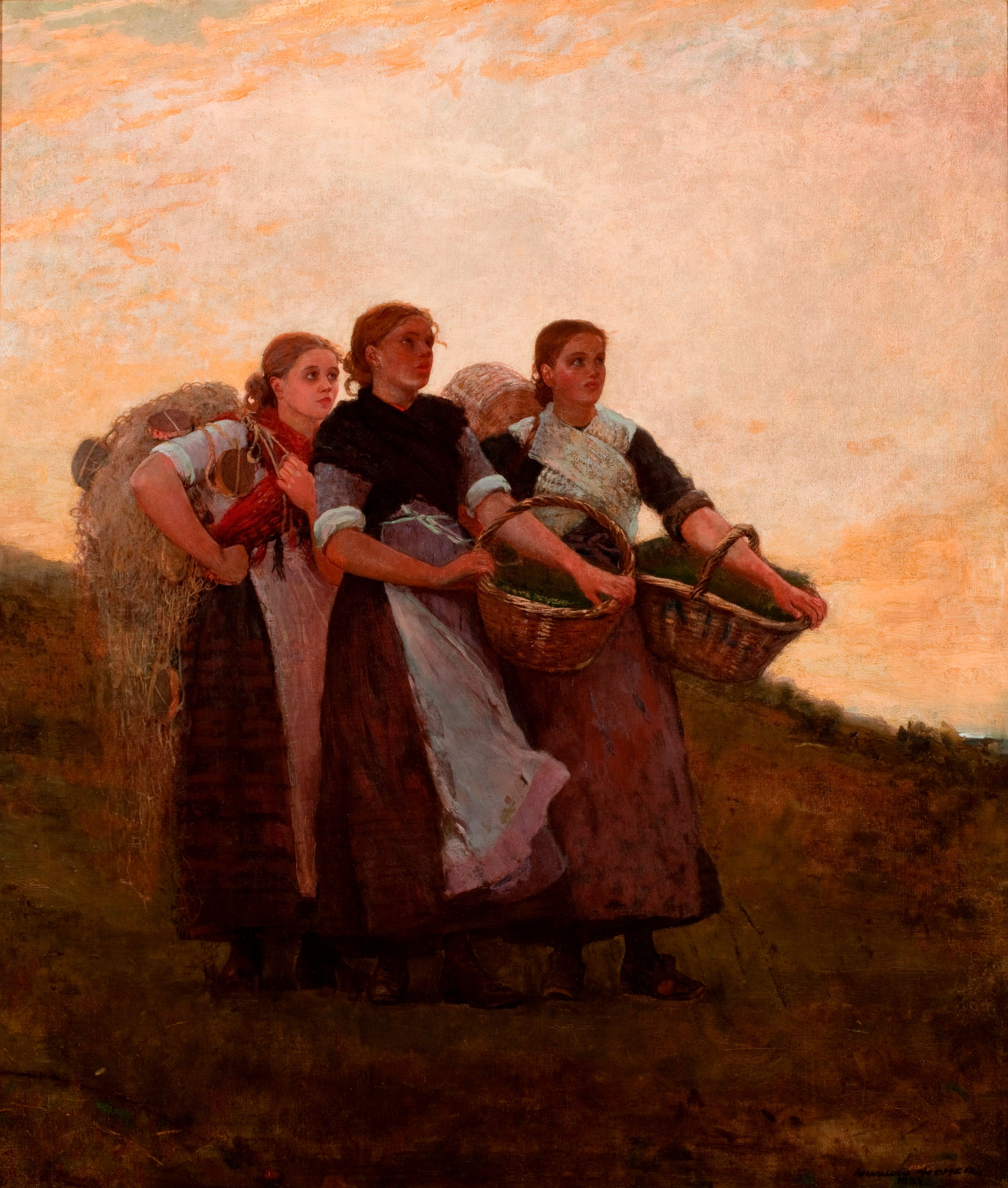
Winslow Homer, Hark! The Lark, 1882 (Milwaukee Art Museum)

William Finden noted that the fishwives (wives and daughters of the fishermen) searched for the bait, digging sand-worms, gathering mussels or seeking limpets and dog-crabs. They also assisted in baiting the hooks. In addition to this, they carried the fish to the market to sell them. "When fish are scarce, they not unfrequently carried a load on their shoulders, weighing between three or four stone, to Newcastle, which is about ten miles distant from Cullercoats, in the hope of meeting with a better market."

The Cullercoats Fish Lass became a popular subject for many of the Cullercoats Artist Colony, most notably Winslow Homer. While he resided from the spring of 1881 to November 1882, Homer became sensitive to the strenuous and courageous lives of its inhabitants, particularly the women, whom he depicted many times, hauling and cleaning fish, mending nets, and, most poignantly, standing at the water's edge, awaiting the return of their men.

Jean F. Terry wrote, in 1913, "The Cullercoats fishwife, with her cheerful weather-bronzed face, her short jacket and ample skirts of blue flannel, and her heavily laden "creel" of fish is not only appreciated by the brotherhood of brush and pencil, but is one of the notable sights of the district".

William S Garson, in his 1935 book, The Romance of Old Tynemouth and Cullercoats, wrote: "The Cullercoats fishwife plays a man's part in helping to launch the lifeboat, frequently wading waist-high into furious and ice-cold waters, and she never hesitates to allow her man to take a place on the boat, though he may go to face death and disaster."

North Tyneside based film company, ACT 2 CAM, made a film in 2013 about the life of a young fishwife, entitled The Cullercoats Fishlass. The story follows the fortunes of a young fishwife living at the turn of the 20th century. Over 150 young people aged 8–18 were engaged in the creation of the film, working on screen and behind the camera.

== Popular culture ==
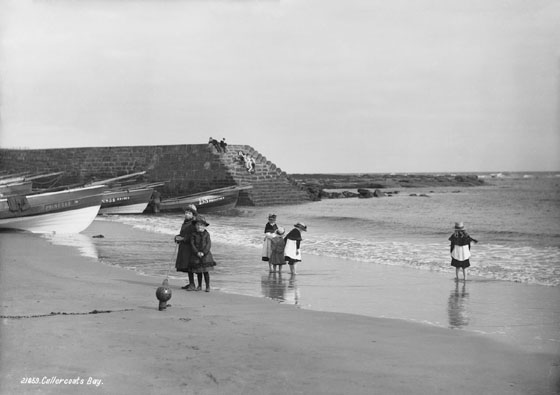
Cullercoats beach in 1888

Edward Corvan wrote and performed a popular music hall song, "The Cullercoats Fish Lass", in 1862:

Aw's a Cullercoats fish-lass, se cozy an' free
Browt up in a cottage close on by the sea;
An' aw sell fine fresh fish ti poor an' ti rich--
Will ye buy, will ye buy, will ye buy maw fresh fish?

Local English schoolmaster, musician and songwriter John Gair "Jack" Robson, wrote the song Cullercoats Bay. Copyrighted in 1950, and performed by Owen Brannigan/Gerald Moore in 1960, the lyrics sing the praises of the town, claiming:

In many strange lands o'er the ocean I've been,
And countless the beautiful sights I have seen,
But I'm a Tynesider, and proudly must say,
I've seen nothing finer than Cullercoats Bay.

The song "Tunnel of Love" by the British rock band Dire Straits, which was included on their 1980 album Making Movies, mentions Cullercoats.

Elinor Brent-Dyer's novel for adults, Jean of Storms, originally serialised in the Shields Gazette in 1930, is set in a fictionalised Cullercoats called Hasnett.

== Notable residents ==
- Chas Chandler — bass guitarist with the Animals and manager of Jimi Hendrix
- Percy Dawson — footballer
- Winslow Homer — American painter
- Carol Malia — BBC Look North presenter
- George Relph — actor
- Christian Rodska — actor
- John Falconar Slater - artist
- Andy Taylor — musician with Duran Duran
- Ross Welford — children's author.

== Cullercoats Life Brigade House ==
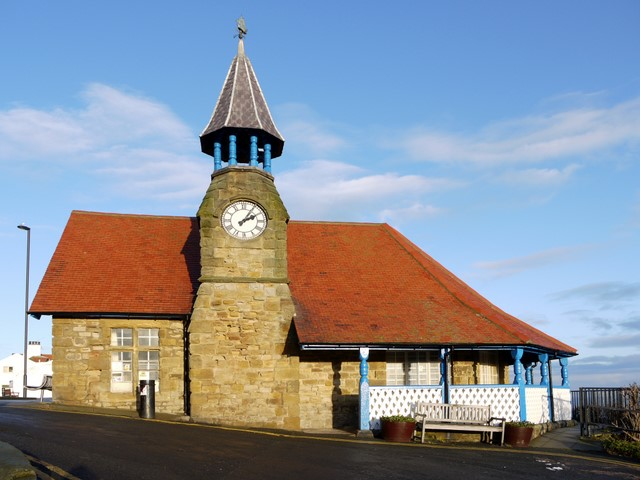
Watch House

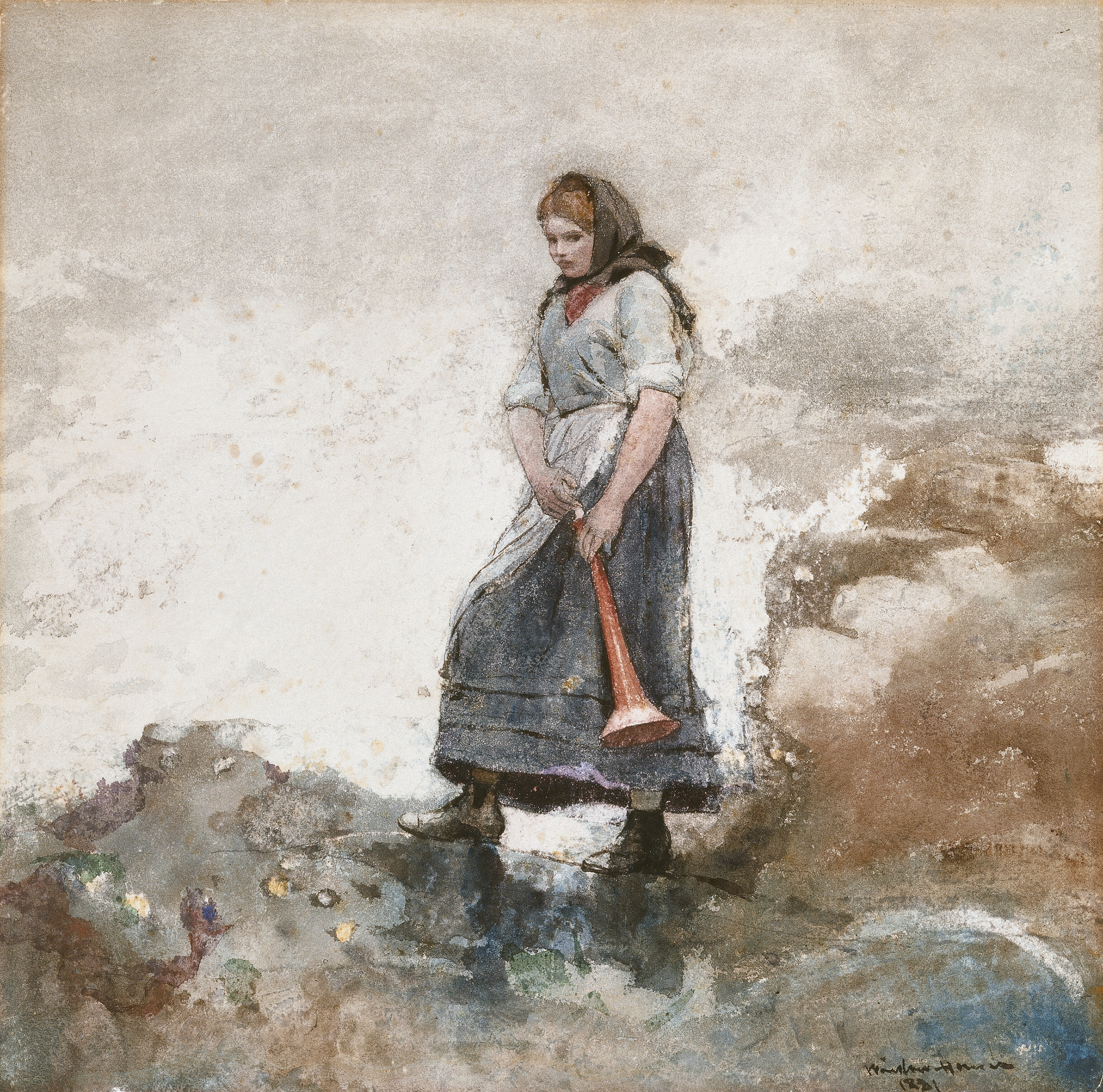
Daughter of the Coast Guard by Winslow Homer, 1881, (Thyssen-Bornemisza Museum, Madrid)

The Watch House is a notable building, built in 1879 for the use of the Cullercoats Volunteer Life Brigade. It is grade II listed.

Cullercoats Life Brigade was formed early in the year 1865, and was the second Brigade enrolled in the United Kingdom. At that time it numbered 60 to 70 men. Nearly the whole of the members of this Brigade are fishermen, and it speaks well for their zeal and determination, when we find that not only do a great many of the original members still keep up their connection with the work, but that their numbers have increased to about 100 men.

The duty of the Life Brigade is to assist the Coast Guard in their endeavours to save life from shipwreck, by means of the rocket apparatus, and as this duty cannot be efficiently carried without a strict watch being kept in the stormiest of winter weather, and that frequently night and day, it will at once be seen that unless there is some means of shelter provided, the men must be exposed to the full fury of the worst storms. At Cullercoats the only shelter for men engaged in this duty was a stone wall, which was of comparatively little service.

For many years the question of having a place of shelter has been discussed, and it was finally decided, about two years ago, to appeal to the Board of Trade on the subject. Plans were drawn by Frank Wm. Rich architect, estimates were obtained, and the present site fixed on. The point on which it was proposed to build the house is the place where the Cullercoats fisher folk have been accustomed to assemble from time immemorial to watch the fishing boats go out and come into the bay, and in bad weather many have been the weary and anxious watched under the lee of the old wall which stood on this point, for the return of husbands, fathers, sons, and brothers, when sudden storms have arisen, and precious lives have been "in peril on the sea".

This being the case, it was quite evident that it would not do to appropriate this position for the use of the members of the Life Brigade alone, and the Board of Trade very properly came to the conclusion that as the look-out would be used not only by the Life Brigade but frequently by the fishing population in general, it would hardly do for the whole expense of building the Brigade-house and look-out to be paid for out of the Mercantile Marine fund. It was therefore decided that a considerable part of the cost must be raised in the locality. The original estimate was £385 15s 6d, and on a guarantee being given that £170 of this sum would be forthcoming, the Board of Trade at once ordered the work to go on. So soon as this was done, one or two gentlemen set to work to raise the money. As time went on, and the building progressed, several important alterations were proposed, which, whilst they have greatly increased the cost, have added much to the usefulness of the building; amongst others the Clock Turret. One great object in having a bell to the clock is that it may be rung in foggy weather to denote to the fishing boats their approach to land. It has already been used to this purpose, and with great advantage to the boats.

The clock works are those belonging the old Cullercoats clock, which some twenty years ago had, by the kindness of a few philanthropic individuals, been placed in the end of a private house for the use of the fishing population of the village, and with the consent of all concerned it was removed to the position in the new building which it now occupies. The Corporation of Tynemouth undertook to put the works in order, find a new dial, &c., and light it, the belfry, bell, and striking works being paid for by a further addition to the subscription list. In addition to these extras, were various others which were not contemplated when the building was projected the cost of which has been partly defrayed by the Board of Trade, and partly by additional donations from private individuals.

The very severe weather which prevailed last Winter showed clearly that it would be better to underset the Rock Point on which the house stands, and the architect, Mr J. W. Rich, has kindly looked into the matter, and he estimates that it will cost at least £70 to do this effectually. It is proposed at once to do the work, and it is hoped that many gentlemen who have not already given contributions may be induced to do so. In the house has been placed one of the most approved American stoves, with all needful cooking utensils. In very stormy weather it is usual for some members of the Brigade to keep watch with the Coast Guard, for vessels in distress, in order that if wrecks do occur immediate assistance may be rendered.

In such circumstances the stove will prove of great value, as it will not only enable those on watch to have suitable food without leaving their duty, but it will at once enable them to apply such warm restoratives to the unfortunate shipwrecked persons whom they may rescue, as may be most suitable to their cases. The widow of a fisherman who has drowned some years ago (Mrs Susan Storey), has been appointed as caretaker and cleaner of the House.

The ladies and gentlemen who have assisted by their contributions to erect the building would urge the residents in Cullercoats to do all they can to make it as useful as possible to those for whose good it is intended, and this may be accomplished in many ways; by presenting books for a library, by getting clever men to give lectures on popular and useful subjects, and they would suggest that a mixed committee of fishermen and other persons should at once be appointed whose duty will be to meet monthly, and discuss and arrange all matters affecting the welfare of the Brigade, and the proper management of the house. With this object in view a meeting will be held on an early day.

Finally, it may be stated that there will still be a small balance left in the Bank after all charges are paid, and this will go towards undersetting the cliff. As has been stated before, further contributions will be thankfully received toward this object, and also to start the Brigade with a small balance to cover expenses for the first twelve months. When the undersetting of the cliff is completed the account will be properly audited, and a statement sent to each of those who have so kindly assisted in the good work, which is now so nearly completed; and all persons interested in the opening of the new house are earnestly requested to assist carrying the matter to a successful issue.

— Shields Daily News 14 October 1879, "A SHORT ACCOUNT OF THE ORIGIN AND OBJECT OF CULLERCOATS LIFE BRIGADE HOUSE"

== Cullercoats NAVTEX transmissions ==
Cullercoats is the base from which NAVTEX transmissions for the western North Sea area are broadcast. For the purpose of extended Shipping Forecasts, the Met Office uses Cullercoats as the name of the forecast area covering the North Sea between Fair Isle and Dover.
