= Lewis & Co =

Lewis and Company was a firm of organ builders founded by Thomas Christopher Lewis (1833–1915), one of the leading organ builders of late 19th-century Britain.

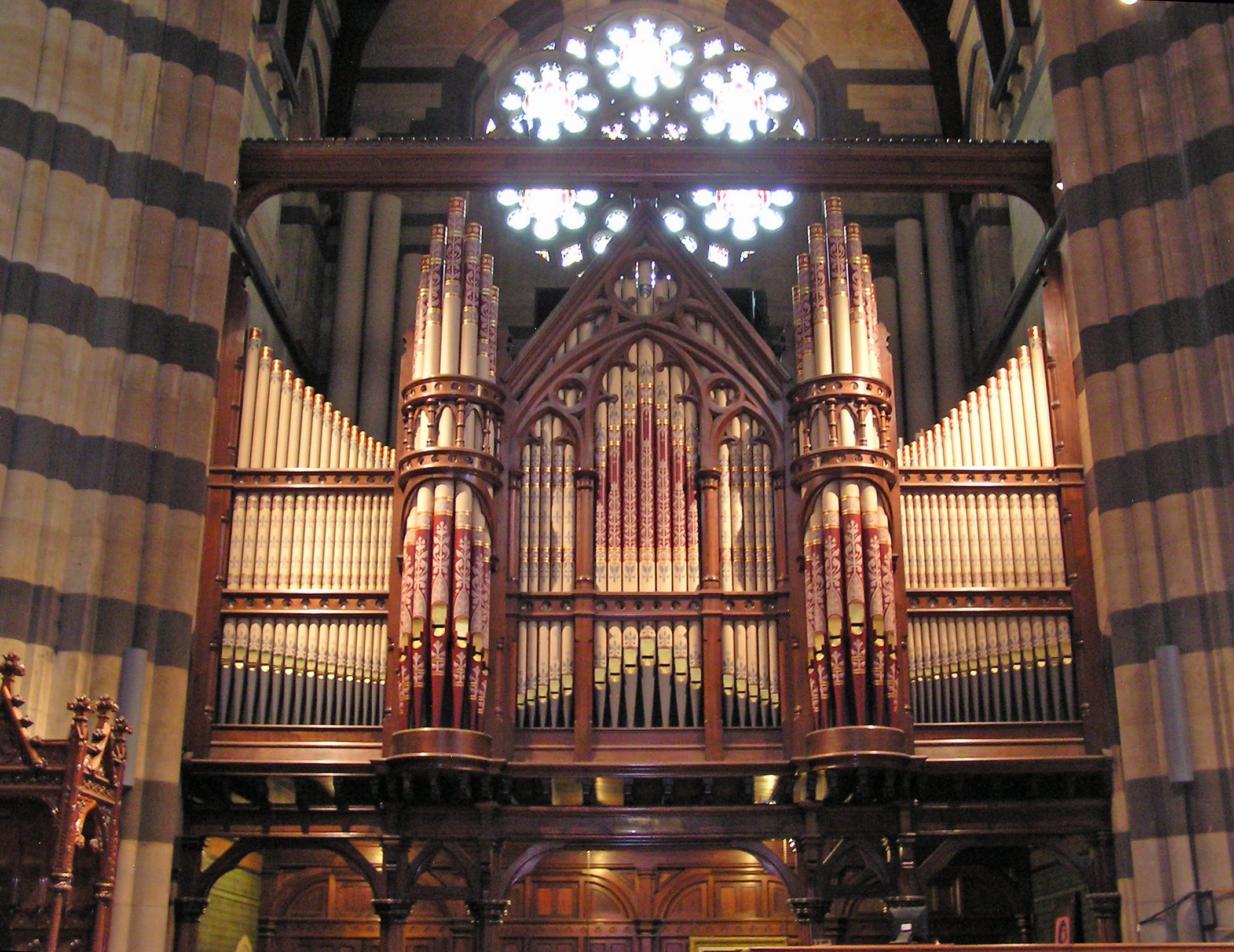
Lewis Organ in St Paul's Melbourne

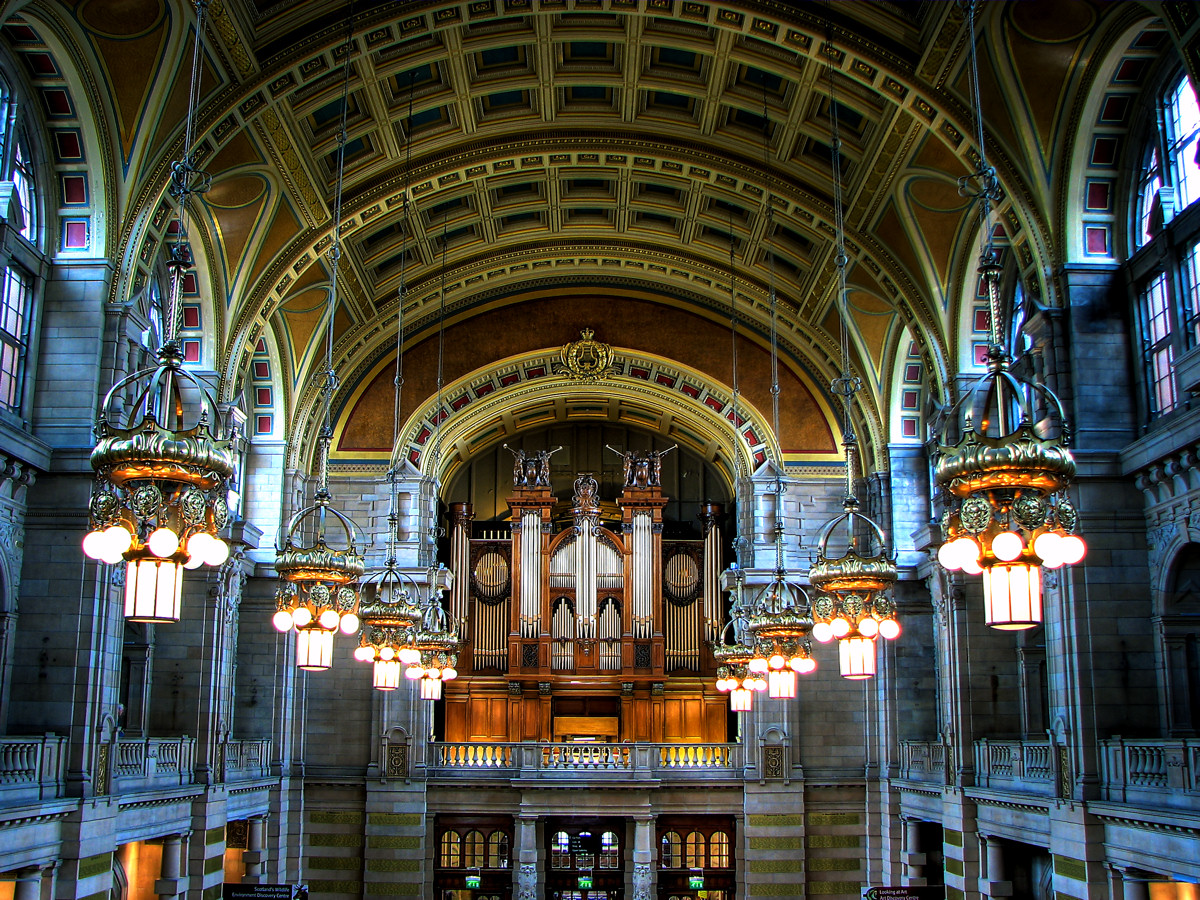
Lewis Organ in Glasgow's Kelvingrove Art Gallery and Museum

Born in London in 1833, the son of Thomas Archdeacon Lewis (1780–1862), a secretary to Charles Blomfield, Bishop of London. Although trained as an architect, Lewis founded a firm of organ builders with John Tunstall and John Whitacker in about 1860. In 1866, the firm moved into premises in Shepherds Lane (now Ferndale Road), Brixton. Under Lewis's direction, the firm built instruments ranging from small chamber organs to major cathedral and concert organs. Lewis was strongly inspired by the organs built in Germany by Edmund Schulze and in France by Aristide Cavaillé-Coll. He was renowned for instruments that had a bright, vibrant tone. Lewis left the firm before 1900, but it continued to maintain the standards set by its founder. In 1919, there was a merger with Henry Willis & Sons who moved into the Brixton works and traded as Henry Willis and Son and Lewis and Company Ltd until 1925 when the Lewis name was dropped. T. C. Lewis continued to build organs for some time after leaving the firm that he had founded.

Pre-1886 Lewis & Co had a well respected foreman, George Henry Adams (1843–1932), working for them, who worked on many of the Lewis organs, called. He had previously worked for around 20 years with J. W. Walker. A man called Thynne was dismissed (most likely) from Lewis's in 1881 and when he and Michell set up their short-lived company they managed to persuade a good number of Lewis staff, including his foreman, George Adams to defect to them. In 1886 George Adams established Adams & Marshall and by 1888 he was head of his own company, Adams & Son, which also worked out of Brixton. One surviving Adams & Son organ can be found in East Farleigh Church, in Kent. The instrument has a preservation order on it.

== Notable Lewis organs ==
- Old St. Paul's, Wellington, New Zealand, 1877
- Ripon Cathedral, 1878
- Newcastle Cathedral, 1880
- St John the Evangelist, Upper Norwood, London 1882
- St John's Presbyterian Church, Willis Street, Wellington 1886
- St Paul's Cathedral, Melbourne, Australia 1891
- Southwark Cathedral, London 1897
- Kelvingrove Art Gallery and Museum, Glasgow 1901
- Church House (Presbyterian Church in Ireland), Belfast 1906
- Westminster Cathedral, London, "Apse organ" 1910
- All Saints Church, Maidstone, "Main Organ" 1880
- St George's, Cullercoats, Tyne and Wear 1885
