= Marden, Tyne and Wear =

Urban area in North Tyneside, UK

Coordinates: 55.028°N 1.447°W

Marden is an urban area between the towns of North Shields and Cullercoats in Tyne & Wear. It consists of a housing estate built in the 20th century. St Hilda's Church (Church of England) is in Marden, and has existed since 1955, moving to its current site in 1966. The area has a secondary school, Marden High School on Hartington Road.
