= The Cullercoats Fish Lass =

Song written by Edward Corvan

Song
- Language: English (Geordie)
- Written: 1862
- Published: 1862
- Composer(s): Unknown
- Lyricist(s): Edward Corvan

"The Cullercoats Fish Lass" is a folk song, written by Edward Corvan, originally printed as a broadside in 1862 and collated in Allan's Illustrated Edition of Tyneside Songs and Readings in 1891.

Fish Lass is a Geordie term for a fishwife. The Cullercoats Fish Lass was a term for a fishwife from Cullercoats, a small fishing village near the mouth of the Tyne. The Cullercoats Fish Lass was popular with locals and tourists alike.

Jean F Terry wrote, in 1913, "The Cullercoats fishwife, with her cheerful weather-bronzed face, her short jacket and ample skirts of blue flannel, and her heavily laden "creel" of fish is not only appreciated by the brotherhood of brush and pencil, but is one of the notable sights of the district".

== Performances ==
The song was very popular in its day and was probably performed by the composer, Ned Corvan, in drag. Almost all of Corvan's works are examples of the traditional dialect of Tyneside (known as Geordie) in the mid-19th century.

Ned Corvan, as he was known, was a popular music hall performer, renowned for concerts and venues "of the free and easy type...not specially noted for their refinement".

There are two tunes associated with the song, The German Song and Lilla's a Lady.

The song provides part of the soundtrack for The Cullercoats Fish Lass, a film by the film company ACT 2 CAM. The film premiered in November 2013

== Lyrics ==
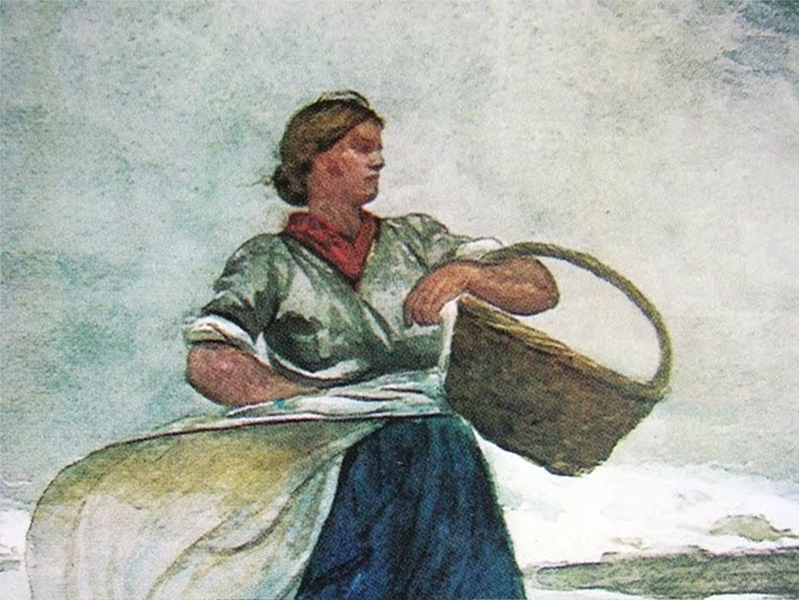
Detail of a Cullercoats Fishlass, from Inside the Bar, by Winslow Homer 1883.

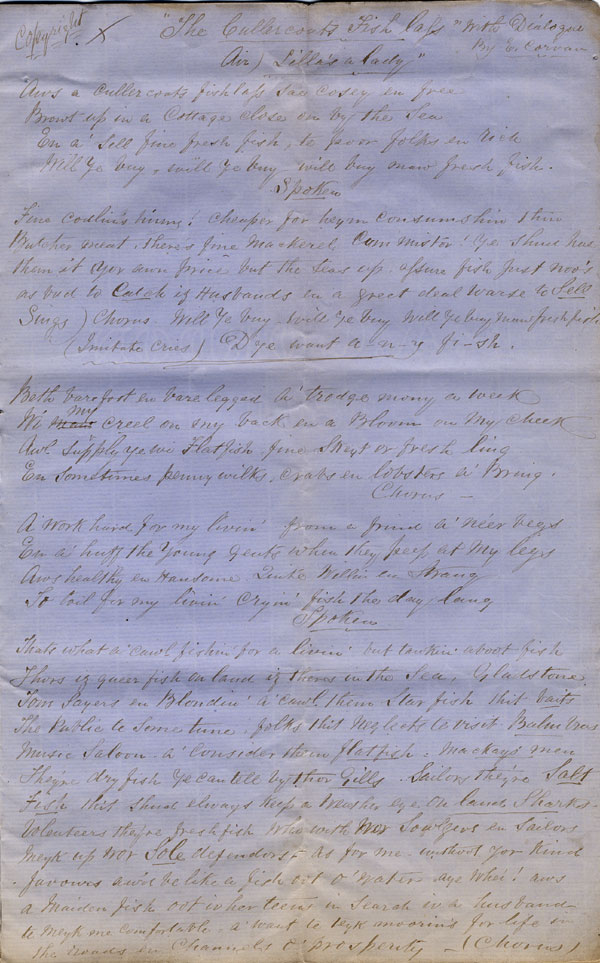
Hand written lyrics of "The Cullercoats Fishlass", by Ned Corvan, 1862.

Verse:
Aw's a Cullercoats fish-lass, se cozy an' free
Browt up in a cottage close on by the sea;
An' aw sell fine fresh fish ti poor an' ti rich--
Chorus:
Will ye buy, will ye buy, will ye buy maw fresh fish?

Spoken:
Finne codlin's hinny; cheaper for hyem consumption thin butcher
meat. There's fine mackerel. come. Mistor, ye shall hae them at
yor awn price, but the sea's up. Aw's sure, fish just noo's as
bad to catch iz husbands; and a greet deal warse ti sell.
Sings chorus:
Will ye buy, will ye buy, will ye buy my fresh fish?

Imitate cries:
D'ye want a-n-y fish?

Verse:
Byeth barefoot and barelegged aw trudge mony a week,
Wi' a creel on mee back an' a bloom on mee cheek;
Aw'll supply ye wi' flat fish, fine skyet, or fresh ling,
And sometimes pennywilks, crabs, an' lobsters aw bring.
Chorus:
Will ye buy, will ye buy? etc.

Verse:
Aw work hard for mee livin', frev a frind aw ne'er begs,
An' aw huff the young gents when they peep at my legs;
Aw's hilthy an' hansom, quite willin' and strong,
To toil for my livin', cryin' fish the day long.

Spoken:
That's what aw cawl fishin' for a livin'. But tawkin'
aboot fish, thor's as queer fish on land as there's in the sea--
Gladstone, Tom Sayers, and Blondin-aw cawl them star-fish,
that baits the public ti sum tuin. Folks that neglects to visit
Balmbra's Music Saloon, aw consider them flat-fish. Mackey's
men they're dry fish; ye can tell by their gills. Sailors, they're
salt fish, that shund always keep a wether eye on land-sharks.
Volunteers, they're fresh fish, who, with wor sowigers and sailors, myek
up wor sole defenders. As for me, with yor kind favours, aw'd be like a fish
oot o' wetter-aye, whei! Aw's a maiden fish oot iv her teens
in sairch ov a husband to myek me comfortable. Aw want ti teyk
moorins for life in the roads an' channels o' matrimony.
Sings chorus:
Will ye buy, will ye buy? etc.

Tune: "Lilla's a Lady"/"Lilie's a Lady"
