= Blaydon Races =

Traditional song performed by George "Geordie" Ridley

Song by George Ridley
- Language: English (Geordie)
- Written: 1862
- Published: c. 1863
- Songwriter: Geordie Ridley

"Blaydon Races" (Roud #3511) is a Geordie folk song of 1862, with lyric by George Ridley written in a style deriving from music hall. It celebrates the horse races held at Blaydon in North East England that year, although mostly composed in advance of the event. The words were inspired by the American ballad "On the Road to Brighton" (in Massachusetts), to the tune of which they are set. The song has become a local anthem, and is frequently sung by supporters of Newcastle United Football Club, Newcastle Red Bulls rugby club, and Durham County Cricket Club.

== History ==
=== The races ===
Now part of Gateshead, the former village of Blaydon lies on the south bank of the River Tyne about 4 miles (6.4 km) west of Newcastle upon Tyne, from where the song describes a horse-drawn omnibus journey to the annual races. Although obscure in origin, these were of some antiquity and had been mentioned in a song dating from around 1830. Prior to 1860, they had not been held for more than two decades due to the building of the Newcastle & Carlisle Railway, which cut across the original course. In 1862, as in the previous two years, they were held just north of Blaydon on an island in the river Tyne called Dent's Meadows. The revival lasted only until 1865, but the races began again in 1889 at a new course on Stella Haughs. The final meeting on 1–2 September 1916 was abandoned on the second day, after serious rioting followed the disqualification of the even money favourite and popular winner of the opening race, Anxious Moments, which had apparently been the target of foul play.

=== The song ===
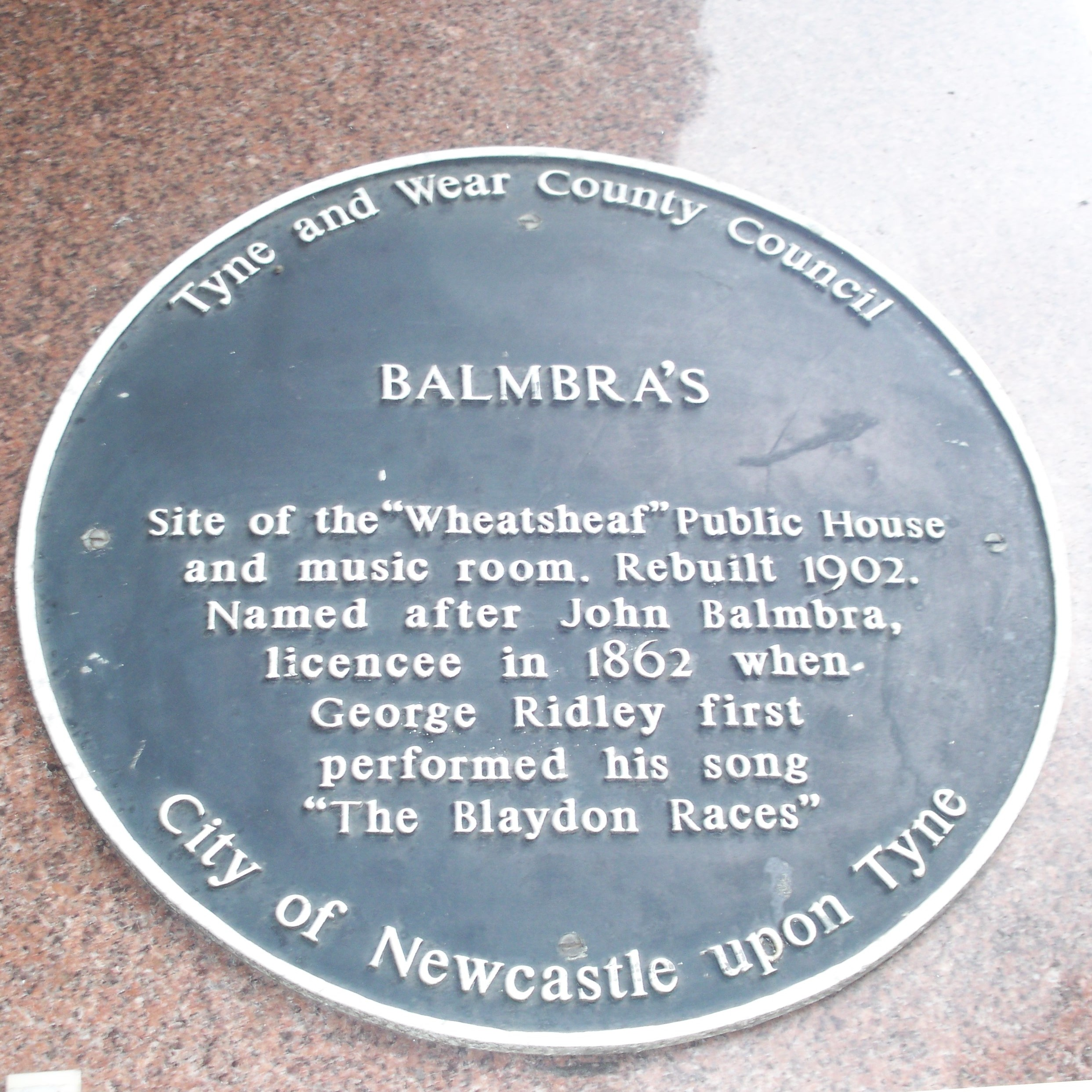
Site of the "Wheatsheaf" Public House and music room where the song was first sung

Of the 19 songs known to have been written by Ridley, all 16 to survive concern local people and events. Like "Cushie Butterfield", which was a parody of Harry Clifton's "Polly Perkins", they were often based on existing popular songs. The lyrics of "Blaydon Races" were set to a tune labelled "Brighton" in early publications. This refers to "On the Road to Brighton", an American blackface minstrelsy "sleighing song" of 1858, with words and music by Lon Morris. Minstrel shows had become highly popular in Britain from the 1840s onwards, and numerous references to them can be found in contemporary local newspapers. Ridley first performed his song at a testimonial concert for local oarsman John H. Clasper, held in Balmbra's Music Hall on 5 June 1862. The final verse was added for a concert given on the evening of 9 June at Whickham Mechanics' Institute in Blaydon, where it was reported by the local press that Ridley's "local songs" were received "with great applause".

Although the account of the trip to Blaydon is fictional, the heavy rain was noted in the Newcastle Daily Chronicle, as were the missing "cuddy" (horses). These were unable to ford the river due to an unexpected rise in the water level, meaning that only one horse was present when racing was scheduled to begin. Some spectators from Newcastle arrived by train, whilst others were conveyed by two omnibus companies, which the same newspaper observed "might harness better cattle if they wish to assure passengers of the safety of their means of transport".

== Lyrics and music ==
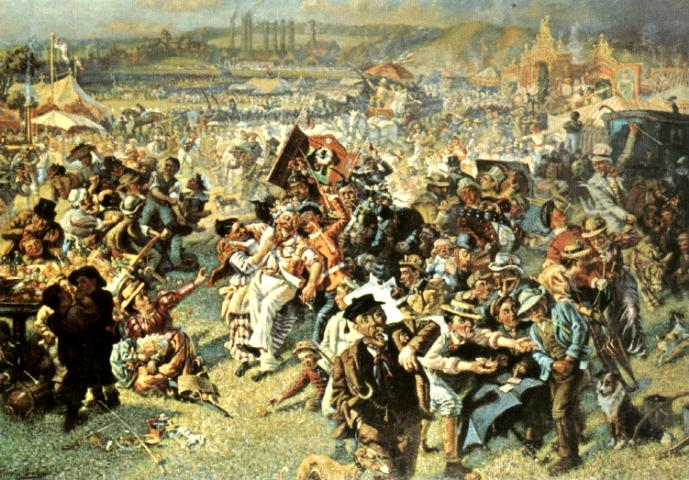
William Irving's 1903 painting

=== Lyrics ===
The song is quoted from the author's manuscript in Allan's Tyneside Songs of 1891:

Aa went to Blaydon Races, 'twas on the ninth of Joon,
Eiteen hundred an' sixty-two, on a summer's efternoon;
Aa tyuk the 'bus frae Balmbra's, an' she wis heavy laden,
Away we went 'lang Collin'wood Street, that's on the road to Blaydon.

Chorus:
Ah me lads, ye shudda seen wi gannin',
We pass'd the foaks alang the road just as they wor stannin';
Thor wis lots o' lads an' lassies there, aal wi' smiling faces,
Gannin' alang the Scotswood Road, to see the Blaydon Races.

(chorus)

We flew past Airmstrang's factory, and up to the "Robin Adair",
Just gannin' doon te the railway bridge, the 'bus wheel flew off there.
The lassies lost their crinolines off, an' the veils that hide their faces,
An' aw got two black eyes an' a broken nose gannin' te Blaydon Races.

(chorus)

When we gat the wheel put on away we went agyen,
But them that had their noses broke they cam back ower hyem;
Sum went to the Dispensary an' uthers to Doctor Gibbs,
An' sum sought out the Infirmary to mend their broken ribs.

(chorus)

Noo when we gat to Paradise thor wes bonny gam begun;
Thor was fower-an-twenty on the 'bus, man, hoo they danced an' sung;
They called on me to sing a sang, aa sung them "Paddy Fagan",
Aa danced a jig an' swung my twig that day aa went to Blaydon.

(chorus)

We flew across the Chain Bridge reet into Blaydon toon,
The bellman he was callin' there, they call him Jackie Broon;
Aa saw him talkin' to sum cheps, an' them he was pursuadin'
To gan an' see Geordy Ridley's concert in the Mechanics' Hall at Blaydon.

(chorus)

The rain it poor'd aall the day an' mayed the groons quite muddy,
Coffy Johnny had a white hat on – they war shootin' "Whe stole the cuddy."
There wis spice stalls an' munkey shows an' aud wives selling ciders,
An' a chep wiv a hapenny roond aboot, shootin' "Noo, me lads, for riders."

(chorus)

As in the following example, the song is now usually sung with more modern language, but retaining something of the Tyneside dialect:

Oh me lads, you should've seen us gannin'
Passing the folks along the road
just as they were stannin'
Aal the lads and lasses there
aal wi' smilin' faces
Gannin along the Scotswood Road
To see the Blaydon Races

=== Music ===
Tune: "Brighton".

== Places and people mentioned ==
=== Places ===
"Scotswood Road" was and still is a long road parallel to the left bank of the river Tyne, running eastwards from Scotswood and Benwell to Newcastle city, and which at the time of the song ran through industrial and working-class areas.

"Airmstrang's factory" was a large engineering works at Elswick, which made large guns and other firearms. Construction work on the six-acre site started in April 1847, and the number of employees engaged in manufacturing grew from 20 in December 1847 to around 250 by the end of 1850.

Lying just outside the 1862 town boundary on the south side of Scotswood Road, the "Robin Adair" was a pub named after a popular song and air, written about 1750, concerning the surgeon Robert Adair. The building had been demolished by December 1965, when another establishment of the same name was opened by T. Dan Smith, leader of Newcastle City Council. Less than 25 years later, this was standing unused and reported to be in a dilapidated condition following a fire.

Paradise was a small village to the west of Armstrong's factory. On the south side of Scotswood Road and adjacent Newcastle & Carlisle Railway were smallholdings and Paradise House. On the north side were a Methodist chapel and the houses of Paradise Row, although as these lay between Benwell Colliery (West Pit) and Benwell Brickworks, it has been noted the location "probably did not live up to its name".

Before Newcastle Dispensary opened in October 1777, medical care in Newcastle was considered so rudimentary that travellers were advised to avoid the town. Located initially at the foot of The Side, it moved to Pilgrim Street in 1780, Low Friar Street in 1790, and in 1828 to a building designed by Richard Grainger in Nelson Street. It relocated to New Bridge Street in 1928, and continued to operate outside the National Health Service until its closure on 30 June 1976 due to lack of funds.

Newcastle Infirmary began admitting patients on 23 May 1751, although housed in temporary premises at Gallowgate whilst a new building was constructed at Forth Banks. Located to the west of Newcastle railway station on land made available by Newcastle Corporation, this opened on 8 October 1753. It remained in use until September 1906, when patients were transferred to the Royal Victoria Infirmary following its opening by King Edward VII on 11 July. Most of the old infirmary buildings were demolished in 1954.

Three miles west of Newcastle, the old Scotswood Bridge over the Tyne opened on 12 May 1831. Designed by John Green and known locally as the "Chain Bridge", a toll was payable to cross until 18 March 1907. It was used until 20 March 1967, when the present Scotswood Bridge opened, 140 feet (43 m) further upstream.

=== People ===
Dr Charles John Gibb (1824–1900) was probably the most widely known doctor in Newcastle in 1862, having played a prominent role in combatting the town's cholera epidemic of 1853. He did much to help the poor, and in an emergency would sometimes charter a train to transport one of his wealthy rural patients. Between 1855 and 1870, he was an honorary surgeon at the Newcastle Infirmary.

"Jackie Broon" was the Blaydon town crier, whose bell is now preserved in Newcastle's Discovery Museum.

"Coffy Johnny" was in reality an ex-blacksmith from Winlaton named John Oliver (1828–1900). A well-known character who attended all local race meetings, he would have stood out to racegoers due to the white top hat he wore on special occasions, and the fact that he was over six and a half feet (1.98 m) tall. His nickname derived from his habit of asking people to wait while he finished his coffee before getting on with whatever job was at hand.

== Anniversary celebrations ==
=== Centenary ===
Events marking the centenary of the 1862 races were held on Tyneside from 2 – 9 June 1962, with a budget of £21,000 allocated by Newcastle Corporation. At the invitation of T. Dan Smith, they were attended by Labour Party leader Hugh Gaitskell, who travelled in a procession on 9 June retracing the journey described in Ridley's song.

=== 150th Anniversary ===
In December 2010 an online petition was launched calling for "...a clear and sustained commitment on the part of Newcastle upon Tyne and Gateshead Councils to work hand-in-hand with the Geordie people...to help deliver an appropriate celebration of the 150th anniversary of Mr George Ridley's world-famous anthem of Tyneside." On 9 November 2011, Chi Onwurah MP presented a parliamentary petition to the Speaker of the House of Commons in support of the campaign. From August 2011, campaign group members were in discussions with the two councils. As a result of these discussions, the core campaign objective of delivering an on-street event on the actual anniversary of 9 June 2012 was achieved. A series of additional "satellite" events were also organised including a week-long beer festival at The Hotspur pub, Percy Street, Newcastle upon Tyne on the night of 9 June 2012.. In London a well attended day long event involving folk singers was organised in pubs The Betsey Trotwood and Gunmakers.

In a ceremony at Newcastle railway station on 6 June 2012 attended by former Newcastle United footballer Alan Shearer, a class 91 locomotive operated by East Coast was named "Blaydon Races".

== Modern race ==
The Blaydon Race is a 5.9-mile athletics race from Newcastle to Blaydon that takes place on 9 June every year and starts off with the singing of 'The Blaydon Races', as the words are used as the basis for the whole race.

== Other uses ==
- "Blaydon Races" is often used as a chant by supporters of Newcastle United Football Club, by whom it was sung repeatedly at the 1974 FA Cup final.
- In the late nineteenth century, the tune was adopted as a march by soldiers of the British Army's Fifth Foot infantry regiment (The Royal Northumberland Fusiliers), of Fenham Barracks, Newcastle upon Tyne. Today it is the Regimental Song of The Royal Regiment of Fusiliers, the modern descendants of The Royal Northumberland Fusiliers. The song was also adopted by the Durham Light Infantry.
- In November 2009 a charity version of 'Blaydon Races' was recorded by Jimmy Nail, Kevin Whately and Tim Healy, from the cast of Auf Wiedersehen, Pet, in aid of the Sir Bobby Robson Foundation, featuring an additional verse about him.
- William Irving's 1903 painting. 'The Blaydon Races – A Study from Life' is on show at the Shipley Art Gallery in Gateshead. The painting depicts the fairground festivities associated with the race.

== Recordings ==
- Friends of Fiddler's Green on The Road to Mandalay, 1994
- Bob Davenport and The Marsden Rattlers, released in 1971 on "BBC's Folk on 2 presents Northumbrian Folk" (BBC Records REC 118S [LP, UK, 1971])
- In the opening scenes of The Lone Ranger (2013) the tune playing in the background on an organ is "On the Road to Brighton", known in the UK as the song "The Blaydon Races"
- Recorded by Minnie Birch on You're Not Singing Anymore, an EP of folk football songs
- American Celtic punk band, The Vandon Arms, on The Sent Off EP, from 2010
- 2025 post apocalyptic horror movie 28 Years Later, performed by Ruairidh Maclean & Ruairidh Graham

== See also ==
- Geordie dialect words
