= Harry Clifton (singer) =

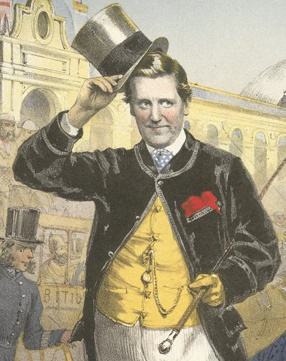
- 1863 illustration of Clifton

Background information
- Born: Henry Robert Clifton; 1832; Hoddesdon, Hertfordshire, England
- Died: 15 July 1872 (aged 40) Shepherd's Bush, London, England
- Genres: Music hall
- Occupations: Singer, songwriter
- Years active: 1850s–1872

Henry Robert Clifton (baptised 20 May 1832 – 15 July 1872) was an English music hall singer, songwriter and entertainer. A prolific composer in the popular genre, his most successful song was "Pretty Polly Perkins of Paddington Green".

== Biography ==
The son of a carpenter, Clifton was born in Hoddesdon, Hertfordshire. He was orphaned as a child, and little is known of his early adulthood. By the early 1860s he had become well known as a singer and songwriter in the song and supper rooms and early music halls of London. Nicknamed "Handsome Harry Clifton" during his career, his repertoire included comic songs, Irish songs, and "motto songs", with an improving moral message, such as "Paddle Your Own Canoe" (1864).

Clifton's songs were described as "equally popular and acceptable in the drawing-rooms of the rich as in the cottages of the poor". Many taught a moral lesson; for example, "Pretty Polly Perkins", published in 1863, was about the pitfalls of pride and vanity. He wrote his own lyrics. Although some of his songs relied on tunes by composers such as Charles Coote, most adapted their tunes from old folk songs. Other songs included "The Dark Girl Dress'd in Blue", "There's Nothing Succeeds Like Success", "It's Better to Laugh Than to Cry", and "Work, Boys, Work, and Be Contented!".

A list of songs for sale held at the British Library names fifteen songs by Harry Clifton, described as "without exception, the best comic songs of the day". Lithographs of several of his other songs are also held in the British Library online archive, including "The Dark Girl Dress'd in Blue" (which has a colour portrait of Clifton on the front page), "Isabella, The Barber's Daughter" and "The Railway Bell(e)".

Clifton undertook a nationwide tour between 1865 and 1867, with his own Cosmopolitan Concert Company, and for some years lived in Glasgow. He was married and had one child, Fanny Alice, who died aged six months. He died aged 40 in Shepherd's Bush, London, and is buried in Kensal Green Cemetery.

One of his obituaries stated: "The popularity which his songs attained is best denoted by the fact that even now they are whistled by every street-boy, played by every barrel organ and sung in every town and hamlet in the United Kingdom." The critic Peter Gammond describes Clifton as "one of the great pioneers of music-hall song." Clifton's work survives (in an adapted form) into the present day, as the Tyneside music hall song "Cushie Butterfield" (still sung at Newcastle United matches) is sung to the same tune as "Pretty Polly Perkins" and is a parody of it.
