= Pretty Polly Perkins of Paddington Green =

Song

Song
- Published: 1864
- Genre: Music hall
- Songwriter: Harry Clifton

"Pretty Polly Perkins of Paddington Green" is the title of an English song, composed by the London music hall and broadside songwriter Harry Clifton (1832–1872), and first published in 1864. It is catalogued as Roud Folk Song Index No. 430.

It was originally published under the title Polly Perkins of Paddington Green or the Broken Hearted Milkman.

== History ==
It was almost universally known in England until around the mid-1950s, when it began to fade as being too old-fashioned. The title refers to the district of Paddington in London. The song gained a place in the canonical Oxford Book of Comic Verse, and the original manuscript of "Polly" is now held in the Bodleian Library.

It was adapted for the USA by Clifton during the American Civil War, retitled "Polly Perkins of Abington Green". Presumably the new title referred to Abington Green, Georgia, in the United States. It was also published fairly early in its existence as "Pretty Polly Perkins of Pemberton Green".

Most of Clifton's songs adapted their tunes from old folk songs and it is possible that a folk tune is also the origin of the tune for Polly—some see a resemblance to "Nightingales Sing", also known as "The Bold Grenadier". The famous Tyneside Music Hall song Cushie Butterfield (sung even today at Newcastle United matches) is sung to the same tune as "Polly" and is a parody of "Polly". Cushie Butterfield is attributed to the great Geordie comic singer George Ridley, who died in 1864; "Cushie" was first published in book form in the 1873 edition of "Allan's Tyneside Songs". Clifton's death date means that both the song and its tune are now firmly in the public domain.

The tune, with new lyrics, found its way into the Australian bush culture, among outback farmers and sheep shearers, in the song "One of the Has-beens".

In the British Royal Navy, and in the Royal Australian Navy, sailors with a surname of Perkins are traditionally given the nickname of 'Polly'.

The chorus of the song is sung by the feverish Sergeant Maxfield in the 1964 film Zulu (1964 film).

The chorus of the song is also sung by Perks the station porter in the 1970 film The Railway Children.

The song is also sung by Roy Hudd in true music hall fashion on BBC TV's The Good Old Days, with the audience at the City Varieties Theatre, Leeds.

The name Polly Perkins is that of the heroine in the movie Sky Captain and the World of Tomorrow.

In John Mortimer's A Voyage Round My Father, it is the favourite song of the narrator's father, who sings snatches of it on the most inappropriate occasions.

== Lyrics ==
I am a broken-hearted milkman, in grief I'm arrayed
Through keeping of the company of a young servant maid
Who lived on board and wages, the house to keep clean
In a gentleman's family near Paddington Green

She was as beautiful as a butterfly and proud as a Queen
Was pretty little Polly Perkins of Paddington Green

She'd an ankle like an antelope and a step like a deer
A voice like a blackbird, so mellow and clear
Her hair hung in ringlets so beautiful and long
I thought that she loved me but I found I was wrong

[Alternative and possibly original/earlier lyrics to second verse]
Her eyes were as black as the pips of a pear
No rose in the garden with her cheeks could compare
Her hair hung in ringlets so beautiful and long
I thought that she loved me but I found I was wrong

Refrain

When I'd rattle in the morning and cry "Milk below"
At the sound of my milk cans her face she did show
With a smile upon her countenance and a laugh in her eye
If I'd thought that she loved me I'd have laid down to die

Refrain

When I asked her to marry me, she said "Oh what stuff"
And told me to stop it for she'd had quite enough
Of my nonsense... At the same time, I'd been very kind
But to marry a milkman she didn't feel inclined

Refrain

"The man that has me must have silver and gold
A chariot to ride in and be handsome and bold
His hair must be curly as any watch-spring,
And his whiskers as big as a brush for clothing"

Refrain

The words that she uttered went straight through my heart
I sobbed and I sighed, and I straight did depart
With a tear on my eyelid as big as a bean
I bid farewell to Polly and to Paddington Green

Refrain

In six months she married, this hard-hearted girl
But it was not a viscount, and it was not an earl
It was not a baronite, but a shade or two worse
It was a bow-legged conductor of a tuppenny bus

Refrain
