= Balmbra's Music Hall =

Coordinates: 54.9707°N 1.6118°W

Balmbra's Music Hall was an early Music Hall in the centre of Newcastle, England, in the middle of the 19th century.

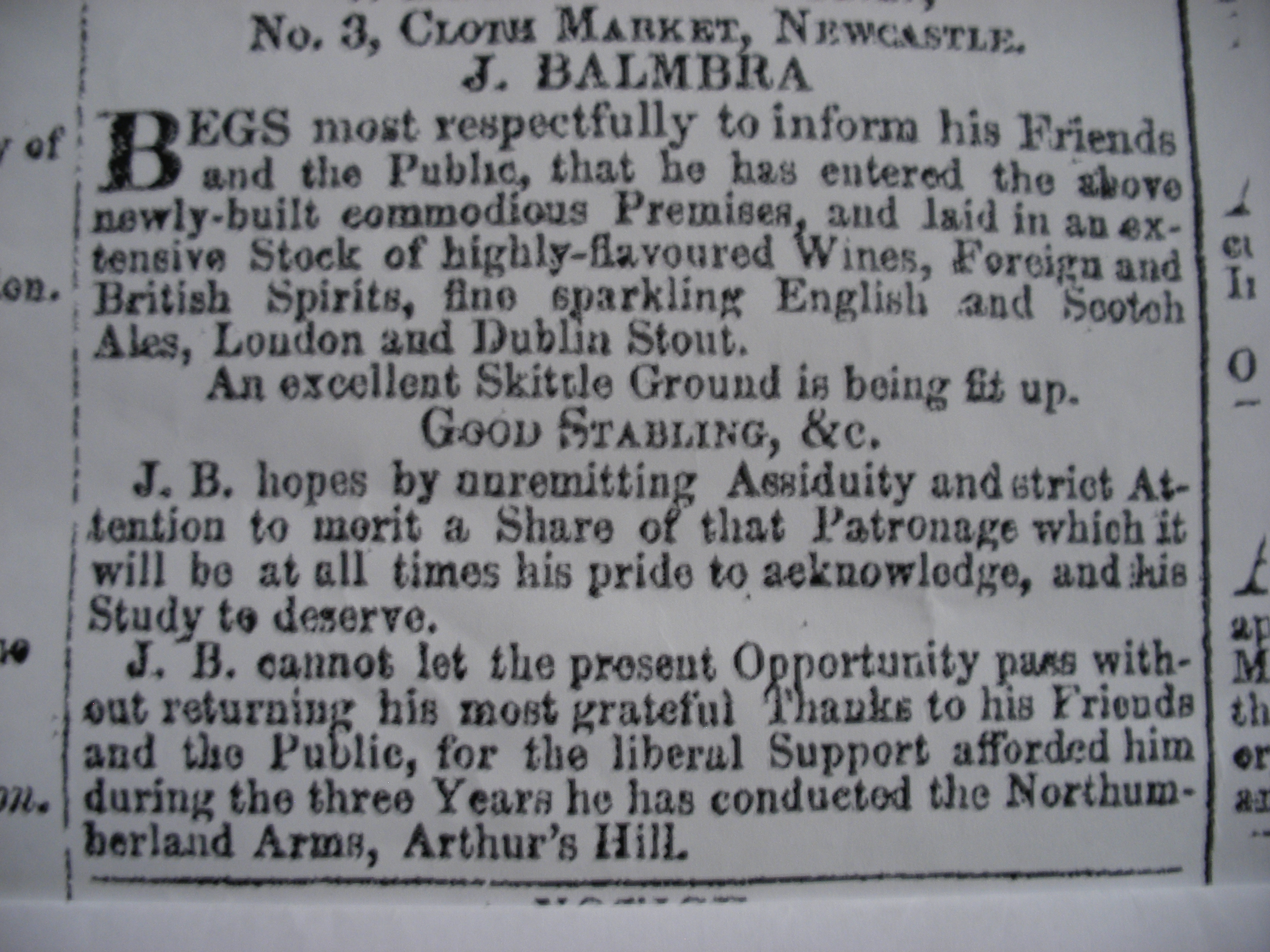
An advertisement for Balmbras music hall in Newcastle from the Newcastle Courant November 27th 1840 when Balmbras was first opened

== History ==
In about 1848 a first floor room of the Wheatsheaf Public House at 6 Cloth Market, Newcastle, was opened and in later advertisements was called "The Royal Music Saloon" (this name appears in advertisements dated 1859).

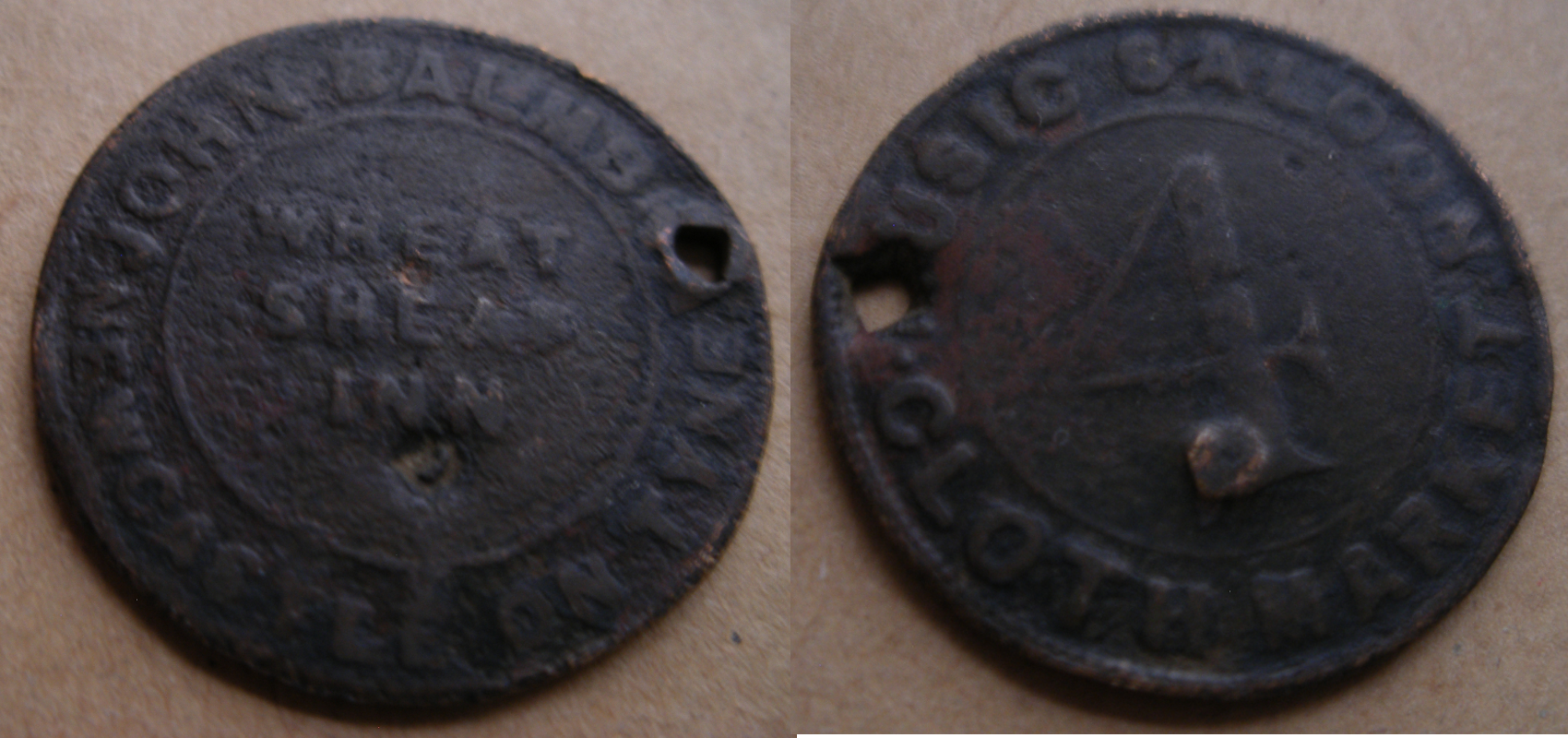
A token to gain entry to Balmbras music hall in Newcastle

Around 1862, the room was rebuilt/converted, and the proprietor at this time was John Balmbra. It was here that the song "Blaydon Races" was first performed by George "Geordie" Ridley in 1862, The song referring to the Music Hall by name, as the starting point of the trip - "I took the bus from Balmbra's and she was heavy-laden, Away we went along Collingwood Street, that’s on the road to Blaydon."”

In 1864 The Wheatsheaf was taken on by Mr T Handford. Thomas Handford (1835-1876) and his elder brother, Henry (1829-1888), blackface artistes, were the sons of John Handford (b.1801), who in 1841 was the licensee of The Green Man in Jackson’s Row, Manchester. In May 1856, or thereabouts, the Brothers Handford, as they were known, worked a six-month engagement in the Saloon at the Wheatsheaf with John Balmbra who had been running the place since 1850, if not before. The Handfords took their customary, farewell benefit at which, 'The Era' reported on 9 November, ‘Mr Thos. Handford danced in a pair of splendid Morocco clogs the extraordinary number of 150 steps, and was most rapturously encored.’ In 1857, the Handfords were back in harness at Balmbra's Wheatsheaf. On 11 October 'The Era' decided that they had ‘established themselves as public favourites, and appear to be the chief attraction.’ They took their benefit before a bumper house on 3 December 1857. In 1863 Balmbra, whose health was ailing, struck a deal with Tom Handford - now known as 'The Black Diamond' - to take on The Wheatsheaf for a year. It seems likely that John and Isabella Balmbra may have retired to Alnwick where Isabella Balmbra died in 1870, two years after her husband's death in Newcastle on 26 October 1868. Circumstances suggest that Handford took over on New Years Day 1864 and, by way of honouring his friend, he re-branded the Wheatsheaf as Balmbra's Music Hall. Balmbra's became home to Tom, his wife, Helen, his daughter, Catherine, and son, Thomas. On 24 January 1864 Handford put out a shout in 'The Era' for ‘BALMBRA’S CONCERT HALL - (Lessee, Mr Tom Handford.)’ where a host of talent was headed for ‘this old and favourite Music Hall’ including a ‘Mr J D Kelly (who appears in conjunction with Mr Handford in an excellent Negro extravaganza nightly).’

A number of civic events had been arranged in Newcastle to mark the 300th anniversary of the birth of Shakespeare on 26 April 1864 one of which, according to the 'Newcastle Chronicle' of 26th, suffered, due to the icy cold conditions in the Town Hall. The 'Newcastle Journal' picked up on the report the following day and pointed out that among the reviews of the 26th, lay a suggestion that the civic party would have been far better directed elsewhere. ‘Among those notices occurs the following modest paragraph which we venture to say is unique of its kind:- ‘ “The glories of the Wheat Sheaf Music Saloon have suffered no diminution under the management of Mr. Tom Handford, and comic and sentimental vocalisation, and some very clever clog-dancing, were appreciated by a full house.” Why did not the reporter who discovered the astounding success of “Mr. Tom Handford” rush off to the executive committee and announce the fact. With what haste would they have proceeded to the “Wheat Sheaf Music Saloon” and then and there engaged the “very clever clog dancers for the edification of the icy audience in the Town Hall who, at that stage of the proceedings, had probably begun to yawn and vote the whole thing a bore. Whilst we acknowledge the unequivocal success attained by Mr. Handford in his celebration of the Tercentenary, we must be permitted to express our deep regret that our Local Committee were not permitted to share in it. . . . Good people all, please to consider Shakespeare “celebrated” and your arduous labours at an end: for the future, regard yourselves as entirely free to exercise your little natural partialities, and to desert Hamlet and Othello for the more congenial “comic and sentimental vocalisation” of Mr. Handford, and the clever clog-dancing which you appreciate so highly.’

Having served time with John Balmbra and eased Tom through his early days in the Cloth Market, Balmbra’s right-hand man, a Mr J E Jones decided to call it a day. On 3 August 1864 the 'Newcastle Journal' reported that he was presented with ‘a massive gold chain and appendages’, presumably the gift of John Balmbra. ‘Likewise a splendid gold signet ring, by Mr. T. Handford, proprietor of the Wheat Sheaf Music Saloon, as a token of respect and esteem, and for his attention as manager and secretary to the establishment. The presentation was given by Mr. Handford himself; and in a few words, was suitably acknowledged by the recipient.’

On Monday 17 October, as Handford's time at Balmbra's was coming to an end he persuaded his ailing wife to join him on stage. He placed a celebratory shout in the 'Newcastle Guardian and Tyne Mercury' on Saturday 15 October 1864. ‘Mrs Handford, The most accomplished Actress and Danseuse of the day’ was to appear alongside her husband, ‘The Great Black Diamond, in their Celebrated Drawing Room Entertainment.’ Handford's departure was noticed by 'The Era.' ‘The performances . . . under the management of Mr T Handford, concluded on Saturday evening, and on Monday the establishment opened under new Management, a very handsome new proscenium having been introduced, which gives the hall a very gay appearance.’ The hall had been taken on by Joshua L Bagnall and Walter William Blakey and was henceforth known as the Oxford Music Hall.

The name change appeared in adverts c1865, and new owner/managers in the form of Joshua L. Bagnall and Walter William Blakey. Adverts for the Music Hall appeared to cease c1879.

Details published at the time showed that the stage was only in the region of 5 feet (1.5m) deep from front to back and the gallery was modified into a showroom c1883.

Around 1891 reflected the end of the Music Hall heyday, the building becoming the "Oxford Restaurant and Public Hall". Unfortunately the building and its contents were completely destroyed by fire in 1899, by which time it was being used as a billiard hall. A new building, also containing a billiards room, was erected and opened 1901 as the “Carlton Hotel”.

In about 1962 it became "Balmbra's Music Hall" complete with balcony at one end, but it was a poor imitation of the famous mid-Victorian Venue.

A plaque commemorating the music hall has been placed on the building by Newcastle City Council
