= Edward Corvan =

Concert hall songwriter and performer (c. 1830 – 1865)

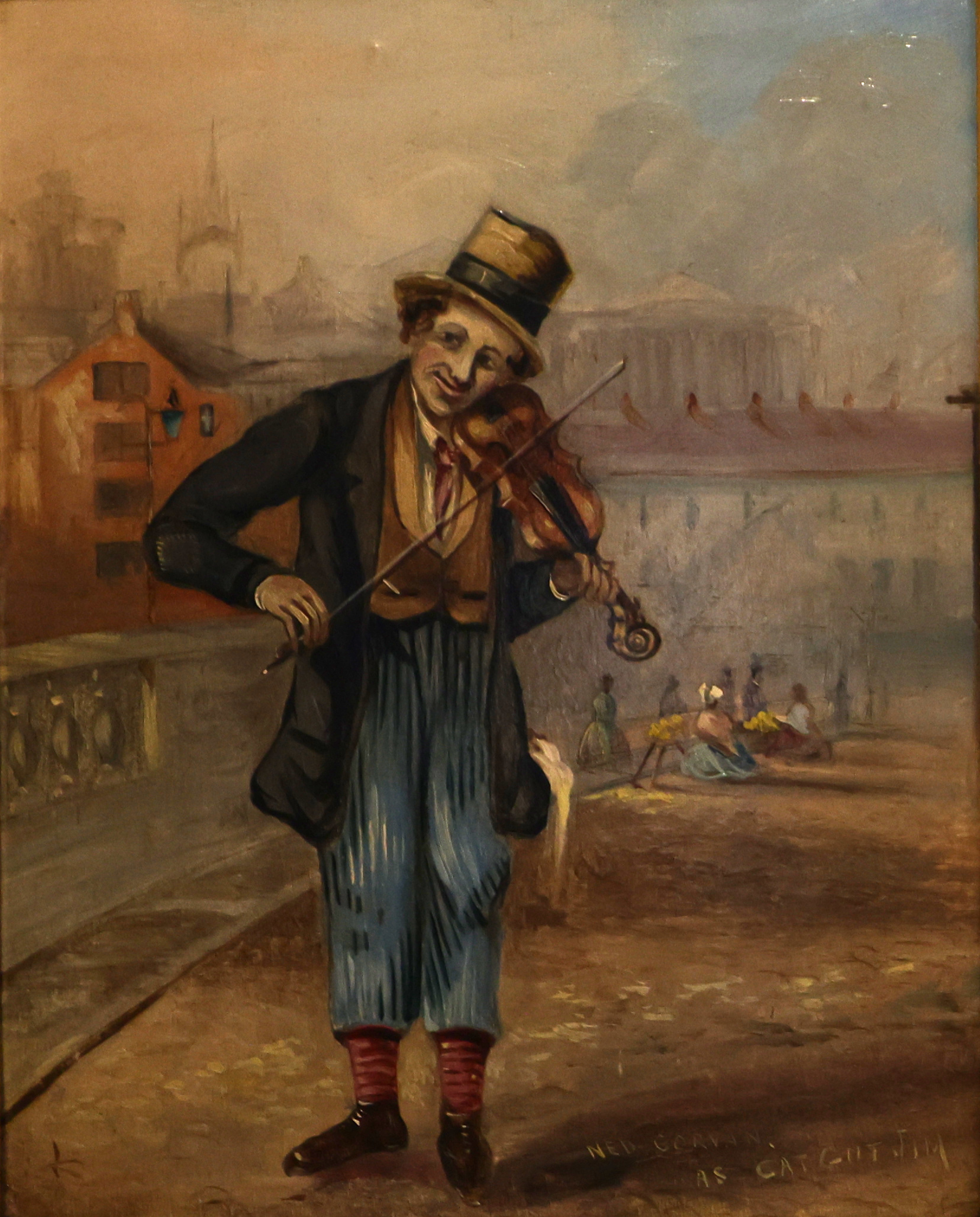
Self Portrait as Cat-gut Jim

Edward Corvan (c. 1830 – 1865) was a Tyneside concert hall songwriter and performer, and a contemporary of George "Geordie" Ridley. His songs were printed in a modified English orthography designed to represent the traditional dialect of Tyneside in the middle of the 19th century, and are examples of Dialect Literature.

== Biography ==
Corvan was born in Liverpool some time around 1830, but his family moved to Newcastle upon Tyne when he was four years old. His father died three years later.

Corvan was raised by his widowed mother who struggled to feed the family of four on her meagre earnings. After a brief career as a sail-maker Corvan joined Billy Purvis's Victoria Theatre. Here he tried his hand at a number of things, but found most success in the performance of local and comic songs. Ned then went on to join the Olympic where he enjoyed great success with songs such as "Astrilly". With this popularity he travelled the North singing his Tyneside songs, eventually settling in South Shields where he operated Corvan's Music Hall. After a number of years he gave up the establishment and returned to local singing.

Playing successfully at concerts "of the free and easy type ... not specially noted for their refinement", he was respected as "a really expert violinist" and "unequalled ... as a comic singer of local ditties".

He also "possessed very considerable gifts as an artist", often creating chalk likenesses of contemporary celebrities and local figures as part of his act.

Corvan sang about survival on the edge of poverty and other working class experiences. He supported the seamen's strike of 1851 and gave money from his performances to seafarers charities. He sang not only for workers, but also "on behalf of – and in effect, from within – that network of communities" from which he came, and with which he still felt an attachment.

Corvan was married to Isabella Arrowsmith and they had three children.

Corvan died of tuberculosis on 31 August 1865 at the age of 35.

== Works ==
Corvan's songs were published in four Song Books, a collection called Random Rhymes, in various Broadsides, and in editions of Allan's Illustrated Edition of Tyneside Songs and Readings.

=== Random Rhymes (1850) ===
- The Queen's Second Visit
- Billy Purvis turned Ranter Preacher
- The Curds and Cream-house Ghost
- He wad be a Noodle
- Yer Gannin to be a Keelman
- The Happy Keelman
- The rise in Baccy
- The Shades Saloon
- The Goose Club
- Bella Gray – A Parody on Rosa Lee
- O, maw bonnie Nannie O
- Parody on She Wore a Wreath of Roses
- Sweating System
- Tom Johnson
- Campbell's grand Saloon, North Shields
- The Folks of Aud Shields
- The New Mayor of South Shields
- South Shields Corporation
- Blyth in a Breeze

=== Broadsides (1850–1865) ===
- Warkworth Feast
- Toon Improvement Bill; or, Nee Pleyce Noo to Play
- The Sandgate Lass
- The Rise in Coals
- The Pitman and the Kippered Herrin'
- The Keel on Fire
- The Stage Struck Keelman
- Bella Gray
- Astrilly's Goold Fields; or, Tommy Carr's Letter
- The Unfortunate Man
- The Factory Lass or Pally Jones
- Swaggering at the Races
- He Wad Be a Noodle
- Trip to Marsden Rock
- Maw Stepmother or, Billy Bag the Glutton
- Days When I was Hard Up
- Hairy Gobs! an' Fine Moosecatchers!
- The Queen's Second Visit, or, The Openin' o' wor Greet Central Station
- Prince Alberts' Babby Hoose, or The Greet Exhibition of 1851
- The Cullercoats Fish-Wife
- £4. 10s. or, the Sailors' Strike
- The Funny Time Comin'

=== Corvan's Song Books (1857–1866) ===
Corvan's Song Book No. 1

- Swaggering at the Races
- The Keel on Fire
- The Rise in Coals
- Astrilly, or The Pitman's Farewell
- Nee Pleyce noo to Play
- The Pitman and the Kippered Herrin
- Warkworth Feast
- Astrilly's Goold Fields, or Tommy Carr's Letter
- The Unfortunate Man
- The Sandgate Lass
- Pally Jones the Factory Lass

Corvan's Song Book No. 2

- He wad be a Noodle
- Maw Step-Mother; or, Billy Bags the Glutton
- Days when I was Hard Up
- Tommy Carr's Adventures in Astrilly
- Deeth o' Billy Purvis
- Stage Struck Keelman
- Lads o' Tyneside
- Hairy Gobs an' fine Moosecatchers
- Trip to Marsden Rock
- Gallowgate Hoppin'

Corvan's Song Book No. 3

- Bella Gray
- The Queen's Second Visit
- Prince Albert's Babby Hoose; or, the Greet Exhibition of 1851
- The Cullercoats Fish-Wife
- Peep at Newcassel
- Widow Winks
- Snooks, the Artist
- O, ha'e ye seen wor Jimmy

Corvan's Song Book No. 4

- Newcassel Pluck, or Recruitin' for Delhi
- Soup Kitchen
- Gossipin' Nan Todds
- Perils of the Mine, or Collier's Death
- Sunday Mornin's Fuddle – a parody
- Work for One Thousand Men
- Jimmy Munro's Troubles
- Pea Straw
- Tom Sayers
- Bobby Walker's Visit to the Leviathan
- Our Mary Ann – a parody
- Sword Dancers' Lament

=== In Allan's Tyneside Songs ===
- The Caller
- He Wad Be a Noodle
- The Toon Improvement Bill, or, Ne Pleyce Noo te Play
- The Rise in Coals
- Asstrilly; or, The Pitman's Farewell
- Asstrilly's Goold Fields; or, Tommy Carr's Letter
- Tommy Carr's Adventures in Asstrilly
- The Cullercoats Fish-Wife
- Bobby the Boxer
- Warkworth Feast
- The Kipper'd Herrin'
- Deeth o' Billy Purvis
- The Greet Bull-dog o' Shields
- The Fishermen Hung the Monkey, O!
- The Comet; or, The Skipper's Fright
- The Fire on the Kee
- Chambers and White
- The Deeth o' Cuckoo Jack
- Wor Tyneside Champions
- The Queen Has Sent a Letter; or, The Hartley Calamity
- The Queen's Visit to Cherbourg
- Stage-struck Keelman
- The Soop Kithcin
- The High Level and the Aud Bridge
- Cat-gut Jim, The Fiddler
- (The Curds-and-Cream House Ghost)

=== Other ===
- Mally's Dream
- Tyne Lads For Ever!
- Jimmy McKenny

== Corvan's dialect ==
Although Corvan was not born a Geordie, he was considered "a consummate master of the patois of Tyneside". Almost all of Corvan's works are examples of the traditional dialect of Tyneside (known as Geordie) in the mid-19th century.
