= George "Geordie" Ridley =

Tyneside concert hall songwriter and performer

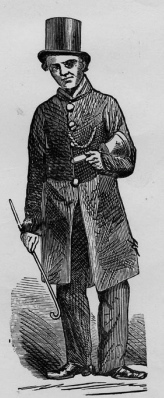
George "Geordie" Ridley

George "Geordie" Ridley (1835–1864) was a Tyneside concert hall songwriter and performer in the middle of the 19th century. His most famous song is "Blaydon Races". He was a contemporary of Edward Corvan. He has been described by a council source as a candidate for Tyneside's most famous songwriter.

== Early life ==
George Ridley was possibly the best known of all the Tyneside performers /composers from that era. He was born in Gateshead on 10 February 1835, to Matthew Ridley (b 28 Sep 1807) and Frances Stephenson.

He was sent to Oakwellgate Colliery as trapper-boy at around the age of around eight years, but soon moved on to The Goose Pit (The Gyuess), where he worked for 10 years before moving on. His next job was with the heavy Engineering firm of Messrs Hawks, Crawshay and Co as waggon-rider where he stayed for three years. Whilst working here he was involved in a serious accident involving a wagon which went out of control and crushed him. This left him with a severe injury, which resulted in his being unfit for regular (heavy or manual) work.

== Later life ==
At this point he turned to performing as a means of support. One of his first venues as a professional was the Grainger Music Hall where he performed as a singer of Irish comic and old Tyneside songs. It was here that he introduced his first local song, Joey Jones. This was popular.

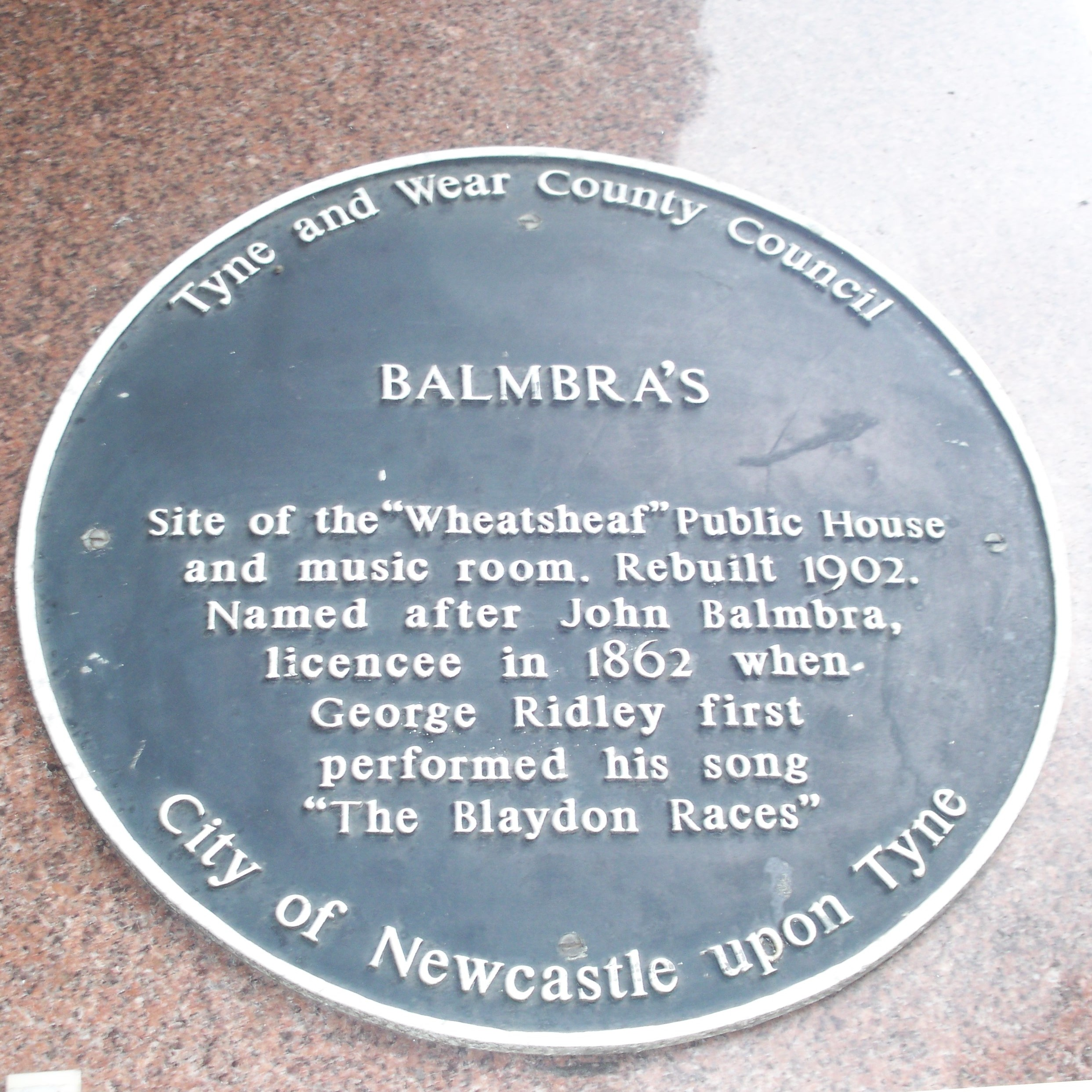
Site of the "Wheatsheaf" Public House and music room

He moved on to the Wheat-sheaf Music Hall (previously Balmbra's Music Hall, later renamed the Oxford) where he first performed his song "The Blaydon Races" in 1862.

He followed this by moving to the new Tyne Concert Hall opened by Mr. Stanley where he introduced the character Johnny Luik-Up the Bellman. This proved a great hit, not least because the character was almost lifelike. His performances took him all over the North East of England, his songs sold well in cheap editions and children were singing the catchy tunes in the streets. He became well known for The Bobby Cure and Johnny Luik-Up characters.

He never fully recovered from the injuries he suffered whilst working at Messrs Hawkes, Crawshay and Co and after only a short 5-year career his health started to fail and after a short illness, he died at his residence in Grahamsley Street, Gateshead, on Friday, 9 September 1864 at age 30. He was buried at St. Edmund's Cemetery.

There is a blue plaque (number 7837) on the wall of the William IV Public House, High Street, Gateshead (built on the site of a previous building in which he lived) inscribed "George "Geordie" Ridley (1835 – 1864)"

== Legacy ==
George Ridley was a Geordie born and bred; he wrote using the local Geordie dialect. He will never be remembered as a songwriter of great literary talent, but he did catch the spirit of the time, giving the audiences what they wanted, and the songs themselves have stood the test of time, many being just as well known and popular as when they were written. He apparently liked to be considered as a performer rather than a writer, and was well respected as such. He had a fine voice and was an artist in mimicry. Eric Burdon, the singer who first rose to fame as a member of The Animals is Ridley's great great nephew. Another family member, one of George's brothers, John Steven Ridley, came to fame on 10 March 1871 when he beat the English running champion in a one-mile race at Gateshead.

=== Works ===
These include :

- "Blaydon Races" - to the air "Brighton"
- "Cushie Butterfield" – to the air "Polly Perkins"
- "The Bobby Cure" – to the air "The Cure"
- "Johnny Luik-Up" – to the air "Sally Come Up"
- "The Stephenson Monument" – to the air "John Barleycorn"
- "Teasdale Wilson, The City Champion" – to the air "The Happiest Man Alive"
- "The Sheels Lass For Me" – to the air "The Whole Hog Or None"
- "Chambers" – to the air "The Whole Hog Or None"
- "Joey Jones"

=== Notes ===
Messrs Hawkes, Crawshay and Co, one of the largest employers in Gateshead, closed in 1889.

== See also ==
- Geordie dialect words
- Thomas Allan (publisher)
- Allan's Illustrated Edition of Tyneside Songs and Readings
