= Middle school =

Schooling in-between primary and secondary schools

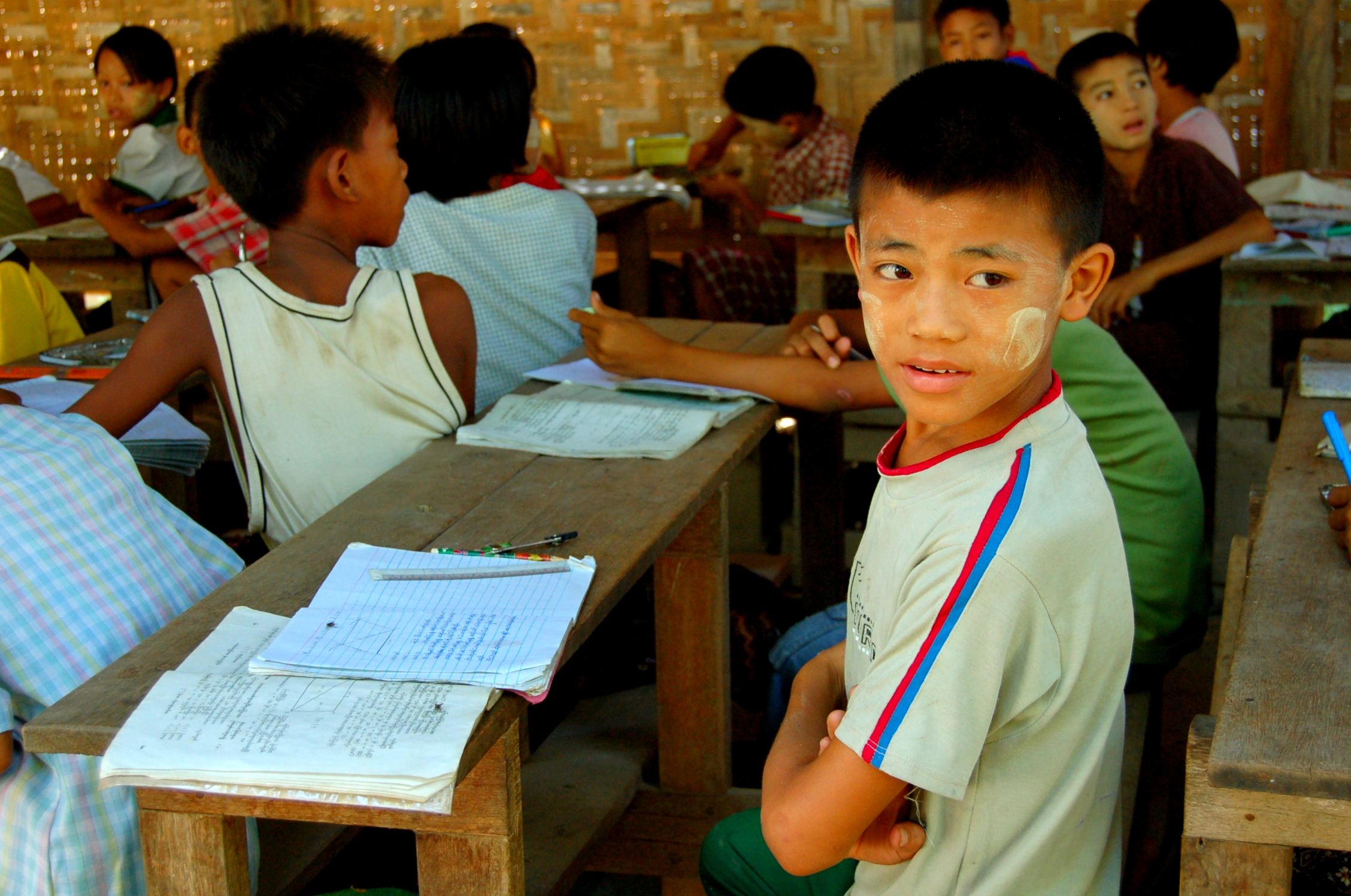
A middle school classroom in Myanmar in 2007

Middle school, also known as intermediate school, senior public school, junior high school, junior secondary school, or lower secondary school, is an educational stage between primary school and secondary school.

== Afghanistan ==
In Afghanistan, middle school includes grades 6, 7, 8, 9, and ten consisting of students from ages 11 to 14.

== Algeria ==
In Algeria, a middle school includes 4 grades: 6, 7, 8, and 9, consisting of students from ages 11–15.

== Argentina ==
The ciclo básico of secondary education (ages 11–14) is roughly equivalent to middle school.

== Australia ==
No states of Australia have separate middle schools, as students go directly from primary school (for years K/preparatory–6) to secondary school (years 7–12, usually referred to as high school).

As an alternative to the middle school model, some secondary schools classify their grades as "middle school" (years 5, 6, 7, 8 where primary and secondary campuses share facilities or 7, 8, 9 in a secondary campus) or "junior high school" (years 7, 8 and 9) and "senior high school" (years 10, 11 and 12). Some have three levels, "junior" (years 7 and 8), "intermediate" (years 9 and 10), and "senior" (years 11 and 12). Some schools run a specialised year 9 program separate from the other secondary year levels.

In 1996 and 1997, a national conference met to develop what became known as the National Middle Schooling Project, which aimed to develop a common Australian view of:

- early adolescent needs
- guiding principles for educators
- appropriate strategies to foster positive adolescent learning

The Northern Territory has introduced a three tier system featuring middle schools for years 7–9 (approximately ages 13–15) and high school year 10–12 (approximately ages 16–18).

Many schools across Queensland have introduced a middle school tier within their schools. The middle schools cover years 5 to 8.

== Bangladesh ==
In Bangladesh, middle school is not separated as in other countries. Generally, schools are from grade 1 to grade 10. It means primary (1–5), secondary (6 – 10). Class 6–8 is thought of as middle school. Grades 1, 2, 3, 4 and 5 are said to be primary school while all the classes from 6 to 10 are considered high school (as middle school and high school are not considered separate) while 11–12 (inclusive) is called college.

- 1–5 is known as primary
- 6–10 is known as secondary
- 11–12 is known as higher secondary also known as college

== Bolivia ==
Middle schools in Bolivia have been abolished since 1994. Students aged 11–15 attend the last years of elementary education or the first years of secondary education.

== Brazil ==
In Brazil, middle school is known as "Ensino Fundamental II" and is a mandatory stage that precedes high school (Ensino Médio) consisting of grades 6 to 9, ages 11 to 14.

== Cambodia ==
In Cambodia, middle school is known as "Lower Secondary School" and is an educational stage between primary school and secondary school. It covers grades 6 - 9 or 7 - 9 depending on whether the school follows the national public curriculum or an international system. It also consists of students' ages of 12 to 15 years old. After grade 9, students need to take a test referred to as the Grade 9 Diploma exam or simply "Diploma".

== Canada ==
In Canada, the terms "middle school", "senior public school", "junior high school" are all used, depending on which grades the school caters to. Junior high schools tend to include only grades 7, 8, and sometimes 9 (some older schools with the name 'carved in concrete' still use "Junior High" as part of their name, although grade nine is now missing), whereas middle schools are usually grades 6–8 or only grades 7–8 or 6–7 (i.e. around ages 11–14), varying from area to area and also according to population vs. building capacity.

Another common model is grades 5–8. Alberta, Nova Scotia, Newfoundland, and Prince Edward Island junior high schools typically include grades 7–9, with the first year of high school traditionally being grade 10. In some places students go from elementary school to secondary school, meaning the elementary school covers to the end of grade 8.

In Ontario, the terms "middle school" and "senior public school" (sometimes just grades 7 and 8) are used, with the latter being used particularly in the Old Toronto and Scarborough sections of Toronto plus in Mississauga, Brampton, and Kitchener-Waterloo. In many smaller Ontario cities and in some parts of larger cities, most elementary schools serve junior kindergarten to grade 8 meaning there are no separate middle schools buildings, while in some cities (such as Hamilton) specific schools do serve the intermediate grades (i.e. grades 6–8 or grades 7–8) but are still called "elementary" or "public" schools with no recognition of the grades they serve in their name.

In the province of Quebec, there is no middle school section; post-elementary grade 6, the secondary level has five grades, called Secondary I to Secondary V (grades 7 to 11).

== Chile ==
There is no separate "middle school" in Chile, but Educación Básica encompasses both elementary and middle schools; it covers grades 1 to 8, students from ages 6 to 14.

== China ==
In the People's Republic of China, primary school covers grades 1–6 and secondary school covers grades 7–12. Secondary schools are further divided into two stages, junior high school (初级中学; chūjí zhōngxué or 初中; chūzhōng, grades 7–9) and senior high school (高级中学; gāojí zhōngxué or 高中; gāozhōng), grades 10–12). The Chinese junior high school is roughly equivalent to an American middle school, and provides the last 3 years of the nine-year compulsory education required for all Chinese citizens. The senior high school is optional but considered as critical preparation for tertiary education.

The admissions for most students to enrol in senior secondary schools from the junior stage are on the basis of the scores that they get in "Senior High School Entrance Exam", (Note: Commonly referred as the "Middle Exam" (中考; Zhōngkǎo).) which are held by local governments. Other students may bypass the exam, based on their distinctive talents, like athletics, leadership merits or excellent coursework performance in junior stage.

== Colombia ==
Secondary education is divided into basic secondary (grades 6 to 9) and mid-secondary (grades 10 and 11). The students in basic secondary, roughly equivalent to middle school, are 11 or 12 to 15 or 16 years old.

== Cuba ==
Secundaria básica (basic secondary, seventh through ninth grades) is the approximate equivalent of middle school in Cuba.

== Cyprus ==
In Cyprus, the equivalent period to middle school is called γυμνάσιο (gymnasio 'gymnasium'), which caters to children between the ages 12 and 15, i.e. 7th, 8th, and 9th grade. This is followed by λύκειο (lykeio, 'lyceum'), for ages 16 to 18.

== Czech Republic ==
In the Czech Republic after completing the nine-year elementary school (compulsory school attendance) a student may apply for high school or grammar school.

Students have the opportunity to enroll in high school from Grade 5 or (less commonly) Grade 7 of elementary school, spending eight or six years respectively at high school that otherwise takes four years. Thus they can spend five years in elementary school, followed by eight in high school. The first four years of the eight-year study program at high school are comparable with junior high school. Gymnasium focuses on a more advanced academic approach to education. All other types of high schools except gymnasiums and conservatories (e.g. lyceums) accept only students that finished Grade 9.

== Ecuador ==
The 4th and last level of educación general básica (ages 12–14) is roughly equivalent to middle school.

== Egypt ==
In Egypt, middle school precedes high school. It is called the preparatory stage and consists of three phases: first preparatory in which students study more subjects than primary with different branches. For instance, algebra and geometry are taught instead of "mathematics." In the second preparatory phase, students study science, geography, the history of Egypt starting with pharaonic history, including Coptic history, Islamic history, and concluding with modern history. The students are taught two languages, Arabic and English. Middle school (preparatory stage) lasts for three years.

== France ==
In France, the equivalent period to middle school is collège, which lasts four years from the Sixième ("sixth," the equivalent of the Canadian and American Grade 6) to the Troisième ("third," the equivalent of the Canadian and American Grade 9), accommodating pupils aged between 11 and 15. Upon completion of the latter, students are awarded a brevet des collèges if they obtain a certain number of points on a series of tests in various subjects (French, history/geography, mathematics, physics/chemistry), but also on a series of skills completed during the last year and on oral examinations (e.g. about cross-subject topics on which they work during the final year of collège). They can then enter high school (called lycée), which lasts three years from the Seconde to the Terminale until the baccalauréat, and during which they can choose a general or a vocational field of study.

== Georgia ==
In Georgia, the equivalent period to middle school covers ages 12 to 15, from the 6th grade to the 9th and guarantees basic educational degree certificate.

== Greece ==
In Greece, the equivalent period to middle school is called γυμνάσιο (gymnasio, 'gymnasium'), which caters to children between the ages 12 and 15, i.e. 7th, 8th, and 9th grade.

== India ==
In India, Middle School is classified as Upper Primary (Class 6–8). Each state has its own State Board. Each has its own standards, which might be different from the Central Boards. In some institutions, providing education for 5th to 10th is known as a secondary school.

The levels of education in India are:

- Pre-Primary – Nursery to KG
- Primary (Lower Primary) – Classes I to V
- Middle School (Upper Primary) – Classes VI to VIII
- High school – Classes IX to X
- Higher Secondary (PUC or Intermediate or Plus Two) – Classes XI to XII

== Indonesia ==
In Indonesia, middle school (Indonesian: Sekolah Menengah Pertama, SMP) covers ages 12 to 15 or grade 7 to grade 9.

Although compulsory education ends at junior high, most pursue higher education. There are around 22,000 middle schools in Indonesia with a balanced ownership between public and private sector.

== Iran ==
Iran calls Middle School Guidance School, which caters to children between the ages 12 and 15, i.e. 7th, 8th and 9th grade.

== Iraq ==
Middle school in Iraq, which is most commonly referred to as Intermediate school, enrolls children between the ages 12 and 15, i.e. 7th, 8th, and 9th grade. Upon completion of the 9th grade, students take the National Intermediate Baccalaureate Examination, which when passed, students get the option to enter either secondary general or vocational school.

== Israel ==
In most of the cities in Israel, middle school (Hebrew: חטיבת ביניים, Khativat Beynaiym) covers ages 12 to 15 (7th-9th grade).

== Italy ==
In Italy the equivalent is the scuola secondaria di primo grado formerly and commonly called lower middle school (Scuola Media Inferiore), often shortened to middle school (Scuola Media). When the Scuola secondaria di secondo grado, the equivalent of high school, was formerly called higher middle school (superiori), commonly called Superiori. The Middle School lasts three years from the student age of 11 to age 13. Since 2009, after Gelmini reform, the middle school was renamed Scuola secondaria di primo grado (junior secondary school).

== Jamaica ==
Middle school does not exist in Jamaica. It is however from grade 7–9 so they would be in high school. (They also have a primary school (grades 1–6).)

== Japan ==
Junior high schools (中学校, chūgakkō) (7th-9th grade) are for children aged twelve through fifteen years old.

== Kosovo ==
In Kosovo, "middle school" refers to educational institutions for ages between 14 and 18, and lasts 3–4 years, following elementary school (which lasts 8 or 9 years). "Gymnasiums" are the most prestigious type of "middle" school.

== Kuwait ==
In Kuwait, middle school is from grade 6–9 and from age 11–14.

== Lebanon ==
In Lebanon, middle school or intermediate school consists of grades 7, 8, and 9. At the end of 9th grade, the student is given the National diploma examination.

== Malaysia ==
In Malaysia, the middle school equivalent is called lower secondary school which consists of students from age 13 to 15 (Form 1–3). (Note: Pelajar Menengah Rendah) Usually, these lower secondary schools are combined with upper secondary schools to form a single secondary school which is also known as high school. Students ( formerly ) at the end of their lower secondary studies are required to sit for an examination called PT3 (Form 3. 7 subjects for non-Muslim students and 8 subjects for Muslim students) in order to determine their field of studies for upper secondary (Form 4–5). [PT3 has been replaced by UASA (Ujian Akhir Sesi Akademik)]

== Mexico ==
In Mexico, the middle school system is called Secundaria and usually comprises three years, grades 7–9 (ages: 7: 12–13, 8: 13–14, 9: 14–15). It is completed after Primaria (Elementary School, up to grade 6: ages 6–12) and before Preparatoria/Bachillerato (High School, grades 10–12 ages 15–18).

== New Zealand ==
In New Zealand middle schools are known as "intermediate schools". They generally cover years 7 and 8 (formerly known as Forms 1 to 2). Students are generally aged between 10 and 13. There are full primary schools which also contain year 7 and 8 with students continuing to secondary school at year 9 (formerly known as Form 3). Some secondary schools also include years 7 and 8.

After 2000 there was an increased interest in middle schooling (for years 7–10) with at least seven schools offering education to this age group opening around the country in Auckland, Cambridge, Hamilton, Christchurch and Upper Hutt.

== Netherlands ==
In The Netherlands, middle school (secondary) is called "Middelbare School." Typically students begin middelbare at age 12 after completing primary school, and enter one of three streams based on interests and academic path.

1. VMBO (voorbereidend middelbaar beroepsonderwijs ): A four-year preparatory vocation-focused path, which has two levels — VMBO Basic and VMBO Kader - and leads to vocational training (MBO)
2. HAVO (hoger algemeen voortgezet onderwijs ): A five-year course that prepares students for tertiary education at a professional/technical university.
3. VWO (voorbereidend wetenschappelijk onderwijs ): A six-year course focusing on theoretical studies to prepare for attending a research university. The VWO schools are known as atheneum and a gymnasium. Gymnasium is the only level to teach Latin and Ancient Greek, as well as KCV (klassieke culturele vorming, literally translated as "classical cultural education".)

== Norway ==
In Norway, middle school (mellomtrinnet) is during the grades 5–7. (ages 10–12)

== Pakistan ==
In Pakistan, middle school is from Grade 6–8.

== Philippines ==
Since the implementation of the K–12 education system on April 24, 2012, middle school education in the Philippines is called "Junior High School." It lasts for 4 years from Grades 7 to 10 for students age 12 to 16. Some schools, such as Miriam College in Loyola Heights as well as Lourdes School of Quezon City in Sta. Mesa Heights, have their Middle Schools from Grades 6 to 8. It is preceded by a 6-year elementary school and followed by a 2-year "senior high school" program.

Until the phaseout of the 1945–2017 K–10 high school system on June 1, 2015, upon the start of SY 2015–2016, there were no official middle school programs implemented and the equivalent years was simply called "High School" which ranged from 1st Year to 4th Year.

== Poland ==
Following a 2017 education reform, the Polish middle school called gimnazjum was disbanded. After eight years of mandatory primary school, pupils can move on to a high school of choice, each spanning a year more than before.

Middle school in Poland was first introduced in 1932. The education was intended for pupils of at least 12 years of age and lasted four years. They were abolished by the Polish People's Republic government in a 1948 reform. The middle schools were then reinstated in 1999, lasting three years after six years of primary school. Pupils entering gimnazjum were usually 13 years old. Middle school was compulsory for all students, and was the final stage of mandatory education. In the final year students would take a standardized test to evaluate their academic skills. Based on the test results, they were then admitted to a high school of their choice.

== Portugal ==
In Portugal, the middle school is known as 2nd and 3rd cycles of basic education (2º e 3º ciclos do ensino básico). It comprises the 5th till 9th year of compulsory education, for children between ten and fifteen years old. After the education reform of 1986, the former preparatory school:

- 1st cycle (1º ciclo) – former primary education
  - "1st year" (6–7 years old)
  - "2nd year" (7–8 years old)
  - "3rd year" (8–9 years old)
  - "4th year" (9–10 years old)
- 2nd cycle (2º ciclo) – former preparatory education
  - "5th year" (10–11 years old)
  - "6th year" (11–12 years old)
- 3rd cycle (3º ciclo)
  - "7th year" (12–13 years old)
  - "8th year" (13–14 years old)
  - "9th year" (14–15 years old)
- High School (ensino secundário)
  - "10th year" (15–16 years old)
  - "11th year" (16–17 years old)
  - "12th year" (17–18 years old)

== Romania ==
Middle school in Romania, or gymnasium (gimnaziu), includes grades 5 to 8 and the students usually share the building with the students of primary school but in different wings/floors. Primary school lessons are taught by a handful of teachers: most are covered by one of them, and more specific areas such as foreign languages, religion or gym may have dedicated teachers. The transition to middle school changes of that to a one teacher per course model where the students usually remain in the same classroom while the teachers rotate between courses. At the end of the eighth grade (usually corresponding to age 14 or 15), students take a written exam that counts for 80% (before, it used to be 50%) of the average needed to enroll in high school. Students then go to high school or vocational school, depending on their final grade. Since 2020, all four years of upper secondary education, up to the twelfth grade, are compulsory. Until 2022, the education process was organized into two semesters, the first lasting 15 weeks between September and December and the second lasting 20 weeks between January and June. Starting with the 2022–2023 school year, the educational structure was changed, and the academic year is now divided into 5 learning modules separated by vacation periods.

== Russia ==
Middle school in Russia covers grades 5 to 9, and is a natural continuation of primary school activities (almost always they are in the same building with both primary and high school, usually located in different wings/floors). Primary school lessons are taught by a handful of teachers: most are covered by one of them, and more specific areas such as English or gym may have dedicated teachers. The transition to middle school changes that to a one teacher per course model, where teachers stay in their classrooms and pupils change rooms during breaks. Examples of courses include mathematics (split from grade 7 into algebra, geometry and physics), visual arts, Russian language, foreign language, history, literature, geography, biology, computer science, chemistry (from grade 8), social theory (in grade 9). The education process is done in numbered quarters, with the first quarter covering September and October, second quarter November and December, third quarter going from mid January to mid March, fourth quarter covering April and May. There are one week long holidays between quarters 1 and 2 as well as 3 and 4, somewhat longer holidays between quarters 2 and 3 to allow for New Year festivities, and a three-month break between the years. At the end of middle school most people stay in school for two more years and get a certificate allowing them to pursue university, but some switch to vocational-technical schools.

== Saudi Arabia ==
In Saudi Arabia, middle school includes grade 7 through 9, consisting of students from ages 12 to 15.

== Serbia ==
In Serbia "middle school" refers to educational institutions for ages between 14 and 18, and lasts 4 years, following elementary school (which lasts 8 or 9 years). "Gymnasiums" are the most prestigious type of "middle" school.

== Singapore ==
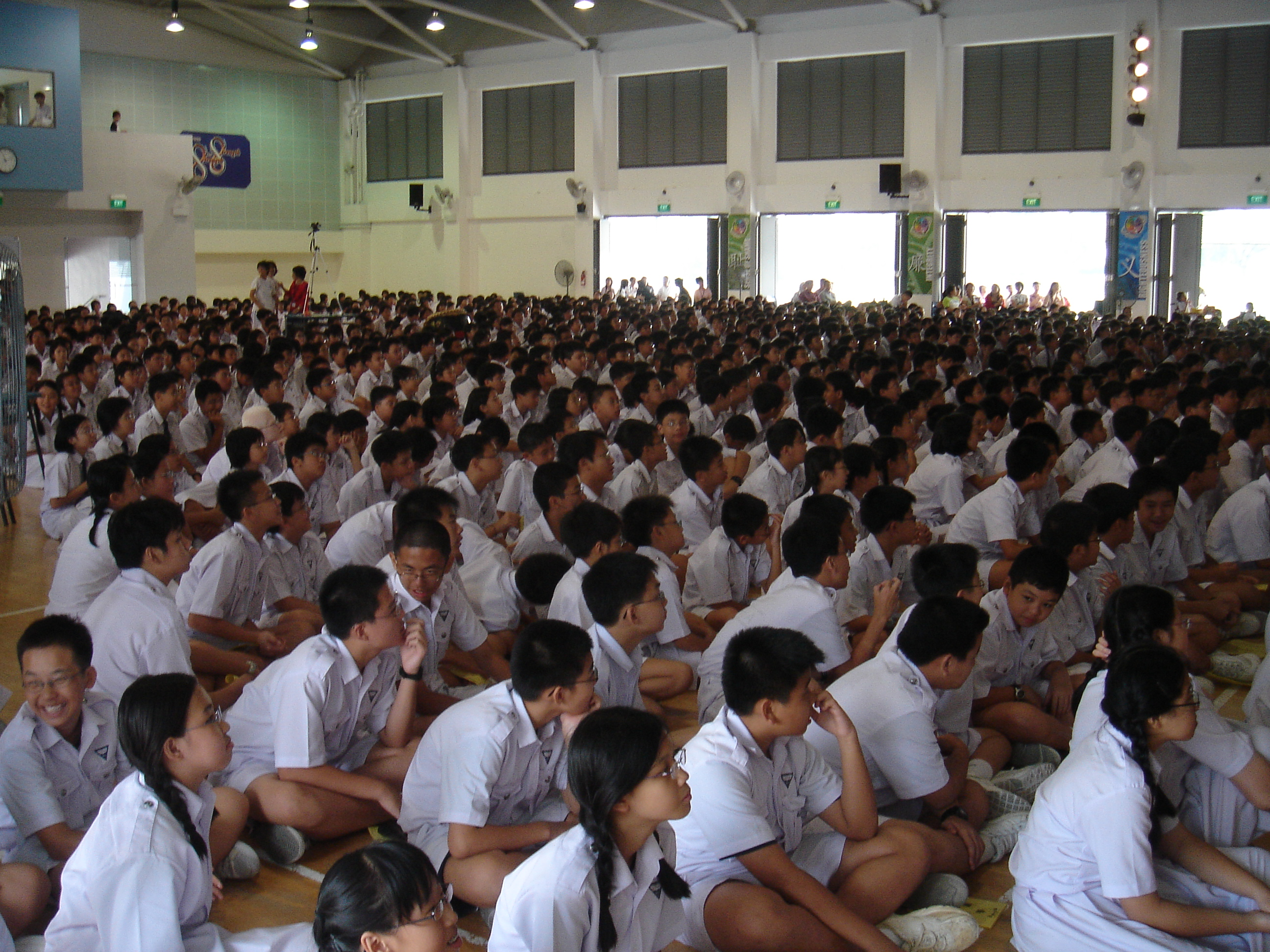
Students in the school hall of Nan Hua High School, a secondary school in Singapore

Middle school is equivalent to the lower secondary levels (secondary 1 & 2) of a secondary school in Singapore. It consists of students between 12 and 14 years of age. Secondary schools are also known as high schools in Singapore. Locally, middle school can also be called junior high school.

== Somalia ==
In Somalia, middle school identified as intermediate school is the four years between secondary school and primary school. Pupils start middle school from form as referred to in Somalia or year 5 and finish it at year 8. Students start middle school from the age of 11 and finish it when they are 14–15. Subjects, which middle school pupils take are: Somali, Arabic, English, Religion, Science, Geography, History, Math, Textiles, Art and Design, Physical Education (PE) (Football) and sometimes Music. In some middle schools, it is obligatory to study Italian.

== South Korea ==
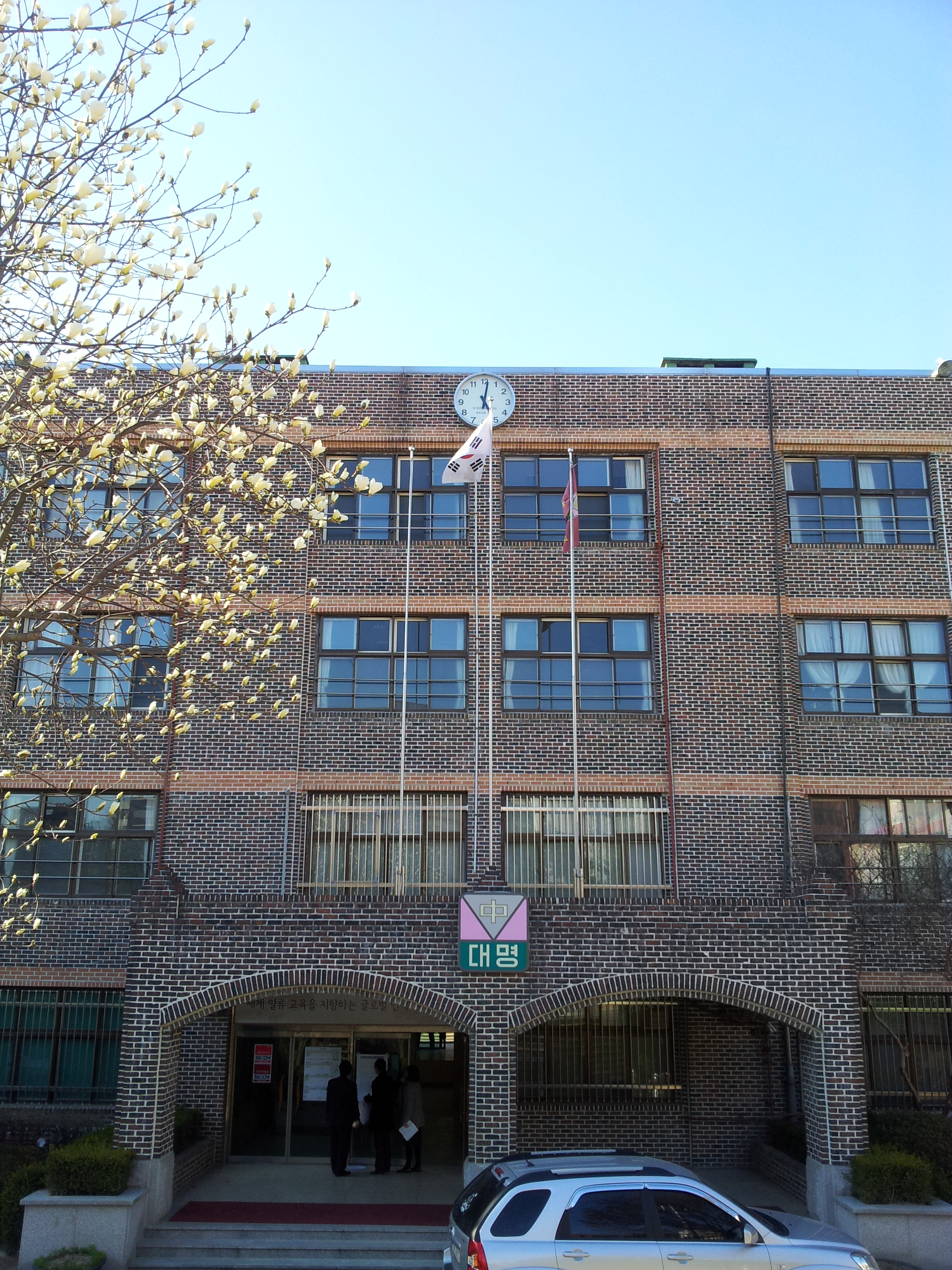
The school entrance of Daemyung middle school, a middle school in Seoul, South Korea.

In South Korea, a middle school is called a jung hakgyo (Hangul: 중학교; Hanja: 中學校) which includes grades 7 through 9 (referred to as: middle school 1st–3rd grades; approx. age 13–15).

== Spain ==
In Spain, education is compulsory for children and teenagers between 6 and 16 years. Basic education is divided into Educación Primaria (first grade through sixth grade), which is the Spanish equivalent of elementary school; and Educación Secundaria Obligatoria or ESO (seventh through tenth grade), roughly the Spanish equivalent of middle school and (partially) high school. The usual ages in ESO are 12 to 15 years old, but they can range between 11 and 16 depending on the birth date (a student who was born late in the year may start ESO at 11 if he or she will turn 12 before January 1, and a student who was born early in the year may finish ESO after turning 16).

After ESO, students can continue their pre-university education attending to Bachillerato (eleventh and twelfth grade) or choose a Ciclo de Formación Profesional (an improved type of vocational school).

== Sweden ==
In Sweden, middle school (mellanstadiet) is at grades 4–6 (age 10–12)

== Taiwan ==
Junior high schools (three years from 7th to 9th grade) in Taiwan were originally called primary middle school (初級中學; chūjí zhōngxué or 初中; chūzhōng). However, in August 1968, they were renamed national middle school (國民中學; guómín zhōngxué or 國中; guózhōng) often translated junior high) when they became free of charge and compulsory. Private middle school nowadays are still called primary middle school. Taiwanese students older than twelve normally attend junior high school. Accompanied with the switch from junior high to middle school was the cancellation of entrance examination needed to enter middle school.

== Tunisia and Morocco ==
In Tunisia and Morocco, a middle school includes grades 7 through 9, consisting of students from ages 12 to 15.

== Turkey ==
In Turkey, a middle school is called a ortaokul which includes grades 5 through 8, consisting of students from ages 10 to 14.

== United Kingdom ==
See Also: Education in England, Education in Wales, Education in Scotland, Education in Northern Ireland, and Education in Gibraltar

=== England and Wales ===
In England and Wales, local education authorities introduced middle schools in the 1960s and 1970s. The notion of middle schools was mooted by the Plowden Report of 1967 which proposed a change to a three-tier model including first schools for children aged between 5 and 8, middle schools for 8–12 year-olds, and then high schools for 12–16 year-olds. Some authorities introduced middle schools for ideological reasons, in line with the report, while others did so for more pragmatic reasons relating to the raising of the school leaving age in compulsory education to 16, or to introduce a comprehensive system.

Different authorities introduced different age-range schools, although in the main, three models were used:

- 5–8 first schools, followed by 8–12 middle schools, as suggested by Plowden
- 5–9 first schools, followed by 9–13 middle schools
- 5–10 first schools followed by 10–13 middle schools or intermediate schools

In many areas "primary school" rather than first school was used to denote the first tier.

In addition, some schools were provided as combined schools catering for pupils in the 5–12 age range as a combined first and middle school.

Around 2000 middle and combined schools were in place in the early 1980s. However, that number began to fall in the later 1980s with the introduction of the National Curriculum. The new curriculum's splits in Key Stages at age 11 encouraged the majority of local education authorities to return to a two-tier system of Primary (sometimes split into Infant schools and Junior schools) and Secondary schools. There are now fewer than 150 middle schools still operational in the United Kingdom, meaning that approximately 90% of middle schools have closed or reverted to primary school status since 1980. The system of 8–12 middle schools has fallen into complete disuse.

Under current legislation, as also at the time of the Plowden report, all schools must be deemed either primary or secondary. Thus, middle schools which have more primary year groups than KS3 or KS4 are termed "deemed primaries" or "middles-deemed-primaries," while those with more secondary-aged pupils, or with pupils in Y11 are termed "deemed secondaries" or "middles-deemed-secondaries." For statistical purposes, such schools are often included under primary and secondary categories "as deemed". Notably, most schools also follow teaching patterns in line with their deemed status, with most deemed-primary schools offering a primary-style curriculum taught by one class teacher, and most deemed-secondary schools adopting a more specialist-centred approach. Legally all-through schools are also considered middle schools (deemed secondary), although they are rarely referred to as such.

Some middle schools still exist in various areas of England. They are supported by the National Middle Schools' Forum. See List of middle schools in England.

=== Scotland ===
In Scotland, a similar system to the English one was trialled in Grangemouth middle schools, Falkirk between 1975 and 1987. The label of "junior high school" is used for some through schools in Orkney and Shetland which cater for pupils from 5 up to the age of 16, at which point they transfer to a nearby secondary school.

=== Northern Ireland ===
In Northern Ireland, in the Armagh, Banbridge and Craigavon District Council area in County Armagh, the Dickson Plan operates, whereby pupils attend a primary school from ages 4 to 10, a junior high school from 11 to 14, and a senior high school or grammar school from 14 to 19.

=== Gibraltar ===
There are four middle schools in Gibraltar, following the English model of middle-deemed-primary schools accommodating pupils aged between 9 and 12 (National Curriculum Years 4 to 7). The schools were opened in 1972 when the government introduced comprehensive education in the territory.

== United States ==
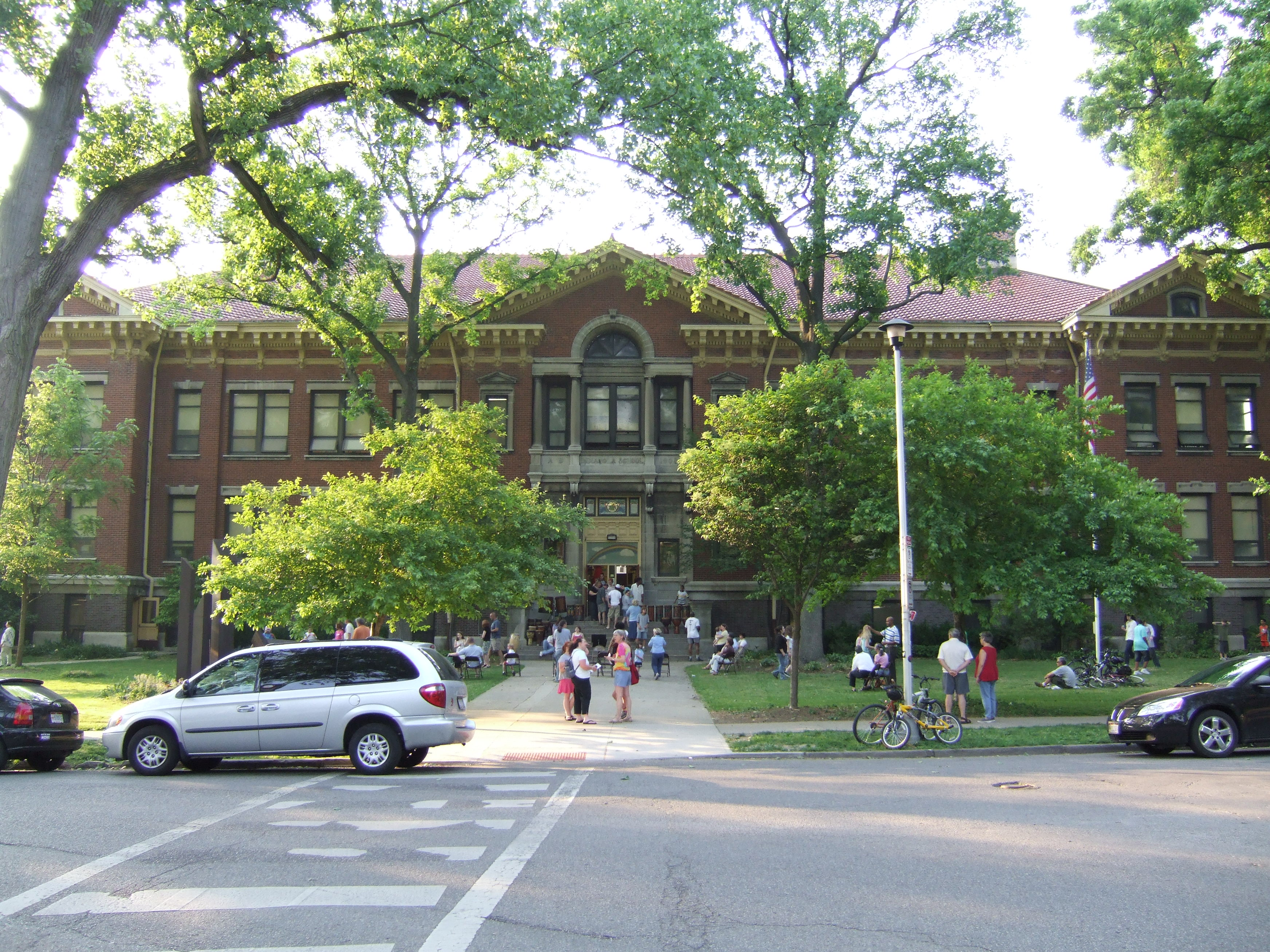
Indianola Junior High School in Columbus, Ohio, the first middle school in the United States

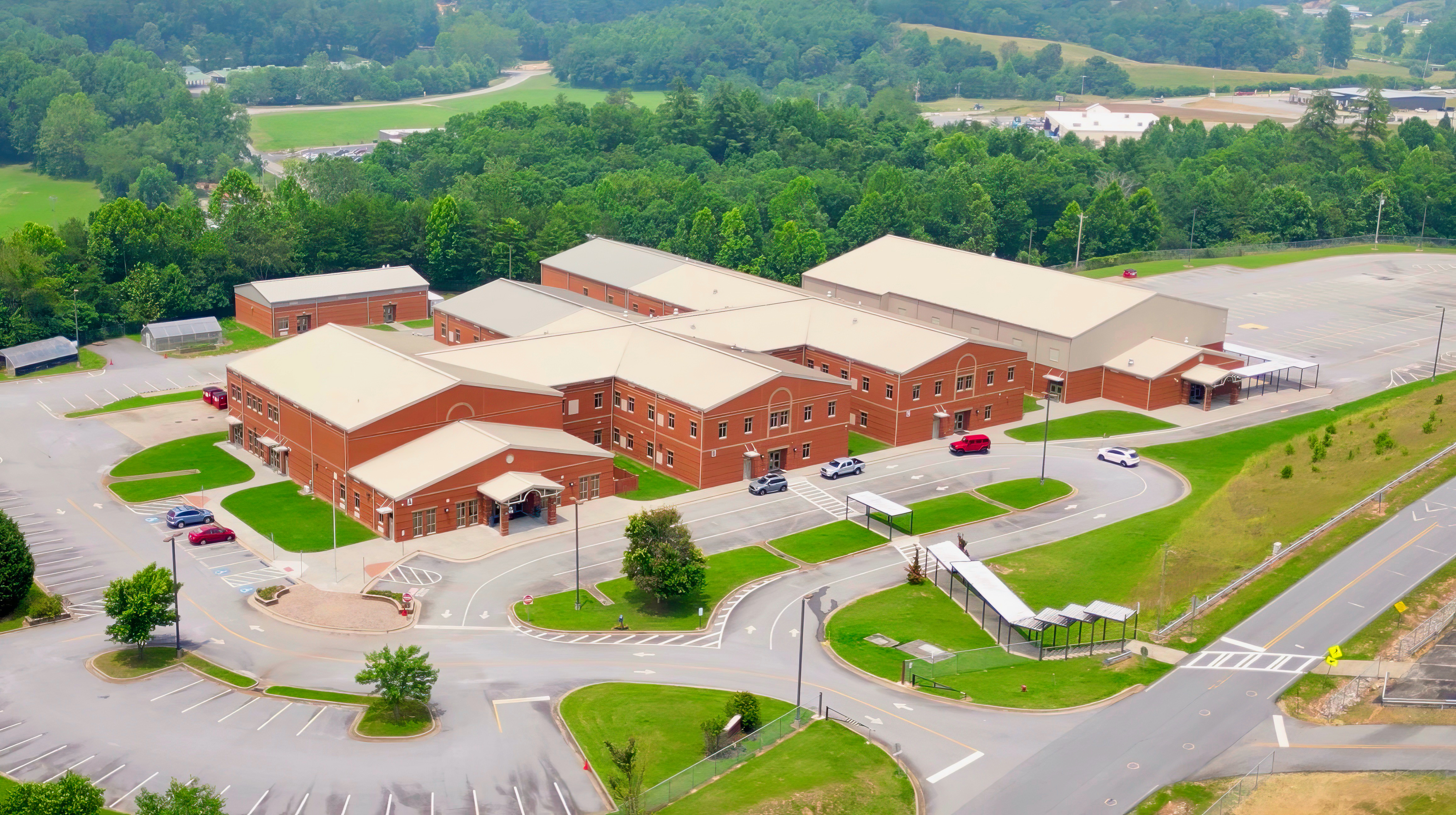
An aerial photo of a Union County Middle School in Blairsville, Georgia

In the United States, middle school is for students between the ages of 10 and 14 years and comprise grades six to eight with some including grade five. Junior high school is for students between the ages of 12 and 15 years and comprise grades seven to nine. However, some junior high schools and middle schools may only have grades 7 and 8.

The junior high school concept was introduced in 1909, in Columbus, Ohio. Junior high schools were created for "bridging the gap between the elementary and the high school", an emphasis credited to Charles W. Eliot. In the late 19th century and early 20th century, most American elementary schools had grades 1 through 8 (and 8 or earlier was often the last year of school for many students, who then went to work), and this organization still exists, where some concepts of middle school organization have been adapted to the intermediate grades. As time passed, the junior high school concept increased quickly as new school districts proliferated, or systems modernized buildings and curricula. This expansion continued through the 1960s. Jon Wiles, author of Developing Successful K–8 Schools: A Principal's Guide, said that "a major problem" for the original model was "the inclusion of the ninth grade", because of the lack of instructional flexibility, due to the requirement of having to earn high school credits in the ninth grade and that "the fully adolescent ninth grader in junior high school did not seem to belong with the students experiencing the onset of puberty".

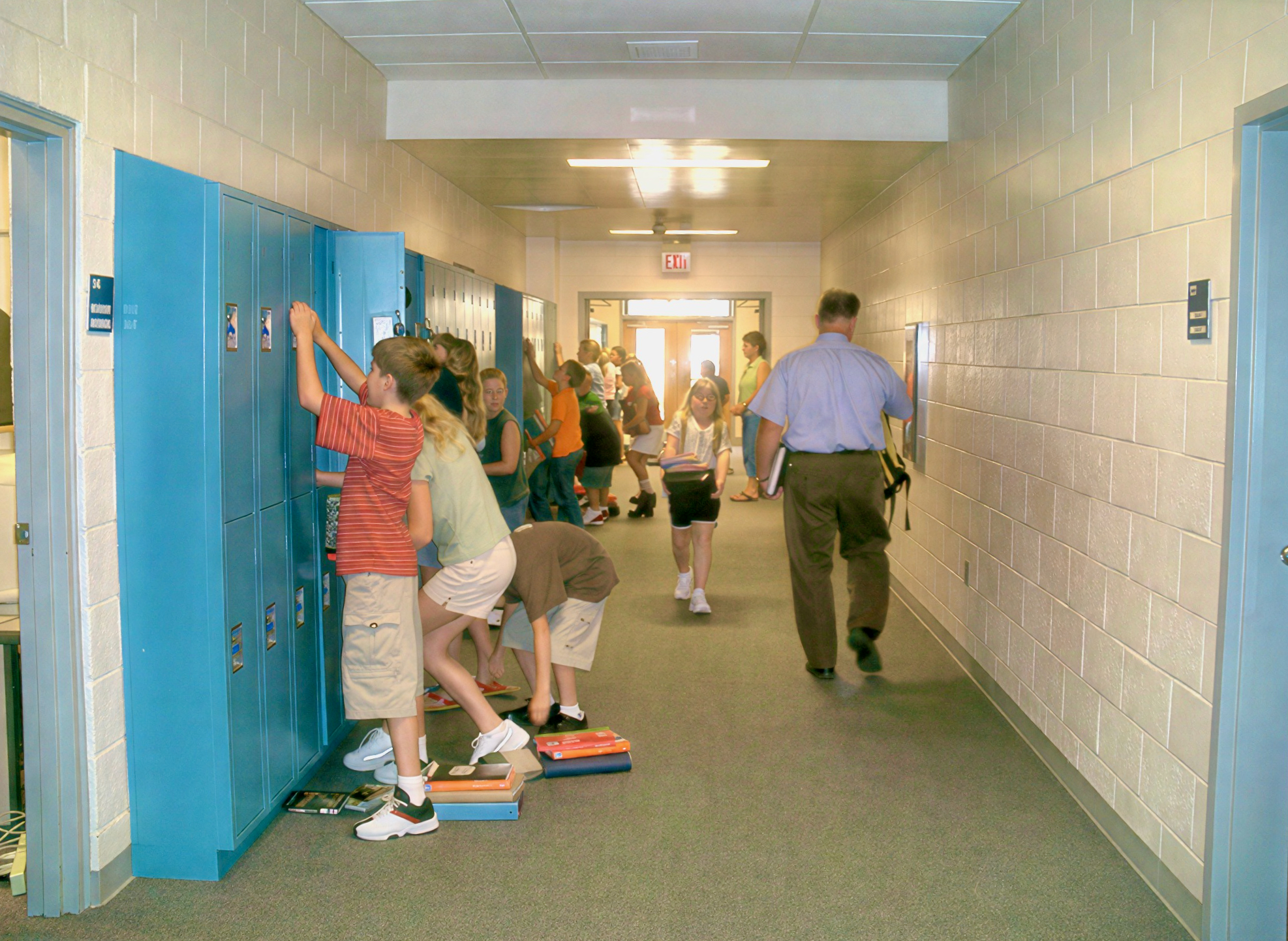
Public middle school students in a school hallway in North Carolina

The new middle school model began to appear in the mid-1960s. Wiles said, "At first, it was difficult to determine the difference between a junior high school and a middle school, but as the middle school became established, the differences became more pronounced."

The faculty is organized into academic departments that operate more or less independently of one another.

The middle school format has now replaced the junior high format by a ratio of about ten to one in the United States, but some school districts have incorporated both systems or a mix of the two.

== Uruguay ==
In Uruguay public secondary school consists of two stages, one mandatory called "Basic Cycle" or "First Cycle" (ciclo básico). This consists of three years, ages 12–13, 13–14 and 14–15 (equivalent to American 7th, 8th, and 9th grades), and one optional called "Second Cycle" (bachillerato), ages 15–16, 16–17 and 17–18 (equivalent to American 10th, 11th, and 12th grades). The Second Cycle is divided into 4 options in the Uruguayan 5th grade: "Human Sciences", "Biology", "Scientific" and "Arts", and 7 options in the 6th and last grade: "Law" or "Economy" (if Human Sciences course taken in 5th), "Medicine" or "Agronomy" (if Biological course taken in 5th), "Architecture" or "Engineering" (if Scientific course taken in 5th) and "Arts" (if Arts course taken in 5th).

Both these stages are commonly known as "Liceo" (Spanish for "high school").

== Venezuela ==
In Venezuela, middle schools (educación media general, ages 12–15) are from 7th grade to 9th grade.

In some institutions called "Technical Schools" there is an extra grade, for those who want to graduate as "Middle technician" in a certain area. This education would allow them to be hired at a higher level, or get introduced more easily into a college career.

== Vietnam ==
Secondary school, or Junior High school, includes grade 6 to 9. After finishing grade 9, students have to take the provincial graduating test, which includes sections on Mathematics, Literature and English. The maximum score for each test is 10, with the first two subjects (called the Core Subjects) multiplied by two for a total possible score of 50. Reward points from a vocational course could also be added to the final score.

Some public schools use graduating exam scores and student transcripts to make their decisions. Many other public and private schools require students who apply for those schools to take their entrance exams. The administration team student transcripts and exam scores to decide whether students are qualified based on their admissions criteria.
