= Eleanor Nesbitt =

British Punjabi scholar

Eleanor Margaret Nesbitt
- Born: 1951 (age 74–75); Bournemouth, UK
- Known for: Research in religious socialisation, Hinduism, Sikhism, Punjab Studies
- Title: Professor
- Spouse: Ram Krishan
- Parent(s): Martha Eleanor Nesbitt, William Ralph Nesbitt

Academic background
- Education: Girton College, Cambridge
- Thesis: The religious lives of Sikh children in Coventry (1995)
- Doctoral advisor: Professor Robert Jackson
- Influences: W.H. McLeod, John Bowker, Robert Jackson

Academic work
- Discipline: Religious Studies
- Institutions: University of Warwick

Eleanor Nesbitt (born 1951) is a British emerita professor in Education Studies at the University of Warwick, and a founding member of the UK's Punjab Research Group and the Journal of Sikh and Punjab Studies as well as coediting Brill's Encyclopedia of Sikhism.

== Early life and education ==
Eleanor Nesbitt was born in 1951 to Martha Eleanor Nesbitt and the Reverend William Ralph Nesbitt. She attended Talbot Heath School in Bournemouth before winning scholarships to Somerville College, Oxford and Girton College, Cambridge and then reading classics and theology at Girton College, Cambridge. At Girton she won a Henry Arthur Thomas travel exhibition.

== Career ==
Nesbitt completed teacher training at Oxford. From 1974 to 1977, she taught in Nainital and travelled widely in India. In 1977, she returned to England, taught for two years in a comprehensive in Coventry, then carried out research in Nottingham. In 2007 she became professor in education studies at the University of Warwick.

Nesbitt published studies on Sikh children in Coventry in 1991, 1997, 1999, 2000, 2004, and 2009. Her 1993 book, titled Hindu children in Britain and co-authored with Robert Jackson, is considered by several scholars in religious studies, including Dermot Killingley, as important in that field. In 1998 she published an article on British, Asian, and Hindu identity. In 2001, she published her research on what Hindus in the UK believed.

Her 2024 book, titled Sikh: Two Centuries of Western Women's Art & Writing, documents Sikh history through western women's encounters with Sikhs and their culture.

== Awards and honours ==
In 2003, Nesbitt delivered the Swarthmore Lecture, and in 2009 gave the George Richardson lecture. She received two lifetime achievement awards for her contribution to Sikh and Punjab Studies.

== Selected publications ==
=== Books ===
- Listening to Hindus Harper Collins 1990 ISBN 978-0-04-448121-8 (coauthored with Robert Jackson)
- Hindu children in Britain. Trentham. 1993. ISBN 978-0-948080-73-9. (Co-authored with Robert Jackson)
- Guru Nanak. Calgary: Bayeux Arts Incorporated. 1999. ISBN 1-85175-192-0. (Coauthored with Gopinder Kaur)
- Interfaith Pilgrims Quaker Books 2003 ISBN 978-0-85245-347-6
- Intercultural Education: Ethnographic and Religious Approaches. Liverpool University Press. 2004. ISBN 978-1-83624-082-2.
- Nesbitt, Eleanor (2005). Sikhism: A Very Short Introduction. Oxford University Press. doi:10.1093/actrade/9780198745570.001.0001. ISBN 9780198745570. (2nd edition 2016)
- Pool of Life: The Autobiography of a Punjabi Agony Aunt. Liverpool University Press. 2014. ISBN 978-1-78284-067-1. (Co-authored with Kailash Puri)
- Making Nothing Happen: Five Poets Explore Faith and Spirituality 2014 Routledge ISBN 978-1-4094-5515-8. (coauthored with Gavin D'Costa, Mark Pryce, Ruth Shelton and Nicola Slee)
- Coventry's Literary Trail. Positive Images Festival ISBN 978-0-9562779-1-6
- Sikh: Two Centuries of Western Women's Art and Writing. Kashi House. 2024. ISBN 978-1-911271-20-8.
- Quaker Quicks: Open to New Light: Quakers and Other Faiths. John Hunt Publishing. 2023. ISBN 978-1-80341-324-2.
- Sikhism: The Basics 2025 Routledge Co-authored with Nikky-Guninder Kaur Singh ISBN 978-1-032-41677-9
- Towards Hope, 2026, Universe Press, ISBN 978-1-916955-26-4

=== Articles ===
- Nesbitt, Eleanor (1 September 1995). "Panjabis in Britain: Cultural History and Cultural Choices". South Asia Research. 15 (2): 221–240. doi:10.1177/026272809501500203. ISSN 0262-7280.
- Nesbitt, Eleanor (1 October 1998). "British, Asian and Hindu: identity, self-narration and the ethnographic interview". Journal of Beliefs & Values. 19 (2): 189–200. doi:10.1080/1361767980190203. ISSN 1361-7672.
- Nesbitt, Eleanor (2004). ""My Dad's Hindu, my Mum's side are Sikhs": Issues in Religious Identity". British Journal of Religious Education. 20 (2): 113. doi:10.11588/xarep.00000234.
- Arweck, Elisabeth; Nesbitt, Eleanor (1 January 2010). "Young People's Identity Formation in Mixed-Faith Families: Continuity or Discontinuity of Religious Traditions?". Journal of Contemporary Religion. 25 (1): 67–87. doi:10.1080/13537900903416820. ISSN 1353-7903.
- Nesbitt, Eleanor, (2015) '"The Fools Argue about Flesh and Meat" Sikhism and Vegetarianism', Religions of South Asia, 9, 1, 81-101.
- Nesbitt, Eleanor (2026) '"I Find them Very Helpful, Courteous and Friendly": Irish Women's Encounters with Sikhs and Punjab', Sikh Formations, 22, 4, 385-399.

==== Chapters in edited volumes ====
- '"Deg tegh fateh!" Metal as Material and Metaphor in Sikh Tradition' in Fabrizio Ferrari and Thomas Dahnhardt (eds) Soulless Matter, Seats of Energy - Metals, Gems and Minerals in South Asian Traditions, London: Equinox, 174-200, 2016.
- 'Sikhism in Mainland Europe' in Pashaura Singh and Arvind-Pal Singh Mandair (eds) The Sikh World, London: Routledge, 160-170, 2023. doi.org/10.1080/17448727.2025.261090
- 'Punjabi Christians and Christians in Punjab' in Preetam Singh and Meena Danda (eds) Routledge Handbook of Punjab Studies, London: Routledge, 400-410, 2016.
