= Combined school =

School with primary and secondary enrolments

Combined school is a term used in the United Kingdom which has begun to lose its original meaning.

When, in 1967, the Plowden Report recommended a change in the structure of primary education in England, it proposed an arrangement of first and middle schools, catering for pupils aged 4–8 and 8-12 respectively. It also proposed the use of the term combined school to refer to those through schools which accepted pupils from age 4 to 12.

Some local education authorities, such as Buckinghamshire, introduced a large number of this type of school, but have since adapted their structures such that all such schools are now regular primary schools catering for pupils up to age 11. However, many of the schools have retained their former name as a combined school.

There remains a small number of combined schools, in the original sense, in Poole, Dorset.

The term is not exclusive to the UK. The Sarasota County Public Schools have three combination schools.
