= Robert Jackson (educator) =

British educator and educational researcher (b. 1945)

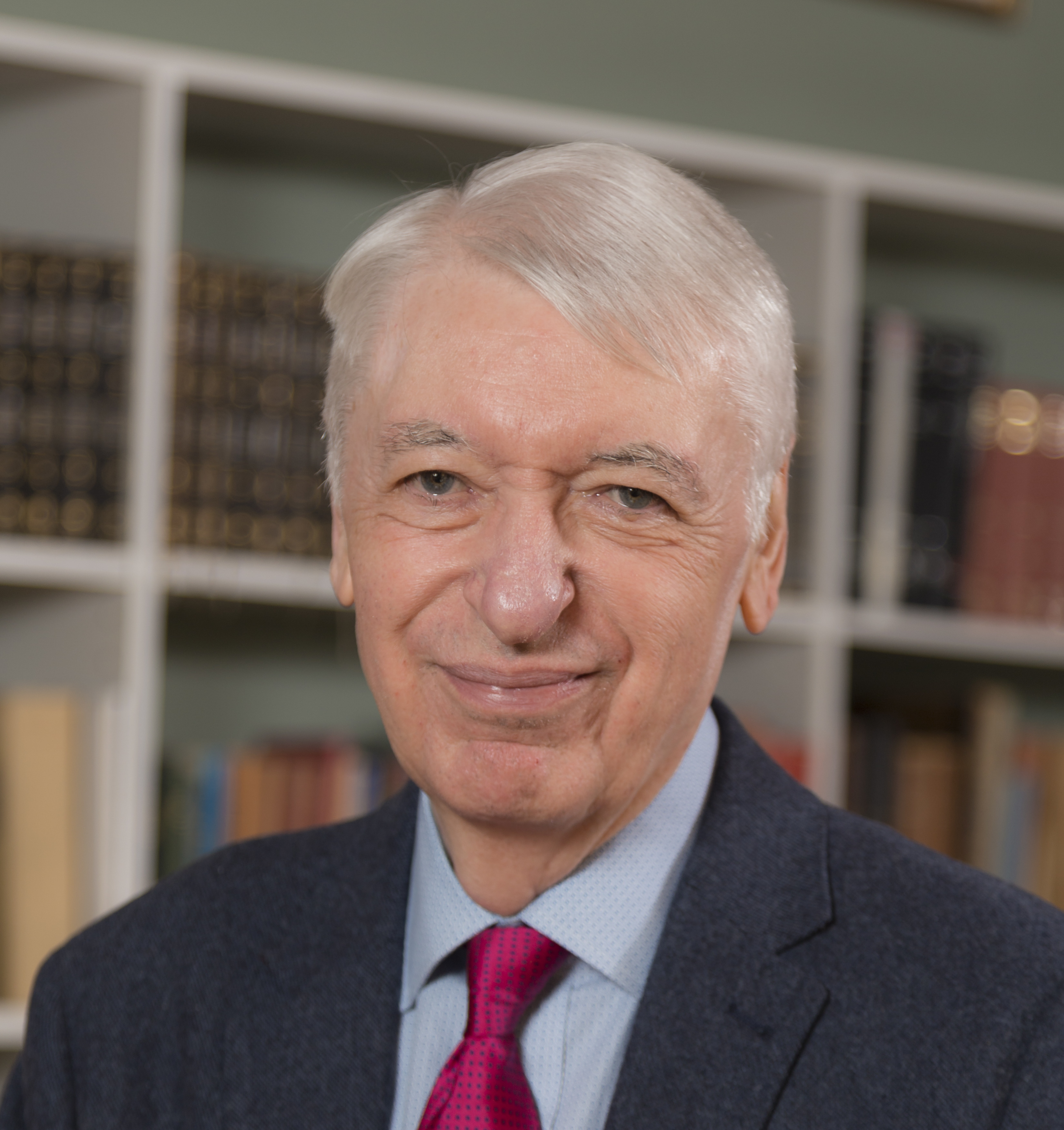
- Jackson in 2017
- Born: 1945 (age 80–81); United Kingdom
- Occupations: professor, educator and educational researcher
- Awards: William Rainey Harper Award; Honorary doctorate at the Norwegian University of Science and Technology (NTNU); Honorary doctorate at the Norwegian School of Theology (MF)

Robert Mason David "Bob" Jackson (born 11 June 1945) is a British educator and educational researcher working in the fields of religious and intercultural education in the UK and internationally, and in educational policy at the European level. He has authored several influential books on an inclusive form of religious education in which young people learn together about religious and world view diversity, and has contributed to policy development on the religious dimension of intercultural education for the Council of Europe. He has written and presented educational broadcasts for BBC Education, and has edited both professional and academic journals. His work has been influential in a variety of countries beyond Europe. Away from academic work, he is a jazz musician and poet.

== Education and teaching ==
He was born in Ilkeston, Derbyshire in 1945. He attended Hallcroft school, then studied Theology at St David's College, Lampeter (1963–1966), and for a Postgraduate Certificate in Education (PGCE) at the University of Cambridge (1966–67), where he was a member of Fitzwilliam College, and a member of the Footlights Dramatic Club. He completed an MA degree in Philosophy in 1975, and PhD in Arts Education in 1994 at the University of Warwick.

He taught at Nottingham High School 1967–1971, and at Coventry College of Education 1972–78, joining the Department of Arts Education (later Institute of Education, and then the Centre for Education Studies) at the University of Warwick in April 1978, becoming Professor of Religions and Education in 1995. He held Visiting Fellowships in Religions and Education at the School of Oriental and African Studies, University of London, in Autumn 1974 and Spring 1978, the first leading to the publication of Perspectives on World Religions, and the second to a series of BBC Education broadcasts on rites of passage experienced by members of religious communities in Britain.

He was awarded a DLitt degree by the University of Wales, Lampeter in 2006 for a selection of his published work.

== Empirical research ==
Influenced by meeting families of South Asian background in Coventry from 1972, Jackson began ethnographic research on Hindu families in Britain. He was joined in this work by Eleanor Nesbitt, and a report of their research was published in 1993. Following the formation of the Institute of Education at the University of Warwick in 1994, Jackson established and became Director of the Warwick Religions and Education Research Unit (WRERU) until his retirement from full-time work in 2012. He remains an active member of WRERU. Jackson led WRERU's contribution to the REDCo (Religion, Education, Dialogue, Conflict) Project, a European research project on religious education involving researchers, teachers and students from eight countries, funded by the European Commission. WRERU has continued with a range of externally funded studies with funding from sources including the UK Research Councils and charitable bodies.

Jackson was invited to become a member of the Steering Committee of ‘Religion and Society’ (2007–2012), an extensive UK research programme, taking a particular interest in projects concerned with education and youth, leading to the publication of a special issue of the Journal of Beliefs and Values in 2012, and a book co-edited with Elisabeth Arweck.

Jackson's ideas have been developed in various research contexts by others, including quantitative and qualitative studies, as well as action research studies undertaken by practitioners. Jackson's ideas have also been discussed with a view to adapting them to other national contexts, such as the USA.

== Religious education theory and didactics ==
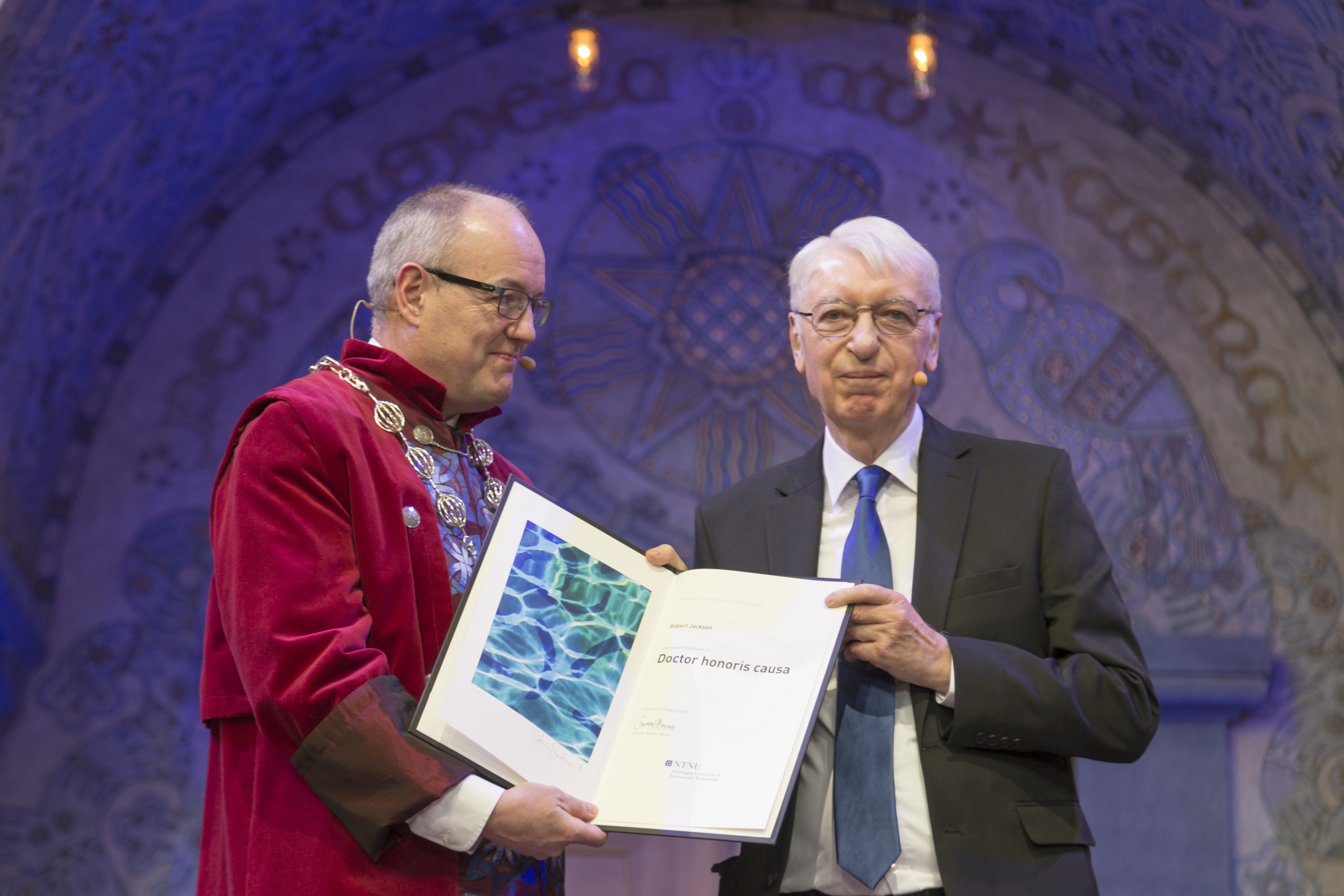
Jackson receiving his honorary doctorate diploma at NTNU, Trondheim in 2017. Left: NTNU's rector Gunnar Bovim

Jackson has continued to argue that an open and inclusive study of religions and other worldviews in state funded schools is intrinsic to a broadly based liberal education, while also contributing instrumentally to the personal development of students and to social aims, such as fostering appreciation for the human rights principle freedom of religion and belief.

Drawing on ideas and methods from his ethnographic studies, Jackson developed the interpretive approach to religious education, which examines the dynamic relationship between individuals, the various kinds of groups they relate to, and wider religious traditions. It was influenced by work in recent social anthropology, hermeneutics, religious studies, intercultural studies and social psychology, and deals with issues of representing and interpreting religions fairly and accurately. It also includes a reflexive dimension in which the learner or researcher reflects on the implications of new learning for their own personal development. Professor John M. Hull described Religious Education: An Interpretive Approach as «a major contribution to the academic and professional study of religious education.»

In his work on religious education and plurality, Jackson argues that the educational potential of the study of religion in state-funded schools has been underestimated; state schools should not be thought of as places of secular education, but as providing a pluralist context for educational development, and an environment encouraging dialogue. In reviewing Rethinking Religious Education and Plurality, John M. Hull wrote: «Jackson’s masterly work not only helps us to rethink religious education; it shows its wider educational significance and points to its exciting future».

Jackson's latest book – Religious Education for Plural Societies – is a compilation of selected writings from across his career organised into sections on empirical research; the interpretive approach to religious education; religious education and plurality; and human rights and international policy development. A substantial general introduction is provided, plus introductions for each section.

== Broadcasting ==
Jackson's work on families of religious minorities attracted the attention of BBC Education producers Ralph Rolls and Geoffrey Marshall-Taylor, and they invited him to make radio and radiovision programmes for school students of various ages, using actuality material and interviews.

== Editorships ==
Jackson edited Resource, which became the journal of the National Association for Teachers of Religious Education, from 1978 to 1996. In 1996, he succeeded John Hull as Editor of the British Journal of Religious Education, which he continued to do until 2011. Jackson extended Hull's policy of enhancing the academic status of the journal, including increasing its international profile, setting up editorial and international advisory boards, taking the journal to a commercial publisher, and gaining its inclusion in the Thomson Reuter citation index.

Jackson serves on the editorial boards of a range of European and international journals. He is co-editor of ‘Religious Diversity and Education in Europe’ an extensive book series published in Germany by Waxmann, and is a contributing editor to the University of Vienna's book series on Religious Education at Schools in Europe, and to Springer's International Handbooks on Religion and Education.

== Policy development ==
Jackson has been involved with the Council of Europe’s work on policy for religion and education since it first included this topic in 2002. He participated in a project on the Religious dimension of intercultural education which produced publications in 2004 and 2007. He co-organised the first Council of Europe «Exchange» between leaders of faith communities and humanist associations in Europe in Strasbourg in April 2008, and was part of the team which drafted the Recommendation by the Committee of Ministers on teaching about religions and non-religious convictions, published in 2008. In 2006 he conducted a study for the Council of Europe exploring the feasibility of a European educational centre, including studies of religious diversity. The recommendation to initiate an interdisciplinary centre, including intercultural, human rights and citizenship education, with cross-cutting subjects such as religion and history, was taken up by the Norwegian Government and the Council of Europe, and the European Wergeland Centre opened in Oslo in 2009. Jackson held a Visiting Professorship at Oslo University College (2009–2012) in order to take on the role of Special Adviser on religious diversity and education at the European Wergeland Centre. He continues in the role of Expert Adviser at the Council of Europe and the European Wergeland Centre. From 2011 to 2014 he was vice-chair of a joint Council of Europe and European Wergeland Centre committee given the task of disseminating the 2008 Council of Europe Ministerial recommendation. Jackson wrote the book Signposts which developed from this work, on behalf of the joint committee. Signposts was published in English in 2014 and has been translated into twelve European languages as well as Arabic. He is currently a Visiting Professor in the Department of Humanities and Social Sciences Education at Stockholm University, Sweden.

Jackson also contributed to the Toledo Guiding Principles on Teaching about Religions and Beliefs in Public Schools, published by the Office for Democratic Institutions and Human Rights of the Organization for Security and Co-operation in Europe.

== International outreach ==
Beyond his work in Europe, Jackson has contributed to discussions on the place of the study of religions in education in countries including the US, Canada, Japan, South Africa, and Australia.

== Honours ==
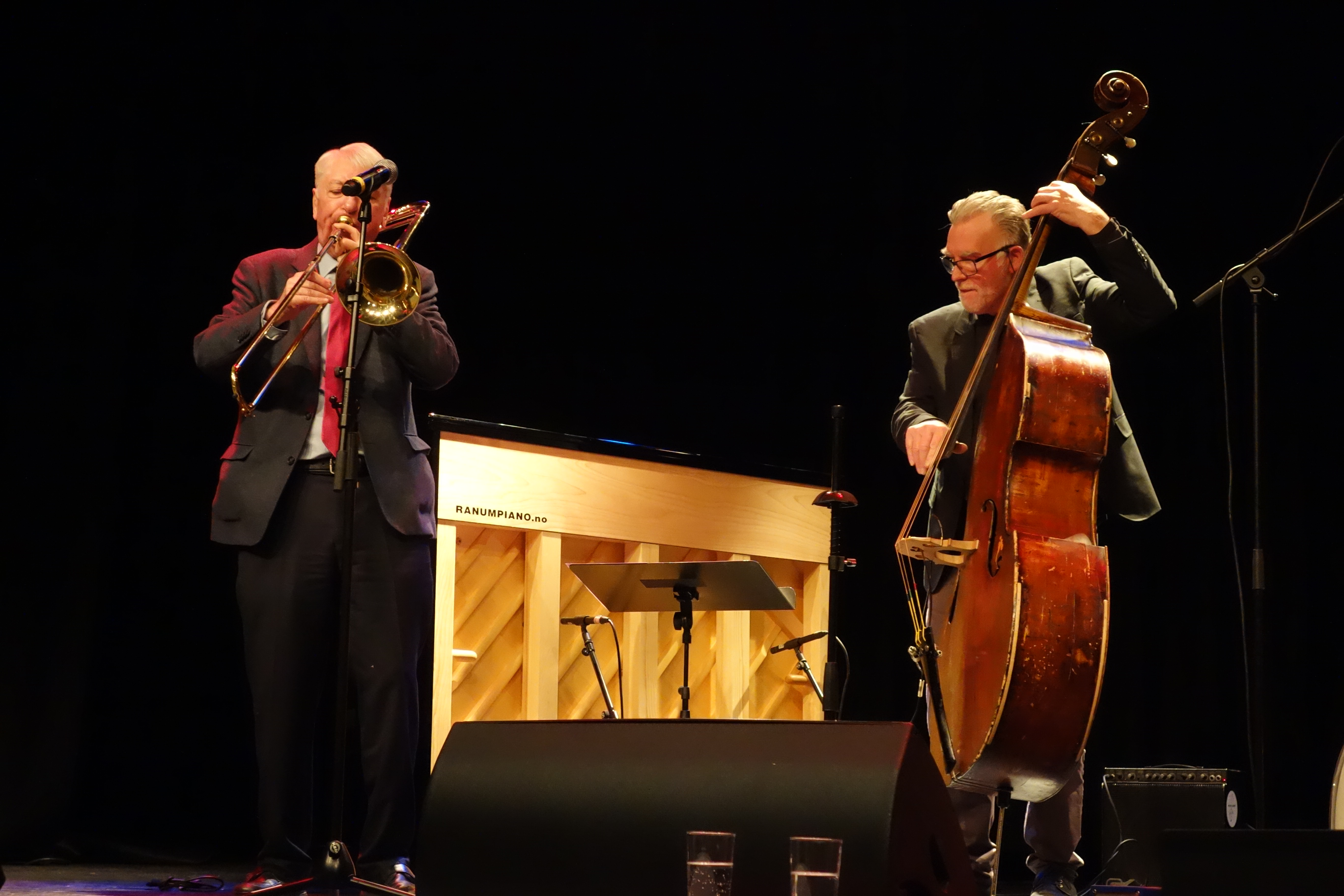
Jackson (trombone) and the Norwegian professor and jazz musician Bjørn Alterhaug (double bass). Trondheim, 2017

In 1990 Jackson gained an award from the Economic and Social Research Council, which supported the Religious Education and Community Project, studying children from a range of religious backgrounds in two English cities.

In 2010, Jackson was elected Academician (later Fellow) of the Academy of Social Sciences. He was awarded Life Membership of the Association of University Lecturers in Religious Education in July 2013. In November 2013, he became the 12th recipient of the William Rainey Harper Award from the Religious Education Association of the US and Canada, joining the ranks of Paulo Freire, Margaret Mead and Marshall McLuhan. The award is presented to ‘outstanding leaders whose work in other fields has had profound impact upon religious education’. A group of Jackson's former doctoral students produced a special issue of the American journal Religion & Education (vol 40, no. 1) and a Routledge book in his honour, both published in 2013.

In March 2017, Jackson was awarded an honorary doctorate (Doc h.c.) By the Norwegian University of Science and Technology (NTNU) for his contribution to religious and intercultural education in Norway and internationally, including his work for the Council of Europe. In October 2017, he was awarded an honorary doctorate by the Norwegian School of Theology (MF) in Oslo for his contributions to education in Norway and internationally.

== Jazz and poetry ==
Jackson has been a jazz musician throughout his career, regarding the music as a complement to his academic pursuits, comparing the eclectic nature and creative development of the interpretive approach to jazz music. His band, Spicy Jazz, has worked since the 1980s, mainly in the English Midlands. Jackson proposed trumpet player, bandleader, broadcaster and writer, Humphrey Lyttelton for an honorary doctorate at the University of Warwick, which was awarded in 1987. Lyttelton appeared as a guest with Spicy Jazz and wrote the sleeve note for their recording, Coming of Age. Following Humphrey Lyttelton's death in 2008, Jackson accepted an invitation to become patron of the Humph Trust. Jackson has also played Jazz in Sweden and in Norway, including playing with Bjørn Alterhaug, Vigleik Storaas and other leading Norwegian jazz musicians.

A further creative interest is poetry, and a selection of Jackson's poems, together with poems by Dermot Killingley, is published in Narrowboat Music. The book includes a song lyric dedicated to UK jazz trombonist Roy Williams, and performed by a trio from Spicy Jazz.

== Selected works ==
=== Books ===
- Jackson, Robert (1997). Religious Education: An Interpretive Approach. London: Hodder and Stoughton.
- Jackson, Robert (2004). Rethinking religious education and plurality: issues in diversity and pedagogy. Routledge. ISBN 9780415302715.
- Jackson, Robert (2018). Religious Education for Plural Societies: The Selected Works of Robert Jackson. London: Routledge. ISBN 9781315147314.
