= Kailash Puri =

Indian writer

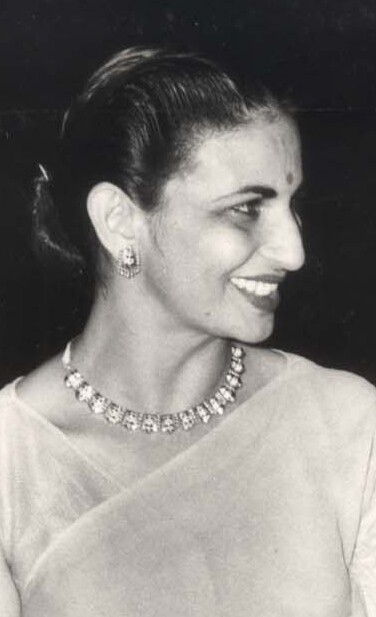
- Puri in 1963
- Born: 17 April 1925; Rawalpindi, Punjab Province, British Raj
- Died: 9 June 2017 (aged 92); Ealing, London, England
- Occupations: Writer; Agony aunt Poet; Yoga teacher
- Spouse: Gopal Singh Puri
- Children: 3
- Writing career
- Pen name: Hamraaz Maassi
- Language: English; Punjabi

Kailash Puri, popularly known as Humraaz Maasi (17 April 1925 – 9 June 2017) was an Indian writer, poet, yoga teacher, and agony aunt.

As a young mother, Puri began writing articles on cookery, family planning, and marital relations, publishing them in her weekly Punjabi magazine Subhagvati (1957–1965). She later produced, distributed and edited the Punjabi and English periodical Roopvati (1968–1974). In 1975 she became Marks & Spencer's first advisor on their range of Indian ready meals, and in the same year published her cookery book titled Highlights of Indian Cookery. During her lifetime she would produce ten books on sex, coining new sexual words difficult to translate to Punjabi.

== Early life and education ==
Kailash Puri was born on 17 April 1925 to Sohan Singh Puri and his wife Prem, in Rawalpindi, then in undivided India.

== Early career ==
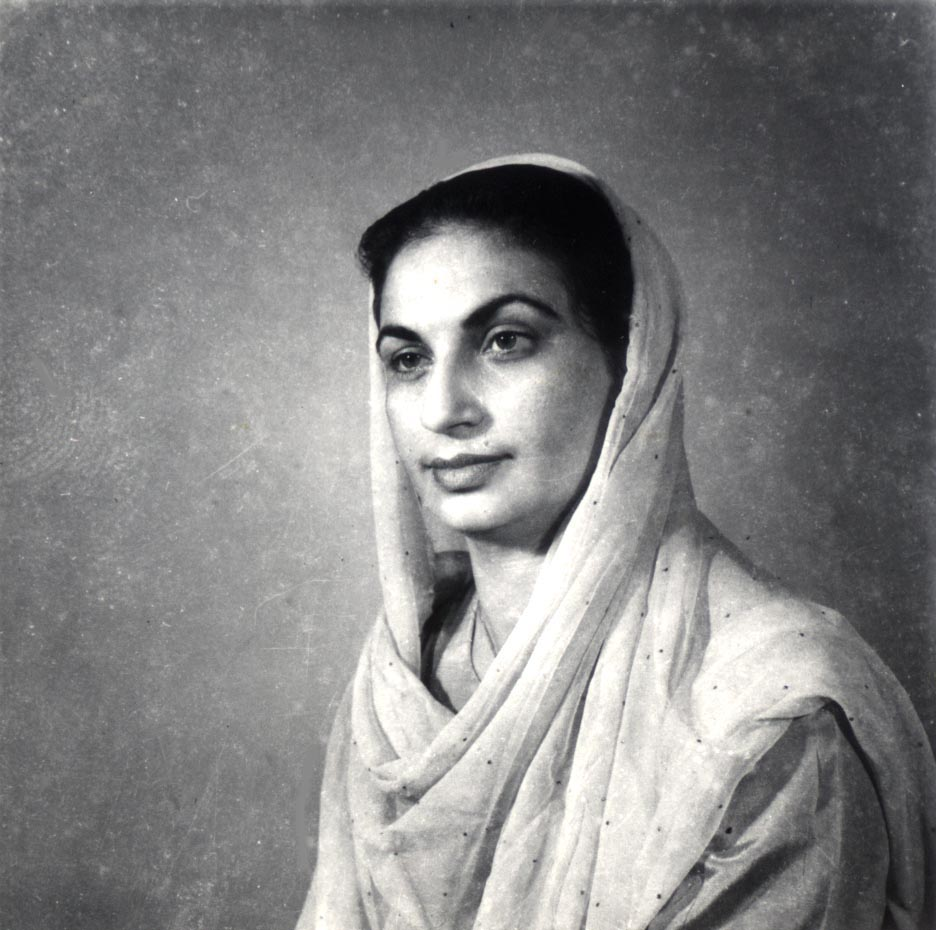
Kailash Puri in 1944

In 1943, at around the age of 16 years, Puri married Gopal Singh Puri, a scientist who gained a Government of India research fellowship in London, UK. Puri joined him in 1945 and they had their first child, a son, in 1947. They returned to India in 1950. As a young mother, Puri began writing articles on cookery, family planning, and marital relations, publishing them in her weekly Punjabi magazine Subhagvati (1957–1965). Puri accompanied her husband to his various posts in Dehra Dun, Pune and Allahabad, and then to Ibadan and Kumasi in West Africa.

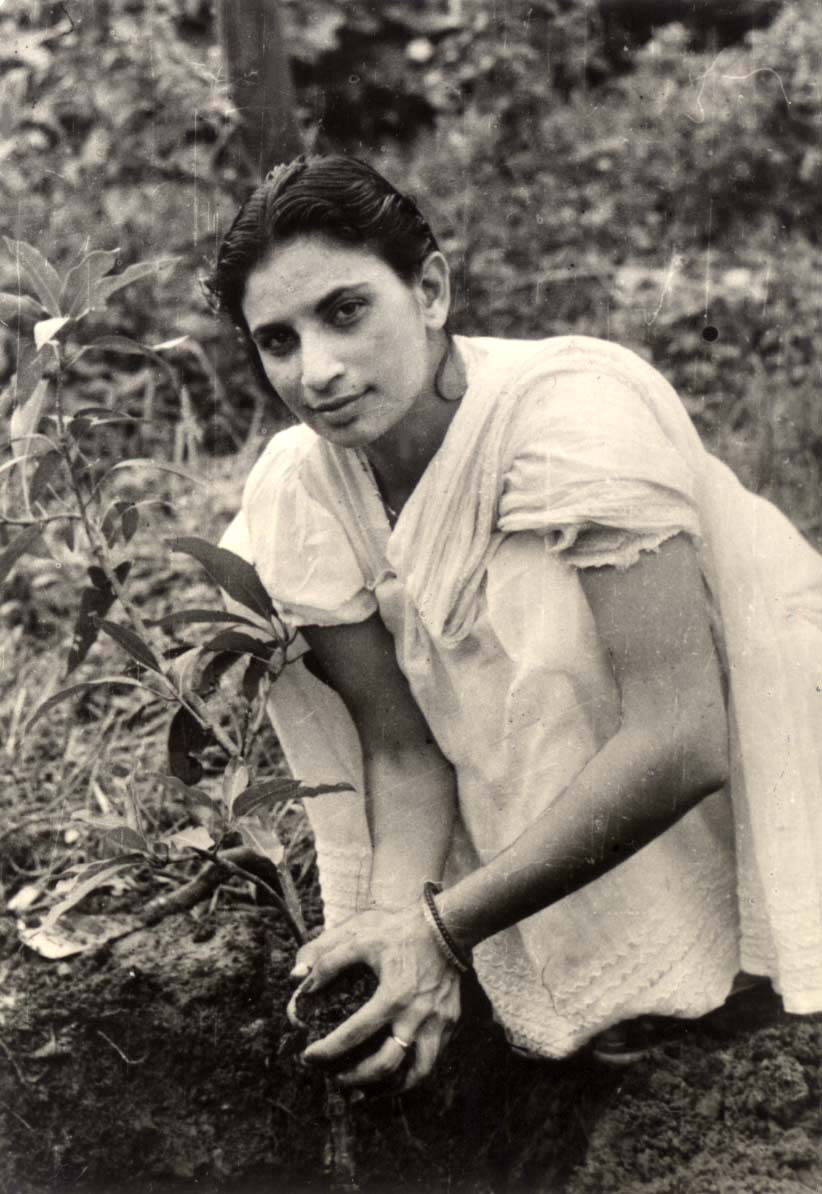
Kailash Puri in 1950

In 1966, by which time Puri also had two daughters, the family moved back to England and initially settled in Slough and Southall. Before moving to Liverpool, where her husband was offered a post, she worked in factories and then at Harrow Land Registry, while also teaching Punjabi and cooking. In Liverpool she delivered lectures on multicultural Britain, and became a founding member of the Community Relations Council. There, she also produced, distributed and edited Roopvati (1968–1974), an English and Punjabi magazine that incorporated the former Subhagvati. For Des Pardes she contributed to its columns. For the monthly Punjabi magazine Kaumi Ekta she regularly published features on sexual issues. During her lifetime she would produce ten books on sex, and become popularly known as Humraaz Maassi. For sexual terms difficult to translate to Punjabi, she made up new ones including "madan chhatri" (Cupid's umbrella) for clitoris, and "pashm" (silk) for its surrounding hair.

== Later career ==
In 1975 she became Marks & Spencer's first advisor on their range of Indian ready meals. In the same year she published her cookery book titled Highlights of Indian Cookery.

For 21 years Puri and her husband managed a yoga centre.

== Awards and honours ==
In 1982 Puri received the Bhai Mohan Singh Vaid literary award. In 1999 Ealing's mayor awarded her with a Millennium Woman Award.

== Death ==
Puri died at Ealing Hospital on 9 June 2017, 22 years after her husband.

== Selected publications ==
- Mysteries of Indian Cuisine Explained: Englishman's Guide to Indian Cookery (1975)
- The Myth of UK Integration. Whittles Publishing. 2012. ISBN 978-184995-059-6. (Co-authored with Bob Whittington)
- Pool of Life: The Autobiography of a Punjabi Agony Aunt. Liverpool University Press. 2014. ISBN 978-1-78284-067-1. (Co-authored with Eleanor Nesbitt)

== See also ==
- Jasvir Kang

== Bibliography ==
- Puri, Kailash; Nesbitt, Eleanor (2013). Pool of Life: The Autobiography of a Punjabi Agony Aunt. Liverpool University Press. ISBN 978-1-78284-067-1.
