= Jasvir Kang =

Indian writer, poet, and radio broadcaster

Jasvir Kang (1 February 1948 - 3 May 2023) was an Indian writer, poet, and radio broadcaster based in Coventry, UK. Along with Kailash Puri, her works offer insights into the experiences of emigrants from India to the UK, and include Aurat Abla Nay Hai (A Woman is not powerless), a collection of 16 short stories published in 1991/1992.
