= Grangemouth middle schools =

Middle schools in Grangemouth, Falkirk, Scotland

Grangemouth Middle Schools
- Grangemouth, Falkirk; Scotland

Information
- Type: Middle schools
- Established: 1975
- Closed: 1988
- Age: 10 (P6) to 14 (S2)

Abbotsgrange Middle School and Moray Middle School were schools that operated in Grangemouth, Scotland, between 1972 and 1988. They were the only two middle schools in the whole of Scotland and Grangemouth remains the only area of Scotland where experimentation in three-tier education was ever tried. Grangemouth is in the historic county of Stirlingshire in central Scotland and, following local government reorganisation in 1975, became part of the Falkirk District of the Central Region.

== Origins ==
The first mooting of the possibility of three-tier education in Grangemouth came shortly after the publication of a Scottish Education Department circular in 1965 which invited local authorities to indicate how they intended to go about restructuring their secondary education systems along comprehensive lines.

Stirlingshire Education Authority undertook discussion with the Scottish Education Department to remove various legal obstacles to the setting up of the schools. In August 1975 the scheme was fully realised.

== Legal obstacles ==
In common with England and Wales until 1964, there was no provision in education legislation for education provision to be made through anything other than a primary or a secondary school. Similarly, other legislation related to these definitions which were to be altered by Stirlingshire's experimental plans.

=== School status ===
While in England and Wales, the government sought to classify all Middle schools as either primary or secondary, depending on their age ranges, in Scotland, the Education (Scotland) Act 1969 sought to remove the classification barrier by using the generic term "school education" for the full age range of compulsory education.

=== Teacher qualifications ===
Scotland's educational legislation required that all teachers employed to teach secondary-aged pupils must be holders of the Teachers' Certificate for Secondary Education. If middle schools were to act as a bridge between the two sectors then it would be necessary to recruit primary school teachers to teach across the four-year-groups of the proposed schools. An initial agreement was made in 1974 to make a specific modification to The Schools (Scotland) Code 1956 which allowed teachers with primary certification to "assist in leisure activities, hobbies and extra-curricular activities" with pupils, under the supervision of a holder of a secondary teaching qualification. This did not allow teachers freedom to teach across the age range, but it did allow some integration to begin.

=== Funding ===
Since primary and secondary schools were funded differently, it was agreed that the new middle schools would be funded as though all pupils were of secondary age. In addition, those teachers with primary qualifications were to be paid a supplement to match the higher rate earned by those working in secondary schools.

== Operation ==
The initial proposals for Grangemouth were developed at a time of rapidly expanding pupil numbers. The intention was to include a newly built middle school to share a campus with Bowhouse Primary School, but this never came to fruition. As such, when the schools were first in full operation in 1975–6, there were only two middle schools, catering for over 1700 pupils.

From this stage, there were 6 primary schools offering education for pupils up to age 10 (that is, classes P1 to P5):

- Abbots Road Primary School
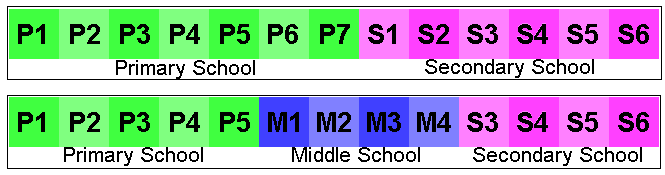
  Comparison of standard primary-secondary structure in Scotland and Middle school system in Grangemouth
- Beancross Primary School
- Bowhouse Primary School
- Dundas Primary School
- Grange Primary School
- Zetland Primary School

The two middle schools catered for pupils aged between 10 and 14, taking what had previously been the final two years in the primary school (P6 & P7, pupils aged 10–12) and the first two of secondary education (S1 and S2, aged 12–14). Classes in these schools were renamed M1 to M4:

- Abbotsgrange Middle School
- Moray Middle School

Because of the failure of the authority to provide a new middle school at Bowhouse, Moray had over 1100 pupils on roll in 1975 (well in excess of its intended capacity).

Following this, pupils were to attend high school for secondary years S3 to S6 (aged 14–18):

- Grangemouth High School

== End of the experiment ==
By the late 1980s, there were new concerns in Grangemouth. Following rapid expansion in earlier years, falling rolls in schools across the area put the middle school experiment at risk. Following consultation, rather than merge the two – now smaller – middle schools, the Central Regional Council opted to end the three-tier system in Grangemouth.

Proposals were put forward in January 1987 to see the middle schools closing at the end of the 1987–88 academic year. Council data showed that by this stage it was expected that there would be only 764 pupils between the two middle schools leaving spare capacity at over 40%. A similar issue was presenting itself at Grangemouth High School.

The proposals were accepted. In July 1988, Moray and Abbotsgrange Middle schools closed, ending the three-tier experiment in Scotland. Dundas and Grange Primary Schools were closed, and Moray re-opened as a through primary school for pupils in P1 to P7.

== See also ==
- List of middle schools in England
