= National Middle Schools' Forum =

- Formation: 1991; 35 years ago
- Region served: England
- Website: http://www.middleschools.org.uk/

The National Middle Schools' Forum (NMSF) is a national education association dedicated exclusively to the promotion and support of middle schools in England.

The organisation was first formed in 1991 as the Inter-Lea Middle Schools' Forum. The initial organisation was in part due to the recent Audit Commission response which proposed a rationalisation of primary education to remove middle schools. This process had started during the early 1980s and has continued throughout the 1990s and 2000s (decade).

Much of the support aspect of the forum continues to focus on local education authorities where proposals are under consideration for the removal of three-tier education systems.

It is the current aim of the forum to provide a focal point for networking and discussion among the remaining Middle Schools in England. It is recognised as a partner in work with government agencies, including the Department for Children, Schools and Families and the Qualifications and Curriculum Authority.

The forum holds a national conference for members, as well as sending delegates to international events, including the European League for Middle Level Education.
