= Dermot Killingley =

British orientalist

- Born: 1935 (age 90–91)
- Education: Merton College, Oxford
- Occupations: Orientalist, author
- Scientific career
- Fields: Orientalism
- Workplaces: University of Malaya, Newcastle University

Dermot Killingley (born: 1935) is a British orientalist, author and academic. He has published research on aspects of ancient Indian thought, and on modern developments, particularly Rammohun Roy, Vivekananda and Radhakrishnan.

== Biography ==
He was born in 1935 in Liverpool.

== Education ==
He studied Latin, Greek and Sanskrit in Merton College, Oxford from 1955 to 1959, and Middle Iranian languages in the School of Oriental and African Studies, University of London, from 1959 to 1961.

== Career ==
He taught in the Department of Indian Studies, University of Malaya, from 1961 to 1968.

He served as a professor in the Department of Religious Studies, Newcastle University, from 1970 to 2000, when he retired as Reader in Hindu Studies.

In 2008, he served in the University of Vienna as Visiting Professor.

== Bibliography ==
He is the author of a number of books:

- Approaches to Hinduism
- Moral Issues in the Hindu Tradition
- Beginning Sanskrit
- Rammohun Roy in Hindu and Christian tradition: The Teape lectures 1990
- A Handbook of Hinduism for Teachers

== See also ==
- The Dictionary of Modern American Philosophers
