= Three-tier education =

English schooling structure

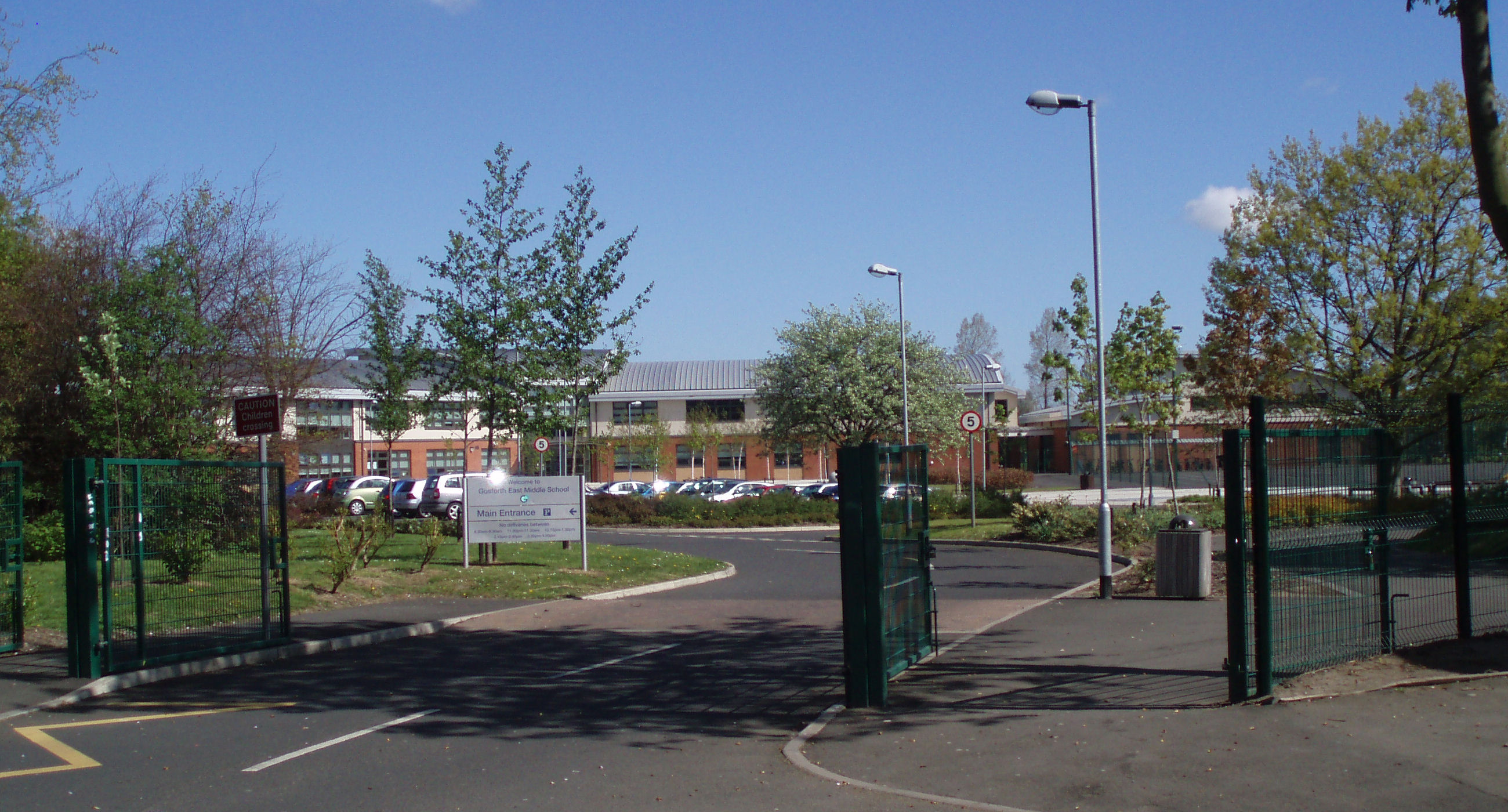
Gosforth East Middle School, a middle school in Gosforth, Newcastle

Three-tier education refers to those structures of schooling, which exist in some parts of England, where pupils are taught in three distinct school types as they progress through the education system.

== Terminology ==
In a three-tier local education authority children begin their compulsory education in a first school or lower school, which caters for children up to the age of 8 or 9. Children then transfer to a middle school, which caters for children from age 9 to age 13 or 14. Following this, children transfer for the remainder of their compulsory education to an upper school or high school, sometimes on into the sixth form.

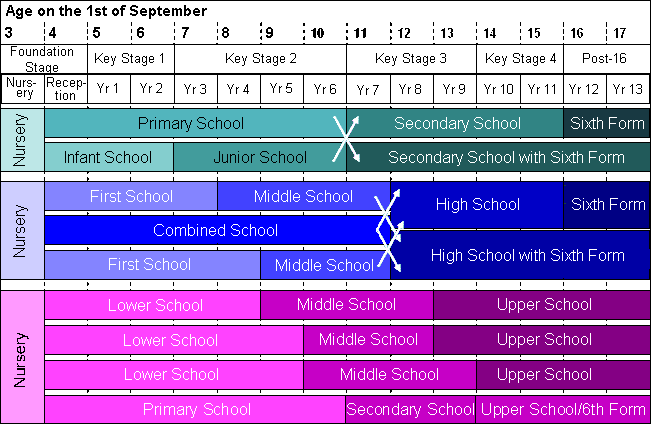
Diagram of paths through the school system in England. The three-tier systems are in blue and mauve.

== History ==
References to middle schools in publications of the UK Government date back to 1856, and the educational reports of William Henry Hadow mention the concept. It was not until 1963 that a local authority, the West Riding of Yorkshire, first proposed to introduce a middle-school system, with schools spanning ages 5–9, 9–13 and 13–18; one source suggests that the system was "introduced" in that year. Local education authorities were permitted to introduce middle schools by the Education Act 1964, subsequently, the notion of three-tier education was mooted by the Plowden Report of 1967—this proposed the introduction of first schools and middle schools, which would replace the existing system of infant and junior schools, as well as the first part of secondary schooling. The Plowden Report recommended that middle schools span ages 8 to 12.

The first middle school in England was introduced in 1968, in the Hemsworth division of the West Riding of Yorkshire. The first authority-wide systems of middle schools were introduced in 1970, in Stoke-on-Trent and Southampton. Numbers rapidly grew, with over a thousand opening in the decade from the first introduction. Sources suggest reasons for the introduction of the three-tier system in local authority areas included capacity problems, as a result of both the raising of the school leaving age to 16 from 15 (which took place in 1972), and the introduction of comprehensive education, with the schools themselves bypassing the traditional Eleven-plus exam which determined which secondary school pupils would attend.

The number of middle schools peaked in 1982, when over 1400 middle schools were open; by 2017, only 121 remained, and by 2019 the National Middle Schools' Forum recorded 107 in its directory, in 14 local authority areas. In 2006, it was reported that Bedfordshire, Northumberland and the Isle of Wight were the only LEAs still exclusively using the three-tier system.

Multiple reasons have been suggested by sources for this reversion to a two-tier system, including: a lack of clear identity, with the Department for Education and Science labelling them as either primary or secondary; a lack of teachers trained to teach in middle schools; and increased autonomy being given to schools, with upper and lower schools choosing to expand their age ranges. The introduction of the National Curriculum has also been cited, as the middle school system led to children changing schools partway through one of its Key Stages; the National Curriculum was cited by David Ward, then the councillor in Bradford responsible for education, as a reason for abolishing the system there, and local authority officials in Wiltshire, when closing the remaining middle schools in 2002, argued specifically that the mid-Key-Stage school change caused children to be disadvantaged. In addition, in Northumberland it was reported that closing its middle schools could allow the buildings to be sold to raise money for repairs to the remainder of the council's school estate.

The Inter-LEA Middle Schools Forum was founded in 1991, later changing its name to the National Middle Schools' Forum; it describes itself as "the voice of the middle school community".

In 2016, Nigel Huddleston raised the topic of three-tier education in Parliament; the schools minister, Nick Gibb, noted that the Government had no plans to abolish the three-tier system in areas retaining it.

== Similar systems ==
In Scotland, middle schools were operated in Grangemouth from 1974 to 1988, the system having been proposed in 1968.

In the private sector, some prep schools take pupils up to age 13. In addition, some private secondary schools admit pupils at 13, including some of those using the Common Entrance exam and some public schools.

Gibraltar's education system has a system of first, middle and secondary schools.

== See also ==
- Education in England
- List of middle schools in England
