= Religion & Education =

- Discipline: Religious education
- Language: English
- Edited by: Michael Waggoner

Publication details
- Former names: Religion and Public Education
- History: 1983–present
- Publisher: Routledge
- Frequency: Quarterly

Standard abbreviations
- ISO 4: Relig. Educ.

Indexing
- ISSN: 1550-7394 (print); 1949-8381 (web)
- LCCN: 2004212371
- OCLC no.: 231377500

Links
- Journal homepage; Online access; Online archive

Religion & Education is a peer-reviewed academic journal published four times a year that covers religion and spirituality in elementary, secondary, and higher education settings. It is published by Routledge and the editor-in-chief is Michael Waggoner, a Senior Research Fellow at the University of Northern Iowa.

== History ==
The journal was established in 1983 as Religion and Public Education by the National Council on Religion and Public Education. The founding editor-in-chief was Charles R. Kniker.

== Abstracting and indexing ==
The journal is abstracted or indexed in:

- Education Research Index
- EBSCO databases
- MLA International Bibliography
- Religion Index One: Periodicals
- Répertoire International de Littérature Musicale
- Referativny Zhurnal
