= 1998 North Tyneside Metropolitan Borough Council election =

1998 UK local government election

Elections to North Tyneside Council were held on 7 May 1998. One third of the council was up for election and the Labour Party kept overall control of the council.

After the election, the composition of the council was:

- Labour 43
- Conservative 8
- Liberal Democrat 7
- Independent 2

== Election result ==
North Tyneside local election result 1998
Party	Seats	Gains	Losses	Net gain/loss	Seats %	Votes %	Votes	+/−
Labour	11			-2	55.0			
Conservative	5			+1	25.0			
Liberal Democrats	4			+1	20.0			

== Monkseaton ==
North Tyneside Council Elections: Monkseaton ward 1998
Party	Candidate	Votes	%	±%
Conservative	Joan Bell	1,438	49.2	
Labour	R. Clarke	1,214	41.6	
Liberal Democrats	A. Reeds	268	9.2	
Majority		224		
Turnout				
Conservative hold		Swing		

== North Shields ==
North Tyneside Council Elections: North Shields ward 1998
Party	Candidate	Votes	%	±%
Labour	Frank Lott	1,116	47.4	
Conservative	L. Hamilton	863	36.6	
Liberal Democrats	A. McManus	376	16.0	
Majority		253		
Turnout				
Labour hold		Swing		

== Tynemouth ==
North Tyneside Council Elections: Tynemouth ward 1998
Party	Candidate	Votes	%	±%
Conservative	Ian Macaulay	1,627	59.3	
Labour	Brian Burdis	1,118	40.7	
Majority		509		
Turnout				
Conservative hold		Swing		

== Seatonville ==
North Tyneside Council Elections: Seatonville ward 1998
Party	Candidate	Votes	%	±%
Liberal Democrats	D. Street	1,490	52.1	
Labour	R. Cooper	841	29.4	
Conservative	Karen Johnston	527	18.4	
Majority		649		
Turnout				
Liberal Democrats hold		Swing		

== Cullercoats ==
North Tyneside Council Elections: Cullercoats ward 1998
Party	Candidate	Votes	%	±%
Conservative	Lawrence Goveas	1,834	56.5	
Labour	M. Ormston	1,410	43.5	
Majority		424		
Turnout		41.6		
Conservative hold		Swing		

== St. Mary's ==
North Tyneside Council Elections: St. Mary's ward 1998
Party	Candidate	Votes	%	±%
Conservative	J. Carr	1,949	71.0	
Labour	M. Cross	795	29.0	
Majority		1,154		
Turnout				
Conservative hold		Swing		

== Whitley Bay ==
North Tyneside Council Elections: Whitley Bay ward 1998
Party	Candidate	Votes	%	±%
Conservative	Janet McDonald	1,506	56.0	
Labour	R. Oliver	1,181	44.0	
Majority		312		
Turnout				
Conservative hold		Swing		

Preceded by 1996 North Tyneside Council election	North Tyneside local elections	Succeeded by 1999 North Tyneside Council election
