= 2014 North Tyneside Metropolitan Borough Council election =

2014 UK local government election

Results of the 2014 North Tyneside Metropolitan Borough Council election

Elections to North Tyneside Metropolitan Council took place on 22 May 2014. They coincided with other local elections happening in the UK that day, as well as the 2014 election to the European Parliament.

North Tyneside Council is elected "in thirds" which means one councillor from each three-member ward is elected each year with a fourth year when the mayoral election takes place.

One third of the councillors were elected in 2010 and the results below are compared to the last time the seats were fought, in 2012, or at by-elections in the case of Riverside and Wallsend.

North Tyneside Council Election Result 2014
Party	Seats	Gains	Losses	Net gain/loss	Seats %	Votes %	Votes	+/−
Labour	44	2	0	+2	73.3	46.9	25,917	-11.2%
Conservative	12	0	0	0	20	25.1	13,846	-9.1%
UKIP	0	0	0	0	0	21.1	11,656	+21.1%
Liberal Democrats	4	0	1	-1	6.6	4.4	2,407	-2.9%
Independent	0	0	1	-1	0	2	1,116	+2%
TUSC	0	0	0	0	0	0.4	198	+0.4%
Green	0	0	0	0	0	0.2	131	+0.2%

== Resulting Political Composition ==
Party	Seats			Council Composition 23 May 2014
Party	2012	2013	2014	Council Composition 23 May 2014
Labour	44	42	44	
Conservative	12	12	12	
Lib Dems	4	5	4	
Independent	0	1	0	

== Candidates by party ==
20 / 20 20 / 20 4 / 20 1 / 20	20 / 20 7 / 20 3 / 20

There were a total of 75 candidates standing across the 20 seats - an average of 3.75 in each ward. The Labour Party, Conservative Party and United Kingdom Independence Party all fielded a full slate of 20 candidates. The Liberal Democrats fielded 7 candidates, whilst there were 4 Independents, 3 candidates representing the Trade Unionist and Socialist Coalition and 1 candidate representing the Green Party.

Since the last local election in 2012, the number of candidates representing Labour, the Conservatives and Liberal Democrats was unchanged. UKIP, the TUSC and Green Party fielded no candidates in the 2012 election, so had increases of 20, 3 and 1 respectively. There were no Independent candidates in the 2012 election so there was an increase of 4.

== Battle Hill ==
North Tyneside Council Elections: Battle Hill ward 2014
Party	Candidate	Votes	%	±%
Labour	Dave McGarr	1,149	43.1	−16.4
Independent	Chris Croft	793	29.7	+29.7
UKIP	Phyllis Masters	518	19.4	+19.4
Conservative	John Snowdon	207	7.8	+1.1
Majority		356	13.3	−12.4
Turnout		2,667	32.6	+0.6
Labour hold		Swing	-23.1	

== Benton ==
North Tyneside Council Elections: Benton ward 2014
Party	Candidate	Votes	%	±%
Labour	Peter Earley	1,691	54.9	−10.5
Conservative	David McGrogan	774	25.1	−9.5
UKIP	Frederick Battey	535	17.4	+17.4
TUSC	Tim Wall	81	2.6	+2.6
Majority		917	29.8	−1
Turnout		3,081	39.5	+0.5
Labour hold		Swing	-0.5	

== Camperdown ==
North Tyneside Council Elections: Camperdown ward 2014
Party	Candidate	Votes	%	±%
Labour	Anne Arkle	1,391	59.1	−24.1
UKIP	Brian Clarke	696	29.6	+29.6
Conservative	Ian Wallace	268	11.4	−5.4
Majority		695	29.5	−36.9
Turnout		2,355	29.5	−5.3
Labour hold		Swing	-26.9	

== Chirton ==
North Tyneside Council Elections: Chirton ward 2014
Party	Candidate	Votes	%	±%
Labour	Margaret Reynolds	1,234	55.7	−24.3
UKIP	Stephen Brand	585	26.4	+26.4
Conservative	Heather Sarin	232	10.5	−9.5
Independent	Amanda Normand	165	7.4	+7.4
Majority		649	29.3	−30.7
Turnout		2,216	27	+3.1
Labour gain from Independent		Swing	-25.4	

== Collingwood ==
North Tyneside Council Elections: Collingwood ward 2014
Party	Candidate	Votes	%	±%
Labour	Steven Cox	1,401	47.6	−32.4
UKIP	Stephen Symington	681	23.1	+23.1
Conservative	Christopher Johnston	671	22.8	+2.8
Independent	Dave Taws	103	3.5	+3.5
Liberal Democrats	Pat Briscol	86	2.9	+2.9
Majority		720	24.5	−35.5
Turnout		2,942	35.8	+1
Labour hold		Swing	-27.8	

== Cullercoats ==
North Tyneside Council Elections: Cullercoats ward 2014
Party	Candidate	Votes	%	±%
Conservative	Kenneth Barrie	1,425	42.7	−11.9
Labour	Matthew Thirlaway	1,268	38	−7.4
UKIP	Stewart Hayes	642	19.3	+19.3
Majority		157	4.7	−4.5
Turnout		3,335	45	+1
Conservative hold		Swing	-2.3	

== Howdon ==
North Tyneside Council Elections: Howdon ward 2014
Party	Candidate	Votes	%	±%
Labour	Maureen Madden	1,343	60	−16.3
UKIP	Robert Mather	699	30.2	+30.2
Liberal Democrats	June Smith	144	6.2	−1.6
Conservative	David Griffith-Owen	130	5.6	+0.2
Majority		644	29.8	−36.1
Turnout		2,316	27.6	+2.1
Labour hold		Swing	-23.3	

== Killingworth ==
North Tyneside Council Elections: Killingworth ward 2014
Party	Candidate	Votes	%	±%
Labour	Linda Darke	1,453	55.2	−9.5
UKIP	Billy Couchman	627	23.8	+23.8
Conservative	Karen Johnston	552	21	−14.3
Majority		826	21.4	−8
Turnout		2,632	33.4	+0.8
Labour hold		Swing	-16.7	

== Longbenton ==
North Tyneside Council Elections: Longbenton ward 2014
Party	Candidate	Votes	%	±%
Labour	Joan Walker	1,580	62.5	−22.3
UKIP	Margaret Smith	634	25.1	+25.1
Conservative	Robin Underwood	314	12.4	−2.8
Majority		946	37.4	−32.1
Turnout		2,528	31.5	+3.6
Labour hold		Swing	-23.7	

== Monkseaton North ==
North Tyneside Council Elections: Monkseaton North ward 2014
Party	Candidate	Votes	%	±%
Conservative	Leslie Miller	1,218	41.9	−14.6
Labour	William Samuel	1,037	35.7	−0.5
UKIP	Stephen Borlos	466	16	+16
Liberal Democrats	David Nisbet	185	6.4	−0.9
Majority		181	6.2	−14.1
Turnout		2,906	42.2	+3
Conservative hold		Swing	-7.1	

== Monkseaton South ==
North Tyneside Council Elections: Monkseaton South ward 2014
Party	Candidate	Votes	%	±%
Labour	Ian Grayson	1,466	45.4	−5.4
Conservative	George Partis	1,163	36	−9.6
UKIP	Gary Legg	603	18.7	+18.7
Majority		303	9.4	+4
Turnout		3,232	42.8	+1.7
Labour hold		Swing	+2.1	

== Northumberland ==
North Tyneside Council Elections: Northumberland ward 2014
Party	Candidate	Votes	%	±%
Liberal Democrats	Marian Huscroft	868	37.3	−16.1
Labour	Andy Newman	847	36.4	−6
UKIP	Mark Bickerton	529	22.7	+22.7
Conservative	Jessica Bushbye	84	3.6	−0.6
Majority		21	0.9	−10.1
Turnout		2,328	25	+1.6
Liberal Democrats hold		Swing	-5	

== Preston ==
North Tyneside Council Elections: Preston ward 2014
Party	Candidate	Votes	%	±%
Labour	Kate Osborne	1,172	43.3	−8.4
Conservative	Glynis Barrie	988	36.5	−11.8
UKIP	John Clarke	545	20.1	+20.1
Majority		184	6.8	+3.5
Turnout		2,705	38.9	0
Labour hold		Swing	+1.7	

== Riverside ==
North Tyneside Council Elections: Riverside ward 2014
Party	Candidate	Votes	%	±%
Labour	Bruce Pickard	1,377	58.8	−26.8
UKIP	Bob Sword	656	28	+28
Conservative	Barbara Stevens	236	10.1	−3.3
TUSC	William Jarrett	74	3.1	+3.1
Majority		721	30.8	−40.5
Turnout		2,343	29.6	+13.9
Labour hold		Swing	-27.4	

A by-election was held in July 2013, and the changes are reflected from that result.

== St. Mary's ==
North Tyneside Council Elections: St. Mary's ward 2014
Party	Candidate	Votes	%	±%
Conservative	Pamela McIntyre	2,035	61.8	−16
Labour	David McMeekan	648	19.6	+3.1
UKIP	Elizabeth Borlos	450	13.7	+13.7
Liberal Democrats	Michael Day	162	4.9	−0.8
Majority		1,387	42.1	−19.1
Turnout		3,295	48.4	+0.5
Conservative hold		Swing	-9.6	

== Tynemouth ==
North Tyneside Council Elections: Tynemouth ward 2014
Party	Candidate	Votes	%	±%
Labour	Sarah Day	1,621	44.3	−4.6
Conservative	Linda Arkley	1,584	43.2	−7.9
UKIP	Marianne Follin	458	12.5	+12.5
Majority		37	1	−1.2
Turnout		3,663	44	+6.2
Labour hold		Swing	+1.7	

== Valley ==
North Tyneside Council Elections: Valley ward 2014
Party	Candidate	Votes	%	±%
Labour	Brian Burdis	1,366	56.6	−25
UKIP	Angie Potter	683	28.3	+28.3
Conservative	Alan Furness	364	15.1	−3.3
Majority		683	28.3	−34.8
Turnout		2,413	30.1	+3.7
Labour hold		Swing	-26.7	

== Wallsend ==
North Tyneside Council Elections: Wallsend ward 2014
Party	Candidate	Votes	%	±%
Labour	Linda Bell	914	37.6	+2.8
Liberal Democrats	Margaret Finlay	858	35.3	−22.9
UKIP	Frank Rogers	441	18.1	+18.1
Green	Martin Collins	131	5.4	+2.1
Conservative	John McGee	86	3.5	−0.1
Majority		56	2.3	−21.1
Turnout		2,430	31.3	+4.7
Labour gain from Liberal Democrats		Swing	+12.9	

A by-election was held in held in November 2012, and the changes are reflected from that result.

== Weetslade ==
North Tyneside Council Elections: Weetslade ward 2014
Party	Candidate	Votes	%	±%
Labour	Joanne Cassidy	1,445	48.4	−15.6
UKIP	Irene Davidson	839	28.1	+28.1
Conservative	Andrew Elliott	659	22.1	−13.9
TUSC	Lynne Sample	43	1.4	+1.4
Majority		606	20.3	−7.7
Turnout		2,986	39.5	+0.7
Labour hold		Swing	-21.9	

== Whitley Bay ==
North Tyneside Council Elections: Whitley Bay ward 2014
Party	Candidate	Votes	%	±%
Labour	Margaret Hall	1,514	52.2	+0.1
Conservative	Frank Austin	856	29.5	−18.4
UKIP	Henry Marshall	369	12.7	+12.7
Liberal Democrats	John Appleby	108	3.7	+3.7
Independent	Carlos Caldeira	55	1.9	+1.9
Majority		658	22.7	+18.5
Turnout		2,902	40.7	+1.9
Labour hold		Swing	+9.3	

Preceded by 2013 North Tyneside Council mayoral election	North Tyneside local elections	Succeeded by 2015 North Tyneside Metropolitan Borough Council election
