= North Tyneside Metropolitan Borough Council elections =

Local government elections in Tyne and Wear, England

North Tyneside Metropolitan Borough Council elections are generally held three years out of every four, with a third of the council being elected each time. North Tyneside Borough Council, generally known as North Tyneside Council is the local authority for the metropolitan borough of North Tyneside in Tyne and Wear, England. Since 2002 the borough has been led by the directly elected Mayor of North Tyneside.

== Council elections ==
- 1995 North Tyneside Metropolitan Borough Council election
- 1996 North Tyneside Metropolitan Borough Council election
- 1998 North Tyneside Metropolitan Borough Council election
- 1999 North Tyneside Metropolitan Borough Council election
- 2000 North Tyneside Metropolitan Borough Council election
- 2002 North Tyneside Metropolitan Borough Council election
- 2003 North Tyneside Metropolitan Borough Council election
- 2004 North Tyneside Metropolitan Borough Council election (new ward boundaries)
- 2006 North Tyneside Metropolitan Borough Council election
- 2007 North Tyneside Metropolitan Borough Council election
- 2008 North Tyneside Metropolitan Borough Council election
- 2010 North Tyneside Metropolitan Borough Council election
- 2011 North Tyneside Metropolitan Borough Council election
- 2012 North Tyneside Metropolitan Borough Council election
- 2014 North Tyneside Metropolitan Borough Council election
- 2015 North Tyneside Metropolitan Borough Council election
- 2016 North Tyneside Metropolitan Borough Council election
- 2018 North Tyneside Metropolitan Borough Council election
- 2019 North Tyneside Metropolitan Borough Council election
- 2021 North Tyneside Metropolitan Borough Council election
- 2022 North Tyneside Metropolitan Borough Council election
- 2023 North Tyneside Metropolitan Borough Council election
- 2024 North Tyneside Metropolitan Borough Council election (new ward boundaries)
- 2026 North Tyneside Metropolitan Borough Council election

== Results maps ==
2004 results map

2006 results map

2007 results map

2008 results map

2010 results map

2011 results map

2012 results map

2014 results map

2015 results map

2016 results map

2018 results map

2019 results map

2021 results map

2022 results map

2023 results map

2024 results map

2026 results map

== Mayoral elections ==
- North Tyneside Council mayoral election, 2002
- North Tyneside Council mayoral by-election, 2003
- North Tyneside Council mayoral election, 2005
- North Tyneside Council mayoral election, 2009
- North Tyneside Council mayoral election, 2013
- North Tyneside Council mayoral election, 2017
- North Tyneside Council mayoral election, 2021
- North Tyneside Council mayoral election, 2025

== By-election results ==
=== 1994-1998 ===
St Mary's by-election 1 May 1997
Party	Candidate	Votes	%	±%
Conservative	Ian Gordon	3,434	56.4	−5.7
Labour		1,752	28.8	+1.0
Liberal Democrats		785	12.9	+2.7
UKIP		113	1.9	+1.9
Majority		1,682	27.6	
Turnout		6,084		
Conservative hold		Swing		

Holystone by-election 22 May 1997
Party	Candidate	Votes	%	±%
Labour		1,354	59.3	
Conservative		481	21.1	
Liberal Democrats		373	16.3	
Independent		76	3.3	
Majority		873	38.2	
Turnout		2,284	23.8	
Labour hold		Swing		

=== 1998-2002 ===
Valley by-election 26 November 1998
Party	Candidate	Votes	%	±%
Labour		903	64.7	
Conservative		341	24.4	
Liberal Democrats		151	10.8	
Majority		562	40.3	
Turnout		1,395	19.5	
Labour hold		Swing		

Riverside by-election 11 March 1999
Party	Candidate	Votes	%	±%
Labour		692	79.6	−3.2
Conservative		177	20.4	+3.2
Majority		515	59.2	
Turnout		869	13.0	
Labour hold		Swing		

=== 2002-2006 ===
St Mary's by-election 27 June 2002
Party	Candidate	Votes	%	±%
Conservative	Pam McIntyre	2,019	83.2	+11.1
Labour		210	8.7	−3.6
Liberal Democrats		198	8.2	−7.4
Majority		1,809	74.5	
Turnout		2,427	33.0	
Conservative hold		Swing		

Seatonville by-election 27 June 2002
Party	Candidate	Votes	%	±%
Conservative	Ken Mewett	1,610	58.4	+10.8
Liberal Democrats		632	22.9	−5.4
Labour		476	17.3	−6.8
Independent		40	1.5	+1.5
Majority		978	35.5	
Turnout		2,758	38.0	
Conservative hold		Swing		

Tynemouth by-election 14 August 2003
Party	Candidate	Votes	%	±%
Conservative		1,533	73.2	+6.4
Labour		562	26.8	−6.4
Majority		971	46.4	+12.7
Turnout		2,095	30.8	−1.1
Conservative hold		Swing	+6.4	

Weetslade by-election 23 June 2005
Party	Candidate	Votes	%	±%
Conservative	Duncan McLellan	1,177	46.7	+3.1
Labour		998	39.6	−7.5
Liberal Democrats		347	13.7	+4.5
Majority		179	7.1	
Turnout		2,522	26.8	−18.42
Conservative gain from Labour		Swing	+5.3	

Preston by-election 6 October 2005
Party	Candidate	Votes	%	±%
Conservative	Linda Arkley	1,458	62.7	+3.2
Labour	Dan Jackson	722	31	−2.8
Liberal Democrats		146	6.3	−1.4
Majority		736	31.7	
Turnout		2,326	34.1	−8.47
Conservative hold		Swing	+3	

=== 2006-2010 ===
Benton by-election 28 September 2006
Party	Candidate	Votes	%	±%
Conservative	Patricia Greenwell	1,359	49.2	+2.5
Labour	Joanne Cassidy	1,191	43.2	+5.7
Liberal Democrats	Sarah Richards	210	7.6	−8.2
Majority		168	6.0	
Turnout		2,760	35.7	−8.9
Conservative hold		Swing	-1.6	

St Mary's by-election 5 July 2007
Party	Candidate	Votes	%	±%
Conservative	Judith Wallace	1,992	76.79	+3.15
Labour	Margaret Hall	363	13.99	+2.27
Liberal Democrats	David Banks	239	9.21	−5.43
Majority		1,629	62.8	+3.8
Turnout		2,594	37.6	−17.4
Conservative hold		Swing	+0.44	

Monkseaton North by-election 19 June 2008
Party	Candidate	Votes	%	±%
Conservative	Leslie Miller	1,617	69.6	+1.8
Labour	Glenn Stillaway	413	17.8	−1.5
Liberal Democrats	Eleanor Jellett	198	8.5	−4.4
Green	Martin Collins	94	4.0	+4.0
Majority		1,204	51.9	+3.5
Turnout		2,322	34.1	−11.1
Conservative hold		Swing	+3.3	

Tynemouth by-election 5 February 2009
Party	Candidate	Votes	%	±%
Conservative	David Wallace Lilly	1,538	62.2	−5.4
Labour	Jane Shaw	701	28.4	−4
Liberal Democrats	John Lewis Webb	233	9.4	+9.4
Majority		837	33.9	−1.4
Turnout		2,472	30.1	−12.6
Conservative hold		Swing	-0.7	

Preston by-election, 24 September 2009
Party	Candidate	Votes	%	±%
Conservative	David Sarin	1,141	55.8	−14.2
Labour	Kate Osborne	503	24.6	−5.3
Public Services not Private Profit	William Burnett	174	8.5	+8.5
Liberal Democrats	John Appleby	152	7.4	+7.4
Green	Susannah Rutherford	73	3.6	+3.6
Majority		638	31.2	−8.9
Turnout		2,043	29.8	−10.2
Conservative hold		Swing	-4.5	

=== 2010-2014 ===
Battle Hill by-election 30 September 2010
Party	Candidate	Votes	%	±%
Labour	Lesley Spillard	1,334	58	+11.2
Liberal Democrats	Dorothy Bradley	826	35.9	−1.5
Conservative	Wendy Morton	97	4.2	−5.6
Independent	Dan Ellis	46	2	+2
Majority		508	22.1	+16.7
Turnout		2,300	28.2	−33
Labour hold		Swing	+6.4	

Wallsend by-election 16 November 2012
Party	Candidate	Votes	%	±%
Liberal Democrats	Michael Huscroft	1,158	58.2	+10.4
Labour	Ron Bales	693	34.8	−13.2
Conservative	Barbara Bake	72	3.6	−0.6
Green	Martin Collins	66	3.3	+3.3
Majority		465	23.4	+23.2
Turnout		1,989	25.6	−3.7
Liberal Democrats gain from Labour		Swing	+11.8	

Riverside by-election 4 July 2013
Party	Candidate	Votes	%	±%
Labour	Wendy Lott	1,067	85.6	+1
Conservative	Barbara Ellen Stevens	179	14.4	−1
Majority		888	71.3	+2.1
Turnout		1,246	15.7	−9.4
Labour hold		Swing	+1	

=== 2018-2022 ===
Camperdown by-election 9 September 2021
Party	Candidate	Votes	%	±%
Labour	Tracy Hallway	957	66.7	
Conservative	David Lilly	352	24.5	
Green	Martin Collins	78	5.4	
Liberal Democrats	Nathan Shone	38	3.3	
Majority		605	42.2	
Turnout		1,435		
Labour hold		Swing		

=== 2022-2026 ===
Camperdown by-election 14 July 2022
Party	Candidate	Votes	%	±%
Labour	Peter Earley	873	59.0	
Conservative	Haylee Josendale	388	26.2	
Liberal Democrats	Jay Beyer	124	8.4	
Green	Michael Newton	58	3.9	
UKIP	Jack Thomson	36	2.4	
Majority		485	32.8	
Turnout		1,479		
Labour hold		Swing		

Killingworth by-election 2 July 2025
Party	Candidate	Votes	%	±%
Reform	Brian Smith	771	38.5	
Labour	Lucy Dixon	639	31.9	
Conservative	Alexander Amos	429	21.4	
Green	Ian Jones	85	4.2	
Liberal Democrats	Emma Vinton	81	4.0	
Majority		132	6.6	
Turnout		2,005		
Reform gain from Labour		Swing		

Longbenton and Benton by-election 2 July 2025
Party	Candidate	Votes	%	±%
Labour	Bryan Macdonald	739	39.6	
Reform	John Falkenstein	602	32.3	
Green	Jim Howard	259	13.9	
Liberal Democrats	David Nisbet	183	9.8	
Conservative	Joshua Clark	83	4.4	
Majority		137	7.3	
Turnout		1,866		
Labour hold		Swing		
