= 2015 North Tyneside Metropolitan Borough Council election =

2015 local election in England

Results of the 2015 North Tyneside Metropolitan Borough Council election

The 2015 North Tyneside Metropolitan Borough Council election took place on 7 May 2015 to one third of the members of North Tyneside Metropolitan Borough Council in England. This was on the same day as other local elections and the 2015 UK General Election.

All of the seats being contested were last contested in 2011, and these results are compared to the results of 2014.

== Result summary ==
North Tyneside Council Election Result 2015
Party	Seats	Gains	Losses	Net gain/loss	Seats %	Votes %	Votes	+/−
Labour	49	5	0	+5	81.6	51.8	51,475	+4.9
Conservative	9	0	3	-3	15.0	27.4	27,212	+2.3
UKIP	0	0	0	0	0.0	15.7	15,642	-5.4
Liberal Democrats	2	0	2	-2	3.4	2.9	2,880	-1.5
Green	0	0	0	0	0.0	1.9	1,845	+1.7
TUSC	0	0	0	0	0.0	0.1	261	-0.3
National Front	0	0	0	0	0.0	0.1	102	+0.1

== Council Composition ==
Prior to the election the composition of the council was:

↓
44	12	4
Labour	Conservative	Lib; Dem

After the election the composition of the council was:

↓
49	9	2
Labour	Conservative	Lib; Dem

== Candidates by party ==
20 / 20 20 / 20 3 / 20 1 / 20	20 / 20 5 / 20 3 / 20

There were a total of 72 candidates standing across the 20 seats - an average of 3.6 in each ward. The Labour Party, Conservative Party and UK Independence Party were all fielding a full slate of 20 candidates. The Green Party were fielding 5 candidates, whilst there were 3 candidates representing the Liberal Democrats and the Trade Unionist and Socialist Coalition respectively. 1 candidate was representing the National Front.

Since the last local election in 2014, the number of candidates representing Labour, the Conservatives, UKIP and the TUSC was unchanged. The Green Party had an increase of 4 candidates, the National Front an increase of 1 candidate, whilst the Liberal Democrats had a decrease of 4 candidates.

== Results by ward ==
The electoral division results listed below are based on the changes from the 2014 elections, not taking into account any mid-term by-elections or party defections.

=== Battle Hill ===
Battle Hill
Party	Candidate	Votes	%	±%
Labour	Lesley Spillard	3,033	60.4	+17.3
UKIP	Chris Croft	1,258	25.1	+5.7
Conservative	Lewis Austin	727	14.5	+6.7
Majority		1,775	35.4	+22.1
Turnout		5,018	60.5	+27.9
Labour hold		Swing	+5.8	

=== Benton ===
Benton
Party	Candidate	Votes	%	±%
Labour	Janet Hunter	2,950	55.3	+0.4
Conservative	Linda Arkley	1,440	27.0	+1.9
UKIP	Maureen Gallon	519	9.7	−7.7
Green	Mary Laver	349	6.5	+6.5
TUSC	Tim Wall	79	1.5	−1.1
Majority		1,510	28.3	−1.5
Turnout		5,337	67.8	+38.3
Labour hold		Swing	-0.8	

=== Camperdown ===
Camperdown
Party	Candidate	Votes	%	±%
Labour	Ray Glindon	2,915	64.1	+5.0
UKIP	Stew Hayes	842	18.5	−11.1
Conservative	Ian Wallace	790	17.4	+6.0
Majority		2,037	44.8	+15.3
Turnout		4,547	57.2	+27.7
Labour hold		Swing	+8.1	

=== Chirton ===
Chirton
Party	Candidate	Votes	%	±%
Labour	Norman Percy	2,658	63.9	+8.2
UKIP	Norman Morse	900	21.6	−4.8
Conservative	Carol Ayre	601	14.5	+4.0
Majority		1,758	42.3	+13.0
Turnout		4,159	49.6	+22.6
Labour hold		Swing	+6.5	

=== Collingwood ===
Collingwood
Party	Candidate	Votes	%	±%
Labour	Martin Rankin	2,575	48.8	+1.2
Conservative	Barbara Stevens	1,551	29.4	+6.6
UKIP	Katrina Harte	1,049	19.9	−3.2
TUSC	Dave Taws	101	1.9	−1.6
Majority		1,024	19.4	−6.1
Turnout		5,276	62.3	+26.5
Labour hold		Swing	-2.7	

=== Cullercoats ===
Cullercoats
Party	Candidate	Votes	%	±%
Labour	David McMeekan	2,242	39.7	+1.7
Conservative	George Westwater	2,218	39.3	−3.4
UKIP	Phyl Masters	736	13.0	−6.3
Green	Mark Adamson	371	6.7	+6.7
TUSC	John Hoare	81	1.4	+1.4
Majority		24	0.4	−4.3
Turnout		5,648	73.7	+28.7
Labour gain from Conservative		Swing	+2.6	

=== Howdon ===
Howdon
Party	Candidate	Votes	%	±%
Labour	John Harrison	2,890	67.3	+7.3
UKIP	Stephen Borlos	871	20.3	−9.9
Conservative	David Griffith-Owen	433	10.1	+4.5
National Front	Bob Batten	102	2.4	+2.4
Majority		2,019	47.0	+17.2
Turnout		4,296	52.8	+25.2
Labour hold		Swing	+8.6	

=== Killingworth ===
Killingworth
Party	Candidate	Votes	%	±%
Labour	Alison Waggott-Fairley	2,947	57.6	+2.4
Conservative	Karen Johnston	1,396	27.0	+6.0
UKIP	Brian Needham	794	15.4	−8.4
Majority		1,578	30.6	+9.2
Turnout		5,164	61.9	+28.5
Labour hold		Swing	-1.8	

=== Longbenton ===
Longbenton
Party	Candidate	Votes	%	±%
Labour	Karen Clark	2,978	62.1	−0.4
Conservative	Robin Underwood	765	15.9	+3.5
UKIP	Carl Dunn	733	15.3	−9.8
Green	Steve Manchee	321	6.7	+6.7
Majority		2,213	46.1	+8.7
Turnout		4,797	58.3	+26.8
Labour hold		Swing	-2.0	

=== Monkseaton North ===
Monkseaton North
Party	Candidate	Votes	%	±%
Conservative	Paul Mason	2,274	42.7	+0.8
Labour	William Samuel	1,865	35.0	−0.7
UKIP	Steve Symington	458	8.6	−7.4
Green	Richard Clarke	437	8.2	+8.2
Liberal Democrats	David Nisbet	290	5.4	−1.0
Majority		409	7.7	+1.5
Turnout		5,324	75.8	+33.6
Conservative hold		Swing	+0.8	

=== Monkseaton South ===
Monkseaton South
Party	Candidate	Votes	%	±%
Labour	Davey Drummond	2,285	42.0	−3.4
Conservative	Sean Brockbank	1,965	36.1	+0.1
UKIP	Gary Legg	824	15.1	−3.6
Green	Peter White	367	6.7	+6.7
Majority		320	5.9	−3.5
Turnout		5,441	71.2	+28.4
Labour hold		Swing	-1.8	

=== Northumberland ===
Northumberland
Party	Candidate	Votes	%	±%
Labour	Andy Newman	1,804	45.1	+8.7
Liberal Democrats	David Ord	1,201	30.0	−7.3
UKIP	Marcus Kitson	684	17.1	−5.6
Conservative	Miriam Smith	313	7.8	+4.2
Majority		603	15.1	+14.2
Turnout		4,002	59.0	+34.0
Labour gain from Liberal Democrats		Swing	+8.0	

=== Preston ===
Preston
Party	Candidate	Votes	%	±%
Labour	Pamela Brooks-Osborne	2,315	48.4	+5.1
Conservative	David Sarin	1,822	38.1	+1.6
UKIP	Peter Martin	649	13.6	−6.5
Majority		493	10.3	+3.5
Turnout		4,786	69.5	+30.6
Labour gain from Conservative		Swing	+3.4	

=== Riverside ===
Riverside
Party	Candidate	Votes	%	±%
Labour	Wendy Lott	2,741	63.3	+4.5
UKIP	Bob Sword	893	20.6	−7.4
Conservative	Maureen Jeffrey	687	15.9	+5.8
Majority		1,848	42.7	+11.9
Turnout		4,331	51.6	+22
Labour hold		Swing	+6.0	

=== St. Mary's ===
St. Mary's
Party	Candidate	Votes	%	±%
Conservative	Ed Hodson	3,205	58.4	−3.4
Labour	Graham Siddle	1,596	29.1	+9.5
UKIP	William Jackson	685	12.5	+1.2
Majority		1,609	29.3	−12.8
Turnout		5,486	79.3	+37.2
Conservative hold		Swing	-6.5	

=== Tynemouth ===
Tynemouth
Party	Candidate	Votes	%	±%
Labour	Karen Bolger	2,884	47.0	+2.7
Conservative	Jean McLaughlin	2,597	42.3	−0.9
UKIP	Henry Marshall	661	10.7	−1.8
Majority		287	4.7	+3.7
Turnout		6,142	71.8	+37.8
Labour gain from Conservative		Swing	+1.8	

=== Valley ===
Valley
Party	Candidate	Votes	%	±%
Labour	Carole Burdis	3,061	59.7	+3.1
Conservative	Joseph Furness	1,133	22.1	+7.0
UKIP	Peter Bayliss	937	18.3	−10.0
Majority		1,928	37.6	+9.3
Turnout		5,131	59.3	+29.8
Labour hold		Swing	-2.1	

=== Wallsend ===
Wallsend
Party	Candidate	Votes	%	±%
Labour	Matthew Thirlaway	2,138	48.1	+10.5
Liberal Democrats	Margaret Finlay	1,389	31.3	−4.0
UKIP	Mark Bickerton	604	13.6	−4.5
Conservative	Claire Griffith-Owen	312	7.0	+3.5
Majority		749	16.9	+14.6
Turnout		4,443	57.2	+25.9
Labour gain from Liberal Democrats		Swing	+7.3	

=== Weetslade ===
Weetslade
Party	Candidate	Votes	%	±%
Labour	Muriel Green	2,727	53.7	+5.3
Conservative	Andrew Elliott	1,316	25.9	+3.8
UKIP	Irene Davidson	1,036	20.4	−7.7
Majority		1,411	17.8	+2.5
Turnout		5,079	64.7	+25.2
Labour hold		Swing	+0.8	

=== Whitley Bay ===
Whitley Bay
Party	Candidate	Votes	%	±%
Labour	John O'Shea	2,871	56.9	+4.7
Conservative	Frank Austin	1,667	33.0	+4.5
UKIP	Dave Cory	509	10.1	−2.6
Majority		1,204	23.9	+1.2
Turnout		5,047	68.2	+27.5
Labour hold		Swing	+0.1	

Preceded by 2014 North Tyneside Council election	North Tyneside local elections	Succeeded by 2016 North Tyneside Metropolitan Borough Council election
