= 2010 North Tyneside Metropolitan Borough Council election =

2010 UK local government election

Results of the 2010 North Tyneside Metropolitan Borough Council election

Elections to North Tyneside Metropolitan Council took place on 6 May 2010 on the same day as other council elections in England and the UK general election.

North Tyneside Council is elected "in thirds" which means one councillor from each three-member ward is elected each year with a fourth year when the mayoral election takes place.

One third of the councillors were elected in 2006. The Conservative Party gained an overall majority of one on the council after the 2008 election which previously had been under no overall control, and also won the following mayoral election, in which Linda Arkley returned to office. The 2010 election proved victorious for the Labour Party, which gained 8 seats and lost none. The Conservatives lost 7 seats and the Liberal Democrats lost one. The Council returned to no overall control as the Conservatives lost their majority and fell into second place. The swing across the council on average was 10.7% from the Conservatives to Labour, against the national trend of the Westminster elections taking place the same day.

North Tyneside Council election result 2010
Party	Seats	Gains	Losses	Net gain/loss	Seats %	Votes %	Votes	+/−
Labour	29	8	0	+8	48.3	49.1	48,272	+11.6%
Conservative	24	0	7	-7	40	32.5	31,897	-9.7%
Liberal Democrats	7	0	1	-1	11.7	15.1	14,831	-0.5%
Green	0	0	0	0	0	1.3	1,296	+1.1%
BNP	0	0	0	0	0	1.2	1,209	-0.9%
National Front	0	0	0	0	0	0.57	562	+0.15%
English Democrat	0	0	0	0	0	0.21	206	+0.21%

== Battle Hill ==
North Tyneside Council elections: Battle Hill ward 2010
Party	Candidate	Votes	%	±%
Labour	David McGarr	2,335	46.8	+10.3
Liberal Democrats	Dorothy Bradley	2,065	41.4	−11.9
Conservative	Ian Wallace	586	11.8	+11.8
Majority		270	5.4	−11.1
Turnout		4,986	61.2	+23.3
Labour gain from Liberal Democrats		Swing	+11.1	

A further by-election was held in September 2010. Details can be found here.

== Benton ==
North Tyneside Council elections: Benton ward 2010
Party	Candidate	Votes	%	±%
Labour	Stuart Hill	2,444	46.6	+5.5
Conservative	Philip Wilson	1,799	34.3	−15.8
Liberal Democrats	Clare Barton	1,002	19.1	+9.6
Majority		645	12.3	+2.6
Turnout		5,245	66.7	+19.9
Labour gain from Conservative		Swing	+10.7	

== Camperdown ==
North Tyneside Council elections: Camperdown ward 2010
Party	Candidate	Votes	%	±%
Labour	Ann Arkle	2,675	58.5	+5.5
Conservative	Martyn Peggs	814	17.8	−5
Liberal Democrats	Robert Watson	746	16.3	+6.9
BNP	Gordon Steel	313	6.8	−7.9
Majority		1,861	40.7	+10.3
Turnout		4,574	58.1	+25.5
Labour hold		Swing	+5.8	

== Chirton ==
North Tyneside Council elections: Chirton ward 2010
Party	Candidate	Votes	%	±%
Labour	Amanda Normand	3,375	77.4	+23
Conservative	Edith Furness	988	22.6	−7.4
Majority		2,387	54.7	+30.3
Turnout		4,363	53.3	+22.7
Labour hold		Swing	+15.2	

== Collingwood ==
North Tyneside Council elections: Collingwood ward 2010
Party	Candidate	Votes	%	±%
Labour	Steven Cox	3,196	62.2	+19.6
Conservative	Jules Emberton	2,120	37.8	−19.6
Majority		1,076	20.1	+5.3
Turnout		5,316	65.3	+25.5
Labour gain from Conservative		Swing	+19.6	

== Cullercoats ==
North Tyneside Council elections: Cullercoats ward 2010
Party	Candidate	Votes	%	±%
Conservative	Kenneth Barrie	2,741	48.2	−25.4
Labour	Keith Smiles	2,436	42.8	+16.4
Green	Malcolm Scott	510	9	+9
Majority		305	5.4	−41.8
Turnout		5,687	76	+26
Conservative hold		Swing	-20.9	

== Howdon ==
North Tyneside Council elections: Howdon ward 2010
Party	Candidate	Votes	%	±%
Labour	Maureen Madden	2,424	56.3	−2.1
Liberal Democrats	Paul Moat	1,105	25.7	−20.1
Conservative	Leon Rodda	433	10.1	+10.1
National Front	Bob Batten	345	7.9	+7.9
Majority		1,319	30.6	+22.1
Turnout		4,307	56.3	+24.9
Labour hold		Swing	+9	

== Killingworth ==
North Tyneside Council elections: Killingworth ward 2010
Party	Candidate	Votes	%	±%
Labour	Linda Darke	2,445	49.8	+9.5
Conservative	Paul Bunyan	1,570	32	−16.4
Liberal Democrats	Norma Playle	893	18.2	+6.9
Majority		875	17.8	+9.8
Turnout		4,908	65.5	+26.9
Labour hold		Swing	+13	

== Longbenton ==
North Tyneside Council elections: Longbenton ward 2010
Party	Candidate	Votes	%	±%
Labour	Joan Walker	2,530	54.2	−10.3
Liberal Democrats	Ronald Fletcher	965	20.7	+20.7
Conservative	Robin Underwood	746	16	−8.1
National Front	Mark Nicholls	217	4.5	−6.9
English Democrat	Martin Thompson	206	4.4	+4.4
Majority		1,565	33.6	−6.8
Turnout		4,664	57.5	+20.8
Labour hold		Swing	-15.5	

== Monkseaton North ==
North Tyneside Council elections: Monkseaton North ward 2010
Party	Candidate	Votes	%	±%
Conservative	Leslie Miller	2,464	46.6	−23
Labour	Glenn Stillaway	1,745	33	+15.2
Liberal Democrats	Eleanor Jellett	1,084	20.5	+12
Majority		719	13.6	−38.3
Turnout		5,293	76.5	+52.4
Conservative hold		Swing	-19.1	

== Monkseaton South ==
North Tyneside Council elections: Monkseaton South ward 2010
Party	Candidate	Votes	%	±%
Labour	Ian Grayson	2,403	43.4	+3.8
Conservative	Frank Austin	1,880	40	−12.2
Liberal Democrats	Charles Hall	869	15.7	+7.5
BNP	Dorothy Brooke	224	4	+4
Green	Julia Erskine	157	2.8	+2.8
Majority		523	9.5	−3.2
Turnout		5,533	81.3	+32
Labour gain from Conservative		Swing	+8	

== Northumberland ==
North Tyneside Council elections: Northumberland ward 2010
Party	Candidate	Votes	%	±%
Liberal Democrats	Marian Huscroft	2,035	50.7	−15.3
Labour	Alan Keith	1,509	37.6	+13.4
Conservative	Barbara Bake	468	11.7	+1.9
Majority		526	13.1	−28.7
Turnout		4,012	59.3	+20.6
Liberal Democrats hold		Swing	-14.4	

== Preston ==
North Tyneside Council elections: Preston ward 2010
Party	Candidate	Votes	%	±%
Labour	Kate Osborne	2,529	51.7	+27.1
Conservative	Susan Rodgerson	2,367	48.3	−7.5
Majority		162	3.3	−27.9
Turnout		4,896	71.4	+41.6
Labour gain from Conservative		Swing	+17.3	

== Riverside ==
North Tyneside Council elections: Riverside ward 2010
Party	Candidate	Votes	%	±%
Labour	Bruce Pickard	2,220	54.6	+1.7
Liberal Democrats	Andy Hudson	1,058	26	+2.8
Conservative	Brian Steward	791	19.4	+3.1
Majority		1,162	28.6	−1.1
Turnout		4,069	51	+17.2
Labour hold		Swing	-0.6	

== St Mary's ==
North Tyneside Council elections: St Mary's ward 2010
Party	Candidate	Votes	%	±%
Conservative	Pam McIntyre	3,665	67.4	−16
Labour	Patricia Crowe	1,363	25.1	+8.5
Green	Susie Rutherford	407	7.5	+7.5
Majority		2,302	42.4	−24.5
Turnout		5,435	78.8	+24
Conservative hold		Swing	-12.3	

== Tynemouth ==
North Tyneside Council elections: Tynemouth ward 2010
Party	Candidate	Votes	%	±%
Labour	Sarah Day	3,040	51.2	+22.8
Conservative	Ian Macaulay	2,896	48.8	−13.4
Majority		144	2.4	−21.5
Turnout		5,936	72.3	+42.2
Labour gain from Conservative		Swing	+18.1	

== Valley ==
North Tyneside Council elections: Valley ward 2010
Party	Candidate	Votes	%	±%
Labour	Brian Burdis	2,999	63.2	+18.7
Conservative	Joanne Johnson	1,232	26	+1
BNP	John Burrows	513	10.8	−0.5
Majority		1,767	37.2	+17.7
Turnout		4,744	61	+22.2
Labour hold		Swing	+8.9	

== Wallsend ==
North Tyneside Council elections: Wallsend ward 2010
Party	Candidate	Votes	%	±%
Liberal Democrats	Margaret Finlay	1,987	45	−15.9
Labour	Gary Bell	1,742	39.5	+18.3
Conservative	Miriam Smith	461	10.4	+3.5
Green	Martin Collins	222	5	+5
Majority		245	5.6	−34.1
Turnout		4,412	57.6	+17.9
Liberal Democrats hold		Swing	-17.1	

== Weetslade ==
North Tyneside Council elections: Weetslade ward 2010
Party	Candidate	Votes	%	±%
Labour	Alex Cowie	2,944	58.6	+17.3
Conservative	George Westwater	2,076	41.4	−6
Majority		868	17.3	+11.2
Turnout		5,020	67.3	+19
Labour gain from Conservative		Swing	+11.7	

== Whitley Bay ==
North Tyneside Council elections: Whitley Bay ward 2010
Party	Candidate	Votes	%	±%
Labour	Pamela Brooks	1,918	39.4	+4.7
Conservative	Paul Mason	1,800	36.9	−28.4
Liberal Democrats	John Webb	995	20.4	+20.4
BNP	Jeff Rutherford	159	3.3	+3.3
Majority		118	2.4	−28.5
Turnout		4,872	69.8	+29.8
Labour gain from Conservative		Swing	+16.6	

Preceded by 2009 North Tyneside Council mayoral election	North Tyneside local elections	Succeeded by 2011 North Tyneside Council election
