= 2003 North Tyneside Metropolitan Borough Council election =

2003 UK local government election

Elections to North Tyneside Metropolitan Council took place on 1 May 2003 on the same day as other local council elections in England.

North Tyneside Council is elected "in thirds" which means one councilor from each three-member ward is elected each year with a third year when the mayoral election takes place.

There was also a mayoral by-election held, which was won by Linda Arkley of the Conservative Party, after Chris Morgan was forced to resign due to allegations of possessing indecent images of children on his computer. He was subsequently cleared of all charges.

North Tyneside Council election result 2003
Party	Seats	Gains	Losses	Net gain/loss	Seats %	Votes %	Votes	+/−
Labour	31	0	2	-2	51.6	42.7	19,825	unknown
Conservative	21	2	0	+2	35	37.8	17,556	unknown
Liberal Democrats	7	0	0	0	11.6	18.9	8,782	unknown
Independent	0	0	0	0	0	0.5	257	unknown

== Mayoral by-election ==
Mayor of North Tyneside by-election 12 June 2003
Party	Candidate	1st round		2nd round			1st round votesTransfer votes, 2nd round
Party	Candidate	Total	Of round	Transfers	Total	Of round	1st round votesTransfer votes, 2nd round
Conservative	Linda Arkley	18,478	43.1%	2,750	21,228		
Labour	Gordon Adam	13,070	30.5%	3,357	16,427		
Liberal Democrats	Michael Huscroft	8,404	19.8%				
BNP	Robert Batten	2,554	6.0%				
Socialist Alliance	Louise van der Hoeven	400	0.9%				
Conservative hold							

== Council election by ward ==
=== Battle Hill ===
North Tyneside Council election: Battle Hill ward 2003
Party	Candidate	Votes	%	±%
Labour	Mary Glindon	1,505	55.6	
Liberal Democrats	Margaret Finlay	989	36.5	
Conservative	Nigel Clothier	212	7.8	
Majority		516	19.1	
Turnout		2,706	33.8	

=== Benton ===
North Tyneside Council election: Benton ward 2003
Party	Candidate	Votes	%	±%
Labour	Janet Hunter	1,189	50.7	
Conservative	Brian McArdle	864	36.8	
Liberal Democrats	Mark Finlay	292	12.5	
Majority		325	4.02	
Turnout		2,345	30.51	

=== Camperdown ===
North Tyneside Council election: Camperdown ward 2003
Party	Candidate	Votes	%	±%
Labour	James Allan	1,263	72.2	
Liberal Democrats	Malcolm Smith	251	14.4	
Conservative	Amanda Newton	235	13.4	
Majority		1,012	57.9	
Turnout		1,749	23.07	

=== Chirton ===
North Tyneside Council election: Chirton ward 2003
Party	Candidate	Votes	%	±%
Labour	John Stirling	992	75	
Conservative	Toni Morgan	330	25	
Majority		662	50.1	
Turnout		1,322	18.7	

=== Collingwood ===
North Tyneside Council election: Collingwood ward 2003
Party	Candidate	Votes	%	±%
Labour	Steven Cox	1,207	64.1	
Conservative	Miriam Smith	370	19.6	
Liberal Democrats	Dorothy Hindmarsh	306	16.3	
Majority		837	44.5	
Turnout		1,883	23.2	

=== Cullercoats ===
North Tyneside Council election: Cullercoats ward 2003
Party	Candidate	Votes	%	±%
Conservative	Shirley Mortimer	2,069	58	
Labour	Keith Smiles	1,168	32.8	
Liberal Democrats	Dennis Woods	328	9.2	
Majority		901	25.3	
Turnout		3,565	47.8	

=== Holystone ===
North Tyneside Council election: Holystone ward 2003
Party	Candidate	Votes	%	±%
Labour	David McGarr	1,449	57.1	
Conservative	David Hatfield	687	27.1	
Liberal Democrats	Steven Conoboy	427	16.8	
Majority		762	30	
Turnout		2,536		

=== Howdon ===
North Tyneside Council election: Howdon ward 2003
Party	Candidate	Votes	%	±%
Labour	Francis Lott	1,002	62.2	
Liberal Democrats	Elizabeth Taylor	502	31.2	
Conservative	John McGee	106	6.6	
Majority		500	31.1	
Turnout		1,610	21	

=== Longbenton ===
North Tyneside Council election: Longbenton ward 2003
Party	Candidate	Votes	%	±%
Labour	Edward Darke	1,003	70.6	
Liberal Democrats	Kenneth McGarrigle	225	15.8	
Conservative	Robin Underwood	192	13.5	
Majority		776	54.8	
Turnout		1,420	19.5	

=== Monkseaton ===
North Tyneside Council election: Monkseaton ward 2003
Party	Candidate	Votes	%	±%
Conservative	Karen Johnston	1,862	61.5	
Labour	Glen Stillaway	676	22.3	
Liberal Democrats	Alison Campbell	488	16.1	
Majority		1,186	39.2	
Turnout		3,026		

=== North Shields ===
North Tyneside Council election: North Shields ward 2003
Party	Candidate	Votes	%	±%
Conservative	James Rutherford	1,656	55	
Labour	Rowland Hill	1,028	34.1	
Liberal Democrats	Clare Hindmarsh	329	10.9	
Majority		628	20.8	
Turnout		3,013		

=== Northumberland ===
North Tyneside Council election: Northumberland ward 2003
Party	Candidate	Votes	%	±%
Liberal Democrats	Graeme Brett	1,647	66.5	
Labour	Norma Playle	689	27.8	
Conservative	Marjorie Appleton	139	5.6	
Majority		958	38.7	
Turnout		2,475	38.6	

=== Riverside ===
North Tyneside Council election: Riverside ward 2003
Party	Candidate	Votes	%	±%
Labour	John Lowther	1,007	68.2	
Liberal Democrats	James Smith	250	16.9	
Conservative	Roderick Godwin	220	14.9	
Majority		757	51.3	
Turnout		1,477	22.1	

=== Seatonville ===
North Tyneside Council election: Seatonville ward 2003
Party	Candidate	Votes	%	±%
Conservative	John Lowther	1,375	52.2	
Liberal Democrats	Dr Joan Harvey	527	20	
Labour	Thomas Mulvenna	477	18.1	
Independent	George Partis	257	9.7	
Majority		848	32.2	
Turnout		2,636		

=== St Mary's ===
North Tyneside Council election: Seatonville ward 2003
Party	Candidate	Votes	%	±%
Conservative	Marguerite Hall	2,294	73.2	
Labour	Mark Ormston	435	13.9	
Liberal Democrats	Iain Campbell	405	12.9	
Majority		1,859	59.3	
Turnout		3,134	45.5	

=== Tynemouth ===
North Tyneside Council election: Tynemouth ward 2003
Party	Candidate	Votes	%	±%
Conservative	Diane Page	1,752	66.8	
Labour	Arthur Lowe	869	33.2	
Majority		883	33.6	
Turnout		2,621	31.9	

A further by-election was held on 14 August 2003. Details of this can be found here.

=== Valley ===
North Tyneside Council election: Valley ward 2003
Party	Candidate	Votes	%	±%
Labour	Brian Burdis	1,086	56.5	
Conservative	Frank Austin	503	26.2	
Liberal Democrats	John Bradley	332	17.4	
Majority		583	30.3	
Turnout		1,921	30	

=== Wallsend ===
North Tyneside Council election: Wallsend ward 2003
Party	Candidate	Votes	%	±%
Liberal Democrats	Nigel Huscroft	1,084	57.6	
Labour	Alan Keith	686	36.5	
Conservative	Margaret Smith	111	5.9	
Majority		398	21.1	
Turnout		1,881	26.4	

=== Weetslade ===
North Tyneside Council election: Weetslade ward 2003
Party	Candidate	Votes	%	±%
Labour	Muriel Green	1,296	45.4	
Conservative	Alan Appleton	1,158	40.6	
Liberal Democrats	Raymond Taylor	400	14	
Majority		138	4.8	
Turnout		2,854	38.1	

=== Whitley Bay ===
North Tyneside Council election: Whitley Bay ward 2003
Party	Candidate	Votes	%	±%
Conservative	Alison Austin	1,421	62	
Labour	John Webb	798	38	
Majority		623	27.2	
Turnout		2,291	32.9	

Preceded by 2002 North Tyneside Metropolitan Borough Council election	North Tyneside local elections	Succeeded by 2004 North Tyneside Metropolitan Borough Council election
