= 2006 North Tyneside Metropolitan Borough Council election =

2006 UK local government election

← 2004	4 May 2006	2007 →

20 of the 60 seats on North Tyneside Metropolitan Borough Council 31 seats needed for a majority
	First party	Second party	Third party
Party	Conservative	Labour	Liberal Democrats
Seats won	10	7	3
Seats after	28	23	8
Seat change	Steady	Steady	▲1
Popular vote	23,339	22,095	9,014
Percentage	40.7%	38.5%	15.7%
Swing	▲5.8%	▲3.0%	▼8.8%
- Map of the 2006 North Tyneside council election. Labour in red, Conservatives in blue and Liberal Democrats in yellow.
Council control before election
No overall control
Council control after election
No overall control

Elections to North Tyneside Metropolitan Council took place on 4 May 2006 on the same day as other local council elections in England.

North Tyneside Council is elected "in thirds" which means one councillor from each three-member ward is elected each year for the first three years with a fourth year when the mayoral election takes place.

North Tyneside Council election result 2006
Party	Seats	Gains	Losses	Net gain/loss	Seats %	Votes %	Votes	+/−
Conservative	28	0	0	0	46.6	40.7	23,339	-0.1
Labour	23	1	1	0	38.3	38.5	22,093	-1.5
Liberal Democrats	8	1	0	+1	13.3	15.7	9,014	-0.8
Independent	1	0	1	-1	1.6	3.8	2,154	+2.0
BNP	0	0	0	0	0.0	1.3	757	+0.6

== Battle Hill ==
North Tyneside Council elections: Battle Hill ward 2006
Party	Candidate	Votes	%	±%
Liberal Democrats	Dorothy Bradley	1,376	46.11	+2.91
Labour	Raymond Glindon	1,256	42.09	−0.61
BNP	Gladys Dobinson	352	11.79	+8.09
Majority		120	4.02	
Turnout		2,984	37.27	−5.2
Liberal Democrats gain from Labour		Swing	+1.76	

== Benton ==
North Tyneside Council elections: Benton ward 2006
Party	Candidate	Votes	%	±%
Conservative	Jean Murray	1,601	46.7	+2
Labour	Joanne Cassidy	1,285	37.48	−6.12
Liberal Democrats	Mark Finlay	542	15.81	+7.21
Majority		316	9.21	
Turnout		3,428	44.6	+2.13
Conservative hold		Swing	+4.06	

A further by-election was held on 28 September 2006. Details of this can be found here.

== Camperdown ==
North Tyneside Council elections: Camperdown ward 2006
Party	Candidate	Votes	%	±%
Labour	Jayne Shotton	1,327	56.6	−3.1
Conservative	Patricia Greenwell	612	26.1	+7.1
BNP	Charles Steel	405	17.3	+12.8
Majority		715	30.5	
Turnout		2,344	30.94	+0.68
Labour hold		Swing	-5.1	

== Chirton ==
North Tyneside Council elections: Chirton ward 2006
Party	Candidate	Votes	%	±%
Labour	Amanda Normand	1,176	54.5	+8.4
Independent	Sandy Carter	982	45.5	N/A
Majority		194	9	
Turnout		2,158	30.45	+0.22
Labour gain from Independent		Swing	-18.5	

== Collingwood ==
North Tyneside Council elections: Collingwood ward 2006
Party	Candidate	Votes	%	±%
Conservative	Charles Hobkirk	1,496	45.7	−1.1
Labour	Margaret Hall	1,293	39.5	−6.6
Liberal Democrats	Clare Hindmarsh	484	14.8	+7.7
Majority		203	6.2	
Turnout		3,273	40.31	−0.72
Conservative hold		Swing	+2.75	

== Cullercoats ==
North Tyneside Council elections: Cullercoats ward 2006
Party	Candidate	Votes	%	±%
Conservative	Jon Jo Macnamara	2,736	72.8	+4.1
Labour	Margaret Rowley	1,024	27.2	+3.8
Majority		1,712	45.5	
Turnout		3,760	50.44	+0.94
Conservative hold		Swing	+0.15	

== Howdon ==
North Tyneside Council elections: Howdon ward 2006
Party	Candidate	Votes	%	±%
Labour	Maureen Madden	1,287	52.3	+0.8
Liberal Democrats	John Croney	1,174	47.7	+9.9
Majority		113	4.6	
Turnout		2,461	32.17	−0.22
Labour hold		Swing	-4.55	

== Killingworth ==
North Tyneside Council elections: Killingworth ward 2006
Party	Candidate	Votes	%	±%
Labour	Linda Darke	1,183	43.8	−3.3
Conservative	Edward Moss	1,165	43.2	−1.2
Liberal Democrats	Patricia Dawson	350	13	+4.5
Majority		18	0.7	
Turnout		2,698	36.6	+2.39
Labour hold		Swing	-1.05	

== Longbenton ==
North Tyneside Council elections: Longbenton ward 2006
Party	Candidate	Votes	%	±%
Labour	Joan Walker	1,797	73.3	+13.6
Conservative	Robin Underwood	654	26.7	+13.6
Majority		1,143	46.5	
Turnout		2,451	33.66	+2
Labour hold		Swing	0	

== Monkseaton North ==
North Tyneside Council elections: Monkseaton North ward 2006
Party	Candidate	Votes	%	±%
Conservative	William Jackson	1,955	62.2	−4.4
Labour	Jane Shaw	667	21.2	−3.7
Liberal Democrats	Eleanor Jellett	519	16.5	+8.2
Majority		1,288	41	
Turnout		3,141	46.05	+0.67
Conservative hold		Swing	-0.35	

== Monkseaton South ==
North Tyneside Council elections: Monkseaton South ward 2006
Party	Candidate	Votes	%	±%
Conservative	Frank Austin	1,662	50.4	−10.1
Labour	Ian Grayson	889	27	−2.1
Liberal Democrats	Peter Berrie	536	16.3	+6
Independent	George Partis	209	6.3	+6.3
Majority		773	23.5	
Turnout		3,296	45.29	+1.85
Conservative hold		Swing	-4	

== Northumberland ==
North Tyneside Council elections: Northumberland ward 2006
Party	Candidate	Votes	%	±%
Liberal Democrats	Marian Huscroft	1,456	64.1	−6.9
Labour	Kenneth McBeth	594	26.2	+4.8
Conservative	Miriam Smith	221	9.7	+2
Majority		862	38	
Turnout		2,271	35.38	−3.78
Liberal Democrats hold		Swing	-5.85	

== Preston ==
North Tyneside Council elections: Preston ward 2006
Party	Candidate	Votes	%	±%
Conservative	Simon Button	1,803	63.2	+0.5
Labour	Daniel Jackson	1,052	36.8	+5.8
Majority		751	26.3	−5.4
Turnout		2,855	41.71	−7.61
Conservative hold		Swing	-2.65	

== Riverside ==
North Tyneside Council elections: Riverside ward 2006
Party	Candidate	Votes	%	±%
Labour	Charles Pickard	1,132	54	−1.7
Independent	John Carter	963	46	+27.2
Majority		169	8.1	
Turnout		2,095	31.34	+1.89
Labour hold		Swing	-14.45	

== St Mary's ==
North Tyneside Council elections: St Mary's ward 2006
Party	Candidate	Votes	%	±%
Conservative	Pamela McIntyre	3,114	84	+8
Labour	Thomas Mulvenna	593	16	−1
Majority		2,521	68	
Turnout		3,707	53.77	−0.5
Conservative hold		Swing	+3.5	

== Tynemouth ==
North Tyneside Council elections: Tynemouth ward 2006
Party	Candidate	Votes	%	±%
Conservative	Ian Macaulay	2,312	65.6	+4.1
Labour	David Corkey	1,214	34.4	+4.2
Majority		1,098	31.1	
Turnout		3,526	42.97	+0.06
Conservative hold		Swing	-0.05	

== Valley ==
North Tyneside Council elections: Valley ward 2006
Party	Candidate	Votes	%	±%
Labour	Brian Burdis	1,285	63.1	−5.1
Conservative	Louise Partis	752	36.9	+10
Majority		533	26.2	
Turnout		2,037	31.76	+0.36
Labour hold		Swing	-7.55	

== Wallsend ==
North Tyneside Council elections: Wallsend ward 2006
Party	Candidate	Votes	%	±%
Liberal Democrats	Margaret Finlay	1,474	60	+0.7
Labour	Gary Madden	756	30.8	+1.3
Conservative	Jayne Fleet	225	9.7	+2.5
Majority		718	29.2	
Turnout		2,455	34.47	−7.84
Liberal Democrats hold		Swing	-0.3	

== Weetslade ==
North Tyneside Council elections: Weetslade ward 2006
Party	Candidate	Votes	%	±%
Conservative	George Westwater	1,530	44.1	−2.6
Labour	Richard Schofield	1,331	38.4	−1.2
Liberal Democrats	Raymond Taylor	606	17.5	+3.8
Majority		199	5.7	−1.4
Turnout		3,467	46.24	+19.44
Conservative hold		Swing	-0.7	

== Whitley Bay ==
North Tyneside Council elections: Whitley Bay ward 2006
Party	Candidate	Votes	%	±%
Conservative	Margaret Marshall	1,501	50.9	−3
Labour	Sandra Graham	952	32.3	−5.8
Liberal Democrats	John Webb	497	16.8	+8.5
Majority		549	18.6	
Turnout		2,950	42.31	−0.28
Conservative hold		Swing	+1.4	

Preceded by 2005 North Tyneside Council mayoral election	North Tyneside local elections	Succeeded by 2007 North Tyneside Council election
