= 2012 North Tyneside Metropolitan Borough Council election =

2012 UK local government election

Results of the 2012 North Tyneside Metropolitan Borough Council election

Elections for the North Tyneside Metropolitan Council took place on 3 May 2012.

North Tyneside Council is elected in thirds, which means one councillor from each three-member ward is elected each year except for every fourth year, when the mayoral election takes place.

One third of the councillors were elected in 2008.

North Tyneside Council Election Result 2012
Party	Seats	Gains	Losses	Net gain/loss	Seats %	Votes %	Votes	+/−
Labour	44	9	0	+9	73.3	58.1	30,105	+3.8%
Conservative	12	0	7	-7	20	34.2	17,723	+0.6%
Liberal Democrats	4	0	2	-2	6.6	7.3	3,801	-3.1%
National Front	0	0	0	0	0	0.43	224	-0.32%

== Resulting Political Composition ==
Party	Seats			Council Composition 3 May 2012
Party	2010	2011	2012	Council Composition 3 May 2012
Labour	29	35	44	
Conservative	24	19	12	
Liberal Democrats	7	6	4	

Between October 2012 and November 2013, a Liberal Democrat candidate won a by-election and a Labour Councillor became Independent. The Council composition was therefore:

Party	Seats		Council Composition 1 December 2013
Party	2012	2013	Council Composition 1 December 2013
Labour	44	42	
Conservative	12	12	
Liberal Democrats	4	5	
Independent	0	1	

== Battle Hill ==
North Tyneside Council Elections: Battle Hill ward 2012
Party	Candidate	Votes	%	±%
Labour	Carl Johnson	1,556	59.5	−4.8
Liberal Democrats	Chris Croft	883	33.8	−2.4
Conservative	Alan Furness	175	6.7	+6.7
Majority		673	25.7	−1.3
Turnout		2,614	32	−5.7
Labour gain from Liberal Democrats		Swing	-1.2	

== Benton ==
North Tyneside Council Elections: Benton ward 2012
Party	Candidate	Votes	%	±%
Labour	Pat Oliver	1,991	65.4	+11.5
Conservative	Matt Galley	1,054	34.6	−7.6
Majority		937	30.8	+19.1
Turnout		3,045	39	−10
Labour gain from Conservative		Swing	+9.6	

== Camperdown ==
North Tyneside Council Elections: Camperdown ward 2012
Party	Candidate	Votes	%	±%
Labour	Jim Allan	1,747	83.2	+7.1
Conservative	Andrew Elliott	353	16.8	−7.1
Majority		1,394	66.4	+25.7
Turnout		2,100	27.1	−5.9
Labour hold		Swing	+7.1	

== Chirton ==
North Tyneside Council Elections: Chirton ward 2012
Party	Candidate	Votes	%	±%
Labour	John Stirling	1,571	80	+3.9
Conservative	Susan Rodgerson	393	20	−3.9
Majority		1,178	60	+7.9
Turnout		1,964	23.9	−5.6
Labour hold		Swing	+3.9	

== Collingwood ==
North Tyneside Council Elections: Collingwood ward 2012
Party	Candidate	Votes	%	±%
Labour	Jeanette Pickard	1,804	65	+2.8
Conservative	Sean Brockbank	972	35	+1.5
Majority		832	30	+7.9
Turnout		2,776	34.8	−7.7
Labour gain from Conservative		Swing	+0.7	

== Cullercoats ==
North Tyneside Council Elections: Cullercoats ward 2012
Party	Candidate	Votes	%	±%
Conservative	Shirley Mortimer	1,779	54.6	+2.6
Labour	Ron Bales	1,480	45.4	−2.6
Majority		299	9.2	+5.1
Turnout		3,259	44	−7.7
Conservative hold		Swing	+2.6	

== Howdon ==
North Tyneside Council Elections: Howdon ward 2012
Party	Candidate	Votes	%	±%
Labour	John Hunter	1,632	76.3	+4.3
National Front	Bob Batten	224	10.5	−0.8
Liberal Democrats	Colin Finlay	167	7.8	−8.9
Conservative	Raymond Taylor	115	5.4	+5.4
Majority		1,408	65.9	+10.6
Turnout		2,138	25.5	−5.7
Labour hold		Swing	+1.8	

== Killingworth ==
North Tyneside Council Elections: Killingworth ward 2012
Party	Candidate	Votes	%	±%
Labour	Gary Bell	1,660	64.7	+8
Conservative	Paul Bunyan	906	35.3	−2.9
Majority		754	29.4	+10.8
Turnout		2,566	32.6	−9.3
Labour gain from Conservative		Swing	+5.5	

== Longbenton ==
North Tyneside Council Elections: Longbenton ward 2012
Party	Candidate	Votes	%	±%
Labour	Eddie Darke	1,897	84.8	+12.8
Conservative	Robin Underwood	341	15.2	−4.4
Majority		1,556	69.5	+16.1
Turnout		2,238	27.9	−6.8
Labour hold		Swing	+8.6	

== Monkseaton North ==
North Tyneside Council Elections: Monkseaton North ward 2012
Party	Candidate	Votes	%	±%
Conservative	Alison Austin	1,525	56.5	0
Labour	Glenn Stillaway	978	36.2	+1.3
Liberal Democrats	David Nisbet	196	7.3	−1.3
Majority		549	20.3	−1.3
Turnout		2,701	39.2	−10.7
Conservative hold		Swing	-0.7	

== Monkseaton South ==
North Tyneside Council Elections: Monkseaton South ward 2012
Party	Candidate	Votes	%	±%
Labour	Joan Munby	1,540	50.8	+0.8
Conservative	George Partis	1,375	45.4	+3
Liberal Democrats	John Appleby	114	3.8	−3.7
Majority		165	5.4	−2.2
Turnout		3,029	40.1	−9.2
Labour gain from Conservative		Swing	-1.1	

== Northumberland ==
North Tyneside Council Elections: Northumberland ward 2012
Party	Candidate	Votes	%	±%
Liberal Democrats	Nigel Huscroft	1,165	53.4	−4
Labour	Tony Stephenson	924	42.4	−0.2
Conservative	Barbara Bake	92	4.2	+4.2
Majority		241	11	+0.1
Turnout		2,181	23.4	−14.7
Liberal Democrats hold		Swing	-1.9	

== Preston ==
North Tyneside Council Elections: Preston ward 2012
Party	Candidate	Votes	%	±%
Labour	Cath Davis	1,398	51.7	+6.8
Conservative	Glynis Barrie	1,308	48.3	−2.4
Majority		90	3.3	−2.5
Turnout		2,706	38.9	−8
Labour gain from Conservative		Swing	+4.6	

== Riverside ==
North Tyneside Council Elections: Riverside ward 2012
Party	Candidate	Votes	%	±%
Labour	Frank Lott	1,684	84.6	+13.4
Conservative	Brian Steward	306	15.4	−2.5
Majority		1,378	69.2	+15.2
Turnout		1,990	25.1	−6
Labour hold		Swing	+8	

== St Mary's ==
North Tyneside Council Elections: St Mary's ward 2012
Party	Candidate	Votes	%	±%
Conservative	Judith Wallace	2,536	77.8	+7.8
Labour	Simon Philpott	538	16.5	−3
Liberal Democrats	Michael Day	187	5.7	+0.4
Majority		1,998	61.2	+10.6
Turnout		3,261	47.9	−11.2
Conservative hold		Swing	+5.4	

== Tynemouth ==
North Tyneside Council Elections: Tynemouth ward 2012
Party	Candidate	Votes	%	±%
Conservative	David Lilly	1,611	51.1	+1.2
Labour	Jeffrey Maughan	1,539	48.9	+4.9
Majority		72	2.2	−3.8
Turnout		3,150	37.8	−11
Conservative hold		Swing	-1.9	

== Valley ==
North Tyneside Council Elections: Valley ward 2012
Party	Candidate	Votes	%	±%
Labour	Tommy Mulvenna	1,728	81.6	+5.9
Conservative	Frank Austin	390	18.4	−5.9
Majority		1,338	63.1	+11.5
Turnout		2,118	26.4	−7.6
Labour hold		Swing	+5.9	

== Wallsend ==
North Tyneside Council Elections: Wallsend ward 2012
Party	Candidate	Votes	%	±%
Labour	Gary Madden	1,095	48	−4.4
Liberal Democrats	Michael Huscroft	1,089	47.8	+11.5
Conservative	Philip Wilson	95	4.2	+4.2
Majority		6	0.2	−15.9
Turnout		2,279	29.3	−8.3
Labour gain from Liberal Democrats		Swing	-8	

A further by-election was held in November 2012. Details can be found here.

== Weetslade ==
North Tyneside Council Elections: Weetslade ward 2012
Party	Candidate	Votes	%	±%
Labour	Anthony McMullen	1,901	64	+0.6
Conservative	Duncan McLellan	1,071	36	−0.6
Majority		830	28	+9.1
Turnout		2,972	39.3	−9.5
Labour gain from Conservative		Swing	+0.6	

== Whitley Bay ==
North Tyneside Council Elections: Whitley Bay ward 2012
Party	Candidate	Votes	%	±%
Labour	Sandra Graham	1,442	52.1	+5.3
Conservative	Michael McIntyre	1,326	47.9	+3.3
Majority		116	4.2	+2
Turnout		2,768	38.8	−6.5
Labour gain from Conservative		Swing	+1	

Preceded by 2011 North Tyneside Council election	North Tyneside local elections	Succeeded by 2013 North Tyneside Council mayoral election
