= Kate Osborne =

British Labour politician

Kate Osborne MP
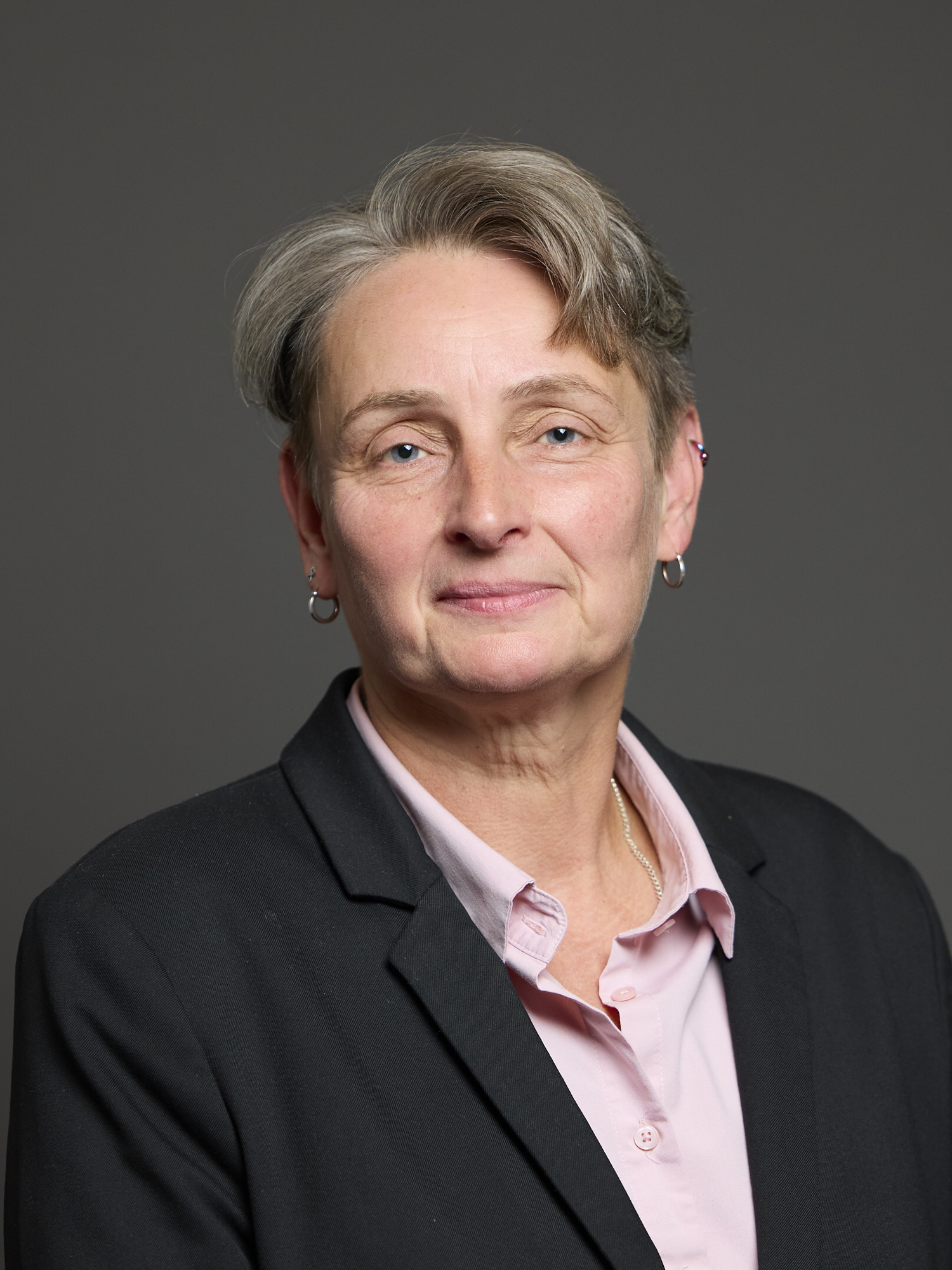
- Official portrait, 2024

Member of Parliament for Jarrow and Gateshead East Jarrow (2019–2024)
- Incumbent
- Assumed office 12 December 2019
- Preceded by: Stephen Hepburn
- Majority: 8,946 (24.4%)

Personal details
- Party: Labour
- Other political affiliations: Socialist Campaign Group (2019–present)
- Children: 2
- Occupation: Politician
- Website: kate-osborne.co.uk

Katharine Helen Osborne is a British Labour Party politician who has been the Member of Parliament (MP) for Jarrow and Gateshead East, formerly Jarrow, since 2019.

== Career ==
Osborne worked for Royal Mail for 25 years. Her first foray into politics came in 2009, when she contested a by-election for Preston ward on North Tyneside Council, losing to Conservative David Sarin. The following year, Osborne was elected to represent the ward at the 2010 local elections, gaining the seat from the Conservative incumbent. She was re-elected to represent Preston in 2014, and again in 2018. Osborne did not stand at the 2022 North Tyneside elections.

She was elected to the House of Commons at the 2019 general election, representing Jarrow, a safe seat for Labour. She succeeded the party's former MP Stephen Hepburn, who had been prevented from standing again over allegations of misconduct. Osborne is a member of Labour's left-wing Socialist Campaign Group.

Osborne was appointed Parliamentary private secretary (PPS) to the Shadow Home Affairs team, led by Shadow Home Secretary Diane Abbott, in January 2020. She served until the front bench reshuffle following Keir Starmer's election as Labour Leader in April 2020. Osborne returned as a PPS in December 2021, this time to the Shadow Northern Ireland team led by Shadow Secretary of State Peter Kyle.

In 2021, she was selected for the Armed Forces Parliamentary Scheme, assigned to the Royal Air Force.

During the June 2022 rail strikes, Osborne joined a picket line with railway workers, reportedly going against orders from her party not to do so. Commenting, she said, "Solidarity to workers on strike today, they have my full support."

In 2022, a constituent from Jarrow was sentenced to an 18 month community order for "harassment without violence" against Osborne, after sending abusive and homophobic tweets.

In December 2023, Osborne came under scrutiny for accusing Conservative MP Kemi Badenoch of likening trans children to "the spread of a disease" during a parliamentary meeting. When asked by Badenoch, Osborne failed to identify when Badenoch said this. Osborne was later accused of making up quotes that didn't exist.

In August 2025, Osborne was investigated by the Independent Parliamentary Standards Authority (Ipsa) for her spending on travel and subsistence costs. However, using taxis for commuting or carrying luggage had been recommended by Parliament's health service in 2023 following an operation to her spine.

Osborne wrote an op-ed in The Independent in May 2026, in which she called for Keir Starmer to resign. "I have lived in Tyneside for 36 years, seven years as an MP and ten years as a Labour councillor in North Tyneside before that. Never have I felt so much anger on the doorstep," she said. "It is no exaggeration to say that Keir Starmer's name came up on the doorstep more than any other Labour leader in the 40-odd years I have been knocking on doors."

== Personal life ==
Originally from Folkestone in Kent, Osborne has lived in Tyneside since 1990. She describes herself as an "out queer woman" and is an activist and campaigner in the trade union and LGBT+ movements.

She was married to Pamela Brooks, a former North Tyneside councillor. The couple served on the council at the same time, including four years in which they both represented Preston ward. Brooks gained Preston from the Conservative candidate who had defeated her partner in 2009. Osborne has two sons and lives in her Jarrow constituency.

On 16 March 2020, Osborne became the second British Member of Parliament to test positive for COVID-19, after Conservative Nadine Dorries. She was in self-isolation in her London flat for three weeks.

Parliament of the United Kingdom
Preceded by Stephen Hepburn	Member of Parliament for Jarrow; 2019–2024	Constituency abolished
New constituency	Member of Parliament for Jarrow and Gateshead East; 2024–present	Incumbent
