= 2011 North Tyneside Metropolitan Borough Council election =

2011 UK local government election

Results of the 2011 North Tyneside Metropolitan Borough Council election

Elections to North Tyneside Metropolitan Council took place on 5 May 2011 on the same day as other council elections in England and the UK AV referendum.

North Tyneside Council is elected "in thirds" which means one councillor from each three-member ward is elected each year with a fourth year when the mayoral election takes place.

One third of the councillors were elected in 2007. The Labour Party gained 6 seats, and lost none. giving them an overall majority of councillors. The Conservative Party remain in control however as the mayor continues to be Linda Arkley. Arkley now has to seek the support of other parties to get her budget passed as the Conservatives lost 5 seats and the 20 seats required to pass such legislature. The Liberal Democrats also lost one seat for the second consecutive year. Labour won 14 seats in 2010 and 2011 combined, with the Conservative losing 12, switching the balance of power in the council chamber.

North Tyneside Council election result 2011
Party	Seats	Gains	Losses	Net gain/loss	Seats %	Votes %	Votes	+/−
Labour	35	6	0	+6	58.3	54.3	35,226	+4.2%
Conservative	19	0	5	-5	31.7	33.6	21,806	+1.1%
Liberal Democrats	6	0	1	-1	10	10.4	6,749	-4.7%
National Front	0	0	0	0	0	0.75	503	+0.18%
Green	0	0	0	0	0	0.54	349	-0.76%
Independent	0	0	0	0	0	0.29	187	+0.29%
BNP	0	0	0	0	0	0.15	96	-1.05%

== Battle Hill ==
North Tyneside Council elections: Battle Hill ward 2011
Party	Candidate	Votes	%	±%
Labour	Lesley Spillard	1,962	63.8	+17
Liberal Democrats	Dorothy Bradley	1,133	36.2	−5.2
Majority		829	27	+21.6
Turnout		3,075	37.7	−23.5
Labour hold		Swing	+11.1	

== Benton ==
North Tyneside Council elections: Benton ward 2011
Party	Candidate	Votes	%	±%
Labour	Janet Hunter	2,060	53.9	+7.3
Conservative	John Goodfellow	1,613	42.2	+7.9
Liberal Democrats	Bob Watson	149	3.9	−15.2
Majority		447	11.7	−0.6
Turnout		3,822	49	−17.7
Labour gain from Conservative		Swing	-0.3	

== Camperdown ==
North Tyneside Council elections: Camperdown ward 2011
Party	Candidate	Votes	%	±%
Labour	Ray Glindon	1,946	76.1	+17.6
Conservative	Ray Taylor	612	23.9	+6.1
Majority		1,334	40.7	+11.6
Turnout		2,558	33	−25.1
Labour hold		Swing	+5.8	

== Chirton ==
North Tyneside Council elections: Chirton ward 2011
Party	Candidate	Votes	%	±%
Labour	David Corkey	1,841	76.1	−1.3
Conservative	Sue Rodgerson	579	23.9	+1.3
Majority		1,260	52.1	−2.6
Turnout		2,420	29.5	−23.8
Labour hold		Swing	-1.3	

== Collingwood ==
North Tyneside Council elections: Collingwood ward 2011
Party	Candidate	Votes	%	±%
Labour	Martin Rankin	2,106	62.2	0
Conservative	Paul Bunyan	1,136	33.5	−4.3
Liberal Democrats	Norma Playle	146	4.3	+4.3
Majority		750	22.1	+2
Turnout		3,388	42.5	−22.8
Labour gain from Conservative		Swing	+2.2	

== Cullercoats ==
North Tyneside Council elections: Cullercoats ward 2011
Party	Candidate	Votes	%	±%
Conservative	George Westwater	1,995	52	+3.8
Labour	Ron Bales	1,838	48	+5.2
Majority		157	4.1	−1.3
Turnout		3,833	51.7	−24.3
Conservative hold		Swing	-0.7	

== Howdon ==
North Tyneside Council elections: Howdon ward 2011
Party	Candidate	Votes	%	±%
Labour	John Harrison	1,884	72	+15.7
Liberal Democrats	Paul Moat	437	16.7	−9
National Front	Roger Batten	295	11.3	+3.4
Majority		1,447	55.3	+24.7
Turnout		2,616	31.2	−25.1
Labour hold		Swing	+12.4	

== Killingworth ==
North Tyneside Council elections: Killingworth ward 2011
Party	Candidate	Votes	%	±%
Labour	Alison Waggot-Fairley	1,872	56.7	+6.9
Conservative	Nigel Clothier	1,259	38.2	+6.2
Liberal Democrats	Thomas Barton	169	5.1	−13.1
Majority		613	18.6	+0.8
Turnout		3,300	41.9	−23.6
Labour gain from Conservative		Swing	+0.4	

== Longbenton ==
North Tyneside Council elections: Longbenton ward 2011
Party	Candidate	Votes	%	±%
Labour	Kevin Conroy	2,029	72	+18
Conservative	Robin Underwood	544	19.6	+3.9
National Front	Mark Nicholls	208	7.5	+3
Majority		1,485	53.4	+19.8
Turnout		2,781	34.7	−22.8
Labour hold		Swing	+7.1	

== Monkseaton North ==
North Tyneside Council elections: Monkseaton North ward 2011
Party	Candidate	Votes	%	±%
Conservative	Paul Mason	1,943	56.5	+9.9
Labour	Glenn Stillaway	1,201	34.9	+1.9
Liberal Democrats	David Nisbet	296	8.6	−11.9
Majority		742	21.6	+8
Turnout		3,440	49.9	−26.6
Conservative hold		Swing	+4	

== Monkseaton South ==
North Tyneside Council elections: Monkseaton South ward 2011
Party	Candidate	Votes	%	±%
Labour	Bill Caithness	1,863	50	+6.6
Conservative	Ken Mewett	1,580	42.4	+2.4
Liberal Democrats	Charles Hall	280	7.5	−8.2
Majority		283	7.6	−1.9
Turnout		3,723	49.3	−32
Labour gain from Conservative		Swing	+2.1	

== Northumberland ==
North Tyneside Council elections: Northumberland ward 2011
Party	Candidate	Votes	%	±%
Liberal Democrats	David Ord	2,035	57.4	+6.7
Labour	Malcolm Redhead	1,509	42.6	+5
Majority		385	10.9	−2.2
Turnout		3,544	38.1	−21.2
Liberal Democrats hold		Swing	+0.9	

== Preston ==
North Tyneside Council elections: Preston ward 2011
Party	Candidate	Votes	%	±%
Conservative	David Sarin	1,654	50.7	+2.4
Labour	Catherine Blyth	1,465	44.9	−6.8
Liberal Democrats	Wil Taylor	153	4.7	+4.7
Majority		189	5.8	+2.5
Turnout		3,263	46.9	−24.5
Conservative hold		Swing	+4.6	

== Riverside ==
North Tyneside Council elections: Riverside ward 2011
Party	Candidate	Votes	%	±%
Labour	Norma Redfearn	1,775	71.2	+16.6
Conservative	Matt Galley	442	17.9	−1.5
Liberal Democrats	Andy Hudson	249	10.1	−15.9
Majority		1,333	54.1	+25.5
Turnout		2,466	31.1	−19.9
Labour hold		Swing	+9.1	

== St Mary's ==
North Tyneside Council elections: St Mary's ward 2011
Party	Candidate	Votes	%	±%
Conservative	Ed Hodson	2,820	70.1	+2.7
Labour	Simon Philpott	784	19.5	−5.6
Liberal Democrats	Michael Day	214	5.3	+5.3
Green	Julia Erskine	206	5.1	−2.4
Majority		2,036	50.6	+8.2
Turnout		4,024	59.1	−19.7
Conservative hold		Swing	+4.2	

== Tynemouth ==
North Tyneside Council elections: Tynemouth ward 2011
Party	Candidate	Votes	%	±%
Conservative	Jean McLaughlin	2,029	49.9	+1.1
Labour	Jeffrey Maughan	1,787	44	−7.2
Liberal Democrats	Clare Barton	248	6.1	+6.1
Majority		242	6	+3.6
Turnout		4,064	48.8	−23.5
Conservative hold		Swing	+4.2	

== Valley ==
North Tyneside Council elections: Valley ward 2011
Party	Candidate	Votes	%	±%
Labour	Carole Gambling	2,064	75.7	+12.5
Conservative	Leon Rodda	661	24.3	−1.7
Majority		1,403	51.5	+14.3
Turnout		2,725	34	−27
Labour hold		Swing	+7.1	

== Wallsend ==
North Tyneside Council elections: Wallsend ward 2011
Party	Candidate	Votes	%	±%
Labour	Jules Rutherford	1,532	52.4	+12.9
Liberal Democrats	Nigel Huscroft	1,061	36.3	−8.7
Independent	Alan Ma	187	6.4	+6.4
Green	Martin Collins	143	4.9	−0.1
Majority		471	16.1	+10.5
Turnout		2,923	37.6	−20
Labour gain from Liberal Democrats		Swing	+10.8	

== Weetslade ==
North Tyneside Council elections: Weetslade ward 2011
Party	Candidate	Votes	%	±%
Labour	Muriel Green	2,196	59.4	+0.8
Conservative	Andrew Elliott	1,498	40.6	−0.8
Majority		698	18.9	+1.6
Turnout		3,694	48.8	−18.5
Labour hold		Swing	+0.8	

== Whitley Bay ==
North Tyneside Council elections: Whitley Bay ward 2011
Party	Candidate	Votes	%	±%
Labour	John O'Shea	1,512	46.8	+7.4
Conservative	Alison Austin	1,441	44.6	+7.7
Liberal Democrats	John Appleby	179	5.5	−14.9
BNP	Dorothy Brooke	96	3	−0.3
Majority		71	2.2	−0.2
Turnout		3,228	45.3	−24.5
Labour gain from Conservative		Swing	-0.2	

Preceded by 2010 North Tyneside Council election	North Tyneside local elections	Succeeded by 2012 North Tyneside Council election
