= 2007 North Tyneside Metropolitan Borough Council election =

Results of the 2007 North Tyneside Metropolitan Borough Council election

Elections to North Tyneside Metropolitan Council took place on 3 May 2007 on the same day as other local council elections in England.

North Tyneside Council is elected "in thirds" which means one councillor from each three-member ward is elected each year for the first three years with a fourth year when the mayoral election takes place.

Against the national trend, the only gain was made by David Corkey of the Labour Party in Chirton Ward, from an Independent candidate, so the council remains in no overall control, but with the Conservative Party having the most councillors overall.

North Tyneside Council Election Result 2007
Party	Seats	Gains	Losses	Net gain/loss	Seats %	Votes %	Votes	+/−
Conservative	28	0	0	0	46.6	40.73	24,107	+0.03%
Labour	23	1	0	+1	38.3	39.85	23,585	+1.35%
Liberal Democrats	9	0	0	0	15	15.48	9,167	+0.22%
BNP	0	0	0	0	0	1.24	734	-0.06%
National Front	0	0	0	0	0	1.03	613	+1.03%
Independent	0	0	1	-1	0	1.02	606	-2.78%
UKIP	0	0	0	0	0	0.31	181	+0.31%
Green	0	0	0	0	0	0.22	132	+0.22%
New Nationalist Party	0	0	0	0	0	0.09	59	+0.09%

== Battle Hill ==
North Tyneside Council Elections: Battle Hill ward 2007
Party	Candidate	Votes	%	±%
Labour	Mary Glindon	1,444	45.95	+3.86
Liberal Democrats	Christopher Croft	1,433	45.6	−0.51
BNP	Gladys Dobinson	265	8.43	−3.36
Majority		11	0.35	−3.67
Turnout		3,142	39.23	+1.94
Labour hold		Swing	+2.19	

== Benton ==
North Tyneside Council Elections: Benton ward 2007
Party	Candidate	Votes	%	±%
Conservative	John Goodfellow	1,813	49.83	−3.13
Labour	Joanne Cassidy	1,480	40.48	+3
Liberal Democrats	Sarah Richards	345	9.48	+0.13
Majority		333	9.15	−0.06
Turnout		3,638	47.3	+2.7
Conservative hold		Swing	-0.07	

== Camperdown ==
North Tyneside Council Elections: Camperdown ward 2007
Party	Candidate	Votes	%	±%
Labour	Raymond Glindon	1,330	54.82	−1.79
Conservative	Norma Peggs	460	18.96	−7.14
Liberal Democrats	Patricia Dawson	328	13.52	+13.52
BNP	Gordon Steel	308	12.69	−4.59
Majority		870	35.86	+5.36
Turnout		2,426	32	+1.06
Labour hold		Swing	+2.68	

== Chirton ==
North Tyneside Council Elections: Chirton ward 2007
Party	Candidate	Votes	%	±%
Labour	David Corkey	1,377	58.1	+3.61
Independent	Sandy Carter	606	25.56	−19.94
Conservative	Margaret Kelly	387	16.32	+16.32
Majority		771	33.18	+24.29
Turnout		2,370	33.45	+2.9
Labour gain from Independent		Swing	+11.7	

== Collingwood ==
North Tyneside Council Elections: Collingwood ward 2007
Party	Candidate	Votes	%	±%
Conservative	Julia Macaulay	1,777	54.39	+8.69
Labour	Margaret Hall	1,490	45.61	+6.11
Majority		287	8.78	+2.58
Turnout		3,267	40.23	−0.08
Conservative hold		Swing	+1.29	

== Cullercoats ==
North Tyneside Council Elections: Cullercoats ward 2007
Party	Candidate	Votes	%	±%
Conservative	Lawrence Goveas MBE	2,577	67.3	−5.36
Labour	Vicki Gilbert	1,252	32.7	+5.36
Majority		1,325	34.6	−10.93
Turnout		3,829	51.36	+0.92
Conservative hold		Swing	-5.36	

== Howdon ==
North Tyneside Council Elections: Howdon ward 2007
Party	Candidate	Votes	%	±%
Labour	David Charlton	1,309	50.77	−1.52
Liberal Democrats	Johnny Croney	898	34.83	−12.87
National Front	Robert Batten	371	14.39	+14.39
Majority		411	34.6	+30
Turnout		2,578	33.7	+1.53
Labour hold		Swing	-18.1	

== Killingworth ==
North Tyneside Council Elections: Killingworth ward 2007
Party	Candidate	Votes	%	±%
Conservative	Nigel Clothier	1,413	49.44	+6.26
Labour	Alison Waggott-Fairly	1,143	39.99	−9
Liberal Democrats	Kenneth McGarrigle	302	10.56	−2.41
Majority		270	9.44	+8.78
Turnout		2,858	38.2	+2.14
Conservative hold		Swing	+7.63	

== Longbenton ==
North Tyneside Council Elections: Longbenton ward 2007
Party	Candidate	Votes	%	±%
Labour	Kevin Conroy	1,492	55.23	+11.39
Liberal Democrats	Ronnie Fletcher	614	22.73	+22.73
Conservative	Robin Underwood	353	13.06	−12.62
National Front	Mark Nicholls	242	8.98	+8.98
Majority		878	32.5	−14.1
Turnout		2,701	37.1	+3.34
Labour hold		Swing	-5.67	

== Monkseaton North ==
North Tyneside Council Elections: Monkseaton North ward 2007
Party	Candidate	Votes	%	±%
Conservative	Bill Prendergast	1,970	64.52	+2.28
Labour	Glen Stillaway	569	18.63	−2.6
Liberal Democrats	Alison Campbell	514	16.83	+0.31
Majority		1,401	45.88	+4.88
Turnout		3,053	44.7	−1.25
Conservative hold		Swing	+2.44	

== Monkseaton South ==
North Tyneside Council Elections: Monkseaton South ward 2007
Party	Candidate	Votes	%	±%
Conservative	Ken Mewett	1,838	53.24	+2.82
Labour	Ian Grayson	1,614	46.76	+20.21
Majority		224	6.48	−16.97
Turnout		3,452	47.4	+2.11
Conservative hold		Swing	-8.7	

== Northumberland ==
North Tyneside Council Elections: Northumberland ward 2007
Party	Candidate	Votes	%	±%
Liberal Democrats	David Ord	1,650	69.91	+5.8
Labour	Gary Madden	546	23.13	−3.02
Conservative	Miriam Smith	164	6.94	−2.83
Majority		1,104	46.77	+7.22
Turnout		2,360	36.77	+1.39
Liberal Democrats hold		Swing	+4.41	

== Preston ==
North Tyneside Council Elections: Preston ward 2007
Party	Candidate	Votes	%	±%
Conservative	Linda Arkley	1,936	64.38	+1.16
Labour	Daniel Jackson	1,071	35.62	−1.22
Majority		865	28.76	+2.46
Turnout		3,007	43.93	+2.22
Conservative hold		Swing	+1.19	

== Riverside ==
North Tyneside Council Elections: Riverside ward 2007
Party	Candidate	Votes	%	±%
Labour	Norma Redfearn	1,262	55.71	+1.68
Liberal Democrats	John Carter	1,003	44.29	+44.29
Majority		259	11.43	+3.37
Turnout		2,265	33.8	+2.5
Labour hold		Swing	-21.3	

== St Mary's ==
North Tyneside Council Elections: St Mary's ward 2007
Party	Candidate	Votes	%	±%
Conservative	Ed Hodson	2,761	73.64	−10.36
Liberal Democrats	Iain Campbell	549	14.64	+14.64
Labour	Michael Green	439	11.72	−4.27
Majority		2,212	59	−9
Turnout		3,749	55	+1.23
Conservative hold		Swing	-12.5	

A further by-election was held on 5 July 2007. Details can be found here.

== Tynemouth ==
North Tyneside Council Elections: Tynemouth ward 2007
Party	Candidate	Votes	%	±%
Conservative	Kenneth Jordan	2,005	64.71	−0.87
Labour	Jane Shaw	1,093	35.29	+0.87
Majority		912	29.43	−1.71
Turnout		3,098	37.75	−5.22
Conservative hold		Swing	-0.87	

== Valley ==
North Tyneside Council Elections: Valley ward 2007
Party	Candidate	Votes	%	±%
Labour	Carole Gambling	1,306	57	−5.92
Conservative	Louise Partis	530	23.13	−13.78
Liberal Democrats	Paul Moat	455	19.86	+19.86
Majority		776	33.87	+7.71
Turnout		2,291	35.72	+3.96
Labour hold		Swing	+3.93	

== Wallsend ==
North Tyneside Council Elections: Wallsend ward 2007
Party	Candidate	Votes	%	±%
Liberal Democrats	Nigel Huscroft	1,459	57.08	−2.96
Labour	Alan Keith	667	26.09	−4.7
BNP	Mark Straker	161	6.29	+6.29
Conservative	Jayne Fleet	140	5.47	−3.67
Green	Martin Collins	132	5.16	+5.16
Majority		792	30.98	+1.74
Turnout		2,556	35.88	+1.41
Liberal Democrats hold		Swing	+0.87	

== Weetslade ==
North Tyneside Council Elections: Weetslade ward 2007
Party	Candidate	Votes	%	±%
Labour	Muriel Green	1,672	46.31	+7.98
Conservative	Judy McLellan	1,423	39.41	−5.28
Liberal Democrats	Raymond Taylor	515	14.26	−3.21
Majority		249	6.98	+1.25
Turnout		3,610	48.33	+2.08
Labour hold		Swing	+6.63	

== Whitley Bay ==
North Tyneside Council Elections: Whitley Bay ward 2007
Party	Candidate	Votes	%	±%
Conservative	Alison Austin	1,662	56.7	+5.8
Labour	Sandra Graham	1,029	35.1	+2.8
UKIP	Allan Pond	181	6.17	+6.17
New Nationalist Party	Christopher Wallis	59	2.01	+2.01
Majority		633	21.59	+2.98
Turnout		2,931	42.03	−0.28
Conservative hold		Swing	+1.5	

Preceded by 2006 North Tyneside Council election	North Tyneside local elections	Succeeded by 2008 North Tyneside Council election
