= 2004 North Tyneside Metropolitan Borough Council election =

2004 UK local government election

Results of the 2004 North Tyneside Metropolitan Borough Council election

Elections to North Tyneside Metropolitan Council took place on 10 June 2004; the same day as other local council elections in England, along with European elections and London mayoral and Assembly elections.

North Tyneside Council is elected "in thirds" which means one councillor from each three-member ward is elected each year for the first three years with a fourth year when the mayoral election takes place.

2004 was the first election after the wards in North Tyneside changed meaning that the whole council was up for election. Holystone, Monkseaton, North Shields and Seatonville were used for the last time in 2003, and replaced by 4 new wards; Killingworth, Monkseaton North, Monkseaton South and Preston.

North Tyneside Council Election Result 2004
Party	Seats	Gains	Losses	Net gain/loss	Seats %	Votes %	Votes	+/−
Conservative	27	6	0	+6	45	40.8	70,156	+3
Labour	26	0	3	-3	43.3	40	68,638	-2.7
Liberal Democrats	7	0	1	-1	11.6	16.5	28,292	-2.4
Independent	0	0	2	-2	0	1.8	3,031	+1.3
BNP	0	0	0	0	0	0.7	1,233	+0.7
National Front	0	0	0	0	0	0.2	332	+0.2

Party political make-up of North Tyneside Council
Party	Seats			Council Composition 10 June 2004
Party	2002	2003	2004	Council Composition 10 June 2004
Conservative	19	21	27	
Labour	33	31	26	
Liberal Democrats	7	7	7	

== Battle Hill ==
North Tyneside Council Elections: Battle Hill ward 2004 (3)
Party	Candidate	Votes	%	±%
Liberal Democrats	June Smith	1,460	15.5	+3.2
Labour	Mary Glindon	1,423	15.1	−3.4
Labour	Raymond Glindon	1,335	14.2	−4.3
Liberal Democrats	Dorothy Bradley	1,310	13.9	+1.7
Liberal Democrats	John Bradley	1,302	13.8	+1.6
Labour	David Tingey-Blackbird	1,260	13.4	−5.1
Conservative	Maureen Chater	351	3.7	+1.1
BNP	Gladys Dobinson	350	3.7	+3.7
Conservative	Edward Smith	335	3.6	+1
Conservative	Hilda Thornton-Bell	299	3.2	+0.6
Turnout		9,425	39.23	+5.43

== Benton ==
North Tyneside Council Elections: Benton ward 2004 (3)
Party	Candidate	Votes	%	±%
Labour	Janet Hunter	1,731	17.7	+0.8
Conservative	John Goodfellow	1,596	16.3	+4
Conservative	Jean Murray	1,534	15.7	+3.4
Labour	Maureen Madden	1,286	13.1	−3.8
Labour	Gary Madden	1,258	12.8	−4.1
Conservative	Athol Marshall	1,245	12.7	+0.4
Liberal Democrats	Mark Finlay	841	8.6	−3.9
BNP	Michael Whitaker	303	3.1	+3.1
Turnout		9,794	42.47	+11.96

== Camperdown ==
North Tyneside Council Elections: Camperdown ward 2004 (3)
Party	Candidate	Votes	%	±%
Labour	James Allan	1,551	22.5	−1.6
Labour	James Conway	1,399	20.3	−3.8
Labour	Jayne Shotton	1,131	16.9	−7.2
Liberal Democrats	Emma Litt-Taylor	610	8.9	−5.5
Independent	Ian Arkle	574	8.3	+8.3
Conservative	Mary Gascoigne	463	6.7	+2.2
Conservative	Kenneth Gascoigne	462	6.7	+2.2
Conservative	Amanda Newton	383	5.6	+1.1
BNP	Gordon Steel	309	4.5	+4.5
Turnout		6,882	30.26	+7.19

== Chirton ==
North Tyneside Council Elections: Chirton ward 2004 (3)
Party	Candidate	Votes	%	±%
Labour	John Stirling	1,388	21.6	−3.4
Labour	Michael Smith	1,352	21	−4
Labour	Sandy Carter	1,305	20.3	−4.7
Conservative	Edward Burnett	642	10	+1.7
Conservative	David Sarin	609	9.5	+2.2
Liberal Democrats	Malcolm Smith	582	9.1	+9.1
Conservative	Philip Gill	550	8.6	+3.1
Turnout		6,428	30.23	+11.53

== Collingwood ==
North Tyneside Council Elections: Collingwood ward 2004 (3)
Party	Candidate	Votes	%	±%
Labour	Stephen Cox	1,673	16.7	−4.7
Conservative	Julia Macaulay	1,625	16.3	+9.8
Conservative	Charles Hobkirk	1,571	15.7	+9.2
Labour	Margaret Hall	1,507	15.1	−6.3
Conservative	Bill Prendergast	1,479	14.8	+8.3
Labour	Ian Grayson	1,429	14.3	−7.1
Liberal Democrats	Eleanor Jellett	712	7.1	−9.2
Turnout		9,996	41.03	+17.82

== Cullercoats ==
North Tyneside Council Elections: Cullercoats ward 2004 (3)
Party	Candidate	Votes	%	±%
Conservative	Shirley Mortimer	2,387	23.7	+4.4
Conservative	Lawrence Goveas MBE	2,360	23.4	+4.1
Conservative	Barbara Stevens	2,172	21.6	+2.1
Labour	Michael Smiles	1,129	11.2	+0.3
Labour	Terence White	1,093	10.1	−0.8
Labour	Shiela Smiles	980	9.7	−1.2
Liberal Democrats	Dennis Wood	947	6.4	−2.8
Turnout		10,068	49.5	+1.7

== Howdon ==
North Tyneside Council Elections: Howdon ward 2004 (3)
Party	Candidate	Votes	%	±%
Labour	John Hunter	1,509	20.3	−0.4
Labour	David Charlton	1,204	16.2	−4.5
Labour	June Allan	1,114	15	−5.7
Liberal Democrats	John Croney	948	12.8	+2.4
Liberal Democrats	Christopher Litt-Taylor	928	12.5	+2.1
Liberal Democrats	Elizabeth Taylor	926	12.5	+2.1
Conservative	Bernard Cowen	292	3.9	+1.7
Conservative	John McGee	267	3.6	+1.4
Conservative	George Partis	247	3.3	+1.1
Turnout		7,435	32.39	+12.39

== Killingworth ==
North Tyneside Council Elections: Killingworth ward 2004 (3)
Party	Candidate	Votes	%	±%
Labour	David McGarr	1,335	17.6	−−−
Conservative	Nigel Clothier	1,204	15.9	−−−
Labour	Linda Darke	1,175	15.5	−−−
Conservative	David Hatfield	1,154	15.3	−−−
Labour	Thomas Mulvenna	1,057	14	−−−
Conservative	Susan Rogerson	997	13.2	−−−
Liberal Democrats	Steven Conoboy	644	8.5	−−−
Turnout		7,566	34.21	−−−

== Longbenton ==
North Tyneside Council Elections: Longbenton ward 2004 (3)
Party	Candidate	Votes	%	±%
Labour	Edward Darke	1,650	23.9	+0.4
Labour	Kevin Conroy	1,318	19.1	−4.4
Labour	Joan Walker	1,158	16.7	−6.8
Independent	Terry Harding	693	10	+10
Independent	Ronald Fletcher	655	9.5	+10
Liberal Democrats	Patricia Dawson	536	7.7	−8.1
Conservative	Robin Underwood	485	7	+0.25
Conservative	Judith McLellan	422	6.1	−0.65
Turnout		6,917	31.66	+12.16

== Monkseaton North ==
North Tyneside Council Elections: Monkseaton North ward 2004 (3)
Party	Candidate	Votes	%	±%
Conservative	Joan Bell	2,117	22.8	−−−
Conservative	Karen Johnston	2,102	22.6	−−−
Conservative	William Jackson	1,985	21.4	−−−
Labour	Alistair Denness	855	9.2	−−−
Labour	Maurice Johnston	788	8.5	−−−
Liberal Democrats	Robert Pinkney	767	8.3	−−−
Labour	Deborah Cox	671	7.2	−−−
Turnout		9,285	45.38	−−−

== Monkseaton South ==
North Tyneside Council Elections: Monkseaton South ward 2004 (3)
Party	Candidate	Votes	%	±%
Conservative	James Richardson	1,920	20.2	−−−
Conservative	Ken Mewett	1,918	20.2	−−−
Conservative	Arthur Martin	1,905	20.1	−−−
Labour	Glen Stillaway	999	10.5	−−−
Liberal Democrats	Dr Joan Harvey	980	10.3	−−−
Labour	John Scott	912	9.6	−−−
Labour	Ruth Hill	852	9	−−−
Turnout		9,486	43.44	−−−

== Northumberland ==
North Tyneside Council Elections: Northumberland ward 2004 (3)
Party	Candidate	Votes	%	±%
Liberal Democrats	Graeme Brett	1,800	23.9	+1.7
Liberal Democrats	David Ord	1,780	23.6	+1.4
Liberal Democrats	Marian Huscroft	1,771	23.5	+1.3
Labour	Joanne Cassidy	571	7.6	−1.7
Labour	David Kane	524	7	−2.3
Labour	Carol Harrison	511	6.8	−2.5
Conservative	Brian McArdle	214	2.8	+0.9
Conservative	Miriam Smith	188	2.5	+0.6
Conservative	Robert Phillifent	181	2.4	+0.5
Turnout		7,540	39.16	+0.59

== Preston ==
North Tyneside Council Elections: Preston ward 2004 (3)
Party	Candidate	Votes	%	±%
Conservative	Glynis Barrie	1,769	20.3	−−−
Conservative	Martin Van Der Merwe	1,750	20.1	−−−
Conservative	Robert Goveas	1,661	19.1	−−−
Labour	Philip Okeefe	998	11.4	−−−
Labour	Wendy Lott	997	11.4	−−−
Labour	Alison Browne	870	10	−−−
Liberal Democrats	Stuart Smith	667	7.7	−−−
Turnout		8,712	42.57	−−−

A further by-election was held on 6 October 2005. Details of this can be found here.

== Riverside ==
North Tyneside Council Elections: Riverside ward 2004 (3)
Party	Candidate	Votes	%	±%
Labour	Francis Lott	1,217	20.1	−2.6
Labour	Norma Redfearn	1,064	18	−4.7
Labour	Charles Pickard	1,038	17.6	−5.1
Independent	John Carter	769	13	+13
Liberal Democrats	James Smith	635	10.8	+6.1
Conservative	David Pygall	461	7.8	+0.35
Conservative	Dennis Smith	382	6.5	−1.05
Independent	John Webb	340	5.8	+5.8
Turnout		5,905	29.45	+7.35

== St Mary's ==
North Tyneside Council Elections: St Mary's ward 2004 (3)
Party	Candidate	Votes	%	±%
Conservative	Marguerite Hall	2,862	25.5	+1.1
Conservative	Ed Hodson	2,852	25.4	+1
Conservative	Pamela McIntyre	2,817	25.1	+0.7
Liberal Democrats	Alison Campbell	792	7.1	−5.8
Labour	Patricia Crowe	706	6.3	+1.7
Labour	Steven Peart	680	6.1	+1.5
Labour	Jill Green	515	4.6	0
Turnout		11,224	54.27	+8.77

== Tynemouth ==
North Tyneside Council Elections: Tynemouth ward 2004 (3)
Party	Candidate	Votes	%	±%
Conservative	Diane Page	2,173	20.6	+3.8
Conservative	Kenneth Jordan	2,167	20.5	−3.9
Conservative	Ian Macaulay	2,150	20.4	−4
Labour	Rowland Hill	1,093	10.3	+1.4
Labour	Arthur Lowe	1,080	10.2	+1.3
Labour	Vicki Gilbert-Jackson	1,029	9.7	+0.8
Liberal Democrats	Iain Campbell	870	8.2	+8.2
Turnout		10,562	42.91	+12.11

== Valley ==
North Tyneside Council Elections: Valley ward 2004 (3)
Party	Candidate	Votes	%	±%
Labour	Angela Potter	1,437	23.8	+5
Labour	Carol Gambling	1,429	23.7	+4.9
Labour	Brian Burdis	1,277	21.1	+2.3
Conservative	Frank Austin	594	9.8	+1.1
Conservative	John Lawson	522	8.6	−0.1
Conservative	Valerie Lawson	512	8.5	−0.2
BNP	Damian Whitaker	271	4.5	+4.5
Turnout		6,042	31.4	+1.4

== Wallsend ==
North Tyneside Council Elections: Wallsend ward 2004 (3)
Party	Candidate	Votes	%	±%
Liberal Democrats	Michael Huscroft	1,813	22.3	+3.1
Liberal Democrats	Nigel Huscroft	1,603	19.7	+0.5
Liberal Democrats	Margaret Finlay	1,405	17.3	−2.1
Labour	Alan Keith	940	11.5	−0.7
Labour	Robert Watson	766	9.4	−2.8
Labour	Michael Green	699	8.6	−3.6
National Front	Robert Nigel Batten	332	4.1	+4.1
Conservative	Jayne Fleet	217	2.7	+0.7
Conservative	Margaret Smith	197	2.4	+0.4
Conservative	Stefan Ochalek	169	2.1	+0.1
Turnout		8,141	42.31	+15.91

== Weetslade ==
North Tyneside Council Elections: Weetslade ward 2004 (3)
Party	Candidate	Votes	%	±%
Labour	John Harrison	1,698	16.7	+1.6
Labour	Muriel Green	1,659	16.3	+1.2
Conservative	Charles Francis	1,630	16	+2.5
Conservative	Duncan McLellan	1,556	15.3	+1.8
Labour	Julie Rutherford	1,437	14.1	−1
Conservative	Robert Newton	1,254	12.3	−1.2
Liberal Democrats	Raymond Taylor	937	9.2	−4.8
Turnout		10,171	45.22	+7.12

A further by-election was held on 23 June 2005. Details of this can be found here.

== Whitley Bay ==
North Tyneside Council Elections: Whitley Bay ward 2004 (3)
Party	Candidate	Votes	%	±%
Conservative	Michael McIntyre	1,637	18.4	−2.2
Conservative	Alison Austin	1,615	18.1	−2.5
Conservative	Margaret Marshall	1,548	17.4	−3.2
Labour	Sandra Graham	1,145	12.9	+0.3
Labour	Sarah Tovell	1,137	12.8	+0.2
Labour	Keith Smiles	1,101	12.4	−0.2
Liberal Democrats	Claire Hindmarsh	726	8.1	+8.1
Turnout		8,909	42.59	+9.69

Preceded by North Tyneside Council and mayoral elections 2003	North Tyneside local elections	Succeeded by 2005 North Tyneside Council mayoral election
