= 1999 North Tyneside Metropolitan Borough Council election =

The 1999 North Tyneside Metropolitan Borough Council election to the North Tyneside Metropolitan Borough Council were held in 1999 alongside other local elections. Labour held control of the council after the election.

== Results summary ==
1999 North Tyneside Metropolitan Borough Council election
Party	This election			Full council			This election		
Party	Seats	Net	Seats %	Other	Total	Total %	Votes	Votes %	+/−
Labour	14	▼5	66.7	23	37	64.9			
Conservative	5	▲4	23.8	6	11	19.3			
Liberal Democrats	2	▲1	9.5	6	8	14.0			
Independent	0	Steady	0.0	1	1	1.8			

== Ward results ==
=== Battle Hill ===
Battle Hill (1 seat)
Party	Candidate	Votes	%	±%
Labour	M. Mulgrove*	1,632	57.0	
Liberal Democrats	E. Buckton	1,229	43.0	
Majority		403	14.1	
Total valid votes		2,861	32.2	
Turnout			32.8	
Registered electors		8,880		
Labour hold		Swing		

=== Benton ===
Benton (2 seats)
Party	Candidate	Votes	%	±%
Labour	J. Hunter*	1,337		
Labour	M. Madden	1,095		
Conservative	R. Whiteman	583		
Conservative	P. McIntyre	497		
Independent	T. Harding	449		
Turnout			32.0	
Registered electors		6,738		
Labour hold		Swing		
Labour hold		Swing		

=== Camperdown ===
Camperdown (1 seat)
Party	Candidate	Votes	%	±%
Labour	R. Schofield*	1,290	79.1	
Liberal Democrats	K. McGarrigle	340	20.9	
Majority		950	58.3	
Total valid votes		1,630	22.8	
Turnout			22.9	
Registered electors		7,157		
Labour hold		Swing		

=== Chirton ===
Chirton (1 seat)
Party	Candidate	Votes	%	±%
Labour	J. Stirling	1,015	72.2	
Conservative	T. Morgan	209	14.9	
Liberal Democrats	I. Campbell	182	12.9	
Majority		806	57.3	
Total valid votes		1,406	24.9	
Turnout			24.9	
Registered electors		5,656		
Labour hold		Swing		

=== Collingwood ===
Collingwood (1 seat)
Party	Candidate	Votes	%	±%
Labour	S. Cox	1,318	69.3	
Conservative	J. Scott	293	15.4	
Liberal Democrats	J. Donnelly	290	15.3	
Majority		1,025	53.9	
Total valid votes		1,901	27.7	
Turnout			27.7	
Registered electors		68,72		
Labour hold		Swing		

=== Cullercoats ===
Cullercoats (1 seat)
Party	Candidate	Votes	%	±%
Conservative	Shirley Mortimer	1,864	50.3	
Labour	Keith Smiles	1,619	43.7	
Liberal Democrats	I. Hall	226	6.1	
Majority		245	6.6	
Total valid votes		3,709	47.6	
Turnout			47.6	
Registered electors		7,799		
Conservative gain from Labour		Swing		

=== Holystone ===
Holystone (1 seat)
Party	Candidate	Votes	%	±%
Labour	D. McGarr*	1,389	68.7	
Conservative	A. Halford	332	16.4	
Liberal Democrats	J. Smith	300	14.8	
Majority		1,057	52.3	
Total valid votes		2,021	21.1	
Turnout			21.2	
Registered electors		9,568		
Labour hold		Swing		

=== Howdon ===
Howdon (1 seat)
Party	Candidate	Votes	%	±%
Labour	E. Dalziel*	995	67.0	
Liberal Democrats	S. Farrell	489	33.0	
Majority		506	34.1	
Total valid votes		1,484	26.2	
Turnout			26.3	
Registered electors		5,659		
Labour hold		Swing		

=== Longbenton ===
Longbenton (1 seat)
Party	Candidate	Votes	%	±%
Labour	E. Darke*	1,045	73.6	
Liberal Democrats	D. Hindmarsh	375	26.4	
Majority		670	47.2	
Total valid votes		1,420	29.6	
Turnout			29.7	
Registered electors		4,801		
Labour hold		Swing		

=== Monkseaton ===
Monkseaton (1 seat)
Party	Candidate	Votes	%	±%
Conservative	Karen Johnston	1,804	50.5	
Labour	Ian Grayson*	1,575	44.1	
Liberal Democrats	D. Wood	195	5.0	
Majority		229	6.4	
Total valid votes		3,574	43.9	
Turnout			45.2	
Registered electors		8,139		
Conservative gain from Labour		Swing		

=== North Shields ===
North Shields (1 seat)
Party	Candidate	Votes	%	±%
Labour	J. Carter*	1,272	46.1	
Conservative	G. Fraser	1,209	43.8	
Liberal Democrats	F. Rosner	281	10.2	
Majority		63	2.3	
Total valid votes		2,762	32.7	
Turnout			32.8	
Registered electors		8,445		
Labour hold		Swing		

=== Northumberland ===
Northumberland (1 seat)
Party	Candidate	Votes	%	±%
Liberal Democrats	G. Brett	1,511	50.7	
Labour	J. Skivington*	1,380	46.3	
Conservative	M. Smith	90	3.0	
Majority		131	4.4	
Total valid votes		2,981	32.4	
Turnout			32.5	
Registered electors		9,188		
Liberal Democrats gain from Labour		Swing		

=== Riverside ===
Riverside (1 seat)
Party	Candidate	Votes	%	±%
Labour	C. Pickard*	962	74.5	
Liberal Democrats	S. McKay	191	14.8	
Conservative	A. Auston	139	10.8	
Majority		771	59.7	
Total valid votes		1,292	20.1	
Turnout			20.0	
Registered electors		6,417		
Labour hold		Swing		

=== Seatonville ===
Seatonville (1 seat)
Party	Candidate	Votes	%	±%
Labour	J. Snowdon	1,046	35.2	
Conservative	L. Hall	989	33.3	
Liberal Democrats	E. Jellet	934	31.5	
Majority		57	1.9	
Total valid votes		2,969	40.5	
Turnout			40.5	
Registered electors		7,335		
Labour hold		Swing		

=== St. Mary's ===
St. Mary's (1 seat)
Party	Candidate	Votes	%	±%
Conservative	M. Hall	2,076	67.7	
Labour	M. Cross	698	22.8	
Liberal Democrats	C. Rosner	294	9.6	
Majority		1,378	44.9	
Total valid votes		3,068	41.3	
Turnout			41.3	
Registered electors		7,437		
Conservative hold		Swing		

=== Tynemouth ===
Tynemouth (1 seat)
Party	Candidate	Votes	%	±%
Conservative	D. Page	1,592	55.9	
Labour	P. Davison	991	34.8	
Liberal Democrats	A. Campbell	263	9.2	
Majority		601	21.1	
Total valid votes		2,846	39.7	
Turnout			39.8	
Registered electors		7,161		
Conservative gain from Labour		Swing		

=== Valley ===
Valley (1 seat)
Party	Candidate	Votes	%	±%
Labour	J. Allan*	1,229	69.9	
Conservative	K. Mayfield	278	15.8	
Liberal Democrats	M. Rudling	250	14.2	
Majority		951	54.1	
Total valid votes		1,757	25.4	
Turnout			25.5	
Registered electors		6,918		
Labour hold		Swing		

=== Wallsend ===
Wallsend (1 seat)
Party	Candidate	Votes	%	±%
Liberal Democrats	N. Huscroft*	1,459	63.4	
Labour	A. Keith	801	34.8	
Conservative	E. Smith	42	1.8	
Majority		658	28.6	
Total valid votes		2,302	33.8	
Turnout			33.9	
Registered electors		8,022		
Liberal Democrats hold		Swing		

=== Weetslade ===
Weetslade (1 seat)
Party	Candidate	Votes	%	±%
Labour	M. Green*	1,362	62.6	
Conservative	A. Aplleton	815	37.4	
Majority		547	25.1	
Total valid votes		2,177	27.1	
Turnout			27.2	
Registered electors		8,022		
Labour hold		Swing		

=== Whitley Bay ===
Battle Hill (1 seat)
Party	Candidate	Votes	%	±%
Conservative	D. Smith	1,507	57.8	
Labour	B. Burdis	847	32.5	
Liberal Democrats	D. Penn	253	9.7	
Majority		660	25.3	
Total valid votes		2,607	37.2	
Turnout			37.3	
Registered electors		7,016		
Conservative gain from Labour		Swing		
