= 1996 North Tyneside Metropolitan Borough Council election =

The 1996 North Tyneside Metropolitan Borough Council election to the North Tyneside Metropolitan Borough Council was held on 2 May 1996 alongside other local elections. Labour held control of the council after the elections, gaining seats from the Conservatives, matching the national trend.

== Results summary ==
1996 North Tyneside Metropolitan Borough Council election
Party	This election			Full council			This election		
Party	Seats	Net	Seats %	Other	Total	Total %	Votes	Votes %	+/−
Labour	15	▲3	71.4	30	45	75.0	29,610	56.4	
Conservative	3	▼4	14.3	5	8	13.3	13,297	25.3	
Liberal Democrats	2	Steady	9.5	4	6	10.0	7,209	13.7	
Independent	1	▲1	4.8	0	1	1.7	1,799	3.4	
Militant Labour	0	Steady	0.0	0	0	0.0	363	0.7	
Green	0	Steady	0.0	0	0	0.0	193	0.4	

== Ward results ==
=== Battle Hill ===
Battle Hill (1 seat)
Party	Candidate	Votes	%	±%
Liberal Democrats	D. Monaghan*	1,709	52.6	
Labour	B. Kane	1,538	47.4	
Majority		171	5.3	
Total valid votes		3,247	35.3	
Registered electors		9,186		
Liberal Democrats hold		Swing		

=== Benton ===
Benton (1 seat)
Party	Candidate	Votes	%	±%
Labour	J. Seagroatt*	1,601	75.6	
Conservative	D. Watson	516	24.4	
Majority		1,085	51.3	
Total valid votes		2,117	31.2	
Registered electors		6,790		
Labour hold		Swing		

=== Camperdown ===
Camperdown (1 seat)
Party	Candidate	Votes	%	±%
Labour	J. Conway*	1,470	78.2	
Liberal Democrats	A. Dudley	279	14.8	
Conservative	A. Austin	131	7.0	
Majority		1,191	63.4	
Total valid votes		1,880	26.4	
Registered electors		7,124		
Labour hold		Swing		

=== Chirton ===
Chirton (1 seat)
Party	Candidate	Votes	%	±%
Labour	M. Nolan*	1,225	77.5	
Conservative	T. Morgan	178	11.3	
Liberal Democrats	M. Rudling	177	11.2	
Majority		1,047	66.3	
Total valid votes		1,580	26.2	
Registered electors		6,036		
Labour hold		Swing		

=== Collingwood ===
Collingwood (1 seat)
Party	Candidate	Votes	%	±%
Labour	P. O'Keefe*	1,707	83.0	
Conservative	H. Perks	350	17.0	
Majority		1,357	66.0	
Total valid votes		2,057	27.4	
Registered electors		7,500		
Labour hold		Swing		

=== Cullercoats ===
Cullercoats (1 seat)
Party	Candidate	Votes	%	±%
Labour	D. Cox	2,021	50.8	
Conservative	Keith Smiles	1,955	49.2	
Majority		66	1.7	
Total valid votes		3,976	50.9	
Registered electors		7,818		
Labour gain from Conservative		Swing		

=== Holystone ===
Holystone (1 seat)
Party	Candidate	Votes	%	±%
Labour	R. Lackenby*	1,973	84.2	
Conservative	F. Austin	370	15.8	
Majority		1,603	68.4	
Total valid votes		2,343	24.8	
Registered electors		9,462		
Labour hold		Swing		

=== Howdon ===
Howdon (1 seat)
Party	Candidate	Votes	%	±%
Labour	T. Cruikshanks*	1,269	76.1	
Liberal Democrats	E. Monaghan	215	12.9	
Militant Labour	R. Taylor	184	11.0	
Majority		1,054	63.2	
Total valid votes		1,668	26.5	
Registered electors		5,659		
Labour hold		Swing		

=== Longbenton ===
Longbenton (1 seat)
Party	Candidate	Votes	%	±%
Independent	R. Fletcher	1,230	54.2	
Labour	B. Flood*	712	31.4	
Liberal Democrats	K. McGarrigle	248	10.9	
Conservative	K. Tatam	78	3.4	
Majority		518	22.8	
Total valid votes		2,268	37.8	
Registered electors		5,993		
Independent gain from Labour		Swing		

=== Monkseaton ===
Monkseaton (1 seat)
Party	Candidate	Votes	%	±%
Labour	D. Nugent	1,697	49.1	
Conservative	Margaret Howe*	1,565	45.3	
Green	D. Clarkson	193	5.6	
Majority		143	3.8	
Total valid votes		3,455	43.5	
Labour gain from Conservative		Swing		

=== North Shields ===
North Shields (1 seat)
Party	Candidate	Votes	%	±%
Labour	H. Bruce	1,542	54.8	
Conservative	S. Mortimer	1,019	36.2	
Liberal Democrats	F. Goodfellow	251	8.9	
Majority		523	18.6	
Total valid votes		2,812	35.1	
Registered electors		8,019		
Labour gain from Conservative		Swing		

=== Northumberland ===
Northumberland (1 seat)
Party	Candidate	Votes	%	±%
Labour	R. Usher*	1,477	60.1	
Liberal Democrats	D. Ord	980	39.9	
Majority		497	20.2	
Total valid votes		2,457	27.1	
Registered electors		9,068		
Labour hold		Swing		

=== Riverside ===
Riverside (1 seat)
Party	Candidate	Votes	%	±%
Labour	R. Stringfellow*	1,261	79.4	
Militant Labour	A. Costello	179	11.3	
Conservative	M. Beryy	148	9.3	
Majority		1,082	68.1	
Total valid votes		1,588	23.0	
Registered electors		6,896		
Labour hold		Swing		

=== Seatonville ===
Seatonville (1 seat)
Party	Candidate	Votes	%	±%
Labour	J. Smith	1,154	39.5	
Liberal Democrats	D. Thomas	910	31.1	
Conservative	P. Wilkinson	859	29.4	
Majority		244	8.3	
Total valid votes		2,923	39.8	
Registered electors		7,353		
Labour gain from Conservative		Swing		

=== St. Mary's ===
St. Mary's (1 seat)
Party	Candidate	Votes	%	±%
Conservative	C. Morgan	2,091	62.0	
Labour	M. Cross	936	27.8	
Liberal Democrats	F. Rosner	343	10.2	
Majority		1,155	34.3	
Total valid votes		3,370	44.1	
Registered electors		7,635		
Conservative hold		Swing		

=== Tynemouth ===
Tynemouth (1 seat)
Party	Candidate	Votes	%	±%
Conservative	L. Arkely	1,736	51.6	
Labour	B. Burdis	1,404	41.7	
Liberal Democrats	A. McManus	223	6.6	
Majority		332	9.9	
Total valid votes		3,363	47.1	
Registered electors		7,134		
Conservative hold		Swing		

=== Valley ===
Valley (2 seats)
Party	Candidate	Votes	%	±%
Labour	A. Long	1,438	63.7	
Labour	C. Gambling*	1,315		
Independent	J. Dodd	569	25.2	
Conservative	H. Pope	252	11.2	
Majority		869	38.5	
Total valid votes		3,574		
Registered electors		7,151		
Labour hold		Swing		
Labour hold		Swing		

=== Wallsend ===
Wallsend (1 seat)
Party	Candidate	Votes	%	±%
Liberal Democrats	M. Huscroft*	1,686	67.6	
Labour	M. Warne	809	32.4	
Majority		877	35.2	
Total valid votes		2,495	36.7	
Registered electors		6,792		
Liberal Democrats hold		Swing		

=== Weetslade ===
Weetslade (1 seat)
Party	Candidate	Votes	%	±%
Labour	J. Harrison*	1,555	76.2	
Conservative	A. Tatam	487	23.8	
Majority		1,068	52.3	
Total valid votes		2,042	25.4	
Registered electors		8,031		
Labour hold		Swing		

=== Whitley Bay ===
Whitley Bay (1 seat)
Party	Candidate	Votes	%	±%
Conservative	M. McIntyre*	1,562	48.0	
Labour	M. Hall	1,506	46.3	
Liberal Democrats	D. Penn	188	5.8	
Majority		56	1.7	
Total valid votes		3,256	46.2	
Registered electors		7,042		
Conservative hold		Swing		
