= 2008 North Tyneside Metropolitan Borough Council election =

2008 UK local government election

Results of the 2008 North Tyneside Metropolitan Borough Council election

Elections to North Tyneside Metropolitan Council took place on 1 May 2008 on the same day as other local council elections in England.

North Tyneside Council is elected "in thirds" which means one councillor from each three-member ward is elected each year with a fourth year when the mayoral election takes place.

One-third of the councillors were elected in 2008. The Conservative Party gained an overall majority of one on the council after the election which previously had been under no overall control. However the directly elected mayor, John Harrison, belongs to the Labour Party, meaning Labour remained in effective control of the council, as he can only be overruled by a two-thirds majority of the council.

North Tyneside Council election result 2008
Party	Seats	Gains	Losses	Net gain/loss	Seats %	Votes %	Votes	+/−
Conservative	31	3	0	+3	51.7	44.2	26,224	+3.5
Labour	21	1	3	-2	35.0	37.5	22,198	-2.4
Liberal Democrats	8	0	1	-1	13.3	15.6	9,254	+0.1
BNP	0	0	0	0	0.0	2.1	1,218	+0.9
National Front	0	0	0	0	0.0	0.42	242	-0.61
Green	0	0	0	0	0.0	0.23	132	+0.01

Party political make-up of North Tyneside Council
Party	Seats			Council composition 1 May 2008
Party	2006	2007	2008	Council composition 1 May 2008
Conservative	28	28	31	
Labour	23	23	21	
Liberal Democrats	8	9	8	

== Battle Hill ==
North Tyneside Council Elections: Battle Hill ward 2008
Party	Candidate	Votes	%	±%
Liberal Democrats	Christopher Croft	1,612	53.1	+7.5
Labour	David Tingey-Blackbird	1,110	36.5	−13.5
BNP	Jeffrey Rutherford	316	10.4	+2
Majority		502	16.5	+16.1
Turnout		3,038	37.9	−1.3
Liberal Democrats hold		Swing	+10.5	

== Benton ==
North Tyneside Council Elections: Benton ward 2008
Party	Candidate	Votes	%	±%
Conservative	Leslie Birkinfield	1,802	50.1	+0.3
Labour	Joanne Cassidy	1,454	40.4	−0.1
Liberal Democrats	Sarah Richards	344	9.5	0
Majority		348	9.7	+0.5
Turnout		3,600	46.8	−0.8
Conservative gain from Labour		Swing	+0.2	

== Camperdown ==
North Tyneside Council Elections: Camperdown ward 2008
Party	Candidate	Votes	%	±%
Labour	Jim Allan	1,312	53.2	−1.6
Conservative	Martyn Peggs	562	22.8	+3.8
BNP	Gordon Steel	363	14.7	+2
Liberal Democrats	Norma Playle	231	9.4	−4.1
Majority		750	30.4	−5.3
Turnout		2,468	32.6	+0.6
Labour hold		Swing	-2.7	

== Chirton ==
North Tyneside Council Elections: Chirton ward 2008
Party	Candidate	Votes	%	±%
Labour	John Stirling	1,181	54.4	−3.7
Conservative	David Milton	652	30	+13.7
Liberal Democrats	Thomas Barton	337	15.5	+15.5
Majority		529	24.4	−8.8
Turnout		2,170	30.6	−2.9
Labour hold		Swing	-8.7	

== Collingwood ==
North Tyneside Council Elections: Collingwood ward 2008
Party	Candidate	Votes	%	±%
Conservative	Barbara Stevens	1,859	57.4	+3
Labour	Steven Cox	1,379	42.6	−3
Majority		480	14.8	+6
Turnout		3,238	39.8	−0.4
Conservative gain from Labour		Swing	+3	

== Cullercoats ==
North Tyneside Council Elections: Cullercoats ward 2008
Party	Candidate	Votes	%	±%
Conservative	Shirley Mortimer	2,744	73.6	+6.3
Labour	Vicki Gilbert	985	26.4	−6.3
Majority		1,759	47.2	+12.6
Turnout		3,729	50	−1.4
Conservative hold		Swing	+6.3	

== Howdon ==
North Tyneside Council Elections: Howdon ward 2008
Party	Candidate	Votes	%	±%
Labour	John Hunter	1,304	54.2	+3.4
Liberal Democrats	Paul Moat	1,100	45.8	+11
Majority		204	8.5	−26.1
Turnout		2,404	31.4	−2.3
Labour hold		Swing	-3.8	

== Killingworth ==
North Tyneside Council Elections: Killingworth ward 2008
Party	Candidate	Votes	%	±%
Conservative	Norma Peggs	1,398	48.4	−1
Labour	Dave McGarr	1,166	40.3	+0.3
Liberal Democrats	John Appleby	327	11.3	+0.7
Majority		232	8	−1.4
Turnout		2,891	38.6	+0.4
Conservative gain from Labour		Swing	-0.65	

== Longbenton ==
North Tyneside Council Elections: Longbenton ward 2008
Party	Candidate	Votes	%	±%
Labour	Eddie Darke	1,725	64.5	+9.3
Conservative	Joseph Prince	644	24.1	+11
National Front	Mark Nicholls	305	11.4	+2.4
Majority		1,081	40.4	+7.9
Turnout		2,674	36.7	−0.4
Labour hold		Swing	-0.85	

== Monkseaton North ==
North Tyneside Council Elections: Monkseaton North ward 2008
Party	Candidate	Votes	%	±%
Conservative	Joan Bell	2,088	67.8	+3.3
Labour	Glenn Stillaway	596	19.3	+0.7
Liberal Democrats	Eleanor Jellett	397	12.9	−3.9
Majority		1,492	48.4	+2.5
Turnout		3,081	45.1	+0.4
Conservative hold		Swing	+1.3	

A further by-election was held in June 2008. Details can be found here.

== Monkseaton South ==
North Tyneside Council Elections: Monkseaton South ward 2008
Party	Candidate	Votes	%	±%
Conservative	George Partis	1,874	52.2	−1
Labour	Ian Grayson	1,419	39.6	−7.2
Liberal Democrats	Clare Hindmarsh	294	8.2	+8.2
Majority		455	12.7	+6.2
Turnout		3,587	49.3	+1.9
Conservative hold		Swing	+3.1	

== Northumberland ==
North Tyneside Council Elections: Northumberland ward 2008
Party	Candidate	Votes	%	±%
Liberal Democrats	Graeme Brett	1,639	66	−3.9
Labour	Ernie Nolan	601	24.2	+1.1
Conservative	Miriam Smith	244	9.8	+2.9
Majority		1,038	41.8	−5
Turnout		2,484	38.7	+1.9
Liberal Democrats hold		Swing	-2.5	

== Preston ==
North Tyneside Council Elections: Preston ward 2008
Party	Candidate	Votes	%	±%
Conservative	Glynis Barrie	2,111	70	+5.6
Labour	Jonathan Narcross	903	30	−5.6
Majority		1,208	40.1	+11.3
Turnout		3,014	44	+0.1
Conservative hold		Swing	+5.6	

A further by-election was held on 24 September 2009. Details can be found here.

== Riverside ==
North Tyneside Council Elections: Riverside ward 2008
Party	Candidate	Votes	%	±%
Labour	Frank Lott	1,199	52.9	−2.8
Liberal Democrats	Raymond Taylor	526	23.2	−21.1
Conservative	David Pygall	369	16.3	+16.3
Green	Martin Collins	172	7.6	+7.6
Majority		673	29.7	+18.3
Turnout		2,266	33.8	0
Labour hold		Swing	+9.15	

== St Mary's ==
North Tyneside Council Elections: St Mary's ward 2008
Party	Candidate	Votes	%	±%
Conservative	Judith Wallace	3,156	83.4	+6.6
Labour	Patricia Crowe	627	16.6	+2.6
Majority		2,529	66.9	+4.1
Turnout		3,783	54.8	+17.2
Conservative hold		Swing	+2	

== Tynemouth ==
North Tyneside Council Elections: Tynemouth ward 2008
Party	Candidate	Votes	%	±%
Conservative	Diane Page	2,365	67.6	+2.9
Labour	Jane Shaw	1,131	32.4	−2.9
Majority		1,234	35.3	+5.9
Turnout		3,496	42.7	+4.9
Conservative hold		Swing	+2.9	

A further by-election was held on 5 February 2009. Details can be found here.

== Valley ==
North Tyneside Council Elections: Valley ward 2008
Party	Candidate	Votes	%	±%
Labour	Tommy Mulvenna	1,106	44.5	−12.5
Conservative	Leslie Miller	621	25	+1.9
Liberal Democrats	Angela Potter	478	19.2	−0.7
BNP	John Burrows	282	11.3	N/A
Majority		485	19.5	−14.4
Turnout		2,487	38.8	+3.1

The sitting councillor, Angela Potter, had previously defected to the Liberal Democrats from the Labour Party.

== Wallsend ==
North Tyneside Council Elections: Wallsend ward 2008
Party	Candidate	Votes	%	±%
Liberal Democrats	Michael Huscroft	1,561	60.9	+3.8
Labour	Gary Madden	543	21.2	−4.9
BNP	Paul Avison	257	10	+3.7
Conservative	Jayne Fleet	203	7.9	+2.4
Majority		1,018	39.7	+9.6
Turnout		2,564	36	+0.1
Liberal Democrats hold		Swing	+4.35	

== Weetslade ==
North Tyneside Council Elections: Weetslade ward 2008
Party	Candidate	Votes	%	±%
Conservative	Duncan McLellan	1,709	47.4	−1.1
Labour	Stuart Hill	1,488	41.3	+1.9
Liberal Democrats	Tricia Dawson	408	11.3	+3
Majority		221	6.1	−0.9
Turnout		3,605	48.3	0
Conservative hold		Swing	-1.5	

== Whitley Bay ==
North Tyneside Council Elections: Whitley Bay ward 2008
Party	Candidate	Votes	%	±%
Conservative	Michael McIntyre	1,823	65.3	+8.6
Labour	Keith Smiles	969	34.7	−0.4
Majority		863	30.6	+9.0
Turnout		2,792	40	−2
Conservative hold		Swing	+4.5	

Preceded by 2007 North Tyneside Council election	North Tyneside local elections	Succeeded by 2009 North Tyneside Council mayoral election
