= 2023 North Tyneside Metropolitan Borough Council election =

2023 English local election

- 4 May 2023

21 of 60 seats on North Tyneside Metropolitan Borough Council 31 seats needed for a majority
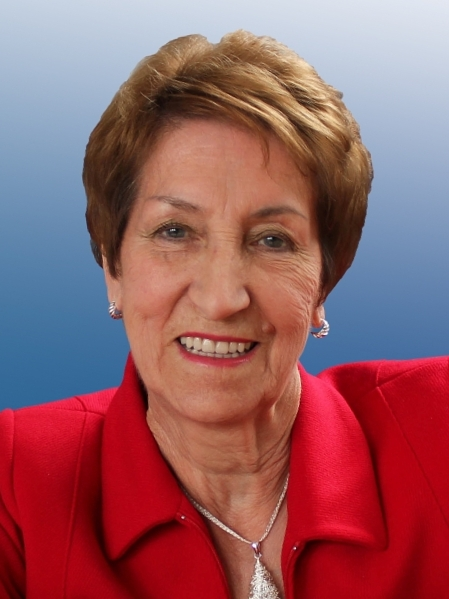

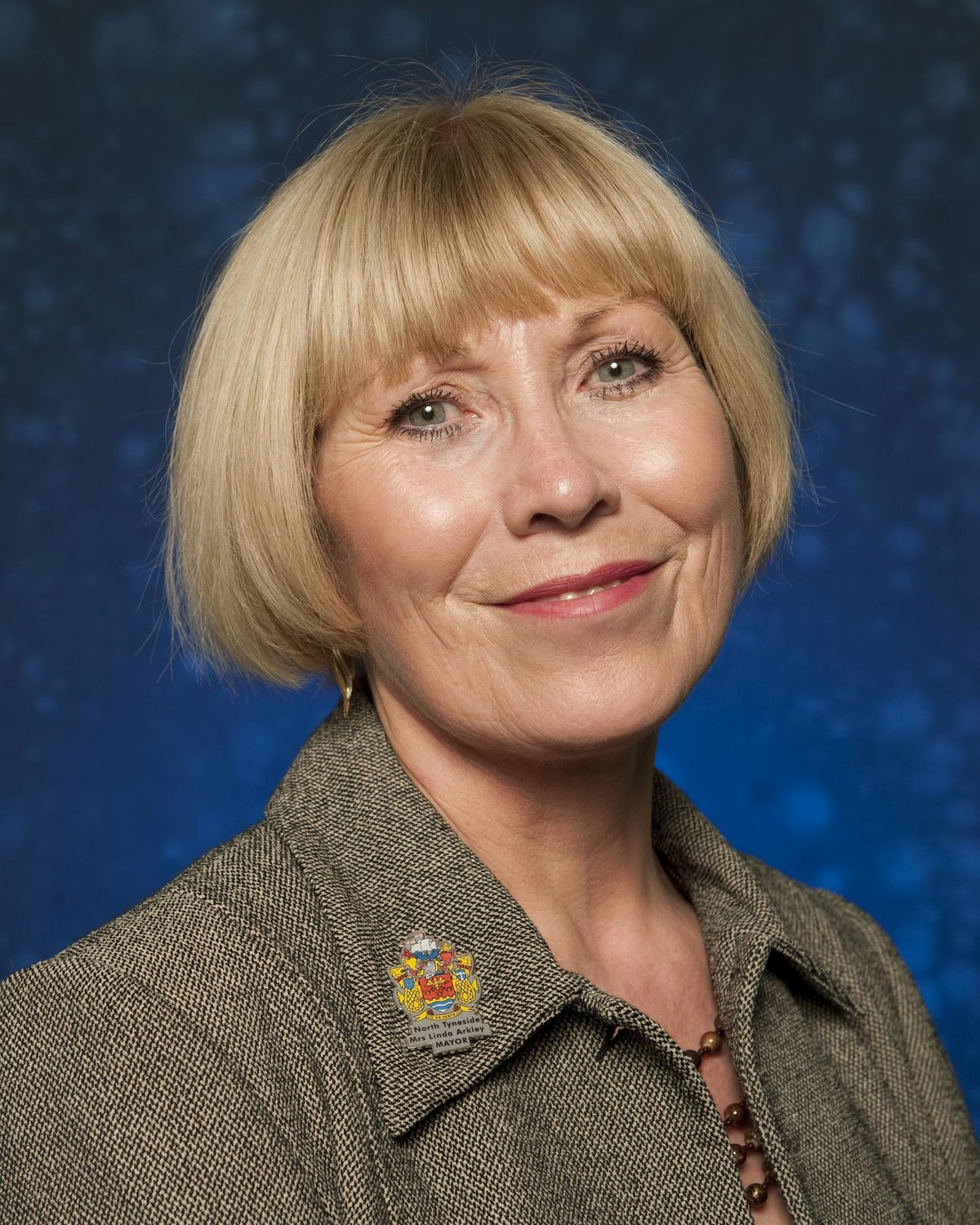

	First party	Second party	Third party
Leader	Norma Redfearn	Linda Arkley	Judith Wallace
Party	Labour	Conservative	Independent
Last election	51 seats, 54.9%	9 seats, 28.9%	0 seats, 1.7%
Seats before	51	6	3
Seats won	18	3	0
Seats after	51	7	2
Seat change	Steady	▲1	▼1
Popular vote	31,178	15,136	1,807
Percentage	55.5%	26.9%	3.2%
Swing	▲0.6%	▼2.0%	▲1.5%
- Winner of each seat at the 2023 North Tyneside Metropolitan Borough Council election
Council control before election
Labour
Control after election
Labour

The 2023 North Tyneside Metropolitan Borough Council elections were held on 4 May 2023 alongside other local elections in the United Kingdom. One third of the seats on the council were contested at this election. Labour retained its majority on the council.

== Background ==
The Local Government Act 1972 created a two-tier system of metropolitan counties and districts covering Greater Manchester, Merseyside, South Yorkshire, Tyne and Wear, the West Midlands, and West Yorkshire starting in 1974. North Tyneside was a district of the Tyne and Wear metropolitan county. The Local Government Act 1985 abolished the metropolitan counties, with metropolitan districts taking on most of their powers as metropolitan boroughs. The North of Tyne Combined Authority was created in 2018 and began electing the mayor of the North of Tyne from 2019, which was given strategic powers covering a region covering some of the same area as the former Tyne and Wear metropolitan county, as well as Northumberland.

Since its creation, North Tyneside has generally been under Labour control, with some periods of no overall control and Conservative Party control from 2008 to 2010. Labour has had an overall majority of seats on the council since the 2011 election, when the party gained seats. In the most recent council election in 2022, Labour won eighteen seats with 54.9% of the vote to hold 51 overall, while the Conservatives won two seats with 28.9% of the vote to hold nine seats overall. Most recently, Norma Redfearn has been the Labour mayor of North Tyneside since 2013, and she was last re-elected in 2021.

The positions up for election in 2023 were last elected in 2019. In that election, Labour won seventeen seats on 49.1% of the vote while the Conservatives won three seats with 27.1% of the vote. UKIP received 16.7% of the vote but didn't win any seats.

== Electoral process ==
The council elects its councillors in thirds, with a third being up for election every year for three years, with no election in the fourth year. The election will take place by first-past-the-post voting, with all wards being represented by three councillors, one of whom is elected each election year to serve a four-year term.

All registered electors (British, Irish, Commonwealth and European Union citizens) living in North Tyneside aged 18 or over will be entitled to vote in the election. People who live at two addresses in different councils, such as university students with different term-time and holiday addresses, are entitled to be registered for and vote in elections in both local authorities. Voting in-person at polling stations will take place from 07:00 to 22:00 on election day, and voters will be able to apply for postal votes or proxy votes in advance of the election.

As a result of the Elections Act 2022 electors will, for the first time, be required to present photo ID in order to cast their vote at the polling station.

== Summary ==
=== Council composition ===
After 2022 election		Before 2023 election		After 2023 election	
Party	Seats	Party	Seats	Party	Seats
Labour	51	Labour	51	Labour	51
Conservative	9	Conservative	6	Conservative	7
Independent	0	Independent	3	Independent	2

=== Election results ===
2023 North Tyneside Metropolitan Borough Council election
Party	This election				Full council			This election		
Party	Candidates	Seats	Net	Seats %	Other	Total	Total %	Votes	Votes %	+/−
Labour	{{{candidates}}}	18	Steady	85.7	33	51	87.9	31,178	55.5	+0.6
Conservative	{{{candidates}}}	3	▲1	14.3	4	7	12.1	15,136	26.9	–2.0
Independent	{{{candidates}}}	0	▼1	0.0	2	2	0.0	1,807	3.2	+1.5
Green	{{{candidates}}}	0	Steady	0.0	0	0	0.0	5,528	9.8	+0.4
Liberal Democrats	{{{candidates}}}	0	Steady	0.0	0	0	0.0	1,006	1.8	–1.7
Reform	{{{candidates}}}	0	Steady	0.0	0	0	0.0	686	1.2	+1.0
TUSC	{{{candidates}}}	0	Steady	0.0	0	0	0.0	594	1.1	+0.4
UKIP	{{{candidates}}}	0	Steady	0.0	0	0	0.0	285	0.5	–0.2

== Ward results ==
=== Battle Hill ===
Battle Hill
Party	Candidate	Votes	%	±%
Labour	Julie Cruddas*	1,605	66.8	±0.0
Conservative	Jean Murray	513	21.4	+0.8
Green	Helen Bell	190	7.9	–0.4
TUSC	Brian Toft	94	3.9	N/A
Majority		1,092	45.4	
Turnout		2,402	31.0	
Labour hold		Swing	▼0.4	

=== Benton ===
Benton
Party	Candidate	Votes	%	±%
Labour	Janet Hunter*	1,602	54.0	+3.7
Independent	David Arthur	795	26.8	+7.9
Conservative	David Sarin	354	11.9	–5.1
Green	Allie Wilson Craw	217	7.3	+1.1
Majority		807	27.2	
Turnout		2,968	39.0	
Labour hold		Swing	▼2.1	

=== Camperdown ===
Camperdown (2 seats due to by-election)
Party	Candidate	Votes	%	±%
Labour	Tracy Hallway	1,279	76.8	+8.4
Labour	Steve Cox	1,171	70.4	+2.0
Conservative	David Lilly	465	27.9	+3.6
Green	John Morley	208	12.5	+5.2
Liberal Democrats	Harriet Stanway	206	12.4	N/A
Turnout			25.0	
Labour hold				
Labour hold				

=== Chirton ===
Chirton
Party	Candidate	Votes	%	±%
Labour	Matthew Thirlaway	1,064	59.3	+5.0
Conservative	Stephen Bones	377	21.0	–1.2
Green	Michael Newton	145	8.1	+0.4
TUSC	William Jarrett	112	6.2	–5.2
UKIP	Jack Thomson	95	5.3	+0.9
Majority		687	38.3	
Turnout		1,793	23.0	
Labour hold		Swing	▲3.1	

=== Collingwood ===
Collingwood
Party	Candidate	Votes	%	±%
Conservative	John Johnsson	1,889	57.5	+5.6
Labour	Jack Proud	1,191	36.2	–5.0
Green	Penny Remfry	207	6.3	–0.6
Majority		698	21.3	
Turnout		3,287	40.0	
Conservative gain from Labour		Swing	▲5.3	

=== Cullercoats ===
Cullercoats
Party	Candidate	Votes	%	±%
Labour	Andrew Spowart	1,700	47.0	–1.3
Conservative	Steven Robinson	1,493	41.3	+0.6
Green	Sophie McGlinn	320	8.8	+0.5
UKIP	Pamela Hood	103	2.8	+1.2
Majority		207	5.7	
Turnout		3,616	49.0	
Labour gain from Conservative		Swing	▼1.0	

=== Howdon ===
Howdon
Party	Candidate	Votes	%	±%
Labour	John Harrison*	1,305	71.0	+1.0
Conservative	Connor Bones	295	16.0	–3.6
Green	Martin Collins	239	13.0	+2.6
Majority		1,010	55.0	
Turnout		1,839	24.0	
Labour hold		Swing	▲2.3	

=== Killingworth ===
Killingworth
Party	Candidate	Votes	%	±%
Labour	Erin Parker*	1,660	59.9	+1.0
Conservative	John Ord	782	28.2	–0.3
Green	Deb Altman	330	11.9	+5.1
Majority		878	31.7	
Turnout		2,772	31.0	
Labour hold		Swing	▲0.7	

=== Longbenton ===
Longbenton
Party	Candidate	Votes	%	±%
Labour	Karen Clark*	1,597	67.7	–1.2
Conservative	Mary Laver	356	15.1	–2.8
Green	Steve Manchee	193	8.2	–4.9
Liberal Democrats	Patricia Briscol	119	5.0	N/A
TUSC	Dan George	95	4.0	N/A
Majority		1,241	52.6	
Turnout		2,360	28.0	
Labour hold		Swing	▲0.8	

=== Monkseaton North ===
Monkseaton North
Party	Candidate	Votes	%	±%
Labour	Andy Holdsworth	1,891	59.9	–7.9
Conservative	George Partis	787	24.9	+2.2
Green	Ian Jones	309	9.8	+4.6
Liberal Democrats	David Nisbet	169	5.4	+1.2
Majority		1,104	35.0	
Turnout		3,156	47.0	
Labour hold		Swing	▼5.1	

=== Monkseaton South ===
Monkseaton South
Party	Candidate	Votes	%	±%
Labour Co-op	Davey Drummond*	1,860	58.5	+7.9
Conservative	Stewart Hay	871	27.4	–12.3
Green	Neil Percival	279	8.8	–0.9
Reform	Steve Alder	171	5.4	N/A
Majority		989	31.1	
Turnout		3,181	42.0	
Labour Co-op hold		Swing	▲10.1	

=== Northumberland ===
Northumberland
Party	Candidate	Votes	%	±%
Labour	Andy Newman*	1,333	66.1	+1.5
Conservative	Steven Corbett	422	20.9	–2.7
Green	Claire Wedderman	263	13.0	+1.2
Majority		911	45.2	
Turnout		2,018	27.0	
Labour hold		Swing	▲2.1	

=== Preston ===
Preston
Party	Candidate	Votes	%	±%
Labour Co-op	Matt Wilson*	1,456	49.3	–0.1
Conservative	Neil Graham	1,198	40.6	–0.4
Green	Ian Appleby	225	7.6	+2.6
UKIP	Jamie Baker	72	2.4	+0.8
Majority		258	8.7	
Turnout		2,951	45.0	
Labour Co-op hold		Swing	▲0.3	

=== Riverside ===
Riverside
Party	Candidate	Votes	%	±%
Labour	Wendy Lott*	1,146	57.4	–2.8
Conservative	Jay Bartoli	444	22.3	±0.0
Green	Nick Martin	274	13.7	+1.7
TUSC	Stephanie Anderson	131	6.6	+1.1
Majority		702	35.1	
Turnout		1,995	24.0	
Labour hold		Swing	▼1.4	

=== St Mary's ===
St Mary's Ward
Party	Candidate	Votes	%	±%
Conservative	Ian McAlpine	1,366	37.2	–14.8
Labour	Robbie Loughney	1,071	29.1	+3.5
Independent	George Crighton Westwater	916	24.9	N/A
Liberal Democrats	Janet Elizabeth Appleby	162	4.4	–8.4
Green	Kate Elizabeth Percival	161	4.4	+4.4
Majority		295	8.1	–18.3
Turnout		3,676	49	–0.2
Conservative gain from Independent		Swing	▼9.2	

=== Tynemouth ===
Tynemouth
Party	Candidate	Votes	%	±%
Conservative	Lewis Bartoli*	1,757	43.9	+5.5
Labour	Michael Morris	1,737	43.4	–6.4
Green	Simon Smithson	292	7.3	–2.7
Independent	Frank Austin	96	2.4	N/A
TUSC	Siobhan Coogan	63	1.6	N/A
Reform	Marcus Kitson	46	1.1	N/A
UKIP	Henry Marshall	15	0.4	–1.3
Majority		20	0.5	
Turnout		4,006	48.0	
Conservative hold		Swing	▲6.0	

=== Valley ===
Valley
Party	Candidate	Votes	%	±%
Labour	Carole Burdis*	1,674	63.4	–1.1
Conservative	Wayne Kavanagh	440	16.7	–4.2
Green	Roger Maier	287	10.9	+0.2
Reform	Gordon Fletcher	240	9.1	+5.2
Majority		1,234	46.7	
Turnout		2,641	26.0	
Labour hold		Swing	▲1.6	

=== Wallsend ===
Wallsend
Party	Candidate	Votes	%	±%
Labour	Ian Grayson	1,413	67.0	±0.0
Conservative	David Steven	286	13.6	–2.4
Green	Julia Hayward	218	10.3	+2.3
Reform	Richard Oliver	133	6.3	N/A
TUSC	Wendy Jackson	58	2.8	N/A
Majority		1,127	53.4	
Turnout		2,108	28.0	
Labour hold		Swing	▲1.2	

=== Weetslade ===
Weetslade
Party	Candidate	Votes	%	±%
Labour	Sarah Burtenshaw	1,635	58.2	+14.3
Conservative	Susan Rodgerson	716	25.5	+4.5
Liberal Democrats	John Appleby	300	10.7	–24.4
Green	Carole Nissen	158	5.6	N/A
Majority		919	32.7	
Turnout		2,809	35.0	
Labour hold		Swing	▲4.9	

=== Whitley Bay ===
Whitley Bay Ward
Party	Candidate	Votes	%	±%
Labour	John O’Shea*	1,788	54.0	+3.5
Green	Alan Steele	1,013	30.6	–4.9
Conservative	Janet Ilderton	325	9.8	–2.9
Reform	Kirsty Ann Alder	96	2.9	N/A
Liberal Democrats	Vera Elliott	50	1.5	N/A
TUSC	John Hoare	41	1.2	±0.0
Majority		775	23.3	+8.3
Turnout		3,313	45.1	–2.4
Labour hold		Swing	▲4.2	
