= 2024 North Tyneside Metropolitan Borough Council election =

Local election in England

- 2 May 2024

All 60 seats to North Tyneside Council 31 seats needed for a majority
- Turnout: 37% (▲6pp)
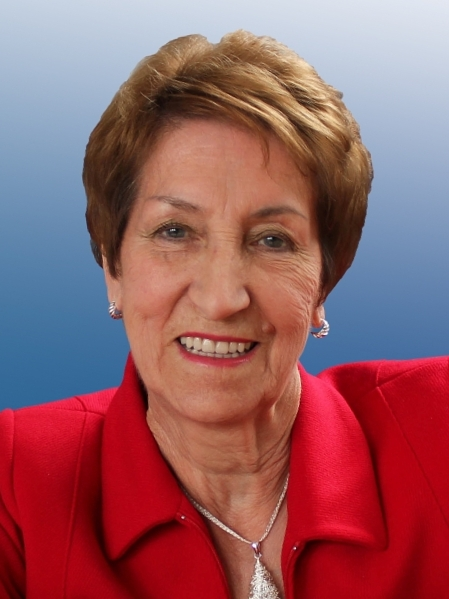

	Majority party	Minority party	Third party
Leader	Norma Redfearn	Liam Bones	Cath Davis/Judith Wallace (Note: Of the six independent councillors prior to the election, four formed the "Community Independent" group led by Cath Davis, the other two formed the "Independent Group" led by Judith Wallace.)
Party	Labour	Conservative	Independent
Last election	51 seats, 55.5%	7 seats, 26.9%	2 seats, 3.2%
Seats before	47 (Note: Including one vacant seat last held by Labour.)	7 (Note: Including one vacant seat last held by Conservatives.)	6
Seats won	51	8	1
Seat change	▲4	▲1	▼5
Council control before election
Labour
Control after election
Labour

The 2024 North Tyneside Metropolitan Borough Council election was held on Thursday 2 May 2024, alongside the other local elections held in the United Kingdom on the same day. All seats were up for election following boundary changes. Labour retained its majority on the council.

== Background ==
Results from the previous election in 2023

The Local Government Act 1972 created a two-tier system of metropolitan counties and districts covering Greater Manchester, Merseyside, South Yorkshire, Tyne and Wear, the West Midlands, and West Yorkshire starting in 1974. North Tyneside was a district of the Tyne and Wear metropolitan county. The Local Government Act 1985 abolished the metropolitan counties, with metropolitan districts taking on most of their powers as metropolitan boroughs. The North of Tyne Combined Authority was created in 2018 and began electing the mayor of the North of Tyne from 2019, which was given strategic powers covering a region covering some of the same area as the former Tyne and Wear metropolitan county, as well as Northumberland.

Since its creation, North Tyneside has generally been under Labour control, with some periods of no overall control and Conservative Party control from 2008 to 2010. Labour has had an overall majority of seats on the council since the 2011 election, when the party gained seats. In the most recent council election in 2023, Labour won eighteen seats with 55.5% of the vote, while the Conservatives won three seats with 26.9% of the vote. Norma Redfearn has been the Labour mayor of North Tyneside since 2013, and she was last re-elected in 2021.

Due to a boundary review and change by the Local Government Boundary Commission for England, all 60 seats to North Tyneside Metropolitan Borough Council were up for election.

== Boundary changes ==
New ward boundaries came into effect for this election, requiring all seats to be contested instead of the usual third of the council.

Old wards	No. of seats	New wards	No. of seats
Battle Hill	3	Backworth and Holystone	3
Benton	3	Battle Hill	3
Camperdown	3	Camperdown	3
Chirton	3	Chirton and Percy Main	3
Collingwood	3	Cullercoats and Whitley Bay South	3
Cullercoats	3	Forest Hall	3
Howdon	3	Howdon	3
Killingworth	3	Killingworth	3
Longbenton	3	Longbenton and Benton	3
Monkseaton North	3	Monkseaton	3
Monkseaton South	3	New York and Murton	3
Northumberland	3	North Shields	3
Preston	3	Preston with Preston Grange	3
Riverside	3	Shiremoor	3
St Mary's	3	St Mary's	3
Tynemouth	3	Tynemouth	3
Valley	3	Wallsend Central	3
Wallsend	3	Wallsend North	3
Weetslade	3	Weetslade	3
Whitley Bay	3	Whitley Bay North	3

== Electoral process ==
The council elects its councillors in thirds, with a third being up for election every year for three years, with no election in the fourth year. The election took place by first-past-the-post voting, with all wards being represented by three councillors, one of whom is elected each election year to serve a four-year term.

All registered electors (British, Irish, Commonwealth and European Union citizens) living in North Tyneside aged 18 or over were entitled to vote in the election. People who live at two addresses in different councils, such as university students with different term-time and holiday addresses, are entitled to be registered for and vote in elections in both local authorities. Voting in-person at polling stations took place from 07:00 to 22:00 on election day, and voters were able to apply for postal votes or proxy votes in advance of the election.

As a result of the Elections Act 2022 electors were required to present photo ID in order to cast their vote at the polling station.

== Summary ==
=== Council composition ===
After 2023 election		Before 2024 election		After 2024 election	
Party	Seats	Party	Seats	Party	Seats
Labour	51	Labour	46	Labour	51
Conservative	7	Conservative	6	Conservative	8
Independent	2	Independent	6	Independent	1

Changes:

- June 2023: Cath Davis and Gary Madden both resign from the Labour Party and sit as independents.
- July 2023: Michelle Fox and Val Jamieson resign from the Labour Party and form the Community Independent Group with Cath Davis and Gary Madden.
- 13 October 2023: Linda Arkley (Conservative) died; seat remains vacant until the regularly scheduled May 2024 elections.
- 15 January 2024: Carole Burdis (Labour) died; seat remained vacant until the regularly scheduled May 2024 elections.

=== Election results ===
2024 North Tyneside Metropolitan Borough Council election
Party	Seats	Gains	Losses	Net gain/loss	Seats %	Votes %	Votes	+/−
Labour	51	5	0	▲5	85.0	58.0	81,190	+2.5
Conservative	8	2	0	▲2	13.3	18.1	25,315	–8.8
Independent	1	0	5	▼5	1.7	5.7	7,981	+2.5
Green	0	0	0	Steady	0.0	13.9	19,506	+4.1
Reform	0	0	0	Steady	0.0	2.0	2,803	+0.8
Liberal Democrats	0	0	0	Steady	0.0	1.4	1,981	–0.4
TUSC	0	0	0	Steady	0.0	0.6	822	-0.5
Workers Party	0	0	0	Steady	0.0	0.2	341	N/A

== Ward results ==
Sources for results:

An asterisk indicates an incumbent councillor A double asterisk indicates an incumbent councillor who stood in a different ward not associated geographically with the ward they previously represented

=== Backworth and Holystone ===
Backworth and Holystone
Party	Candidate	Votes	%	±%
Labour	Louise Amanda Bell	1,167	58.9	
Labour	Nigel John Huscroft	964	48.6	
Labour	James Webster	926	46.7	
Conservative	Alexander James Amos	533	26.9	
Conservative	Chike Anieto	531	26.8	
Green	Aragorn Joe Jones	506	25.5	
Turnout		1,983	30.3	

=== Battle Hill ===
Battle Hill
Party	Candidate	Votes	%	±%
Labour	Julie Elizabeth Cruddas*	1,614	63.3	
Labour	Carl John Johnson*	1,427	55.9	
Labour	Steve Phillips*	1,314	51.5	
Conservative	Janet Ilderton	520	20.4	
Green	Nick Martin	477	18.7	
Turnout		2,551	32.9	

=== Camperdown ===
Camperdown
Party	Candidate	Votes	%	±%
Labour	Tracy Ann Hallway*	1,136	57.4	
Labour	Steve Cox*	1,111	56.2	
Labour	Joan Isabel Walker**	999	50.5	
Green	Adam Paul Greenwold	622	31.4	
Turnout		1,978	27.9	

=== Chirton and Percy Main ===
Chirton and Percy Main
Party	Candidate	Votes	%	±%
Labour	Rebecca O'Keefe*	1,116	51.7	
Labour	Hannah Patricia Johnson*	1,079	50.0	
Labour	Charles Bruce Pickard*	896	41.5	
Reform	Michael Harrigan	436	20.2	
Conservative	Stephen Patrick Bones	360	16.7	
Green	Chloe Fawcett Reilly	338	15.7	
Green	Janet Irene Mellor	291	13.5	
TUSC	Peter Robson	209	9.7	
Turnout		2,158	24.2	

=== Cullercoats and Whitley Bay South ===
Cullercoats and Whitley Bay South
Party	Candidate	Votes	%	±%
Labour	Jane Shaw**	2,222	51.2	
Labour	Willie Samuel*	2,036	47.0	
Labour	Andrew James Spowart*	1,730	39.9	
Green	Ian Appleby	1,204	27.8	
Conservative	Ken Barrie	884	20.4	
Conservative	David James Steven	857	19.8	
Green	Claire Emma Wedderman	742	17.1	
Green	Sophie Joanna McGlinn	725	16.7	
Independent	Rie Pearson	565	13.0	
TUSC	John Hoare	200	4.6	
Turnout		4,336	48.8	

=== Forest Hall ===
Forest Hall
Party	Candidate	Votes	%	±%
Labour	Janet Hunter*	1,797	58.5	
Labour	Peter Gerard Earley	1,569	51.1	
Labour	Joanna Marie Sharp	1,344	43.8	
Independent	Stuart Clark Hill	886	28.9	
Liberal Democrats	John Christopher Appleby	411	13.4	
Green	Deborah Altman	406	13.2	
Conservative	Joshua Thomas Clark	393	12.8	
Green	Julia Buus Florentine	289	9.4	
Green	Mark James Martinez	226	7.4	
Turnout		3,070	40.2	

=== Howdon ===
Howdon
Party	Candidate	Votes	%	±%
Labour	Linda Isobel Bell**	1,281	53.4	
Labour	John Lawrence Langford Harrison*	1,273	53.0	
Labour	Matthew Brian Thirlaway**	1,061	44.2	
Independent	Maureen Louise Madden	533	22.2	
Reform	Janice Richardson	428	17.8	
Green	Michael John Renner	322	13.4	
Conservative	Connor Bones	250	10.4	
Turnout		2,400	26.3	

=== Killingworth ===
Killingworth
Party	Candidate	Votes	%	±%
Labour	Pat Oliver**	1,356	58.7	
Labour	Paul Bunyan	1,287	55.7	
Labour	Bryan Shaun Clark	1,209	52.4	
Conservative	David Sarin	617	26.7	
Green	Isaac Duncan Ford	510	22.1	
Turnout		2,309	35.5	

=== Longbenton and Benton ===
Longbenton and Benton
Party	Candidate	Votes	%	±%
Labour	Karen Anne Clark*	1,610	65.4	
Labour	Eddie Darke*	1,445	58.7	
Labour	Linda Darke	1,311	53.2	
Green	Fiona Gray	619	25.1	
Reform	Brian Smith	370	15.0	
TUSC	Dan George	256	10.4	
Turnout		2,463	32.8	

=== Monkseaton ===
Monkseaton
Party	Candidate	Votes	%	±%
Labour	Davey Drummond*	2,238	56.9	
Labour	Sarah Day**	1,967	50.0	
Labour	Martin James Murphy*	1,772	45.1	
Conservative	Stewart Thomas Hay	1,073	27.3	
Green	Kate Elizabeth Percival	605	15.4	
Green	Thomas Dehler	473	12.0	
Liberal Democrats	Vera Elliott	400	10.2	
Green	Neil Percival	376	9.6	
TUSC	Lee Dickson	157	4.0	
Turnout		3,931	45.2	

=== New York and Murton ===
New York and Murton
Party	Candidate	Votes	%	±%
Conservative	Olly Scargill*	1,346	64.2	
Conservative	Claire Louise McGinty	961	45.8	
Conservative	Jay Luca Bartoli	902	43.0	
Labour	Peter John Martin	616	29.4	
Labour	Oskar Andrew Avery	609	29.1	
Labour	Ryan Alexander Jason Carter	599	28.6	
Green	Penny Remfry	217	10.4	
Turnout		2,096	34.7	

=== North Shields ===
North Shields
Party	Candidate	Votes	%	±%
Labour	Wendy Lott*	1,316	46.4	
Labour	Josephine Mudzingwa**	1,289	45.4	
Labour	Frank Lott*	1,245	43.9	
Green	Martin Anthony Osborne	583	20.5	
Independent	Karen Marie Weech	490	17.3	
Independent	Sarah Elizabeth Graham	472	16.6	
Independent	Chris Johnston	469	16.5	
Conservative	Adam Thewlis	390	13.7	
Conservative	David Charles Office	367	12.9	
Liberal Democrats	Charis Pollard	322	11.3	
Workers Party	William George Jarrett	167	5.9	
Turnout		2,839	35.4	

=== Preston with Preston Grange ===
Preston with Preston Grange
Party	Candidate	Votes	%	±%
Conservative	Liam Adam Bones*	1,717	48.5	
Conservative	John Joseph Johnsson*	1,557	44.0	
Conservative	David Wallace Lilly	1,394	39.4	
Labour	Mark Ellis	1,136	32.1	
Labour	Michael Morris	1,013	28.6	
Independent	Cath Davis*	821	23.2	
Labour	Raz Razaq	773	21.8	
Green	Nick Fitzsimons	498	14.1	
Turnout		3,540	47.4	

=== Shiremoor ===
Shiremoor
Party	Candidate	Votes	%	±%
Labour	Brian Burdis*	1,318	57.6	
Labour	Tommy Mulvenna*	1,189	52.0	
Labour	Kristin Dominica Nott	1,018	44.5	
Green	Caron Louise Kirkham	633	27.7	
Reform	Gordon Fletcher	515	22.5	
Green	Carole Ann Nissen	362	15.8	
Green	Roger Werner Maier	293	12.8	
Turnout		2,287	30.0	

=== St Mary's ===
St Mary's
Party	Candidate	Votes	%	±%
Conservative	Ian McAlpine*	1,510	35.4	
Labour	Andy Holdsworth	1,373	32.2	
Independent	Judith Wallace*	1,320	30.9	
Labour	David Charles Slater	1,232	28.9	
Independent	Pam McIntyre*	1,222	28.6	
Conservative	Trish Gargett	1,182	27.7	
Conservative	Steven Paul Robinson	1,179	27.6	
Labour	George Crighton Westwater	947	22.2	
Independent	Stuart Gordon Murray	818	19.2	
Green	Vicki Parry	403	9.4	
Liberal Democrats	Janet Elizabeth Appleby	341	8.0	
Turnout		4,269	52.8	

=== Tynemouth ===
Tynemouth
Party	Candidate	Votes	%	±%
Conservative	Lewis Carlo Bartoli*	1,876	44.5	
Labour	Tom Bailey	1,757	41.7	
Labour	Julie Day	1,712	40.6	
Conservative	Chris Johnston*	1,688	40.1	
Conservative	John Ord	1,659	39.4	
Labour	Daniel George Gray	1,380	32.8	
Green	Matt Williams	692	16.4	
Independent	Helen Smith	385	9.1	
Turnout		4,212	53.6	

=== Wallsend Central ===
Wallsend Central
Party	Candidate	Votes	%	±%
Labour	Louise Dolores Marshall*	1,329	54.1	
Labour	Charlie Gray	1,267	51.6	
Labour	Ian Raymond Grayson*	1,233	50.2	
Green	Martin Collins	590	24.0	
Reform	Richard Oliver	483	19.7	
Green	Julia Hayward	447	18.2	
Green	Sophie Hayward-Pattison	401	16.3	
Turnout		2,455	31.4	

=== Wallsend North ===
Wallsend North
Party	Candidate	Votes	%	±%
Labour	Andy Newman*	1,416	54.8	
Labour	Jim Montague*	1,358	52.5	
Labour	Tricia Neira**	1,236	47.8	
Reform	Rosie Elliott	571	22.1	
Green	Ian Jones	553	21.4	
Green	Allie Wilson Craw	380	14.7	
Green	John Graham Morley	315	12.2	
Turnout		2,585	29.9	

=== Weetslade ===
Weetslade
Party	Candidate	Votes	%	±%
Labour	Sarah Ellen Burtenshaw*	1,426	50.5	
Labour	Anthony William McMullen*	1,378	48.8	
Labour	Liz McMullen	1,356	48.0	
Conservative	Michael Andrew Pickering	785	27.8	
Conservative	Heather Victoria Halliday Amos	784	27.8	
Green	Michael Andrew Newton	614	21.7	
Turnout		2,825	36.0	

=== Whitley Bay North ===
Whitley Bay North
Party	Candidate	Votes	%	±%
Labour	Joe Kirwin*	2,233	53.6	
Labour	John O'Shea*	2,161	51.9	
Labour	Sandra Maria Graham*	2,018	48.5	
Green	Alan Steele	1,580	38.0	
Green	Helen MacKenzie Bell	1,226	29.4	
Green	Richard Smithson	988	23.7	
Liberal Democrats	David Nisbet	507	12.2	
Workers Party	Gordon Bell	174	4.2	
Turnout		4,163	49.2	

== By-elections ==
=== Killingworth ===
A by-election was triggered after the resignation of councillor Pat Oliver.

Killingworth by-election: 2 July 2025
Party	Candidate	Votes	%	±%
Reform	Brian Smith	771	38.5	N/A
Labour	Lucy Dixon	639	31.9	–22.7
Conservative	Alexander Amos	429	21.4	–3.4
Green	Ian Jones	85	4.2	–16.3
Liberal Democrats	Emma Vinton	81	4.0	N/A
Majority		132	6.6	N/A
Turnout		2,005	30.3	–5.2
Reform gain from Labour				

=== Longbenton & Benton ===
A by-election was triggered after councillor Karen Clark was elected as mayor.

Longbenton & Benton by-election: 2 July 2025
Party	Candidate	Votes	%	±%
Labour	Bryan Macdonald	739	39.6	–16.8
Reform	John Falkensten	602	32.3	+19.3
Green	Jim Howard	259	13.9	–7.8
Liberal Democrats	David Nisbet	183	9.8	N/A
Conservative	Joshua Clark	83	4.4	N/A
Majority		137	7.3	N/A
Turnout		1,866	24.7	–8.1
Labour hold		Swing	▼18.1	
