= 2026 North Tyneside Council election =

2026 English local government election

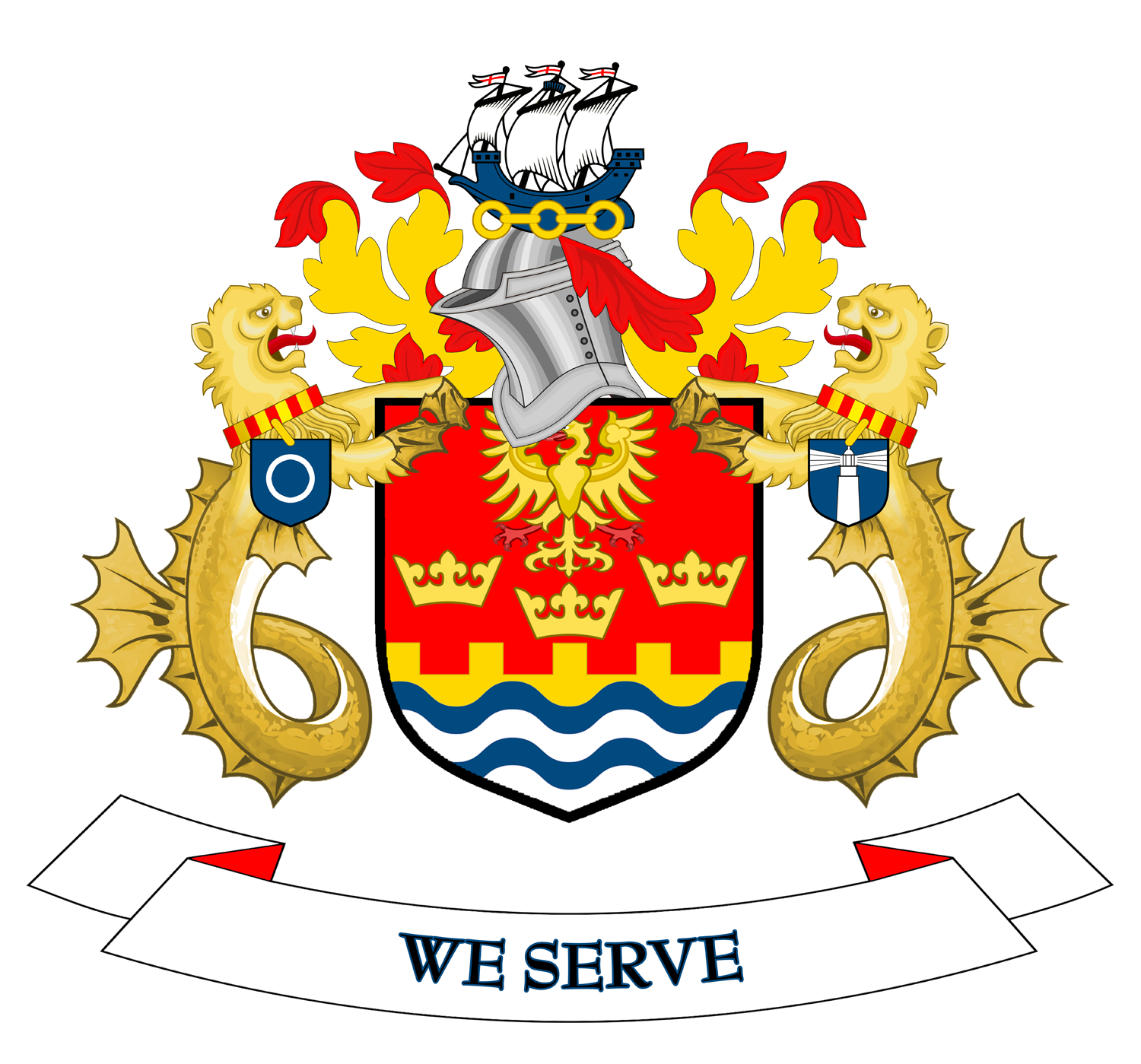
- 7 May 2026

20 out of 60 seats to North Tyneside Council 31 seats needed for a majority
- Registered: 158,952
- Turnout: 67,520; 42.5%
	Majority party	Minority party	Third party
Leader	Karen Clark	None	John Johnsson
Party	Labour	Reform	Conservative
Last election	51 seats, 58.0%	0 seats, 2.0%	8 seats, 18.1%
Seats before	50	1	8
Seats won	5	10	2
Seats after	38	11	8
Seat change	▼12	▲10	Steady
Popular vote	19,607	20,914	10,062
Percentage	29.0%	30.9%	14.9%
Swing	▼29.0%	▲28.9%	▼3.2%
	Fourth party	Fifth party
Leader		Judith Wallace
Party	Green	Independent
Last election	0 seats, 13.9%	1 seat, 5.7%
Seats before	0	1
Seats won	2	1
Seats after	2	1
Seat change	▲2	Steady
Popular vote	13,356	1,507
Percentage	19.7%	2.2%
Swing	▲5.8%	▼3.5%
- Winner of each seat at the 2026 North Tyneside Council election.
Council control before election
Labour
Control after election
Labour

The 2026 North Tyneside Council election took place on 7 May 2026, alongside other local elections in the United Kingdom. One third of the 60 members of North Tyneside Council in Tyne and Wear were elected. The council's directly elected Mayor of North Tyneside was not up for election this year.

At this election, Labour retained overall control of the council, but with a significantly reduced majority. Reform UK won half the seats contested at this election, which saw them overtake the Conservatives to become the second largest party on the council.

== Background ==
North Tyneside Metropolitan Borough Council was created in 1974. Labour saw early success, controlling the council (apart from a brief period of no overall control 1986 to 1987) from its creation until 2004, when the council fell into no overall control. That election also saw the Conservatives become the largest party on the council, which was maintained until 2010. The Conservatives additionally formed the only non-Labour majority administration following the 2008 election. Labour have formed majority administrations since retaking control in 2011, with the Conservatives acting as the principal opposition.

The 2024 election used a new set of ward boundaries - as such, this election will be for the councillors elected with the fewest votes in each of the 30 three-member wards. Labour will be defending 17 seats, the Conservatives will be defending 2, and independents will be defending 1.

== Summary ==
=== Council composition ===
After 2024 election		Before 2026 election		After 2026 election	
Party	Seats	Party	Seats	Party	Seats
Labour	51	Labour	50	Labour	38
Reform	0	Reform	1	Reform	11
Conservative	8	Conservative	8	Conservative	8
Green	0	Green	0	Green	2
Independent	1	Independent	1	Independent	1

Changes 2024–2026:

- May 2025:
  - Karen Clark (Labour) elected as Mayor, thus leaving her council seat vacant – by-election held July 2025
  - Pat Oliver (Labour) resigns – by-election held July 2025
- July 2025:
  - Brian Smith (Reform) gains by-election from Labour
  - Bryan Macdonald (Labour) wins by-election

=== Election result ===
2026 North Tyneside Borough Council election
Party	This election				Full council			This election		
Party	Candidates	Seats	Net	Seats %	Other	Total	Total %	Votes	Votes %	+/−
Labour	{{{candidates}}}	5	▼12	25.0	33	38	63.3	19,607	29.0	–29.0
Reform	{{{candidates}}}	10	▲10	50.0	1	11	18.3	20,914	30.9	+28.9
Conservative	{{{candidates}}}	2	Steady	10.0	6	8	13.3	10,062	14.9	–3.2
Green	{{{candidates}}}	2	▲2	10.0	0	2	3.3	13,356	19.7	+5.8
Independent	{{{candidates}}}	1	Steady	5.0	0	1	1.7	1,507	2.2	–3.5
Liberal Democrats	{{{candidates}}}	0	Steady	0.0	0	0	0.0	1,573	2.3	+0.9
NTCI	{{{candidates}}}	0	Steady	0.0	0	0	0.0	564	0.8	N/A
SDP	{{{candidates}}}	0	Steady	0.0	0	0	0.0	81	0.1	N/A
Workers Party	{{{candidates}}}	0	Steady	0.0	0	0	0.0	49	0.1	–0.1

== Incumbents ==
Ward	Incumbent councillor	Party	Re-standing
Backworth & Holystone	James Webster	Labour	No
Battle Hill	Steven Phillips	Labour	Yes
Camperdown	Joan Walker	Labour	Yes
Chirton & Percy Man	Bruce Pickard	Labour	Yes
Cullercoats & Whitley; Bay South	Andrew Spowart	Labour	No
Forest Hall	Joanne Sharp	Labour	Yes
Howdon	Matthew Thirlaway	Labour	Yes
Killingworth	Bryan Clark	Labour	Yes
Longbenton & Benton	Linda Darke	Labour	Yes
Monkseaton	Martin Murphy	Labour	Yes
New York & Murton	Jay Bartoli	Conservative	Yes (Note: Standing in Tynemouth ward.)
North Shields	Frank Lott	Labour	Yes
Preston with Preston Grange	David Lilly	Conservative	Yes
Shiremoor	Kristin Nott	Labour	Yes
St Mary's	Judith Wallace	Independent	Yes
Tynemouth	Julie Day	Labour	Yes
Wallsend Central	Ian Grayson	Labour	Yes
Wallsend North	Tricia Neira	Labour	Yes
Weetslade	Liz McMullen	Labour	Yes
Whitley Bay North	Sandra Graham	Labour	Yes

== Ward results ==
=== Backworth & Holystone ===
Backworth & Holystone
Party	Candidate	Votes	%	±%
Labour	Adam Thompson	1,042	39.3	−13.6
Reform	John Falkenstein	973	36.7	N/A
Green	Yara Rodrigues-Fowler	358	13.5	−9.4
Conservative	Christopher Johnston	279	10.5	−13.7
Majority		69	2.6	N/A
Turnout		2,663	39.8	+9.5
Registered electors		6,686		
Labour hold				

=== Battle Hill ===
Battle Hill
Party	Candidate	Votes	%	±%
Reform	Christopher Croft	1,299	43.3	N/A
Labour	Steven Phillips*	1,058	35.3	−26.5
Green	Nick Martin	413	13.8	−4.5
Conservative	David Office	231	7.7	−12.2
Majority		241	8.0	N/A
Turnout		3,008	38.4	+5.5
Registered electors		7,832		
Reform gain from Labour				

=== Camperdown ===
Camperdown
Party	Candidate	Votes	%	±%
Reform	Martin Uren	1,010	40.8	N/A
Labour	Joan Walker*	818	33.0	−31.6
Green	Michael Gibson	390	15.7	−19.7
Conservative	Rosemary Kinghorn	260	10.5	N/A
Majority		192	7.8	N/A
Turnout		2,481	33.7	+5.8
Registered electors		7,362		
Reform gain from Labour				

=== Chirton & Percy Main ===
Chirton & Percy Main
Party	Candidate	Votes	%	±%
Reform	Steven Robinson	1,353	48.0	+30.3
Labour	Bruce Pickard*	633	22.5	−22.9
Green	Jo Ellis	544	19.3	+5.6
Conservative	David Cross	208	7.4	−7.2
SDP	Peter John	81	2.9	N/A
Majority		720	25.5	N/A
Turnout		2,828	30.6	+6.4
Registered electors		9,249		
Reform gain from Labour		Swing	▲26.6	

=== Cullercoats & Whitley Bay South ===
Cullercoats & Whitley Bay South
Party	Candidate	Votes	%	±%
Labour	Paula Clough	1,473	31.8	−12.0
Green	Alan Steele	1,192	25.7	+2.0
Reform	Mark Holmes	1,015	21.9	N/A
Conservative	Ken Barrie	646	13.9	−3.5
Liberal Democrats	Penny Reid	257	5.5	N/A
Workers Party	Mark Belshaw	49	1.1	N/A
Majority		281	6.1	N/A
Turnout		4,645	51.8	+3.0
Registered electors		8,965		
Labour hold		Swing	▼7.0	

=== Forest Hall ===
Forest Hall
Party	Candidate	Votes	%	±%
Labour	Joanne Sharp*	1,204	35.2	−11.0
Reform	Sam Lambert	916	26.8	N/A
NTCI	Stuart Hill	564	16.5	N/A
Green	Michael Newton	500	14.6	+4.2
Conservative	Susan Rodgerson	238	7.0	−3.1
Majority		288	8.4	N/A
Turnout		3,430	44.9	+4.7
Registered electors		7,645		
Labour hold				

=== Howdon ===
Howdon
Party	Candidate	Votes	%	±%
Reform	Dan Robson	1,294	47.6	+32.4
Labour	Matthew Thirlaway*	736	27.1	−18.4
Green	Carole Nissen	500	18.4	+7.0
Conservative	Connor Bones	190	7.0	−1.9
Majority		558	20.5	N/A
Turnout		2,730	29.9	+3.6
Registered electors		9,121		
Reform gain from Labour		Swing	▲25.4	

=== Killingworth ===
Killingworth
Party	Candidate	Votes	%	±%
Reform	Mick Stobbart	1,134	42.5	N/A
Labour	Bryan Clark*	899	33.7	−20.9
Green	Fiona Gray	333	12.5	−8.0
Conservative	Paul McKinlay	303	11.4	−13.4
Majority		235	8.8	N/A
Turnout		2,674	40.7	+5.2
Registered electors		6,588		
Reform gain from Labour				

=== Longbenton & Benton ===
Longbenton & Benton
Party	Candidate	Votes	%	±%
Labour	Linda Darke*	1,019	36.0	−20.4
Reform	Mark Anderson	885	31.3	+18.3
Green	Ryan Crawford	612	21.6	−0.1
Conservative	Deborah Lennox	163	5.8	N/A
Liberal Democrats	Emma Vinton	149	5.3	N/A
Majority		134	4.7	N/A
Turnout		2,832	38.1	+5.3
Registered electors		7,443		
Labour hold		Swing	▼19.4	

=== Monkseaton ===
Monkseaton
Party	Candidate	Votes	%	±%
Labour	Martin Murphy*	1,470	33.7	−16.3
Reform	Nigel Parkinson	1,149	26.4	N/A
Green	Chloe-Louise Reilly	783	18.0	+4.5
Conservative	David Steven	612	14.0	−10.0
Liberal Democrats	John Appleby	346	7.9	−1.0
Majority		321	7.3	N/A
Turnout		4,369	50.4	+5.2
Registered electors		8,670		
Labour hold				

=== New York & Murton ===
New York & Murton
Party	Candidate	Votes	%	±%
Reform	Keith McAllister	800	37.4	N/A
Conservative	Daniel Inglis	588	27.5	−34.3
Labour	Peter Anderson	386	18.0	−10.3
Green	Sophie McGlinn	367	17.1	+7.1
Majority		212	9.9	N/A
Turnout		2,148	33.7	–1.0
Registered electors		6,370		
Reform gain from Conservative				

=== North Shields ===
North Shields
Party	Candidate	Votes	%	±%
Green	Martin Osborne	1,156	33.4	+15.6
Reform	Andrew Mitchinson	938	27.1	N/A
Labour	Frank Lott*	934	27.0	−13.3
Conservative	Maureen Jeffrey	274	7.9	−4.0
Liberal Democrats	Charis Pollard	154	4.5	−5.4
Majority		218	6.3	N/A
Turnout		3,466	42.4	+7.0
Registered electors		8,169		
Green gain from Labour				

=== Preston with Preston Grange ===
Preston with Preston Grange
Party	Candidate	Votes	%	±%
Conservative	David Lilly*	1,343	35.3	−5.9
Reform	Phillip McGuire	909	23.9	N/A
Labour	Fletcher Sowerby	902	23.7	−3.5
Green	Helen Smith-McGuire	651	17.1	+5.2
Majority		434	11.4	N/A
Turnout		3,811	51.3	+3.9
Registered electors		7,427		
Conservative hold				

=== Shiremoor ===
Shiremoor
Party	Candidate	Votes	%	±%
Reform	Michael Harrigan	1,076	37.1	+16.2
Green	Caron Kirkham	1,012	34.9	+9.2
Labour	Kristin Nott*	576	19.9	−33.5
Conservative	John Honeychurch-Kyle	237	8.2	N/A
Majority		64	2.2	N/A
Turnout		2,911	37.7	+7.7
Registered electors		7,724		
Reform gain from Labour		Swing	▲3.5	

=== St Mary's ===
St Mary's
Party	Candidate	Votes	%	±%
Independent	Judith Wallace*	1,507	31.6	+4.9
Conservative	George Partis	1,207	25.3	−5.2
Reform	Naysin Lambert	801	16.8	N/A
Labour Co-op	Jack Proud	729	15.3	−12.5
Green	Joanne Beynon	393	8.2	+0.1
Liberal Democrats	Janet Appleby	135	2.8	−4.1
Majority		300	6.3	N/A
Turnout		4,778	58.9	+6.1
Registered electors		8,111		
Independent hold		Swing	▲5.1	

=== Tynemouth ===
Tynemouth
Party	Candidate	Votes	%	±%
Conservative	Jay Bartoli*	1,680	38.8	−1.0
Labour Co-op	Julie Day*	1,312	30.3	−7.0
Green	Simon Smithson	690	16.0	+1.3
Reform	Steve May	644	14.9	N/A
Majority		368	8.5	N/A
Turnout		4,341	55.4	+1.8
Registered electors		7,832		
Conservative gain from Labour Co-op		Swing	▲3.0	

=== Wallsend Central ===
Wallsend Central
Party	Candidate	Votes	%	±%
Reform	Richard Oliver	1,022	35.8	+15.7
Labour	Ian Grayson*	945	33.1	−22.2
Green	Ian Appleby	700	24.5	−0.1
Conservative	Valerie Anderson	187	6.6	N/A
Majority		77	2.7	N/A
Turnout		2,861	36.0	+4.6
Registered electors		7,958		
Reform gain from Labour		Swing	▲19.0	

=== Wallsend North ===
Wallsend North
Party	Candidate	Votes	%	±%
Reform	Iain Graham	1,463	43.8	+21.3
Labour	Tricia Neira*	906	27.1	−28.6
Green	Sue Woolmore	429	12.8	−9.0
Liberal Democrats	Alex Martin	317	9.5	N/A
Conservative	Alexander Amos	226	6.8	N/A
Majority		557	16.7	N/A
Turnout		3,353	36.1	+6.2
Registered electors		9,292		
Reform gain from Labour		Swing	▲25.0	

=== Weetslade ===
Weetslade
Party	Candidate	Votes	%	±%
Reform	Richard Ross	1,531	44.2	N/A
Labour	Liz McMullen*	979	28.3	−22.2
Conservative	Matt Johnsson	488	14.1	−13.7
Green	Martin Collins	465	13.4	−8.3
Majority		552	15.9	N/A
Turnout		3,475	44.0	+8.0
Registered electors		7,899		
Reform gain from Labour				

=== Whitley Bay North ===
Whitley Bay North
Party	Candidate	Votes	%	±%
Green	Helen Bell	1,868	39.7	+4.5
Labour	Sandra Graham*	1,586	33.7	−16.0
Reform	Ben Mooney	702	14.9	N/A
Conservative	Dominique Mikula	331	7.0	N/A
Liberal Democrats	David Nisbet	215	4.6	−6.7
Majority		282	6.0	N/A
Turnout		4,716	54.7	+5.5
Registered electors		8,629		
Green gain from Labour		Swing	▲10.3	

== Changes between 2026 and 2027 ==
- 18 August 2026: Rebecca O'Keefe, Labour councillor for Chirton & Percy Main, was suspended by the party for a minimum of six months for voting against the group whip.
- 23 August 2026: Tom Bailey, Labour councillor for Tynemouth, was suspended by the party after allegedly sharing a picture with an imitation firearm. He later resigned with immediate effect from the party, citing big differences in values between himself and the local party.
- 3 September 2026: Josephine Mudzingwa, Labour councillor for North Shields, resigned the Labour whip and began sitting as an independent.
- 5 October 2026: Tom Bailey joined the Green Party. Brian Smith, Reform Leader and councillor for Killingworth, resigned from the party and began sitting as an independent.
