= Executive arrangements =

Types of local governments in England

In England, local authorities are required to adopt one of three types of executive arrangements, having an "elected mayor and cabinet", a "leader and cabinet", or a "committee system". The type of arrangement used determines how decisions will be made within the council. In councils which use the elected mayor system, the mayor is directly elected by the electorate to provide political leadership for the council and has power to make executive decisions. In councils which use the leader and cabinet model (the most commonly used model), the elected councillors choose one of their number to be the leader of the council, and that person provides political leadership and can make executive decisions. Where the committee system is used, executive power is exercised through various committees rather than being focussed on one person. Since the English Devolution and Community Empowerment Act 2026, the "leader and cabinet" model is the only type available to new councils and existing councils can no longer change to any other type.

== Background ==
From the establishment of elected local authorities in England in the nineteenth century until the Local Government Act 2000, councils used a system of committees for decision making. There was no legislative requirement for any councillor to be declared the leader, with the principle being that all the elected councillors were equal in status. In practice, political groups had their own leaders, and when a council was under the control of a particular party, local media would commonly refer to the leader of the controlling party as being the 'leader of the council'. It was also generally recognised that the most powerful political position on a council was the person who chaired the main policy-making committee, which in most councils was called the policy and resources committee. Usually, the leader of the largest party would chair that committee. Some councils explicitly acknowledged the existence of a leader of the council, others did not. The role of leader of the council in that regard was similar to that of the British prime minister; the post had not been explicitly created, but gradually emerged.

== Executive arrangement types ==
The Local Government Act 2000 sought to strengthen public engagement with local democracy, and streamline the system of committees, introducing the models of directly elected mayors and cabinets, leaders and cabinets, as well as a third option for an elected mayor and council manager, which was only adopted by one authority and was later withdrawn. Additionally, lower tier authorities with a population under 85,000 were allowed to continue to use a committee system.

=== Leader and cabinet ===
The leader and cabinet model was introduced under the Local Government Act 2000. It consists of the leader and the cabinet itself, which is usually formed by the majority party in the local authority, where there is one, or by a coalition which comes together to elect a leader. The council elects the leader, and the leader appoints the other members of the cabinet. Each cabinet member holds a separate portfolio, such as housing, finance, economic development, or education. Decisions may be delegated to the individual members, or taken by the cabinet as a whole. These decisions are scrutinised by one or more "overview and scrutiny" committees, which may be dedicated to one or more service areas. The leader and cabinet are responsible for policies, plans, and strategies, which must be within the budget adopted by the full council. These will be reported to the overall "full" council, which is convened to bring together all elected members of the authority at regular meetings. One or more overview and scrutiny committees holds the cabinet to account for its decisions and is responsible that the democratic checks and balances are maintained.

The principal executive decisions taken by the council as a whole are to appoint the leader, to approve the leader's budget, to adopt development plan documents, and to agree on the council's constitution. Beyond that, it may raise issues, urge the leader, cabinet, or cabinet members to take actions, or pass a vote of no confidence in the leader. In addition, the compliance of councillors with their code of conduct may be overseen by a standards committee, although since the coming into effect of the Localism Act 2011 this can be dispensed with and its functions can be delegated to a monitoring officer. Since the English Devolution and Community Empowerment Act 2026 this model of governance is the only arrangement permitted for newly created councils.

=== Elected mayor and cabinet ===
The elected mayor and cabinet model was introduced by the Local Government Act 2000. The English Devolution and Community Empowerment Act 2026 prevents any further local authority directly-elected mayors being created. As of May 2026, 13 councils were operating the directly-elected mayoral model:

Local authority	Post	Type	Current mayor	Party	Established	Next election	Population
Bedford	Mayor of Bedford	Unitary authority	Tom Wootton	Conservative	2002	2027	155,700
Croydon	Mayor of Croydon	London borough	Jason Perry	Conservative	2022	2030	386,710
Doncaster	Mayor of Doncaster	Metropolitan borough	Ros Jones	Labour	2002	2029	291,600
Hackney	Mayor of Hackney	London borough	Zoë Garbett	Green	2002	2030	212,200
Leicester	Mayor of Leicester	Unitary authority	Peter Soulsby	Labour	2011	2027	294,700
Lewisham	Mayor of Lewisham	London borough	Liam Shrivastava	Green	2002	2030	261,600
Mansfield	Mayor of Mansfield	Non-metropolitan district	Andy Abrahams	Labour	2002	2027	100,600
Middlesbrough	Mayor of Middlesbrough	Unitary authority	Chris Cooke	Labour	2002	2027	139,000
Newham	Mayor of Newham	London borough	Forhad Hussain	Labour Co-op	2002	2030	249,500
North Tyneside	Mayor of North Tyneside	Metropolitan borough	Karen Clark	Labour	2002	2029	196,000
Salford	Mayor of Salford	Metropolitan borough	Paul Dennett	Labour	2012	2028	229,000
Tower Hamlets	Mayor of Tower Hamlets	London borough	Lutfur Rahman	Aspire	2010	2030	220,500
Watford	Mayor of Watford	Non-metropolitan district	Peter Taylor	Liberal Democrats	2002	2030	80,000

=== Elected mayor and council manager ===
The elected mayor and council manager option was also introduced by the Local Government Act 2000, but withdrawn by the Local Government and Public Involvement in Health Act 2007. The only local authority to adopt the model was Stoke-on-Trent City Council, reverting to leader and cabinet in 2008.

=== Alternative arrangements ===
Section 31 of the Local Government Act 2000 allowed district councils in two tier areas, with populations under 85,000, to propose alternative executive arrangements. This was superseded by the changes made by the Localism Act 2011 and the renewed availability of the committee system to all local authorities.

=== Committee system ===
Under the Localism Act 2011, principal authorities (such as unitary authorities, county councils, and district councils) were allowed to return to decision-making by committees, the method of local government administration for all councils prior to 2000. Under this model power is exercised, alongside full council, by a number of committees, made up of councillors in proportion to their parties' representation on the council. Such councils may choose to nominate a councillor as leader of the council for the purposes of representing the political leadership of the council, particularly in relations with external bodies. If no leader is nominated, as was the case prior to 2000, the chair of the council's main policy committee may be informally deemed to be the council's de facto leader. As of 2026, around 40 councils use the committee system. The system was abolished by the English Devolution and Community Empowerment Act 2026. Councils already using the system are permitted by a grandfather clause to continue for a period of time. (Note: Councils are required to review executive arrangements ten years after a referendum. or five years after a resolution, to introduce the committee system.)

=== Hybrid arrangements ===
Some councils operate governance arrangements which have the characteristics of more than one formal governance option. This could include an authority operating under leader and cabinet but whose overview and scrutiny committees operate in a manner similar to those under the committee system, developing policy and taking an active part in the decision-making process. A hybrid cabinet-committee model was adopted by Lambeth London Borough Council in June 2026 when the preferred option of the committee system was withdrawn.
