= 2021 North Tyneside mayoral election =

A North Tyneside mayoral election was held in 2021. The Mayor of North Tyneside Norma Redfearn was seeking re-election and won.

== Election result ==
North Tyneside Mayoral Election 6 May 2021
Party	Candidate	1st round		2nd round			1st round votesTransfer votes, 2nd round
Party	Candidate	Total	Of round	Transfers	Total	Of round	1st round votesTransfer votes, 2nd round
Labour	Norma Redfearn	33,119	53.4%				
Conservative	Steven Paul Robinson	19,366	31.2%				
Green	Penny Remfry	4,278	6.9%				
Liberal Democrats	John Christopher Appleby	3,549	5.7%				
UKIP	Jack James Thomson	1,753	2.8%				
