= 2025 North Tyneside mayoral election =

- 1 May 2025
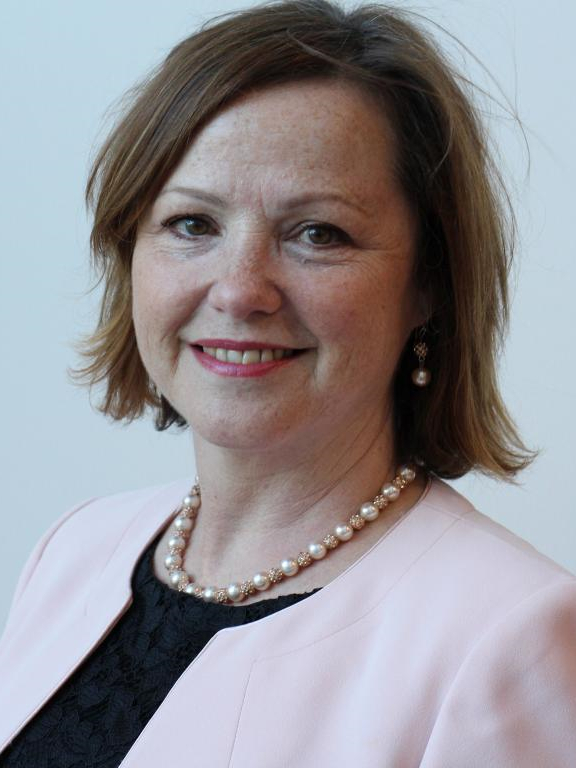
	First party	Second party	Third party
Candidate	Karen Clark	John Falkenstein	Liam Bones
Party	Labour	Reform	Conservative
Last election	53.4%	Did not stand	31.2%
Popular vote	16,230	15,786	11,018
Percentage	30.2%	29.4%	20.5%
Swing	▼23.2 pp	▲29.4 pp	▼10.7 pp
	Fourth party	Fifth party
Candidate	Chloe-Louise Reilly	John Appleby
Party	Green	Liberal Democrats
Last election	6.9%	5.7%
Popular vote	3,980	3,453
Percentage	7.4%	6.4%
Swing	▲0.5 pp	▲0.7 pp
Mayor before election
Norma Redfearn
Labour
Elected mayor
Karen Clark
Labour

The 2025 North Tyneside mayoral election was held on 1 May 2025 to elect the Mayor of North Tyneside. This was the mayoralty's first election since the Elections Act 2022 came into effect, and as such this election used first-past-the-post rather than supplementary vote used in previous elections. The incumbent Labour mayor Norma Redfearn, who had held the post since 2013, was not seeking re-election. Labour candidate Karen Clark was elected.

== Results ==
2025 North Tyneside mayoral election
Party	Candidate	Votes	%	±%
Labour	Karen Anne Clark	16,230	30.2%	−23.2
Reform	John Roy Falkenstein	15,786	29.4%	N/A
Conservative	Liam Adam Bones	11,017	20.5%	−10.7
Green	Chloe-Louise Reilly	3,980	7.4%	+0.5
Liberal Democrats	John Christopher Appleby	3,453	6.4%	+0.7
Independent	Cath Davis	1,780	3.3%	N/A
Independent	Martin Henry Uren	1,460	2.7%	N/A
Majority		444	0.83	
Turnout		53706	33.6	
Labour hold		Swing	-10.05	
