= John Harrison (mayor) =

Former mayor of North Tyneside, England

Cllr John Harrison
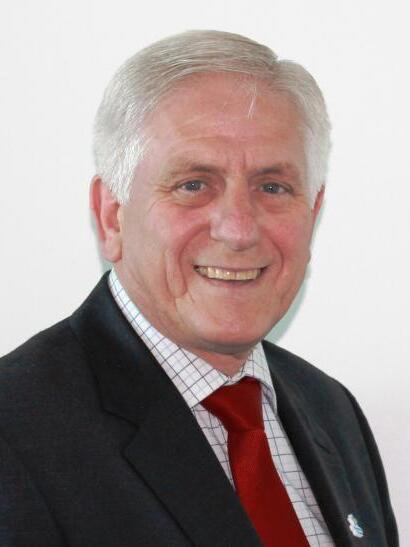
- Official portrait, 2016

North Tyneside Councillor for Howdon ward
- Incumbent
- Assumed office 5 May 2011
- Preceded by: David Charlton

Mayor of North Tyneside
- In office 5 May 2005 – 4 June 2009
- Preceded by: Linda Arkley
- Succeeded by: Linda Arkley

North Tyneside Councillor for Weetslade ward
- In office 6 May 1982 – 5 May 2005
- Succeeded by: Duncan McLellan

Personal details
- Party: Labour

John Harrison is a British Labour Party politician. He was the directly-elected Mayor of North Tyneside in England between 2005 and 2009 and is currently a Councillor on North Tyneside Council.

== Early life ==
Harrison was brought up in Longbenton and started his working life as an apprentice at Parsons, before spending three years in the merchant navy. He returned to shore to work in the rail industry and up to May 2005 was working as a Health and Safety Advisor in local public transport.

== North Tyneside Council ==
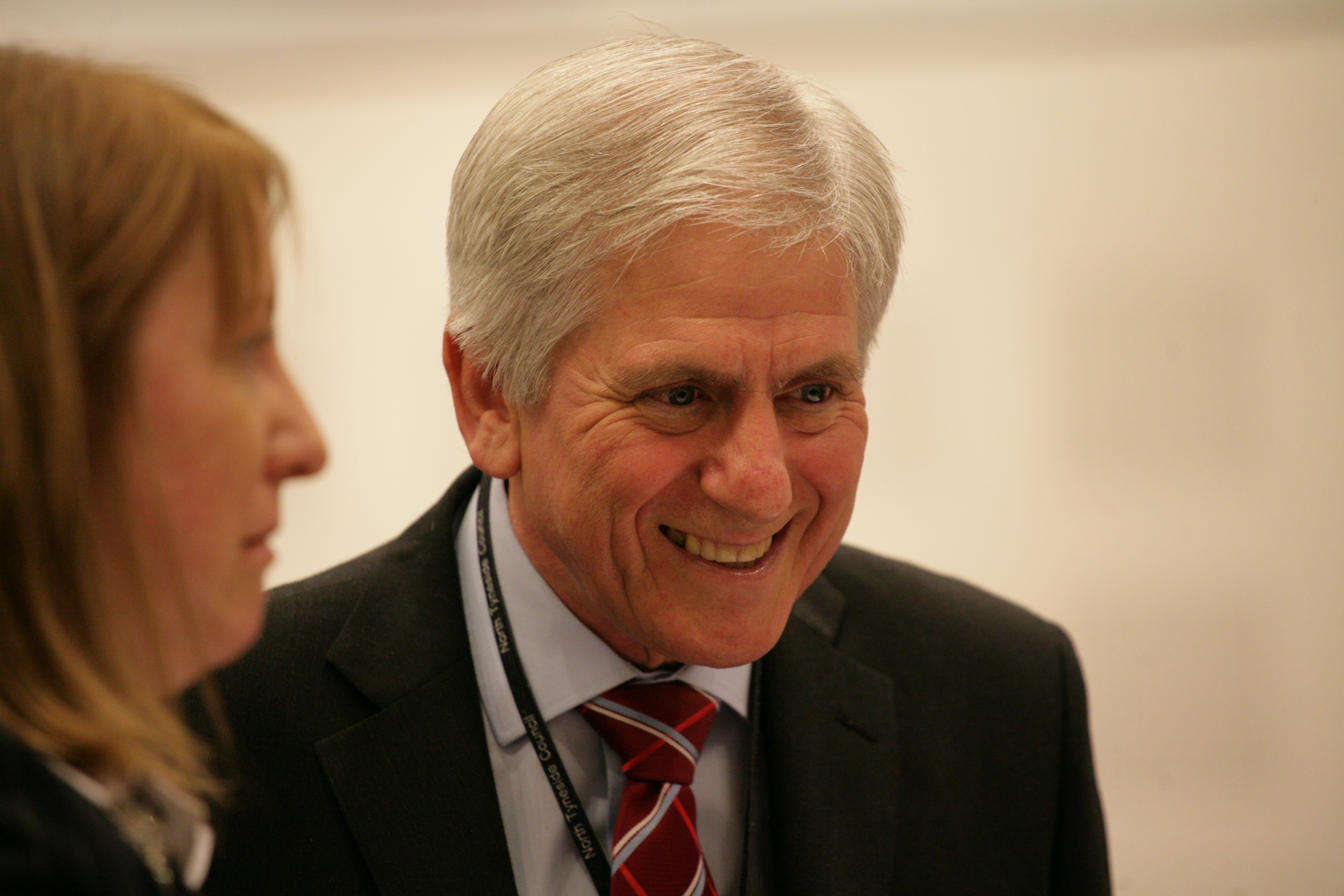
Harrison in 2009

Harrison was first elected to North Tyneside Council in 1982 to the new seat of Weetslade ward. Harrison served as the Councillor for Weetslade on for 21 years before being elected leader of the official opposition and leader of the Labour group in 2003.

He was Leader of the Labour Group of Councillors for two years from 2003-2005. He has also served as Chair of Overview and Scrutiny Committee, Finance Committee, Older Peoples Policy Committee, Area Housing Committee, Budget Monitoring Committee and Safer Communities Committee.

Whilst Chair of the Overview and Scrutiny Committee, Harrison accused the then Conservative Mayor Chris Morgan of deliberately under-funding the scrutiny process saying in North Tyneside, overview has just 'one and a bit' staff, as one officer is on secondment. There are supposed to be four, but the salary is so low no one wants the jobs'.

Harrison was the Labour Party candidate in 2005 North Tyneside Council mayoral election. Harrison would go on to beat the Conservative Party incumbent Linda Arkley by 1,002 votes. Following Harrison's election as Mayor a by-election was held for his vacated seat in Weetslade ward which was won by the Conservative Duncan McLellan.

While Mayor, Harrison was credited with saving the Linskilll Centre in North Shields from closure, launched campaigns to promote local businesses and created North Tyneside's first climate change strategy to cut the boroughs emissions.

In 2007 he put forward a motion to grant Freedom of the Borough of North Tyneside to Wallsend Boys Club.

In the 2009 North Tyneside Mayoral election Harrison sought re-election. His opponent was the former Mayor and the person he had beaten in for the post Linda Arkley. Arkley would go on to defeat Harrison by 4,449 votes.

After being defeated in 2009, Harrison made a return to local politics when he won the Howdon Ward Council seat in the 2011 council elections with an increased majority of 1,447 votes. John was re-elected again in 2015 with a further increased majority of 2,019. He was re-elected once again in 2019 for another four year term. Upon Labour regaining control of North Tyneside Council with the election of Norma Redfearn in 2013, Harrison was invited to serve in the Cabinet which he did until being dismissed in May 2018.

== Personal life ==
Harrison is married and has 3 children and 7 grandchildren. In 2023 He became a great grandfather.In the 2014 Local Elections his daughter, Joanne Cassidy was elected to represent his old seat of Weetslade on North Tyneside Council.

Preceded by Linda Arkley	Mayor of North Tyneside; 2005 – 2009	Succeeded by Linda Arkley
