= Borough Road footbridge =

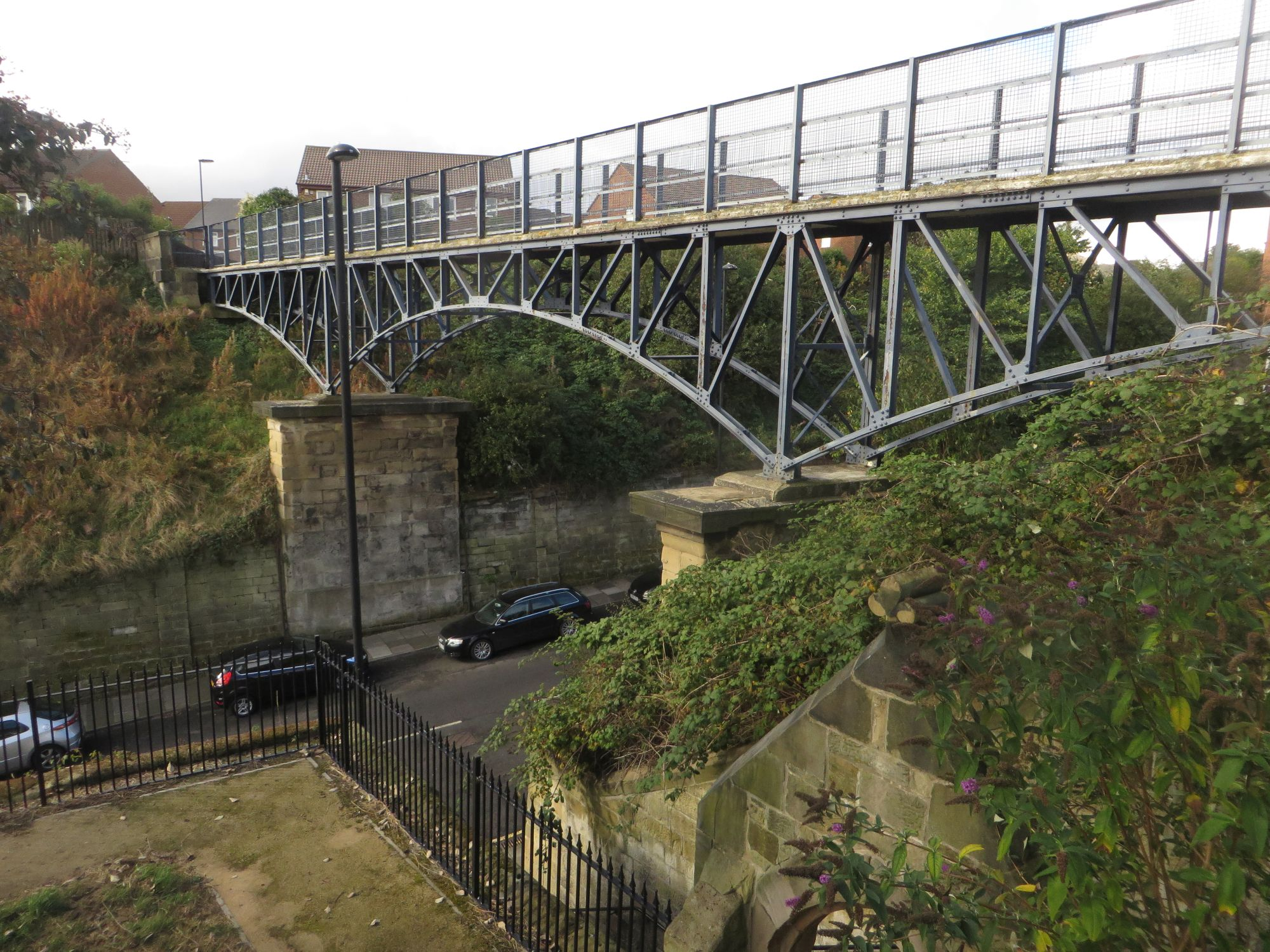
- Coordinates: 55°0′17.45″N 1°26′43.57″W
- Crosses: Borough Road
- Owner: North Tyneside Council

History
- Opened: 1936

Borough Road footbridge is a footbridge in North Shields, England.

The bridge crosses Borough Road and connects Waldo Street and Tennyson Terrace. It carries a public right of way.

== History ==
The bridge was constructed in 1936.

In April 2022, North Tyneside Council approved plans to demolish the bridge, claiming it was in poor condition and nearing the end of its natural lifespan. It estimated restoration of the bridge would cost £360,000 while demolition would cost £63,000 and a replacement would cost £1 million. The council also stated that usage of the bridge had declined and more people cross the street at ground level which had led the council to install a pedestrian crossing parallel to the bridge in 2019. The proposed demolition was met with opposition from local groups.

As the bridge carries a public right-of-way, a government inquiry was launched on 17 January 2023 into whether the right-of-way should be abolished to allow the bridge to be demolished. In May 2023, it was announced that the public right-of-way must be maintained and that the council would not be allowed to remove the bridge.
