= 2019 North Tyneside Metropolitan Borough Council election =

2019 UK local government election

Results of the 2019 North Tyneside Metropolitan Borough Council election

The 2019 North Tyneside Metropolitan Borough Council election took place on 2 May 2019 to elect North Tyneside Metropolitan Borough Council members in England. This took place on the same day as other local elections across the UK including the first of 2019 North of Tyne mayoral election.

All of the seats being contested were last contested in 2015.

== Results summary ==
2019 North Tyneside Metropolitan Borough Council election
| Party | This election | | | Full council | | | This election | | |
| Party | Seats | Net | Seats % | Other | Total | Total % | Votes | Votes % | +/− |
|---|---|---|---|---|---|---|---|---|---|
| Labour | 17 | ▼1 | 85.0 | 35 | 52 | 86.7 | 26,203 | 49.1 | |
| Conservative | 3 | ▲1 | 15.0 | 4 | 7 | 11.7 | 14,484 | 27.1 | |
| UKIP | 0 | Steady | 0.0 | 0 | 0 | 0.0 | 8,923 | 16.7 | |
| Green | 0 | Steady | 0.0 | 0 | 0 | 0.0 | 2,608 | 4.9 | |
| Liberal Democrats | 0 | Steady | 0.0 | 1 | 1 | 1.7 | 889 | 1.7 | |
| Independent | 0 | Steady | 0.0 | 0 | 0 | 0.0 | 296 | 0.6 | |

== Ward results ==
=== Battle Hill ===
Battle Hill
| Party | Candidate | Votes | % | ±% |
|---|---|---|---|---|
| Labour | Julie Cruddas | 1,396 | 58.2 | |
| UKIP | Gary Turnbull | 618 | 25.8 | |
| Conservative | Maureen Jeffrey | 386 | 16.1 | |
| Majority | | | | |
| Turnout | | 2,400 | 30.6 | |
| Labour hold | | Swing | | |

=== Benton ===
Benton
| Party | Candidate | Votes | % | ±% |
|---|---|---|---|---|
| Labour | Janet Hunter | 1,872 | 63.5 | |
| Conservative | David Lilly | 675 | 22.9 | |
| UKIP | Maureen Gallon | 402 | 13.6 | |
| Majority | | | | |
| Turnout | | 2,949 | 38.6 | |
| Labour hold | | Swing | | |

=== Camperdown ===
Camperdown
| Party | Candidate | Votes | % | ±% |
|---|---|---|---|---|
| Labour | Raymond Glindon | 1,281 | 59.5 | |
| UKIP | Ryan Overton | 485 | 22.5 | |
| Conservative | Christopher Fox | 388 | 18.0 | |
| Majority | | | | |
| Turnout | | 2,154 | 27.5 | |
| Labour hold | | Swing | | |

=== Chirton ===
Chirton
| Party | Candidate | Votes | % | ±% |
|---|---|---|---|---|
| Labour | Norman Percy | 1,055 | 51.7 | |
| UKIP | Mick Terril | 688 | 33.7 | |
| Conservative | Stephen Bones | 299 | 14.6 | |
| Majority | | | | |
| Turnout | | 2,042 | 26.7 | |
| Labour hold | | Swing | | |

=== Collingwood ===
Collingwood
| Party | Candidate | Votes | % | ±% |
|---|---|---|---|---|
| Labour | Martin Rankin | 1,138 | 44.8 | |
| Conservative | Robert White | 766 | 30.1 | |
| UKIP | Jane McEachan | 637 | 25.1 | |
| Majority | | | | |
| Turnout | | 2,541 | 30.7 | |
| Labour hold | | Swing | | |

=== Cullercoats ===
Cullercoats
| Party | Candidate | Votes | % | ±% |
|---|---|---|---|---|
| Conservative | Ken Barrie | 1,422 | 42.7 | |
| Labour | Bob Jeffrey | 1,146 | 34.4 | |
| Green | John Morley | 395 | 11.9 | |
| UKIP | Pamela Hood | 366 | 11.0 | |
| Majority | | | | |
| Turnout | | | 45.3 | |
| Conservative gain from Labour | | Swing | | |

=== Howdon ===
Howdon
| Party | Candidate | Votes | % | ±% |
|---|---|---|---|---|
| Labour | John Harrison | 1,266 | 59.6 | |
| UKIP | Neil Mather | 652 | 30.7 | |
| Conservative | Liam Bones | 206 | 9.7 | |
| Majority | | | | |
| Turnout | | 2,124 | 27.6 | |
| Labour hold | | Swing | | |

=== Killingworth ===
Killingworth
| Party | Candidate | Votes | % | ±% |
|---|---|---|---|---|
| Labour | Erin Parker-Leonard | 1,356 | 52.0 | |
| Conservative | Christopher Johnston | 708 | 27.1 | |
| UKIP | Brian Needham | 546 | 20.9 | |
| Majority | | | | |
| Turnout | | 2,610 | 31.8 | |
| Labour hold | | Swing | | |

=== Longbenton ===
Longbenton
| Party | Candidate | Votes | % | ±% |
|---|---|---|---|---|
| Labour | Karen Clark | 1,520 | 66.7 | |
| UKIP | Connor Cervantes | 381 | 16.7 | |
| Conservative | Jack Bell | 379 | 16.6 | |
| Majority | | | | |
| Turnout | | | 28.9 | |
| Labour hold | | Swing | | |

=== Monkseaton North ===
Monkseaton North
| Party | Candidate | Votes | % | ±% |
|---|---|---|---|---|
| Labour | Paul Richardson | 1,398 | 40.9 | |
| Conservative | Lewis Austin | 1,296 | 37.9 | |
| Green | Simon Roffe | 283 | 8.3 | |
| Liberal Democrats | David Nisbet | 252 | 7.4 | |
| UKIP | Stephen Borlos | 191 | 5.6 | |
| Majority | | | | |
| Turnout | | 3,420 | 49.6 | |
| Labour hold | | Swing | | |

=== Monkseaton South ===
Monkseaton South
| Party | Candidate | Votes | % | ±% |
|---|---|---|---|---|
| Labour | David Drummond | 1,469 | 44.1 | |
| Conservative | Frank Austin | 1,052 | 31.6 | |
| Independent | George Partis | 296 | 8.9 | |
| Green | Michael Newton | 267 | 8.0 | |
| UKIP | Jack Cervantes | 244 | 7.3 | |
| Majority | | | | |
| Turnout | | 3,328 | 44.7 | |
| Labour gain from Conservative | | Swing | | |

=== Northumberland ===
Northumberland
| Party | Candidate | Votes | % | ±% |
|---|---|---|---|---|
| Labour | Andrew Newman | 1,062 | 54.6 | |
| UKIP | Fearghall Allonby | 532 | 27.4 | |
| Conservative | David Sarin | 350 | 18.0 | |
| Majority | | | | |
| Turnout | | 1,944 | 28.6 | |
| Labour hold | | Swing | | |

=== Preston ===
Preston
| Party | Candidate | Votes | % | ±% |
|---|---|---|---|---|
| Labour Co-op | Matt Wilson | 1,242 | 49.2 | |
| Conservative | Sue Rodgerson | 872 | 34.5 | |
| UKIP | Sylvia Simpson | 410 | 16.2 | |
| Majority | | | | |
| Turnout | | 2,524 | 39.0 | |
| Labour Co-op hold | | Swing | | |

=== Riverside ===
Riverside
| Party | Candidate | Votes | % | ±% |
|---|---|---|---|---|
| Labour | Wendy Lott | 982 | 47.6 | |
| UKIP | Phyliss Masters | 544 | 26.4 | |
| Green | Nick Martin | 274 | 13.3 | |
| Conservative | Stephen Lowrey | 261 | 12.7 | |
| Majority | | | | |
| Turnout | | 2,061 | 25.9 | |
| Labour hold | | Swing | | |

=== St. Mary's ===
St. Mary's
| Party | Candidate | Votes | % | ±% |
|---|---|---|---|---|
| Conservative | Leslie Miller | 1,774 | 52.0 | |
| Labour | Martin Murphy | 874 | 25.6 | |
| Liberal Democrats | Janet Appleby | 437 | 12.8 | |
| UKIP | William Jackson | 326 | 9.6 | |
| Majority | | | | |
| Turnout | | 3,411 | 49.2 | |
| Conservative hold | | Swing | | |

=== Tynemouth ===
Tynemouth
| Party | Candidate | Votes | % | ±% |
|---|---|---|---|---|
| Conservative | Lewis Bartoli | 1,674 | 43.0 | |
| Labour | Karen Bolger | 1,452 | 37.3 | |
| Green | Alan Steele | 469 | 12.0 | |
| UKIP | Henry Marshall | 301 | 7.7 | |
| Majority | | | | |
| Turnout | | 2,896 | 48.3 | |
| Conservative gain from Labour | | Swing | | |

=== Valley ===
Valley
| Party | Candidate | Votes | % | ±% |
|---|---|---|---|---|
| Labour | Carole Burdis | 1,394 | 54.1 | |
| UKIP | Jim Davey | 478 | 18.6 | |
| Conservative | Miriam Smith | 462 | 17.9 | |
| Green | Steven Leyland | 242 | 9.4 | |
| Majority | | | | |
| Turnout | | 2,576 | 27.8 | |
| Labour hold | | Swing | | |

=== Wallsend ===
Wallsend
| Party | Candidate | Votes | % | ±% |
|---|---|---|---|---|
| Labour | Matthew Thirlaway | 1,195 | 56.1 | |
| UKIP | Tony Kearney | 384 | 18.0 | |
| Conservative | Glynis Barrie | 276 | 13.0 | |
| Green | Martin Collins | 275 | 12.9 | |
| Majority | | | | |
| Turnout | | 2,130 | 28.6 | |
| Labour hold | | Swing | | |

=== Weetslade ===
Weetslade
| Party | Candidate | Votes | % | ±% |
|---|---|---|---|---|
| Labour | Muriel Green | 1,514 | 55.6 | |
| Conservative | Barbara Stevens | 680 | 25.0 | |
| UKIP | Irene Davidson | 527 | 19.4 | |
| Majority | | | | |
| Turnout | | 2,721 | 34.8 | |
| Labour hold | | Swing | | |

=== Whitley Bay ===
Whitley Bay
| Party | Candidate | Votes | % | ±% |
|---|---|---|---|---|
| Labour | John O'Shea | 1,591 | 53.7 | |
| Conservative | Chris Brown | 558 | 18.8 | |
| Green | Sophie Reid-McGlinn | 403 | 13.6 | |
| UKIP | David Cory | 211 | 7.1 | |
| Liberal Democrats | Darryl Roe | 200 | 6.7 | |
| Majority | | | | |
| Turnout | | 2,963 | 42.0 | |
| Labour hold | | Swing | | |
