= Wallsend Town Hall =

Municipal building in Wallsend, Tyne and Wear, England

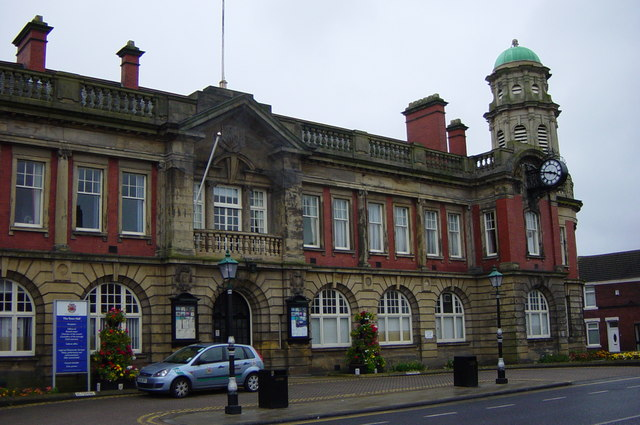
- Wallsend Town Hall

- Shown in Tyne and Wear
- 54.9919°N 1.5266°W
- Location: Wallsend

History
- Built: 1908

Site notes
- Architect(s): E. F. W. Liddle and P. L. Brown
- Architectural style: Edwardian Baroque style

Listed Building – Grade II
- Official name: Town Hall
- Designated: 19 February 1986
- Reference no.: 1025330

Wallsend Town Hall is a municipal building on High Street East in Wallsend, Tyne and Wear, England. The town hall, which was the headquarters of North Tyneside Council from 1974 to 2008, is a Grade II listed building.

== History ==
After Wallsend became incorporated as a municipal borough in 1901, the new civic leaders initially met at the masonic hall in Station Road in Wallsend which had been completed in 1893. After finding this arrangement inadequate, civic leaders decided to procure dedicated municipal buildings: the site they selected was open land on the south side of High Street East.

The foundation stone for the new building was laid by the mayor, William Boyd, in 1907. It was designed by E. F. W. Liddle and P. L. Brown in the Edwardian Baroque style, was built at a cost of £15,557 and was officially opened by Alderman George Allan in September 1908. The design involved an asymmetrical main frontage with nine bays facing onto High Street East with the end bays projected forward as pavilions; the central section, which slightly projected forward, featured a round headed doorway on the ground floor, a balcony and a triple window on the first floor and an open pediment containing the town's coat of arms above. On the right of the symmetrical section there two bays which were set back and another two bays which curved round into Lawson Street. The architect installed a turret and dome above the curved section, and a projecting clock by Potts & Sons, which had been a gift from William Boyd, was installed on the face of the right hand pavilion. Internally, the principal room was the council chamber which incorporated nine stained glass windows each of which depicted two heraldic shields of local relevance.

Queen Elizabeth II, accompanied by the Duke of Edinburgh, visited the town hall and waved to the crowd from the balcony on 29 October 1954.

The town hall continued to serve as the headquarters of Wallsend Borough Council and became the local seat of government of North Tyneside Council in 1974. It continued to be the meeting place of the council until it moved to new premises at Cobalt Business Park in 2008. After carrying out a local consultation in spring 2009, the council established there was widespread support for refurbishing the town hall and finding an alternative use for it. The town hall, which had become surplus to requirements, was sold to a developer, Sovereign Adavo, in 2014 and a programme of works to convert the building for commercial use was completed in February 2015.
