= Linda Arkley =

British politician (1952–2023)

Linda Arkley OBE
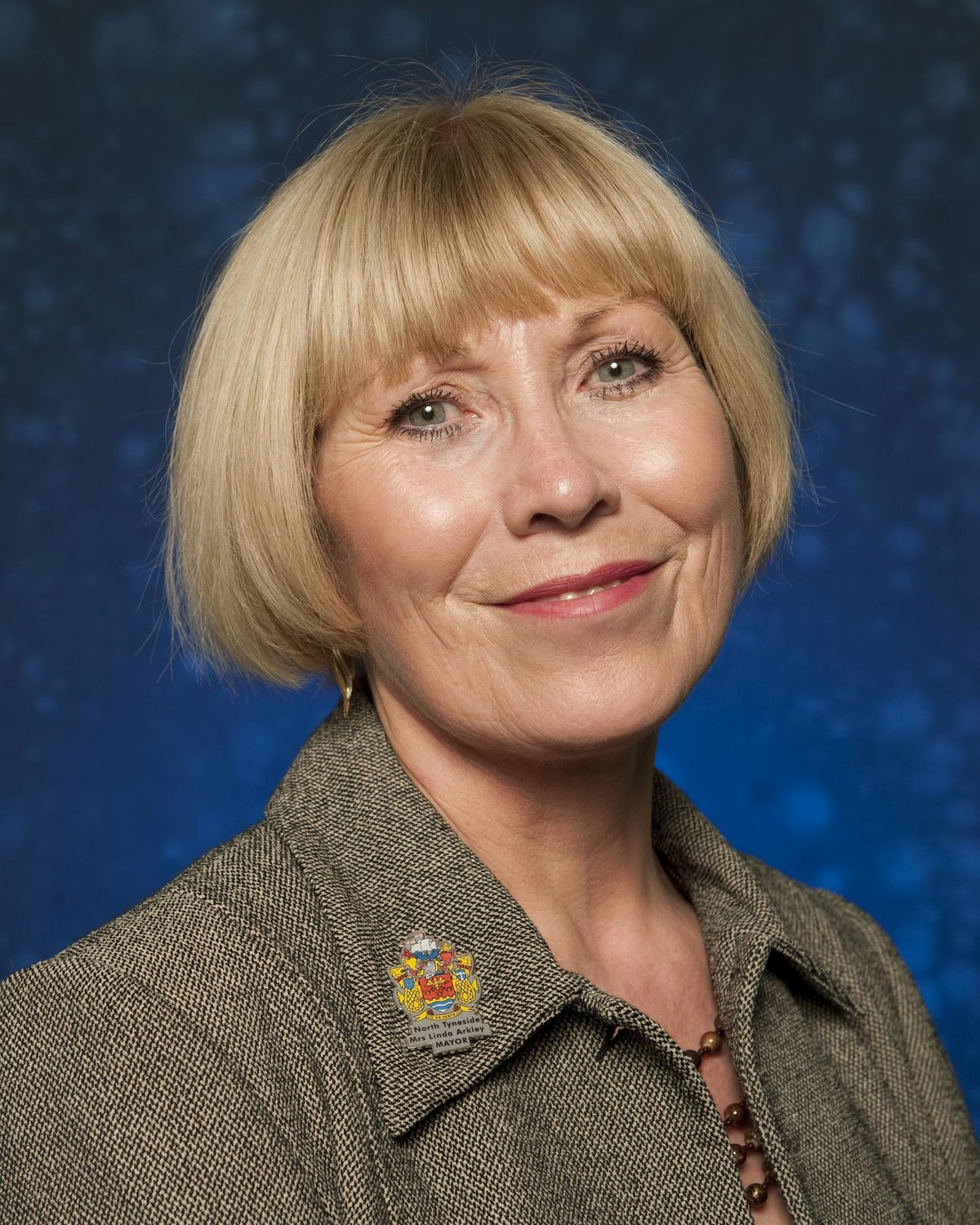
- Official portrait, 2009

Mayor of North Tyneside
- In office 4 June 2009 – 2 May 2013
- Preceded by: John Harrison
- Succeeded by: Norma Redfearn
- In office 12 June 2003 – 5 May 2005
- Preceded by: Chris Morgan
- Succeeded by: John Harrison

North Tyneside Councillor for Cullercoats ward
- In office 6 May 2021 – 13 October 2023
- Preceded by: Karen Lee

North Tyneside Councillor for Preston ward
- In office 6 October 2005 – 4 June 2009
- Preceded by: Martin Van Der Merwe
- Succeeded by: David Sarin

North Tyneside Councillor for Tynemouth ward
- In office 2 May 1996 – 12 June 2003
- In office 2 May 1991 – 4 May 1995

Personal details
- Born: February 1952 Jarrow, County Durham
- Died: 13 October 2023 (aged 71) Newcastle-Upon-Tyne, Tyne & Wear
- Party: Conservative

Linda Arkley OBE (February 1952 – 13 October 2023) was a British Conservative politician who served as the elected mayor of North Tyneside from 2003 to 2005 and from 2009 to 2013.

== Early life ==
Linda Arkley was born in February 1952. She attended The Bede School in Sunderland, and studied at both Sunderland University and Northumbria University. For most of Arkley's professional career she worked as a nurse and health visitor.

== Political career ==
Arkley was first elected as a councillor for Tynemouth ward in 1991, a seat she held until 1995 before regaining it in 1996. During this time she served as deputy leader of the Conservative group on North Tyneside council and in cabinet under Conservative Mayor, Chris Morgan.

The Conservative Mayor of North Tyneside, Chris Morgan, resigned in 2003 due to a scandal involving child pornography. Arkley stood in the subsequent by-election, and won in the second round defeating then MEP Gordon Adam.

Arkley was defeated in 2005 by Labour candidate John Harrison.

Later that year she stood in a council by-election in 2005, and was elected to represent Preston ward.

Arkley regained the mayoralty of North Tyneside in 2009, when she defeated Harrison. Towards the end of Arkley's second term she was expelled from a meeting of North Tyneside Council after she “berated” Labour councillor Sandra Graham after she asked questions about workers’ rights and the safeguarding of external funding.

In May 2013 she was defeated by the Labour candidate Norma Redfearn.

Arkley stood as the Conservative candidate for Tynemouth ward in 2014, when she was defeated by the Labour incumbent, Sarah Day. In the 2015 local elections, Linda Arkley again unsuccessfully attempted to return to North Tyneside Council by standing in Benton ward where she lost to Labour's Janet Hunter.

In March 2019, Linda Arkley announced her intention to seek the Conservative nomination in the inaugural North of Tyne Mayoral election, noting that she was the only declared female candidate for the office. Having chosen the International Women's Day to announce her decision, she told ChronicleLife that her candidacy had been inspired by "making sure this isn't a male dominated race." Arkley would go on to lose the nomination to local businessman Charlie Hoult.

Arkley made her return to North Tyneside Council in 2021, taking the seat of Cullercoats ward from the Labour Party in that year's local elections.

Linda Arkley died on 13 October 2023, at the age of 71.

== Honours ==
Arkley was made an Order of the British Empire in 2018 for political service.

Civic offices
| Preceded by Chris Morgan | Mayor of North Tyneside; 2003–2005 | Succeeded by John Harrison |
| Preceded by John Harrison | Mayor of North Tyneside; 2009–2013 | Succeeded by Norma Redfearn |
