= Karen Clark (British politician) =

Mayor of North Tyneside, England

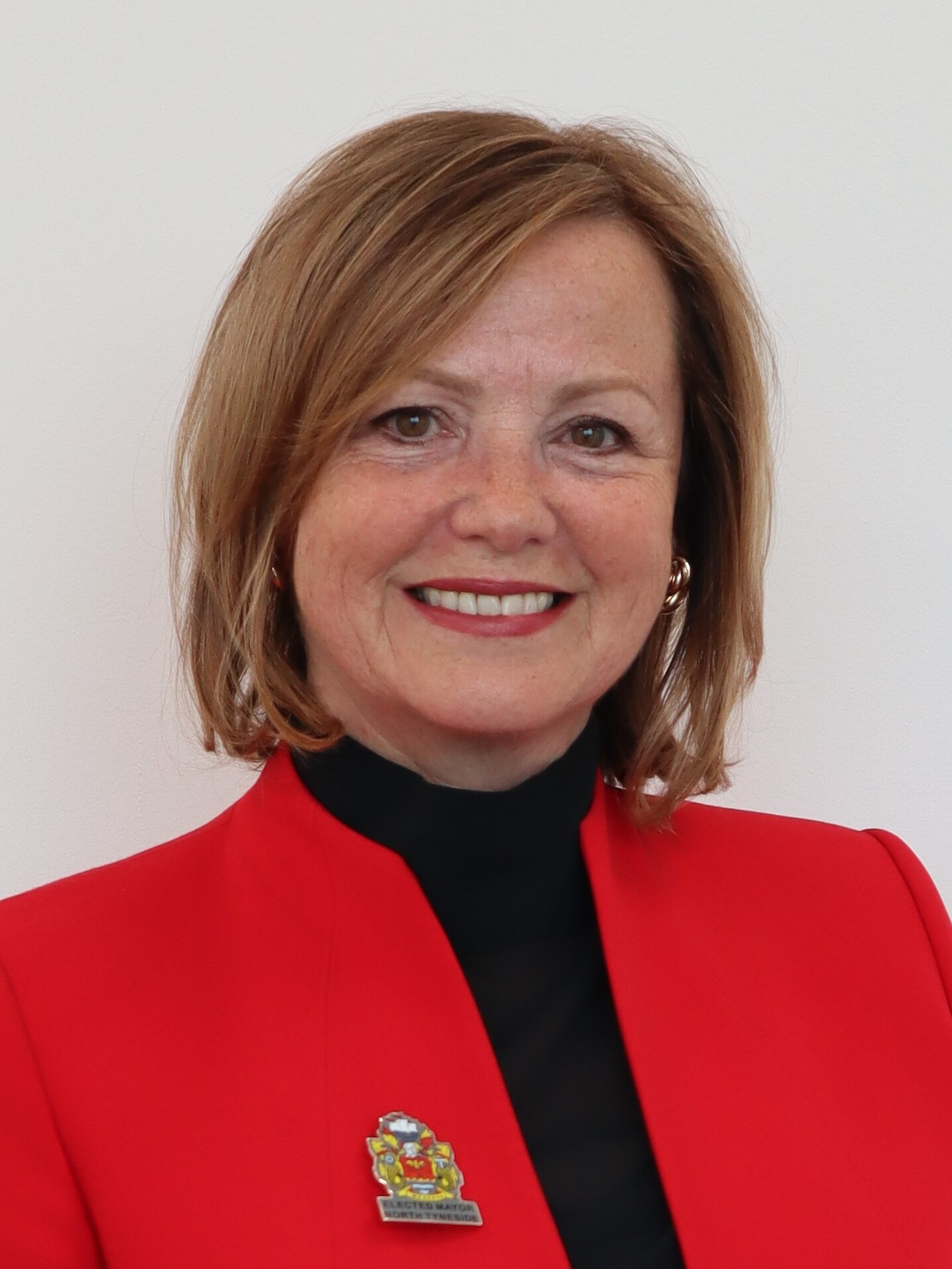
- Official portrait, 2025

Mayor of North Tyneside
- Incumbent
- Assumed office 5 May 2025
- Deputy: Carl Johnson
- Preceded by: Norma Redfearn
- Majority: 444 (0.8%)

Deputy Mayor of the North East
- Incumbent
- Assumed office June 2026
- Preceded by: Martin Gannon

Member of North Tyneside Council for Longbenton and Benton Longbenton (2015–2024)
- In office 7 May 2015 – 5 May 2025
- Preceded by: Kevin Conroy

North Tyneside Cabinet Member for Public Health and Wellbeing
- In office 11 May 2021 – 5 May 2025
- Mayor: Norma Redfearn
- Succeeded by: Joan Walker

Personal details
- Born: Karen Anne Clark North Tyneside, Tyne and Wear, England
- Party: Labour
- Education: Northumbria University

Karen Anne Clark is a British politician who has served as the mayor of North Tyneside since 2025. A member of the Labour Party, she served as a member of North Tyneside Council for the ward of Longbenton and Benton (formerly Longbenton) from 2015 to 2025. From 2021 to 2025, she served under former mayor Norma Redfearn as her cabinet member for public health and wellbeing.

== Early life and career ==
Karen Anne Clark was born and raised in North Tyneside. She has two siblings, her brother Tom and her sister Julie. They grew up in a deprived area of the borough where they lived in poverty. Clark attended Northumbria University, where she studied social research and sociology.

In 2007, Clark and her sister Julie founded Justice Prince Community Interest Company, a volunteering organisation which aims to tackle social and regional economic inequality in the North East of England. She is also a former teacher and youth worker.

== Political career ==
In the 2015 North Tyneside Council election, Clark was elected to serve as the Labour councillor for the Longbenton ward. She was re-elected in the 2019 and 2023 council elections. In the 2024 North Tyneside Council election, she was elected to represent the reorganised Longbenton and Benton ward.

In 2021, Clark was appointed to the cabinet of North Tyneside mayor Norma Redfearn as the cabinet member for public health and wellbeing. In 2024, Clark was selected as Labour's candidate in the 2025 North Tyneside mayoral election after Norma Redfearn, the outgoing Labour mayor, endorsed her for the role.

In her mayoral campaign, Clark campaigned on economic investment, employment and continuity with Redfearn's administration. In an interview with the BBC, she said she would focus on introducing "good quality jobs", attracting additional government funding for North Tyneside and cooperating with local businesses to attract economic growth.

On 2 May 2025, Clark was elected as the new mayor of North Tyneside with 16,230 votes, or 30.2% of the vote, with a majority of 444. In her victory speech, she thanked her supporters and said she would work to make "North Tyneside an even better place to live, work and visit". She pledged to focus on attracting new jobs, building more affordable social housing and improving opportunities for young people. After her election as mayor, Clark stood down from her position as a councillor for Longbenton and Benton, triggering a by-election for that ward.
