= Chris Morgan (politician) =

British politician

Mayor of North Tyneside Council
- In office 6 May 2002 – 18 April 2003
- Preceded by: position created
- Succeeded by: Linda Arkley

North Tyneside Councillor for St Mary's ward
- In office 2 May 1996 – 2 May 2002

Personal details
- Party: Conservative

Chris Morgan was a British Conservative Party politician. He served as Mayor of North Tyneside, England, from his election in May 2002 until he resigned in April 2003.

== Early life ==
Morgan was born in Wallsend, he was educated at Whitley Bay High School and studied at the University of Wales.

Morgan spent his early career in accountancy with PriceWaterhouse Coopers, followed by a spell as finance director of an IT firm.

== North Tyneside Council ==
Morgan was first elected to North Tyneside Council in 1996 as the Councillor for St Mary's ward. Morgan would hold the seat until his election as Mayor. During this time Morgan was made the Conservative opposition spokesperson for Finance,

Following the passage of the Local Government Act 2000, a referendum was held in North Tyneside on whether to introduce a directly elected mayor. The referendum was held on 18 October 2001 and voters approved the creation of the post by a margin of 58% to 42%. In the election that followed Morgan was the Conservative Party candidate and would go on to beat his Labour opponent and Deputy Leader of the council, Eddie Darke. Morgan's victory ended Labour's nearly thirty year control of North Tyneside Council.

In March 2003, Morgan was arrested over the alleged indecent assault of a 15-year-old girl. On 17 April 2003 Morgan was again arrested, this time on charges related to child pornography. The following day Morgan resigned as Mayor of North Tyneside saying he wanted to fight full time to clear his name over the child pornography and indecent assault allegations against him. The Deputy Mayor, Cllr Lawrence Goveas took on the mayor's responsibilities until a by-election was held to replace Morgan.

He was later brought to trial on the child pornography charges. The jury at Kingston upon Hull Crown Court found him not guilty of all charges in September 2004.

The by-election that was held to replace Morgan was won by the Conservative Party candidate Linda Arkley. Arkley had served in Morgan's cabinet as the member for health and social services.

== After North Tyneside Council ==
In October 2004, after being cleared of all charges, Morgan expressed a desire to return to front-line politics one day, yet said he would concentrate on rebuilding his career first. Morgan became active in party politics again in 2005 as the campaign manager for both Linda Arkley and the Conservative candidate for Tynemouth constituency in the 2005 General election. During this time the Labour Party alleged that Morgan was still 'pulling the strings' on Arkley's proposed budget.

He was later convicted of sharing indecent images of children in 2019.

Civic offices
New office	Mayor of North Tyneside; 2002–2003	Succeeded by Linda Arkley
