= North Tyneside Council =

Local government body in England

Type
- Type: Metropolitan borough council

History
- Founded: 1 April 1974

Leadership
- Chair: Wendy Lott, Labour since 21 May 2026
- Mayor: Karen Clark, Labour since 5 May 2025
- Chief Executive: Jacqueline Laughton since 6 January 2025

Structure
- Seats: Elected mayor plus 60 councillors
- Graph of the party split among 61 seats.
- Political groups: Administration (37) Labour (36+1) Other parties (24) Reform (10) Conservative (8) Green (3) Independent (3)
- Joint committees: North East Combined Authority

Elections
- Voting system: First-past-the-post
- Last election: May 2026
- Next election: May 2027

Meeting place
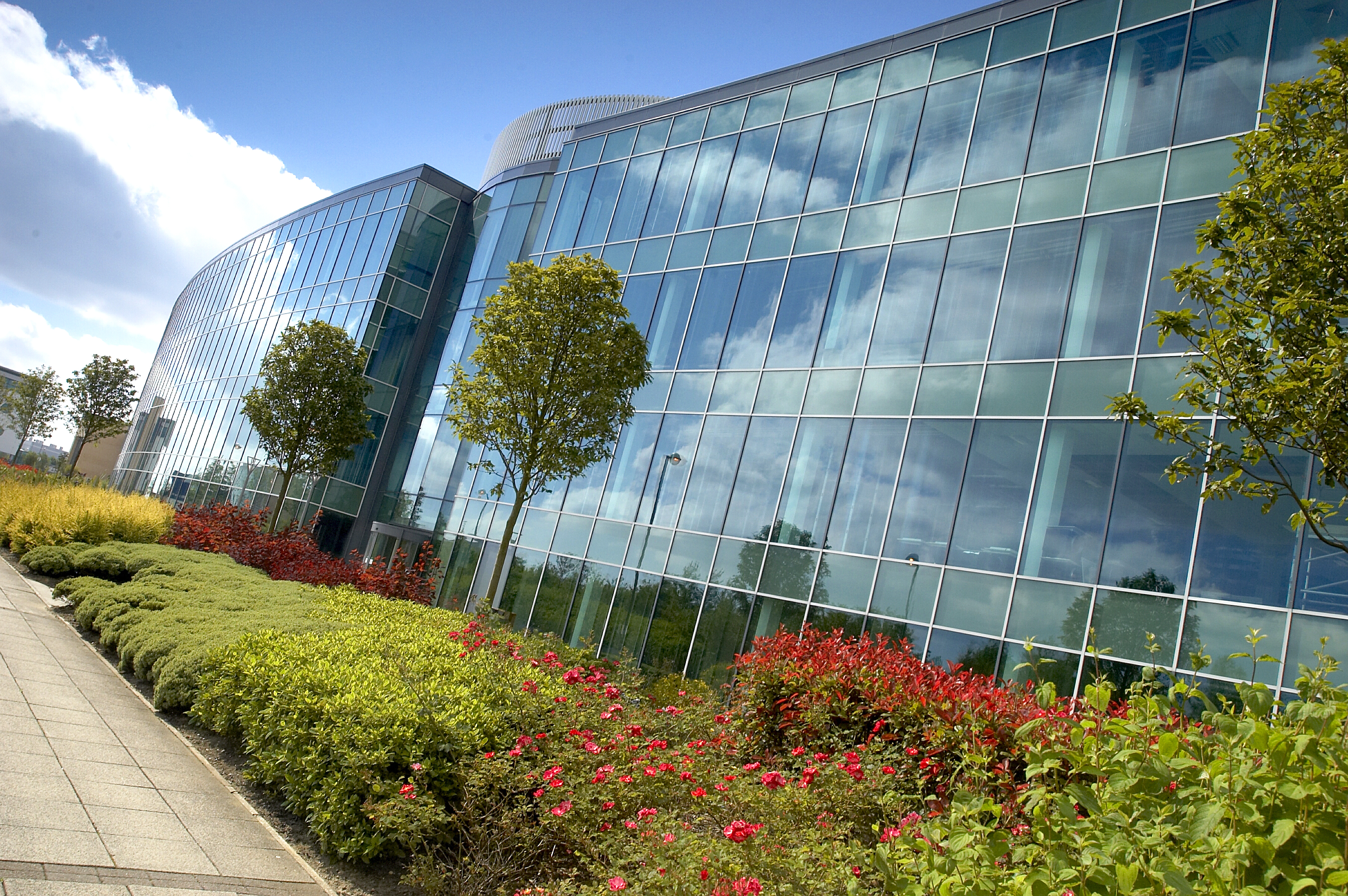
- Quadrant East, 16 The Silverlink North, Newcastle upon Tyne, NE27 0BY

Website
- my.northtyneside.gov.uk

North Tyneside Council, or North Tyneside Metropolitan Borough Council, is the local authority for the metropolitan borough of North Tyneside in Tyne and Wear, England. It is a metropolitan borough council and provides the majority of local government services in the borough. The council has been a member of the North East Combined Authority since 2024.

The council has been under Labour majority control since 2011. As at October 2026, three other parties have recognised political groups on the council (Reform, Conservative, Green), with the largest, Reform, the recognised opposition group.

The council is based at Quadrant East in Cobalt Park, a large business park in the centre of the borough.

== History ==
North Tyneside and its council were created in 1974 under the Local Government Act 1972 as one of five districts within the new metropolitan county of Tyne and Wear. The district covered the whole area of three former districts and parts of another two, which were all abolished at the same time:

- Longbenton Urban District
- Seaton Valley Urban District (Backworth, Earsdon and Shiremoor wards only, rest went to Blyth Valley)
- Tynemouth County Borough (which included North Shields)
- Wallsend Municipal Borough
- Whitley Bay Municipal Borough (all except the Hartley and Seaton Sluice area, which went to Blyth Valley)

The whole area had been in Northumberland prior to the reforms; as a county borough, Tynemouth had been independent from Northumberland County Council but had been part of Northumberland for ceremonial purposes. The new district was granted borough status from its creation, allowing it to appoint a mayor.

North Tyneside Council initially provided district-level functions, with county-level functions being provided by Tyne and Wear County Council. The county council was abolished in 1986, after only twelve years in existence, and its functions passed to the area's five district councils.

In 2002 the council changed to having a directly elected mayor; prior to that the mayor had been a more ceremonial position.

== Governance ==
Since 1986 the council has provided both district-level and county-level functions, with some services being provided through joint arrangements with the other Tyne and Wear councils. In 2024 a combined authority was established covering North Tyneside, County Durham, Gateshead, Newcastle upon Tyne, Northumberland, South Tyneside and Sunderland, called the North East Mayoral Combined Authority. It is chaired by the directly elected Mayor of the North East and oversees the delivery of certain strategic functions across the area.

=== Political control ===
The council has been under Labour majority control since 2011.

The first election to the council was held in 1973, initially operating as a shadow authority alongside the outgoing authorities until it came into its powers on 1 April 1974. Political control of the council since 1974 has been as follows:

Party in control	Years
Labour	1974–1986
No overall control	1986–1987
Labour	1987–2004
No overall control	2004–2008
Conservative	2008–2010
No overall control	2010–2011
Labour	2011–present

=== Leadership ===
Prior to 2002, political leadership was provided by the leader of the council. In 2002 the council changed to having a directly elected mayor. There have been periods where the mayor is of one party but the majority of the councillors are of another party.

The leaders from 1974 to 2002 were:

Councillor	Party	From	To
Jim Bamborough	Labour	1974	18 May 1984
Brian Flood	Labour	18 May 1984	May 1996
Rita Stringfellow	Labour	May 1996	5 May 2002

The mayors since 2002 have been: (Note: Mayoral terms of office run from the fourth day after polling day.)

Mayor	Party	From	To
Chris Morgan	Conservative	6 May 2002	18 Apr 2003
Linda Arkley	Conservative	12 Jun 2003	8 May 2005
John Harrison	Labour	9 May 2005	7 Jun 2009
Linda Arkley	Conservative	8 Jun 2009	5 May 2013
Norma Redfearn	Labour	6 May 2013	4 May 2025
Karen Clark	Labour	5 May 2025	

=== Composition ===
Following the 2026 election, and subsequent changes of allegiance up to 8 October 2026, the composition of the council (excluding the elected mayor's Labour seat) was:

Party	Seats
Labour	36
Reform	10
Conservative	8
Green	3
Independent	3
Total	60

Several councillors have changed allegiance since the May 2026 election. Tom Bailey (Tynemouth) moved from Labour to Independent in September 2026, subsequently to the Green Party in October 2026. Josephine Mudzingwa (North Shields) moved from Labour to Independent in September 2026. Both cited disagreements with the rest of the Labour group, including on response to the 2026 nurdles spill, and both had faced deselection or suspension. Brian Smith (Reform) moved to Independent in October 2026. Until his resignation, Smith was the leader of the council's Reform group, the official opposition since the 2026 election.

The next election is due in May 2027.

== Elections ==
Since the last boundary changes in 2024 the council has comprised 60 councillors representing 20 wards, with each ward electing three councillors. Elections are held three years out of every four, with a third of the council (one councillor for each ward) elected each time for a four-year term of office.

== Premises ==
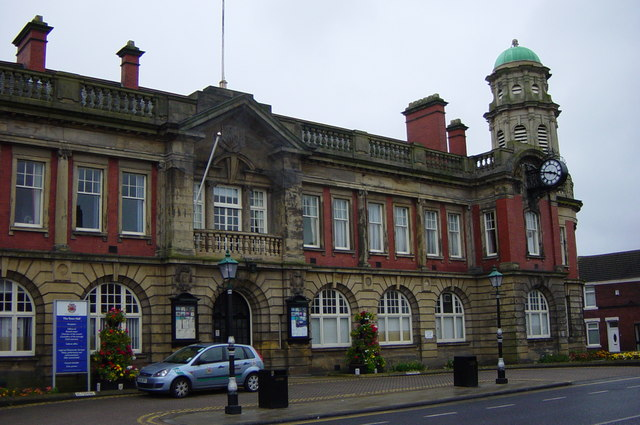
Wallsend Town Hall: Council's meeting place 1974–2008

Since 2008 the council has been based at Quadrant East, a modern office building at Cobalt Park, a large business park in the centre of the borough. The building is in the part of the borough which was the County Borough of Tynemouth prior to 1974.

Prior to 2008 the council's offices were in several locations across the borough. Meetings were held at Wallsend Town Hall.
