= Norma Redfearn =

British politician (born 1938)

Dame Norma Redfearn DBE
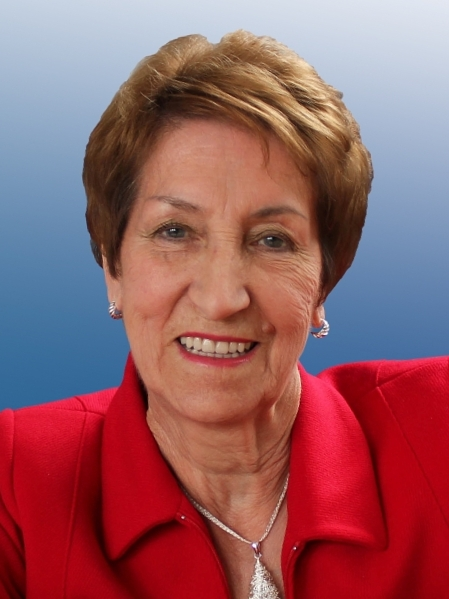
- Official portrait, 2013

Mayor of North Tyneside
- In office 6 May 2013 – 5 May 2025
- Preceded by: Linda Arkley
- Succeeded by: Karen Clark

Mayor of the North of Tyne
- Interim
- In office 4 December 2018 – 2 May 2019
- Preceded by: Office established
- Succeeded by: Jamie Driscoll

Member of North Tyneside Council for Riverside
- In office 10 June 2004 – 2 May 2013
- Preceded by: John Lowther
- Succeeded by: Wendy Lott

Personal details
- Born: February 1938 (age 88) Wallsend, England
- Party: Labour
- Education: Newcastle University (BPhil)

Dame Norma Redfearn DBE (born February 1938) is a British Labour Party politician who served as Mayor of North Tyneside from 2013 to 2025.

== Early life and career ==
Redfearn was born in Wallsend. The daughter of a shipyard worker, she graduated with a BPhil from Newcastle University.

Redfearn had a 30-year career in primary and secondary education. After a variety of teaching jobs, she left Wharrier Street Juniors in June 1986, where she was deputy head, to head West Walker Primary School, east of Newcastle upon Tyne. She stayed there until July 2000. In June 1989 the school won an award from the Royal Institute of British Architects for its playground design, presented to Redfearn and a pupil by Charles III. then the Prince of Wales. In 1997, she became the first headteacher to receive the prize for Public Management Leadership from the Office for Public Management.

== North Tyneside Council ==
Redfearn was elected to North Tyneside Council as a councillor for Riverside ward in 2004 where she served until her election as mayor. After the election of John Harrison as the Mayor of North Tyneside in 2005, Redfearn served as the Cabinet Member for Children and Young People on North Tyneside Council. She held the position until 2009 when Harrison lost his re-election campaign. During her time as Cabinet Member for Children and Young People she is credited with introducing breakfast clubs for children across the borough.

Following Harrison's defeat to Conservative Linda Arkley, Redfearn sought the nomination to become Labour's candidate for Mayor. In February 2012 she was formally selected as Labour's candidate for Mayor, defeating former Mayor Cllr John Harrison, former Deputy Mayor and then Leader of North Tyneside Labour Group Cllr Jim Allan, Cllr Ian Grayson, and Cllr Lesley Spillard. Redfearn would go on to defeat the Conservative incumbent Linda Arkley.

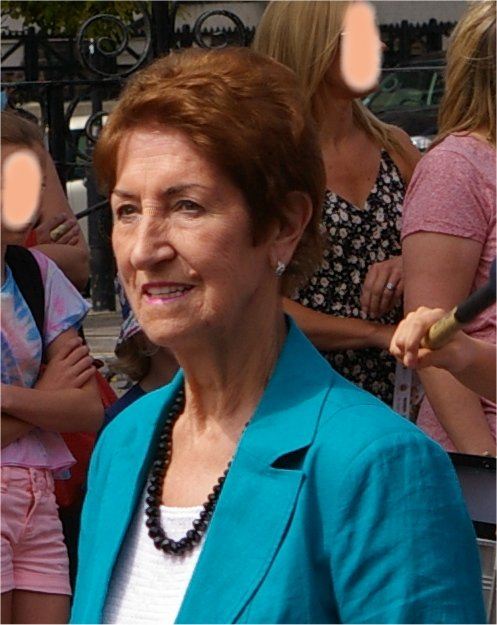
Redfearn in 2014

She was first elected as Mayor of North Tyneside on 2 May 2013, winning 55.35% of the votes cast on a turnout of 32.07% and re-elected again on 4 May 2017, defeating the Conservative candidate, Stewart Hay, with an increased majority. She was re-elected for a third term on 6 May 2021.

In May 2018, Redfearn reshuffled her cabinet dismissing the former Mayor Harrison, among others, and bringing in new members including councillors Carl Johnson, Sarah Day, Steve Cox and Peter Earley. She made no changes to her Cabinet in 2019 or 2020.

In 2020, Redfearn publicly announced that she would be seeking a historic third term as Elected Mayor of North Tyneside. Redfearn stated that she counts the multi-million pound regeneration of Whitley Bay and The Spanish City as one of the things she has been proudest of during her second term in office. During Redfearn's second term, children's services in North Tyneside were rated 'outstanding' by Ofsted, the Council declared a Climate Emergency, and Forest Hall town centre receive major investment. As of 2017, Redfearn lives in North Shields.

Already Commander of the Order of the British Empire (CBE), Redfearn was appointed Dame Commander of the Order of the British Empire (DBE) in the 2023 New Year Honours for political and public service.

In May 2024 Redfearn announced she would not be seeking a fourth term as Mayor, she subsequently left the office in May 2025. She was awarded the Freedom of the Borough of North Tyneside on 9 February 2026.

== North of Tyne Combined Authority ==
Redfearn was an ardent supporter of regional devolution and was one of the leading voices behind the creation of the North of Tyne Combined Authority. As a result, she was appointed Interim Mayor of the North of Tyne until an election took place, a role she held simultaneously with her post as Elected Mayor of North Tyneside. Following the 2019 North of Tyne mayoral election, Redfearn was appointed Deputy Mayor of North of the Tyne and the Cabinet member for Housing and Land by new North of Tyne Mayor Jamie Driscoll.
