= Mayor of North Tyneside =

Political position

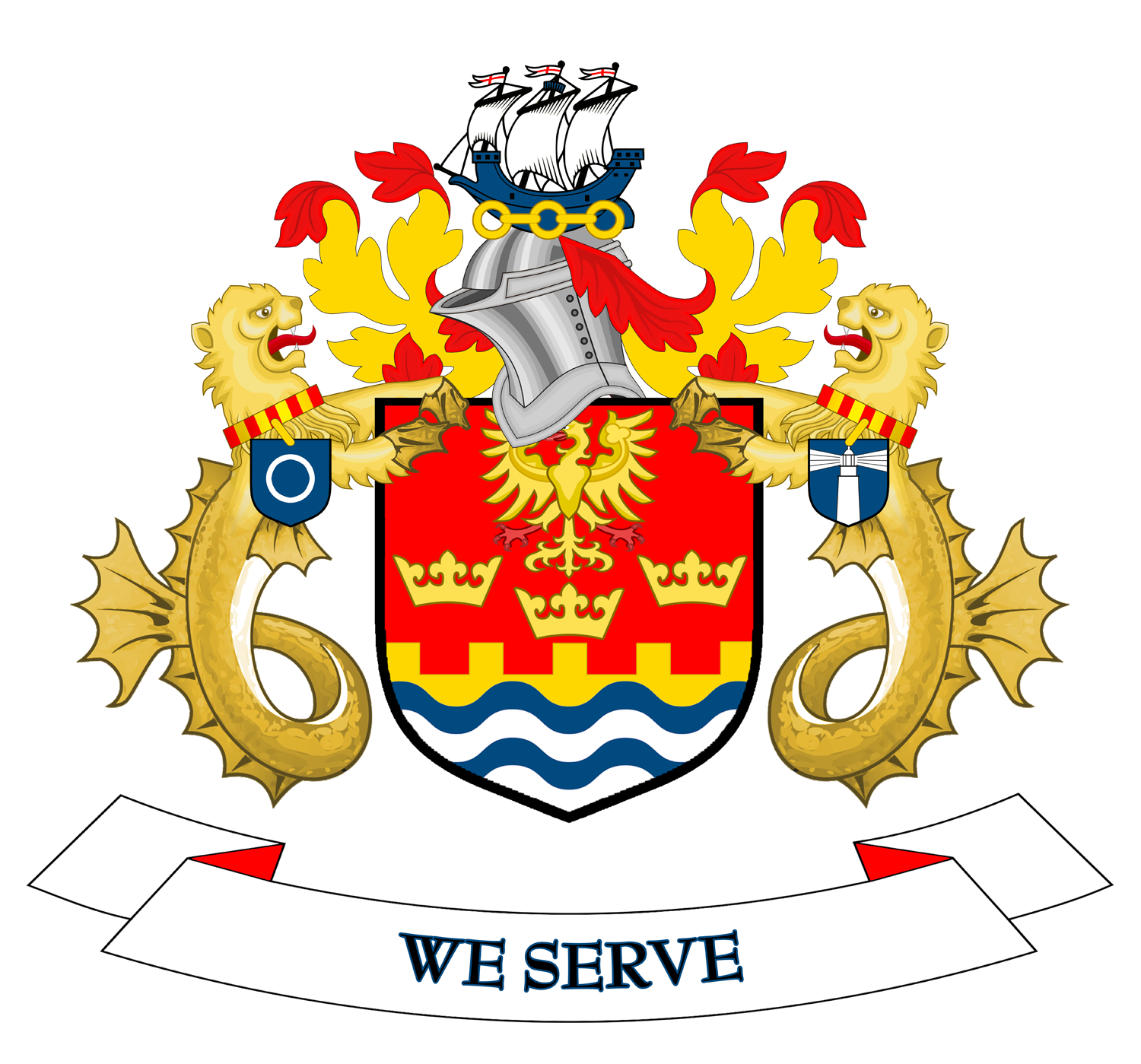
- Coat of arms of the Metropolitan Borough of North Tyneside

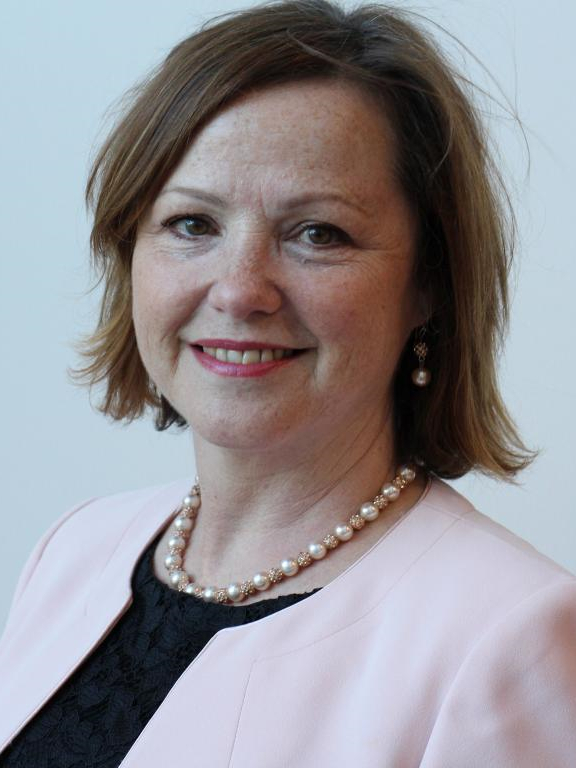
- Incumbent; Karen Clark since 5 May 2025
- Style: No courtesy title or style
- Appointer: Electorate of North Tyneside
- Term length: Four years

The mayor of North Tyneside is the directly elected local authority mayor (executive mayor) of the borough of North Tyneside in Tyne and Wear, England, providing political leadership for North Tyneside Council. The incumbent since 2025 is Karen Clark. A referendum was held on 5 May 2016 to determine if residents wished to retain the mayoral system or change to a committee system. The number of votes for continuing with the mayoral system was 32,546 (57.5%) against 23,703 (41.8%) for a committee system.

Elections up to 2021 were held under the supplementary vote electoral system, and future elections will again use this system. The 2025 election used the first-past-the-post system, after the Elections Act 2022 changed the electoral system for mayoral elections. This was changed back in 2026 following the English Devolution and Community Empowerment Act 2026.

== Referendum ==
Mayor of North Tyneside referendum 18 October 2001
Choice	Votes	%
Elected Mayor	30,262	57.58
Cabinet System	22,296	42.42
Required majority		50
Total	52,558	100.00
Registered voters/turnout		36.2
Source: House of Commons Library

Referendum on how North Tyneside is governed 6 May 2016
Choice	Votes	%
Elected Mayor	32,546	57.50
Committee System	24,059	42.50
Required majority		50
Total	56,605	100.00

== Election results ==
=== 2002 ===
Mayor of North Tyneside election 2 May 2002
Party	Candidate	1st round		2nd round			1st round votesTransfer votes, 2nd round
Party	Candidate	Total	Of round	Transfers	Total	Of round	1st round votesTransfer votes, 2nd round
Conservative	Christopher Morgan	21,829	35.9%	4,254	26,083	51.5%	
Labour	Eddie Darke	19,601	32.2%	4,930	24,531	48.5%	
Liberal Democrats	Michael Huscroft	12,323	20.2%				
Independent	Allan Pond	4,993	8.2%				
Socialist Alliance	Michael Elliott	2,119	3.5%				
Conservative win							

=== 2003 by-election ===
A mayoral by-election was held on 12 June 2003, which was won by Linda Arkley of the Conservative Party, after Chris Morgan resigned after he was arrested in relation to police investigations over allegations of possessing indecent images of children. He was cleared of all charges the following year, but was convicted of similar offences in 2019.

Mayor of North Tyneside by-election 12 June 2003
Party	Candidate	1st round		2nd round			1st round votesTransfer votes, 2nd round
Party	Candidate	Total	Of round	Transfers	Total	Of round	1st round votesTransfer votes, 2nd round
Conservative	Linda Arkley	18,478	43.1%	2,750	21,228	56.4%	
Labour	Gordon Adam	13,070	30.5%	3,357	16,427	43.6%	
Liberal Democrats	Michael Huscroft	8,404	19.8%				
BNP	Robert Batten	2,554	6.0%				
Socialist Alliance	Louise van der Hoeven	400	0.9%				
Majority					4,801		
Conservative hold							

=== 2005 ===
Mayor of North Tyneside election 5 May 2005
Party	Candidate	1st round		2nd round			1st round votesTransfer votes, 2nd round
Party	Candidate	Total	Of round	Transfers	Total	Of round	1st round votesTransfer votes, 2nd round
Labour	John Harrison	34,053	40%	6,407	40,460	50.6%	
Conservative	Linda Arkley	35,467	42%	3,991	39,458	49.4%	
Liberal Democrats	Joan Harvey	12,761	15%				
National Front	Robert Batten	2,470	3%				
Majority					1,002		
Labour gain from Conservative							

=== 2009 ===
Mayor of North Tyneside election 4 June 2009
Party	Candidate	1st round		2nd round			1st round votesTransfer votes, 2nd round
Party	Candidate	Total	Of round	Transfers	Total	Of round	1st round votesTransfer votes, 2nd round
Conservative	Linda Arkley	24,784	45%	2,299	27,083	54.5%	
Labour	John Harrison	19,823	34%	2,811	22,634	45.5%	
Liberal Democrats	Nigel Huscroft	7,343	13%				
BNP	John Burrows	3,398	6%				
Green	Martin Collins	1,995	3%				
National Front	Robert Batten	1,086	2%				
Majority					4,449		
Conservative gain from Labour							

=== 2013 ===
North Tyneside Mayoral Election 2 May 2013
Party	Candidate	1st round		2nd round			1st round votesTransfer votes, 2nd round
Party	Candidate	Total	Of round	Transfers	Total	Of round	1st round votesTransfer votes, 2nd round
Labour	Norma Redfearn	27,905	55.76%				
Conservative	Linda Arkley	18,083	36.14%				
Liberal Democrats	John Appleby	4,054	8.10%				
Majority					9,822		
Labour gain from Conservative							

=== 2017 ===
North Tyneside Mayoral Election 04 May 2017
Party	Candidate	1st round		2nd round			1st round votesTransfer votes, 2nd round
Party	Candidate	Total	Of round	Transfers	Total	Of round	1st round votesTransfer votes, 2nd round
Labour	Norma Redfearn	29,655	56.4%				
Conservative	Stewart Hay	16,164	30.7%				
Liberal Democrats	John Appleby	3,537	6.7%				
UKIP	Stuart Houghton	3,248	6.2%				
Majority					13,491		
Turnout		52,604					
Labour hold		Swing	▲6.1				

=== 2021 ===
North Tyneside Mayoral Election 06 May 2021
Party	Candidate	1st round		2nd round			1st round votesTransfer votes, 2nd round
Party	Candidate	Total	Of round	Transfers	Total	Of round	1st round votesTransfer votes, 2nd round
Labour	Norma Redfearn	33,119	53.3%				
Conservative	Steven Robinson	19,366	31.2%				
Green	Penny Remfry	4,278	6.9%				
Liberal Democrats	John Appleby	3,549	5.7%				
UKIP	Jack Thomson	1,753	2.8%				
Majority					13,753		
Turnout		62,065					
Labour hold		Swing					

=== 2025 ===
First election held after the electoral system for mayoral elections in England were changed in 2023 from supplementary vote to first-past-the-post voting by the Elections Act 2022.

North Tyneside Mayoral Election 1 May 2025
List	Candidates	Votes	Of total (%)	± from prev.
Labour	Karen Clark	16,230	30.2	−23.2
Reform	John Falkenstein	15,786	29.4	New
Conservative	Liam Bones	11,017	20.5	−10.7
Green	Chloe-Louise Reilly	3,980	7.4	+0.5
Liberal Democrats	John Appleby	3,453	6.4	+0.7
Independent	Cath Davis	1,780	3.3	New
Independent	Martin Uren	1,460	2.7	New
Majority		444	0.8	
Rejected ballots		93	0.2	
Turnout		53,799	33.6	−5.8
Registered electors		159,717		
Labour hold				

== Deputy mayor and cabinet ==
The Mayor of North Tyneside appoints a deputy mayor and a cabinet, which they also chair.

=== Redfearn mayorality ===
Norma Redfearn served as Mayor of North Tyneside from 2013 to 2025. She appointed her cabinet a week after her election in May 2013, with Bruce Pickard chosen to serve as her deputy. She reshuffled most of her cabinet after her re-election in 2017, though her deputy Pickard and some other cabinet members remained in their previous positions. For her third term from 2021, she appointed a fully new cabinet with Carl Johnson now serving as her deputy mayor. She also introduced the non-cabinet position of Armed Forces Champion, which went to Andy Newman.

Redfearn mayoral cabinet
Portfolio	Member	Term
First Redfearn Mayoral Cabinet
Mayor of North Tyneside	Norma Redfearn	2013–2025
Deputy Mayor	Bruce Pickard	2013–2021
Finance and Resources	Ray Glindon	2013–2021
Economic Development	Frank Lott	2013–2017
Adult Social Care	Lesley Spillard	2013–2017
Leisure, Culture and Tourism	Eddie Darke	2013–2021
Housing and Environment	John Harrison	2013–2017
Sustainable Development	John Stirling	2013–2017
Community Engagement	Carole Gambling	2017–2025
Children, Young People and Learning	Ian Grayson	2017–2025
Second Redfearn Mayoral Cabinet
Mayor of North Tyneside	Norma Redfearn	2013–2017
Deputy Mayor	Bruce Pickard	2013–2021
Finance and Resources	Ray Glindon	2013–2021
Adult Social Care	G Bell	2017–2021
Leisure, Culture and Tourism	Eddie Darke	2013–2021
Public Health and Wellbeing	M Hall	2017–2021
Housing and Transport	John Harrison	2017–2021
Environment	John Stirling	2017–2021
Community Engagement	C Burdis	2017–2021
Children, Young People and Learning	Ian Grayson	2017–2021
Third Redfearn Mayoral Cabinet
Mayor of North Tyneside	Norma Redfearn	2013–2025
Deputy Mayor	Carl Johnson	2021–present
Finance and Resources	Martin Rankin	2021–2025
Adult Social Care	Anthony McMullen	2021–2025
Culture, Sport and Leisure	Sarah Day	2021–2025
Public Health and Wellbeing	Karen Clark	2021–2025
Housing	Steve Cox	2021–2025
Environment	Sandra Graham	2021–2025
Community Safety and Public Protection	Carole Burdis	2021–2025
Children, Young People and Learning	Peter Earley	2021–2025

=== Clark mayoralty ===
Karen Clark was elected Mayor of North Tyneside on 2 May 2025. She appointed her cabinet within the same month.

Mayoral cabinet of Karen Clark (2025–present)
Portfolio	Member	Term
Mayor of North Tyneside	Karen Clark	2025–present
Deputy Mayor	Carl Johnson	2021–present
Finance and Resources	Anthony McMullen	2025–present
Adult Social Care	Janet Hunter	2025–present
Public Health and Socio-Economic Inequalities	Joan Walker	2025–present
Housing	John Harrison	2025–present
Environment	Hannah Johnson	2025–present
Community Safety and the Climate Emergency	Sandra Graham	2025–present
Supporting and Protecting Children	Peter Earley	2025–present
Education, Inclusion, Employment and Skills	Steven Phillips	2025–present
