= 2022 North Tyneside Metropolitan Borough Council election =

2022 local election in North Tyneside

2022 North Tyneside Council election
- 5 May 2022

20 of 60 seats on North Tyneside Metropolitan Borough Council 31 seats needed for a majority
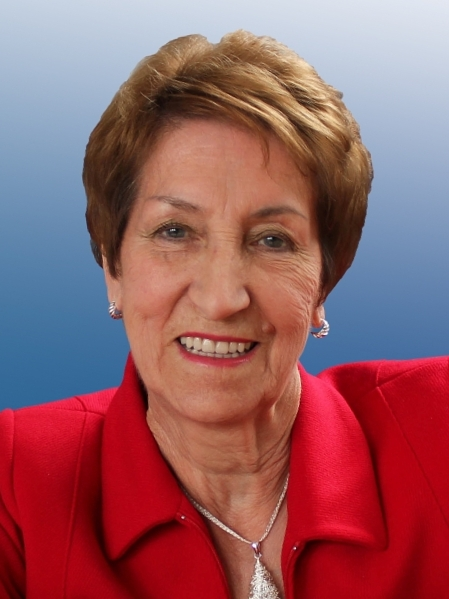
| | First party | Second party |
|---|---|---|
| Leader | Norma Redfearn | Sean Brockbank |
| Party | Labour | Conservative |
| Leader's seat | Mayoralty | Monkseaton South (defeated) |
| Last election | 50 seats, 48.6% | 9 seats, 35.7% |
| Seats won | 51 seats, 54.9% | 9 seats, 28.9% |
| Seat change | Steady | Steady |
| Swing | ▲6.3% | ▼6.8% |
- Map of the results
Council control before election
Labour
Elected Council control
Labour

The 2022 North Tyneside Metropolitan Borough Council election took place on 5 May 2022. One third of councillors—20 out of 60—on North Tyneside Metropolitan Borough Council were elected. The election took place alongside other local elections across the United Kingdom.

In the previous council election in 2021, the Labour Party maintained its control of the council, holding 50 seats after the election, with nine other councillors from the Conservative Party.

== Background ==
Result of the 2021 council election

The Local Government Act 1972 created a two-tier system of metropolitan counties and districts covering Greater Manchester, Merseyside, South Yorkshire, Tyne and Wear, the West Midlands, and West Yorkshire starting in 1974. North Tyneside was a district of the Tyne and Wear metropolitan county. The Local Government Act 1985 abolished the metropolitan counties, with metropolitan districts taking on most of their powers as metropolitan boroughs. The North of Tyne Combined Authority was created in 2018 and began electing the mayor of the North of Tyne from 2019, which was given strategic powers covering a region covering some of the same area as the former Tyne and Wear metropolitan county, as well as Northumberland.

Since its creation, North Tyneside has generally been under Labour control, with some periods of no overall control and Conservative Party control from 2008 to 2013. Labour has had an overall majority of seats on the council since the 2011 election, when the party gained seats. In the most recent council election in 2021, Labour won eighteen seats with 48.6% of the vote to hold 50 overall, while the Conservatives won five seats with 35.7% of the vote to hold nine seats overall. The Green Party received 7.1% of the vote and the Liberal Democrats received 6.2% of the vote but neither party won any seats. North Tyneside has had a single authority mayor since 2001, a position which has been held by Labour and Conservative politicians. Most recently, Norma Redfearn has been the Labour mayor of North Tyneside since 2013, and she was last re-elected in 2021.

The positions up for election in 2021 were last elected in 2018. In that election, Labour won eighteen seats on 56.8% of the vote while the Conservatives won two seats with 31.8% of the vote. The Liberal Democrats received 5.9% of the vote but didn't win any seats.

== Electoral process ==
The council elects its councillors in thirds, with a third being up for election every year for three years, with no election in the fourth year. The election took place by first-past-the-post voting, with all wards being represented by three councillors, one of whom is elected each election year to serve a four-year term.

All registered electors (British, Irish, Commonwealth and European Union citizens) living in North Tyneside aged 18 or over will be entitled to vote in the election. People who live at two addresses in different councils, such as university students with different term-time and holiday addresses, are entitled to be registered for and vote in elections in both local authorities. Voting in-person at polling stations took place from 07:00 to 22:00 on election day, and voters will be able to apply for postal votes or proxy votes in advance of the election.

== Summary ==
=== Council composition ===
| After 2021 election | | After 2022 election | |
| Party | Seats | Party | Seats |
|---|---|---|---|
| Labour | 50 | Labour | 51 |
| Conservative | 9 | Conservative | 9 |
| Independent | 1 | Independent | 0 |

=== Election results ===
2022 North Tyneside Metropolitan Borough Council election
| Party | This election | | | | Full council | | | This election | | |
| Party | Candidates | Seats | Net | Seats % | Other | Total | Total % | Votes | Votes % | +/− |
|---|---|---|---|---|---|---|---|---|---|---|
| Labour | {{{candidates}}} | 18 | Steady | 90.0 | 33 | 51 | 85.0 | 31,620 | 54.9 | +6.3 |
| Conservative | {{{candidates}}} | 2 | Steady | 10.0 | 7 | 9 | 15.0 | 16,644 | 28.9 | -6.8 |
| Independent | {{{candidates}}} | 0 | Steady | 0.0 | 0 | 0 | 0.0 | 978 | 1.7 | +1.3 |
| Green | {{{candidates}}} | 0 | Steady | 0.0 | 0 | 0 | 0.0 | 5,436 | 9.4 | +2.3 |
| Liberal Democrats | {{{candidates}}} | 0 | Steady | 0.0 | 0 | 0 | 0.0 | 1,992 | 3.5 | -2.7 |
| TUSC | {{{candidates}}} | 0 | Steady | 0.0 | 0 | 0 | 0.0 | 427 | 0.7 | -0.2 |
| UKIP | {{{candidates}}} | 0 | Steady | 0.0 | 0 | 0 | 0.0 | 380 | 0.7 | -0.2 |
| Reform | {{{candidates}}} | 0 | Steady | 0.0 | 0 | 0 | 0.0 | 110 | 0.2 | ±0.0 |

== Ward results ==
=== Battle Hill ===
Battle Hill Ward
| Party | Candidate | Votes | % | ±% |
|---|---|---|---|---|
| Labour | Steven Phillips * | 1,716 | 66.8 | ▼2.5 |
| Conservative | Jean Murray | 528 | 20.6 | ▲2.3 |
| Green | Helen Bell | 212 | 8.3 | N/A |
| UKIP | Jane McEachan | 113 | 4.4 | N/A |
| Majority | | 1188 | 46.2 | ▼4.8 |
| Turnout | | 2,569 | 32.4 | ▲1.6 |
| Labour hold | | Swing | ▼2.4 | |

=== Benton ===
Benton Ward
| Party | Candidate | Votes | % | ±% |
|---|---|---|---|---|
| Labour | Josephine Mudzingwa | 1,577 | 50.3 | ▼15.3 |
| Independent | David Arthur | 594 | 18.9 | N/A |
| Conservative | Wayne Kavanagh | 534 | 17.0 | ▼9.5 |
| Liberal Democrats | Jay Beyer | 244 | 7.8 | ▼0.1 |
| Green | Allie Wilson Craw | 194 | 6.2 | N/A |
| Majority | | 983 | 31.3 | ▼7.8 |
| Turnout | | 3,143 | 40.5 | ▲1.9 |
| Labour hold | | Swing | ▼17.1 | |

=== Camperdown ===
Camperdown Ward
| Party | Candidate | Votes | % | ±% |
|---|---|---|---|---|
| Labour | Lisa Ferasin | 1,427 | 68.4 | ▼5.7 |
| Conservative | David Wallace Lilly | 508 | 24.3 | ▼1.6 |
| Green | John Graham Morley | 152 | 7.3 | N/A |
| Majority | | 919 | 44.0 | ▼4.2 |
| Turnout | | 2,087 | 26.7 | ▼0.7 |
| Labour hold | | Swing | ▼2.1 | |

=== Chirton ===
Chirton Ward
| Party | Candidate | Votes | % | ±% |
|---|---|---|---|---|
| Labour | Rebecca O' Keefe | 1,093 | 54.3 | −6.2 |
| Conservative | Stephen Patrick Bones | 446 | 22.2 | −10.5 |
| TUSC | Graeme Cansdale | 230 | 11.4 | −4.0 |
| Green | Ian William Appleby | 154 | 7.7 | −4.5 |
| UKIP | Jack James Thomson | 89 | 4.4 | −3.8 |
| Majority | | 647 | 32.2 | |
| Turnout | | 2,012 | 26.0 | ▼2.9 |
| Labour hold | | Swing | | |

=== Collingwood ===
Collingwood Ward
| Party | Candidate | Votes | % | ±% |
|---|---|---|---|---|
| Conservative | Olly Scargill | 1,604 | 51.9 | +9.6 |
| Labour | Steve Cox | 1,273 | 41.2 | −8.4 |
| Green | Penny Remfry | 213 | 6.9 | −1.2 |
| Majority | | 331 | 10.7 | |
| Turnout | | 3,090 | 37.4 | ▲2.8 |
| Conservative gain from Labour | | Swing | | |

=== Cullercoats ===
Cullercoats Ward
| Party | Candidate | Votes | % | ±% |
|---|---|---|---|---|
| Labour | Willie Samuel | 1,801 | 48.3 | +6.3 |
| Conservative | Steven Paul Robinson | 1,519 | 40.7 | −5.0 |
| Green | Sophie Joanna McGlinn | 310 | 8.3 | +1.3 |
| UKIP | Pamela Ann Hood | 60 | 1.6 | +1.6 |
| TUSC | John Hoare | 37 | 1 | −1.2 |
| Majority | | 282 | 7.5 | +3.8 |
| Turnout | | 3,727 | 49.9 | ▼1.6 |
| Labour hold | | Swing | +5.6 | |

=== Howdon ===
Howdon Ward
| Party | Candidate | Votes | % | ±% |
|---|---|---|---|---|
| Labour | Tricia Neira | 1,437 | 70.0 | +7.8 |
| Conservative | Robert White | 403 | 19.6 | −2.4 |
| Green | Laura Marley | 213 | 10.4 | +1.4 |
| Majority | | 1,034 | 50.4 | |
| Turnout | | 2,053 | 26.4 | ▼3.7 |
| Labour hold | | Swing | | |

=== Killingworth ===
Killingworth Ward
| Party | Candidate | Votes | % | ±% |
|---|---|---|---|---|
| Labour | Val Jamieson | 1,698 | 58.9 | +5.9 |
| Conservative | John Ord | 822 | 28.5 | −7.6 |
| Green | Deb Altman | 197 | 6.8 | N/A |
| Liberal Democrats | Nathan Kieran Mather Shone | 166 | 5.8 | −5.2 |
| Majority | | 876 | 30.4 | ▼5.4 |
| Turnout | | 2,883 | 31.9 | |
| Labour hold | | Swing | | |

=== Longbenton ===
Longbenton Ward
| Party | Candidate | Votes | % | ±% |
|---|---|---|---|---|
| Labour | Joan Isabel Walker | 1,645 | 68.9 | +3.9 |
| Conservative | Victoria Mary Bones | 428 | 17.9 | −5.3 |
| Green | Steve Manchee | 313 | 13.1 | +1.4 |
| Majority | | 1,217 | 51.0 | |
| Turnout | | 2,386 | 28.5 | ▼4.2 |
| Labour hold | | Swing | | |

=== Monkseaton North ===
Monkseaton North Ward
| Party | Candidate | Votes | % | ±% |
|---|---|---|---|---|
| Labour | Joe Kirwin | 2,336 | 67.8 | +15.8 |
| Conservative | George Partis | 784 | 22.7 | −14.2 |
| Green | Claire Emma Wedderman | 181 | 5.2 | −1.1 |
| Liberal Democrats | David Nisbet | 146 | 4.2 | −0.6 |
| Majority | | 1,552 | 45.0 | +29.9 |
| Turnout | | 3,447 | 50.4 | ▼4.7 |
| Labour hold | | Swing | +15 | |

=== Monkseaton South ===
Monkseaton South Ward
| Party | Candidate | Votes | % | ±% |
|---|---|---|---|---|
| Labour | Martin James Murphy | 1,798 | 50.6 | +5.8 |
| Conservative | Sean Michael Brockbank | 1,412 | 39.7 | −3.9 |
| Green | Neil Oliver Percival | 345 | 9.7 | +2.9 |
| Majority | | 386 | 10.9 | +9.7 |
| Turnout | | 3,555 | 47.4 | ▼2.2 |
| Labour gain from Conservative | | Swing | +4.9 | |

=== Northumberland ===
Northumberland Ward
| Party | Candidate | Votes | % | ±% |
|---|---|---|---|---|
| Labour | Linda Isobel Bell | 1,368 | 64.6 | +20.7 |
| Conservative | Haylee Elizabeth Josendale | 500 | 23.6 | +3.8 |
| Green | Alice Felicity Barnes | 251 | 11.8 | N/A |
| Majority | | 868 | 41.0 | |
| Turnout | | 2,119 | 28.5 | ▼5.4 |
| Labour hold | | Swing | | |

=== Preston ===
Preston Ward
| Party | Candidate | Votes | % | ±% |
|---|---|---|---|---|
| Labour | Cath Davis | 1,526 | 49.4 | −1.9 |
| Conservative | Neil David Graham | 1,268 | 41.0 | +3.2 |
| Green | Rob Wylie | 155 | 5.0 | −7.9 |
| Independent | Frank Stephen Austin | 92 | 3.0 | N/A |
| UKIP | William Hugh Jackson | 49 | 1.6 | −2.2 |
| Majority | | 258 | 8.3 | |
| Turnout | | 3,090 | 46.8 | ▼3.7 |
| Labour hold | | Swing | | |

=== Riverside ===
Riverside Ward
| Party | Candidate | Votes | % | ±% |
|---|---|---|---|---|
| Labour | Charles Bruce Pickard | 1,274 | 60.2 | +4.6 |
| Conservative | Maureen Jeffrey | 472 | 22.3 | −4.2 |
| Green | Nick Martin | 254 | 12.0 | +3.1 |
| TUSC | William George Jarrett | 116 | 5.5 | +1.4 |
| Majority | | 802 | 37.9 | |
| Turnout | | 2,116 | 25.8 | ▼4.1 |
| Labour hold | | Swing | | |

=== St Mary's ===
St Mary's Ward
| Party | Candidate | Votes | % | ±% |
|---|---|---|---|---|
| Conservative | Pamela McIntyre | 1,811 | 49.9 | −19.5 |
| Labour | Grant Michael Morris | 1,195 | 32.9 | +2.7 |
| Independent | Alison Austin | 292 | 8.0 | N/A |
| Liberal Democrats | Janet Elizabeth Appleby | 170 | 4.7 | −6.1 |
| Green | Kate Percival | 164 | 4.5 | −5.7 |
| Majority | | 616 | 17.0 | |
| Turnout | | 3,632 | 51.5 | ▼4.9 |
| Conservative hold | | Swing | | |

=== Tynemouth ===
Tynemouth Ward
| Party | Candidate | Votes | % | ±% |
|---|---|---|---|---|
| Labour | Sarah Day* | 2,045 | 49.8 | ▲8.3 |
| Conservative | Ian McAlpine | 1,576 | 38.4 | ▼5.5 |
| Green | Simon Smithson | 410 | 10.0 | ▼0.3 |
| UKIP | Henry Marshall | 69 | 1.7 | N/A |
| Majority | | 469 | 11.4 | ▲9.8 |
| Turnout | | 4,100 | 49.8 | ▼2.3 |
| Labour hold | | Swing | ▲6.9 | |

=== Valley ===
Valley Ward
| Party | Candidate | Votes | % | ±% |
|---|---|---|---|---|
| Labour | Brian Burdis | 1,823 | 64.5 | +6.8 |
| Conservative | Julian Pratt | 591 | 20.9 | −6.9 |
| Green | Roger Werner Maier | 304 | 10.7 | +1.0 |
| Reform | Gordon Fletcher | 110 | 3.9 | −0.9 |
| Majority | | 1,232 | 43.6 | |
| Turnout | | 2,828 | 28.1 | ▼3.7 |
| Labour hold | | Swing | | |

=== Wallsend ===
Wallsend Ward
| Party | Candidate | Votes | % | ±% |
|---|---|---|---|---|
| Labour | Louise Dolores Marshall | 1,498 | 67.0 | +15.2 |
| Conservative | Ian Jones | 358 | 16.0 | −2.6 |
| Liberal Democrats | Harriet Annabella Stanway | 202 | 9.0 | −12.8 |
| Green | Julia Hayward | 178 | 8.0 | +0.2 |
| Majority | | 1,140 | 51.0 | |
| Turnout | | 2,236 | 29.7 | ▼2.5 |
| Labour hold | | Swing | | |

=== Weetslade ===
Weetslade Ward
| Party | Candidate | Votes | % | ±% |
|---|---|---|---|---|
| Labour | Michelle Maria Fox | 1,330 | 43.9 | +3.7 |
| Liberal Democrats | Daniel John Elsom | 1,064 | 35.1 | +9.5 |
| Conservative | Trish Gargett | 635 | 21.0 | −11.2 |
| Majority | | 266 | 8.8 | |
| Turnout | | 3,029 | 37.6 | ▼3.0 |
| Labour hold | | Swing | | |

=== Whitley Bay ===
Whitley Bay Ward
| Party | Candidate | Votes | % | ±% |
|---|---|---|---|---|
| Labour | Margaret Hall | 1,760 | 50.5 | +6.0 |
| Green | Alan Steele | 1,236 | 35.5 | +7.4 |
| Conservative | Stewart Thomas Hay | 445 | 12.7 | −8.1 |
| TUSC | Gordon Bell | 44 | 1.2 | −0.1 |
| Majority | | 524 | 15.0 | −1.3 |
| Turnout | | 3,485 | 47.5 | ▼2.0 |
| Labour hold | | Swing | -0.7 | |

=== By-elections ===
==== Camperdown ====
Camperdown: 14 July 2022
| Party | Candidate | Votes | % | |
|---|---|---|---|---|
| Labour | Peter Earley | 873 | 59.0 | ▼8.9 |
| Conservative | Haylee Josendale | 388 | 26.2 | ▼5.9 |
| Liberal Democrats | Jay Beyer | 124 | 8.4 | |
| Green | Michael Newton | 58 | 3.9 | |
| UKIP | Jack Thomson | 36 | 2.4 | |
| Majority | | 485 | 32.8 | |
| Turnout | | 1479 | | |
| Labour hold | | Swing | | |

The Camperdown by-election followed the automatic disqualification of councillor Jim Allan, who had not attended formal council meetings because of ill health and for whom no mitigating action had been taken.
