= Newham South (electoral division) =

Electoral division in Greater London, 1973–1986

- Former electoral division for the Greater London Council
- Newham South electoral division boundaries
- District: Newham
- Electorate: 66,536 (1973); 65,607 (1977); 64,499 (1981)
- Area: 1,843 hectares (18.43 km^{2})

Former electoral division
- Created: 1973
- Abolished: 1986
- Member: 1
- Created from: Newham

Newham South was an electoral division for the purposes of elections to the Greater London Council. The constituency elected one councillor for a four-year term in 1973, 1977 and 1981, with the final term extended for an extra year ahead of the abolition of the Greater London Council.

== History ==
It was planned to use the same boundaries as the Westminster Parliament constituencies for election of councillors to the Greater London Council (GLC), as had been the practice for elections to the predecessor London County Council, but those that existed in 1965 crossed the Greater London boundary. Until new constituencies could be settled, the 32 London boroughs were used as electoral areas. The London Borough of Newham formed the Newham electoral division. This was used for the Greater London Council elections in 1964, 1967 and 1970.

The new constituencies were settled following the Second Periodic Review of Westminster constituencies and the new electoral division matched the boundaries of the Newham South parliamentary constituency.

It covered an area of 1,843 hectares (18.43 km^{2}).

== Elections ==
The Newham South constituency was used for the Greater London Council elections in 1973, 1977 and 1981. One councillor was elected at each election using first-past-the-post voting.

=== 1973 election ===
The fourth election to the GLC (and first using revised boundaries) was held on 12 April 1973. The electorate was 66,536 and one Labour Party councillor was elected. The turnout was 26.1%. The councillor was elected for a three-year term. This was extended for an extra year in 1976 when the electoral cycle was switched to four-yearly.

1973 Greater London Council election: Newham South
Party	Candidate	Votes	%	±%
Labour	Edward Percy Bell	10,024	82.00	
Conservative	J. Johnston	1,579	12.92	
Communist	R. A. Offley	623	5.10	
Majority		8,445	69.1	
Turnout			21.3	
Labour win (new seat)				

=== 1977 election ===
The fifth election to the GLC (and second using revised boundaries) was held on 5 May 1977. The electorate was 65,607 and one Labour Party councillor was elected. The turnout was 36.4%. The councillor was elected for a four-year term.

1977 Greater London Council election: Newham South
Party	Candidate	Votes	%	±%
Labour	Edward Percy Bell	9,450	54.69	
Conservative	N. A. M. Thompson	4,229	24.47	
National Front	V. Roberts	2,600	15.05	
Liberal	R. Winfield	591	3.42	
Communist	R. A. Offley	410	2.37	
Turnout				
Labour hold		Swing		

=== 1981 election ===
The sixth and final election to the GLC (and third using revised boundaries) was held on 7 May 1981. The electorate was 64,499 and one Labour Party councillor was elected. The turnout was 35.8%. The councillor was elected for a four-year term, extended by an extra year by the Local Government (Interim Provisions) Act 1984, ahead of the abolition of the council.

1981 Greater London Council election: Newham South
Party	Candidate	Votes	%	±%
Labour	Thomas A. Jenkinson	11,238	70.58	
Conservative	Robert F. Williams	1,899	11.93	
Liberal	William P. Galinis	1,780	11.18	
National Front	Michael B. Hipperson	1,006	6.32	
Turnout				
Labour hold		Swing		
