= Newham North West (electoral division) =

Electoral division in Greater London, 1973–1986

- Former electoral division for the Greater London Council
- District: Newham
- Electorate: 52,702 (1973); 54,219 (1977); 51,060 (1981)
- Major settlements: Stratford
- Area: 894 hectares (8.94 km^{2})

Former electoral division
- Created: 1973
- Abolished: 1986
- Member: 1
- Created from: Newham

Newham North West was an electoral division for the purposes of elections to the Greater London Council. The constituency elected one councillor for a four-year term in 1973, 1977 and 1981, with the final term extended for an extra year ahead of the abolition of the Greater London Council.

== History ==
It was planned to use the same boundaries as the Westminster Parliament constituencies for election of councillors to the Greater London Council (GLC), as had been the practice for elections to the predecessor London County Council, but those that existed in 1965 crossed the Greater London boundary. Until new constituencies could be settled, the 32 London boroughs were used as electoral areas. The London Borough of Newham formed the Newham electoral division. This was used for the Greater London Council elections in 1964, 1967 and 1970.

The new constituencies were settled following the Second Periodic Review of Westminster constituencies and the new electoral division matched the boundaries of the Newham North West parliamentary constituency.

It covered an area of 894 hectares (8.94 km^{2}).

== Elections ==
The Newham North West constituency was used for the Greater London Council elections in 1973, 1977 and 1981. One councillor was elected at each election using first-past-the-post voting. Arthur Frank George Edwards, who was successful at all three elections, was previously elected to represent Newham in 1964, 1967 and 1970.

=== 1973 election ===
The fourth election to the GLC (and first using revised boundaries) was held on 12 April 1973. The electorate was 52,702 and one Labour Party councillor was elected. The turnout was 18.9%. The councillor was elected for a three-year term. This was extended for an extra year in 1976 when the electoral cycle was switched to four-yearly.

1973 Greater London Council election: Newham North West
Party	Candidate	Votes	%	±%
Labour	Arthur Frank George Edwards	8,031	80.45	
Conservative	S. Swerling	1,951	19.55	
Majority		6,080	61.0	
Turnout			18.9	
Labour win (new seat)				

=== 1977 election ===
The fifth election to the GLC (and second using revised boundaries) was held on 5 May 1977. The electorate was 54,219 and one Labour Party councillor was elected. The turnout was 29.6%. The councillor was elected for a four-year term.

1977 Greater London Council election: Newham North West
Party	Candidate	Votes	%	±%
Labour	Arthur Frank George Edwards	8,608	53.58	
Conservative	David Anthony Andrew Amess	5,240	32.62	
National Front	C. A. Armond	1,554	9.67	
Liberal	B. G. McCarthy	664	4.13	
Turnout				
Labour hold		Swing		

=== 1981 election ===
The sixth and final election to the GLC (and third using revised boundaries) was held on 7 May 1981. The electorate was 51,060 and one Labour Party councillor was elected. The turnout was 33.0%. The councillor was elected for a four-year term, extended by an extra year by the Local Government (Interim Provisions) Act 1984, ahead of the abolition of the council.

1981 Greater London Council election: Newham North West
Party	Candidate	Votes	%	±%
Labour	Arthur Frank George Edwards	11,724	69.57	
Conservative	D. R. Bick	2,530	15.01	
Liberal	C. M. Hill	1,845	10.95	
National Front	W. J. Roberts	753	4.47	
Turnout				
Labour hold		Swing		
