= Newham (electoral division) =

Electoral division in Greater London, 1965–1973

- Former electoral division for the Greater London Council
- Newham electoral division boundaries
- District: London Borough of Newham
- Population: 252,090 (1969 estimate)
- Electorate: 178,883 (1964); 174,865 (1967); 182,834 (1970)
- Area: 8,986.1 acres (36.365 km^{2})

Former electoral division
- Created: 1965
- Abolished: 1973
- Member(s): 3
- Replaced by: Newham North East, Newham North West and Newham South

Newham was an electoral division for the purposes of elections to the Greater London Council. The constituency elected three councillors for a three-year term in 1964, 1967 and 1970.

== History ==
It was planned to use the same boundaries as the Westminster Parliament constituencies for election of councillors to the Greater London Council (GLC), as had been the practice for elections to the predecessor London County Council, but those that existed in 1965 crossed the Greater London boundary. Until new constituencies could be settled, the 32 London boroughs were used as electoral areas which therefore created a constituency called Newham.

The electoral division was replaced from 1973 by the single-member electoral divisions of Newham North East, Newham North West and Newham South.

== Elections ==
The Newham constituency was used for the Greater London Council elections in 1964, 1967 and 1970. Three councillors were elected at each election using first-past-the-post voting.

=== 1964 election ===
The first election was held on 9 April 1964, a year before the council came into its powers. The electorate was 178,883 and three Labour Party councillors were elected. With 53,675 people voting, the turnout was 30.0%. The councillors were elected for a three-year term.

1964 Greater London Council election: Newham
Party	Candidate	Votes	%	±%
Labour	Samuel Boyce	34,429		
Labour	Edward Percy Bell	33,568		
Labour	Arthur Frank George Edwards	30,674		
Liberal	D. A. S. Brooke	9,476		
Conservative	C. A. Rugg	7,616		
Conservative	B. C. Balcomb	7,155		
Conservative	W. C. Willis	6,717		
Liberal	E. Johnson	6,119		
Liberal	R. A. Savill	5,703		
Communist	J. A. Walker	2,757		
Turnout				
Labour win (new seat)				
Labour win (new seat)				
Labour win (new seat)				

=== 1967 election ===
The second election was held on 13 April 1967. The electorate was 174,865 and three Labour Party councillors were elected. With 44,289 people voting, the turnout was 25.3%. The councillors were elected for a three-year term.

1967 Greater London Council election: Newham
Party	Candidate	Votes	%	±%
Labour	Samuel Boyce	23,383		
Labour	Edward Percy Bell	22,801		
Labour	Arthur Frank George Edwards	21,826		
Conservative	G. L. Crocker	11,102		
Conservative	C. A. Rugg	9,442		
Conservative	B. C. Balcomb	9,442		
Liberal	A. B .M. Bijl-Jarvis	5,039		
Liberal	R. P. McCarthy	4,365		
Liberal	P. T. Humphrey	4,117		
Independent	J. Clements	2,626		
Communist	R. A. Offley	2,164		
Independent	R. A. Savill	1,234		
Turnout				
Labour hold		Swing		
Labour hold		Swing		
Labour hold		Swing		

=== 1970 election ===
The third election was held on 9 April 1970. The electorate was 182,834 and three Labour Party councillors were elected. With 34,201 people voting, the turnout was 18.7%. The councillors were elected for a three-year term.

1970 Greater London Council election: Newham
Party	Candidate	Votes	%	±%
Labour	Samuel Boyce	19,728		
Labour	Edward Percy Bell	19,529		
Labour	Arthur Frank George Edwards	17,681		
Conservative	C. A. Knight	9,868		
Conservative	R. E. Wotherspoon	9,806		
Conservative	B. C. Balcomb	8,154		
Liberal	B. G. McCarthy	2,030		
Liberal	E. Wren	1,741		
Homes before Roads	M. Brown	1,693		
Liberal	Mrs J. Wren	1,446		
Independent	J. Clements	961		
Communist	R. A. Offley	956		
Homes before Roads	D. E. Coxhead	613		
Homes before Roads	M. Fior	457		
Union Movement	A. L. J. Winn	313		
Turnout				
Labour hold		Swing		
Labour hold		Swing		
Labour hold		Swing		
