= 2018 North Tyneside Metropolitan Borough Council election =

2018 UK local government election

Map showing the results of the 2018 North Tyneside Metropolitan Borough Council election

The 2018 North Tyneside Metropolitan Borough Council election took place on 3 May 2018 to elect members of North Tyneside Metropolitan Borough Council in England. This was held on the same day as other local elections.

All of the seats being contested were last contested in 2014, and these results are compared to the results of 2016.

== Battle Hill ==
Battle Hill
Party	Candidate	Votes	%	±%
Labour	Steven Phillips	1,719	69.3	−4.6
Conservative	David Inness	453	18.3	−1.3
Liberal Democrats	Margaret Finlay	310	12.5	+12.5
Majority		1,266	51	−3.3
Turnout		2,482	30.8	−1.2
Labour hold		Swing	-1.7	

== Benton ==
Benton
Party	Candidate	Votes	%	±%
Labour	Peter Earley	1,952	65.6	+4.9
Conservative	George Partis	789	26.5	+9.2
Liberal Democrats	Joan Harvey	235	7.9	+7.9
Majority		1,163	39.1	−4
Turnout		2,976	38.6	−1.1
Labour hold		Swing	-2.2	

== Camperdown ==
Camperdown
Party	Candidate	Votes	%	±%
Labour	Janice Mole	1,565	74.1	+15.5
Conservative	David Sarin	547	25.9	+16.2
Majority		1,018	48.2	+21.4
Turnout		2,112	27.4	+0.6
Labour hold		Swing	-0.4	

== Chirton ==
Chirton
Party	Candidate	Votes	%	±%
Labour	Margaret Reynolds	1,412	75.8	+14.3
Conservative	Susan Rodgerson	451	24.2	+13.9
Majority		961	51.6	+18.2
Turnout		1,863	24.2	−1.9
Labour hold		Swing	+0.2	

== Collingwood ==
Collingwood
Party	Candidate	Votes	%	±%
Labour	Steve Cox	1,555	59.7	+8.1
Conservative	Lewis Austin	1,051	40.3	+12.8
Majority		504	19.3	−4.8
Turnout		2,606	31.3	−3.2
Labour hold		Swing	-2.4	

== Cullercoats ==
Cullercoats
Party	Candidate	Votes	%	±%
Labour	Willie Samuel	1,626	46.3	−3.6
Conservative	Kenneth Barrie	1,585	45.1	+4.9
Green	Nick Martin	213	6.1	+6.1
UKIP	Pamela Hood	89	2.5	−7.4
Majority		41	1.2	−8.6
Turnout		3,513	47.6	−2.9
Labour gain from Conservative		Swing	-4.3	

== Howdon ==
Howdon
Party	Candidate	Votes	%	±%
Conservative	Christopher Johnston	246	12.7	+5.8
UKIP	Gary Legg	183	8.7	−11.3
Labour	Maureen Madden	1,534	72.7	+2.6
Liberal Democrats	June Smith	146	6.9	

== Killingworth ==
Killingworth
Party	Candidate	Votes	%	±%
Labour	Linda Darke	1,715	63.9	−2.7
Conservative	Margaret Marshall	739	27.6	+11.2
Liberal Democrats	Jonathan Olsson	228	8.5	N/A

== Longbenton ==
Longbenton
Party	Candidate	Votes	%	±%
Liberal Democrats	Darryl Roe	152	6.5	N/A
Conservative	Robin Underwood	449	19.3	+1.0
Labour	Joan Walker	1722	74.1	−7.6

== Monkseaton North ==
Monkseaton North
Party	Candidate	Votes	%	±%
Labour	Joe Kirwin	1,649	47.1	+6.9
Conservative	Les Miller	1,621	46.3	+0.2
Liberal Democrats	David Nisbet	180	5.1	−1.1
UKIP	Stephen Borlos	50	1.4	−6.1
Majority		28	0.8	−5.8
Turnout		3,500	50.1	−0.4
Labour gain from Conservative		Swing	+3.4	

== Monkseaton South ==
Monkseaton South
Party	Candidate	Votes	%	±%
Conservative	Sean Brockbank	1,707	46.5	+7.5
Labour	Ian Grayson	1,645	44.8	+4.8
Green	Julia Erskine	116	3.2	−4.7
Liberal Democrats	Simon Roffe	100	2.7	+2.7
UKIP	Phyllis Masters	67	1.8	−11.3
Renew	Alex Jacobs	33	0.9	+0.9
Majority		62	1.7	+0.7
Turnout		3,668	48.9	+3.8
Conservative gain from Labour		Swing	+1.4	

== Northumberland ==
Northumberland
Party	Candidate	Votes	%	±%
Labour	Trish Brady	996	45.3	+3.1
Liberal Democrats	Marian Huscroft	972	44.2	−7.8
Conservative	Miriam Smith	230	10.5	+4.7

== Preston ==
Preston
Party	Candidate	Votes	%	±%
Labour	Kate Osborne	1,255	50.5	+1.0
Conservative	Glynis Barrie	1,052	42.3	+4.0
Green	Martin Osborne	179	7.2	+7.2

== Riverside ==
Riverside
Party	Candidate	Votes	%	±%
Labour	Charles Pickard	1,329	65.6	−0.9
Conservative	Maureen Jeffrey	343	16.9	+5.6
Green	Rosie Hamilton	182	9	+9
UKIP	Tony Kearney	172	8.5	−13.7
Majority		986	48.7	+4.3
Turnout		2,026	25.3	−0.9
Labour hold		Swing	-3.3	

== St Mary's ==
St Mary's
Party	Candidate	Votes	%	±%
Conservative	Pam McIntyre	2,113	59.4	−6.3
Labour	Paul Richardson	1,187	33.3	+8.4
Liberal Democrats	Janet Appleby	173	4.9	+4.9
UKIP	William Jackson	87	2.4	−6.9
Majority		926	26	−14.8
Turnout		3,560	50.9	−1.8
Conservative hold		Swing	-7.4	

== Tynemouth ==
Tynemouth
Party	Candidate	Votes	%	±%
Labour	Sarah Day	1,641	42.6	+1.8
Conservative	Lewis Bartoli	1,321	34.3	−2.2
Independent	Jean McLaughlin	486	12.6	−2.3
Renew	Tom Bailey	142	3.7	+3.7
Green	Alan Steele	139	3.6	+3.6
UKIP	Henry Marshall	59	1.5	−6.3
Liberal Democrats	Thomas Clarke	58	1.5	+1.5
Majority		320	9.1	+4.9
Turnout		3,846	46.9	+1.2
Labour hold		Swing	+2	

== Valley ==
Valley
Party	Candidate	Votes	%	±%
Labour	Brian Burdis	1,561	63	−0.8
Conservative	David Lilly	493	19.9	+3.9
UKIP	Jim Davey	157	6.3	−13.9
Green	John Morley	139	5.6	+5.6
Independent	Andrew Pattinson	129	5.2	+5.2
Majority		1,068	43.1	−0.5
Turnout		2,479	27.6	−0.2
Labour hold		Swing	-2.4	

== Wallsend ==
Wallsend
Party	Candidate	Votes	%	±%
Labour	Linda Bell	1,337	58.9	+12.6
Liberal Democrats	Jonathon Proctor	445	19.6	−18.8
Conservative	Liam Bones	289	12.7	+8.6
Green	Martin Collins	199	8.8	+8.8
Majority		892	39.3	+31.4
Turnout		2,270	29.8	−1.7
Labour hold		Swing	+15.7	

== Weetslade ==
Weetslade
Party	Candidate	Votes	%	±%
Labour	Joanne Cassidy	1,775	62.4	+8.3
Conservative	Barbara Stevens	1,068	37.6	+12.5
Majority		707	24.9	−4.1
Turnout		2,843	36.4	−1.1
Labour hold		Swing	-2.1	

== Whitley Bay ==
Whitley Bay
Party	Candidate	Votes	%	±%
Labour	Margaret Hall	1,796	59.3	−0.5
Conservative	Frank Austin	783	25.9	−1.5
Liberal Democrats	John Appleby	224	7.4	+2.7
Green	Sophie Reid-McGlinn	223	7.4	+7.4
Majority		1,013	33.5	+1.1
Turnout		3,026	42	+0.8
Labour hold		Swing	+0.5	
