= John Wilson (London politician) =

Labour Party member of the Greater London Council (born 1941)

John Wilson (born c. 1941) was a Labour Party member of the Greater London Council from May 1977 until the council was abolished in 1986. He was Chief Whip of the Labour group in 1984 when Ken Livingstone resigned from the GLC to force a by-election aimed at showing the popularity of the GLC. Wilson acted as Leader of the GLC while Livingstone was not a member.

== Labour Party activist ==
Wilson was a professional electrician working for London Transport. He joined the Labour Party in Wall End, East Ham, in February 1970, and that October was selected as a local election candidate; in May 1971, he was elected as a Labour councillor on Newham London Borough Council representing Wall End ward.

On the left wing of the party, Wilson frequently proposed resolutions at the local branch. He supported the Upper Clyde Shipbuilders work-in and criticised the 69 Labour MPs who had supported EEC entry as supporting a "violently reactionary" Conservative government. Wilson was also a delegate to the Newham North East Constituency Labour Party from the Newham Bus Garage branch of the EETPU in November 1973, when he first proposed a motion of no confidence in the constituency's sitting Labour MP, Reg Prentice. He was provoked by Prentice's criticism of trade unionists who had been leading protests against the Industrial Relations Act 1971, in particular the Pentonville Five.

While Prentice continued as the MP, criticism of him by the local party continued. in 1975 Wilson moved a motion inviting Prentice to retire at the next election (such a motion being the established way to deselect a sitting Labour MP). The motion passed by 12 votes to 8 at a meeting of the local party Executive at the end of June 1975, and was subsequently ratified by a meeting of the entire local party. Prentice eventually defected to the Conservatives.

== GLC member ==
When Tom Jenkinson announced his retirement as the member for Newham North East on the Greater London Council, Wilson was selected as Labour candidate to succeed him. He was elected at the 1977 elections, increasing the Labour vote compared with the last election in 1973. He was elected again in 1981 with an increased majority.

=== Leadership ===
As part of their campaign against abolition of the GLC, Ken Livingstone and three colleagues resigned their seats in August 1984 to force byelections at which they would invite the electorate to express their opinion. With Livingstone no longer a councillor for the period of the byelection, the council administration was transferred to the Policy Committee of which Wilson was the most senior member, and he was designated as the interim council leader. The Conservatives on the council refused to recognise his authority, but his name was quickly added to the list of GLC Leaders engraved outside the council chamber.

Political offices
Preceded by Ken Livingstone	Acting Leader of the Greater London Council; 1984	Succeeded by Ken Livingstone
