= Gay Rights Working Party =

1980s government committee in London

Gay Rights Working Party was a working party (committee) of the Greater London Council (GLC), which met between 1981 and 1986, when the GLC was abolished.

The working party was formed in 1976 to investigate gay issues in London. The party was particularly concerned with policy addressing employment rights and police attitudes, and liaised with gay groups throughout the capital, helping them apply for grants from the GLC. They also planned the London Lesbian and Gay Centre, which closed in 1991.

Its work culminated in the publication of Changing the World: a London charter for gay and lesbian rights. The charter included 142 specific recommendations to improve the lives of gay and lesbian Londoners.

One of the important point of its activity was the forming of the Gay London Police Monitoring Group in 1982.
