= Greater London Area War Risk Study =

In-depth scientific study on how well Greater London would survive a nuclear war

The Greater London Area War Risk Study (GLAWARS) was an in depth scientific investigation of how well Greater London, England would survive a nuclear war. It was commissioned in 1984 by the Greater London Council and carried out by the Polytechnic of South Bank under the direction of Dr. Anne Ehrlich of Stanford University, Dr. S. William A. Gunn, head of the International Red Cross, Dr. Stuart Horner of the Croydon Health Authority, U.S. Vice Admiral John M. Lee and Dr. Peter Sharfman from the U.S. Congress Office of Technology Assessment.

The Study's findings were published in 1986 in the form of a 397-page book titled, London Under Attack: The Report of the Greater London War Risk Study.

The study cost £500,000 to produce. The study featured 5 distinct scenarios.

The archives are held at the London South Bank University Archives Centre.
