= 2016 North Tyneside Metropolitan Borough Council election =

2016 local election in England

Results of the 2016 North Tyneside Metropolitan Borough Council election

The 2016 North Tyneside Metropolitan Borough Council election took place on 5 May 2016 to elect members of North Tyneside Metropolitan Borough Council in England. This was on the same day as other local elections.

All of the seats being contested were last contested in 2012, and these results are compared to the results of 2015.

== Result summary ==
North Tyneside Council Election Result 2016
Party	Seats	Gains	Losses	Net gain/loss	Seats %	Votes %	Votes	+/−
Labour	51	2	0	+2	85.0	51.6	28,387	-0.2
Conservative	7	0	2	-2	11.6	27.1	14,960	-0.3
UKIP	0	0	0	0	0.0	11.7	6,458	-4.0
Liberal Democrats	2	0	0	0	3.33	4.7	2,512	+1.8
Independent	0	0	0	0	0.0	3.1	1,740	+3.1
TUSC	0	0	0	0	0.0	0.1	287	0.0
Green	0	0	0	0	0.0	0.1	268	-1.8

== Council composition ==
Prior to the election the composition of the council was:

↓
49	9	2
Labour	Conservative	Lib; Dem

After the election the composition of the council was:

↓
51	7	2
Labour	Conservative	Lib; Dem

== Candidates by party ==
20 / 20 16 / 20 3 / 20 1 / 20	20 / 20 4 / 20 3 / 20

There were a total of 67 candidates standing across the 20 seats - an average of 3.35 in each ward. The Labour Party and Conservative Party were both fielding a full slate of 20 candidates. The United Kingdom Independence Party were fielding 16 candidates. There were 4 candidates representing the Liberal Democrats and 3 representing the Trade Unionist and Socialist Coalition and standing as Independent candidates respectively. 1 candidate was representing the Green Party.

Since the last local election in 2015, the number of candidates representing Labour, the Conservatives, and the TUSC was unchanged. Independent candidates increased by 3, the Liberal Democrats had an increase of 1 candidate, and the Green Party and United Kingdom Independence Party both had a decrease of 4 candidates.

== Results by ward ==
=== Battle Hill ===
Battle Hill
Party	Candidate	Votes	%	±%
Labour	Carl Johnson	1,914	73.9	+13.5
Conservative	Jessica Bushbye	507	19.6	+5.1
TUSC	John Hoare	169	6.5	+6.5
Majority		1,407	54.3	+18.9
Turnout		2,590	32	−28.5
Labour hold		Swing	+4.2	

=== Benton ===
Benton
Party	Candidate	Votes	%	±%
Labour	Pat Oliver	1,849	60.7	+5.4
Conservative	George Partis	530	17.3	−9.7
Independent	David Arthur	380	12.4	+12.4
UKIP	Maureen Gallon	304	9.9	+0.2
Majority		1,319	43.1	+14.8
Turnout		3,063	39.7	−28.1
Labour hold		Swing	+7.6	

=== Camperdown ===
Camperdown
Party	Candidate	Votes	%	±%
Labour	Jim Allan	1,457	58.6	−5.5
Independent	Paul Bunyan	790	31.8	+31.8
Conservative	David Sarin	240	9.7	−7.7
Majority		667	26.8	−18
Turnout		2,487	31.8	−25.4
Labour hold		Swing	-18.7	

=== Chirton ===
Chirton
Party	Candidate	Votes	%	±%
Labour	John Stirling	1,270	61.5	−2.4
UKIP	Norman Morse	581	28.1	+6.5
Conservative	Yasmin West	213	10.3	−4.2
Majority		689	33.4	−8.9
Turnout		2,064	26.1	−3.5
Labour hold		Swing	-4.5	

=== Collingwood ===
Collingwood
Party	Candidate	Votes	%	±%
Labour	Debbie Cox	1,463	51.6	+2.8
Conservative	Lewis Austin	779	27.5	−1.9
UKIP	Sylvia Simpson	546	19.2	+0.9
TUSC	David Taws	49	1.7	−0.2
Majority		684	24.1	+4.7
Turnout		2,837	34.5	−27.8
Labour hold		Swing	+2.4	

=== Cullercoats ===
Cullercoats
Party	Candidate	Votes	%	±%
Labour	Karen Lee-Duffy	1,897	49.9	+10.2
Conservative	George Westwater	1,526	40.2	+0.9
UKIP	Phyl Masters	375	9.9	−3.1
Majority		371	9.8	+9.4
Turnout		3,798	50.5	−23.2
Labour gain from Conservative		Swing	+4.7	

=== Howdon ===
Howdon
Party	Candidate	Votes	%	±%
Labour	John Hunter	1,562	70.1	+2.8
UKIP	Robert Mather	446	20	−0.3
Conservative	David Griffith-Owen	155	6.9	−3.2
TUSC	Timothy Wall	69	3.1	+3.1
Majority		1,119	50.1	+3.1
Turnout		2,232	28.4	−24.4
Labour hold		Swing	+1.6	

=== Killingworth ===
Killingworth
Party	Candidate	Votes	%	±%
Labour	Gary Bell	1,791	66.6	+9
UKIP	Brian Needham	459	17.1	−9.9
Conservative	Karen Johnston	441	16.4	+1
Majority		1,332	49.4	+18.8
Turnout		2,691	32.8	−29.1
Labour hold		Swing	+9.5	

=== Longbenton ===
Longbenton
Party	Candidate	Votes	%	±%
Labour	Eddie Darke	2,087	81.7	+19.6
Conservative	Robin Underwood	468	18.3	+2.4
Majority		1,619	63.4	+18.3
Turnout		2,555	31.1	−27.2
Labour hold		Swing	+8.6	

=== Monkseaton North ===
Monkseaton North
Party	Candidate	Votes	%	±%
Conservative	Alison Austin	1,507	46.1	+3.4
Labour	Willie Samuel	1,313	40.2	+5.2
UKIP	Stephen Borlos	245	7.5	−1.1
Liberal Democrats	David Nisbet	205	6.2	+0.8
Majority		194	5.9	−1.8
Turnout		3,270	47.4	−28.4
Conservative hold		Swing	-0.9	

=== Monkseaton South ===
Monkseaton South
Party	Candidate	Votes	%	±%
Labour	Naomi Craven	1,351	40	−2
Conservative	Sean Brockbank	1,317	39	+2.9
UKIP	Gary Legg	444	13.1	−2
Green	Julia Erskine	268	7.9	+1.2
Majority		34	1	−4.9
Turnout		3,380	45.1	−26.1
Labour hold		Swing	-2.5	

=== Northumberland ===
Northumberland
Party	Candidate	Votes	%	±%
Liberal Democrats	Nigel Huscroft	1,217	52	+22
Labour	Joe Kirwin	988	42.2	−2.7
Conservative	Miriam Smith	137	5.8	−2
Majority		229	9.8	−5.3
Turnout		2,342	35.5	−23.5
Liberal Democrats hold		Swing	+12.4	

=== Preston ===
Preston
Party	Candidate	Votes	%	±%
Labour	Catherine Davis	1,402	49.5	+1.1
Conservative	Glynis Barrie	1,085	38.3	+0.2
UKIP	Sheena Patterson	347	12.2	−1.4
Majority		317	11.2	+0.9
Turnout		2,834	42.8	−26.7
Labour hold		Swing	+0.5	

=== Riverside ===
Riverside
Party	Candidate	Votes	%	±%
Labour	Frank Lott	1,411	66.5	+3.2
UKIP	Neil Mather	470	22.2	+1.6
Conservative	Maureen Jeffrey	240	11.3	−4.6
Majority		941	44.4	+1.7
Turnout		2,121	26.2	−25.4
Labour hold		Swing	+0.8	

=== St. Mary's ===
St. Mary's
Party	Candidate	Votes	%	±%
Conservative	Judith Wallace	2,383	65.7	+7.3
Labour	Theresa Maltman	904	24.9	−4.2
UKIP	Hugh Jackson	339	9.3	+3.2
Majority		1,479	40.8	+11.5
Turnout		3,626	52.7	−26.6
Conservative hold		Swing	+5.8	

=== Tynemouth ===
Tynemouth
Party	Candidate	Votes	%	±%
Labour	Frances Weetman	1,563	40.8	−6.2
Conservative	David Lilly	1,402	36.5	−5.8
Independent	Jean McLaughlin	570	14.9	+14.9
UKIP	Henry Marshall	301	7.8	−2.9
Majority		161	4.2	−0.5
Turnout		3,835	45.7	−26.1
Labour gain from Conservative		Swing	-0.2	

=== Valley ===
Valley
Party	Candidate	Votes	%	±%
Labour	Tommy Mulvenna	1,501	63.8	+4.1
UKIP	Elizabeth Borlos	476	20.2	+1.9
Conservative	Joseph Furness	376	16	−6.1
Majority		1,025	43.6	+6
Turnout		2,353	27.8	−31.5
Labour hold		Swing	+1.1	

=== Wallsend ===
Wallsend
Party	Candidate	Votes	%	±%
Labour	Gary Madden	1,144	46.3	−1.8
Liberal Democrats	Margaret Finlay	950	38.4	+7.1
UKIP	Jean McEachan	275	11.1	−2.5
Conservative	Claire Griffith-Owen	101	4.1	−2.9
Majority		194	7.9	−9
Turnout		2,470	31.5	−25.7
Labour hold		Swing	-8.9	

=== Weetslade ===
Weetslade
Party	Candidate	Votes	%	±%
Labour	Anthony McMullen	1,577	54.1	+0.4
Conservative	Andrew Elliott	731	25.1	−0.8
UKIP	Irene Davidson	608	20.9	−0.5
Majority		846	29	+11.2
Turnout		2,916	37.3	−27.4
Labour hold		Swing	+0.6	

=== Whitley Bay ===
Whitley Bay
Party	Candidate	Votes	%	±%
Labour	Sandra Graham	1,792	59.8	+2.9
Conservative	Frank Austin	822	27.4	−5.6
UKIP	David Cory	242	8.1	−2
Liberal Democrats	Colin Finlay	140	4.7	+4.7
Majority		970	32.4	+8.5
Turnout		2,996	41.2	−27.1
Labour hold		Swing	+4.3	
