= 2021 North Tyneside Metropolitan Borough Council election =

2021 UK local government election

Map showing the results of the 2021 North Tyneside Metropolitan Borough Council election

The 2021 North Tyneside Metropolitan Borough Council election took place on 6 May 2021 to elect members of North Tyneside Metropolitan Borough Council in England. This was on the same day as the 2021 United Kingdom local elections. One third of the seats, one in each of the twenty three-member wards, were up for election, with three wards (Chirton, Preston and St Mary's) electing two councillors.

== Results summary ==
2021 North Tyneside Metropolitan Borough Council election
Party	This election			Full council			This election		
Party	Seats	Net	Seats %	Other	Total	Total %	Votes	Votes %	+/−
Labour	18	▼1	78.3	32	50	84.7	33,596	48.6	-0.5
Conservative	5	▲2	21.7	4	9	15.3	24,652	35.7	+8.6
Green	0	Steady	0.0	0	0	0.0	4,889	7.1	+2.2
Liberal Democrats	0	▼1	0.0	0	0	0.0	4,314	6.2	+4.5
TUSC	0	Steady	0.0	0	0	0.0	622	0.9	New
UKIP	0	Steady	0.0	0	0	0.0	601	0.9	-15.8
Independent	0	Steady	0.0	0	0	0.0	303	0.4	-0.2
Reform UK	0	Steady	0.0	0	0	0.0	152	0.2	New

== Ward results ==
=== Battle Hill ===
Battle Hill
Party	Candidate	Votes	%	±%
Labour	Carl Johnson	1,756	59.5	
Conservative	Ian McAlpine	858	29.1	
Liberal Democrats	Anil Valivel Antony	223	7.6	
TUSC	Brian Toft	112	3.8	
Majority		898		
Turnout		4432	37.1	
Labour hold		Swing		

=== Benton ===
Benton
Party	Candidate	Votes	%	±%
Labour	Pat Oliver	1,781	53.2	−10.3%
Conservative	George Partis	764	22.8	−0.1%
Independent	David Arthur	303	9.1	New
Liberal Democrats	Jed Beyer	252	7.5	New
Green	Allie Wilson	246	7.4	New
Majority		1,017	30.4%	−10.2%
Turnout		3,346	43.4	+4.8
Labour hold		Swing		

=== Camperdown ===
Camperdown
Party	Candidate	Votes	%	±%
Labour	Jim Allan	1,575	67.9	+8.4
Conservative	Dennis Smith	746	32.1	+9.2
Majority		829	35.8	
Turnout		2,321	29.8	+2.3
Labour hold		Swing		

=== Chirton ===
Chirton
Party	Candidate	Votes	%	±%
Labour	Hannah Johnson	1,079	60.5	
Labour	John Stirling	883	49.5	
Conservative	Stephen Bones	583	32.7	
Conservative	David Lilly	382	21.4	
TUSC	Graeme Cansdale	275	15.4	
Green	Nicholas Fitzsimons	218	12.2	
UKIP	Jack Thompson	146	8.2	
Majority				
Turnout			28.9	
Labour hold				
Labour hold				

=== Collingwood ===
Collingwood
Party	Candidate	Votes	%	±%
Labour	Debbie Cox	1,409	49.6	
Conservative	Lewis James Austin	1,200	42.3	
Green	David Revett	231	8.1	
Majority		209	7.3	
Turnout		2,840	34.6	
Labour hold		Swing		

=== Cullercoats ===
Cullercoats
Party	Candidate	Votes	%	±%
Conservative	Linda Arkley	1,759	45.7	
Labour	Karen Lee	1,618	42.0	
Green	Helen Bell	270	7.0	
Liberal Democrats	Tracey Pollard	120	3.1	
TUSC	John Hoare	86	2.2	
Majority		141	3.7	N/A
Turnout		3,853	51.5	
Conservative gain from Labour		Swing		

=== Howdon ===
Howdon
Party	Candidate	Votes	%	±%
Labour	John Hunter	1,464	62.2	
Conservative	Robert White	518	22.0	
Green	Thomas Johnson	213	9.0	
UKIP	Jamie Baker	159	6.8	
Majority				
Turnout			30.1	
Labour hold		Swing		

=== Killingworth ===
Killingworth
Party	Candidate	Votes	%	±%
Labour	Gary Bell	1,692	53.0	
Conservative	John Ord	1,153	36.1	
Liberal Democrats	Nathan Shone	350	11.0	
Majority				
Turnout		3,195	35.8	
Labour hold		Swing		

=== Longbenton ===
Longbenton
Party	Candidate	Votes	%	±%
Labour	Eddie Darke	1,768	65.0	
Conservative	Ian Jones	631	23.2	
Green	Steve Manchee	319	11.7	
Majority				
Turnout		2,718	32.7	
Labour hold		Swing		

=== Monkseaton North ===
Monkseaton North
Party	Candidate	Votes	%	±%
Labour	Jane Shaw	1,967	52.0	
Conservative	Neil Graham	1,396	36.9	
Green	Ian Appleby	239	6.3	
Liberal Democrats	David Nisbet	183	4.8	
Majority		571		
Turnout			55.1	
Labour gain from Conservative		Swing		

=== Monkseaton South ===
Monkseaton South
Party	Candidate	Votes	%	±%
Labour	Naomi Craven	1,665	44.8	
Conservative	Stewart Hay	1,620	43.6	
Green	Neil Percival	253	6.8	
Liberal Democrats	Harriet Stanaway	177	4.8	
Majority		45	1.2	
Turnout		3715	49.6	+4.9
Labour hold		Swing		

=== Northumberland ===
Northumberland
Party	Candidate	Votes	%	±%
Labour	Jim Montague	1,073	43.9	
Liberal Democrats	Nigel Huscroft	889	36.4	
Conservative	Miriam Smith	483	19.8	
Majority				
Turnout		2,445	33.9	
Labour gain from Liberal Democrats		Swing		

=== Preston ===
Preston
Party	Candidate	Votes	%	±%
Conservative	Liam Bones	1,537	53.4	
Labour	Cath Davis	1,474	51.3	
Labour	Helen Smith	1,173	40.8	
Conservative	Trish Gargett	1,087	37.8	
Green	Rob Wylie	370	12.9	
UKIP	Hugh Jackson	110	3.8	
Majority				
Turnout			50.5	
Conservative gain from Labour				
Labour hold				

=== Riverside ===
Riverside
Party	Candidate	Votes	%	±%
Labour	Frank Lott	1,350	55.6	
Conservative	Maureen Jeffrey	645	26.5	
Green	Nick Martin	217	8.9	
UKIP	Henry Marshall	119	4.9	
TUSC	William Jarrett	99	4.1	
Majority				
Turnout			29.9	
Labour hold		Swing		

=== St. Mary's ===
St. Mary's
Party	Candidate	Votes	%	±%
Conservative	Judith Wallace	2,476	69.4	
Conservative	George Westwater	1,810	50.7	
Labour	Grant Morris	1,079	30.2	
Labour	Martin Murphy	1,020	28.6	
Liberal Democrats	Janet Appleby	386	10.8	
Green	Kate Percival	364	10.2	
Majority				
Turnout			56.4	
Conservative hold				
Conservative hold				

=== Tynemouth ===
Tynemouth
Party	Candidate	Votes	%	±%
Conservative	Christopher Johnston	1,879	43.9	
Labour	Tricia Neira	1,774	41.5	
Green	Sophie McGlinn	439	10.3	
Liberal Democrats	Annabel Pollard	184	4.3	
Majority				
Turnout		4,276	52.1	
Conservative gain from Labour		Swing		

=== Valley ===
Valley
Party	Candidate	Votes	%	±%
Labour	Tommy Mulvenna	1,825	57.7	
Conservative	Julian Pratt	879	27.8	
Green	Roger Maier	307	9.7	
Reform UK	Gordon Fletcher	152	4.8	
Majority				
Turnout		3,163	31.8	
Labour hold		Swing		

=== Wallsend ===
Wallsend
Party	Candidate	Votes	%	±%
Labour	Gary Madden	1,269	51.8	
Liberal Democrats	Margaret Finlay	535	21.8	
Conservative	Kristen Housman	455	18.6	
Green	Judy Seymour	192	7.8	
Majority				
Turnout			32.2	
Labour hold		Swing		

=== Weetslade ===
Weetslade
Party	Candidate	Votes	%	±%
Labour	Anthony McMullen	1,302	40.2	
Conservative	Robin Underwood	1,044	32.2	
Liberal Democrats	Daniel Elsom	829	25.6	
UKIP	Pamela Hood	67	2.1	
Majority				
Turnout		3,242	40.6	
Labour hold		Swing		

=== Whitley Bay ===
Whitley Bay
Party	Candidate	Votes	%	±%
Labour	Sandra Graham	1,600	44.5	−9.2
Green	Alan Steele	1,011	28.1	+14.5
Conservative	Stephen Mack	747	20.8	+2.0
Liberal Democrats	John Appleby	186	5.1	−1.6
TUSC	Gordon Bell	50	1.3	New
Majority		589	16.3	
Turnout			49.5	+7.5
Labour hold		Swing		

== By-elections ==
=== Camperdown ===
Camperdown: 9 September 2021
Party	Candidate	Votes	%	±%
Labour	Tracy Hallway	957	66.7	−1.2
Conservative	David Lilly	352	24.5	−7.6
Green	Martin Collins	78	5.4	New
Liberal Democrats	Nathan Shone	48	3.3	New
Majority		605	42.2	
Turnout		1,435		
Labour hold		Swing	▲3.2	
