= Greater London Council =

English local administrative body (1965–1986)

- Coat of arms

Type
- Type: Unicameral

History
- Established: 1 April 1965
- Disbanded: 31 March 1986
- Preceded by: London County Council
- Succeeded by: Greater London Authority (2000) (Note: Prior to the establishment of the Greater London Authority, the Greater London Council was succeeded by various local authorities of London, including –: Inner London Education Authority; London Boroughs Grants Committee; London Fire and Civil Defence Authority; London Planning Advisory Committee; London Regional Transport; London Research Centre)

Structure
- Seats: Electoral divisions
- Councillors: 100 (1965–1973); 92 (1973–1986)
- Aldermen: 16 (1965–1973); 15 (1973–1977)

Elections
- First election: 9 April 1964
- Last election: 7 May 1981

Meeting place
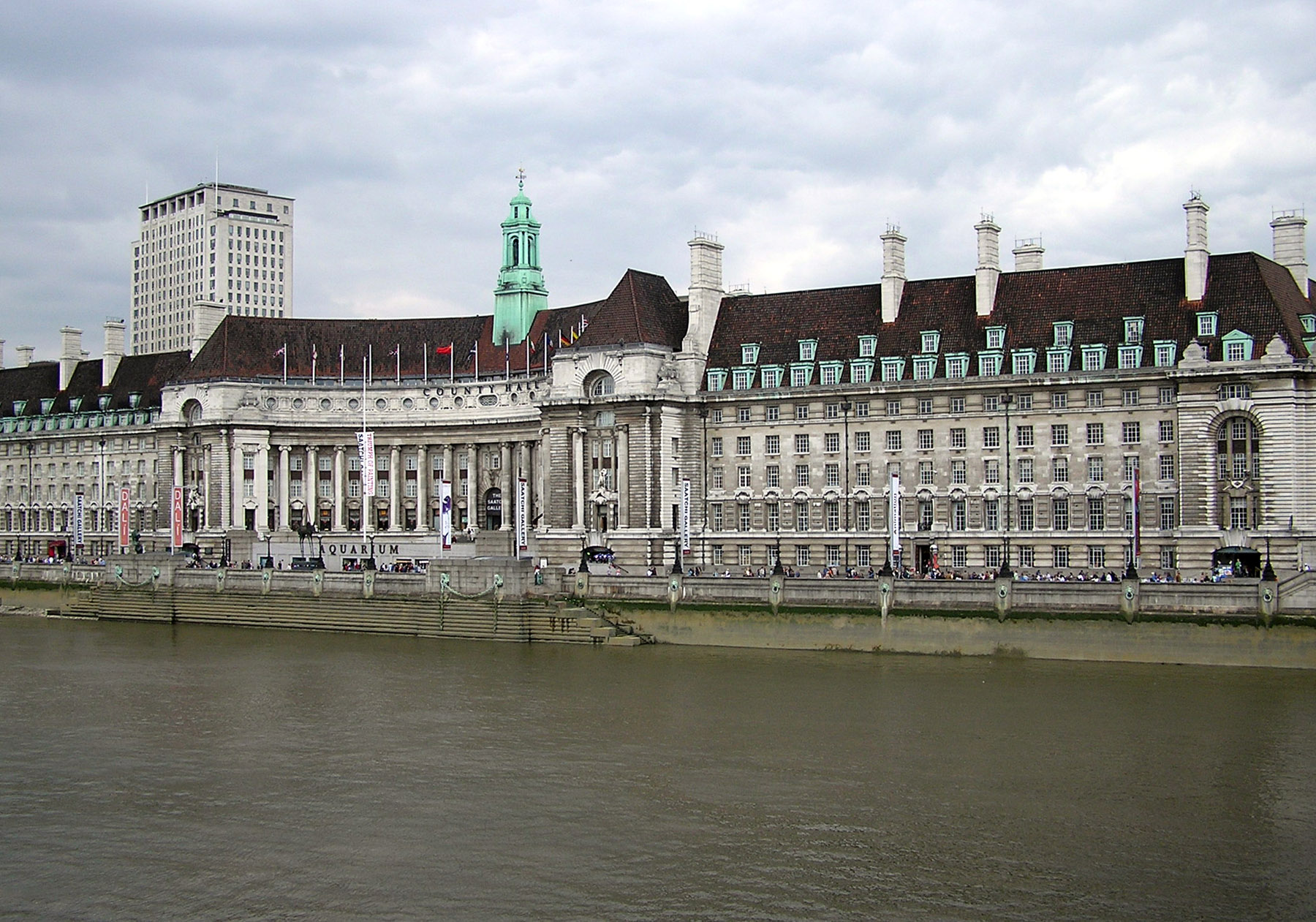
- County Hall, Lambeth which was the headquarters of the GLC

The Greater London Council (GLC) was the top-tier local government administrative body for Greater London from 1965 to 1986. It replaced the earlier London County Council (LCC) which had covered a much smaller area. The GLC was dissolved in 1986 by the Local Government Act 1985 and its powers were devolved to the London boroughs and other entities. A new administrative body, known as the Greater London Authority (GLA), was established in 2000.

== Background ==
In 1957 a Royal Commission on Local Government in Greater London had been set up under Sir Edwin Herbert to consider the local government arrangements in the London area.

It reported in 1960, recommending the creation of 52 new London boroughs as the basis for local government. It further recommended that the LCC be replaced by a weaker strategic authority, with responsibility for public transport, road schemes, housing development and regeneration. The Greater London Group, a research centre of academics within the London School of Economics, also had a significant effort on the commission's report and the eventual creation of the GLC.

Most of the commission's recommendations were accepted, but the number of new boroughs was reduced to 32. Greater London covered the whole County of London and most of Middlesex, plus parts of Essex, Kent, and Surrey, a small part of Hertfordshire and the independent county boroughs of Croydon (geographically in Surrey) and East Ham and West Ham (both in Essex).

Some areas on the boundaries of the area recommended by the Herbert Commission, fearing increased local taxation, fought successfully not to come under the new Greater London Council, notably the urban districts of Chigwell in Essex; and Sunbury-on-Thames, Staines and Potters Bar in Middlesex. Other areas recommended for inclusion that were never part of Greater London included Epsom and Ewell, Caterham and Warlingham, Esher, and Weybridge.

The first election for the new Greater London Council took place on 9 April 1964, and the old London County Council was abolished the following year.

== Creation ==
The GLC was established on 1 April 1965 by the London Government Act 1963, which sought to create a new body covering more of London rather than just the inner part of the conurbation, additionally including and empowering newly created London boroughs within the overall administrative structure.

Within the new Greater London administrative area the council replaced Essex County Council, Hertfordshire County Council, Kent County Council, London County Council, Middlesex County Council and the councils of the county boroughs of Croydon, East Ham and West Ham.

GLC councillors elected for Inner London electoral divisions (the former County of London) became ex officio members of the new Inner London Education Authority, which took over the LCC responsibility for education. By contrast in Outer London, which was the rest of Greater London, the 20 London borough councils each became a local education authority, akin to a county council or county borough in the rest of England.

== Powers ==
The GLC was responsible for running strategic services such as the fire service, emergency planning, waste disposal and flood prevention. The GLC shared responsibility with the London boroughs for providing roads, housing, city planning and leisure services. It had a very limited role in direct service provision with most functions the responsibility of the London boroughs. The GLC did not take control of public transport from the London Transport Board until 1970 and lost control to London Regional Transport in 1984. Under the 1963 Act, the GLC was required to produce a Greater London Development Plan. The plan included in its wide-ranging remit: population changes, employment, housing, pollution, transport, roads, the central area, growth and development areas, urban open spaces and the urban landscape, public services and utilities and planning standards. The plan included the comprehensive redevelopment of Covent Garden and creating a central London motorway loop. The plan was subject to an Inquiry which lasted from July 1970 until May 1972. The campaign to save Covent Garden along with various opposition on other matters largely derailed the plan.

According to one observer:

Looked at from the angle of the GLC... it is useful to consider planning, highways, and traffic together, not only because of the links between them but also because, apart from housing, most other functions of the GLC although important in themselves, do not add up to an argument for a large authority of this type. The GLC is a strategic planning authority, taken in the widest sense, or it is nothing.

== Composition and political control ==
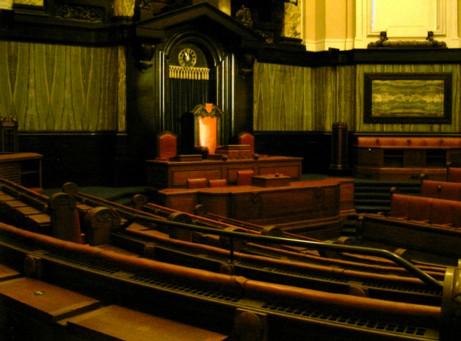
Council Chamber of the GLC, from the majority benches

Each of the six GLC elections was won by the leading national opposition party, with the party in government nationally coming second in the GLC elections.

The first GLC election was on 9 April 1964. Electoral areas based on the new boroughs returned a number of representatives under the bloc vote system. Despite Conservative hopes, the first GLC consisted of 64 Labour and 36 Conservative councillors and Labour Group leader Bill Fiske became the first Leader of the council.

At the next election in 1967 the unpopularity of the national Labour government produced a massive Conservative victory with 82 seats, to Labour's 18. Desmond Plummer became the first Conservative leader of London-wide government in 33 years. The Conservatives retained control in 1970 with a reduced majority.

In 1972 the electoral system was reformed to introduce single-member constituencies for the election after the 1973 contest, and extend the term of office to four years. Labour fought the 1973 election on a strongly socialist platform and won with 58 seats to 32 for the Conservatives. The Liberals won two seats.

The GLC's hopes under the Labour administration of Reg Goodwin were badly affected by the oil crisis of 1974. Massive inflation, combined with the GLC's £1.6 billion debt, led to heavy rate increases (200% in total before the next election in 1977) and unpopular budget cuts. Some months before the 1977 elections the Labour Group began to split. A left group, including Ken Livingstone, denounced the election manifesto of the party.

The Conservatives regained control in May 1977, winning 64 seats under their new Thatcherite leader Horace Cutler against a Labour total of just 28. Cutler headed a resolutely right-wing administration, cutting spending, selling council housing and deprioritising London Transport. In opposition the Labour Party continued to fractionalise: Goodwin resigned suddenly in 1980 and in the following leadership contest the little-regarded left-winger Ken Livingstone was only just beaten in an intensely tactical campaign by the moderate Andrew McIntosh. However, the Labour left were strong at constituency level and as the 1981 election approached they worked to ensure that their members were selected to stand and that their democratic socialist anti-austerity convictions shaped the manifesto.

The May 1981 election was presented as a clash of ideologies by the Conservatives – Thatcherism against a "tax high, spend high" Marxist Labour group, claiming that Andrew McIntosh would be deposed by Ken Livingstone after the election. McIntosh and Labour Party leader Michael Foot insisted this was untrue, and Labour won a very narrow victory with a majority of six. At a pre-arranged meeting of the new Councillors the day after the election, the Left faction won a complete victory over the less-organised Labour right. McIntosh lost with 20 votes to 30 for Ken Livingstone. Livingstone, dubbed "Red Ken" by some newspapers, managed to gain the guarded support of the Labour deputy leader Illtyd Harrington and the party Chief Whip and set about his new administration. Livingstone's deputy leader of the GLC from 1985 to 1986 was John McDonnell, future Shadow Chancellor of the Exchequer under Jeremy Corbyn. Livingstone's Technology Director was Mike Cooley who established The Greater London Enterprise Board (GLEB).

=== Elections to the GLC ===
The first election was held on 9 April 1964, a year before the creation of the council. Subsequent elections were held every three years for a three-year term in 1967, 1970 and 1973. The first three elections were for 100 councillors from 32 multi-member constituencies. This was revised to 92 councillors from single-member constituencies from the 1973 election. The electoral cycle was switched to four-yearly in 1976 and those elected in 1973 had their term extended by another year. Elections were held for a four-year term in 1977 and 1981. In 1984 the elections that were due to happen in 1985 were cancelled and those elected in 1981 had their term extended by another year. The results were as follows:

	Overall control	Conservative	Labour	Liberal
1981	Labour	41	50	1
1977	Conservative	64	28	–
1973	Labour	32	58	2
1970	Conservative	65	35	–
1967	Conservative	82	18	–
1964	Labour	36	64	–

=== Aldermanic elections ===
In addition to the councillors, there were aldermen elected by the council at the ratio of one alderman to every six councillors. Initially there were 100 councillors and sixteen aldermen elected by the council. The eight aldermen elected with the fewest votes in 1964 were for a three year term and other eight had a six year term. Eight aldermen were elected for a six year term in 1967 and 1970. In 1973, to coincide with the reduction in the number of councillors to 92, the number of aldermen was reduced to fifteen and seven aldermen were elected by the council that year. In 1976 the post of alderman was abolished, taking effect from the 1977 election. Aldermen elected in 1970 had their term extended to seven years and those elected 1973 had their term shortened to four years.

== Notable schemes ==
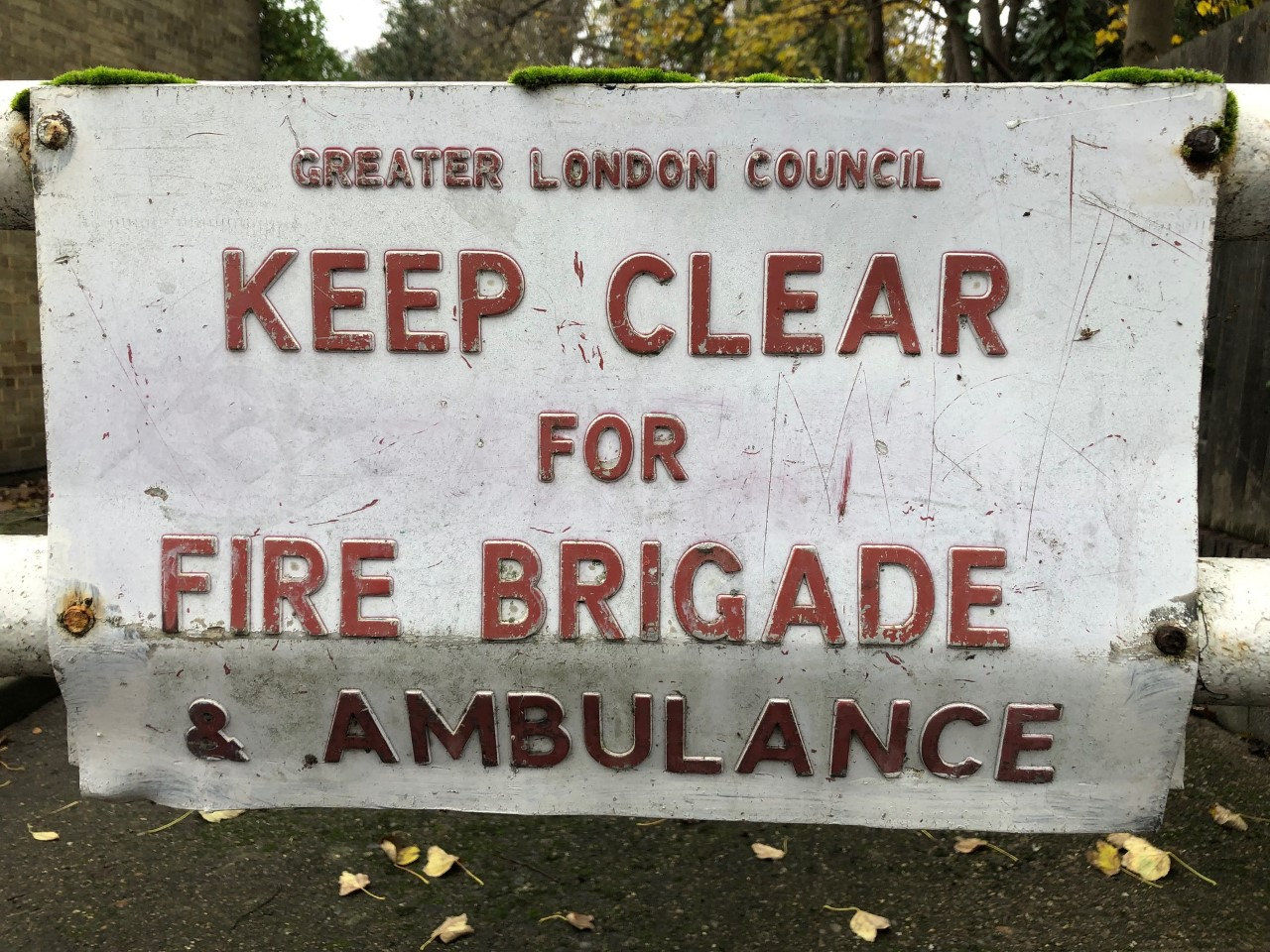
GLC sign on a housing estate in the London Borough of Lewisham as seen in 2022

The most notable and successful scheme of the GLC was the construction of the Thames Barrier that took place between 1974 and 1982 at a cost of £534 million. Some saw it as a GLC vanity project but over time people's opinions have changed: the barrier was used 35 times in the 1990s and was raised 75 times in the first decade of the 21st century, due to rising sea-levels.

In 1969, the GLC announced its plans for the London Ringways which were three motorways that were proposed to solve London's traffic problem once and for all. However, the scheme met with heavy opposition as it would have included the demolition of 30,000 homes. The Westway road scheme was opened in 1970 and hailed as a vision of the future. A review into the planned Ringways took place between 1970 and 1972. It concluded that construction should begin on the controversial Ringway One to relieve congestion in central London, but that the others needed a re-think. The Outer Ringway was given the go-ahead in 1973 and opened in 1986 as the M25 motorway. The remainder of the GLC's Ringway plans were finally killed off in the 1980s due to public opposition. This meant that the capital was left on a much more human scale than it might have been, but also meant that London was left with an eternally unsolved traffic problem.

In 1983, GLC considered investing £230,000 into Lucas rail-bus, which could run on roads and rail tracks. The original concept was developed by Lucas Aerospace workers in the 1970s. In 1980–1981, the workers' combine built a prototype out of a second-hand Bristol bus. The enthusiasm arose from the opportunity to cut costs on rail vehicle production by partially integrating bus parts. Two challenges had to be solved—collision consequences with much heavier rail vehicles and supervision of the transition from road to rail.

After World War II large areas of homes in London remained derelict after being bombed in the war and some housing that remained standing was often squalid and overcrowded. The GLC, with new housing powers, sought to resolve this but the results were mixed: efforts to relocate Londoners from the dilapidated inner-city areas to the suburbs or satellite towns were met with resistance from the residents of those areas. Notable successful housing developments that were built by the GLC include Balfron Tower which was completed in 1967 in Tower Hamlets and Trellick Tower which was completed in 1972 in North Kensington. Both of these buildings are now Grade II* listed.

In addition to the Thames Barrier, other notable successful GLC transport schemes which changed London included the opening of the Blackwall Tunnel second bore and the improvements to the Woolwich Ferry service.

== Abolition ==
Ken Livingstone's socialist policies put the GLC into direct conflict with Margaret Thatcher’s Conservative government. Livingstone soon became a thorn in the side of the Conservative government. He antagonised Thatcher through a series of actions: these included posting a billboard of London's rising unemployment figures on the side of County Hall (directly opposite Parliament), as well as the Fares Fair policy of reducing Tube and bus fares using government subsidies, in which he was defeated in court by Bromley Council, and meeting Sinn Féin MP Gerry Adams at a time when Adams was banned from entering Great Britain due to his links with the Provisional IRA.

By 1983, the government argued for the abolition of the GLC, claiming that it was inefficient and unnecessary and that its functions could be carried out more efficiently by the boroughs. The arguments for this case which were detailed in the White Paper Streamlining the cities. Critics of this position argued that the GLC's abolition (as with that of the metropolitan county councils) was politically motivated, claiming that it had become a powerful vehicle for opposition to Margaret Thatcher's government. Livingstone and three other Labour councillors resigned in protest, and won back their seats easily in the September 1984 by-elections because the Conservatives refused to stand.

The Local Government Act 1985, which abolished the GLC, faced considerable opposition from many quarters but was narrowly passed in Parliament, setting the end of the council for 31 March 1986. It also cancelled the scheduled May 1985 elections. GLC assets were assigned to the London Residuary Body for disposal, including County Hall, which was sold to a Japanese entertainment company and now houses the London Aquarium and the London Dungeon, among other things.

The Inner London Education Authority (ILEA) continued in existence for a few years, and direct elections to it were held but ILEA was finally also disbanded in 1990, with the Inner London boroughs assuming control over education as the outer boroughs had done on their creation in 1965.

== Replacement ==
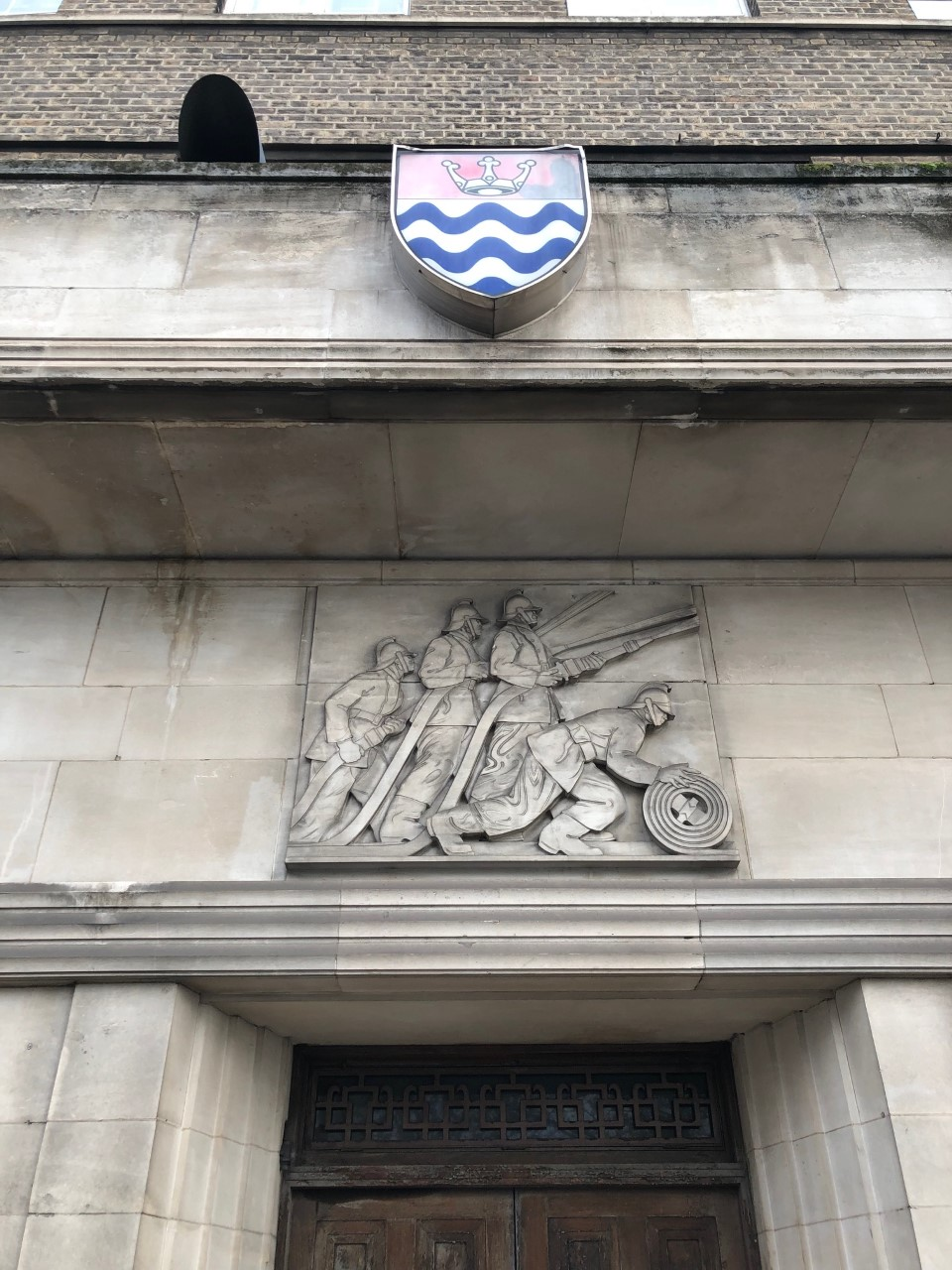
GLC coat of arms on old fire station on Albert Embankment, Lambeth, as seen in 2022

Most of the powers of the GLC were devolved to the London boroughs. Some powers, such as the fire service, were taken over by joint boards made up of councillors appointed by the boroughs – see waste authorities in Greater London for an example. In total, around 100 organisations were responsible for service delivery in Greater London.

Tony Blair's Labour government was elected in 1997, and was committed to bringing back London-wide government. In 1998 a referendum was held on the establishment of a new London authority and elected mayor, which was approved by a two to one margin.

The new Greater London Authority (GLA) was established in 2000 and was effectively a scaled down version of the GLC. The GLA has a different structure to the GLC, consisting of a directly elected Mayor of London and a London Assembly. The Mayor of London elections were won by the same Ken Livingstone, who began his victory speech with the words: "As I was saying before I was so rudely interrupted 14 years ago ...".

In February 2020, Labour's Tom Copley, supported by the Conservatives’ Tony Arbour, both members of the London Assembly, called for the GLC's coat of arms to be adopted by the GLA. In December 2025, the GLA was granted the right to use the GLC coat of arms by the King. The archives of the Greater London Council are held at London Metropolitan Archives.

== Leaders of the GLC ==
No.	Portrait	Leader	Took office	Left office	Party	Constituency
1	Bill Fiske	Bill Fiske (1905–1975)	1964	1967	Labour	Havering
2	Desmond Plummer	Desmond Plummer (1914–2009)	1967	1973	Conservative	Westminster and the City of London
3	Reg Goodwin	Reg Goodwin (1908–1986)	1973	1977	Labour	Bermondsey
4	Horace Cutler	Horace Cutler (1912–1997)	1977	1981	Conservative	Harrow West
5	Ken Livingstone	Ken Livingstone (born 1945)	1981	1986	Labour	Paddington

Ken Livingstone resigned on 2 August 1984, triggering the 1984 Paddington by-election. He was re-elected on 20 September 1984. During this time Ken Livingstone was not a member and John Wilson (Labour, Newham North East) acted as leader of the council.

Timeline

== Committees ==
The political leadership was in the hands of a Leader and a number of committees. Detailed policy proposals in the service areas were set by the committees, with the leadership nominating the Chairs who also had a degree of executive responsibility outside of meetings. The Chairs of the Committees also formed an unofficial Cabinet which advised the Leader on policy and through which the Leader could take political soundings. Formally the committees were divided into Standing Committees and Special Committees. Eventually the cabinet was formed as the 'Leader's Committee' which was a Special Committee.

=== Fiske administration (1964–1967) ===
Committee	Chairman	Date	Notes
Standing Committees
Alexandra Park and Palace	Louis Vitoria	13 June 1966	Set up in 1966.
Ambulance	Florence Cayford	29 May 1964	
Ambulance	George Palmer	22 April 1966	
Establishment and Supplies	Norman Prichard	28 May 1964	Committee abolished, 6 April 1965
Establishment	Sidney Melman	29 April 1965	Set up in 1965.
Finance	Reg Goodwin	2 June 1964	
Fire Brigade	Ellis Garton	29 May 1964	
General Purposes	Victor Mishcon	8 June 1964	
Highways and Traffic	Richard Edmonds	5 June 1964	
Highways and Traffic	Jane Phillips	9 April 1965	
Housing	Evelyn Denington	3 June 1964	
Licensing	Alec Grant	14 April 1965	Set up in 1965.
New and Expanding Towns	Jane Phillips	27 May 1964	
New and Expanding Towns	Richard Edmonds	7 April 1965	
Parks and Smallholdings	Sidney Melman	29 May 1964	
Parks and Smallholdings	Peggy Jay	30 April 1965	
Planning and Communications	Christopher Higgins	2 June 1964	
Public Health Services	Albert Samuels	27 May 1964	
Staff Appeals	Harry Lamborn	4 May 1965	Set up in 1965.
Supplies	Samuel Boyce	4 May 1965	Set up in 1965.
Special Committees
Selection	Bill Fiske	27 April 1964	Nominated members to the other committees.

=== Plummer administration (1967–1973) ===
Committee	Chairman	Date	Notes
Standing Committees
Alexandra Park and Palace	Reginald Marks	2 May 1967	Abolished, 23 July 1968.
Ambulance	Robert Mitchell	28 April 1970	
Ambulance	Andrew Jardine	4 May 1971	
Arts and Recreation	Harold Sebag-Montefiore	23 July 1968	Set up in 1968.
Covent Garden Joint Development	Raine Spencer, Countess Spencer	4 May 1971	Set up in 1971.
Covent Garden Joint Development	Robert Mitchell	13 September 1972	
Environmental Planning	Robert Vigars	28 April 1970	Set up in 1970.
Environmental Planning	Richard Brew	4 May 1971	
Establishment	Sir Graham Rowlandson	2 May 1967	
Establishment	Maurice Gaffney	9 October 1969	
Establishment	Leslie Freeman	28 April 1970	
Finance and Scrutiny	Sir Graham Rowlandson	28 April 1970	Set up in 1970.
Finance and Supplies	Sir Louis Gluckstein	2 May 1967	
Finance and Supplies	Roland Freeman	14 May 1968	
Finance and Supplies	Sir Graham Rowlandson	30 September 1969	Abolished, 28 April 1970.
Fire Brigade	Robert Mitchell	28 April 1970	Set up in 1970.
Fire Brigade	Andrew Jardine	4 May 1971	
Fire Brigade and Ambulance	Robert Mitchell	2 May 1967	Abolished, 23 July 1968.
General Purposes	Leslie Freeman	2 May 1967	
General Purposes	Sir Percy Rugg	12 May 1969	
General Purposes	Frank Abbott	28 April 1970	
General Purposes	Geoffrey Chase-Gardner	7 February 1972	
Highways and Traffic	Robert Vigars	2 May 1967	Abolished, 23 July 1968.
Housing	Horace Cutler	2 May 1967	
Housing	Geoffrey Chase-Gardner	28 April 1970	
Housing	Bernard Perkins	3 February 1972	
Licensing	Harold Sebag-Montefiore	2 May 1967	Abolished, 23 July 1968
New and Expanding Towns	George Everitt	2 May 1967	Abolished, 28 April 1970
Parks and Smallholdings	Gordon Dixon	2 May 1967	Abolished, 28 April 1970
Planning and Communications	Geoffrey Aplin	2 May 1967	
Planning and Communications	Thomas Scott	13 May 1968	Abolished, 23 July 1968
Planning and Transportation	Robert Vigars	23 July 1968	Set up in 1968; abolished, 28 April 1970.
Policy and Resources	Horace Cutler	28 April 1970	Set up in 1970.
Policy Steering	Desmond Plummer	23 July 1968	Set up in 1968; abolished, 28 April 1970.
Public Health Services	Peter Black	2 May 1967	Abolished, 23 July 1968
Public Services	Peter Black	23 July 1968	
Public Services	Maurice Gaffney	28 April 1970	
Public Services	Peter Black	7 June 1971	
Scrutiny	Harold Mote	23 July 1968	Set up in 1968; abolished, 28 April 1970.
Strategic Planning	Dr Gerard Vaughan	23 July 1968	
Strategic Planning	Robert Vigars	4 May 1971	
Thamesmead	Seton Forbes-Cockell	2 May 1967	Died, 19 September 1971
Thamesmead	David Harris	13 October 1971	
Town Development	George Everitt	28 April 1970	
Town Development	Peter Black	4 May 1971	
Town Development	Bernard Brook-Partridge	7 June 1971	
Special Committees
Staff Appeals	Robert Turner	2 May 1967	Died 27 September 1968.
Staff Appeals	Sir Louis Gluckstein	2 May 1969	
Procedure	Desmond Plummer	5 July 1967	Abolished, 28 April 1970.
Leader's Council	Desmond Plummer	23 July 1968	

=== Goodwin administration (1973–1977) ===
Committee	Chairman	Date	Notes
Standing Committees
Ambulance	Tony Judge	4 May 1973	Abolished, 14 May 1974.
Arts and Recreation	Ellis Hillman	4 May 1973	
Covent Garden Joint Development	Tom Ponsonby	4 May 1973	
Covent Garden Joint Development	Jean Merriton	13 May 1975	
Fire Brigade	John Henry	4 May 1973	
General Purposes	Dr Stephen Haseler	4 May 1973	
General Purposes	Tony Banks	13 May 1975	
Housing Administration	Marie Jenkins	4 May 1973	Abolished, 14 May 1974.
Housing Development	Gladys Dimson	4 May 1973	
Housing Development	Richard Balfe	13 May 1975	
Housing Management	Tony Judge	14 May 1974	Set up in 1974.
Planning	Edward Bell	4 May 1973	
Planning	Norman Howard	14 May 1974	
Policy and Resources	Illtyd Harrington	4 May 1973	
Public Services	Arthur Edwards	4 May 1973	
Thamesmead	Richard Balfe	4 May 1973	
Thamesmead	William Simson	13 May 1975	
Town Development	Robert Crane	4 May 1973	
Town Development	Edward Bell	14 May 1974	
Town Development	Stephen Hatch	13 May 1975	
Transport	Evelyn Denington	4 May 1973	
Transport	Jim Daly	13 May 1975	
Special Committees
Leader's Council	Sir Reg Goodwin	4 May 1973	
Staff Appeals	Anna Grieves	4 May 1973	

=== Cutler administration (1977–1981) ===
Committee	Chairman	Date	Notes
Standing Committees
Arts	Bernard Brook-Partridge	24 May 1977	
Arts	Fredk. Weyer	16 May 1978	
Covent Garden	Alan Greengross	24 May 1977	
Covent Garden	Dr Mark Lister Patterson	16 May 1978	
Finance and Establishment	Alan Hardy	24 May 1977	
Fire Brigade	Tom Ham	24 May 1977	
General Management	Geoffrey Seaton	24 May 1977	
Historic Buildings	William Bell	24 May 1977	
Housing Development	Geoffrey Aplin	24 May 1977	
Housing Development	Lawrence Bains	18 June 1979	
Housing Management	Jean Tatham	24 May 1977	
Housing Management	David Ashby	13 February 1979	
Housing Policy	George Tremlett	24 May 1977	
Industry and Employment	Mervyn Scorgie	24 May 1977	
Legal and Parliamentary	James Lemkin	24 May 1977	
Legal and Parliamentary	David Ashby	16 May 1978	
Legal and Parliamentary	John Reveley Major	13 February 1979	
London Transport	Harold Mote	24 May 1977	
London Transport	Dr Gordon Taylor	16 May 1978	
London Transport	Harold Mote	19 December 1979	
Open Spaces and Recreation	Sydney Ripley	24 May 1977	
Planning, Central Area	Herbert Sandford	24 May 1977	
Planning, North Area	William Clack	24 May 1977	
Planning, North Area	Alan Greengross	16 May 1978	
Planning, North Area	John Putnam	18 June 1979	
Planning, South Area	Joan Wykes	24 May 1977	
Planning and Communications Policy	Shelagh Roberts	24 May 1977	
Planning and Communications Policy	Alan Greengross	18 June 1979	
Policy and Resources	Richard Brew	24 May 1977	
Professional and General Services	Robert Mitchell	24 May 1977	
Professional and General Services	Cyril Taylor	18 June 1979	
Public Services and Safety	Dr Gordon Taylor	24 May 1977	
Public Services and Safety	Bernard Brook-Partridge	16 May 1978	
Public Services and Safety	Stanley Bolton	7 February 1979	
Recreation and Community Services Policy	Peter Black	24 May 1977	
Thamesmead	Victor Langton	24 May 1977	
Town Development	Frank Smith	24 May 1977	
Special Committees
Leader's	Horace Cutler	24 May 1977	
Scrutiny	Sir Malby Crofton, Bt.	24 May 1977	
Scrutiny	James Lemkin	16 May 1978	
Staff Appeals	Muriel Gumbel	24 May 1977	
Construction Branch Contracts Review	Horace Cutler	15 May 1979	Set up in 1979.
Local Government Bill	Richard Brew	14 January 1980	Set up in 1980.
Housing Bill	George Tremlett	5 February 1980	Set up in 1980.

=== Livingstone administration (1981–1986) ===
Committee	Chairman	Date	Notes
Standing Committees
Arts and Recreation	Tony Banks	28 May 1981	
Arts and Recreation	Peter Pitt	22 May 1984	
Ethnic Minorities	Ken Livingstone	28 May 1981	
Finance and General Purposes	Dr Anthony Hart	28 May 1981	
Finance and General Purposes	John McDonnell	11 May 1982	Replaced by Michael Ward as Acting Chair, March 1985.
Finance and General Purposes	Alex Mackay	21 May 1985	
Greater London Manpower Board	Gareth Daniel	11 May 1982	Set up in 1982. Renamed Greater London; Training Board, 3 May 1983.
Housing	Gladys Dimson	28 May 1981	
Housing	Anthony McBrearty	11 May 1982	
Industry and Employment	Mike Ward	28 May 1981	
Legal and General	Harvey Hinds	28 May 1981	
Legal and General	John Wilson	3 May 1983	
Planning	Ed Gouge	28 May 1981	
Planning	George Nicholson	3 May 1983	
Police	Paul Boateng	28 May 1981	
Policy and Performance Review	Illtyd Harrington	28 May 1981	
Policy and Performance Review	Harvey Hinds	22 May 1984	Renamed Policy and Performance, 21 May 1985.
Public Services and Fire Brigade	Simon Turney	28 May 1981	
Staff	John Carr	28 May 1981	
Technical Services	Alex Mackay	3 May 1983	Set up in 1983.
Technical Services	Sir Ashley Bramall	21 May 1985	
Transport	Dave Wetzel	28 May 1981	
Women's	Valerie Wise	11 May 1982	Set up in 1982.
Special Committees
Policy Co-ordinating	Ken Livingstone	28 May 1981	
Staff Appeals	Harry Kay	28 May 1981	
Staff Appeals	John Ward	22 May 1984	
Local Government Finance Bill	Ken Livingstone	11 May 1982	Set up in 1982; abolished, 3 May 1983.
Matters relating to the Council's Future Existence and Functions	Ken Livingstone	22 May 1984	Set up in 1984.
Matters relating to the Council's Future Existence and Functions	Illtyd Harrington	21 May 1985	
Policy and Resources	Ken Livingstone	21 May 1985	Set up in 1985.

== See also ==
- History of local government in London
- List of electoral divisions in Greater London
- Members of the Greater London Council
- Greater London Council Staff Association
- Greater London Area War Risk Study
- OXO Tower – controversially sold by the GLC for £750,000 to Coin Street Community Builders in 1984
- GLC: The Carnage Continues... – satire of the GLC politics by The Comic Strip
- Gay Rights Working Party – part of the Greater London Council
