= Glasgow–Dundee line =

Railway line in Scotland

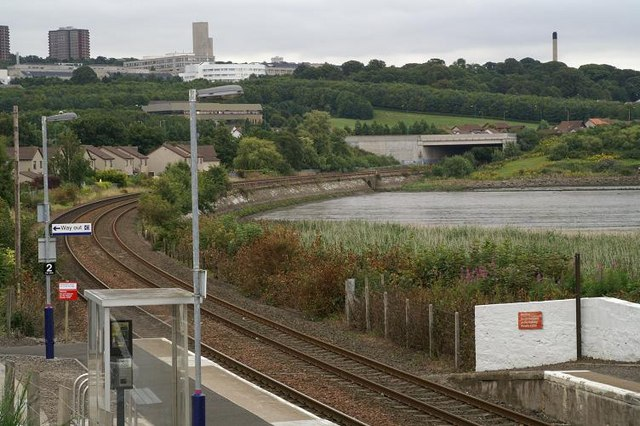
- The railway at Invergowrie near Dundee

Overview
- Status: Operational
- Owner: Network Rail
- Locale: Glasgow; Angus; Scotland
- Termini: Glasgow Queen Street; Dundee
- Stations: 12

Service
- Type: Heavy rail
- System: National Rail
- Operator(s): ScotRail; Caledonian Sleeper; London North Eastern Railway

Technical
- Track gauge: 1,435 mm (4 ft 8 1/2 in) standard gauge
- Operating speed: 100 mph (160 km/h)
Route map
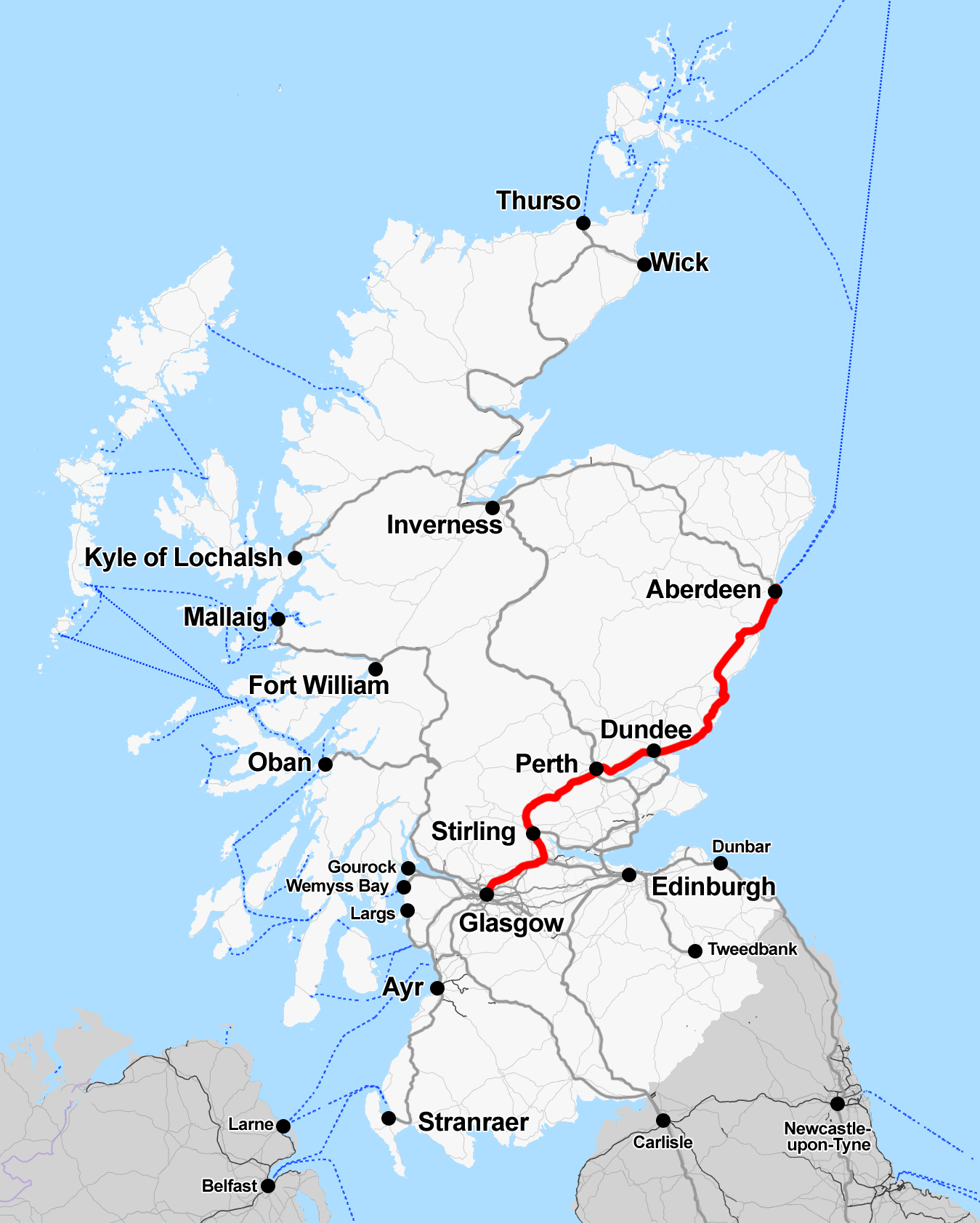

The Glasgow–Dundee line is a railway line linking Glasgow with Dundee via Stirling and Perth.

== Route ==
Most of the route is shared with other services:

- Glasgow–Edinburgh via Falkirk line between Glasgow Queen Street and Greenhill Junction
- Croy Line between Glasgow Queen Street and Dunblane
- Edinburgh–Dunblane line between Larbert and Dunblane

=== Stations ===
Station	Services				Connecting lines
Station	ScotRail	LNER	Caledonian Sleeper	CrossCountry	Connecting lines
Glasgow Queen Street	●		●		
Bishopbriggs	●				
Lenzie	●				
Croy	●				
Larbert	●				
Stirling	●	●	●		Alloa via the Croy Line
Bridge of Allan	●				
Dunblane	●	●	●		
Gleneagles	●	●	●		
Perth	●	●	●		Inverness via the Highland Main Line; Edinburgh via the Edinburgh–Dundee line
Invergowrie	●				
Dundee	●	●	●	●	Aberdeen via the Dundee–Aberdeen line Edinburgh via the Edinburgh–Dundee line

== Historical route ==
The route comprises the following historical railway lines:

- Edinburgh and Glasgow Railway between Glasgow Queen Street and Greenhill Junction (between Croy and Larbert)
- Scottish Central Railway between Greenhill Junction and Perth
- Dundee and Perth Railway between Perth and Dundee

== Services ==
=== From December 2008 ===
There is generally an hourly service throughout the day between Glasgow and Aberdeen. In the May 2016 timetable, there are also a few additional services between Glasgow & Dundee which offer connections at the latter for stations further north.

Three trains work north of Aberdeen as part of the Crossrail project – one each southbound from Inverurie and Dyce and a northbound service to Dyce.

Aberdeen Crossrail has increased the number of services stopping at Dyce with connections for Aberdeen Airport.

=== From December 2018 ===
One hourly service, primarily calling (from Glasgow) at Stirling, Perth, Dundee, Arbroath, Montrose and Aberdeen. Services also call at Dunblane, Gleneagles, Carnoustie and Stonehaven less frequently, primarily at peak and evening times. There are also additional services between Glasgow and Dundee/Arbroath, calling at more intermediate stations. The 14:40 service from Glasgow Queen Street extends to Inverness via Inverurie and Elgin from Monday-Saturday
