= Stonehaven railway station =

Railway station in Aberdeenshire, Scotland

Stonehaven
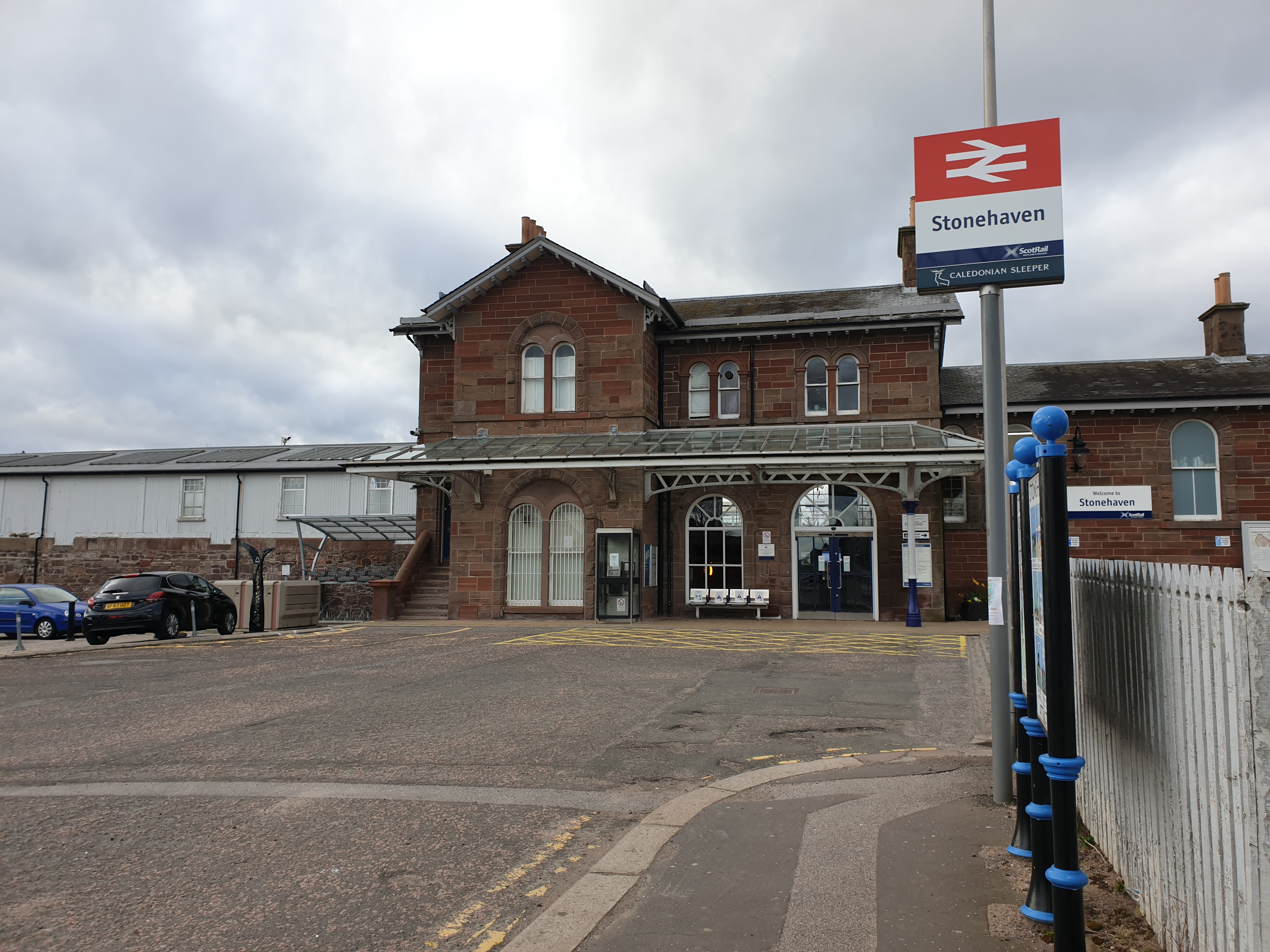

General information
- Location: Stonehaven, Aberdeenshire; Scotland
- Coordinates: 56.9667°N 2.2256°W
- Grid reference: NO863861
- Manager: ScotRail
- Platforms: 2

Other information
- Station code: STN

History
- Original company: Aberdeen Railway
- Pre-grouping: Caledonian Railway
- Post-grouping: LMS

Key dates
- 1 November 1849: Station opened
- late 19th century: modernised & extended

Passengers
- 2020/21: ▼65,246
- 2021/22: ▲0.286 million
- 2022/23: ▲0.360 million
- 2023/24: ▲0.448 million
- 2024/25: ▲0.480 million

Listed Building – Category C(S)
- Designated: 23 March 2006
- Reference no.: LB50270
Location
Notes
- Passenger statistics from the Office of Rail and Road

Stonehaven railway station serves the town of Stonehaven in Aberdeenshire, Scotland, United Kingdom. It is sited 224 miles 74 chains (362.0 kilometres) from Carlisle via Perth, on the Dundee to Aberdeen line, and is situated between Laurencekirk and Portlethen. There is a crossover at the southern end of the station, which can be used to facilitate trains turning back if the line towards Aberdeen is blocked.

== History ==
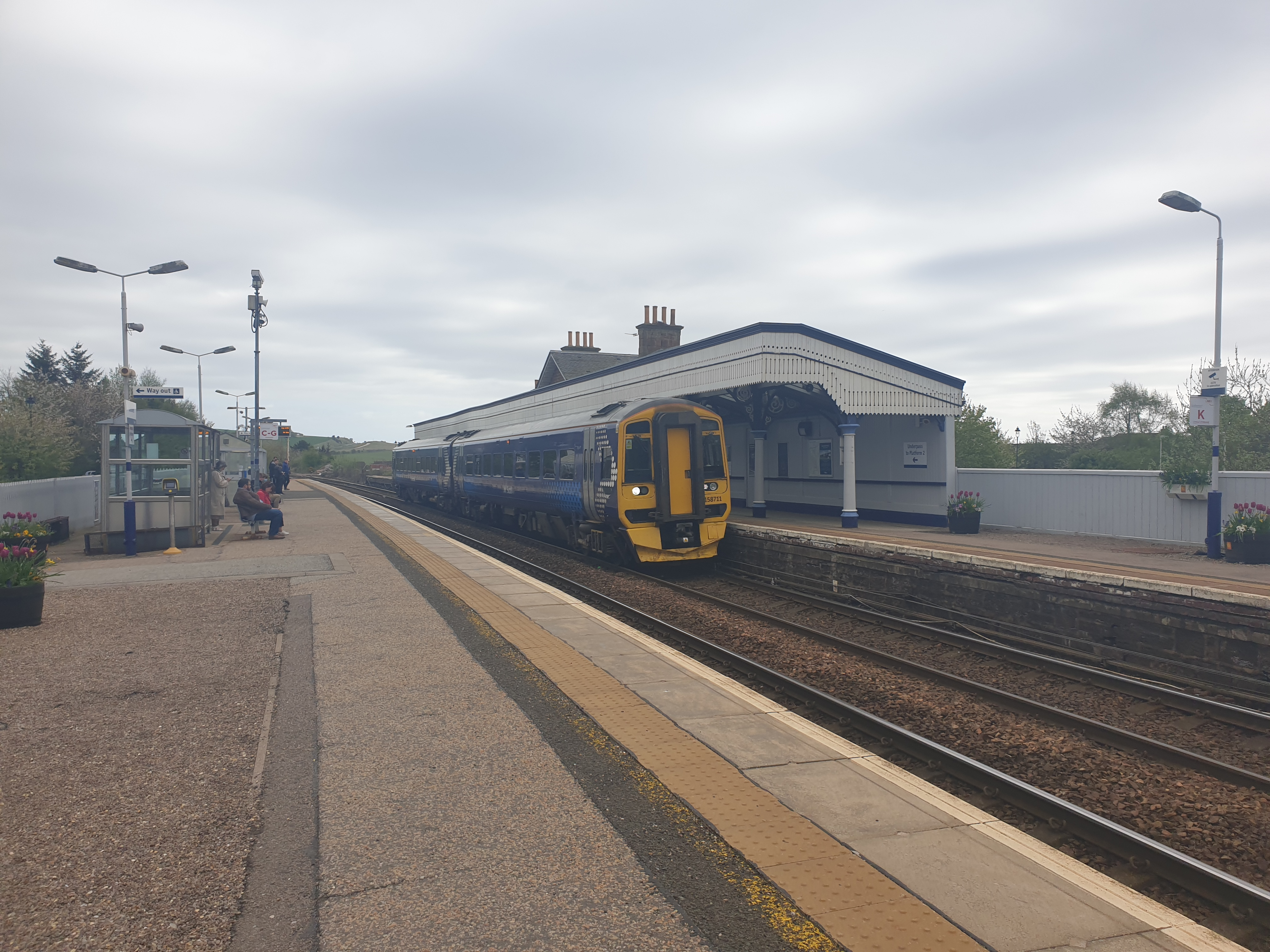
The station seen in 2022

The station was opened as part of the Aberdeen Railway on 1 November 1849. This later became part of the Scottish North Eastern Railway and then the Caledonian Railway. The North British Railway began serving it in 1883, with the opening of the line from Arbroath to Kinnaber Junction via Montrose – this has been the only route south since the closure of the original main line to Perth via Coupar Angus in September 1967.

In 1899, work started to improve the station. The platforms were raised, widened, and extended southward over the bridge to the south of the station. The buildings on the down platform were also replaced.

Stonehaven also has a B listed signal box with a 40 lever Stevens and Sons frame.

=== Accidents and incidents ===
In August 2021, a ScotRail train derailed on a landslip west of the station, near Carmont. Three people were killed and six people were injured. It is the first fatal rail accident in Scotland since the Greenock rail crash in 1994. On 12 August 2021, one year after the derailment occurred, southwest of Stonehaven railway station, a plaque was unveiled dedicated to the three people killed in the derailment.

== Facilities ==
The station is equipped with a ticket office and an accessible toilet on platform 1, with help points, benches and waiting rooms on both platforms, as well as car parks adjacent to both platforms. Platform 2 also has a ticket machine. Both platforms have step-free access to their car parks, but they are linked by a stepped subway.

== Passenger volume ==
Passenger Volume at Stonehaven
	2004–05	2005–06	2006–07	2007–08	2008–09	2009–10	2010–11	2011–12	2012–13	2013–14	2014–15	2015–16	2016–17	2017–18	2018–19	2019–20	2020–21	2021–22	2022–23	2023–24	2024–25
Entries and exits	363,851	397,351	416,175	452,596	466,996	444,822	482,722	502,812	510,412	528,307	534,892	535,698	504,750	522,890	469,616	451,762	65,246	286,176	359,880	448,104	480,362

The statistics cover twelve month periods that start in April.

== Services ==
Trains on both the Edinburgh to Aberdeen Line and the Glasgow to Aberdeen Line call here, though some services to and from Glasgow skip this station outside peak periods. Four London North Eastern Railway services also call each way Mondays - Saturdays (three to/from London King's Cross, the other to/from Leeds), along with the two CrossCountry services between Aberdeen and Plymouth/Edinburgh. The Caledonian Sleeper also operates to London Euston six days per week (not on Saturday nights).

Service frequencies to the station were improved in 2018 as part of a revised timetable funded by Transport Scotland. A new "Aberdeen Crossrail" commuter service was introduced between Montrose and Inverurie, which calls hourly in each direction at Stonehaven (in addition to existing services) and the other intermediate stations.

Preceding station	National Rail	Following station
Montrose	Caledonian Sleeper; Highland Caledonian Sleeper	Aberdeen
Montrose	CrossCountry; Cross Country Route	Aberdeen
Montrose	London North Eastern Railway; East Coast Main Line	Aberdeen
Laurencekirk	ScotRail; Dundee–Aberdeen line	Portlethen
Terminus	ScotRail; Dundee–Aberdeen line	Portlethen
Laurencekirk; To Montrose	ScotRail; Aberdeen Crossrail	Portlethen; To Inverurie
	Historical railways	
Carmont; Line open; Station closed	Caledonian Railway; Aberdeen Railway	Muchalls; Line open; Station closed

== Bibliography ==
- Butt, R. V. J. (October 1995). The Directory of Railway Stations: details every public and private passenger station, halt, platform and stopping place, past and present (1st ed.). Sparkford: Patrick Stephens Ltd. ISBN 978-1-85260-508-7. OCLC 60251199. OL 11956311M.
- Jowett, Alan (March 1989). Jowett's Railway Atlas of Great Britain and Ireland: From Pre-Grouping to the Present Day (1st ed.). Sparkford: Patrick Stephens Ltd. ISBN 978-1-85260-086-0. OCLC 22311137.
- Jowett, Alan (2000). Jowett's Nationalised Railway Atlas (1st ed.). Penryn, Cornwall: Atlantic Transport Publishers. ISBN 978-0-906899-99-1. OCLC 228266687.
- Quick, Michael (2023). Railway Passenger Stations in Great Britain: A Chronology (PDF) (5th ed.). London: Railway and Canal Historical Society.
