= Dyce railway station =

Railway station in Aberdeen, Scotland

Dyce Scottish Gaelic: Deis
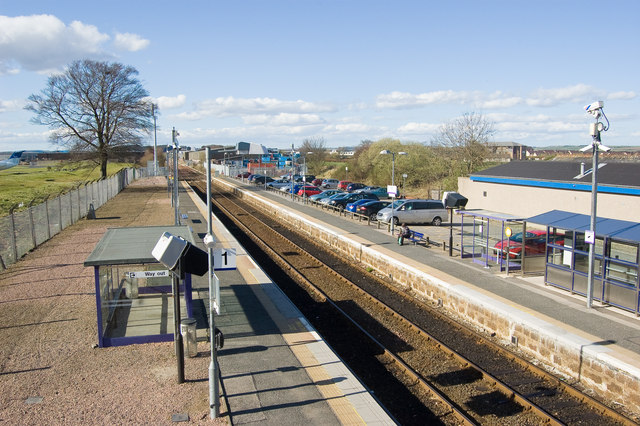
- Dyce Railway Station (2009)

General information
- Location: Dyce, Aberdeen City Council; Scotland
- Coordinates: 57.2056°N 2.1926°W
- Grid reference: NJ884128
- Managed by: ScotRail
- Platforms: 2

Other information
- Station code: DYC

Key dates
- 20 September 1854: Opened
- 6 May 1968: Closed
- 15 September 1984: Reopened

Passengers
- 2020/21: ▼86,520
- 2021/22: ▲0.216 million
- 2022/23: ▲0.260 million
- 2023/24: ▲0.302 million
- 2024/25: ▲0.309 million
Location
Notes
- Passenger statistics from the Office of Rail and Road

Dyce railway station is a railway station serving the suburb of Dyce, Aberdeen, Scotland. The station is managed by ScotRail and is on the Aberdeen to Inverness Line, with some trains operating on the Edinburgh to Aberdeen Line and Glasgow to Aberdeen Line also extended to call at Dyce and Inverurie. It is sited 6.25 miles (10.06 kilometres) from Aberdeen.

== History ==
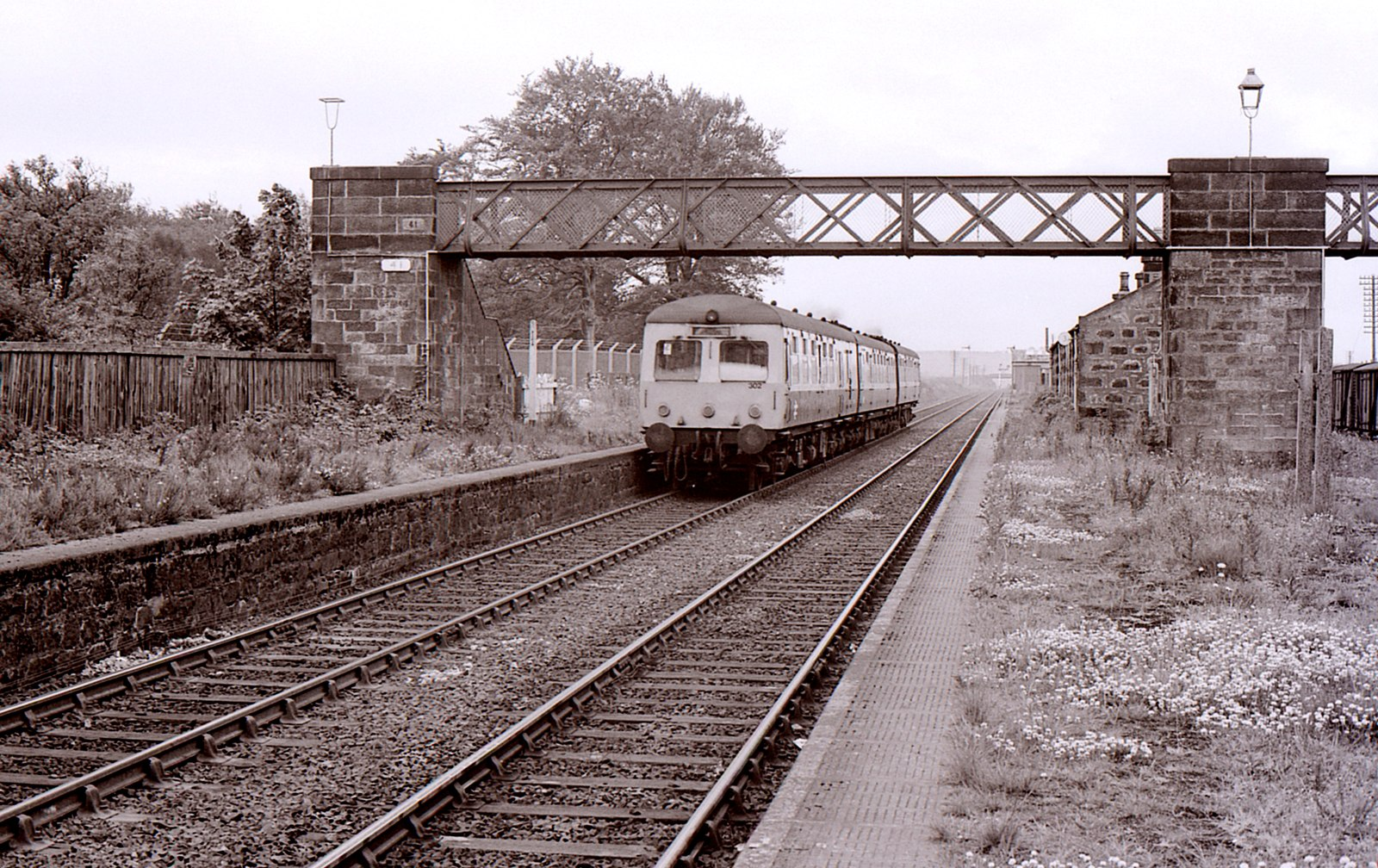
The station seen in 1978

The station here was opened (along with the line) in 1854 by the Great North of Scotland Railway. It later became a junction for the Formartine and Buchan Railway, which diverged here and headed north to Peterhead and Fraserburgh; this opened to traffic in 1861 and had its own platforms alongside the main line ones. Passenger services over both branches ended as a result of the Beeching Axe on 4 October 1965 but the station remained open until 6 May 1968. Freight continued to Peterhead until 1970 and to Fraserburgh until October 1979.

The station was reopened by British Rail on 15 September 1984.

The signal box was demolished in August 2019 as part of upgrades to the Inverness to Aberdeen line that saw the track between Inverurie and Aberdeen doubled.

== Facilities ==
The station has two platforms connected by a new fully accessible footbridge. The station is unstaffed and there is no ticket office, but automatic ticket vending machines are provided. Other facilities include car park, taxi rank, cycle storage, seating and a simple shelter on each platform. Automated announcements, customer help points, timetable posters and train information displays offer running information. Both platforms are fully accessible for disabled passengers, with lifts in the footbridge and level access from the main car park to platform 2.

== Passenger volume ==
Passenger Volume at Dyce
	2004–05	2005–06	2006–07	2007–08	2008–09	2009–10	2010–11	2011–12	2012–13	2013–14	2014–15	2015–16	2016–17	2017–18	2018–19	2019–20	2020–21	2021–22	2022–23	2023–24	2024–25
Entries and exits	269,263	334,731	401,021	453,635	487,972	515,524	579,660	677,860	759,898	810,678	823,866	664,396	517,586	466,700	358,670	356,388	86,520	216,102	260,000	301,878	308,806

The statistics cover twelve month periods that start in April.

== Services ==
As of May 2026, the stations sees approximately 1 train every 2 hours between Aberdeen and Inverness, calling at all stations, as well as a two-hourly shuttle to Montrose. One per day continues to Edinburgh Waverley. There are additional shuttle services between here and Aberdeen to fill gaps in the service, giving 2 or 3 trains per hour between here and Aberdeen. On Sundays, all trains (except one to Glasgow Queen Street) terminate at Aberdeen, making an average of one train every hour in each direction.

The service level was improved in 2018, as part of the Aberdeen Crossrail project, which saw the introduction of hourly services from Inverurie to Montrose, as well as half hourly trains between Inverurie and Aberdeen, requiring the track to be redoubled.

Preceding station	National Rail	Following station
Aberdeen	ScotRail; Aberdeen to Inverness Line	Kintore
Aberdeen; Towards Montrose	ScotRail; Aberdeen Crossrail	Kintore; Towards Inverurie
	Historical railways	
Stoneywood; Line open; station closed	Great North of Scotland Railway; GNoSR Main Line	Pitmedden; Line open; station closed
Terminus	Great North of Scotland Railway; Formartine and Buchan Railway	Parkhill; Line closed; station closed

== Connections ==
Until May 2017 Stagecoach Bluebird's operated an 80 Jet Connect bus shuttle service between Dyce station and Aberdeen Airport, but this service was discontinued due to low passenger numbers. In 2019, First Aberdeen launched its X27 service which connects the railway station to the airport, heliports, and the P&J Live.
