= Portlethen railway station =

Railway station in Aberdeenshire, Scotland

Portlethen Scottish Gaelic: Port Leathain
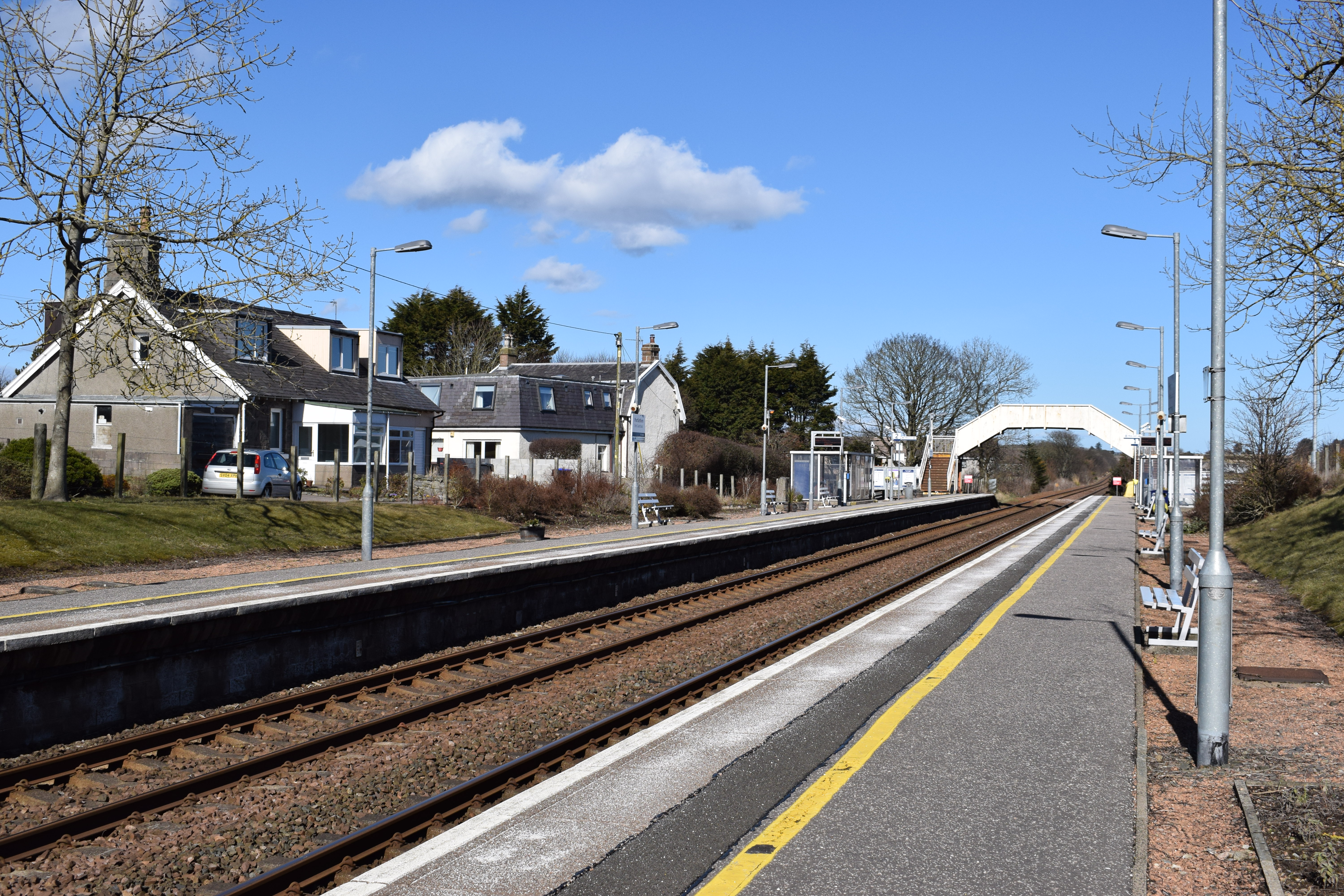

General information
- Location: Portlethen, Aberdeenshire; Scotland
- Coordinates: 57.0614°N 2.1280°W
- Grid reference: NO923967
- Managed by: ScotRail
- Platforms: 2

Other information
- Station code: PLN

Key dates
- 1 April 1850: Opened
- 11 June 1956: Closed
- 17 May 1985: Reopened

Passengers
- 2020/21: ▼14,210
- 2021/22: ▲41,480
- 2022/23: ▲48,446
- 2023/24: ▲69,038
- 2024/25: ▼68,214
Location
Notes
- Passenger statistics from the Office of Rail and Road

Portlethen railway station serves the town of Portlethen in Aberdeenshire, Scotland. It is sited 232 miles 59 chains (374.6 km) from Carlisle via Perth, and is between Stonehaven and Aberdeen, on the Dundee to Aberdeen line.

== History ==
The station was opened on 1 February 1850. After closure on 11 June 1956, the station was reopened nearly 30 years later on 17 May 1985.

In 2021, an investigation was started after trains went through an emergency speed restriction near the station close to line speed.

== Facilities ==
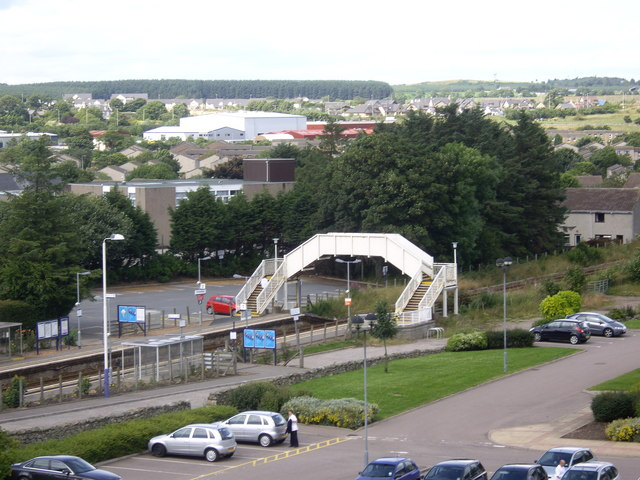
Overview of the station, July 2009

Unstaffed, the facilities at the station are minimal, consisting of two car parks (and sets of bike racks), and shelters and benches on each platform. There is, however, step-free access to and between the platforms (the latter via Cookston Road). There is a ticket machine in shelter on platform 2.

== Passenger volume ==
Passenger Volume at Portlethen
	2004–05	2005–06	2006–07	2007–08	2008–09	2009–10	2010–11	2011–12	2012–13	2013–14	2014–15	2015–16	2016–17	2017–18	2018–19	2019–20	2020–21	2021–22	2022–23	2023–24	2024–25
Entries and exits	10,722	14,887	21,073	22,055	19,906	15,186	18,382	19,076	28,000	48,174	57,152	56,324	45,936	42,748	46,722	63,420	14,210	41,480	48,446	69,038	68,214

The statistics cover twelve month periods that start in April.

== Services ==
Portlethen previously had a somewhat limited service, with trains only calling early in the morning and evening peaks and at night times with large gaps at certain times during the day, but an improved timetable has accounted for much of the growth in recent years. As of May 2026, there is approximately one train per hour in each direction between Montrose and Inverurie.

Preceding station	National Rail	Following station
Stonehaven	ScotRail; Dundee–Aberdeen line	Aberdeen
Stonehaven; To Montrose	ScotRail; Aberdeen Crossrail	Aberdeen; To Inverurie
	Historical railways	
Newtonhill; Line open; Station closed	Aberdeen Railway	Cove Bay; Line open; Station closed

== Bibliography ==
- Quick, Michael (2023). Railway Passenger Stations in Great Britain: A Chronology (PDF) (5th ed.). London: Railway and Canal Historical Society.
