= Stonehaven derailment =

Train derailment in Scotland

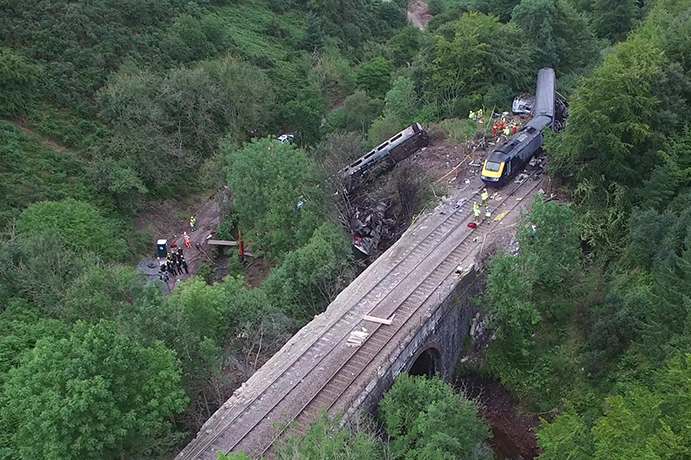
- Aerial view of the site on 13 August 2020

- Location of accident

Details
- Date: 12 August 2020; 09:38 BST (UTC+1)
- Location: Carmont, near Stonehaven, Aberdeenshire
- Coordinates: 56°57′09″N 2°19′16″W
- Country: Scotland
- Line: Dundee–Aberdeen
- Operator: Abellio ScotRail
- Service: 1T08 06:38 Aberdeen to Glasgow
- Incident type: Derailment
- Cause: Train striking landslip

Statistics
- Trains: 1
- Passengers: 7
- Crew: 2
- Deaths: 3
- Injured: 6 (3 serious)

The Stonehaven derailment (also known as the Carmont derailment) was a fatal railway accident that occurred at 09:38 BST on 12 August 2020, when a passenger train returning to Aberdeen hit a landslip, near Carmont, west of Stonehaven in Aberdeenshire, Scotland, following severe rain. Of the nine people aboard, three were killed, and six were injured.

The accident was the first in the United Kingdom in which a passenger was killed on a train since the 2007 Grayrigg derailment, the first major accident involving a High Speed Train since the 2004 Ufton Nervet rail crash, and the first fatal accident in which a train hit a landslip since the 1995 Ais Gill rail accident.

Network Rail faced health and safety charges relating to the crash. After pleading guilty at the High Court in Aberdeen in September 2023, the company was fined £6.7 million for its failings. A fatal accident inquiry concluded a faulty drain which caused the accident had not been constructed and installed in accordance with its design, and precautions which could have been taken to avoid the accident were not taken.

== Background ==
Severe thunderstorms occurred in the area on the night of 11 August, during an amber severe weather warning from the Met Office. The storms caused flooding across Aberdeenshire on the morning of the derailment. Flooding in the local area saw water levels on Carron Water in Stonehaven rise by 1.54 metres (5 ft 1 in) as of 09:00, 12 August. The severe weather had caused significant disruption across East Scotland with a number of other rail services being either curtailed or cancelled. A total of 51.5 millimetres (2.03 in) of rainfall fell at the accident site. The storms also caused disruption further afield. Perth station was severely flooded, with a train being trapped in the water. The Glasgow–Edinburgh via Falkirk line was severely affected when the bank of the Union Canal failed, flooding the line near Polmont.

The stretch of the Dundee-Aberdeen line where the derailment occurred has had problems with mudslides in the past. In 1915, a train had struck a landslip and derailed south of the site of the derailment. On 22 October 2002, it was closed due to a landslide at Carmont, during torrential rain and gales. A Network Rail report from 2014 included Carmont in a "list of sites which in recent years have been greatly affected by earthslips". The track operator's report said improvement work had been carried out at Carmont, specifically, "remediation of cutting slope following emergency, after mudslide due to flooding". The Office of Rail and Road (ORR), responsible for the safety regulation of Britain's railways, noted a spike in lineside landslips, demonstrating the "vulnerability" of the network, in their 2019–2020 Annual Safety Report, published in July 2020. At around the same time of the incident, Network Rail Scotland shared video footage of a landslip across the railway line in the Carmont area.

== Incident ==
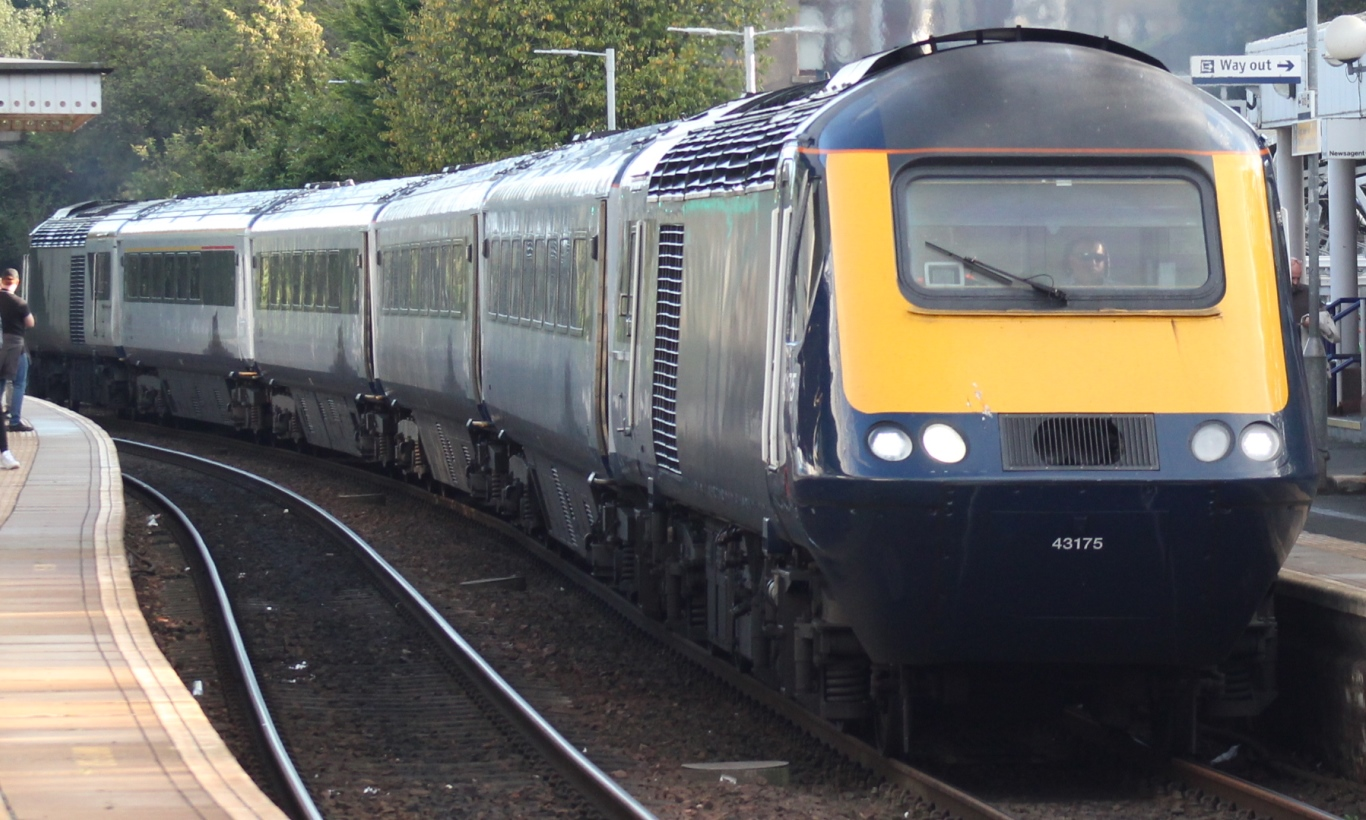
An Abellio ScotRail Inter7City set, similar to the train involved

On 12 August 2020, Abellio ScotRail's 06:38 Inter7City service from Aberdeen to Glasgow Queen Street had fewer passengers than usual due to the COVID-19 pandemic, with Aberdeen being under lockdown at the time. The train comprised four Mark 3 passenger carriages with Class 43 power cars 43030 and 43140 at either end. (Note: The train was formed of 43030 at the south, Trailer Standard (Open) Lavatory 41245, Trailer Standard (Open) 42564, Trailer Standard Disabled (Open) 42007, Trailer Guard First Buffet 40622 and 43140, the whole forming set HA22.) It had two crew members (the driver and a conductor) and was carrying seven passengers, one of whom was a ScotRail conductor on-shift but travelling as a passenger ahead of working a service from Dundee. Trains on that section of line are signalled under the absolute block system.

Whilst travelling south on the double track main line which runs between Aberdeen and Dundee, at 06:59, the driver stopped the train after the signaller at Carmont Signal Box (Note: Carmont Signal Box: 56.938964°N 2.350288°W) passed on a message from the driver of another train that a landslip had blocked the line between Carmont and Laurencekirk. Unable to proceed south, the train was held at Carmont for more than two hours because a Mobile Operations Manager needed to attend to clamp the points, which were not fitted with facing point locks, before the train could traverse them. The mobile operations manager reported the train in sight, and carried out the necessary work to allow the stricken service to traverse the track. The train then crossed the line and headed back north to Aberdeen at 09:36, by which time the weather had cleared to "bright sunshine". The train crossed to the northbound line at the Carmont crossover, (Note: Carmont crossover: 56.93851°N 2.35049°W) near the site of the former Carmont railway station about 5 1/2 miles (9 km) west of Stonehaven at a speed of 5 mph (8 km/h). (Note: By rail; calculated from Scotland Route Sectional Appendix.) As there was no known obstruction of the line between Carmont and Stonehaven, the signalman was not required to instruct the driver of the train to travel at caution in order to be able to stop short of an obstruction. About 1.4 miles (2.3 km) after the crossover the train was travelling at 72.8 mph (117.2 km/h)—within the line-speed limit of 75 mph (121 km/h)—when it ran into another landslip at 09:38 and all vehicles, except the rear power car, were derailed.

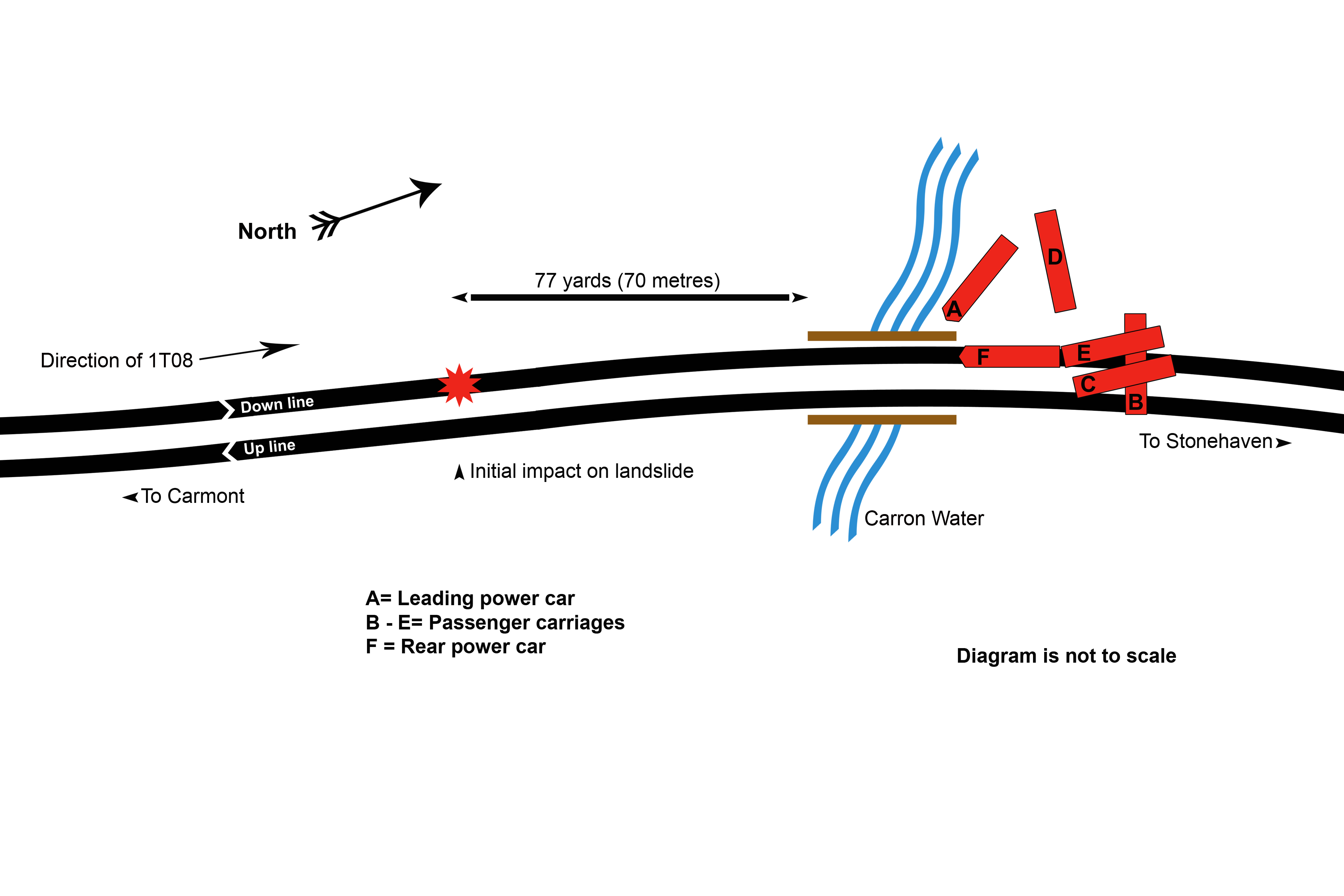
A schematic diagram of the Stonehaven derailment showing where the individual vehicles came to rest in the accident

As the track curved to the right, the train continued straight on for about 77 yards (70 m). It struck and destroyed the parapet of a single span bridge carrying the railway over Carron Water. (Note: Bridge reference: UB 133/325) The leading power car then fell down a wooded embankment and caught fire. The first carriage turned sideways, coming to rest across the tracks, inverted, with the second carriage, also inverted, and the fourth, lying on top of it. The third carriage ended up lying on its side, also down the embankment, and caught fire. The rear power car remained substantially upright and coupled to the fourth carriage. The landslip had been caused by the failure of a drain which Network Rail had installed in 2012 and had last been inspected in June 2020, when no faults had been found.

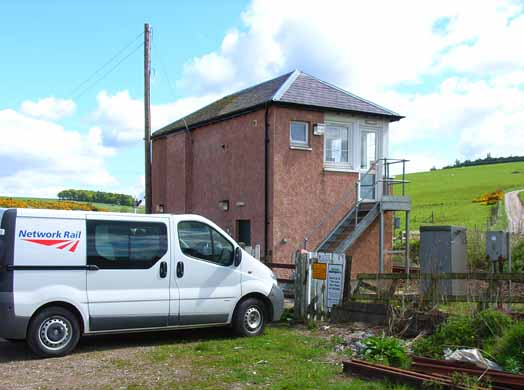
Carmont Signal Box, seen in 2006

Contractors were working to protect the bridge over the River Carron at the time, and were able to avoid being hit by the derailed vehicles. Their supervisor raised the alarm by a 999 call at 09:40. The railway employee who had been travelling as a passenger, despite suffering minor injuries herself, walked back along the track to the nearest line-side telephone, to raise the alarm to Carmont signal box, 1.5 miles (2.4 km) down the line. Following the initial incident, thick smoke was visible from the crash site.

Three people died: the driver, the conductor, and a passenger. The six survivors were all injured, three seriously. One woman was flung through a window of coach B and came to lying beside the tracks. The accident was the first involving the fatality of a passenger on a train in the United Kingdom since the Grayrigg derailment on 23 February 2007, (Note: A fatal tram crash in Croydon in 2016 killed seven people.) and the first major accident involving a High Speed Train in the United Kingdom since the Ufton Nervet rail crash on 6 November 2004. It was the first railway accident in the United Kingdom in which someone died after a train hit a landslip since the 1995 Ais Gill rail accident.

== Response ==
British Transport Police were alerted to the incident at about 09:43, and a major incident was declared. The alarm was raised by a Network Rail worker who used the what3words app to give a 999-call operator the location of the accident.

Multiple Scottish Ambulance Service ambulances, air ambulance and coastguard helicopters attended the scene, using a nearby field. Scottish Fire and Rescue Service sent 12 fire engines and specialist resources. Three coastguard vehicles drove along the railway from Carmont to reach the scene, straddling the tracks. One casualty was flown to Aberdeen Royal Infirmary in the coastguard helicopter. NHS Grampian assumed a "major incident footing". A rapid relief team set up a tent providing food and drink for emergency service personnel. Marks and Spencer donated food. Six people were taken to hospital with injuries that were "not believed to be serious". Five of them were discharged from hospital by 17 August, the other on 19 August.

At the time of the accident, engineering works were ongoing, to repair and reinforce the foundations of the railway bridge, which had deteriorated and suffering from water scour of the footings. The firefighting and casualty evacuation response was greatly aided by the temporary access road, standing area and ramp constructed as part of these works. Smoke from the fire was blown away from the emergency services assembly point at the top of the temporary ramp.

On 14 August, Prince Charles visited the crash site and thanked emergency responders for their bravery.

In September, the Secretary of State for Transport, Grant Shapps, asked the chief constable of Police Scotland to commend PC Liam Mercer, of Stonehaven police station, who was first on the scene, for his bravery. He had earlier described Mercer's actions as "extraordinary and humbling". Nicola Whyte, the off-duty conductor who walked along the tracks to raise the alarm, was given a "special recognition" at the Evening Express' Aberdeen's Champion Awards.

== Aftermath ==
The Independent Press Standards Organisation received a "high volume" of complaints about a front-page headline in the 13 August edition of the Scottish Sun, referring to the derailed train as the "Death Express". On 14 August the newspaper's editor, Alan Muir, issued an apology. An opinion piece in Rail magazine, by its editor Nigel Harris, criticised the Scottish Sun and other sections of the press for their poor journalism, particularly their grasp of the technicalities of railway operations. BBC Radio 4's Today programme, BBC Scotland and Channel 4 were also criticised. Harris praised Gwyn Topham of The Guardian for coverage that was "timely, measured, accurate and of appropriate tone".

A week after the accident, a minute's silence was held at railway stations across the United Kingdom in memory of the victims of the accident. The event took place at 09:43, the time the accident was first reported.

The railway between Aberdeen and Dundee was originally expected to remain closed until mid-September. Buses replaced trains between these stations. On 28 August, it was announced that the line would remain closed for "several more weeks". An October date was later given. From 31 August, trains were reinstated between Aberdeen and Stonehaven. ScotRail cited train crew availability and train fuel capacity as the reasons that rail services could not be reinstated between Dundee and Montrose. On 30 October, Network Rail announced that the line would re-open on 3 November.

Work to remove the vehicles from the crash site, made difficult by the surrounding terrain, began on 10 September and required the construction of a 900-metre (980 yd) road to enable a 600-tonne (590-long-ton; 660-short-ton) crawler crane to access the site. A smaller crane was needed to erect the large crane, which took a week to construct. The final carriage was lifted on 15 September, and removed from the site before 21 September. In the meantime, the site was handed back to Network Rail on 19 September. Once recovered, the vehicles were taken to a secure compound at Glasgow Works to allow the Rail Accident Investigation Branch (RAIB) to gather further evidence. All except power car 43030 were scrapped in May 2021, with this taken to Haymarket TMD where it was stripped for parts before being scrapped in November 2022.

Following the publication of the RAIB's final report in March 2022, drivers' union ASLEF called for the withdrawal of High Speed Trains. This was described as a "knee-jerk reaction" which was "wrong-headed" by Rail editor Nigel Harris. Christian Wolmar suggested that the withdrawal of High Speed Trains could actually lead to more deaths, since it would encourage travellers to drive rather than taking the train (cars being inherently less safe than trains). On 27 April 2022, a motion by ASLEF calling for a public enquiry into the accident was unanimously endorsed at the Scottish Trades Union Conference in Aberdeen.

In response to the report, Transport Scotland announced that a steering group was being set up to drive safety improvements on railways in Scotland. In July, it was revealed that the group had still not met, a situation criticised by the National Union of Rail, Maritime and Transport Workers.

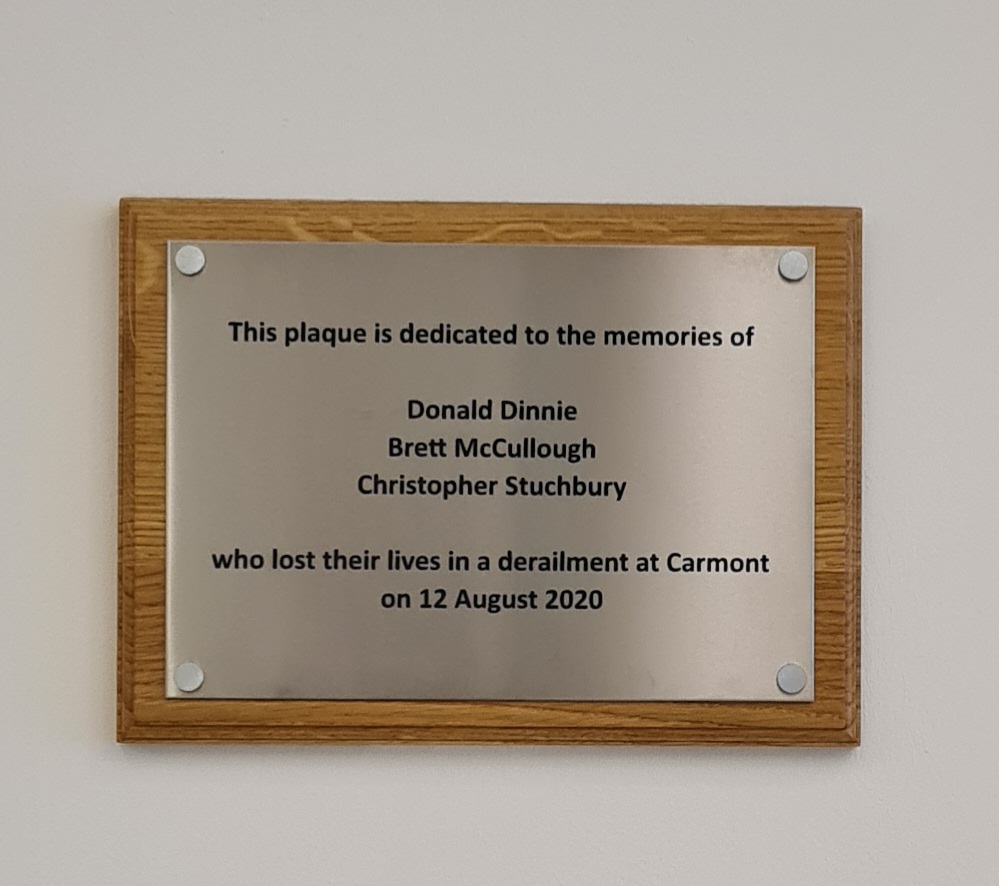
The commemorative plaque at Aberdeen Railway Station dedicated to Donald Dinnie, Brett McCullough, and Christopher Stuchbury.

A plaque commemorating the three dead was placed adjacent to the war memorial at Aberdeen station.

== Investigations ==
There was a joint investigation by the ORR, Police Scotland, and the British Transport Police, directed by the Crown Office and Procurator Fiscal Service. In parallel the RAIB carried out an independent investigation. Inspectors from both the ORR and RAIB were dispatched to the site on 12 August 2020. The RAIB expected to conclude its on-site investigation in early September.

On 13 August 2020, the then Secretary of State for Transport, Grant Shapps, ordered Network Rail to produce an interim report on the "wider issues" that may have resulted in the crash. The interim report was duly published on 1 September that year. He also asked Network Rail to carry out resilience checks on other areas of the network potentially subject to flash flooding in "the next few days, few hours". A final report was expected later in 2020. On 25 August, Network Rail set up two new task forces, one aimed at improving its response to severe weather and the other aimed at better management of earthworks. The reports of both task forces were published in March 2021.

On 14 August 2020, the RAIB provided an initial report on the accident and provided details of the likely scope of their investigation. An update was issued on 21 August 2020. On 15 August that year, the chief inspector of rail accidents, Simon French, said the derailment would have been "much worse had the train been more heavily loaded" but that it was "amongst the worst" he had seen over his 16 years with the RAIB. He added: "To be sure about this, we need data from the train, and we are working with the other agencies here on-site to gain access to the data recorder, but given the circumstances it's a difficult task and it will be some time."

On 19 April 2021, the RAIB issued an interim report. On 10 March 2022, the final report was published. It was reported that the investigation recognised several factors that contributed to the accident, including faulty drainage systems, which, in 2011/2012, Carillion failed to construct to the required design. Carillion had failed to notify designers Arup or Network Rail that they had made changes to the design of the drainage. Other factors identified included the workload pressure on the Scotland route control team that day, the age of the train, and a lack of adequate training for the train's personnel. The RAIB made 20 recommendations in its final report.

In August 2022, Police Scotland announced that the joint ORR, Police Scotland and British Transport Police investigation had concluded, and a report had been submitted to the Crown Office and Procurator Fiscal Service.

== Prosecution ==
It was reported in January 2023 that Network Rail was to face health and safety charges, but not corporate homicide charges, in relation to the crash. (Note: Carillion went into liquidation in January 2018.) At the High Court in Aberdeen on 7 September 2023, Network Rail admitted health and safety failings over the crash, whereby they failed to ensure that the drainage works had been carried out correctly. Network Rail were fined £6.7 million. Network Rail Scotland issued a statement, quoting Alex Hynes, managing director of Scotland's Railway:

The Carmont derailment and the tragic loss of Christopher Stuchbury, Donald Dinnie and Brett McCullough was a terrible day for their families, everyone involved, and for the railway network.

It is clear that our infrastructure was at fault for the accident, so it is right that Network Rail pled guilty.

To the families of those who lost their lives we would say again how deeply sorry we are that this tragedy was able to happen. And to those survivors who were injured, we are very sorry for the pain and distress caused.

Since the accident, we have been working hard to make our railway safer and to learn the lessons of Carmont.

We are absolutely committed to delivering on the recommendations made by the Rail Accident Investigation Branch in its report into the accident.

In October 2023 it was reported that Network Rail paid "nearly £1 million" in compensation to crash victims in out-of-court settlements following civil action.

== Fatal accident inquiry ==
A fatal accident inquiry was opened into the incident in Aberdeen in early 2026. Sheriff Lesley Johnston concluded the drain had not been constructed and installed in accordance with its design, and precautions which could have been taken to avoid the accident were not taken. Johnston's written determination, published in November 2026, said precautions could have included:

- The drain being built by construction firm Carillion in accordance with the design
- 'As built' drawings of the new drain being prepared and provided to Network Rail
- Network Rail complying with its own standards in place at the time of the end of the drain construction that required it to get such drawings.

Johnston criticised "Network Rail's oversight and management of the construction of the drain and the failure to ensure the drain was constructed properly and in accordance with the design drawings". She noted there had been "a significant cultural shift within Network Rail since this derailment in its understanding the impact of weather and in particular, viewing rainfall as a hazard to railway operations."
