= Kintore railway station =

Railway station in Aberdeenshire, Scotland

Kintore Scottish Gaelic: Ceann Tòrr
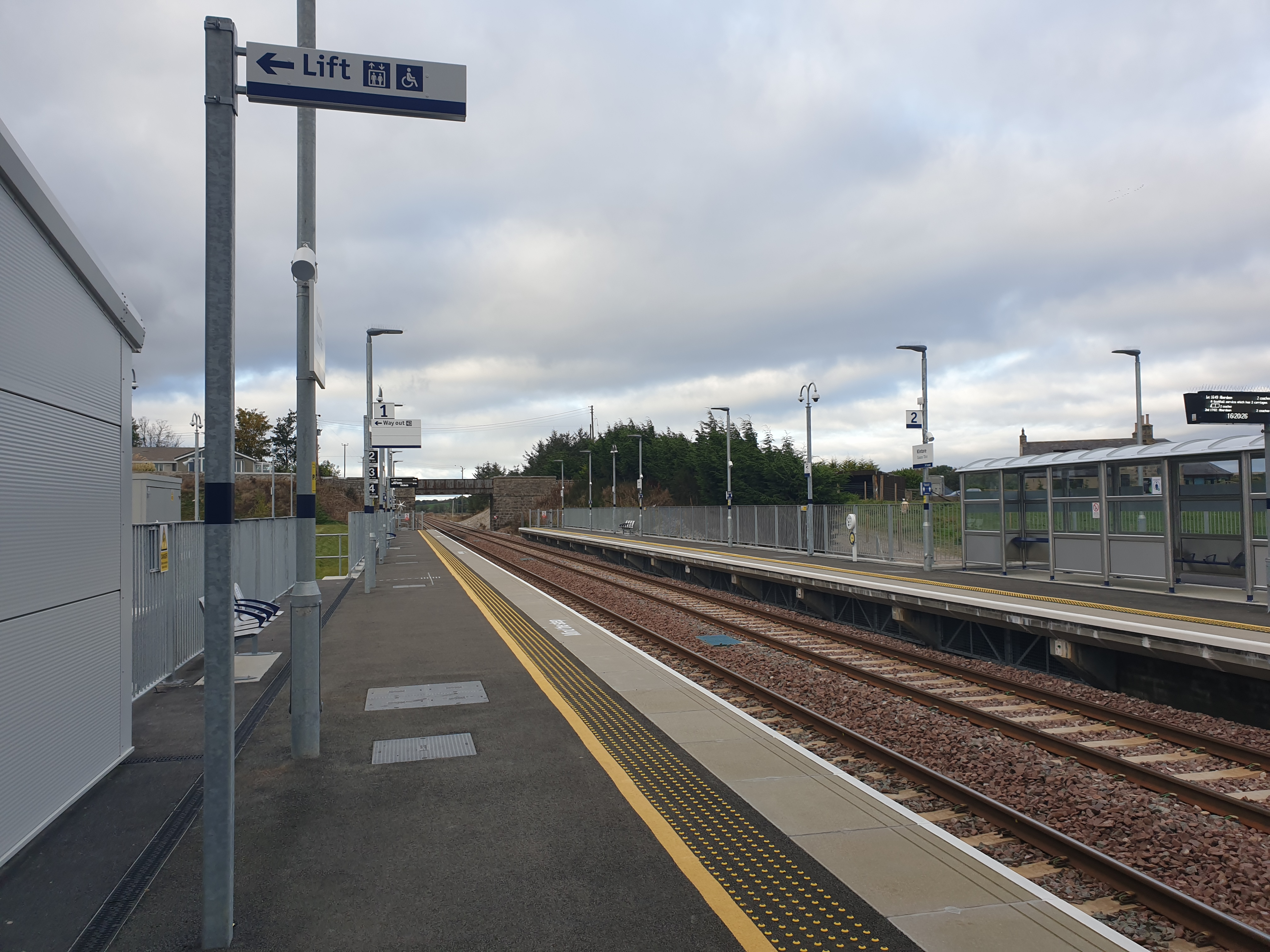
- Kintore railway station in 2020

General information
- Location: Kintore, Aberdeenshire; Scotland
- Coordinates: 57°14′37″N 2°21′01″W
- Grid reference: NJ789170
- Managed by: ScotRail
- Platforms: 2

Other information
- Station code: KTR

History
- Original company: Great North of Scotland Railway
- Pre-grouping: Great North of Scotland Railway

Key dates
- 20 September 1854: Opened
- 7 December 1964: Closed
- 15 October 2020: Reopened at a different site

Passengers
- 2020/21: 8,474
- 2021/22: ▲66,168
- 2022/23: ▲85,348
- 2023/24: ▲0.119 million
- 2024/25: ▲0.124 million
Location

Kintore railway station is in Kintore, Scotland on the Aberdeen–Inverness line. Originally opened in 1854, it closed in 1964 but was reopened on a different site in 2020. It is 13 miles 53 chains (22.0 km) from Aberdeen.

== History ==
=== Original station ===
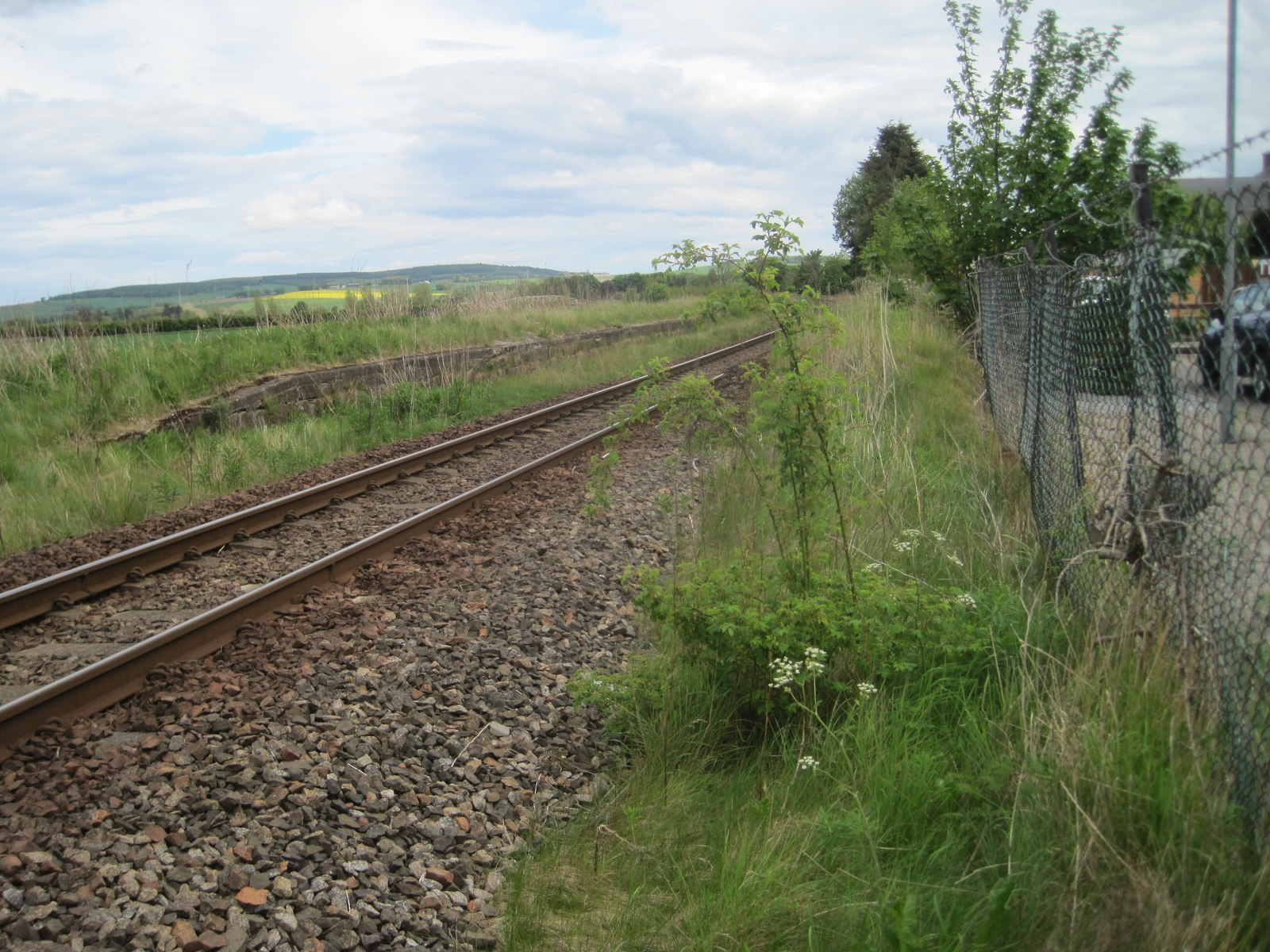
The remains of the original station in 2017 before track was redoubled

The original station was opened on 20 September 1854 and located around 550 m (600 yd) south of the current station. The station became a junction in 1859 with the opening of a branch to Alford. This branch closed to passengers in 1949. Kintore railway station itself was closed in 1964 as part of the Beeching cuts.

=== Modern station ===
Nestrans initially raised the possibility of reopening a Kintore station in 2009 as part of its 2010-2021 Rail Action Plan and it was first discussed in the Scottish Parliament in October that year. Plans to reopen the station were announced in December 2012.

Reopening Kintore was made possible by the completion of phase one of the Aberdeen-Inverness Improvement Project, which redoubled the track between Aberdeen and Inverurie, increasing capacity for new passenger and freight services on the route. The station cost £15 million, funded by Transport Scotland, Aberdeenshire Council and Nestrans. The main contractor was BAM Nuttall. Construction started in 2019 with opening planned for May 2020, but work was halted between March and July 2020 due to the coronavirus pandemic, which caused the opening date to be pushed back to 15 October.

The new Kintore station is located around 550 m (600 yd) to the north of the old one, on the site of the junction for the now dismantled Alford branch.

== Facilities ==
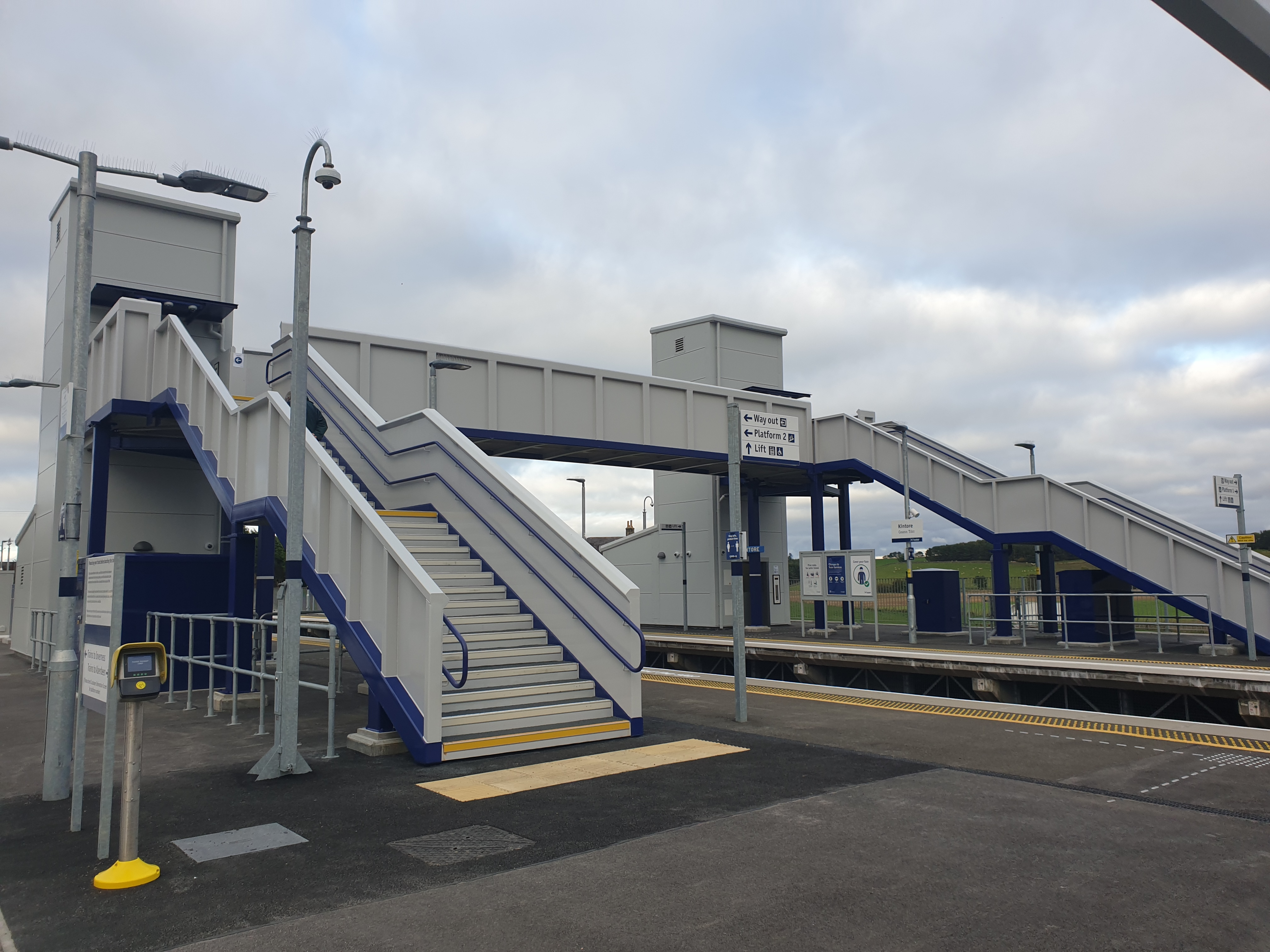
The accessible footbridge

Facilities include a new footbridge and lifts for step-free access, bike storage facilities and a 168-space car park including disabled parking and 24 charging spaces for electric vehicles. Signs and benches from the original station were refurbished and installed at the new station. The station is accessible generally including ticket machines; there is a waiting room but no ticket office.

== Passenger volume ==
Passenger Volume at Kintore
	2020–21	2021–22	2022–23	2023–24	2024–25
Entries and exits	8,474	66,168	85,348	118,514	124,436

The statistics cover twelve month periods that start in April.

== Services ==
As of May 2026, the station sees approximately 1 train every 2 hours between Aberdeen and Inverness, calling at all stations, as well as a two-hourly shuttle to Montrose. One per day continues to Edinburgh Waverley. There are additional shuttle services between here and Aberdeen to fill gaps in the service, giving 2 or 3 trains per hour between here and Aberdeen. On Sundays, all trains (except one to Glasgow Queen Street) terminate at Aberdeen, making an average of one train every hour in each direction.

Preceding station	National Rail	Following station
Dyce	ScotRail; Aberdeen to Inverness Line	Inverurie
Dyce; Towards Montrose	ScotRail; Aberdeen Crossrail	Inverurie; Terminus
	Historical railways	
Kinaldie; Line open; station closed	Great North of Scotland Railway; GNSR Main Line	Inverurie; Line and station open
Kemnay; Line and station closed	Great North of Scotland Railway; Alford Valley Railway	Terminus

== Bibliography ==
- Butt, R. V. J. (October 1995). The Directory of Railway Stations: details every public and private passenger station, halt, platform and stopping place, past and present (1st ed.). Sparkford: Patrick Stephens Ltd. ISBN 978-1-85260-508-7. OCLC 60251199. OL 11956311M.
- Jowett, Alan (March 1989). Jowett's Railway Atlas of Great Britain and Ireland: From Pre-Grouping to the Present Day (1st ed.). Sparkford: Patrick Stephens Ltd. ISBN 978-1-85260-086-0. OCLC 22311137.
