= Railway stations in Arbroath =

Arbroath railway station can refer to one of several railway stations in the town of Arbroath, Scotland — only the one now named simply Arbroath railway station is still in existence:

== Open ==
- Arbroath railway station on the link line

== Closed ==
- Arbroath Catherine Street: Terminus of the Arbroath and Forfar Railway
- Arbroath Lady Loan: Terminus of the Dundee and Arbroath Railway (also known as Arbroath West)

== Sources ==
- Awdry, Christopher (1990). Encyclopaedia of British Railway Companies. Sparkford: Patrick Stephens Ltd. ISBN 1-8526-0049-7. OCLC 19514063. CN 8983.
- Butt, R. V. J. (October 1995). The Directory of Railway Stations: details every public and private passenger station, halt, platform and stopping place, past and present (1st ed.). Sparkford: Patrick Stephens Ltd. ISBN 978-1-85260-508-7. OCLC 60251199. OL 11956311M.
- Jowett, Alan (March 1989). Jowett's Railway Atlas of Great Britain and Ireland: From Pre-Grouping to the Present Day (1st ed.). Sparkford: Patrick Stephens Ltd. ISBN 978-1-85260-086-0. OCLC 22311137.
