= Dundee railway station =

Railway station in Dundee, Scotland

Dundee Scottish Gaelic: Dùn Dè
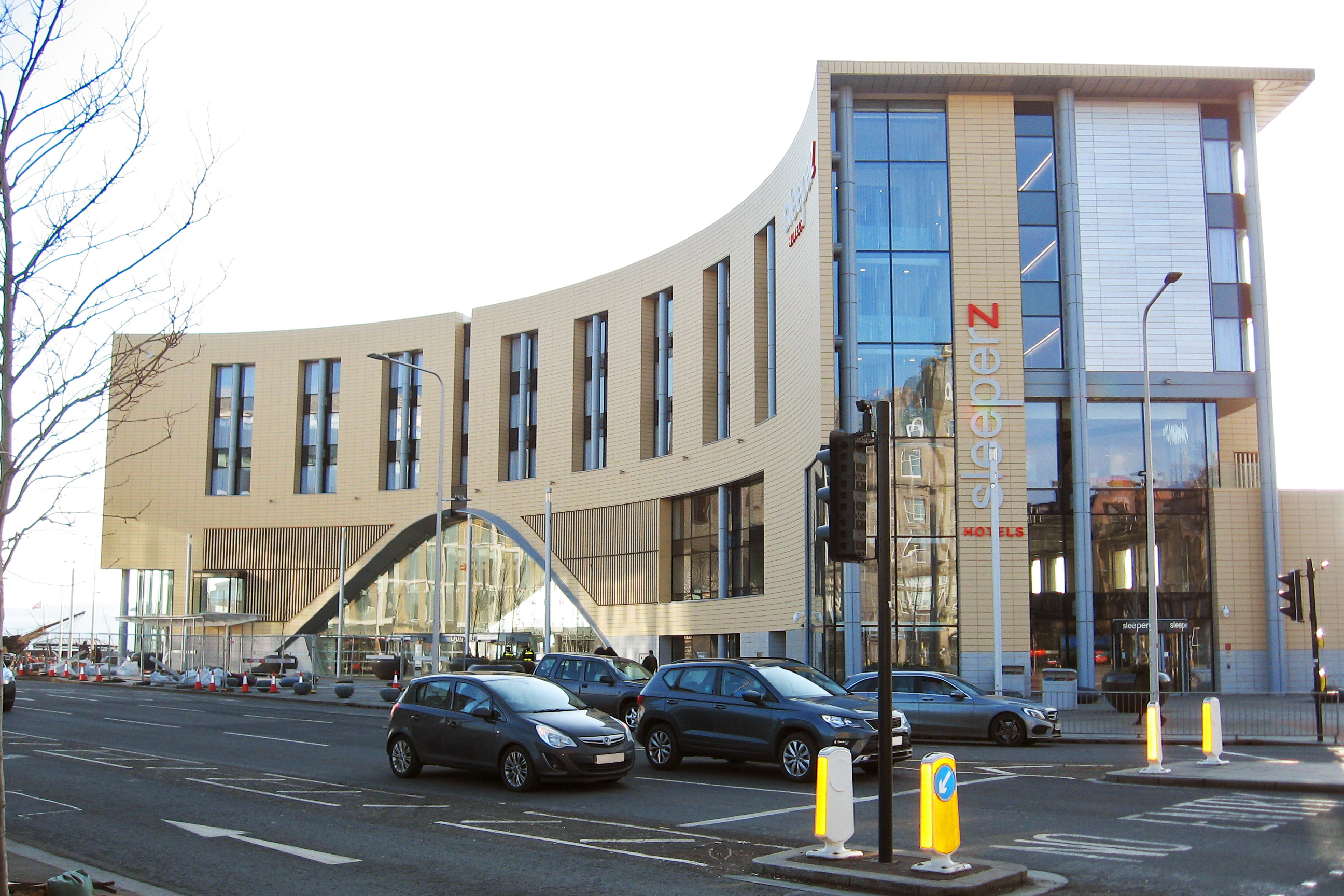

General information
- Location: Dundee, Dundee City; Scotland
- Coordinates: 56.4566°N 2.9710°W
- Grid reference: NO402298
- Managed by: ScotRail
- Platforms: 4

Other information
- Station code: DEE

History
- Original company: North British Railway
- Post-grouping: LNER

Key dates
- 1 June 1878: Opened as Dundee Tay Bridge
- 1965: Renamed as Dundee

Passengers
- 2020/21: ▼0.318 million
- Interchange: ▼8,539
- 2021/22: ▲1.168 million
- Interchange: ▲42,726
- 2022/23: ▲1.454 million
- Interchange: ▲68,073
- 2023/24: ▲1.729 million
- Interchange: ▲76,954
- 2024/25: ▲1.764 million
- Interchange: ▲79,138
Location
Notes
- Passenger statistics from the Office of Rail and Road

Dundee railway station serves the city of Dundee on the east coast of Scotland. It is situated on the northern, non-electrified section of the East Coast Main Line, 59 1/4 miles (95.4 km) northeast of Edinburgh. Dundee is the tenth busiest station in Scotland. In January 2014, the former main station building was demolished to make way for a new building as part of the Dundee Waterfront Project which opened on 9 July 2018.

Dundee railway station is where the Edinburgh–Dundee line meets the Glasgow–Dundee line, via Perth, to form the Dundee to Aberdeen line.

== History ==
The station is the rebuilt Dundee Tay Bridge railway station, which had been opened by the North British Railway on 1 June 1878 as part of the Tay Rail Bridge project. It was originally one of three main stations in Dundee, along with Dundee West station, the Caledonian Railway station for Perth which was rebuilt in 1889-1890 and closed in the 1960s, and Dundee East station on the Dundee and Arbroath Joint Railway which closed in 1959.

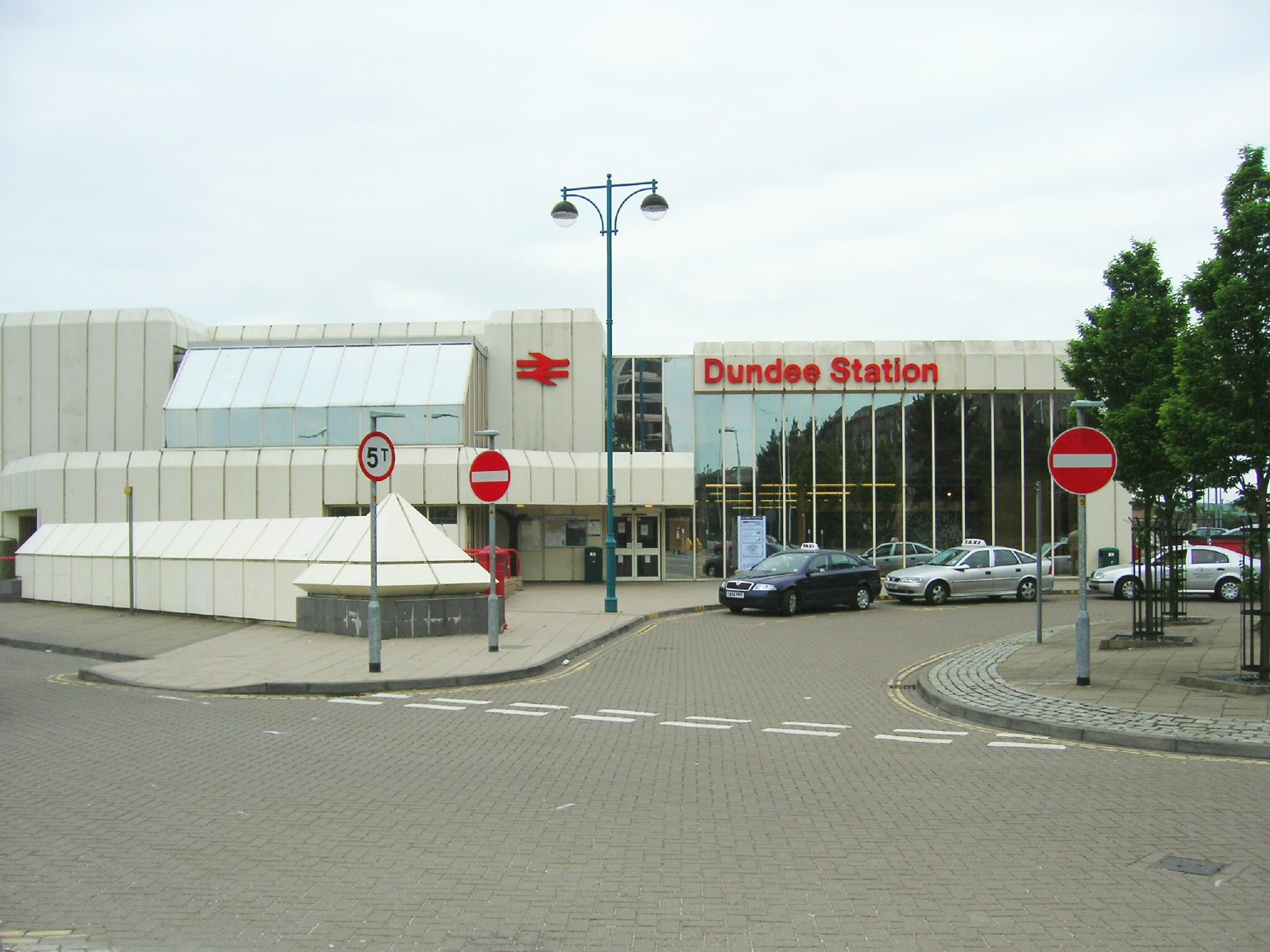
The former station building which was demolished in 2013

In the nineteenth century plans were put forward to concentrate all Dundee's railway facilities in a new central station, with the idea first being mooted by John Leng in 1864 in his role as editor of the Dundee Advertiser. The idea re-emerged in 1872 following the start of work on the Tay Rail Bridge and again in 1896. Various sites for the scheme were suggested including building it between the High Street and the harbour and between the Murraygate and the Meadows. However, none of these proposals were ever realised and the three distinct stations survived as independent entities.

Today, the only other remaining station within Dundee City boundaries is Broughty Ferry. Both Balmossie and Invergowrie stations are located very close to the city's boundaries, but lie in Angus and Perth and Kinross.

As part of the redevelopment of Dundee city centre in the 1960s the original public entrance of Dundee Tay Bridge station was demolished to accommodate the new Tay Road Bridge offramps, with a new smaller structure replacing it. A footbridge connected the new station building to the city's Union Street to allow pedestrians to cross the busy inner ring road safely. In 2005, the footbridge was demolished in two phases as part of a regeneration project called the Dundee Central Waterfront Development Plan. This project, which has included removal of the 1970s public entrance to the station, will attempt to restructure the approach roads to the Tay Road Bridge and create a new civic space, as well as making way for the new railway station.

=== New station ===
A new £38m railway station was built in 2018; it replaced the old station as part of the Dundee waterfront regeneration project. The designer of the station was Dundee-based architecture firm Nicoll Russell Studios in collaboration with Jacobs Engineering Group; construction work was carried out by Balfour Beatty. Construction began in late 2015 and a temporary entrance was established on Riverside Drive. The new station was built over the site of the demolished old station. It includes a five-storey, curved building that houses the new station entrance, concourse and access points on the first and underground floors as well as a 120-room Sleeperz Hotel occupying the upper floors.

Construction of the new railway station was completed in early June and it was opened alongside the new Sleeperz Hotel on 9 July 2018 by Dundee West MSP & then Minister for Public Health and Sport Joe FitzPatrick, Lord Provost Ian Borthwick and representatives from Dundee City Council.

== Facilities ==
There is a taxi stand immediately outside of the station building, and the main bus interchange is ½-mile walk from the station in the city centre. There is a "Travel Office" for information and ticket purchasing, as well as an automatic ticket machine outside the office.

== Platform layout ==
The station is based on an island platform, with two through platforms on the outer sides, and two west-facing bay platforms:

- Platform 1 is the westbound through platform. It is used for trains from Arbroath and Aberdeen to Glasgow Queen Street and Edinburgh Waverley.
- Platform 2 and 3 are the bay platforms, used for terminating trains from Edinburgh and Glasgow.
- Platform 4 is the eastbound through platform, used for trains towards Arbroath and Aberdeen.

== Passenger volume ==
Passenger Volume at Dundee
	2004–05	2005–06	2006–07	2007–08	2008–09	2009–10	2010–11	2011–12	2012–13	2013–14	2014–15	2015–16	2016–17	2017–18	2018–19	2019–20	2020–21	2021–22	2022–23	2023–24	2024–25
Entries and exits	1,437,519	1,514,725	1,490,254	1,600,060	1,636,862	1,664,210	1,719,844	1,723,018	1,690,486	1,737,444	1,835,978	1,890,134	1,815,342	1,865,728	2,015,782	1,945,950	317,582	1,167,730	1,453,560	1,729,316	1,763,546
Interchanges	32,095	31,818	37,636	49,068	51,957	58,921	52,468	59,229	61,218	67,746	68,512	69,568	63,183	65,557	91,267	73,721	8,539	42,726	68,073	76,954	79,138

The statistics cover twelve month periods that start in April.

== Services ==
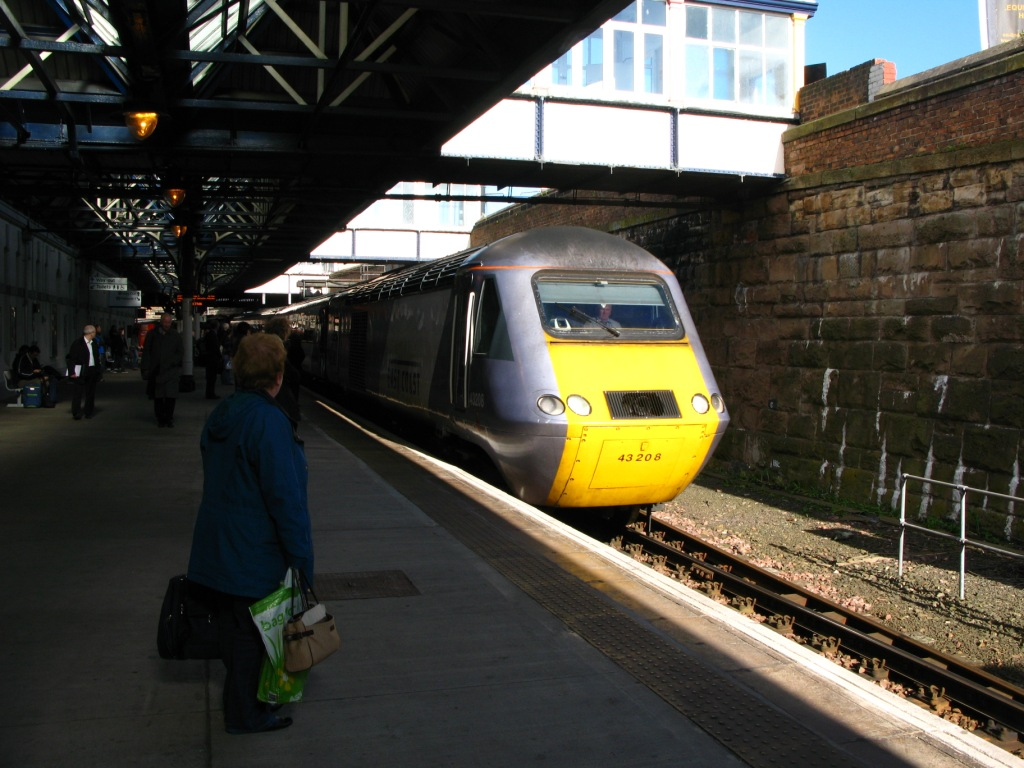
A East Coast service to London King's Cross

There are 3 direct services to London King's Cross per day, plus 1 CrossCountry service per day along the Cross Country Route between Aberdeen and Plymouth via Leeds, Sheffield, Derby, Birmingham New Street, Bristol Temple Meads, Exeter St Davids and Plymouth. Additionally, one LNER service per day will operate between Aberdeen and Leeds. More frequent services run to Glasgow Queen Street, Edinburgh and Aberdeen. Caledonian Sleeper provides overnight services to London Euston.

Off-peak services that operate from the station are:

=== ScotRail ===
- 1 train per hour to Edinburgh running via Leuchars, generally running fast, stopping only at Leuchars, Cupar and Haymarket.
- 1 train per hour to Edinburgh via Leuchars, Kirkcaldy, Inverkeithing and Haymarket.
- 1 train per hour to Glasgow Queen Street via Perth and Stirling.
- 1 train per hour (with some gaps) to Aberdeen via Arbroath, Montrose and Stonehaven.
- 1 train every 2 hours to Arbroath, calling at Broughty Ferry, Monifieth (every 2 hours) and Carnoustie.

=== CrossCountry ===
- 2 trains per day to Aberdeen.
- 1 train per day to Plymouth.
- 1 train per day to Edinburgh.

=== London North Eastern Railway ===
- 3 trains per day to London Kings Cross via Edinburgh, Newcastle and York.
- 4 trains per day to Aberdeen.
- 1 train per day to Leeds.

=== Caledonian Sleeper ===
- 1 train per day to London Euston from Aberdeen via Edinburgh, (Note: Passengers can board or alight at Edinburgh Waverley. This is where the Sleepers to/from Fort William, Inverness and Aberdeen join/separate.) Preston and Crewe.
- 1 train per day to Aberdeen from London Euston via Crewe, Preston and Edinburgh.

Preceding station	National Rail	Following station
Leuchars	London North Eastern Railway; East Coast Main Line	Arbroath
Leuchars	CrossCountry; Cross Country Route	Arbroath
Leuchars	CrossCountry; Cross Country Route	Aberdeen
Leuchars	Caledonian Sleeper; Highland Caledonian Sleeper	Carnoustie
Leuchars	ScotRail; Edinburgh–Dundee line	Terminus
Invergowrie	ScotRail; Glasgow–Dundee line	Terminus
Perth	ScotRail; Glasgow–Dundee line	Terminus
Terminus	ScotRail; Dundee–Aberdeen line	Broughty Ferry

== Bibliography ==
- Brailsford, Martyn, ed. (December 2017) [1987]. Railway Track Diagrams 1: Scotland & Isle of Man (6th ed.). Frome: Trackmaps. ISBN 978-0-9549866-9-8.
- Butt, R. V. J. (October 1995). The Directory of Railway Stations: details every public and private passenger station, halt, platform and stopping place, past and present (1st ed.). Sparkford: Patrick Stephens Ltd. ISBN 978-1-85260-508-7. OCLC 60251199. OL 11956311M.
- Jowett, Alan (March 1989). Jowett's Railway Atlas of Great Britain and Ireland: From Pre-Grouping to the Present Day (1st ed.). Sparkford: Patrick Stephens Ltd. ISBN 978-1-85260-086-0. OCLC 22311137.
- Quick, Michael (2023). Railway Passenger Stations in Great Britain: A Chronology (PDF) (5th ed.). London: Railway and Canal Historical Society.
- Yonge, John (May 1987). Gerald Jacobs (ed.). British Rail Track Diagrams - Book 1: ScotRail (1st ed.). Exeter: Quail Map Company. ISBN 0-9006-0948-6.
- Yonge, John (February 1993). Gerald Jacobs (ed.). Railway Track Diagrams - Book 1: Scotland and the Isle of Man (2nd ed.). Exeter: Quail Map Company. ISBN 0-9006-0995-8.
- Yonge, John (April 1996). Gerald Jacobs (ed.). Railway Track Diagrams - Book 1: Scotland and the Isle of Man (3rd ed.). Exeter: Quail Map Company. ISBN 1-8983-1919-7.
- Yonge, John (2007). Gerald Jacobs (ed.). Railway Track Diagrams - Book 1: Scotland & Isle of Man (Quail Track Plans) (fifth ed.). Bradford on Avon: Trackmaps (formerly Quail Map Co). ISBN 978-0-9549866-3-6. OCLC 79435248.
