= Dundee–Aberdeen line =

Railway Line in Scotland

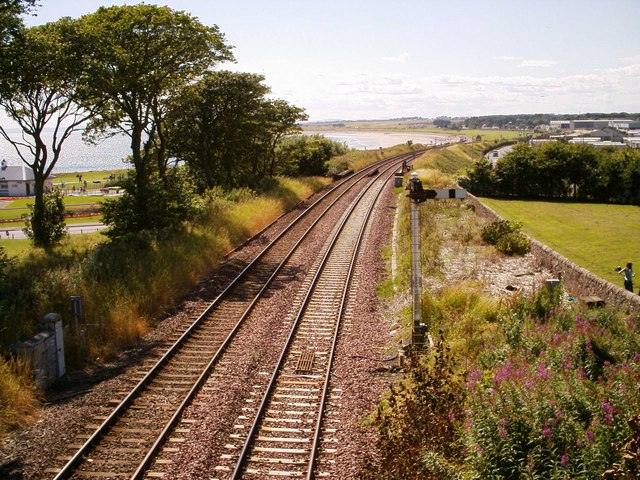
- A view of the line at Arbroath looking south

Overview
- Status: Operational
- Owner: Network Rail
- Locale: Angus; Aberdeenshire; Scotland
- Termini: Dundee; Aberdeen
- Stations: 13

Service
- Type: Heavy rail
- System: National Rail
- Operator(s): ScotRail; Caledonian Sleeper; CrossCountry; London North Eastern Railway

Technical
- Track gauge: 1,435 mm (4 ft 8 1/2 in) standard gauge
Route map
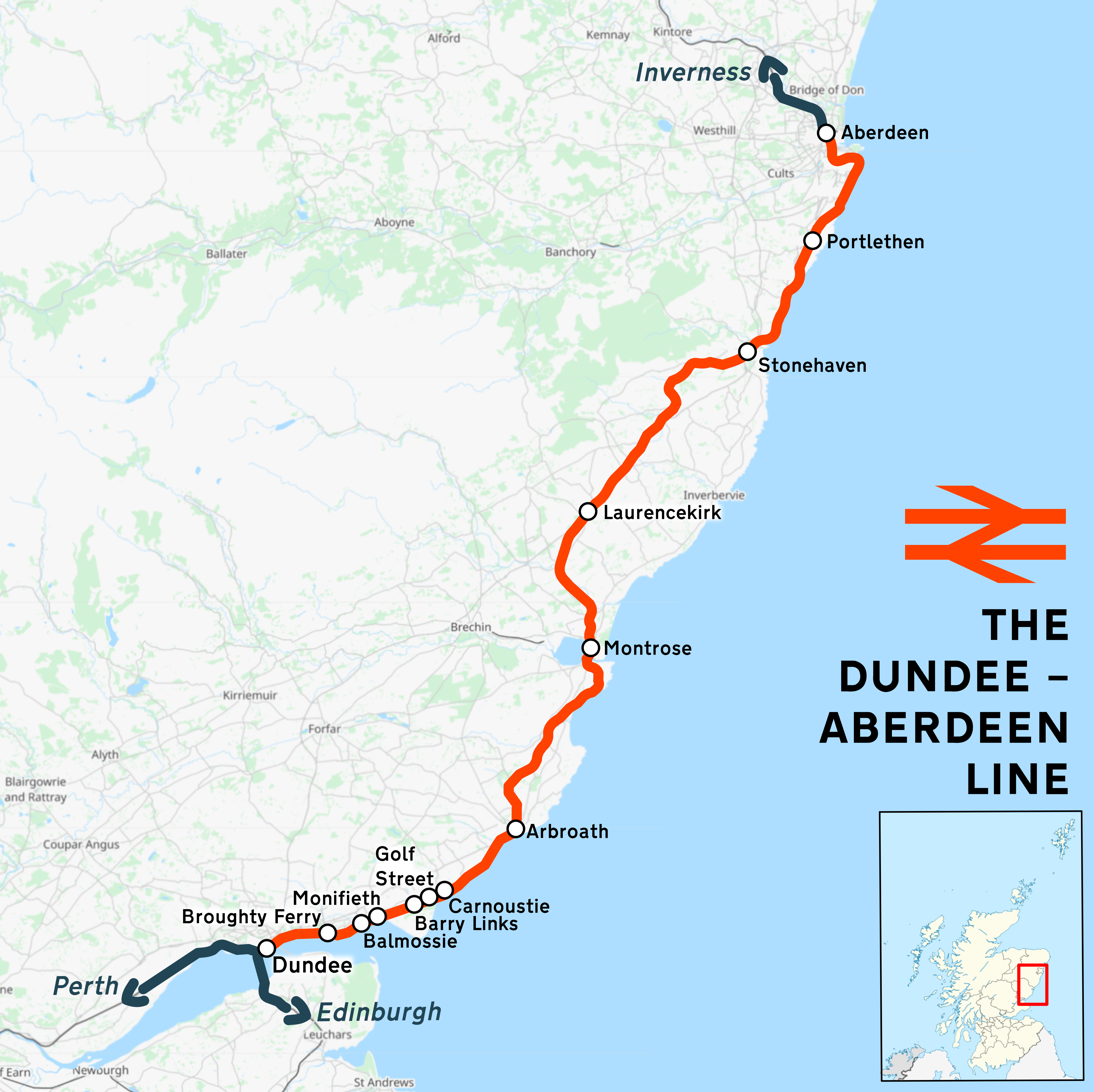
(Click to expand)

The Dundee–Aberdeen line is a railway line linking Dundee and Aberdeen in Scotland.

== History ==
The present line was built by three companies. The first section to open was the line from Dundee to Arbroath in 1838, constructed by the Dundee and Arbroath Railway. From 1849 to 1850 the Aberdeen Railway opened the line between Montrose and Aberdeen. The North British, Arbroath and Montrose Railway opened the line between Arbroath and Montrose in 1883.

== Route and line ==
The line runs from south to north and generally runs along the east coast, though it heads inland between Montrose and Stonehaven. The line is double-track apart from a 1.5 miles (2.4 km) single-track section south of Montrose, which includes the South Esk Viaduct. Plans to dual this section were announced in 2008 and again in 2016. It is not electrified.

At its northern terminus, Aberdeen railway station, the line meets the Aberdeen–Inverness line. At its southern terminus, Dundee railway station, the line meets the Dundee–Glasgow line (via Perth) and the Dundee–Edinburgh line. The five stations between Carnoustie and Dundee are close together and once had a regular stopping service, but this stopped in 1990. Since then, they have only had an infrequent parliamentary service. An approximately hourly service for Broughty Ferry and Monifieth was restored with the December 2018 timetable change.

=== Stations ===
Place	Station	Ordnance Survey grid reference	Services				Notes
Place	Station	Ordnance Survey grid reference	ScotRail	LNER	CrossCountry	Caledonian Sleeper	Notes
Dundee	Dundee	NO402298	●	●	●	●	Glasgow–Aberdeen line connection.
Dundee (Broughty Ferry)	Broughty Ferry	NO462309	●				
Monifieth (Balmossie)	Balmossie	NO484317	●				limited service
Monifieth	Monifieth	NO497322	●				
Carnoustie	Barry Links	NO542337	●				limited service
Carnoustie	Golf Street	NO557342	●				limited service
Carnoustie	Carnoustie	NO566345	●			●	
Arbroath	Arbroath	NO638409	●	●	●	●	
Montrose	Montrose	NO711579	●	●	●	●	
Laurencekirk	Laurencekirk		●				
Stonehaven	Stonehaven	NO863861	●	●	●	●	
Portlethen	Portlethen	NO923967	●				
Aberdeen	Aberdeen	NJ941058	●	●	●	●	Terminus of ECML services from London King's Cross, Caledonian Sleeper services from London Euston and Cross Country Route services from Penzance; Aberdeen to Inverness Line connection; NorthLink ferry to Orkney and Shetland.

== Incidents ==
On 28 December 1906, a severe blizzard caused 22 deaths and 24 injuries after two trains collided with each other between Carnoustie and Arbroath. For more information, see Elliot Junction rail accident.

The Stonehaven derailment occurred on 12 August 2020 which killed three people and required the line to remain closed between Stonehaven and Laurencekirk until 3 November. This section was closed again after a bridge parapet collapsed on 15 January 2021. The line reopened on 22 February 2021.

== Future ==
In the Scottish Government's National Transport Strategy, published in February 2020, it was stated that the line would be electrified with overhead lines by 2035.
