= Laurencekirk railway station =

Railway station in Aberdeenshire, Scotland

Laurencekirk Scottish Gaelic: Eaglais Labhrainn
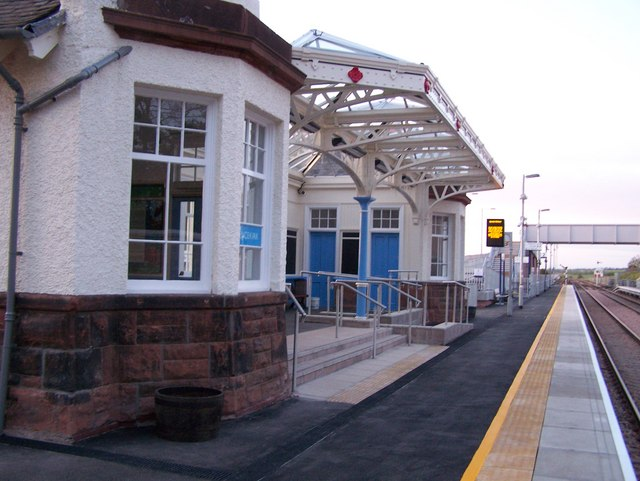
- Laurencekirk station after restoration and reopening

General information
- Location: Laurencekirk, Aberdeenshire; Scotland
- Coordinates: 56.8368°N 2.4653°W
- Grid reference: NO717718
- Manager: ScotRail
- Platforms: 2

Other information
- Station code: LAU
- Classification: DfT category F1

History
- Original company: Aberdeen Railway
- Pre-grouping: Caledonian Railway
- Post-grouping: LMS

Key dates
- 1 November 1849: Opened
- 4 September 1967: Closed
- 17 May 2009: Re-opened

Passengers
- 2020/21: ▼8,778
- 2021/22: ▲45,386
- 2022/23: ▲60,670
- 2023/24: ▲80,682
- 2024/25: ▲87,390

Listed Building – Category B
- Designated: 8 March 2001
- Reference no.: LB47653
Location
Notes
- Passenger statistics from the Office of Rail and Road

Laurencekirk railway station is a railway station serving the communities of Laurencekirk and The Mearns in Aberdeenshire, Scotland. The station was reopened on 17 May 2009 at a cost of £3 million. It is between Montrose and Stonehaven, on the Dundee to Aberdeen line. There is a crossover at the north end of the station, which can be used to facilitate trains turning back if the line south to Montrose is blocked.

== History ==
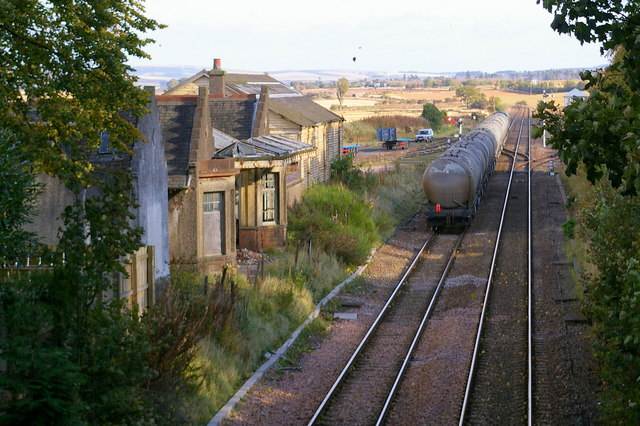
A freight train passing the site of the former station in 2008 before construction started to reopen it

The station was opened on 1 November 1849 by the Aberdeen Railway, which ran from Aberdeen in the north to Guthrie (just outside Arbroath) to the south. The line joined the North British, Arbroath and Montrose Railway north of Montrose at Kinnaber Junction and Arbroath and Forfar Railway at the triangular junctions at Friockheim and Guthrie. The station was closed on 4 September 1967 by British Railways.

=== Re-opening ===
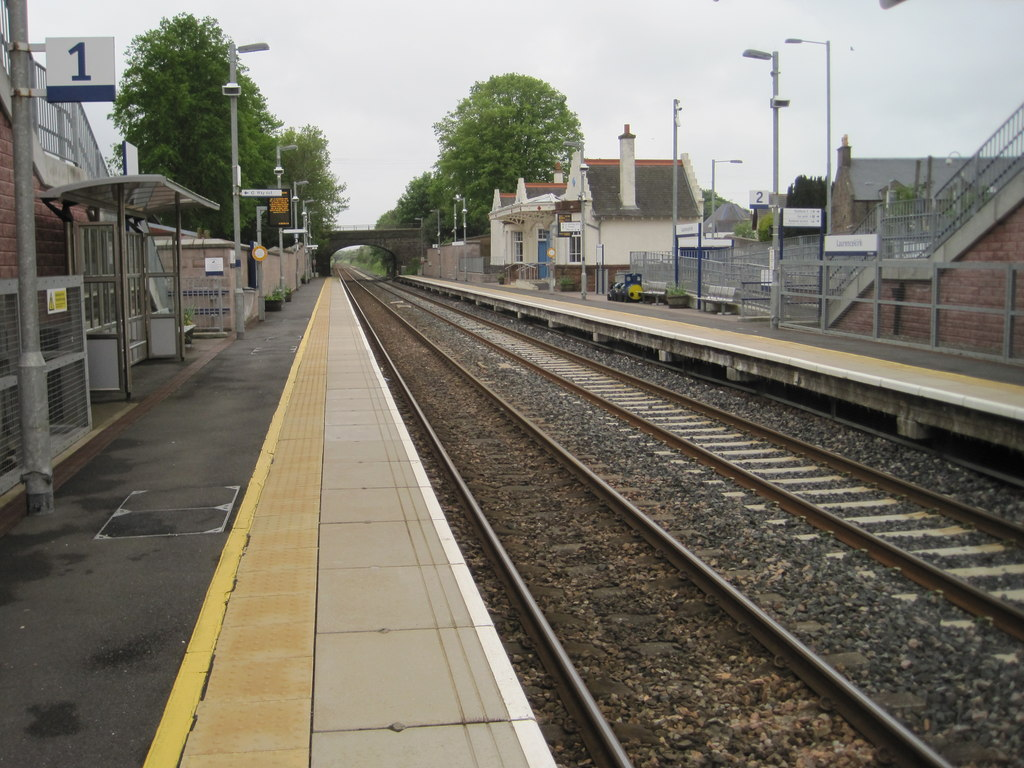
The modern station seen in 2014

The residents of Laurencekirk, many of whom commuted to Aberdeen and Dyce successfully campaigned for the station to be reopened – the official announcement being made during December 2006 that the station would open in December 2007, to be funded by Transport Scotland and the Regional Transport Partnership Nestrans. The announcement of December 2007 for the re-commencement of services to and from Laurencekirk was ultimately overly ambitious and it was announced in early 2008 that the station would be finished and ready for the December 2008 timetable change. However, in a New Release from Transport Scotland, the opening date was given at Spring 2009. The station was reopened by the Minister for Transport, Infrastructure & Climate Change, Stewart Stevenson on 17 May 2009.

The station building, which had fallen into poor overall condition was refurbished during Spring 2008, and a new car park with 70 parking spaces was built by Aberdeenshire Council and Nestrans, across the railway line from the station building, together with a small number of disabled parking spaces next to the station building. First ScotRail made provisional plans for 19 trains to serve the station each day, made up of 10 northbound services and 9 southbound services, with southbound services serving both Edinburgh and Glasgow.

On the first anniversary of the reopening of the station, it was revealed that almost double the expected number of passengers had used it – 64,000 people as opposed to a projection of 36,000.

== Facilities ==
Although the station is unstaffed, both platforms are equipped with shelters and benches. Platform 1 also has a help point and is adjacent to the car park, whilst platform 2 has a ticket machine. Both platforms have step-free access, and are connected by a footbridge, which also has a ramp. Both platforms have a smartcard reader.

== Passenger volume ==
Passenger Volume at Laurencekirk
	2009–10	2010–11	2011–12	2012–13	2013–14	2014–15	2015–16	2016–17	2017–18	2018–19	2019–20	2020–21	2021–22	2022–23	2023–24	2024–25
Entries and exits	56,496	73,594	86,138	92,470	102,770	112,914	104,488	96,002	95,848	86,332	88,566	8,778	45,386	60,670	80,682	87,390

The statistics cover twelve month periods that start in April.

== Services ==
As of the May 2026 timetable, Laurencekirk is served by an approximately hourly stopping service which runs between Montrose and Inverurie. In addition, some services also extend to Edinburgh Waverley or Glasgow Queen Street southbound, and Inverness northbound, although most terminate at Aberdeen. A reduced service operates on Sundays, northbound to Aberdeen and southbound to Glasgow Queen Street and Edinburgh Waverley.

Preceding station	National Rail	Following station
Montrose	ScotRail; Dundee–Aberdeen line	Stonehaven
Montrose; Terminus	ScotRail; Aberdeen Crossrail	Stonehaven; Towards Inverurie
	Historical railways	
Marykirk; Line open; station closed	Caledonian Railway; Aberdeen Railway	Fordoun; Line open; station closed

== Bibliography ==
- Awdry, Christopher (1990). Encyclopaedia of British Railway Companies. Sparkford: Patrick Stephens Ltd. ISBN 1-8526-0049-7. OCLC 19514063. CN 8983.
- Brailsford, Martyn, ed. (December 2017) [1987]. Railway Track Diagrams 1: Scotland & Isle of Man (6th ed.). Frome: Trackmaps. ISBN 978-0-9549866-9-8.
- Butt, R. V. J. (October 1995). The Directory of Railway Stations: details every public and private passenger station, halt, platform and stopping place, past and present (1st ed.). Sparkford: Patrick Stephens Ltd. ISBN 978-1-85260-508-7. OCLC 60251199. OL 11956311M.
- Jowett, Alan (March 1989). Jowett's Railway Atlas of Great Britain and Ireland: From Pre-Grouping to the Present Day (1st ed.). Sparkford: Patrick Stephens Ltd. ISBN 978-1-85260-086-0. OCLC 22311137.
- Quick, Michael (2022). Railway Passenger Stations in Great Britain: A Chronology (PDF) (5th ed.). London: Railway and Canal Historical Society.
