= Arbroath Lady Loan railway station =

Disused railway station in Arbroath, Angus

Coordinates: 56.5551°N 2.5869°W

Arbroath Lady Loan

General information
- Location: Arbroath, Angus; Scotland

Other information
- Status: Disused

History
- Original company: Dundee and Arbroath Railway
- Pre-grouping: Dundee and Arbroath Railway

Key dates
- 8 October 1838: Opened
- 1 February 1848: Closed
Location

Arbroath Lady Loan railway station served the town of Arbroath, Angus, Scotland from 1838 to 1848 on the Dundee and Arbroath Railway.

== History ==
The station opened on 8 October 1838 on the Dundee and Arbroath Railway. It was situated west of the harbour, which opened a year later. It had a locomotive shed and a turntable. The tramway that it used couldn't be upgraded to a railway so it closed when the new Arbroath station opened on 1 February 1848.

Preceding station	Historical railways	Following station
Terminus	Dundee and Arbroath Railway	Elliot Junction; Line open, station closed
