= Newtonhill railway station =

Former railway station in Scotland

Newtonhill
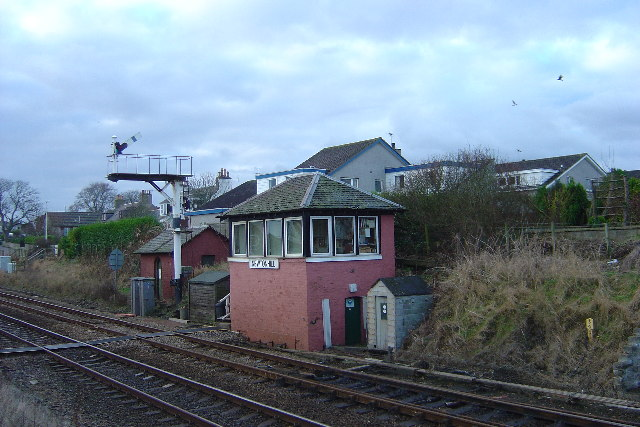
- Newtonhill signal box

General information
- Location: Newtonhill, Aberdeenshire; Scotland
- Coordinates: 57.0324°N 2.1494°W
- Platforms: 2

Other information
- Status: Disused

History
- Original company: Aberdeen Railway
- Pre-grouping: Caledonian Railway
- Post-grouping: LMS

Key dates
- 1849: Opened
- 1956: Closed
Location

Newtonhill railway station served the town of Newtonhill in Aberdeenshire, Scotland, United Kingdom from its opening in 1849 to its closure in 1956. Newtonhill signal box continued to operate until 2019.

There have been several calls for this station to reopen in recent years. In May 2020, Transport Scotland awarded the local transport body £80,000 to fund a feasibility study into the reopening of Newtonhill railway station, the preliminary report was published in January 2024.

In February 2024 the regional transport partnership Nestrans announced that potential new rail stations at Cove and Newtonhill are to be examined in more detail as work continues to identify improvements to sustainable travel between Aberdeen and Laurencekirk. It is expected that the completed Detailed Options Appraisal will be reported to the Nestrans board later in 2024.

Preceding station	Historical railways	Following station
Portlethen; Line and station open	Caledonian Railway; Aberdeen Railway	Muchalls; Line open; Station closed
