= Aberdeen Crossrail =

Railway in Aberdeenshire, Scotland

Overview
- Status: In service
- Owner: National Rail
- Locale: Aberdeen City and Aberdeenshire, Scotland
- Termini: Inverurie, Montrose
- Stations: 8

Service
- System: Heavy rail
- Operator: ScotRail

History
- Opened: 2018

Technical
- Track gauge: 4 ft 8 1/2 in (1,435 mm)

Aberdeen Crossrail provides a cross-city railway service between Inverurie, Aberdeen, Stonehaven and Montrose in Aberdeenshire, Scotland. It was opened in 2018.

First proposed in the 2003 Scottish Strategic Rail Study, it was supported by Nestrans, the north-east of Scotland's regional transport partnership. The Crossrail project upgraded existing services between Aberdeen to Inverurie to an hourly service, adding more services between Aberdeen and Stonehaven, and opening new stations along existing lines in Aberdeen City and Aberdeenshire.

== History ==
=== Proposal ===
The project aimed to have a service between Inverurie, Aberdeen and Stonehaven every 15 minutes, with reopening of stations at Kintore, Altens and Newtonhill.

The project was seen as vital in reducing traffic congestion in and around Aberdeen. It was noted that only 12% of north-east residents lived within 0.6 mi (1 km) of a railway station; if all of the Crossrail proposals were to go ahead, this may rise to 25%. This would aid commuting into the city centre and provide a viable alternative to using cars.

=== Feasibility studies ===
The Scottish Executive began a £400,000 feasibility study into the project in June 2005; the outcome was expected to be announced by March 2007. A document published in 2010 reported that the predicted costs would be greater than the additional ticket revenues generated for the Crossrail project, regardless of whether services ran at a 15- or 30-minute frequency.

This feasibility study into the project indicated that Crossrail could best be delivered on an incremental basis. Nestrans' Draft Rail Action Plan 2010-21 considered how to achieve frequency and service improvements in the short term, leading to the opening of new stations - such as at Kintore - and more significant service enhancements over time.

Network Rail has completed a GRIP2 study to investigate options for Aberdeen - Inverness line improvements, including consideration of a new station at Kintore; the report was published on 22 March 2011, which confirmed that an hourly service frequency and two hour journey time would be feasible. The Stage 3 study examining the range of options in greater detail was completed during 2012.

=== Implementation ===
Laurencekirk railway station was reopened in May 2009.

Transport Scotland announced in March 2016 that the scheme would go ahead, as part of a wider timetable recast in 2018. The new service would run between Inverurie and Montrose, serving all existing intermediate stations, with one at Kintore from 2019; this was later rescheduled to May 2020.

In 2019, a £170 million project delivered improvements to the line between Aberdeen and Inverurie to allow for a higher service frequency.

Kintore railway station reopened in October 2020.

== Service ==
ScotRail operates hourly services in each direction on the Aberdeen Crossrail service between Inverurie and Montrose; these take around 70 minutes.

== See also ==
- Edinburgh Crossrail
- Crossrail Glasgow
