= Arbroath railway station =

Railway station in Angus, Scotland

Arbroath Scottish Gaelic: Obar Bhrothaig
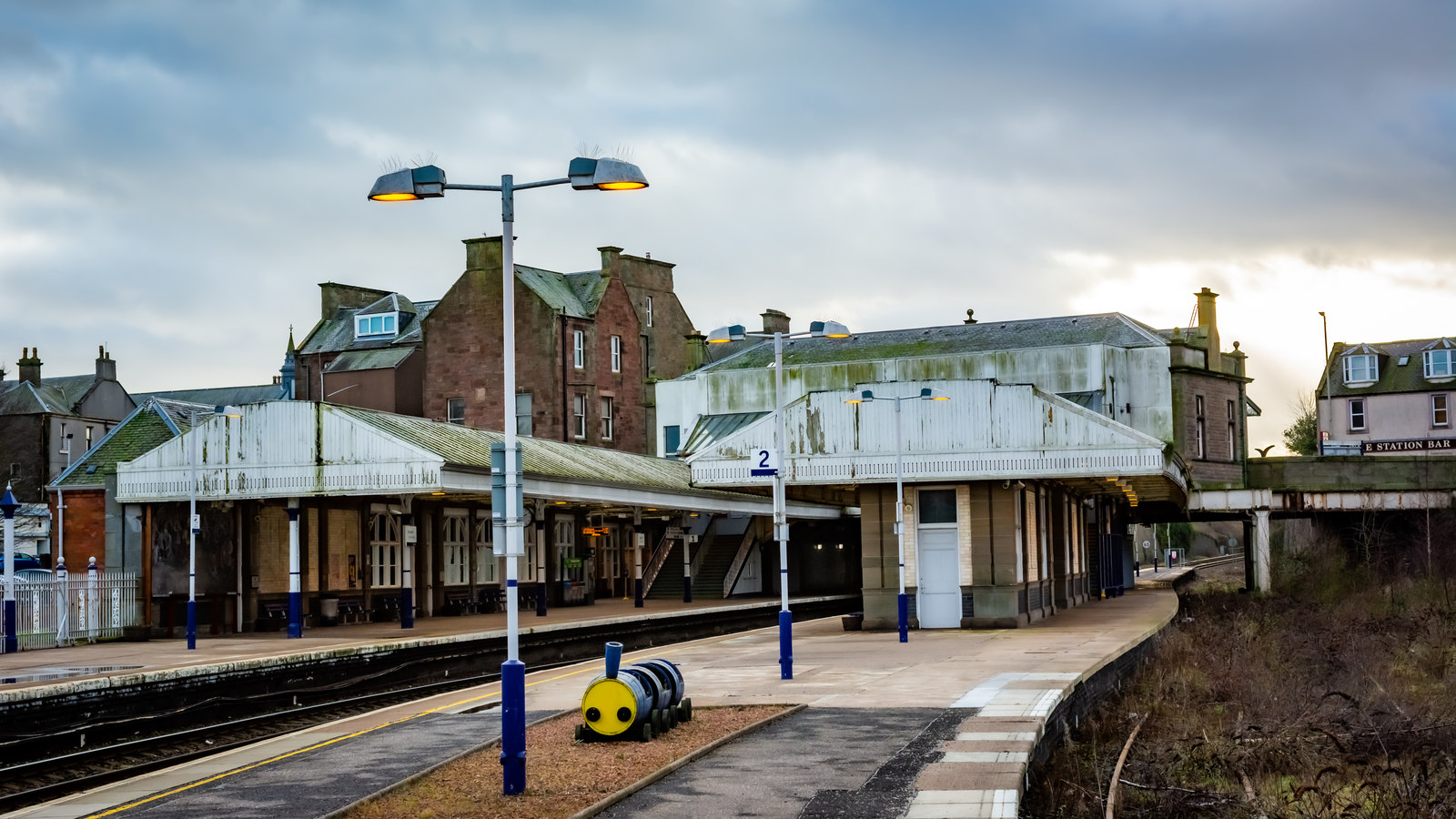
- The station seen in 2020

General information
- Location: Arbroath, Angus; Scotland
- Coordinates: 56.5594°N 2.5892°W
- Grid reference: NO638409
- Managed by: ScotRail
- Platforms: 2

Other information
- Station code: ARB

History
- Original company: Dundee and Arbroath Railway

Key dates
- 1 February 1848: Opened

Passengers
- 2020/21: ▼53,058
- Interchange: ▼1,137
- 2021/22: ▲0.229 million
- Interchange: ▲8,605
- 2022/23: ▲0.293 million
- Interchange: ▲14,504
- 2023/24: ▲0.359 million
- Interchange: ▼2,142
- 2024/25: ▲0.362 million
- Interchange: ▲2,708
Location
Notes
- Passenger statistics from the Office of Rail and Road

Arbroath railway station serves the town of Arbroath in Angus, Scotland. The station is 17 miles (27 km) east of Dundee on the line between Dundee and Aberdeen, between Carnoustie and Montrose. There are two crossovers at the north end of the station, which can be used to facilitate trains turning back if the line south to Carnoustie is blocked. ScotRail, who manage the station, provide most of the services, along with CrossCountry, London North Eastern Railway and Caledonian Sleeper.

== History ==
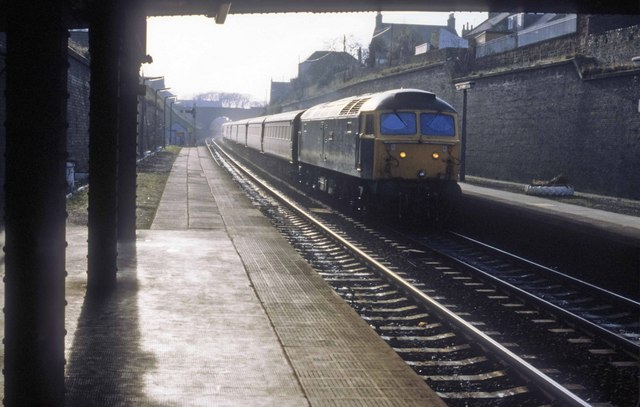
A northbound inter-city train arriving in 1981

There have been three stations called Arbroath, two of which closed in 1848: Arbroath Catherine Street served the Arbroath and Forfar Railway and Arbroath Lady Loan (or Arbroath West) was on the Dundee and Arbroath Railway. The current station was originally opened by the Dundee and Arbroath Railway on 1 February 1848, albeit temporarily, as it was opened permanently on 14 December 1858 as a link station to connect the Arbroath and Forfar Railway with the Dundee and Arbroath Railway. On 1 October 1880, the North British, Arbroath and Montrose Railway opened north towards Montrose.

== Facilities ==
The station building is built above the railway line and platforms, and contains the ticket office, lifts to platforms and toilets. Outside is a taxi rank drop-off point. Each of the platforms has a waiting room, a help point and a bench, whilst platform 1 also has a ticket machine, which is adjacent to the car park.

== Passenger volume ==
The main origin or destination station for journeys to or from Arbroath in the 2022–23 period was Dundee, making up 115,522 of the 293,274 journeys (39.4%).

Passenger Volume at Arbroath
	2004–05	2005–06	2006–07	2007–08	2008–09	2009–10	2010–11	2011–12	2012–13	2013–14	2014–15	2015–16	2016–17	2017–18	2018–19	2019–20	2020–21	2021–22	2022–23	2023–24	2024–25
Entries and exits	373,219	396,979	393,408	427,820	410,162	393,310	404,212	398,892	388,320	388,612	392,994	383,102	361,038	367,468	369,906	377,582	53,058	229,364	293,274	359,108	362,306
Interchanges	171	195	96	473	117	75	104	188	527	777	800	916	1,185	2,396	27,230	17,952	1,137	8,605	14,504	2,142	2,708

The statistics cover twelve month periods that start in April.

== Services ==
There are generally two or three trains per hour westbound to Dundee and eastbound to Aberdeen, with hourly services onwards from Dundee towards Edinburgh and Glasgow Queen Street. London North Eastern Railway services to London King's Cross and CrossCountry routes towards England also stop at Arbroath. On Sundays there is generally an hourly service in each direction.

Preceding station	National Rail	Following station
Dundee	CrossCountry; Cross Country Route	Montrose
Dundee	London North Eastern Railway; Northern Lights (London – Aberdeen)	Montrose
Carnoustie	ScotRail; Dundee–Aberdeen line	Montrose
Carnoustie	Caledonian Sleeper; Highland Caledonian Sleeper	Montrose
	Historical railways	
Elliot Junction; Line open; Station Closed	CR & NBR; Dundee and Arbroath Railway	Link line station
Link line station	Caledonian Railway; Arbroath and Forfar Railway	Colliston; Line partially open; Station closed
Link line station	North British Railway; North British, Arbroath and Montrose Railway	Letham Grange; Line open; Station closed

== Bibliography ==
- Awdry, Christopher (1990). Encyclopaedia of British Railway Companies. Sparkford: Patrick Stephens Ltd. ISBN 1-8526-0049-7. OCLC 19514063. CN 8983.
- Brailsford, Martyn, ed. (December 2017) [1987]. Railway Track Diagrams 1: Scotland & Isle of Man (6th ed.). Frome: Trackmaps. ISBN 978-0-9549866-9-8.
- Butt, R. V. J. (October 1995). The Directory of Railway Stations: details every public and private passenger station, halt, platform and stopping place, past and present (1st ed.). Sparkford: Patrick Stephens Ltd. ISBN 978-1-85260-508-7. OCLC 60251199. OL 11956311M.
- Jowett, Alan (March 1989). Jowett's Railway Atlas of Great Britain and Ireland: From Pre-Grouping to the Present Day (1st ed.). Sparkford: Patrick Stephens Ltd. ISBN 978-1-85260-086-0. OCLC 22311137.
- Quick, Michael (2022). Railway Passenger Stations in Great Britain: A Chronology (PDF) (5th ed.). London: Railway and Canal Historical Society.
