= Montrose railway station =

Railway station in Angus, Scotland

Montrose Scottish Gaelic: Mon Rois
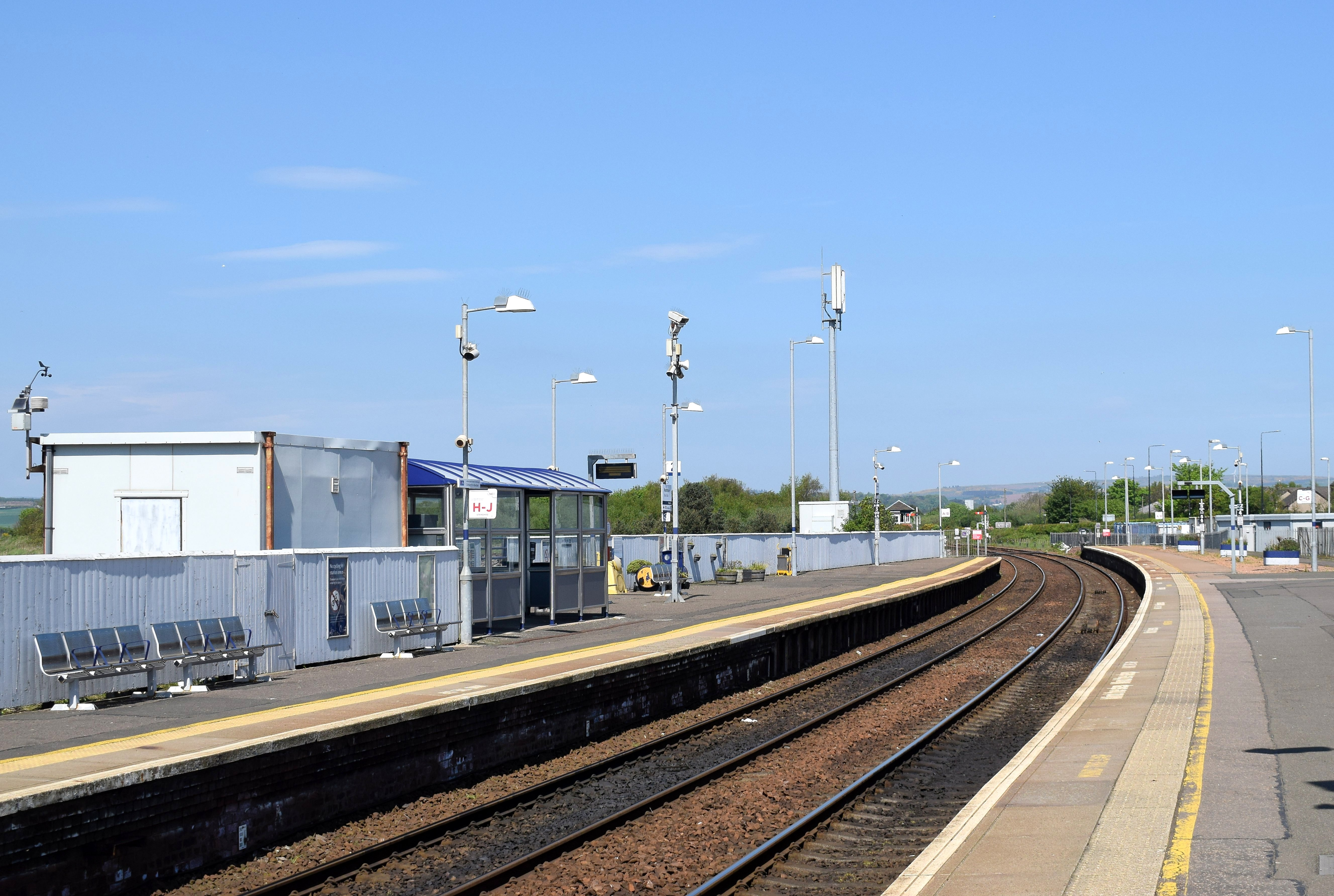
- Montrose station in 2024

General information
- Location: Montrose, Angus, Scotland
- Coordinates: 56.7129°N 2.4722°W
- Grid reference: NO711579
- Manager: ScotRail
- Platforms: 2

Other information
- Station code: MTS

Key dates
- 1 May 1883: Opened

Passengers
- 2020/21: ▼35,086
- 2021/22: ▲0.188 million
- 2022/23: ▲0.244 million
- 2023/24: ▲0.311 million
- 2024/25: ▲0.317 million
Location
Notes
- Passenger statistics from the Office of Rail and Road

Montrose railway station serves the town of Montrose, in Angus, Scotland. The station overlooks the Montrose Basin and is situated on the Dundee–Aberdeen line, 90 miles (145 km) north of Edinburgh Waverley, between Arbroath and Laurencekirk. There is a crossover at the north end of the station, which can be used to facilitate trains turning back if the line south to Arbroath is blocked.

== History ==
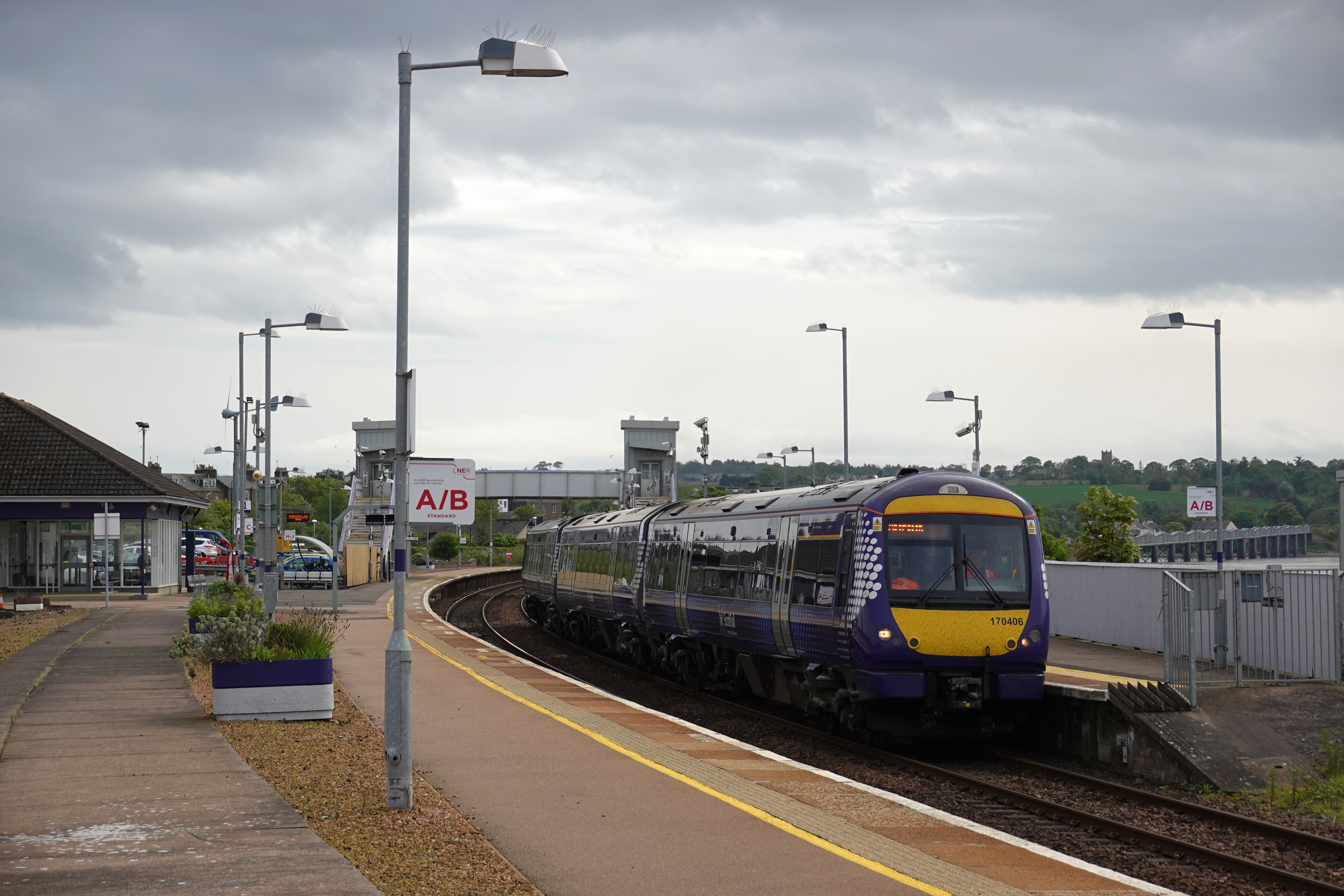
A Class 170 diesel multiple unit calling at the northbound platform

The current station was opened on 1 May 1883 by the North British Railway on their North British, Arbroath and Montrose Railway route linking Arbroath with the Scottish North Eastern Railway main line through Strathmore at Kinnaber Junction. A comparison of the first and second editions of the six-inch Ordnance Survey maps illustrates the changes brought about by the railway.

The station has had several names: it was renamed to Montrose Central in the early days of British Rail, before being changed to Montrose East in 1952, and finally reverting to Montrose in 1961.

The station was host to a London, Midland and Scottish Railway camping coach in 1936, followed by three more in 1937-39.

Until recently, the section was worked by signal boxes at each end (Usan and Montrose South) using tokenless block regulations. However, a 2010 resignalling scheme saw both boxes closed and control was transferred to the former Montrose North box; this now supervises the entire area including the single line over the viaduct. The work also made the southbound platform at the station bi-directional.

The current station building was opened by Councillor W.K. Fitzgerald, the Convenor of Tayside Regional Council, on 30 July 1984. It won a first class award in 1984, as part of the Best Restored Station competition.

In 2024, disused land that previously housed railway sidings was listed for sale.

== Facilities ==
The station is equipped with a ticket office, toilets, a car park, bike racks and a payphone adjacent to platform 1. Both platforms have benches and help points, platform 2 also has a shelter; they are linked by a step-free access footbridge.

== Passenger volume ==
Passenger volume at Montrose (Note: The statistics cover 12-month periods commencing in April.)
	2004–05	2005–06	2006–07	2007–08	2008–09	2009–10	2010–11	2011–12	2012–13	2013–14	2014–15	2015–16	2016–17	2017–18	2018–19	2019–20	2020–21	2021–22	2022–23	2023–24	2024–25
Entries and exits	319,072	345,974	348,029	369,377	365,922	355,978	378,284	386,600	390,140	396,209	404,136	388,864	354,190	350,126	337,860	333,808	35,086	188,344	243,796	311,448	317,406

== Services ==
The station is served by four train operating companies:

- ScotRail trains stop here regularly on both the Glasgow Queen Street and Edinburgh Waverley to Aberdeen routes; certain Aberdeen trains are extended to Inverness. Approximately hourly trains run to Inverurie, as part of an Aberdeen Crossrail plan to see hourly trains through the city
- London North Eastern Railway operates three daily services trains to London King's Cross, with one to Leeds
- CrossCountry operates two daily southbound trains: one to Plymouth and the other to Edinburgh
- Scottish Rail Holdings operates the overnight Caledonian Sleeper service to/from London Euston.

Preceding station	National Rail	Following station
Arbroath	Caledonian Sleeper; Highland Caledonian Sleeper	Stonehaven
Arbroath	CrossCountry; Cross Country Route; Southbound only	Stonehaven
Arbroath	London North Eastern Railway; East Coast Main Line	Stonehaven
Arbroath	ScotRail; Dundee–Aberdeen line	Laurencekirk
Terminus	ScotRail; Aberdeen Crossrail	Laurencekirk; To Inverurie
	Historical railways	
Lunan Bay; Line open; Station closed	North British, Arbroath and Montrose Railway	Hillside; Line open; Station closed
Terminus	Montrose and Bervie Railway	Broomfield; Line closed; Station closed
