= Inverurie railway station =

Railway station in Aberdeenshire, Scotland

Inverurie Scottish Gaelic: Inbhir Uaraidh
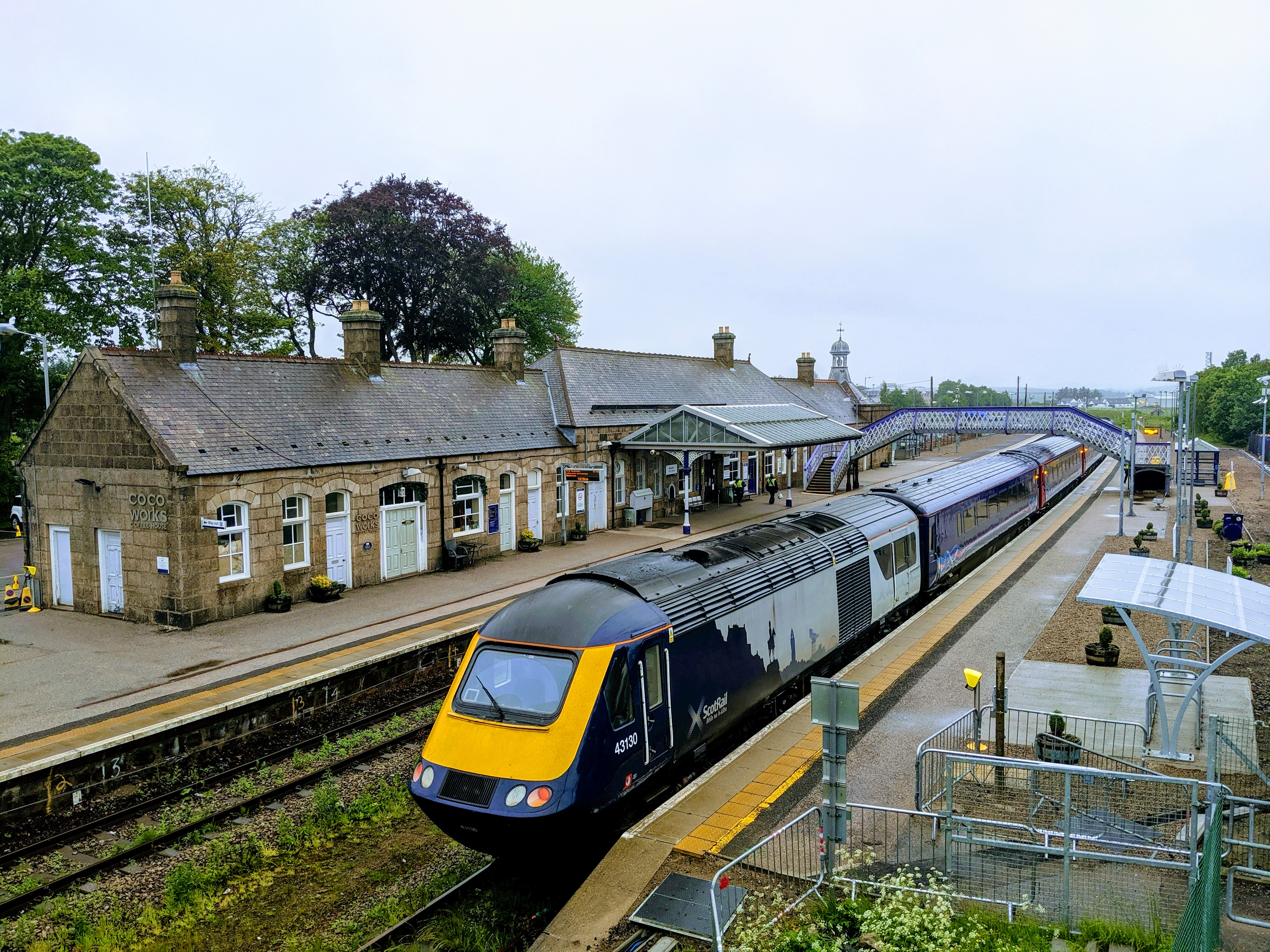
- A ScotRail HST at the station (2019)

General information
- Location: Inverurie, Aberdeenshire, Scotland
- Coordinates: 57.2867°N 2.3737°W
- Grid reference: NJ775217
- Manager: ScotRail
- Platforms: 2

Other information
- Station code: INR

History
- Pre-grouping: Great North of Scotland Railway

Key dates
- 20 September 1854: Opened as Inverury
- 1 May 1866: Renamed
- 10 February 1902: Resited 880 yd (805 m) north

Passengers
- 2020/21: ▼78,358
- 2021/22: ▲0.242 million
- 2022/23: ▲0.288 million
- 2023/24: ▲0.358 million
- 2024/25: ▲0.360 million

Listed Building – Category B
- Designated: 18 May 1999
- Reference no.: LB46174
Location
Notes
- Passenger statistics from the Office of Rail and Road

Inverurie railway station serves the town of Inverurie, in Aberdeenshire, Scotland. It is managed by ScotRail and is on the Aberdeen to Inverness Line, which is mostly single tracked north of this point, between Kintore and Insch. The station lies 16 mi 72 ch (16.9 mi; 27.2 km) from Aberdeen.

== History ==
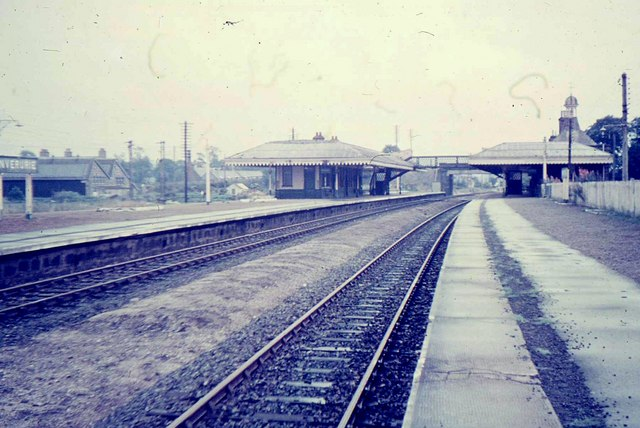
The station in 1971

The first station, then called Inverury, was opened on 20 September 1854 on the Great North of Scotland Railway main line, which ran between Aberdeen Waterloo and Keith. It was situated 880 yards (805 m) south of the present station. In 1856, it became the junction station for the new Inverury and Old Meldrum Junction Railway branch line to Oldmeldrum.

Renamed Inverurie in 1866, it was replaced in 1902 with a new building with three platforms at the present location close to the Inverurie Locomotive Works, which was then being built.

The station ceased to be a junction station in 1931 when the branch line was closed to passengers, although freight traffic continued until 1966.

The station building is Category B listed; it is single storey and has a cupola with a wind vane.

=== Inverury and Old Meldrum Junction Railway ===
The branch line to Oldmeldrum was opened by the Inverury and Old Meldrum Junction Railway company in 1856 and ran via Lethenty to Old Meldrum station, as it was then called. A proposed extension to the Banff, Macduff and Turriff Junction Railway was considered, but was never built. The line was closed for passengers in 1931.

Service frequencies improved here from 2018 as part of the timetable recast funded by Transport Scotland. A new Aberdeen Crossrail commuter service was introduced from here to Montrose, which calls at all intermediate stations en route once per hour. There are now at least two departures each hour to Aberdeen, with the existing through services to Inverness, Edinburgh and Glasgow maintained or increased in number. A £170 million project between June and August 2019 upgraded the Aberdeen to Inverness route, which was redoubled.

== Facilities ==
Both platforms are equipped with shelters, help points and benches. Platform 1 also has a staffed ticket office, a ticket machine, separate waiting room and bike racks, which is also adjacent to the car park. There is a step-free access path at the end of the platforms, although there is also a footbridge in the centre of the station.

== Passenger volume ==
Passenger Volume at Inverurie (Note: The statistics cover twelve month periods that start in April.)
	2004–05	2005–06	2006–07	2007–08	2008–09	2009–10	2010–11	2011–12	2012–13	2013–14	2014–15	2015–16	2016–17	2017–18	2018–19	2019–20	2020–21	2021–22	2022–23	2023–24	2024–25
Entries and exits	127,779	154,103	175,934	195,139	223,566	292,408	345,790	403,950	451,854	501,646	534,462	533,972	511,708	488,950	355,824	339,064	78,358	242,450	288,356	358,140	359,792

== Services ==
ScotRail operates the following general off-peak services in trains per hour (tph):

Inter7City

- 1 tp2h to Aberdeen
- 1 tp2h to Inverness

Aberdeen Crossrail

- 1 tph to Aberdeen
- 1 tp2h to Montrose; one per day continues to Edinburgh Waverley.

Preceding station	National Rail	Following station
Kintore	ScotRail; Aberdeen to Inverness Line	Insch
Kintore to Montrose	ScotRail; Aberdeen Crossrail	Terminus
	Historical railways	
Kintore; Line and station open	Great North of Scotland Railway; GNoSR Main Line	Inveramsay; Line open, station closed
Terminus	Great North of Scotland Railway; Inverury and Old Meldrum Junction Railway	Lethenty
