= Monifieth railway station =

Railway station in Angus, Scotland

Monifieth Scottish Gaelic: Monadh Fotha
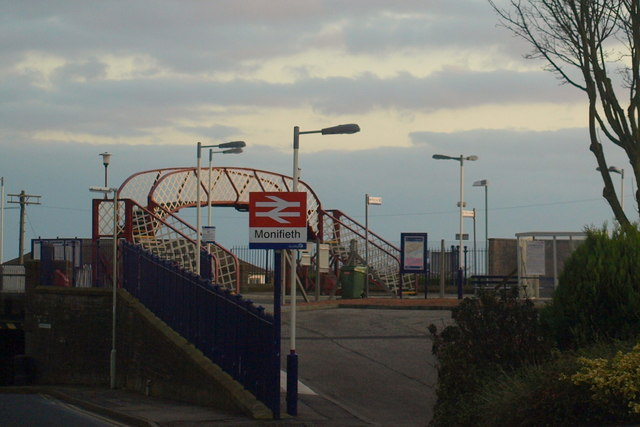

General information
- Location: Monifieth, Angus; Scotland
- Coordinates: 56.4799°N 2.8175°W
- Grid reference: NO497322
- Manager: ScotRail
- Platforms: 2

Other information
- Station code: MON
- Classification: DfT category F2

History
- Original company: Dundee and Arbroath Railway

Key dates
- 6 October 1838: Station opened

Passengers
- 2021/22: ▲17,898
- 2022/23: ▲24,368
- 2023/24: ▲35,392
- 2024/25: ▲43,194
- 2025/26: ▲50,862
Location
Notes
- Passenger statistics from the Office of Rail and Road

Monifieth railway station serves the town of Monifieth near Dundee, Scotland. It is sited 5 miles 72 chains (9.5 kilometres) from the former Dundee East station, on the Dundee to Aberdeen line, between Balmossie and Barry Links. ScotRail, who manage the station, operate all services.

== History ==
The station was opened on 6 October 1838 on the 5ft 6in gauge (1676mm) Dundee and Arbroath Railway. The station had two platforms, one on each side of a double track running line. The goods yard was to the north of the station. The railway changed to standard gauge in 1847.

A camping coach was positioned here by the Scottish Region from 1956 to 1966, with two coaches here for the last two years.

== Facilities ==
Both platforms have shelters and benches. Platform 1 has a payphone and help point, whilst platform 2 is equipped with cycle racks. Both platforms have step-free access, but the footbridge which links them is not step-free. As there are no facilities to purchase tickets, passengers must buy one in advance, or from the guard on the train.

== Passenger volume ==
Passenger Volume at Monifieth
	2004–05	2005–06	2006–07	2007–08	2008–09	2009–10	2010–11	2011–12	2012–13	2013–14	2014–15	2015–16	2016–17	2017–18	2018–19	2019–20	2020–21	2021–22	2022–23	2023–24	2024–25
Entries and exits	1,333	1,757	1,897	2,106	2,082	1,170	1,288	2,398	2,570	3,122	4,680	6,654	5,830	5,942	9,224	21,710	2,886	17,898	24,368	35,392	43,194

The statistics cover twelve month periods that start in April.

== Services ==
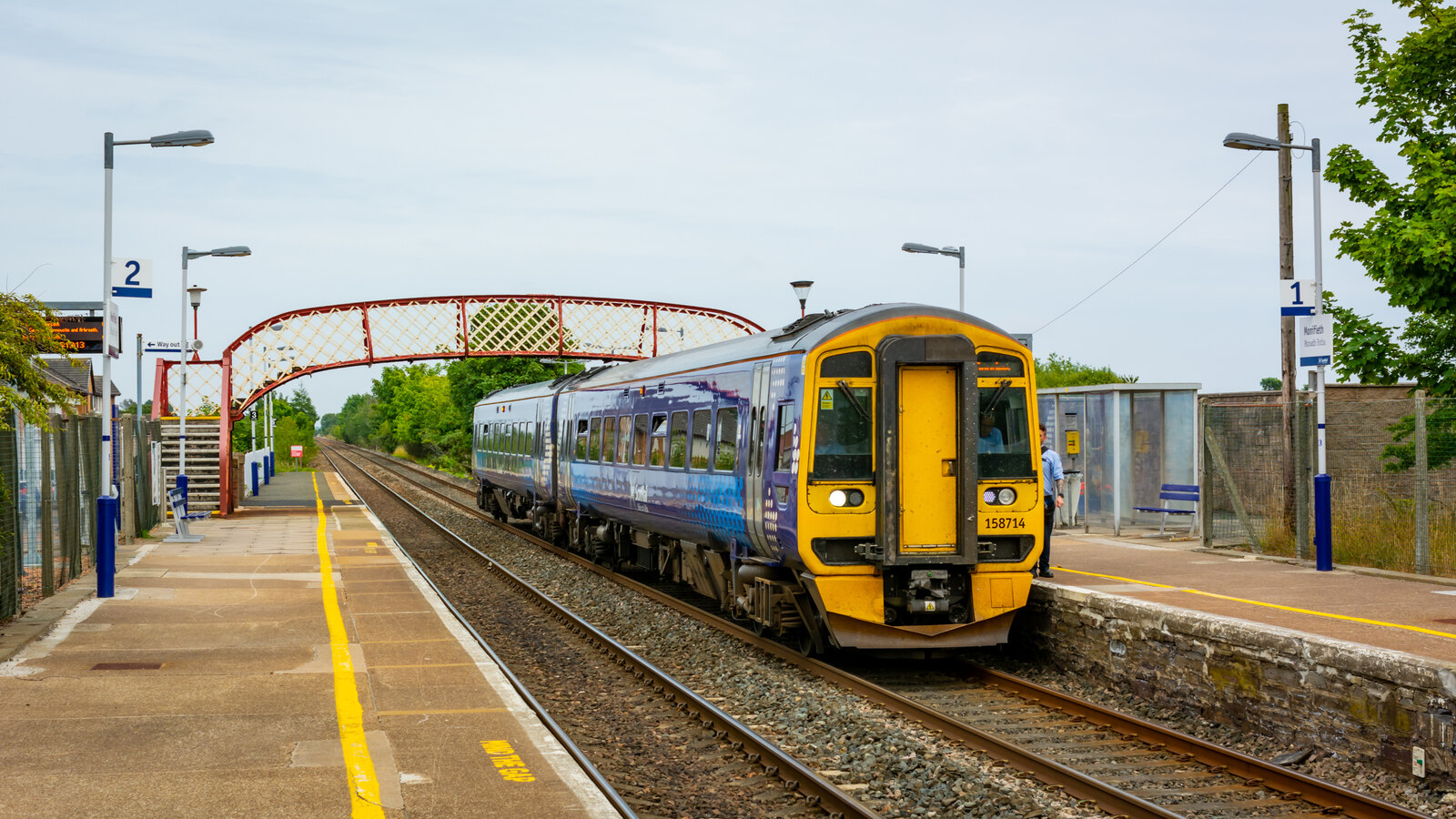
A Dundee-bound train at the station

British Rail operated a local passenger service to the intermediate stations between Dundee and Arbroath until May 1990. Since these were discontinued, most of the intermediate stations have had only a very sparse service. In 2012, however, the number of services calling here increased from 2 per day to 6 per day from the December timetable change, unlike the other stations in the area (particularly Balmossie, Barry Links and Golf Street).

In the May 2026 timetable, there is an approximately hourly service in each direction to Dundee and Arbroath. There is no Sunday service.

In 2022, a number of people campaigned for the service - which currently terminates at Dundee - to be extended to Edinburgh, to avoid missing onward connections at Dundee.

Preceding station	National Rail	Following station
Balmossie or Broughty Ferry	ScotRail; Dundee–Aberdeen line Mondays-Saturdays only	Barry Links or Carnoustie
	Historical railways	
Broughty Ferry; Line and Station open	Dundee and Arbroath Railway	Buddon; Line open; Station closed

== Bibliography ==
- Butt, R. V. J. (October 1995). The Directory of Railway Stations: details every public and private passenger station, halt, platform and stopping place, past and present (1st ed.). Sparkford: Patrick Stephens Ltd. ISBN 978-1-85260-508-7. OCLC 60251199. OL 11956311M.
- Jowett, Alan (March 1989). Jowett's Railway Atlas of Great Britain and Ireland: From Pre-Grouping to the Present Day (1st ed.). Sparkford: Patrick Stephens Ltd. ISBN 978-1-85260-086-0. OCLC 22311137.
