= List of least used railway stations of Great Britain =

List of British railway stations with very low usage

Least Used Station for 2025/26 period (current) Reddish South
- A train approaching Reddish South in 2013

General information
- Location: Metropolitan Borough of Stockport, Greater Manchester; England
- Grid reference: SJ895932
- Manager: Northern Trains
- Platforms: 1

Other information
- Station code: RDS

Key dates
- 1849 or 1852: Opened
- 19 November 2026: Announced as least used station

Passengers
- 2024/25: ▼102
- 2025/26: ▼94

A least used station is a station that received the fewest entries/exits (described as a passenger) as defined by Office of Rail and Road (ORR) in a given timeframe. These statistics are released by the ORR every November, December or January, for the previous financial year.

== Overview ==
This table shows the top least used stations of every period covered in this page. Data is only available from April 1997 onwards.

Overview of the least used stations of Great Britain
Period	Station name	Location	Passengers	Notes
2025/26	Reddish South	Greater Manchester	94	
2024/25	Elton and Orston	Nottinghamshire	68	
2023/24	Denton	Greater Manchester	54	Least used station to be open all year twice in a row
2022/23	Teesside Airport	County Durham	2	The service was suspended from May 2022 due to the platform being classified unsafe
2021/22	Heathrow Terminal 4	Greater London	0	Station closed during this period The Covid-19 pandemic partially affected these statistics
2021/22	Elton & Orston	Nottinghamshire	40	Least used station with more than 0 passengers
2020/21	Sugar Loaf	Powys	0	The six stations drew in this period The Covid-19 pandemic severely affected these statistics
2020/21	Stanlow and Thornton	Cheshire	0	The six stations drew in this period The Covid-19 pandemic severely affected these statistics
2020/21	Sampford Courtenay	Devon	0	The six stations drew in this period The Covid-19 pandemic severely affected these statistics
2020/21	Llanbedr	Gwynedd	0	The six stations drew in this period The Covid-19 pandemic severely affected these statistics
2020/21	Beasdale	Highland	0	The six stations drew in this period The Covid-19 pandemic severely affected these statistics
2020/21	Abererch	Gwynedd	0	The six stations drew in this period The Covid-19 pandemic severely affected these statistics
2020/21	Teesside Airport	County Durham	2	Least used station with more than 0 passengers
2019/20	Berney Arms	Norfolk	42	Usage reduced due to line being closed for much of the period
2018/19	Stanlow and Thornton	Cheshire	46	The two stations drew in this period
2018/19	Denton	Greater Manchester	46	The two stations drew in this period
2017/18	Redcar British Steel	Teesside	40	
2016/17	Barry Links	Angus	24	
2015/16	Shippea Hill	Cambridgeshire	12	Was the least used station twice in a row
2014/15	Shippea Hill	Cambridgeshire	22	Was the least used station twice in a row
2013/14	Teesside Airport	County Durham	8	Was the least used station four times in a row
2012/13	Teesside Airport	County Durham	8	Was the least used station four times in a row
2011/12	Teesside Airport	County Durham	14	Was the least used station four times in a row
2010/11	Teesside Airport	County Durham	18	Was the least used station four times in a row
2009/10	Coombe Junction Halt	Cornwall	42	
2008/09	Teesside Airport	County Durham	44	
2007/08	Crosskeys	Caerphilly	8	Station opened during this period
2006/07	Tyndrum Lower	Stirling	17	
2005/06	Gainsborough Central	Lincolnshire	21	Was the least used station twice in a row
2004/05	Gainsborough Central	Lincolnshire	21	Was the least used station twice in a row
2003/04	Statistics were not released for this period. See the section for this period for more details.			
2002/03	Barry Links	Angus	8	The two stations drew in this period
2002/03	Gainsborough Central	Lincolnshire	8	The two stations drew in this period
2001/02	Beauly	Highland	23	Station opened during this period
2000/01	Buckenham	Norfolk	22	
1999/2000	Ditton	Cheshire	1	

== Publicity ==
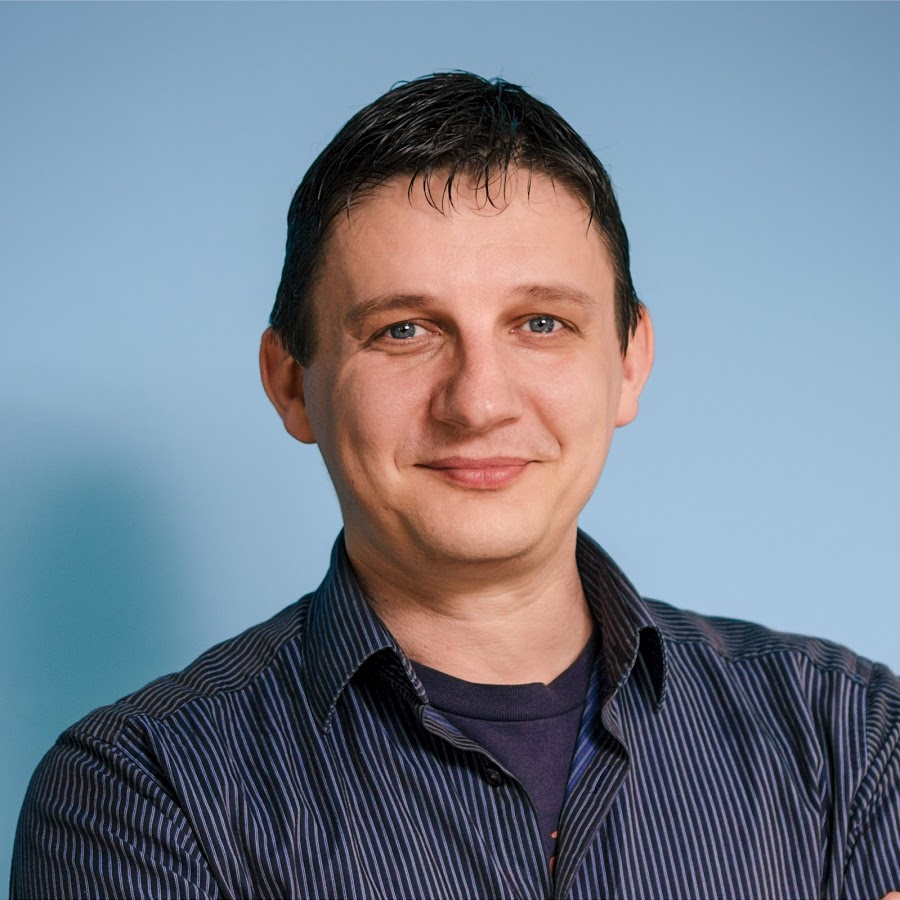
Geoff Marshall

The publicity around these stations is fuelled by the nature of how unusual they are. Railway enthusiasts are known to visit them either to be able to say they have been there, or in order to boost the stations' usage statistics. Geoff Marshall, a YouTuber known for his railway-related content, has a series dedicated to visiting these stations.

There has also been news coverage on a few of the least used stations, for example Berney Arms had an ITV reporter sent to cover it when it was announced in the 2019/20 period.

The Office of Rail and Road acknowledge that by highlighting the least used stations, this impacts the statistics in future years.

== Statistics ==
=== Period between 2025 and 2026 ===
Reddish South railway station was announced as being the least used station, having consistently been ranked within the top 5 least used since 2022/23. The statistics for this year showed the top five least used stations to be:

2025/2026 Period
Position	Station name	Station location	Usage figure
1	Reddish South	Greater Manchester	94
2	Denton	Greater Manchester	100
3	Elton and Orston	Nottinghamshire	102
4	Chapelton	Devon	148
5	Shippea Hill	Cambridgeshire	154

=== Period between 2024 and 2025 ===
Elton and Orston railway station was announced as being the least used station for the second time having previously been least used in the 2021/22 period. The statistics for this year showed the top five least used stations to be:

2024/2025 Period
Position	Station name	Station location	Usage figure
1	Elton and Orston	Nottinghamshire	68
2	Shippea Hill	Cambridgeshire	76
3	Ince & Elton	Cheshire	98
4	Denton	Greater Manchester	100
5	Reddish South	Greater Manchester	102

=== Period between 2023 and 2024 ===
Denton was announced as being the least used station that was open throughout the year for the second year in a row. The statistics for this year showed the top five least used stations were:

2023/2024 Period
Position	Station	Location	Usage figure
1	Denton	Greater Manchester	54
2	Shippea Hill	Cambridgeshire	70
3	Ince & Elton	Cheshire	86
4	Polesworth	Warwickshire	118
5	Reddish South	Greater Manchester	128

=== Period between 2022 and 2023 ===
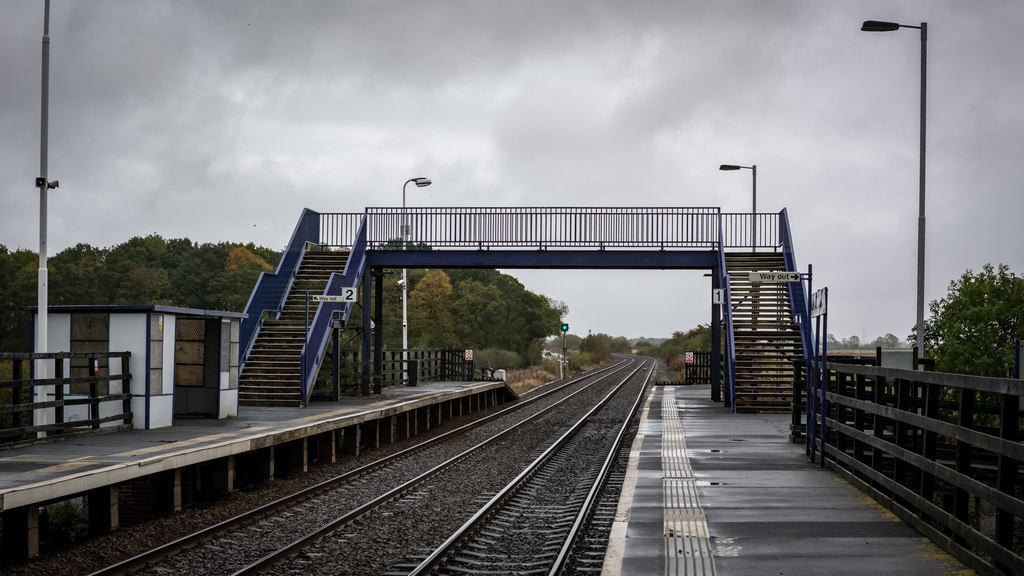
Teesside Airport Railway Station

The data between April 2022 and March 2023 was the first set of data with all stations having at least 1 passenger since the 2019/2020 period. The least used station in the whole country for this period was Teesside Airport, which had 2 passengers due to the platforms being closed over safety fears in May 2022. Ordinarily, the station would only have 1 train a week, on a Sunday. The statistics for this period showed the top five least used stations to be:

2022/2023 Period
Position	Station Name	Station Location	Usage Figure
1	Teesside Airport	County Durham	2
2	Denton	Greater Manchester	34
3	Elton & Orston	Nottinghamshire	56
4	Kirton Lindsey	Lincolnshire	94
5	Reddish South	Greater Manchester	100

=== Period between 2021 and 2022 ===
==== Zero stations ====
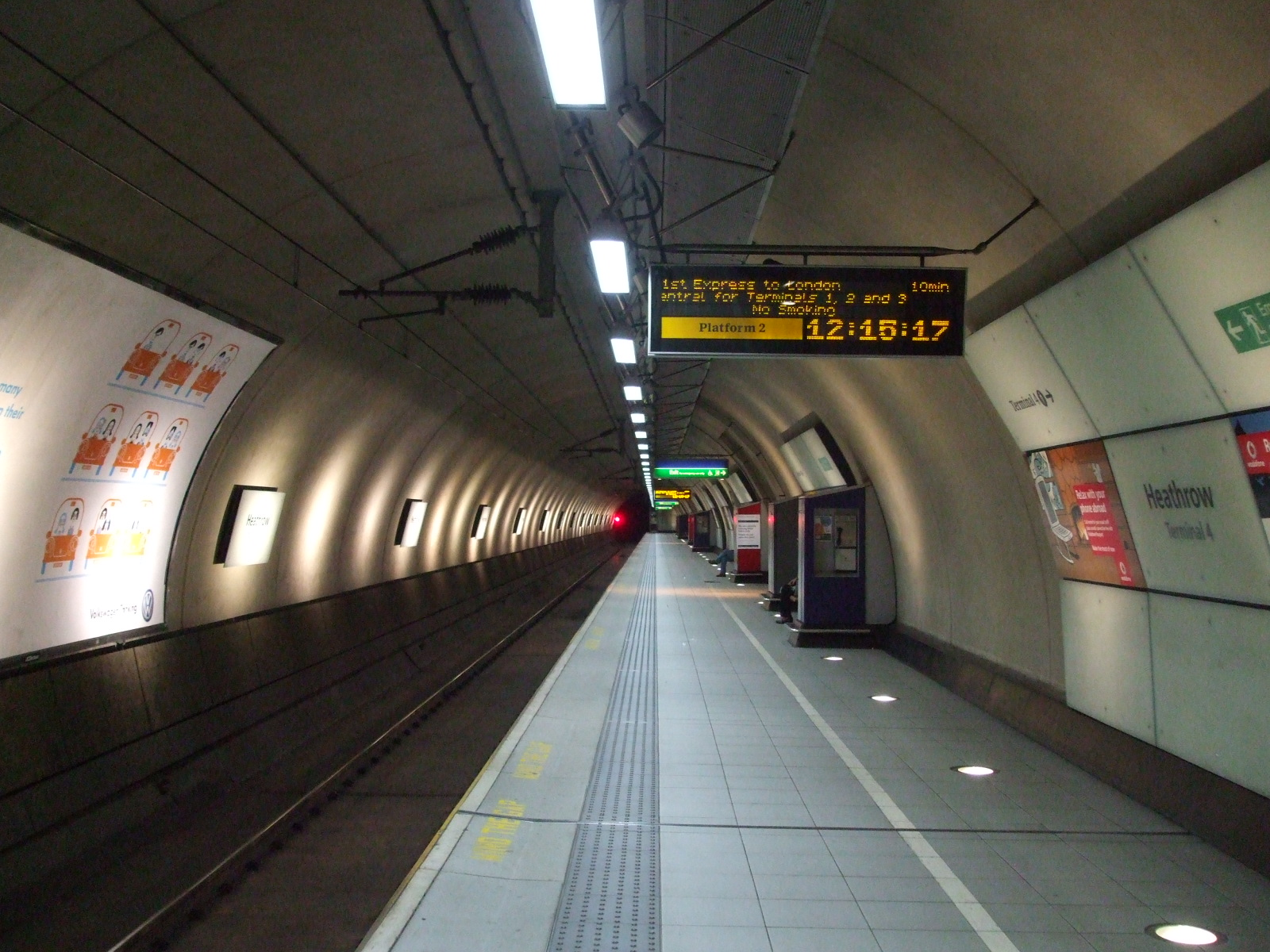
One of the National Rail platforms at Heathrow Terminal 4 in 2008, which was the only station with 0 passengers this year due to its closure.

The only station to receive zero passengers in this period was Heathrow Terminal 4, which was due to its closure between 9 May 2020 and 14 June 2022 as a result of the COVID-19 pandemic.

==== Stations above zero ====
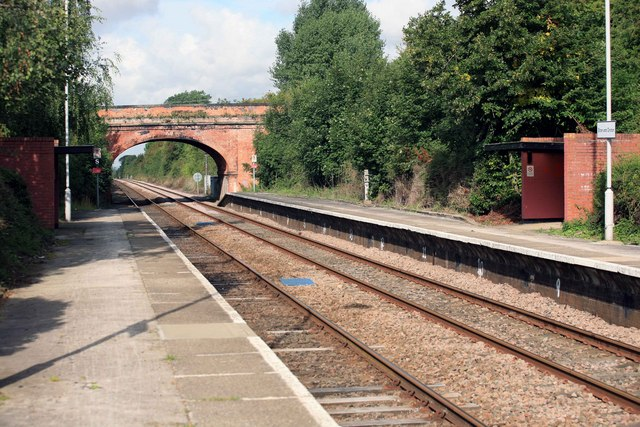
Elton & Orston, the 2021/22 least used station, seen in 2010.

The least used station in this statistic period was Elton & Orston, which is in that position for the first time. Kirton Lindsey maintained its position at number 5 for the second year running. Stanlow & Thornton had its services suspended in February 2022 (before the end of the year) due to safety concerns about the footbridge. Teesside Airport's services were suspended after the end of the year, and - whilst this did not affect these statistics - this was thought it might affect its passenger numbers for next year. Other than Heathrow, the statistics for this period showed the top five least used stations to be:

2021/22 Period
Position	Station Name	Station Location	Usage Figure
1	Elton & Orston	Nottinghamshire	40
2	Teesside Airport	County Durham	42
3	Stanlow & Thornton	Cheshire	44
4	Denton	Greater Manchester	50
5	Kirton Lindsey	Lincolnshire	68

=== Period between 2020 and 2021 ===
==== COVID-19 ====
The COVID-19 pandemic has had a great effect on the railway network in Great Britain. Usage fell approximately 78% in the period between April 2020 and March 2021. Some stations were even closed for long periods of time due to inability to social distance, caused by short platforms.

==== Zero stations ====
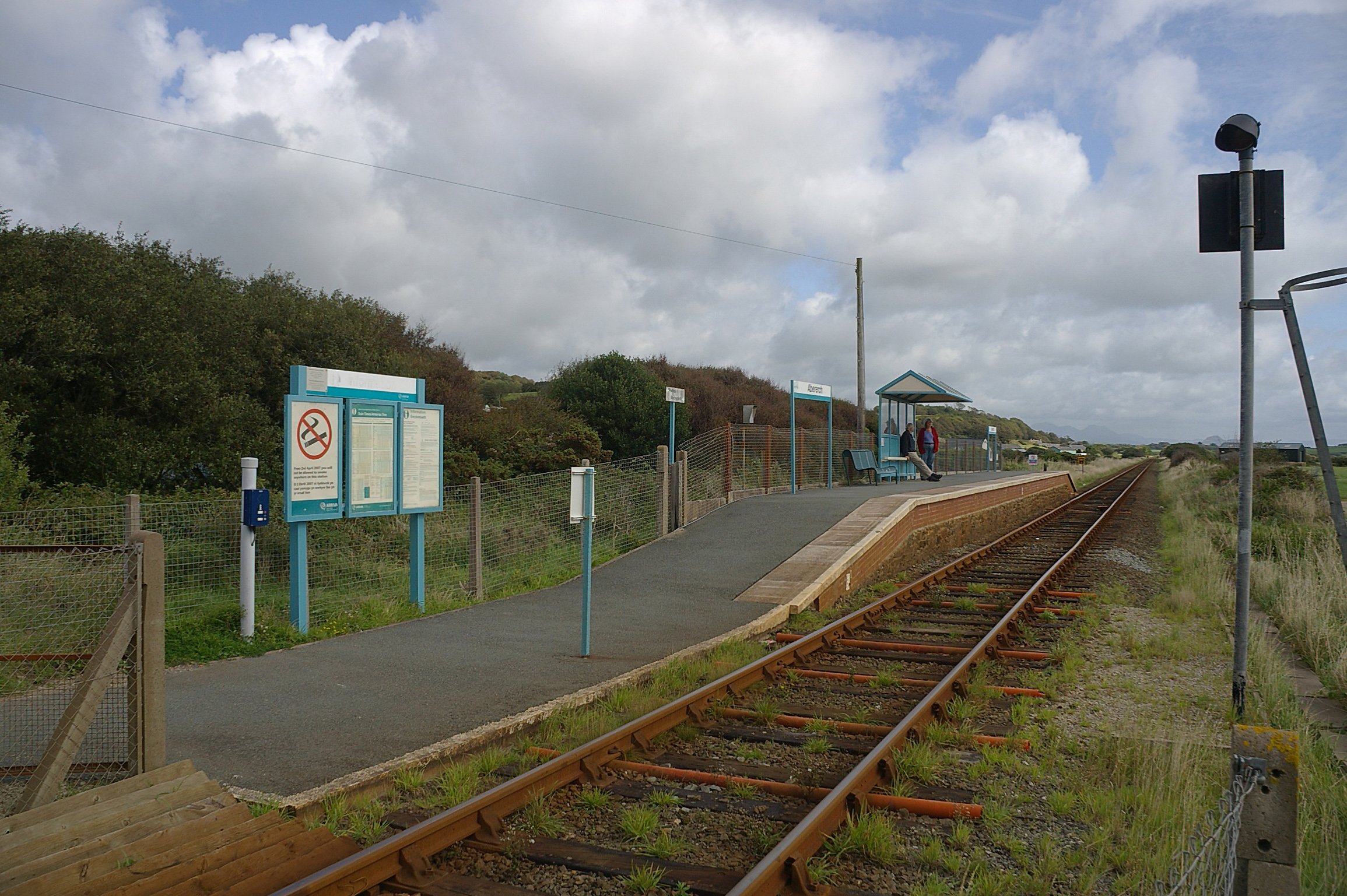
Abererch Station

There were six stations which were used by zero people in this period, those being: Abererch, Beasdale, Llanbedr, Sampford Courtenay, Stanlow and Thornton, and Sugar Loaf. Abererch, Llanbedr, and Sugar Loaf were some of a few stations closed during the pandemic due to social distancing measures. Sampford Courtenay was last served by Great Western Railway in summer 2019, and had all of its services withdrawn in December 2019 not long before the Dartmoor Heritage Railway went into administration, and no trains have served it since. Beasdale and Stanlow & Thornton had low passenger usage before the pandemic, so the restrictions impacted this even further. These stations will not be shown in the table for this period, but will be shown in the overview table.

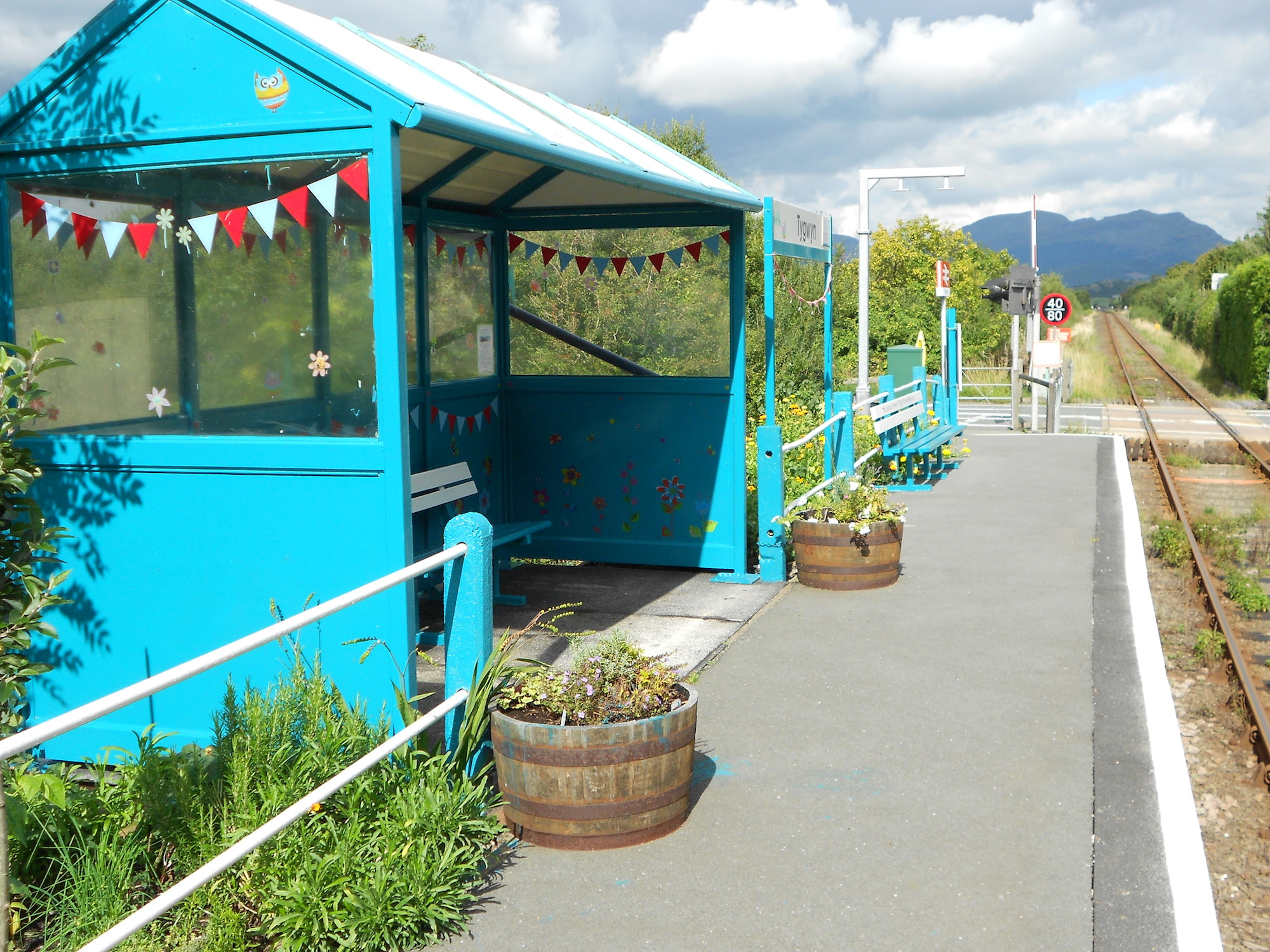
Tygwyn Station

==== Stations above zero ====
The least used station in this period (other than zero stations) was Teesside Airport, see period 2013 and 2014 for further information on this station. The second least used was Tygwyn in Gwynedd. Before the pandemic, this station got around 2000 passengers annually. However, it was closed during the pandemic due to social distancing measures, and when it was re-opened it never gained back its previous form. This is the same for most stations which fell dramatically in this period. Other than zero stations, the statistics for this period showed the top five least used stations to be:

2020/21 Period
Position	Station Name	Station Location	Usage Figure
1	Teesside Airport	County Durham	2
2	Tygwyn	Gwynedd	4
3	Okehampton	Devon	6
4	Llandanwg	Gwynedd	8
5	Kirton Lindsey	Lincolnshire	10

=== Period between 2019 and 2020 ===
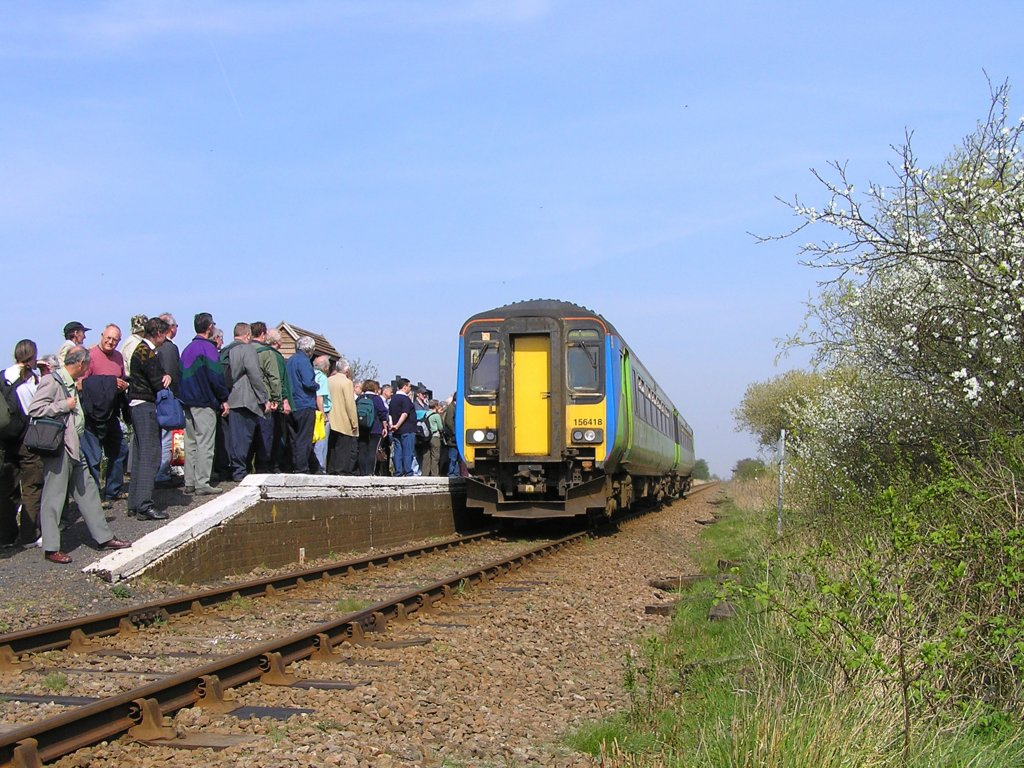
Berney Arms on a rather more busy day back in 2009

Due to the stats for this period finishing recording in March, this release was not completely affected by the COVID-19 pandemic. The least used station in the whole country for this period was Berney Arms, a small request stop on a lesser-used line between Norwich and Great Yarmouth. It dropped by approximately 90% from its statistics last year, due to it being closed for 15 months for signalling work. The statistics for this period showed the top five least used stations to be:

2019/2020 Period
Position	Station Name	Station Location	Usage Figure
1	Berney Arms	Norfolk	42
2	Elton & Orston	Nottinghamshire	68
3	Stanlow & Thornton	Cheshire	82
4	Havenhouse	Lincolnshire	84
5	Denton	Greater Manchester	92

=== Period between 2018 and 2019 ===
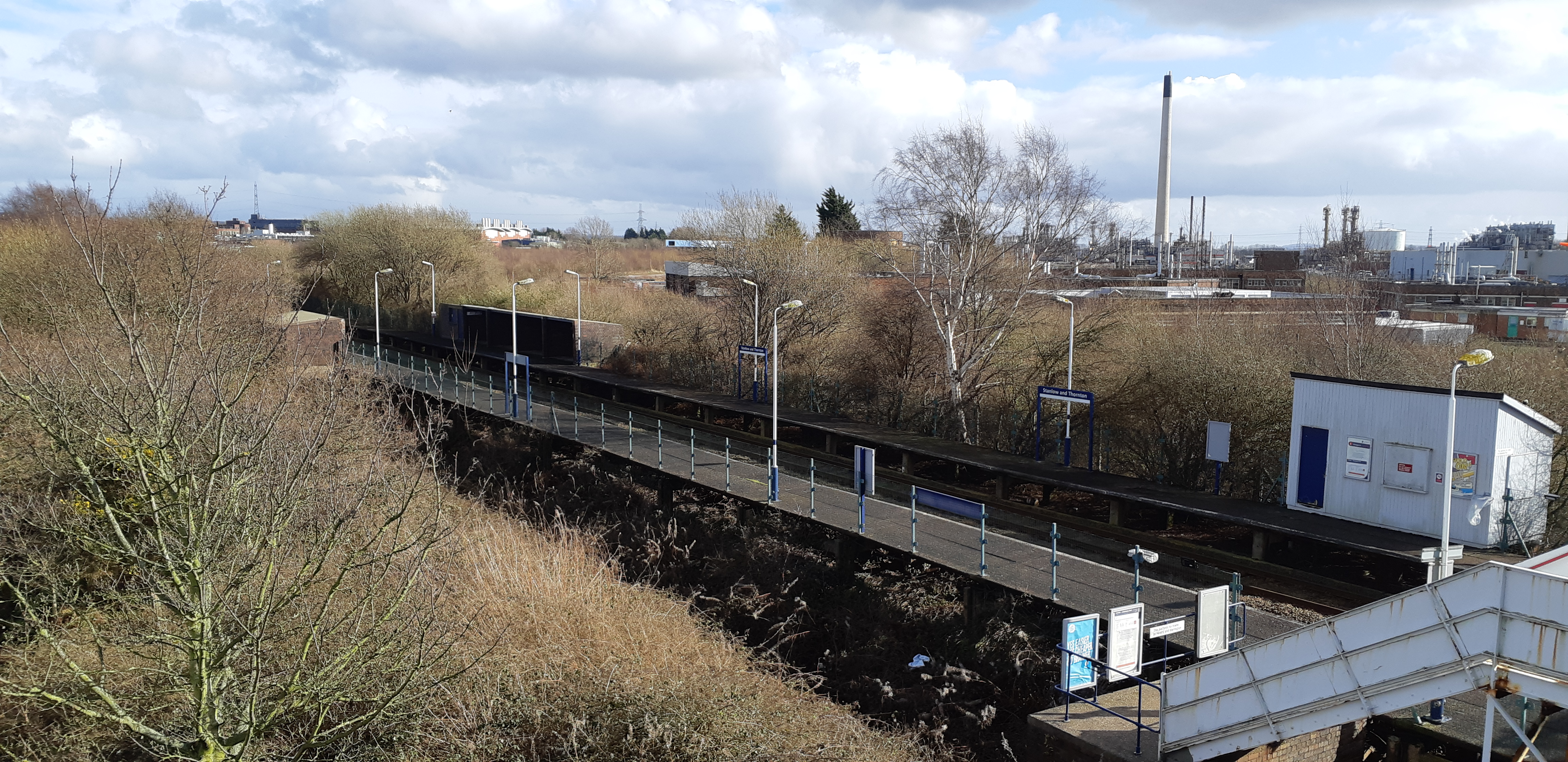
View of Stanlow and Thornton from the footbridge

The least used station in this period was a tie, the title being taken by both Stanlow and Thornton and Denton. Denton has always been very underused, being on a line that only gets one 2-way journey on a Saturday only. Stanlow and Thornton used to get an hourly service in the 1980s, but it has now been reduced to two trains in each direction a day. The statistics for this period showed the top five least used stations to be:

2018/2019 Period
Position	Station Name	Station Location	Usage Figure
1	Denton	Greater Manchester	46
1	Stanlow & Thornton	Cheshire	46
3	Reddish South	Greater Manchester	60
4	Barry Links	Angus	122
5	Havenhouse	Lincolnshire	158

=== Period between 2017 and 2018 ===
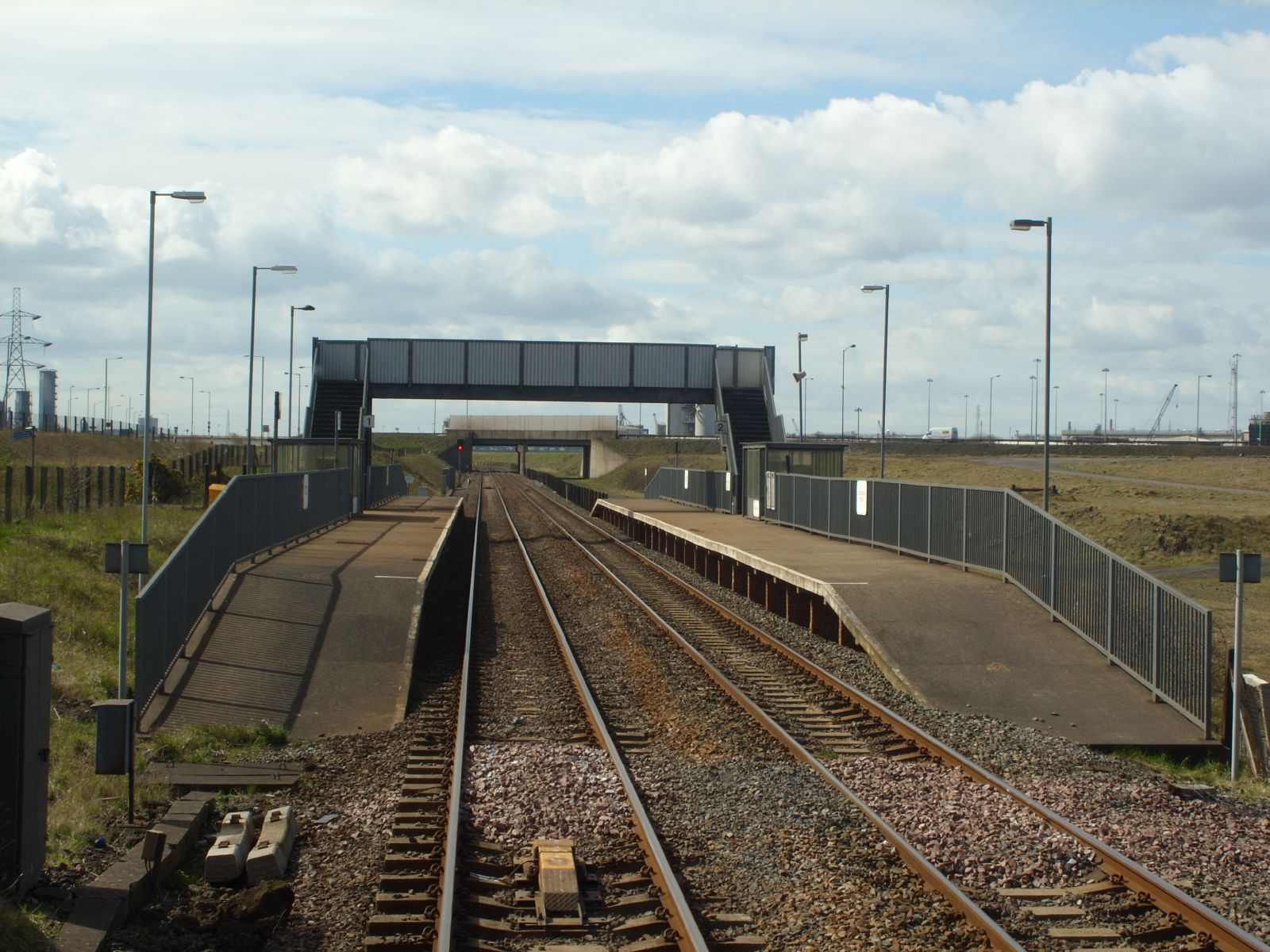
Redcar British Steel back in 2008

The least used station in this period was Redcar British Steel. It suffered a massive drop in passengers in this period, going from above 1000 passengers in 2014/15 dropping to just 40 in this period. This is due to the steel works which this station served being closed, and the station having no access other than from the train. The station itself had all of its services suspended in December 2019. The statistics for this period showed the top five least used stations to be:

2017/2018 Period
Position	Station Name	Station Location	Usage Figure
1	Redcar British Steel	Teesside	40
2	Barry Links	Angus	52
3	Denton	Greater Manchester	70
4	Teesside Airport	Teesside	74
5	Stanlow & Thornton	Cheshire	92

=== Period between 2016 and 2017 ===
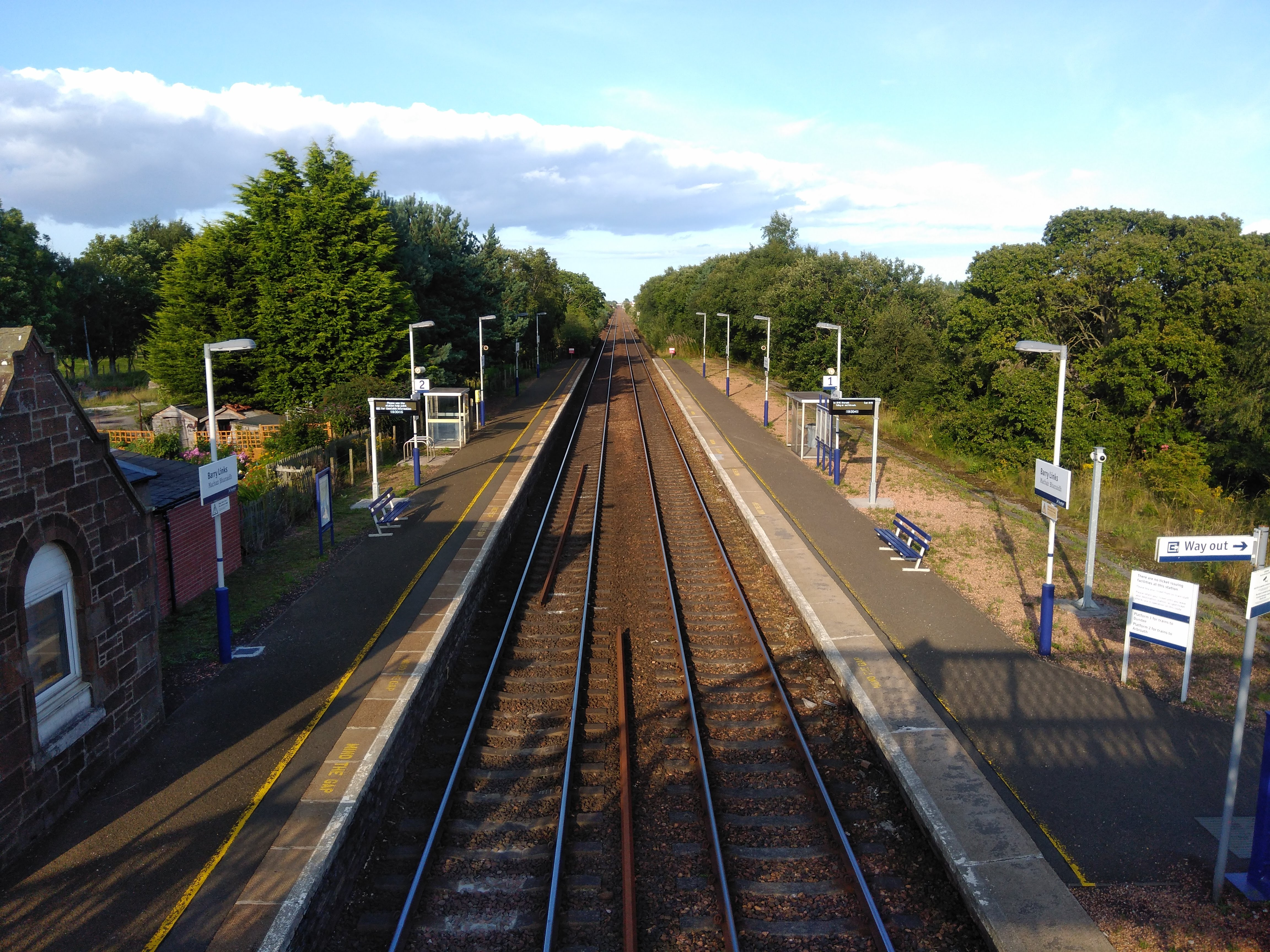
A picture of Barry Links back in August 2019

The least used station in this period was Barry Links. Originally opened by the Dundee and Arbroath Railway, Barry Links is located on the Dundee–Aberdeen line just east of the town of Barry. It's always been fairly unused due to a very sparse train service (one train a day in each direction). The statistics for this period showed the top five least used stations to be:

2016/2017 Period
Position	Station Name	Station Location	Usage Figure
1	Barry Links	Angus	24
2	Teesside Airport	Teesside	30
3	Breich	West Lothian	48
4	Redcar British Steel	Teesside	50
5	Kildonan	Highland	76

=== Period between 2015 and 2016 ===
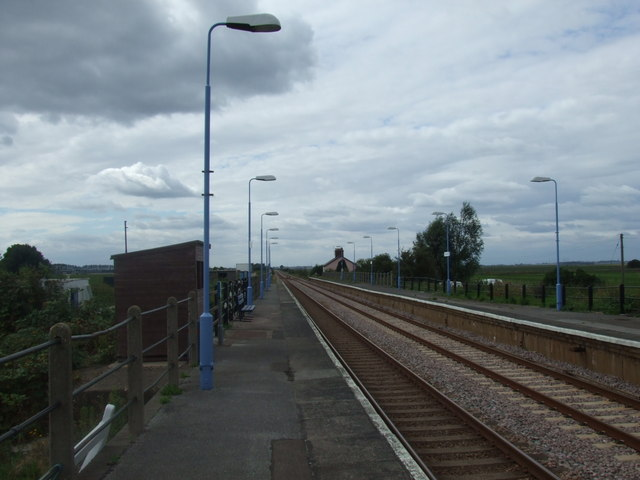
The west-bound platform of Shippea Hill, the level crossing and now defunct signal box behind

The least used station in this period was Shippea Hill. Originally opened as 'Mildenhall Road' in 1845, it has since been through two name changes; one in 1885 which saw it named as 'Burnt Fen', and again in 1904 where it was renamed to its current name, Shippea Hill. It's located on the Breckland line, approximately six miles west of Ely. Its location is the reason of it being so least used. The statistics for this period show the top five least used stations to be:

2015/2016 Period
Position	Station Name	Station Location	Usage Figure
1	Shippea Hill	Cambridgeshire	12
2	Reddish South	Greater Manchester	38
3	Pilning	Gloucestershire	46
4	Coombe Junction Halt	Cornwall	48
5	Barry Links	Angus	68

=== Period between 2014 and 2015 ===
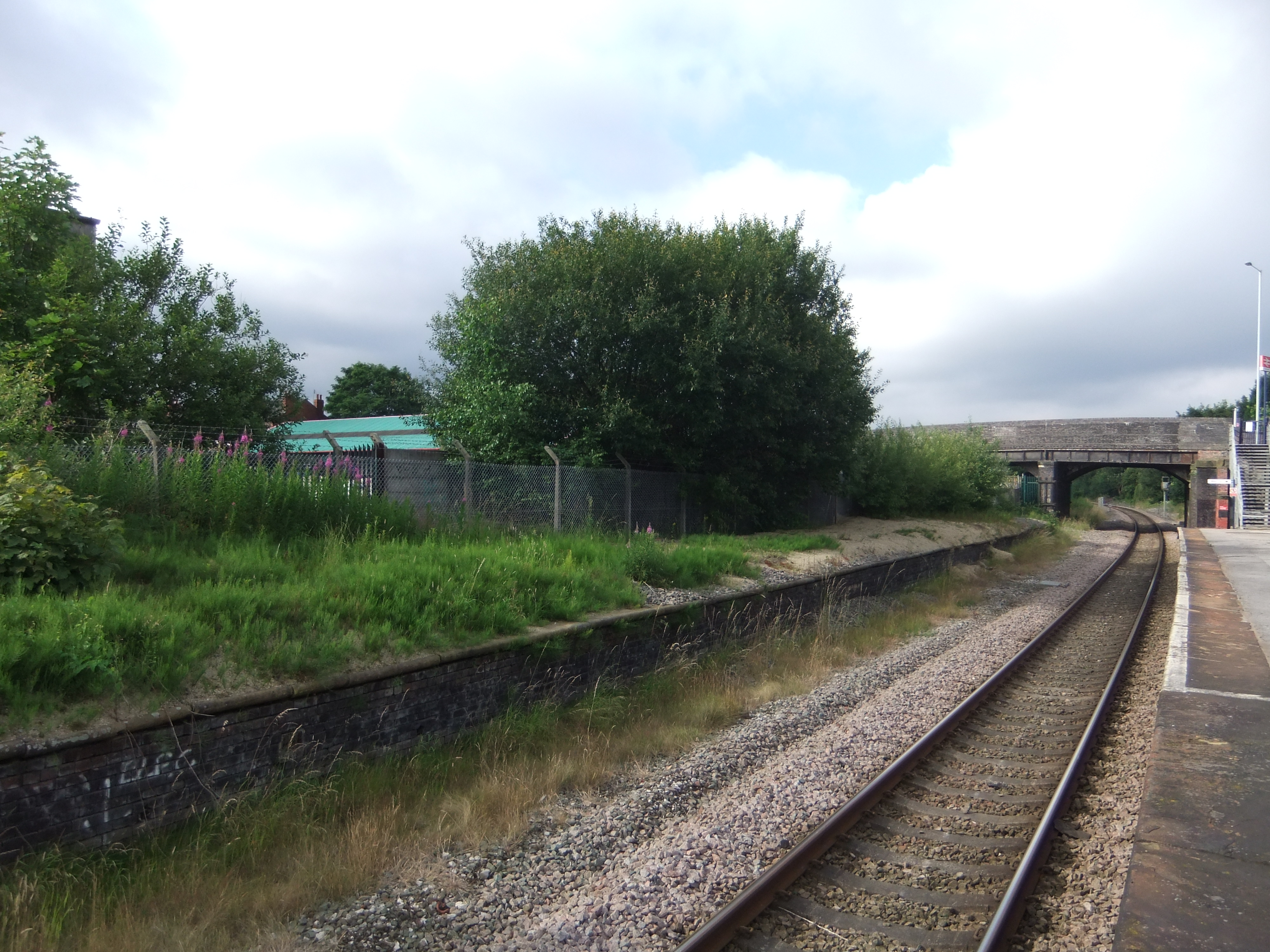
Reddish South station, which came 4th in the rankings for this period

The least used station in this period was Shippea Hill (It had this honour three times in a row). See above for background information on this station. The second least used was Coombe Junction Halt, a station which always seems to find itself in the top five or ten. This is due to its location (on a small industrial estate near Liskeard) and its sparse service. The statistics for this period show the top five least used stations to be:

2014/2015 Period
Position	Station Name	Station Location	Usage Figure
1	Shippea Hill	Cambridgeshire	22
2	Coombe Junction Halt	Cornwall	26
3	Teesside Airport	Teesside	32
4	Reddish South	Greater Manchester	54
5	Barry Links	Angus	60

=== Period between 2013 and 2014 ===
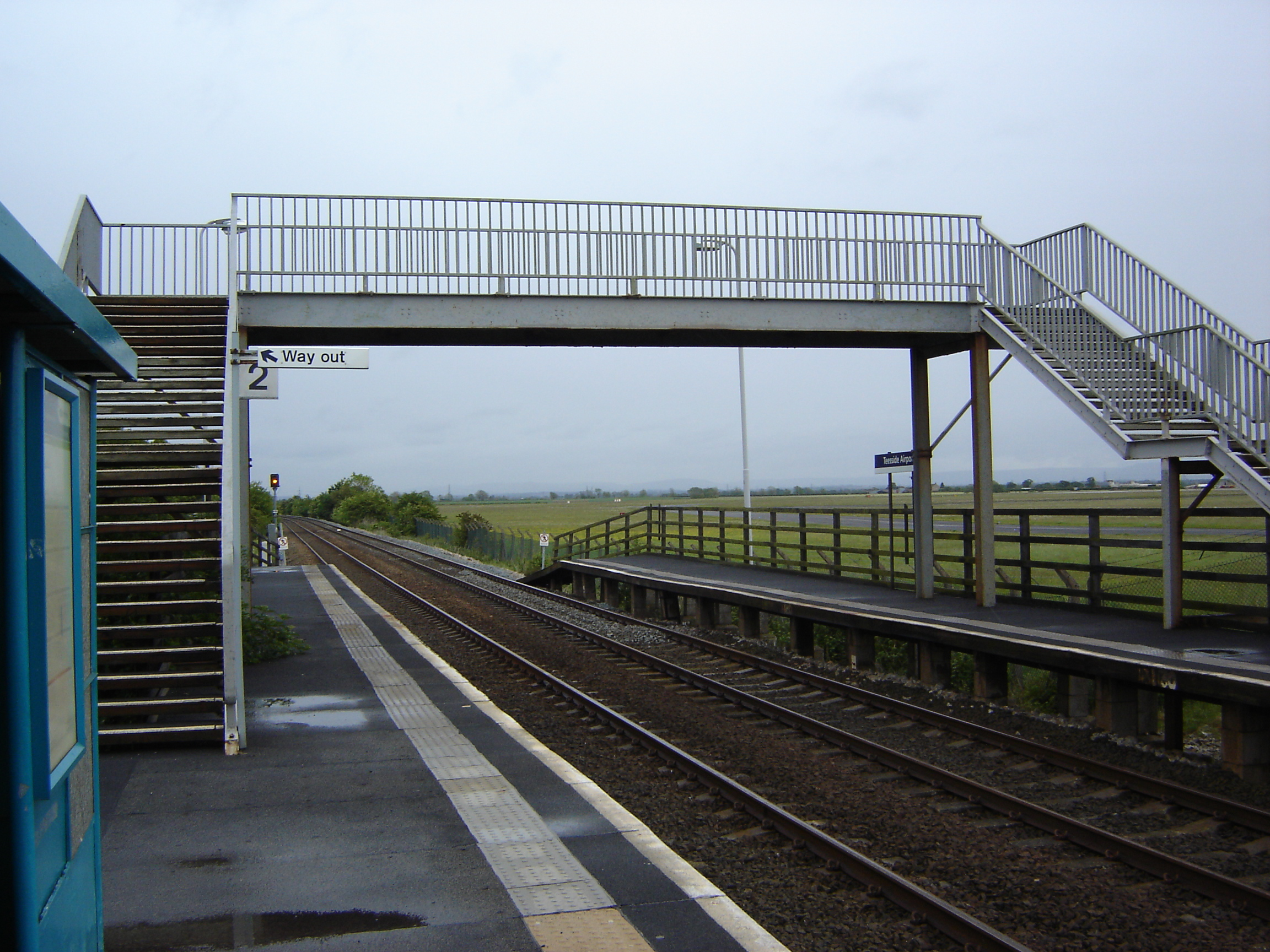
The footbridge at Teesside Airport, as seen from platform 2

In this period, the least used station was Teesside Airport for the fourth time in a row. It is a very sparsely served station on the Tees Valley line. It only receives one train a week as of the December 2020 timetable coming into effect. It has two platforms but only one is used due to there being only one service a week. It serves Teesside International Airport, which by airport-standards is also fairly under-used. The statistics for this period showed the top five least used stations to be:

2013/2014 Period
Position	Station Name	Station Location	Usage Figure
1	Teesside Airport	Teesside	8
2	Shippea Hill	Cambridgeshire	12
3	Reddish South	Greater Manchester	26
4	Barry Links	Angus	40
5	Coombe Junction Halt	Cornwall	42

=== Period between 2012 and 2013 ===
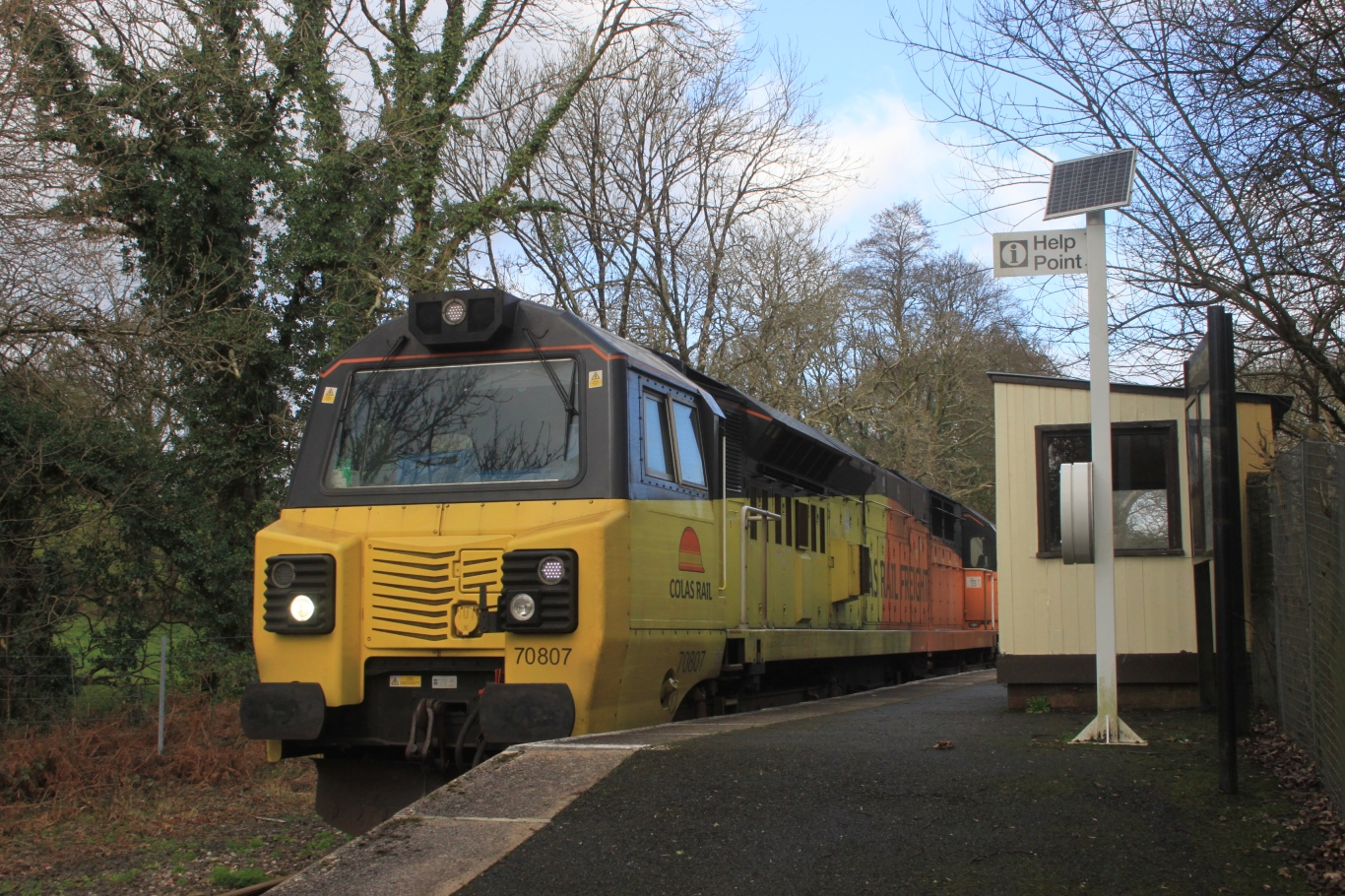
A Colas Class 70 on the Moorswater to Aberthaw return freight service.

In this period, the least used station was Teesside Airport for the third time in a row. See above for background information on the station. The second least used was Coombe Junction Halt, a small halt on the Looe Valley Line. It only gets four trains a day (two in each direction) as most trains reverse at the level crossing around 50 ft down the track. See Looe Valley Line for more information. The statistics for this period showed the top five least used stations to be:

2012/2013 Period
Position	Station Name	Station Location	Usage Figure
1	Teesside Airport	Teesside	8
2	Coombe Junction Halt	Cornwall	48
3	Shippea Hill	Cambridgeshire	50
4	Barry Links	Angus	52
5	Kildonan	Highland	62

=== Period between 2011 and 2012 ===
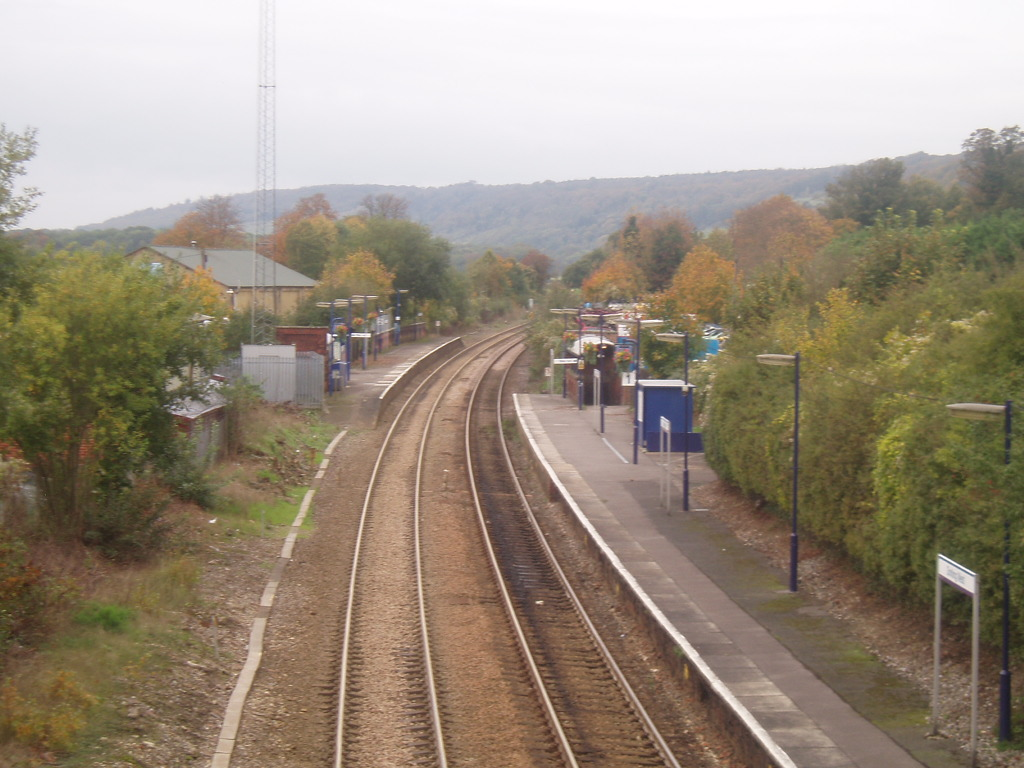
Dorking West back in 2006

In this period, the least used station was Teesside Airport for the second time in a row. See above for background information on the station. The second least used station was Dorking West. The only reason it gets this title is due to a supposed anomalous result caused by a 'computer predicting system'. This station would usually see around 50,000 passengers each year.

2011/2012 Period
Position	Station Name	Station Location	Usage Figure
1	Teesside Airport	Teesside	14
2	Dorking West	Surrey	16
3	Denton	Greater Manchester	30
4	Reddish South	Greater Manchester	56
5	Coombe Junction Halt	Cornwall	60

=== Period between 2010 and 2011 ===
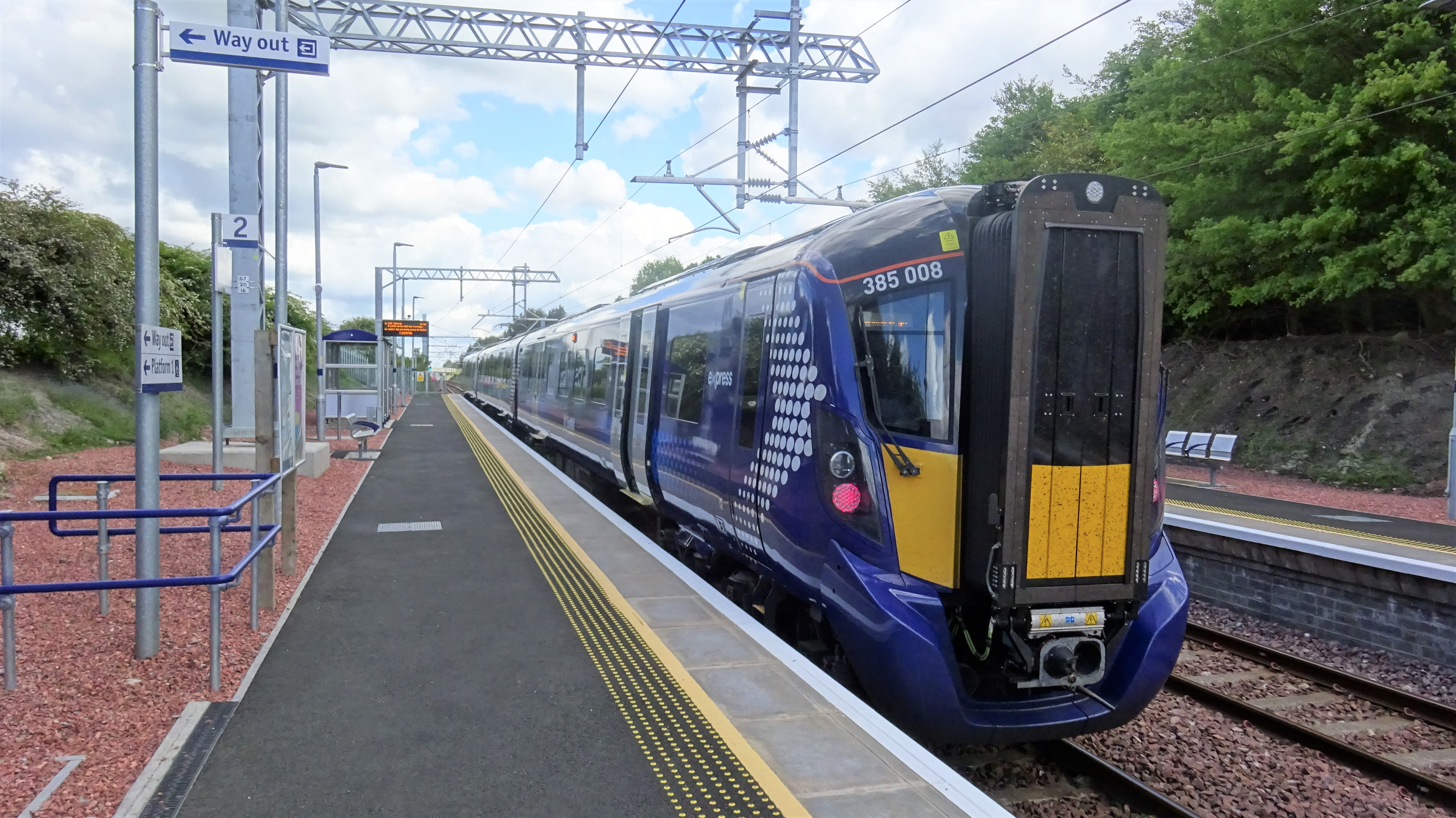
Breich Station (placed 5th) with a Class 385 in the platform

The least used station in this period was Teesside Airport. See above for background information on this station. The second least used station was Dorking West. This station got second place twice in a row (see above) due to a supposed anomalous results caused by a 'computer predicting system'. See above for background information on this station. The statistics for this period showed the top five least used stations to be:

2010/2011 Period
Position	Station Name	Station Location	Usage Figure
1	Teesside Airport	Teesside	18
2	Dorking West	Surrey	22
3	Coombe Junction Halt	Cornwall	38
4	Denton	Greater Manchester	52
5	Breich	West Lothian	68

=== Period between 2009 and 2010 ===
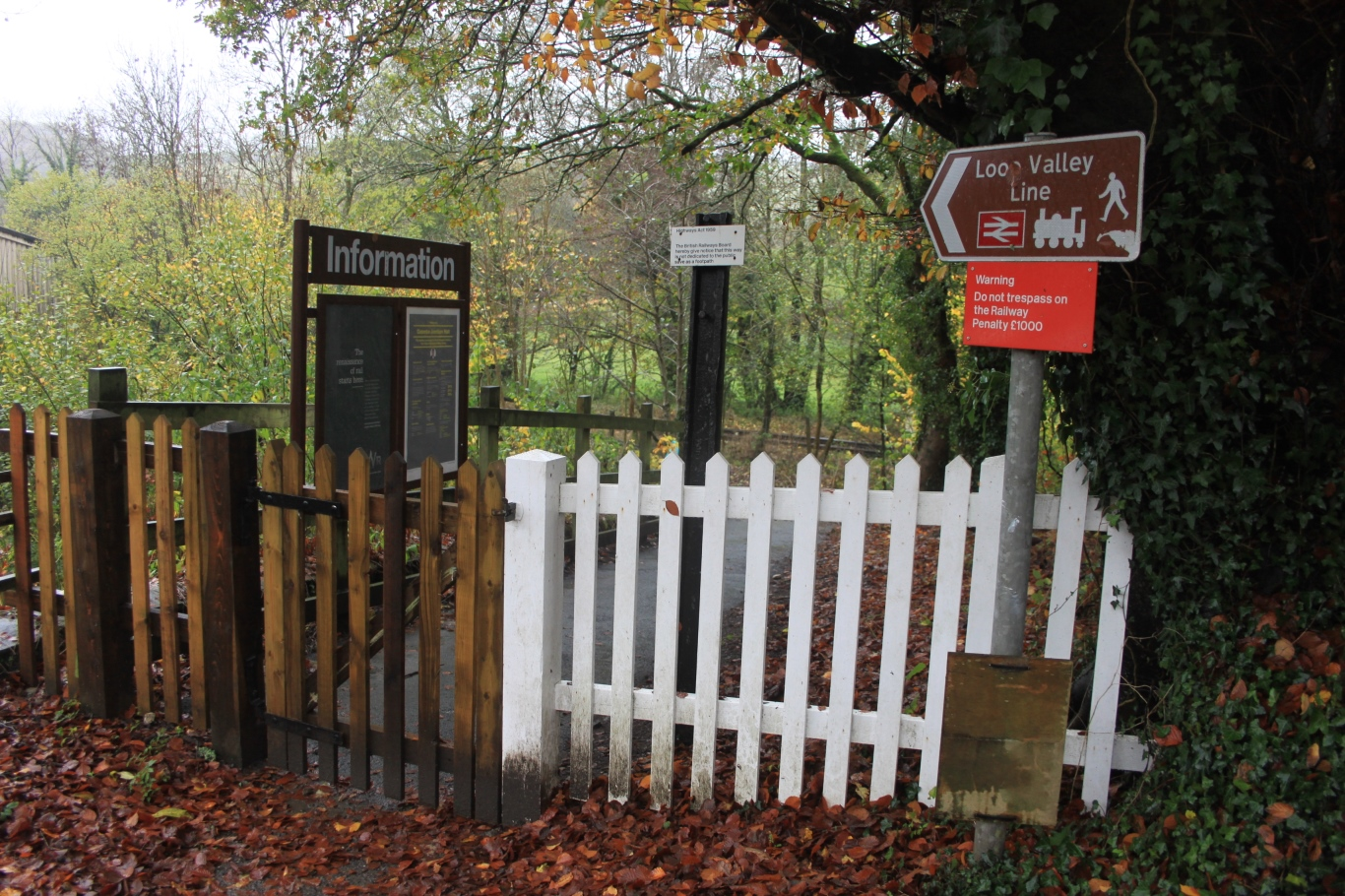
The northern entrance to Coombe Junction, at one side of the road bridge just past the station

The least used station in this period was Coombe Junction Halt, a small halt on the Looe Valley Line. Owing to its sparse service of four trains a day, and its location on an industrial estate near Liskeard, this station is always very under used. More background information on this station is available in the section for the period between 2012 and 2013. The statistics for this period showed the top five least used stations to be:

2009/2010 Period
Position	Station Name	Station Location	Usage Figure
1	Coombe Junction Halt	Cornwall	42
2	Teesside Airport	Teesside	68
3	Reddish South	Greater Manchester	76
4	Barry Links	Angus	90
5	Sugar Loaf	Powys	106

=== Period between 2008 and 2009 ===
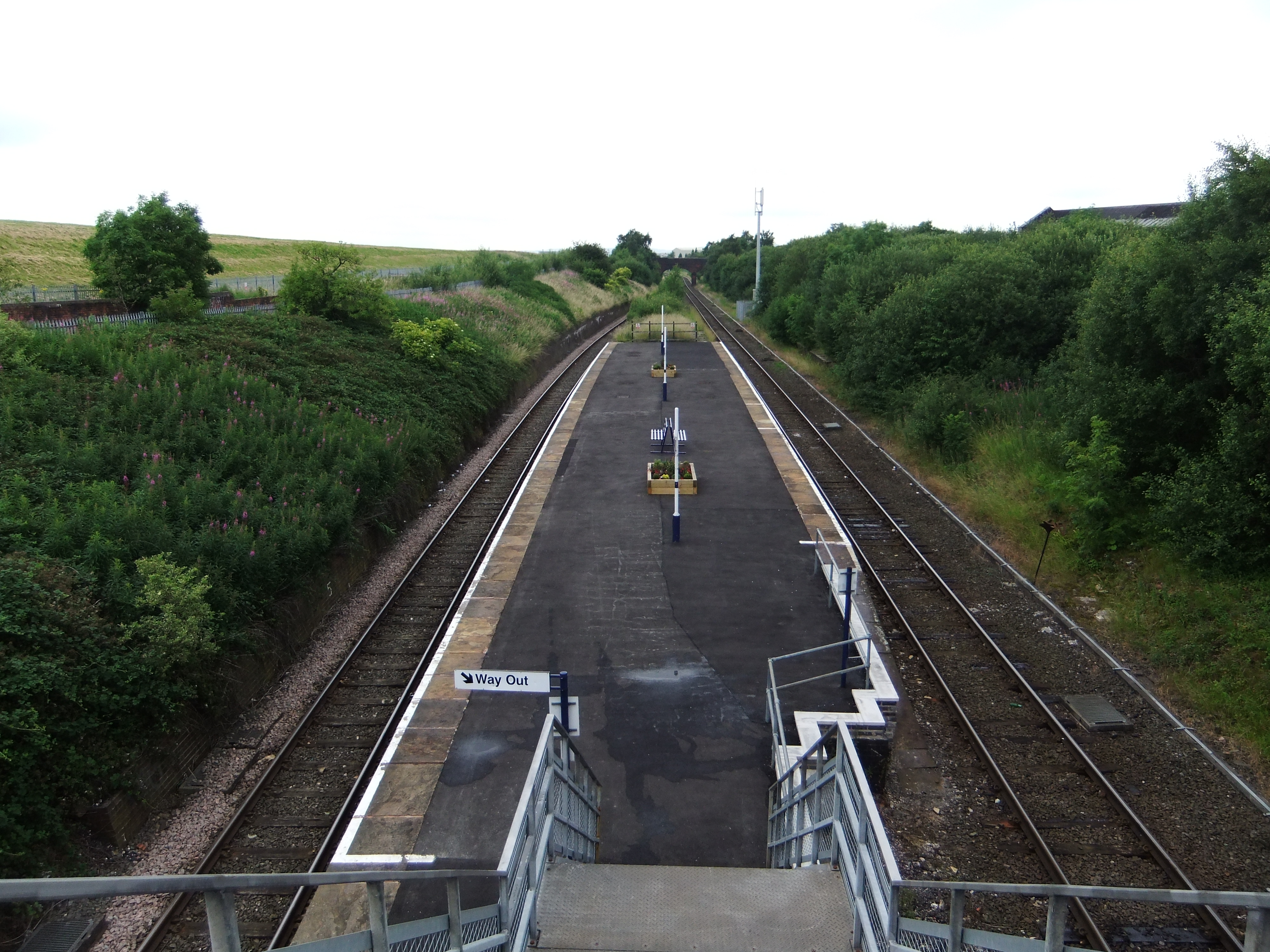
A view of the single bay-platform at Denton from the stairs

The least used station in this period was Teesside Airport. Background information for this station is available in the section for the 2013 and 2014 period. The second least used station in this period was Denton. Located on the Stockport–Stalybridge line, it only receives two services (one to Stalybridge and one to Stockport) on a Saturday. Owing to this, this station is always hovering around the top five, but very rarely actually going top. The statistics for this period showed the top five least used stations to be:

2008/2009 Period
Position	Station Name	Station Location	Usage Figure
1	Teesside Airport	Teesside	44
2	Denton	Greater Manchester	56
3	Maidstone Barracks	Maidstone	70
4	Kirton Lindsey	Lincolnshire	88
5	Barry Links	Angus	94

=== Period between 2007 and 2008 ===
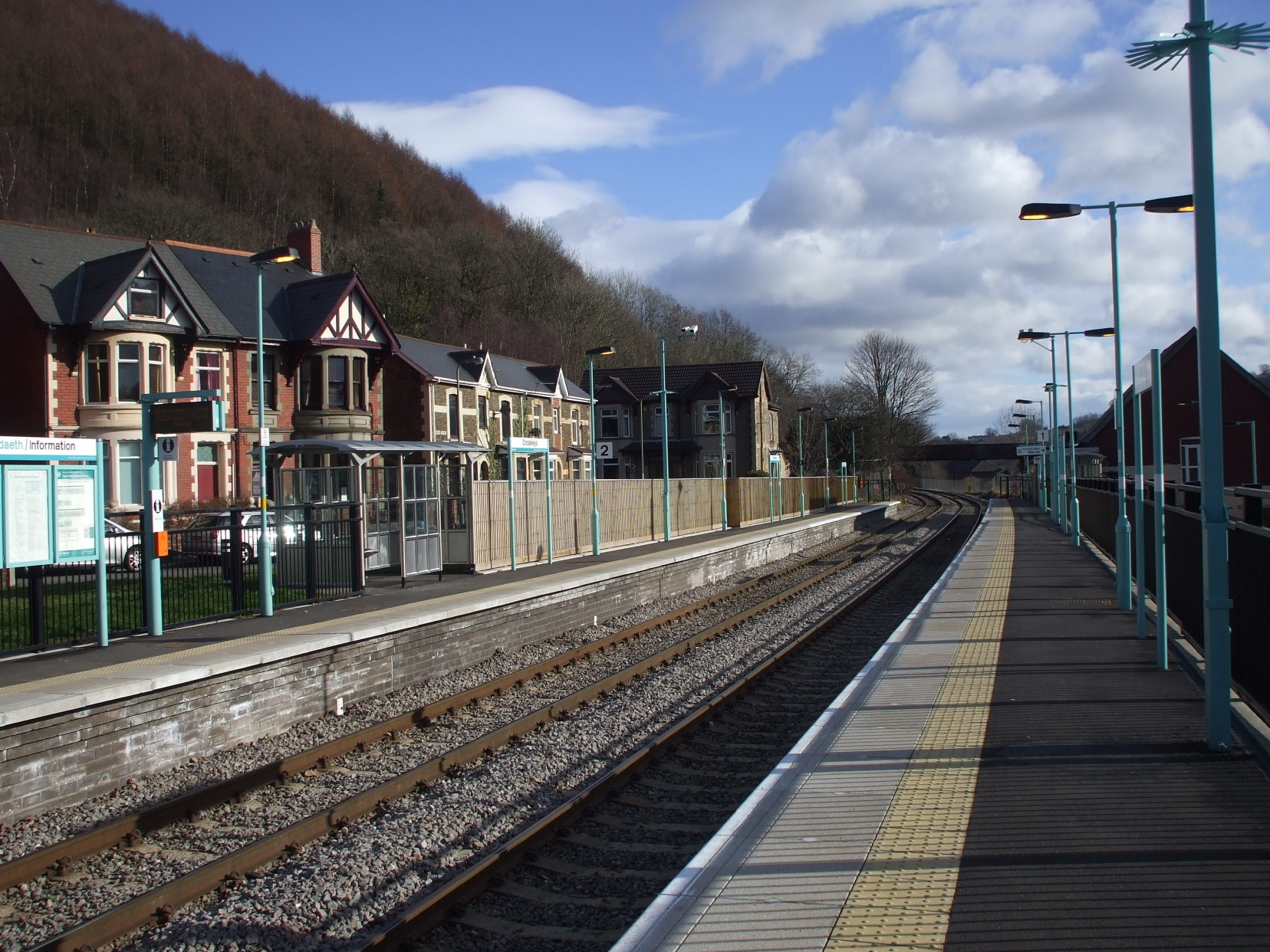
Crosskeys back in 2009

The least used station in this period was Crosskeys. The only reason it earnt this title was due to the station only being reopened during this period, and there was not enough time for the station to get a proper usage. It is located on the Ebbw Valley Railway in Wales and is served with one train an hour in each direction on Monday to Saturday, and approximately one train every two hours on a Sunday. Similarly, the second-placed Llanhilleth railway station reopened during this period and usage figures rose significantly in subsequent years. The statistics for this period showed the top five least used stations to be:

2007/2008 Period
Position	Station Name	Station Location	Usage Figure
1	Crosskeys	Caerphilly	8
2	Llanhilleth	Blaenau Gwent	10
3	Reddish South	Greater Manchester	47
4	Dorking West	Surrey	52
5	Teesside Airport	Teesside	52

=== Period between 2006 and 2007 ===
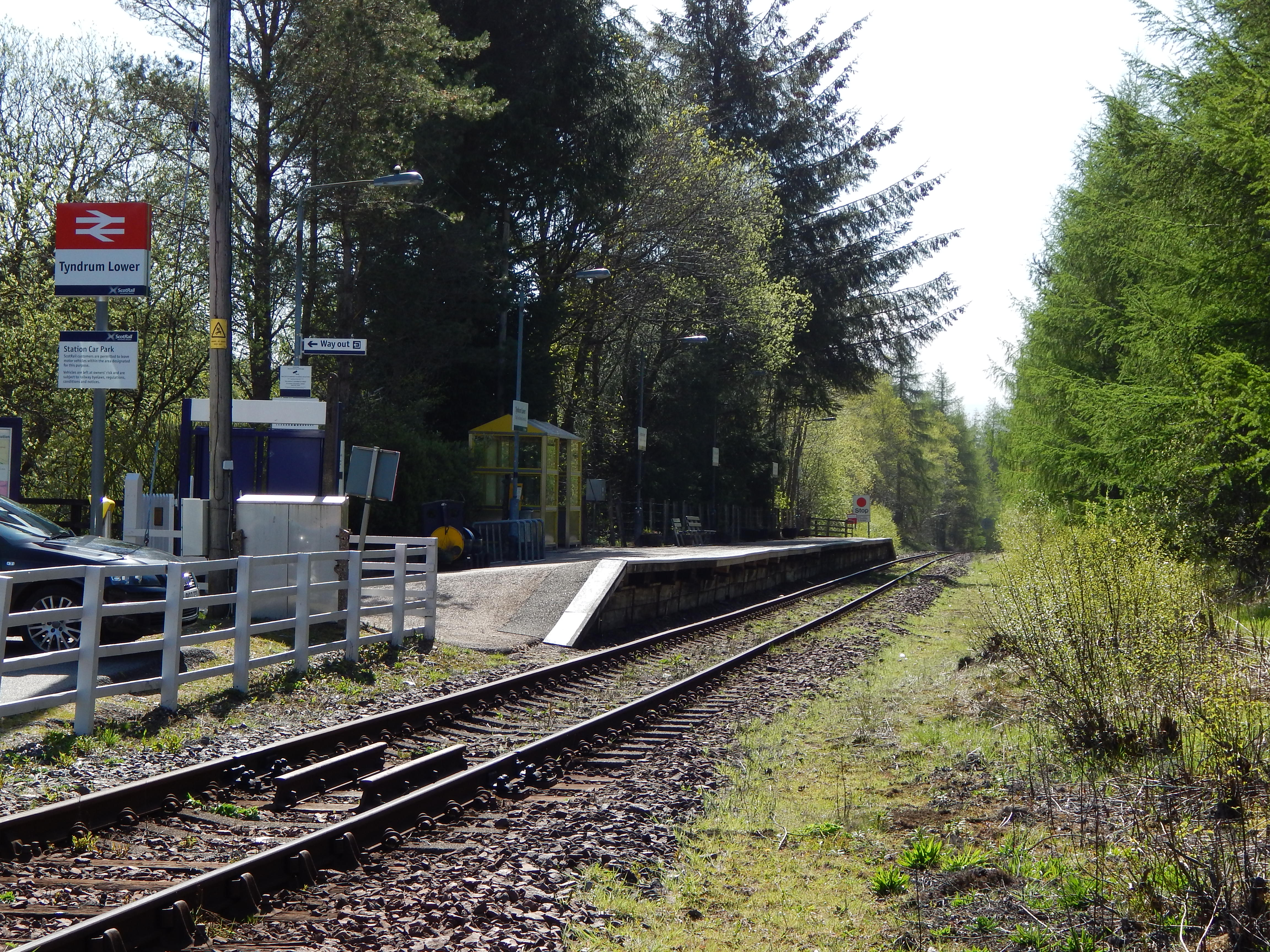
An image showing the single platform of Tyndrum Lower

The least used station in this period was Tyndrum Lower. One of two stations in the small village of Tyndrum, this one is located on the West Highland Line. With only six trains calling at this station on Monday-Saturday, and the local village only having a population of 167, this station is always rather unused, now getting around 5,000 passengers modern-day. The statistics for this period showed the top five least used stations to be:

2006/2007 Period
Position	Station Name	Station Location	Usage Figure
1	Tyndrum Lower	Stirling	17
2	Buckenham	Norfolk	22
3	Coombe Junction Halt	Cornwall	32
4	Golf Street	Angus	38
5	Barry Links	Angus	44

=== Period between 2005 and 2006 ===
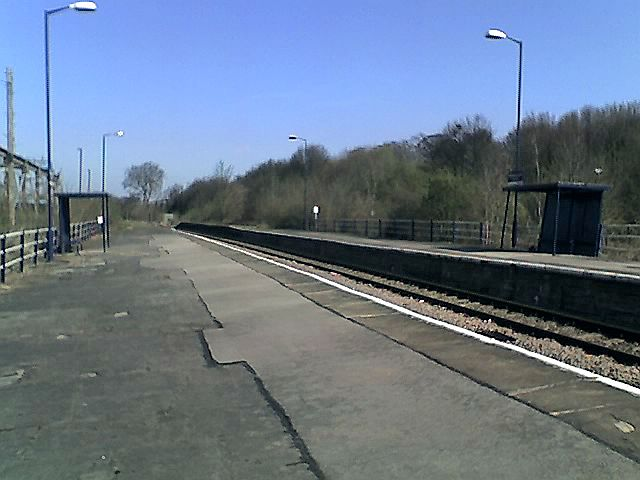
Gainsborough Central in 2007

The least used station in this period was Gainsborough Central. It had this honour twice in a row. The station earned this title due to its sparse Saturday-only service which were introduced in British Rail in 1993. Located on the Sheffield–Lincoln line it only three of these Saturday only trains. It has since gained a better service after a long campaign for better service on the line finally succeeded. The statistics for this period showed the top five least used stations to be:

2005/2006 Period
Position	Station Name	Station Location	Usage Figure
1	Gainsborough Central	Lincolnshire	21
2	Shippea Hill	Cambridgeshire	26
3	Barry Links	Angus	28
4	Buckenham	Norfolk	29
5	Dorking West	Surrey	40 (Note: May not be due to this, but this seems to be the only logical theory)

=== Period between 2004 and 2005 ===
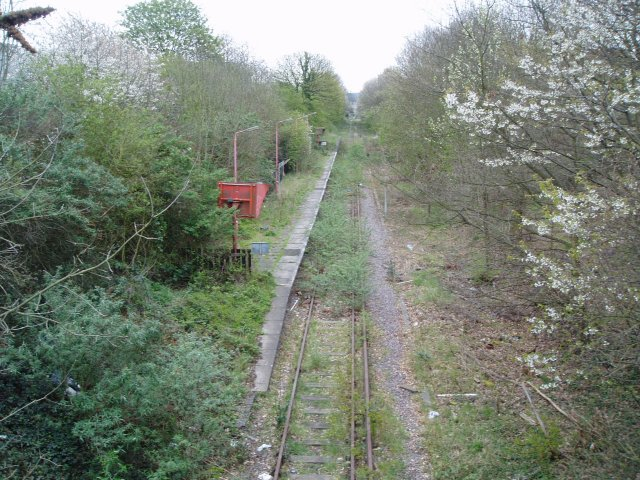
The overgrown platform and track of Watford West in 2005

The least used station in this period was Gainsborough Central. It had this honour twice in a row. See above for background information on this station. The second least used station in this period was Watford West. Despite the station being closed by this time, 25 people still purchased a ticket to this station, causing the statistics to count it. The station closed in 2002, the line itself being closed a year later. See Watford West for more information. The statistics for this period showed the top five least used stations to be:

2004/2005 Period
Position	Station Name	Station Location	Usage Figure
1	Gainsborough Central	Lincolnshire	21
2	Watford West	Hertfordshire	25
3	Barry Links	Angus	26
4	Dorking West	Surrey	29
5	Golf Street	Angus	30

=== Period between 2003 and 2004 ===
Statistics for this period were not produced due to a change in the methodology used.

=== Period between 2002 and 2003 ===
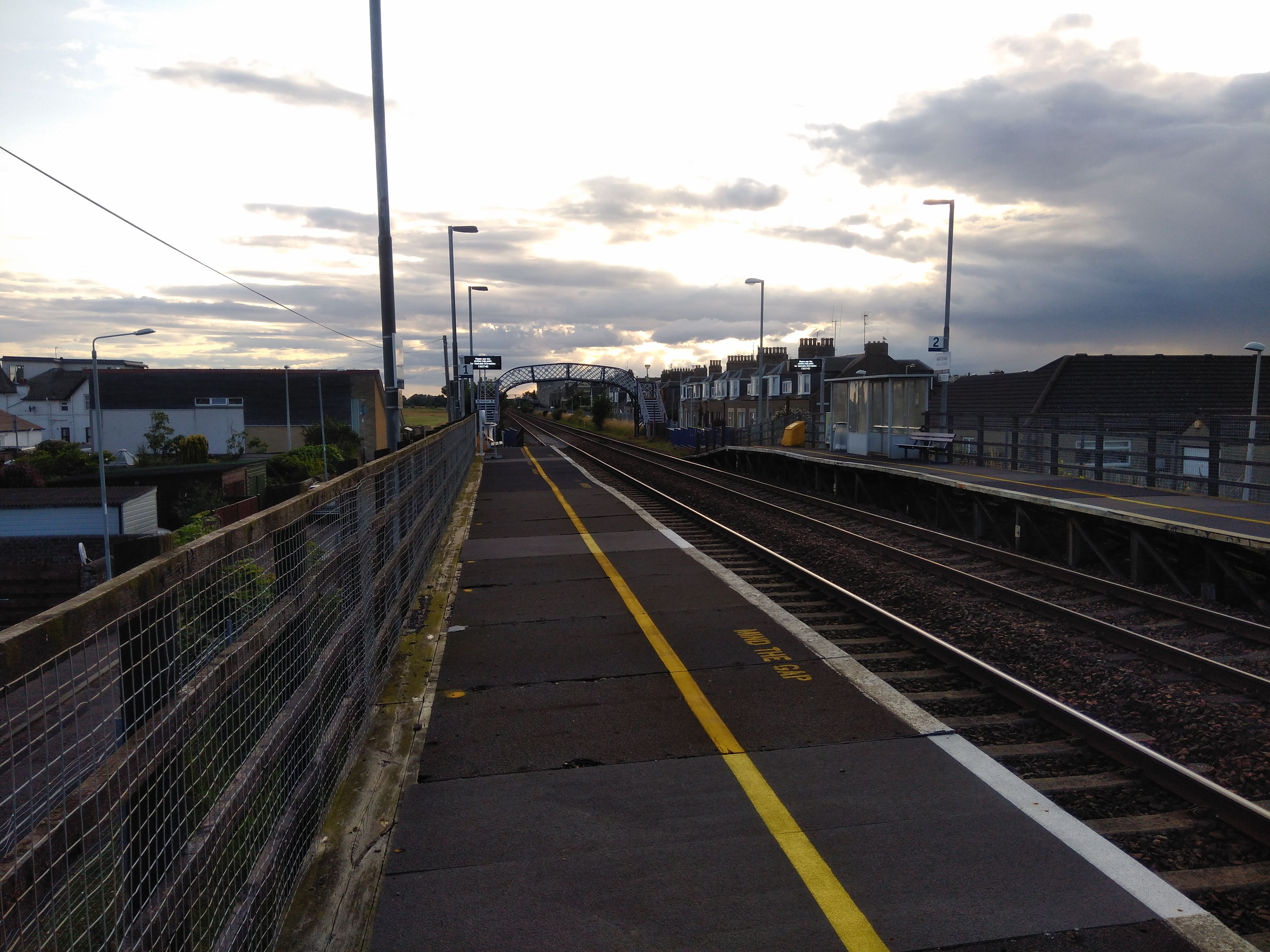
Golf Street in 2019

The least used station in this period was Barry Links and Gainsborough Central. For background information on these stations, see period 2004 and 2005 for Gainsborough Central and period 2016 and 2017 for Barry Links. The third least used station for this period was Golf Street. Located on the Dundee–Aberdeen line, the station only gets three trains a day, and to this day it remains in the top five least used stations in Scotland. The statistics for this period showed the top five least used stations to be: (Note: The spreadsheet provided for this period does not provided the added together entries and exits, so this has been done manually.)

2002/2003 Period
Position	Station Name	Station Location	Usage Figure
1	Barry Links	Angus	8
2	Gainsborough Central	Lincolnshire	8
3	Golf Street	Angus	18
4	Watford West	Hertfordshire	26
5	Shippea Hill	Cambridgeshire	29

=== Period between 2001 and 2002 ===
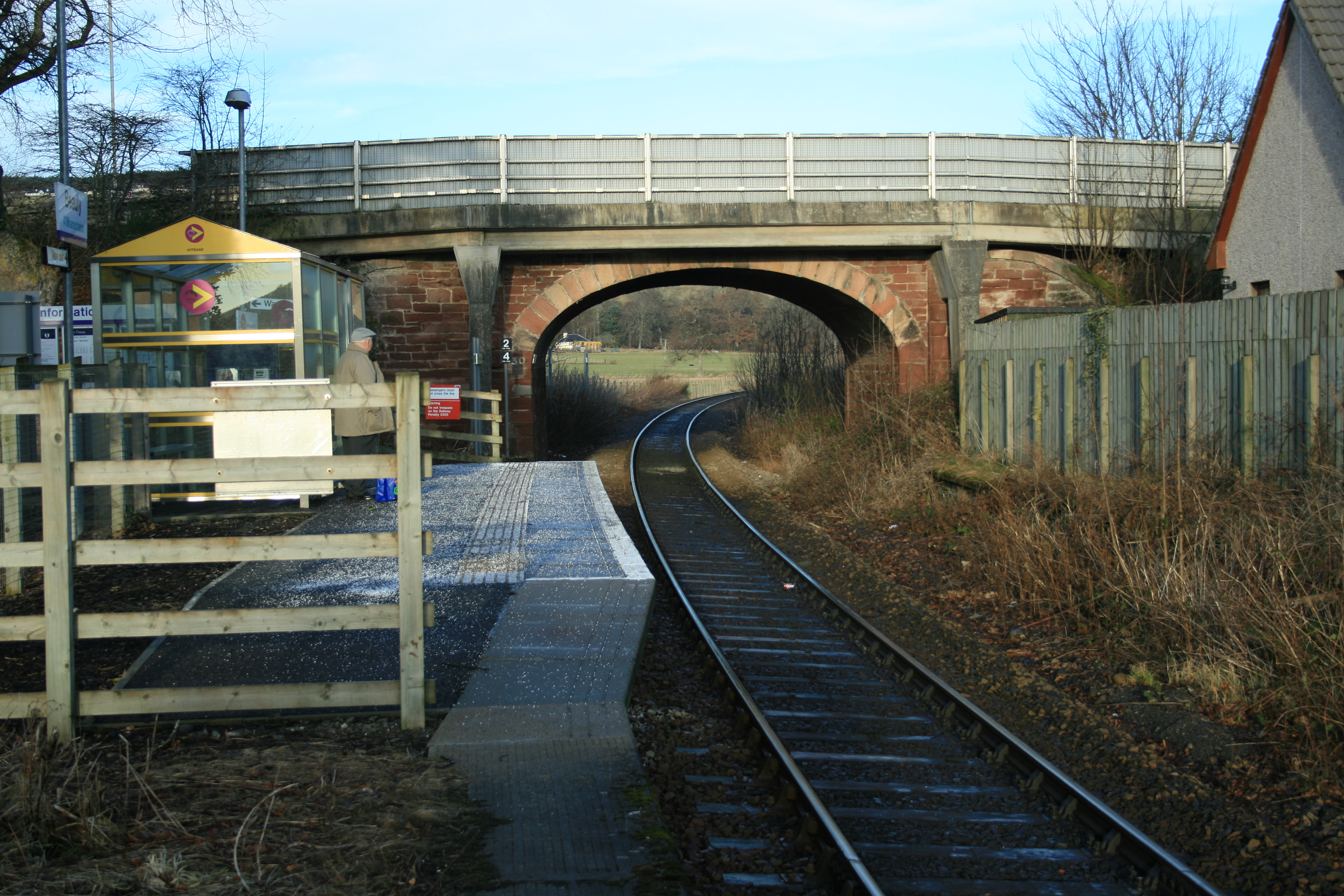
A picture showing the extremely short platform of Beauly

The least used station in this period was Beauly. It only gained this title as the station was opened during this period, so it did not have enough time to gain a significant number of passengers. It's located on the Far North Line between Inverness and Muir of Ord. The statistics for this period showed the top five least used stations to be:

2001/2002 Period
Position	Station Name	Station Location	Usage Figure
1	Beauly	Highland	23
2	Barry Links	Angus	24
3	Gainsborough Central	Lincolnshire	24
4	Pontefract Baghill	West Yorkshire	40
5	Buckenham	Norfolk	41

=== Period between 2000 and 2001 ===
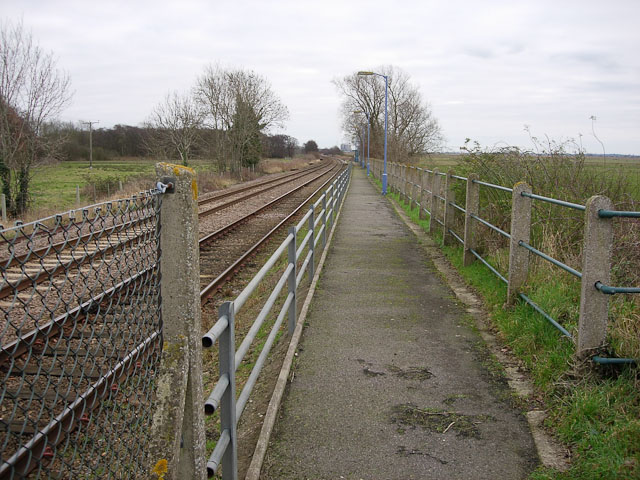
The path leading to the distant platform 2 of Buckenham

The least used station in this period was Buckenham. This station is rather unique in the way that it only receives services on weekend. This is not unheard of but also not common. It has this irregular service pattern due to its popularity with walkers and bird-spotters as it is located next to the RSPB Buckenham Marshes and RSPB Strumpshaw Fen. The statistics for this period showed the top five least used stations to be:

2000/2001 Period
Position	Station Name	Station Location	Usage Figure
1	Buckenham	Norfolk	22
2	Barry Links	Angus	31
3	Gainsborough Central	Lincolnshire	31
4	Pilning	Gloucestershire	36
5	Coombe Junction Halt	Cornwall	44

=== Period between 1999 and 2000 ===
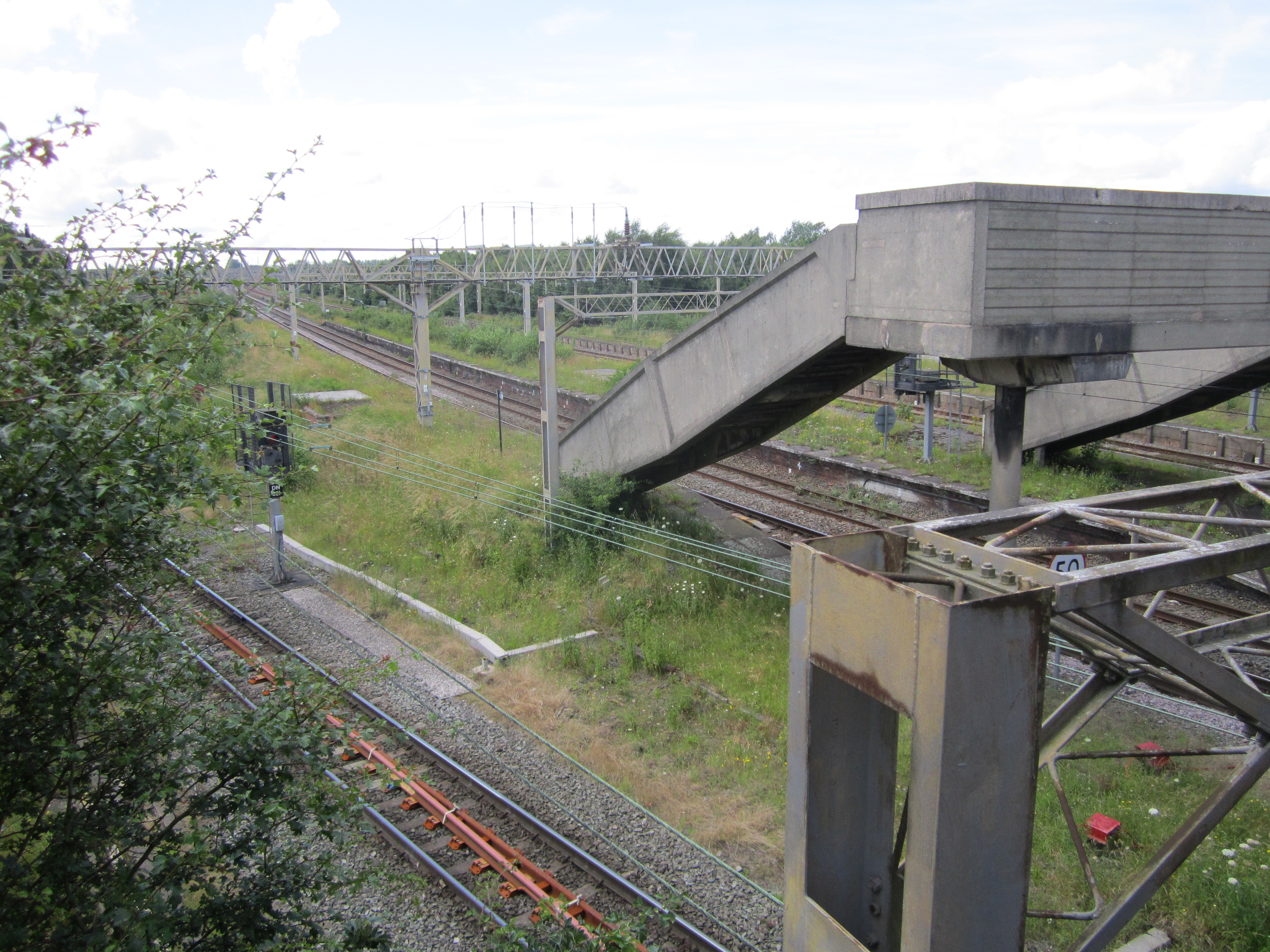
The former platforms of Ditton in 2012

The least used station for this period was Ditton, despite having no services since 1994. The reason it still ranks in this period despite it having no services is because someone purchased a ticket to and from this station. Unusually, this period, a station was created in the data under the name of "King's Cross St Pancras" which recorded only 41 passengers despite the usage for both stations individually being many thousands of times greater. The statistics for this period showed the top five least used stations to be:

1999/2000 Period
Position	Station Name	Station Location	Usage Figure
1	Ditton	Cheshire	1
2	Coombe Junction Halt	Cornwall	14
3	Buckenham	Norfolk	18
4	Gainsborough Central	Lincolnshire	19
5	Pilning	Gloucestershire	23

== See also ==
- Parliamentary train
- Closure by stealth
- Railway stations not officially closed with no services in the United Kingdom
