= Balmossie railway station =

Railway station in Angus, Scotland

Balmossie Scottish Gaelic: Baile Mosaidh
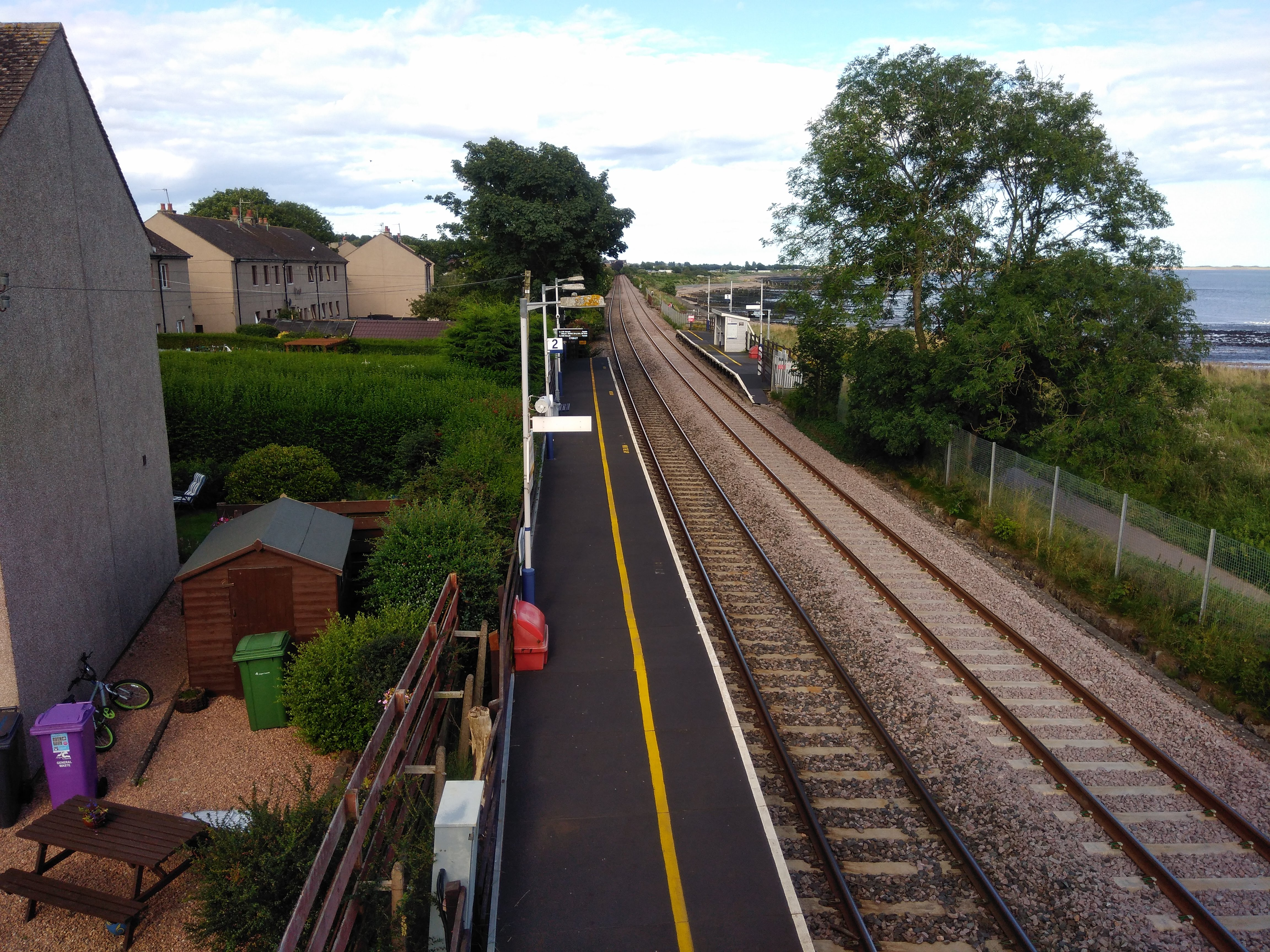

General information
- Location: Monifieth, Angus; Scotland
- Coordinates: 56.4747°N 2.8384°W
- Grid reference: NO484317
- Manager: ScotRail
- Platforms: 2

Other information
- Station code: BSI

History
- Original company: British Railways Scottish Region

Key dates
- 18 June 1962: Opened as Balmossie Halt
- 16 May 1983: Renamed Balmossie

Passengers
- 2021/22: ▲1,172
- 2022/23: ▼834
- 2023/24: ▲1,186
- 2024/25: ▲1,708
- 2025/26: ▲1,948
Location
Notes
- Passenger statistics from the Office of Rail and Road

Balmossie railway station is a small railway station at the border between Dundee and Angus which serves the east of Broughty Ferry and the west of Monifieth. It is located 5 miles (8 kilometres) from the former Dundee East station, on the Dundee to Aberdeen line, between Broughty Ferry and Monifieth. ScotRail, who manage the station, operate all services.

== History ==
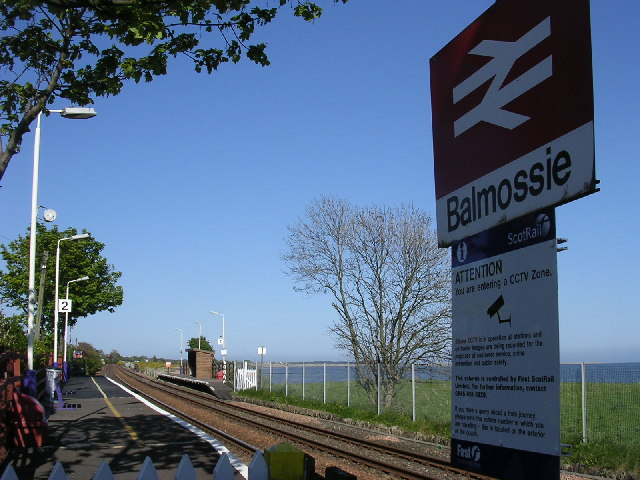
The station seen from one of the platforms in 2005

The station was originally opened on 18 June 1962 as Balmossie Halt by British Rail Scottish Region and renamed as Balmossie on 16 May 1983.

== Facilities ==
Facilities are very basic, comprising a bench on platform 2, and a shelter on platform 1. There is step-free access to both platforms, including via a ramped footbridge. As there are no facilities to purchase tickets, passengers must buy one in advance, or from the guard on the train.

== Passenger volume ==
Passenger Volume at Balmossie
	2004–05	2005–06	2006–07	2007–08	2008–09	2009–10	2010–11	2011–12	2012–13	2013–14	2014–15	2015–16	2016–17	2017–18	2018–19	2019–20	2020–21	2021–22	2022–23	2023–24	2024–25
Entries and exits	136	993	1,227	615	406	804	362	314	1,078	1,446	1,092	992	1,364	698	984	1,524	392	1,172	834	1,186	1,708

The statistics cover twelve month periods that start in April.

== Services ==
British Rail operated local passenger services between Dundee and Arbroath until May 1990. Since these were discontinued, most of the intermediate stations have had only a very sparse "parliamentary" service, provided so as to avoid the difficulty of formal closure procedures.

ScotRail provides Balmossie with only two trains a day southbound (one to Dundee and one to Glasgow Queen Street) and one northbound (to Arbroath), Mondays to Saturdays. There is no Sunday service.

Preceding station	National Rail	Following station
Broughty Ferry	ScotRail; Dundee–Aberdeen line Mondays-Saturdays only	Monifieth
	Historical railways	
Broughty Ferry; Line and station open	British Railways; Scottish Region	Monifieth; Line and station open

== Bibliography ==
- Brailsford, Martyn, ed. (December 2017) [1987]. Railway Track Diagrams 1: Scotland & Isle of Man (6th ed.). Frome: Trackmaps. ISBN 978-0-9549866-9-8.
- Butt, R. V. J. (October 1995). The Directory of Railway Stations: details every public and private passenger station, halt, platform and stopping place, past and present (1st ed.). Sparkford: Patrick Stephens Ltd. ISBN 978-1-85260-508-7. OCLC 60251199. OL 11956311M.
- Jowett, Alan (March 1989). Jowett's Railway Atlas of Great Britain and Ireland: From Pre-Grouping to the Present Day (1st ed.). Sparkford: Patrick Stephens Ltd. ISBN 978-1-85260-086-0. OCLC 22311137.
- Quick, Michael (2022). Railway Passenger Stations in Great Britain: A Chronology (PDF) (5th ed.). London: Railway and Canal Historical Society. Archived from the original (PDF) on 15 March 2023.
