= Buddon Siding railway station =

Short-lived railway station in Barry, Angus

Coordinates: 56.4869°N 2.7798°W

Buddon Siding

General information
- Location: Barry, Angus; Scotland
- Platforms: 2

Other information
- Status: Disused

History
- Original company: Dundee and Arbroath Railway
- Pre-grouping: Dundee and Arbroath Railway

Key dates
- July 1910: Opened as Buddon
- 1 September 1914: Name changed to Buddon Siding
- 1914: Closed to passengers
- 1957: Closed to military personnel
Location

Buddon railway station was a Scottish railway station on the Dundee and Arbroath Railway that served the Barry Buddon Training Area from 1910 to 1957.

== History ==
The station opened in July 1910, although there is evidence of it being used earlier by military personnel only. To the south was Buddon Siding. The signal box, which opened in 1907, was on the westbound platform. The station closed to the public on 1 September 1914 but the military later used it in 1939, 1944, 1956 and 1957 for special purposes.

Preceding station	Historical railways	Following station
Barry Links; Line and station open	Dundee and Arbroath Railway	Monifieth; Line and station open
