= Barry Links railway station =

Station in Angus, Scotland

Barry Links Scottish Gaelic: Machair Bharraidh
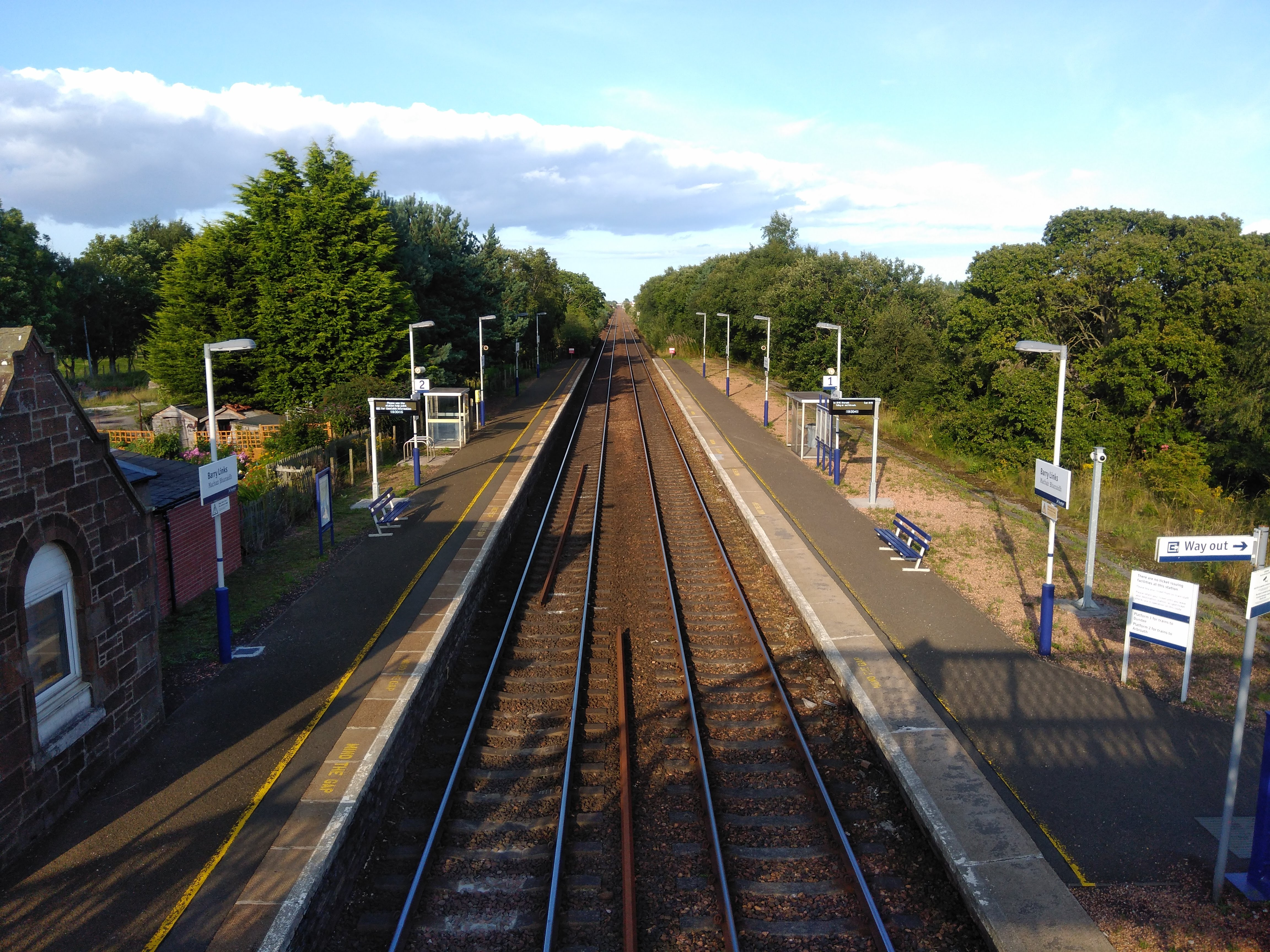

General information
- Location: Barry, Angus; Scotland
- Coordinates: 56.4932°N 2.7456°W
- Grid reference: NO542336
- Manager: ScotRail
- Platforms: 2

Other information
- Station code: BYL

History
- Original company: Dundee and Arbroath Railway
- Pre-grouping: Caledonian Railway
- Post-grouping: LMS

Key dates
- 31 July 1851: Opened as Barry
- 1 April 1919: Renamed as Barry Links

Passengers
- 2021/22: ▲244
- 2022/23: ▲470
- 2023/24: ▲666
- 2024/25: ▼450
- 2025/26: ▼416
Location
Notes
- Passenger statistics from the Office of Rail and Road

Barry Links railway station lies south of the village of Barry, west of Carnoustie in Angus, Scotland. It is sited 8 miles 67 chains (14.2 km) from the former Dundee East station, and is on the Dundee to Aberdeen line, between Monifieth and Golf Street. The station is managed by ScotRail, who provide all the services at the station.

In 2016/17, Barry Links was the least used railway station in the UK with just 24 entries and exits.

== History ==
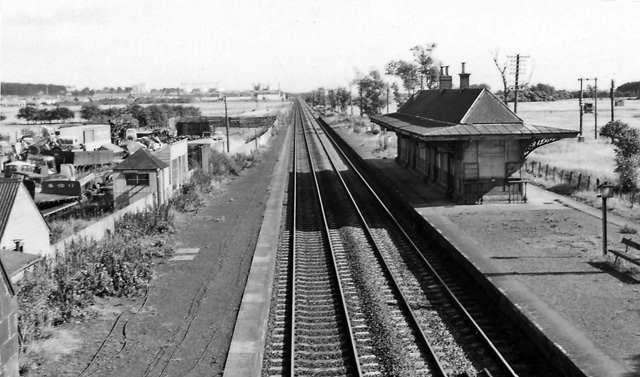
The station in 1974

The station was opened on 31 July 1851 by Dundee and Arbroath Railway, and was named Barry, even though the line through the station had opened thirteen years earlier. The station was renamed to its current name on 1 April 1919, presumably to avoid confusion with Barry station, in South Wales. It is situated between the village of Barry to the north and Barry Links, the coastal links to the south, hence the name.

== Facilities ==
Both platforms have shelters and benches, whilst platform 2 also has cycle racks. Only platform 2 has step-free access. As there are no facilities to purchase tickets, passengers must buy one in advance, or from the conductor on the train.

== Passenger volume ==
In the 2002/03 financial year, only three fare-paying people (excluding season ticket holders) boarded trains at Barry Links station, and five disembarked, making it the least used station in the United Kingdom, tied with Gainsborough Central. In the 2011/12 statistics, Barry Links had the seventh lowest passenger numbers. The low numbers reflect the fact that the service was very sparse at the time. In the 2016/17 statistics, Barry Links again became the least used station in Britain, receiving only 24 entries and exits.

In March 2019, ScotRail apologised for previous poor services across the network and offered season ticket holders, on affected routes, unlimited travel anywhere on the ScotRail network for selected weekends in March–May 2019. This then meant passengers were to buy the cheapest season ticket available between Golf Street and Barry Links, in order to take advantage of this promotion; as a result, the year 2019/20 saw a substantial increase in passenger entries/exits to the station.

Passenger Volume at Barry Links
	2004–05	2005–06	2006–07	2007–08	2008–09	2009–10	2010–11	2011–12	2012–13	2013–14	2014–15	2015–16	2016–17	2017–18	2018–19	2019–20	2020–21	2021–22	2022–23	2023–24	2024–25
Entries and exits	26	28	44	98	94	90	74	86	52	40	60	68	24	52	122	638	184	244	470	666	450

The statistics cover twelve month periods that start in April.

== Services ==
As of May 2026, there is a total of three trains per day: southbound, there are two morning trains (one to Dundee and one to Glasgow Queen Street), whilst northbound there is one evening train to Arbroath. There is no Sunday service.

Preceding station	National Rail	Following station
Monifieth	ScotRail; Dundee–Aberdeen line Mondays-Saturdays only	Golf Street
	Historical railways	
Buddon; Line open; station closed	Caledonian Railway and North British Railway; Dundee and Arbroath Railway	Carnoustie; Line and station open

== Bibliography ==
- Brailsford, Martyn, ed. (December 2017) [1987]. Railway Track Diagrams 1: Scotland & Isle of Man (6th ed.). Frome: Trackmaps. ISBN 978-0-9549866-9-8.
- Butt, R. V. J. (October 1995). The Directory of Railway Stations: details every public and private passenger station, halt, platform and stopping place, past and present (1st ed.). Sparkford: Patrick Stephens Ltd. ISBN 978-1-85260-508-7. OCLC 60251199. OL 11956311M.
- Jowett, Alan (March 1989). Jowett's Railway Atlas of Great Britain and Ireland: From Pre-Grouping to the Present Day (1st ed.). Sparkford: Patrick Stephens Ltd. ISBN 978-1-85260-086-0. OCLC 22311137.
- Jowett, Alan (2000). Jowett's Nationalised Railway Atlas (1st ed.). Penryn, Cornwall: Atlantic Transport Publishers. ISBN 978-0-906899-99-1. OCLC 228266687.
- Quick, Michael (2022). Railway Passenger Stations in Great Britain: A Chronology (PDF) (5th ed.). London: Railway and Canal Historical Society. Archived from the original (PDF) on 15 March 2023.
