= Carnoustie railway station =

Railway station in Angus, Scotland

Carnoustie Scottish Gaelic: Càrn Ùstaidh
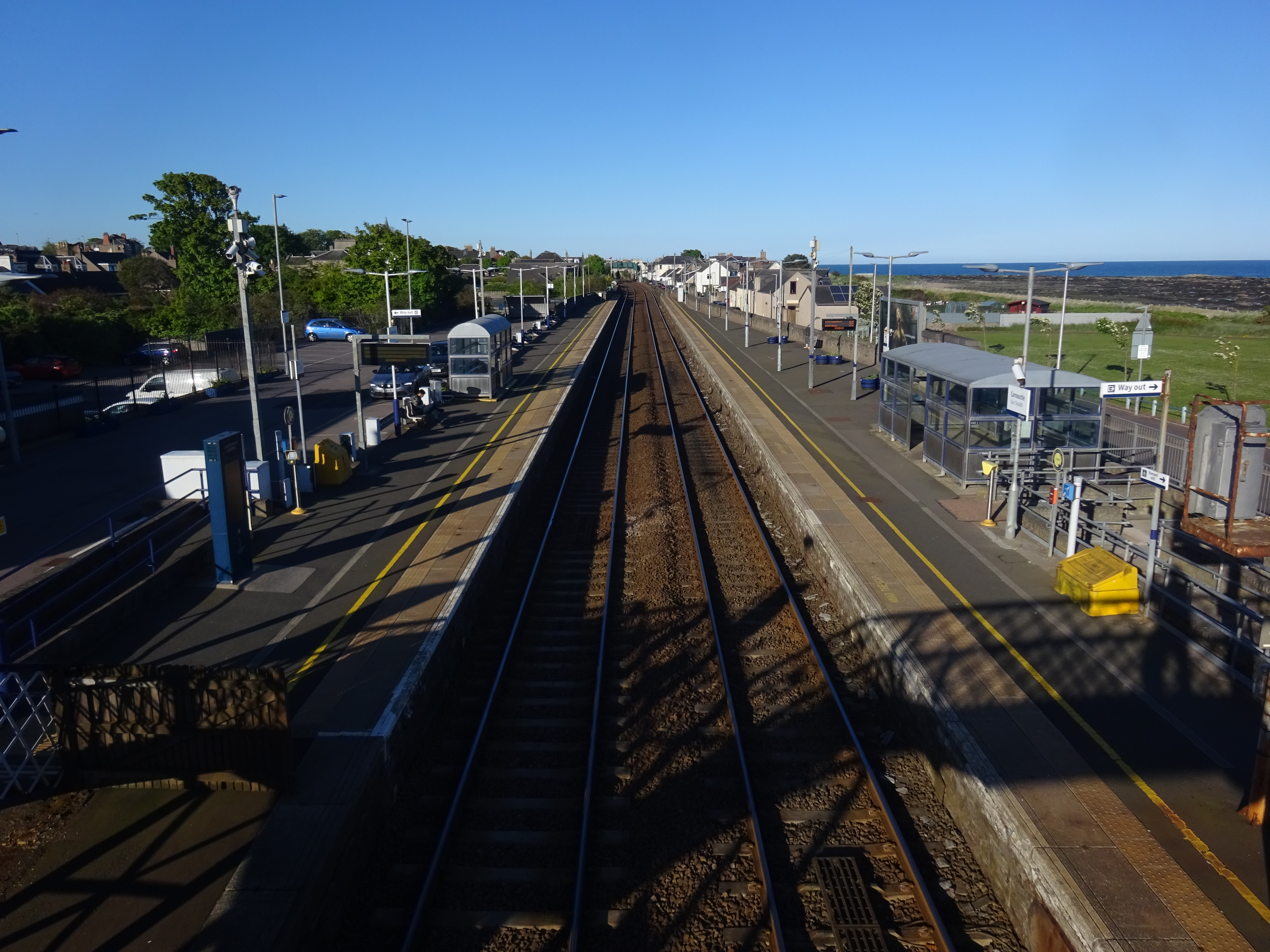
- Carnoustie railway station in 2024

General information
- Location: Carnoustie, Angus; Scotland
- Coordinates: 56.5007°N 2.7053°W
- Grid reference: NO566345
- Managed by: ScotRail
- Platforms: 2

Other information
- Station code: CAN

History
- Original company: Dundee and Arbroath Railway

Key dates
- 6 October 1838: Opened
- 1900: Station relocated

Passengers
- 2020/21: ▼18,674
- 2021/22: ▲82,578
- 2022/23: ▲0.100 million
- 2023/24: ▲0.133 million
- 2024/25: ▲0.137 million
Location
Notes
- Passenger statistics from the Office of Rail and Road

Carnoustie railway station is a railway station which serves the town of Carnoustie, Angus, Scotland. It is sited 10 miles 33 chains (16.8 km) east of the former Dundee East station, on the Dundee to Aberdeen line, between Golf Street and Arbroath. There is a crossover at the south end of the station, which can be used to facilitate trains turning back if the line north to Arbroath is blocked. ScotRail manage the station and provide almost all services.

== History ==
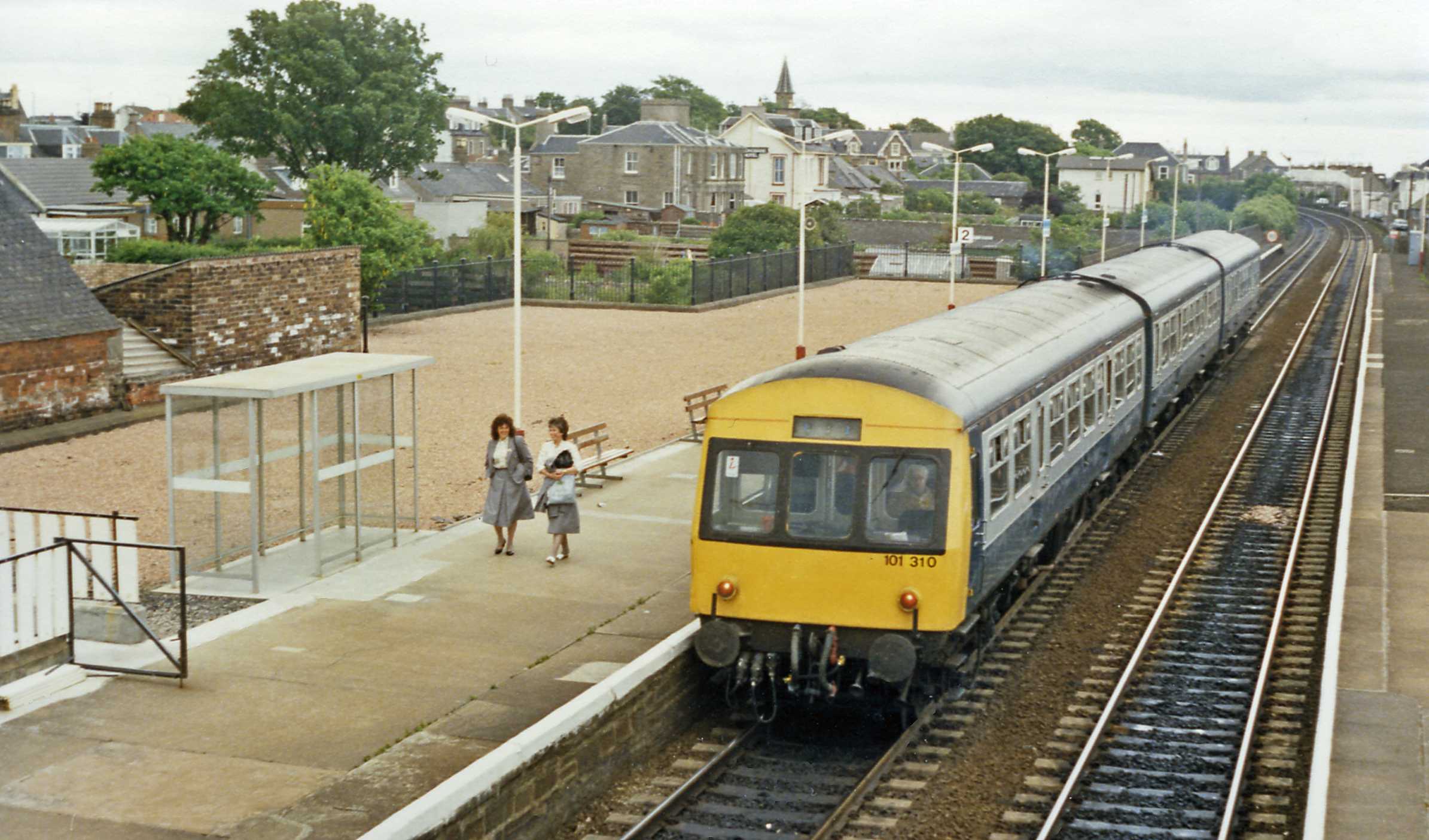
Looking east across the station, 1988

The station was opened on 6 October 1838 on the 5 ft 6 in (1,676 mm) gauge Dundee and Arbroath Railway. The station was originally built on the west side of Station Road, to the north of the running line. The goods yard was to the north of the station and mostly accessed via a turntable. The railway changed to standard gauge in 1847.

In 1900 the station was relocated to the other side of the running line and to the other side of Station Road, the goods yard remained where it was and expanded into some of the space the station had used, by this time the access became the usual set of points. The goods yard was able to accommodate most types of goods including live stock and was equipped with a three-ton crane.

A camping coach was positioned here by the Scottish Region from 1956 to 1960, which was replaced in 1961 by a Pullman camping coach. This was joined by another Pullman in 1964 until 1967 when they were withdrawn.

== Facilities ==
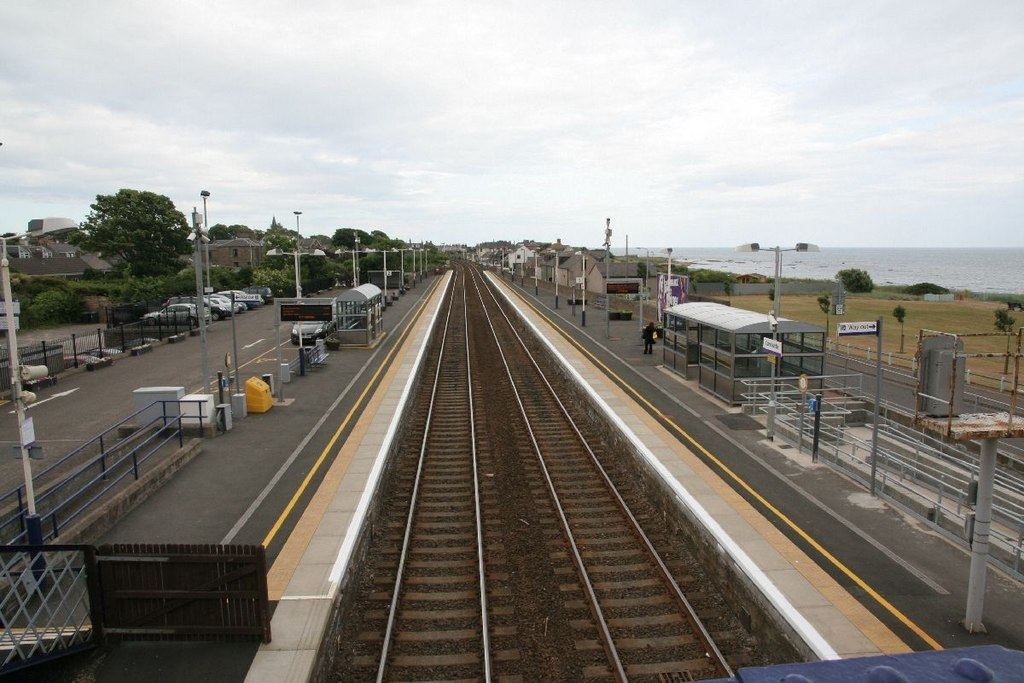
The station as seen from the footbridge, 2010

There are shelters, benches and help points on both platforms, whilst platform 1 is also equipped with a ticket machine. There is a car park, and cycle racks, adjoining platform 2. Both platforms have step-free access, and are linked by a footbridge.

== Passenger volume ==
Passenger Volume at Carnoustie
	2004–05	2005–06	2006–07	2007–08	2008–09	2009–10	2010–11	2011–12	2012–13	2013–14	2014–15	2015–16	2016–17	2017–18	2018–19	2019–20	2020–21	2021–22	2022–23	2023–24	2024–25
Entries and exits	55,507	66,800	71,184	145,700	92,268	91,508	91,740	100,698	107,758	120,432	123,928	123,920	119,278	127,364	200,460	133,828	18,674	82,578	100,084	132,740	137,292

The statistics cover twelve month periods that start in April.

== Services ==
As of May 2026, there is a roughly hourly service in each direction, between Dundee and Arbroath, with some trains to Aberdeen, Glasgow Queen Street and Edinburgh Waverley. The Caledonian Sleeper also picks up (southbound) and sets down (northbound) passengers here. On Sundays, going northbound, there are 5 trains a day to Aberdeen. Going southbound, there 4 trains to Edinburgh (including the Caledonian Sleeper), 1 to Glasgow Queen Street and 1 to Perth.

Preceding station	National Rail	Following station
Golf Street	ScotRail; Dundee–Aberdeen line	Arbroath
Dundee	Caledonian Sleeper	Arbroath
	Historical railways	
Barry Links; Line and Station open	Dundee and Arbroath Railway	Easthaven; Line open; Station closed
