= Golf Street railway station =

Railway station in Angus, Scotland

Golf Street Scottish Gaelic: Sràid a' Ghoilf
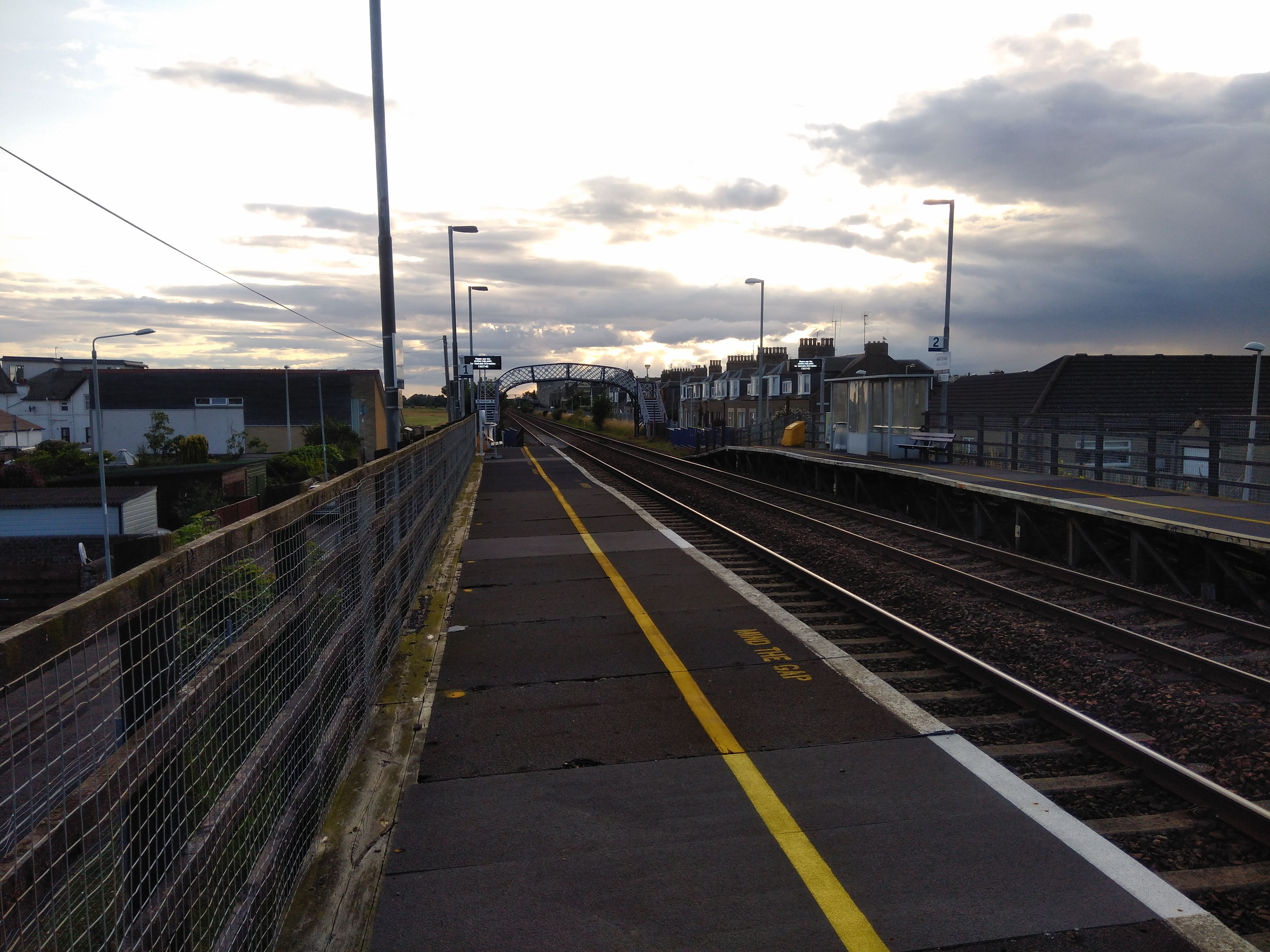

General information
- Location: Carnoustie, Angus; Scotland
- Coordinates: 56.4980°N 2.7200°W
- Grid reference: NO557342
- Manager: ScotRail
- Platforms: 2

Other information
- Station code: GOF

Key dates
- 7 November 1960: Opened as Golf Street Halt
- 16 May 1983: Renamed as Golf Street

Passengers
- 2021/22: ▲518
- 2022/23: ▲906
- 2023/24: ▲1,016
- 2024/25: ▲1,292
- 2025/26: ▼948
Location
Notes
- Passenger statistics from the Office of Rail and Road

Golf Street railway station is located on Golf Street in Carnoustie, Angus, Scotland, and serves the town's central areas. It is sited 9 miles 70 chains (15.9 km) from the former Dundee East station, on the Dundee to Aberdeen line, between Barry Links and Carnoustie. ScotRail, who manage the station, operate all services.

== History ==
The station opened on 7 November 1960 as Golf Street Halt before changing its name on 16 May 1983.

== Location ==
The station is the nearest to the Carnoustie Golf Links. During the 1999 Open Championship, extra services were laid on to bring spectators to the course.

== Facilities ==
Facilities are incredibly low at Golf Street, consisting of just two benches (one on each platform) and a shelter on platform 2. Both platforms have step-free access. As there are no facilities to purchase tickets, passengers must buy one in advance, or from the guard on the train.

== Passenger volume ==
Patronage of the station is currently very low. In the Strategic Rail Authority's 2002/3 financial year, only nine people (excluding season ticket holders) paid fares at Golf Street station, with nine disembarking, making it the third least busy station in the United Kingdom, after Gainsborough Central and neighbouring Barry Links. In 2005/06 there were 65 passenger entries/exits at the station (9th lowest in the UK), but this dropped to 38 (4th lowest) in 2006/07.

In March 2019, ScotRail apologised for previous poor services across the network and offered season ticket holders, on affected routes, unlimited travel anywhere on the ScotRail network for selected weekends in March–May 2019. This then meant passengers were to buy the cheapest season ticket available between Golf Street and Barry Links, in order to take advantage of this promotion; as a result, the year 2019/20 saw a massive increase in passenger entries/exits to the station.

Passenger Volume at Golf Street
	2004–05	2005–06	2006–07	2007–08	2008–09	2009–10	2010–11	2011–12	2012–13	2013–14	2014–15	2015–16	2016–17	2017–18	2018–19	2019–20	2020–21	2021–22	2022–23	2023–24	2024–25
Entries and exits	30	65	38	135	136	190	122	212	112	90	86	168	104	268	280	964	114	518	906	1,016	1,292

The statistics cover twelve month periods that start in April.

== Services ==
British Rail operated local passenger services between Dundee and Arbroath until May 1990. Since these were discontinued, most of the intermediate stations have had only a very sparse ("parliamentary") service, provided so as to avoid the difficulty of formal closure procedures. As of May 2026, there is a total of three trains per day:southbound, there are two morning trains (one to Dundee and one to Glasgow Queen Street), whilst northbound there is one evening train to Arbroath. There is no Sunday service.

Preceding station	National Rail	Following station
Barry Links	ScotRail; Dundee–Aberdeen line Mondays-Saturdays only	Carnoustie

== Bibliography ==
- Quick, Michael (2023). Railway Passenger Stations in Great Britain: A Chronology (PDF) (5th ed.). London: Railway and Canal Historical Society.
