= Arbirlot railway station =

Disused railway station in Arbirlot, Angus

Coordinates: 56.55651°N 2.64114°W

Arbirlot
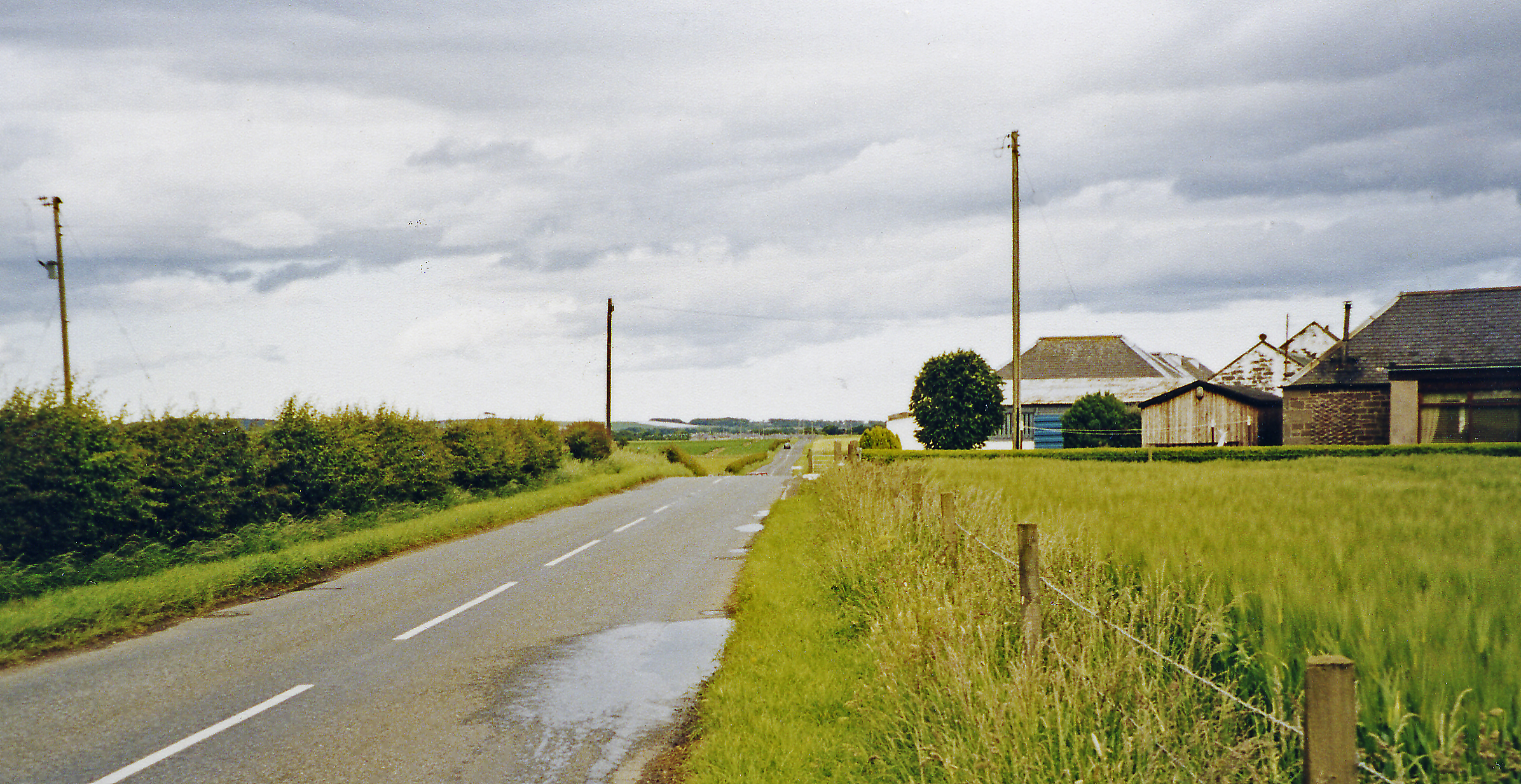
- Location of the station (2002)

General information
- Location: Arbirlot, Angus; Scotland
- Line: Carmyllie Railway
- Platforms: ?

Other information
- Status: Disused

History
- Original company: Dundee and Arbroath Railway
- Pre-grouping: Dundee and Arbroath Joint Railway
- Post-grouping: Dundee and Arbroath Joint Railway

Key dates
- 1 February 1900: Station opens
- 1 January 1917: Station closes
- 1 February 1919: Station reopens
- 2 December 1929: Station closes
Location

Arbirlot railway station served the village of Arbirlot in the Scottish county of Angus. The station was served by a branch line, the Carmyllie Railway, from Elliot Junction on the Dundee and Arbroath Joint Railway running between Dundee and Arbroath.

== History ==
The line opened as a private railway in 1854 but passenger stations, including Arbirlot, opened after a light railway order was obtained. Services started in 1900. The line became a joint North British Railway and Caledonian Railway operation in 1880, and so was run as a joint London and North Eastern Railway and London, Midland and Scottish Railway after the Grouping of 1923. Although passenger services ceased after seven years of this management the goods service passed on to the Scottish Region of British Railways on nationalisation in 1948, and was not withdrawn by the British Railways Board until 1975.

Preceding station	Disused railways	Following station
Elliot Junction	Carmyllie Railway	Cuthlie
