= Craigie railway station =

Temporary railway station in Craigie, Dundee

Coordinates: 56°28′06″N 2°54′27″W

Craigie

General information
- Location: Craigie, Dundee; Scotland
- Platforms: 1

Other information
- Status: Disused

History
- Original company: Dundee and Arbroath Railway

Key dates
- 8 October 1838: Opened
- 9 June 1839: Closed
Location

Craigie railway station served from 1838 to 1839 as the temporary terminus, of the Dundee end of the Dundee and Arbroath Railway.

== History ==
The station opened on 6 October 1838 by the Dundee and Arbroath Railway. It was, at the time the southern terminus of the newly opened the line, south of Broughty Ferry station. The station was intended to be a temporary terminus and it was replaced 8 months later by Roodyards.

Preceding station	Historical railways	Following station
Broughty Ferry; Line and station open	Dundee and Arbroath Railway	Terminus
