= West Ferry railway station =

Disused railway station in Dundee, Scotland

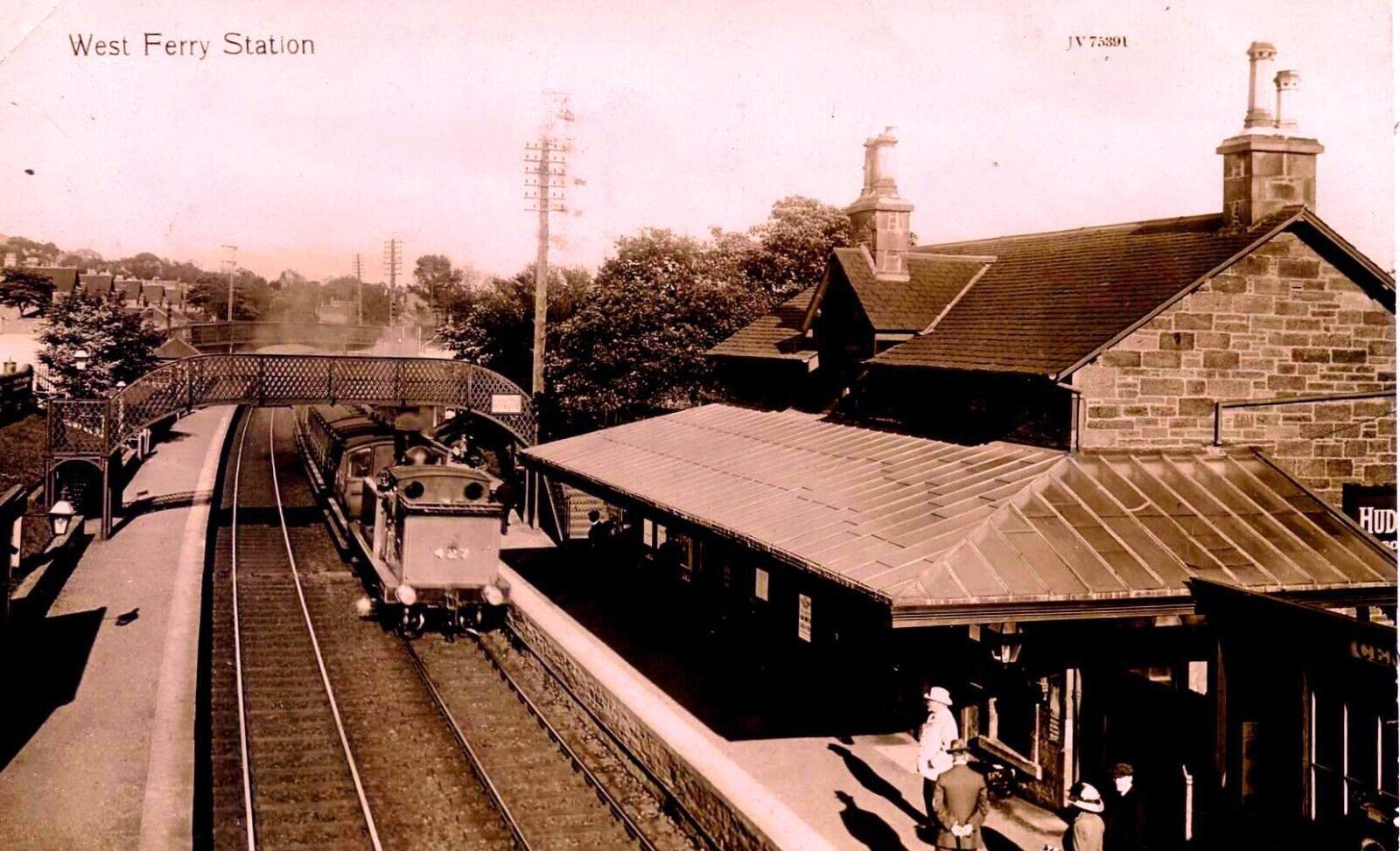
- West Ferry railway station c. 1928

General information
- Location: Broughty Ferry, Dundee; Scotland
- Coordinates: 56.4688°N 2.8869°W
- Grid reference: NO454310
- Platforms: 2

Other information
- Status: Disused

History
- Original company: Dundee and Arbroath Railway
- Pre-grouping: Caledonian Railway and North British Railway
- Post-grouping: London, Midland and Scottish Railway and London and North Eastern Railway

Key dates
- Before 1842: Opened
- 1 January 1917: Closed
- 1 February 1919: Reopened
- 4 September 1967: Closed

Listed Building – Category B
- Designated: 29 October 1991
- Reference no.: LB25921
Location

West Ferry railway station was a railway station in Broughty Ferry which served the West Ferry area of the burgh between at least 1842 and 1967, with a two-year hiatus at the end of the First World War.

== History ==
The date at which the station opened is ambiguous; it is generally understood to have opened during a four-year period between the Dundee and Arbroath Railway beginning operations in 1838 and earliest surviving record of the station receiving passengers in 1842. The station accommodated wealthy jute barons who commuted between their workplaces in Dundee and their mansions on the western periphery of Broughty Ferry.

In 1917 the station's closure was announced. This was met by stiff opposition from locals, who petitioned for its reinstatement. By 1919 the decision had been reversed.

After over 120 years in service, the station finally closed on 4 September 1967 as part of the Beeching cuts. The station accommodated around 100 commuters per day and opposition to the closure was expected. However, improved bus services and the locality of the other station in the town, Broughty Ferry station being just 700 yards (640 m) away, meant there was no significant justification for British Rail to keep the station open.

== Present Day ==
The platforms and canopy were removed as early as 1975, with the footbridge also being dismantled in the years after the station's closure. However, the building which housed the waiting room is now a B-listed private residence.

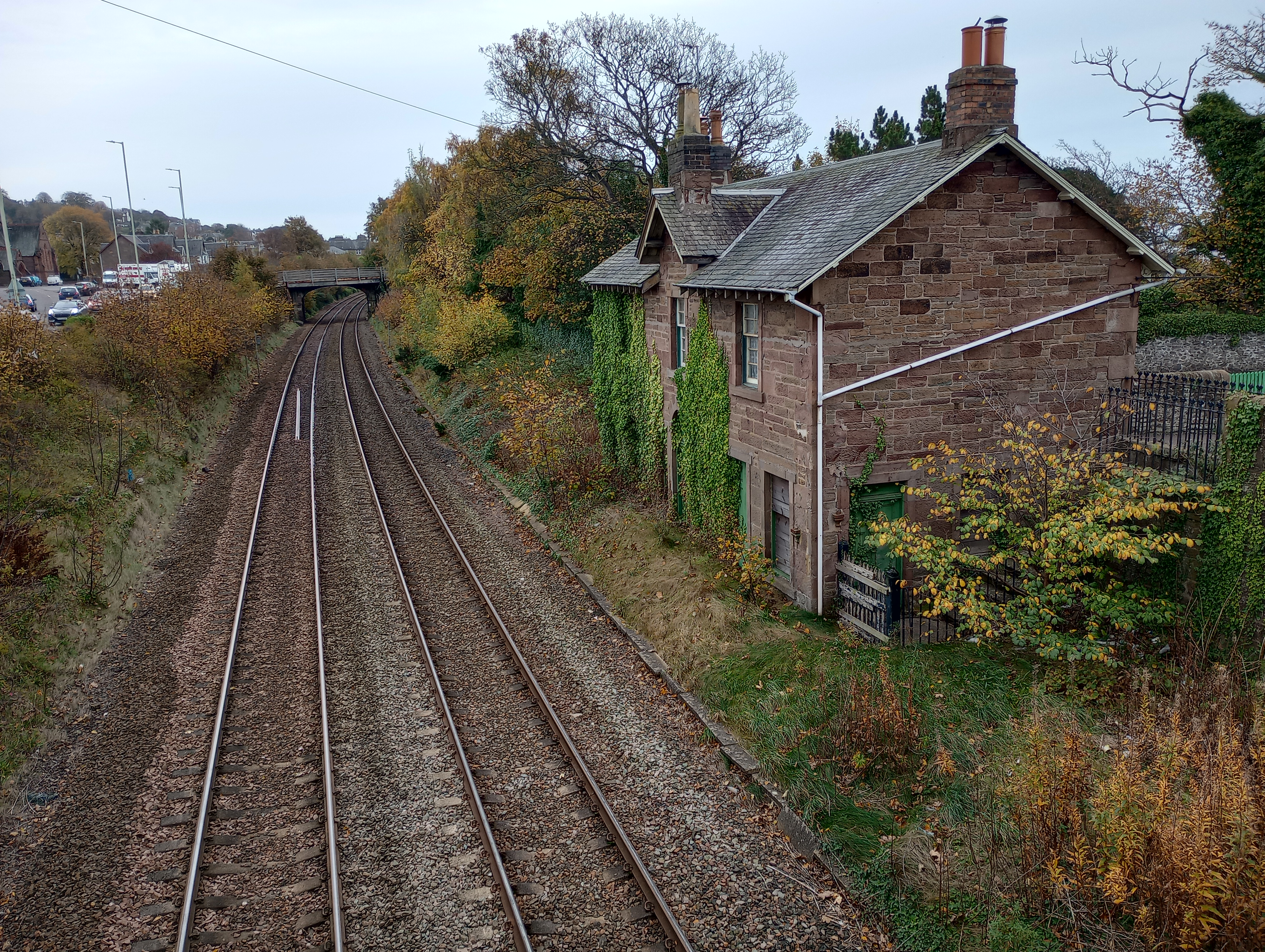
The site of the former station in 2022

When the building was put up for sale in 2023 it was noted that the lower level where the waiting room was located was never redeveloped; no indoor toilet was built after the station was closed, with only an outhouse present on the site.

Preceding station	Historical railways	Following station
Broughty Ferry; Line and station open	Dundee and Arbroath Railway	Craigie; Line open, station closed
