= Denhead railway station =

Disused railway station in Denhead, Angus

Denhead

General information
- Location: Denhead, Angus; Scotland
- Coordinates: 56.5716°N 2.6872°W
- Grid reference: NO577423
- Platforms: 1

Other information
- Status: Disused

History
- Original company: Dundee and Arbroath Railway
- Pre-grouping: Dundee and Arbroath Railway
- Post-grouping: Dundee and Arbroath Railway

Key dates
- 1 February 1900: Opened
- 1 January 1917: Closed
- 1 January 1918: Reopened
- 2 December 1929: Closed permanently
Location

Denhead railway station served the area of Denhead, Angus, Scotland from 1900 to 1929 on the Carmyllie Railway.

== History ==
The station opened on 1 February 1900 by the Dundee and Arbroath Railway. To the west was a siding that existed before the station opened and was relaid when it opened. The station closed on 1 January 1917 but reopened in September 1917, although it was only open on Saturdays. It fully reopened on 1 January 1918, before closing permanently on 2 December 1929.

Preceding station	Disused railways	Following station
Cuthlie; Line and station closed	Carmyllie Railway	Carmyllie; Line and station closed
