= Cuthlie railway station =

Disused railway station in Cuthlie, Angus

Cuthlie
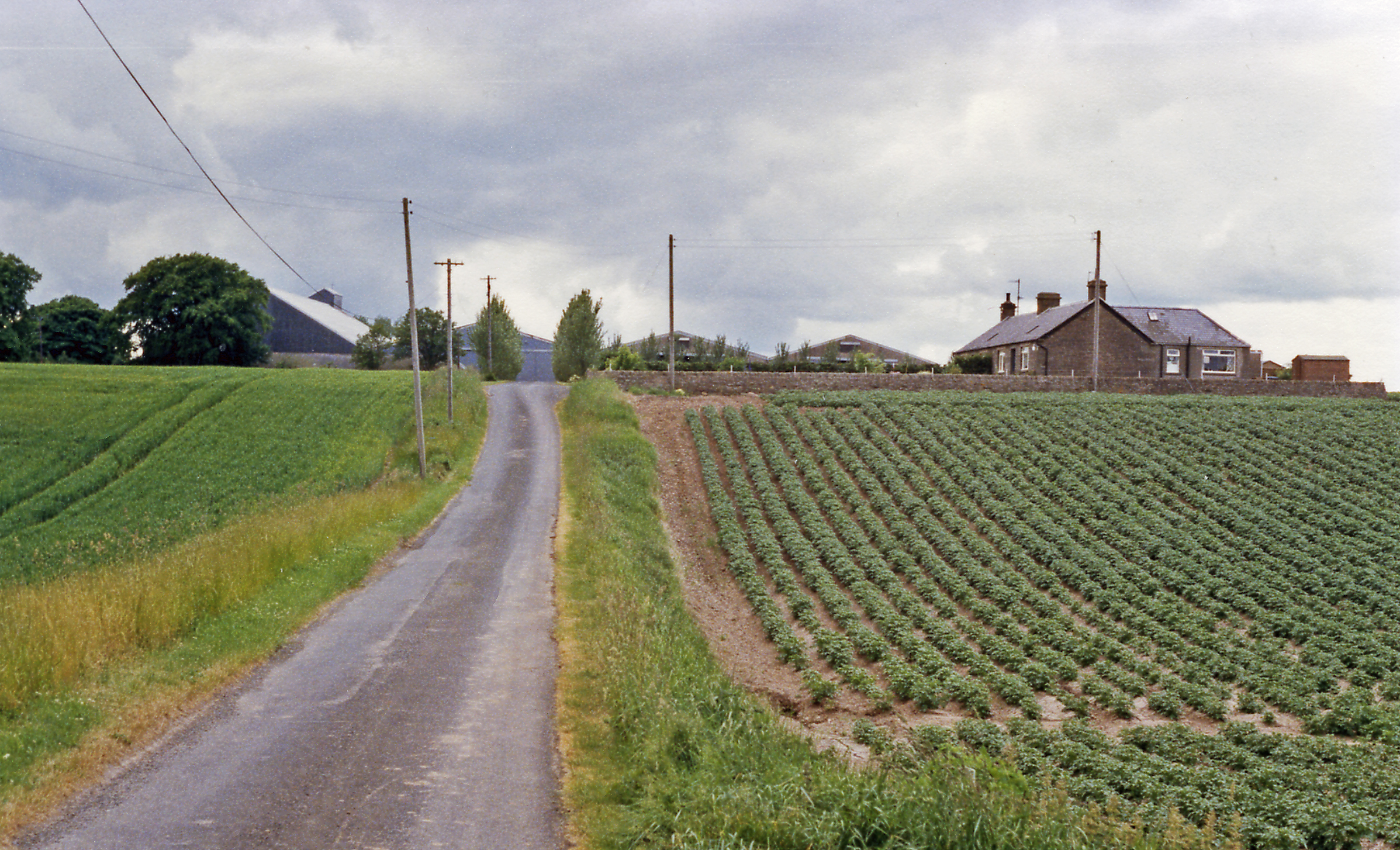
- The site of the station in 1988

General information
- Location: Cuthlie, Angus; Scotland
- Coordinates: 56.5628°N 2.6541°W
- Grid reference: NO599414
- Platforms: 1

Other information
- Status: Disused

History
- Original company: Dundee and Arbroath Railway
- Pre-grouping: Dundee and Arbroath Railway
- Post-grouping: Dundee and Arbroath Railway

Key dates
- 1 February 1900: Opened
- 2 December 1929: Closed to passengers
- 26 May 1965: Closed completely
Location

Cuthlie railway station served the area near Cuthlie Farm in Cuthlie, Angus, Scotland from 1900 to 1965 on the Carmyllie Railway.

== History ==
The station opened on 1 February 1900. To the north was a siding which was shown on OS maps to exist only after the station was built. The station closed to passengers on 2 December 1929 and to goods traffic on 26 May 1965.

Preceding station	Disused railways	Following station
Arbirlot; Line and station closed	Dundee and Arbroath Railway; Carmyllie Railway	Denhead; Line and station closed
