= Carmyllie railway station =

Disused railway station in Carmyllie, Angus

Carmyllie
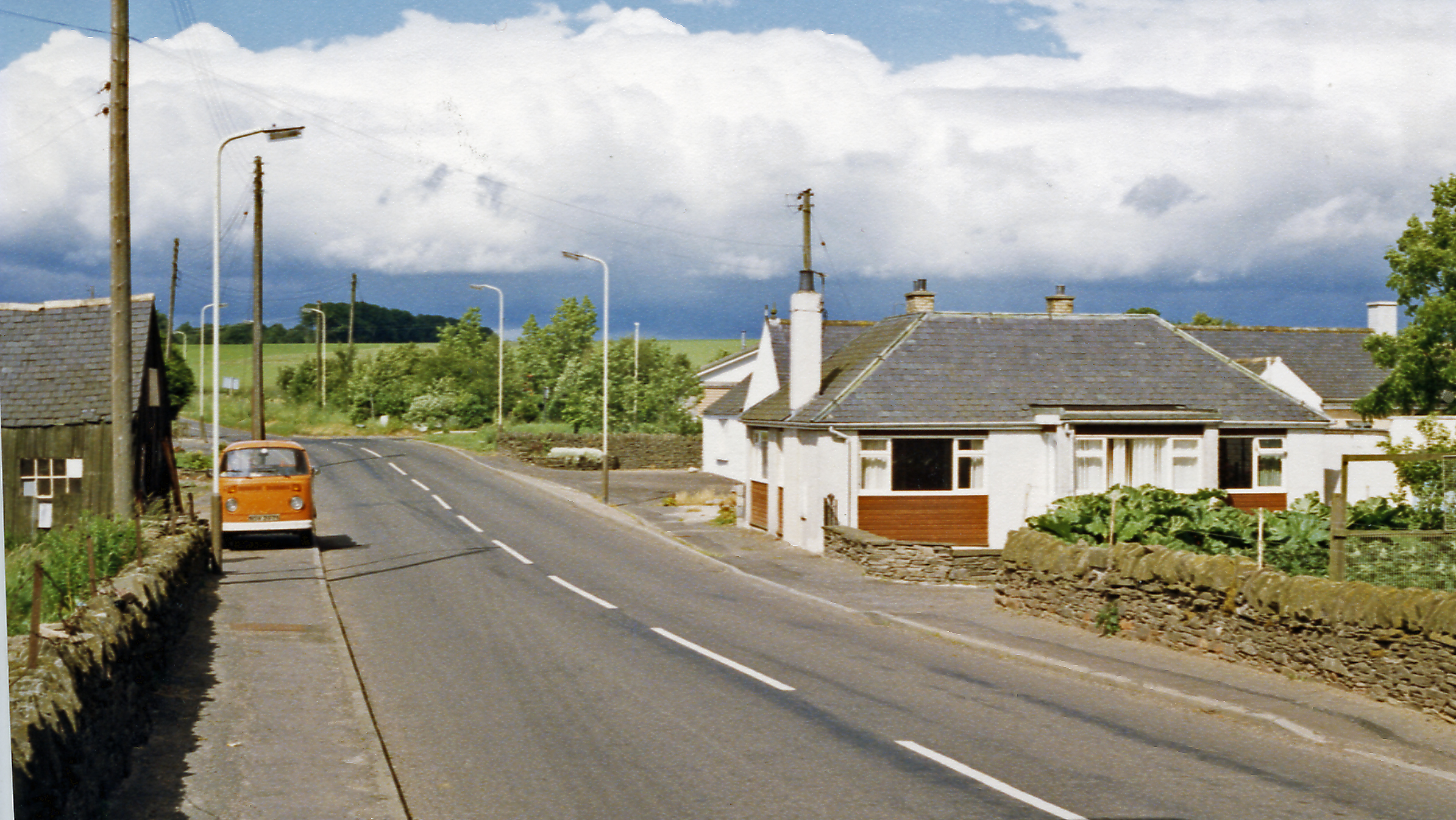
- The site of the station in 1988

General information
- Location: Carmyllie, Angus; Scotland
- Coordinates: 56.5872°N 2.7121°W
- Grid reference: NO562440
- Platforms: 1

Other information
- Status: Disused

History
- Original company: Dundee and Arbroath Railway
- Pre-grouping: Dundee and Arbroath Railway
- Post-grouping: Dundee and Arbroath Railway

Key dates
- 1 February 1900: Opened
- 2 December 1929: Closed to passengers
- 26 May 1965: Closed completely
Location

Carmyllie railway station served the town of Carmyllie, Angus, Scotland from 1900 to 1965 on the Carmyllie Railway.

== History ==
The station opened on 1 February 1900 by the North British Railway. It was the northern terminus of the line. To the north west of the level crossing was a siding that existed before the station opened. The station closed to passengers on 2 December 1929 and to goods traffic on 26 May 1965.

Preceding station	Historical railways	Following station
Denhead; Line and station closed	Carmyllie Railway; Carmyllie Railway	Terminus
