= List of listed buildings in Arbirlot, Angus =

This is a list of listed buildings in the parish of Arbirlot in Angus, Scotland.

== List ==
Name	Location	Date Listed	Grid Ref. (Note: Sometimes known as OSGB36, the grid reference (where provided) is based on the British national grid reference system used by the Ordnance Survey. • "Guide to National Grid". Ordnance Survey. • "Get-a-map". Ordnance Survey.)	Geo-coordinates	Notes	LB Number (Note: Historic Environment Scotland assign a unique alphanumeric identifier to each designated site in Scotland, for listed buildings this always begins with "LB", for example "LB12345".)	Image
Millhill Mill				56°33′23″N 2°39′05″W	Category B	4573	Upload Photo
Main Street, Former School House. "Glenmore" "Arbirlot P.O."				56°33′21″N 2°38′57″W	Category B	4595	Upload Photo
Kellycastle - Doocot				56°33′08″N 2°38′27″W	Category B	4576	Upload Photo
Arbirlot Parish Kirk Manse				56°33′13″N 2°39′00″W	Category B	4597	Upload Photo
Arbirlot Parish Kirk				56°33′19″N 2°38′59″W	Category B	4592	Upload another image See more images
Arbirlot Bridge Over Elliot Water				56°33′17″N 2°38′59″W	Category B	4598	Upload another image See more images
Denside House, (Former Free Church Manse)				56°33′23″N 2°39′02″W	Category C(S)	4599	Upload Photo
Denside House - Doocot				56°33′21″N 2°39′03″W	Category B	4600	Upload another image
Arbirlot - Main Street Opposite Kirk				56°33′20″N 2°38′59″W	Category B	4593	Upload Photo
Kelly Castle				56°33′06″N 2°38′22″W	Category B	4575	Upload Photo
Main Street, Former Parish School				56°33′21″N 2°38′59″W	Category B	4594	Upload Photo
Arbirlot Parish Kirk, - Hearse House				56°33′18″N 2°38′58″W	Category C(S)	4596	Upload Photo
Fairneyknow				56°33′45″N 2°38′01″W	Category C(S)	4574	Upload another image
Arbirlot Primary School				56°32′59″N 2°40′11″W	Category C(S)	49891	Upload another image
Arbirlot Schoolhouse				56°32′59″N 2°40′12″W	Category C(S)	49909	Upload Photo

== Key ==
The scheme for classifying buildings in Scotland is:

- Category A: "buildings of national or international importance, either architectural or historic; or fine, little-altered examples of some particular period, style or building type."
- Category B: "buildings of regional or more than local importance; or major examples of some particular period, style or building type, which may have been altered."
- Category C: "buildings of local importance; lesser examples of any period, style, or building type, as originally constructed or moderately altered; and simple traditional buildings which group well with other listed buildings."

In March 2016 there were 47,288 listed buildings in Scotland. Of these, 8% were Category A, and 50% were Category B, with the remaining 42% being Category C.

== See also ==
- List of listed buildings in Angus
