= Broughty Ferry Pier railway station =

Disused railway station in Broughty Ferry, Dundee

Broughty Ferry Pier
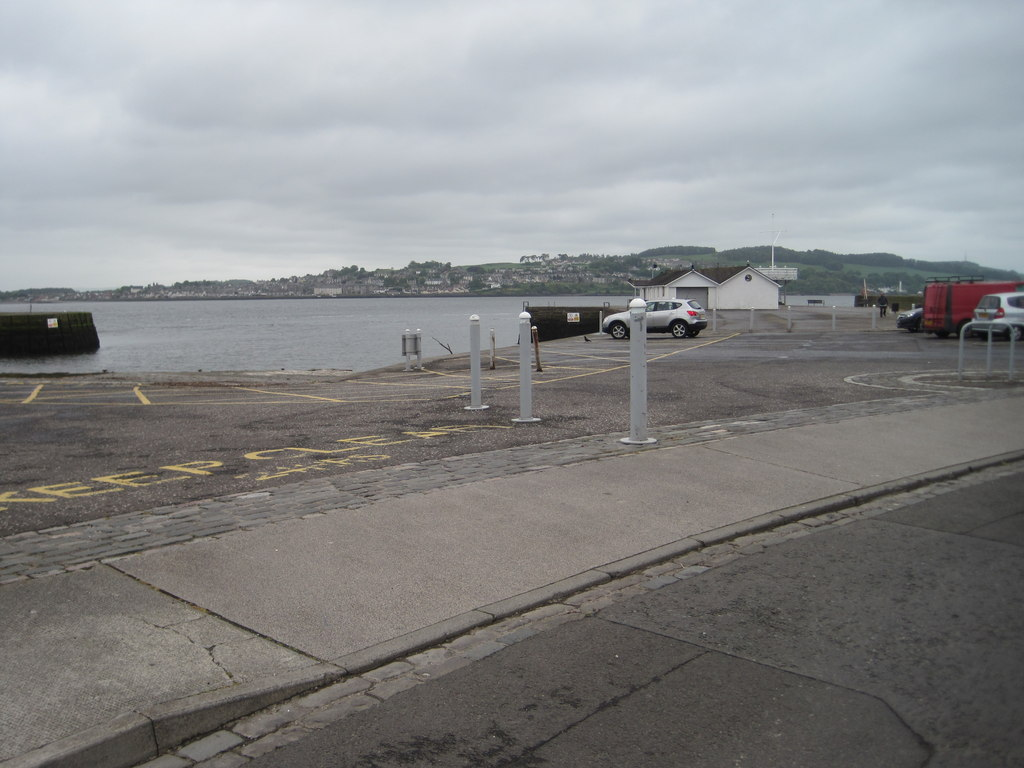
- The site of the station, looking south, in 2014

General information
- Location: Broughty Ferry, Dundee; Scotland
- Coordinates: 56.4638°N 2.8718°W
- Grid reference: NO463305
- Platforms: 2

Other information
- Status: Disused

History
- Original company: Dundee and Arbroath Railway
- Pre-grouping: Dundee and Arbroath Railway; Caledonian Railway

Key dates
- 17 May 1848: Opened
- 1 June 1878: Closed
- 1 March 1880: Reopened
- 19 June 1887: Closed
Location

Broughty Ferry Pier railway station served the suburb of Broughty Ferry, Dundee, Scotland from 1848 to 1887 on the Dundee and Arbroath Railway.

== History ==
The station opened on 17 May 1848 by the Dundee and Arbroath Railway. It was situated on the harbour pier at Broughty Ferry castle. The station closed on 1 June 1878 upon opening of the Tay Railway Bridge. It reopened following collapse of the Tay Railway bridge and station again closed to both passengers and goods traffic in 1887 when the railway bridge reopened.

Preceding station	Historical railways	Following station
Monifieth; Line closed, station open	Dundee and Arbroath Railway	Broughty Ferry; Line closed, station open
