= Easthaven railway station =

Disused railway station in East Haven, Angus

East Haven

General information
- Location: East Haven, Angus; Scotland
- Coordinates: 56.515222°N 2.668851°W
- Grid reference: NO589361
- Platforms: 2

Other information
- Status: Disused

History
- Original company: Dundee and Arbroath Railway
- Pre-grouping: Caledonian Railway and North British Railway
- Post-grouping: London, Midland and Scottish Railway and London and North Eastern Railway

Key dates
- 8 October 1838: Opened
- 4 September 1967: Closed
Location

Easthaven railway station served the village of East Haven, Angus, Scotland from 1838 to 1967 on the Dundee and Arbroath Railway.

== History ==
The station opened on 8 October 1838 by the Dundee and Arbroath Railway. To the west was the goods yard and the signal box, which both closed in 1965. The station closed on 4 September 1967.

Preceding station	Historical railways	Following station
Elliot Junction; Line open, station closed	Dundee and Arbroath Railway	Carnoustie; Line and station open
