= Elliot, Angus =

Hamlet in Angus, Scotland

Coordinates: 56.544143°N 2.621218°W

Elliot
- Location within Angus
- OS grid reference: NO619393
- Council area: Angus
- Lieutenancy area: Angus
- Country: Scotland
- Sovereign state: United Kingdom
- Post town: Arbroath
- Postcode district: DD11
- Dialling code: 01241
- Police: Scotland
- Fire: Scottish
- Ambulance: Scottish
- UK Parliament: Angus
- Scottish Parliament: Angus South

Elliot is a coastal hamlet in the county of Angus, Scotland, on the westernmost edge of Arbroath on the A92 road. The Elliot Water reaches the North Sea at Elliot.

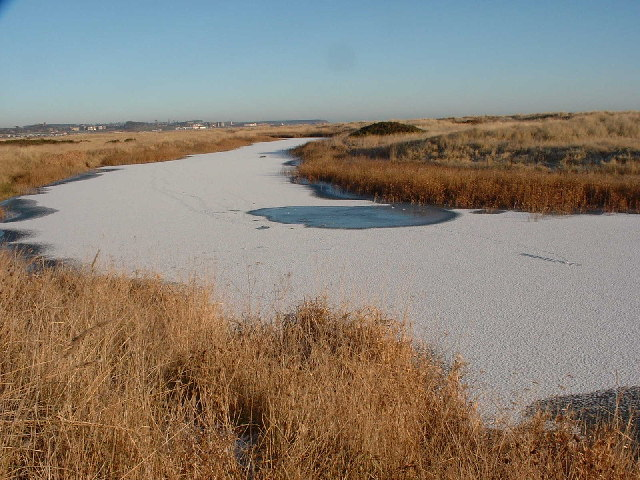
Elliot Water, near Elliot, frozen over

In 1906 Elliot Junction station (now demolished) was the site of a major railway accident in which 22 passengers were killed.

The hamlet is served by the X7 Coastrider bus.
