= Roodyards railway station =

Disused railway station in Dundee, Scotland

Roodyards
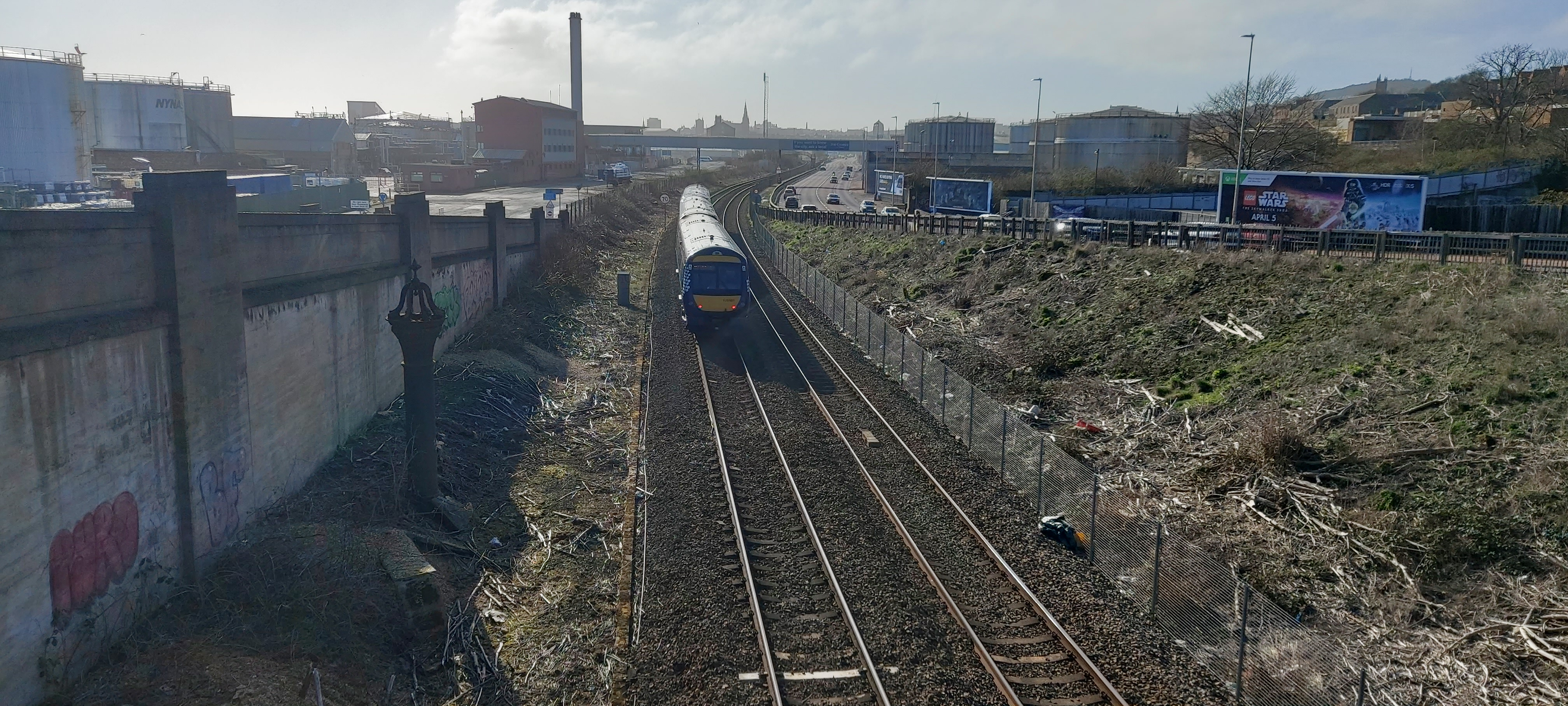
- Train runs past the approximate location of Roodyards Station, but there is no evidence of the station left

General information
- Location: Dundee; Scotland
- Coordinates: 56°27′58″N 2°56′41″W
- Platforms: 1

Other information
- Status: Disused

History
- Original company: Dundee and Arbroath Railway

Key dates
- 9 June 1839: Opened
- 9 April 1840: Closed
Location

Roodyards railway station served Roodyards Road in Dundee, Scotland from 1839 to 1840 on the Dundee and Arbroath Railway.

== History ==
The station opened on 9 June 1839 by the Dundee and Arbroath Railway. It was situated at the south end of Roodyards Road and was the southern terminus of the line until 9 April 1840.

Preceding station	Historical railways	Following station
Broughty Ferry; Line and station open	Dundee and Arbroath Railway	Terminus
