= Arbirlot Primary School =

Location
- Arbirlot; Arbroath, Angus; Scotland; 56.55388°N 2.66055°W

Information
- Type: Non denominational, State Primary School with attached Nursery School
- Established: 1876
- Local authority: Angus Council
- Head teacher: Kerry Walker
- Gender: mixed
- Age: 3 to 12
- Enrolment: approx 27 + 4 nursery (2021)

Arbirlot Primary School is a non-denominational, primary school in the parish of Arbirlot, Angus, Scotland. The school is the successor to various village schools in Arbirlot that have existed since at least the late 10th century.

The children are taught in two composite classes, usually P1-P3 and P4-P7. There are four full-time teachers and one secretary, additionally there are specialist visiting teaching staff, class room assistants and domestic staff. Also parents and other members of the community assist with reading and other activities.

The school buildings date to 1876 (with accommodation for 129 children). The building was listed as a Category C(S) listed building on the Historic Scotland Building register in 2004. It is described as being an 'interesting example of a rural parish school with unusual detailing'.

Two new classrooms were added in the late 1970s. As well as classrooms the school has a combined dining hall and gym, kitchen, staff room, two school offices and library. In 2007 a new playing field was completed as a joint project between Angus Council and the local community.

In 2007 the school was awarded the Foundation for Environmental Education's Green Flag under its Eco-Schools programme.

A nursery class operates from 9:00am to 2:45pm at the school, using one of the original 1876 classrooms.

In 1879 the average attendance was 81 children, and the annual budget was £58.12s.
