= Arbirlot =

Coordinates: 56.557153°N 2.64675°W

- Location within Angus
- OS grid reference: NO602407
- Council area: Angus
- Lieutenancy area: Angus
- Country: Scotland
- Sovereign state: United Kingdom
- Post town: ARBROATH
- Postcode district: DD11
- Dialling code: 01241
- Police: Scotland
- Fire: Scottish
- Ambulance: Scottish
- UK Parliament: Angus
- Scottish Parliament: Angus South

Arbirlot (Gaelic: Obar Eilid) is a village in a rural parish of the same name in Angus, Scotland. The current name is usually presumed to be a contraction of Aberelliot or Aber-Eliot, both meaning the mouth of the Elliot. (Note: However alternative spellings used in the past may not support the "mouth of the Elliot" theory. Timothy Pont's map 26 Lower Angus & Perthshire east of the Tay ca 1583-1614 gives the name of the village as Ardbirlet Kirktoun as does the Blaeu Atlas of Scotland of 1654. This spelling would suggest a different origin for the name. The spelling of historic placenames in the area is notoriously unreliable, for example Hay's History of Arbroath notes that the monks of Arbroath Abbey spelt the name of their own town 32 different ways in a single document - Registorum Abbacie de Aberbrothoc. Miller's Arbroath and its Abbey lists Abereloth, Abireloth, Aberheloth, Aberhelot, Abrellot, Aberellot, Abberellot, Abbirlot, Abbirellot, Abirloth, Arbirloth, Abyrelloth, Arbirlot as samples of the variations in the spelling of Arbirlot in monastic sources.) It is situated west of Arbroath. The main village settlement is on the Elliot Water, 2 1/2 miles (4 km) from Arbroath. There is a Church of Scotland church and a primary school. The school lies 1 mile (1.6 km) further west, in the approximate geographic centre of the parish.

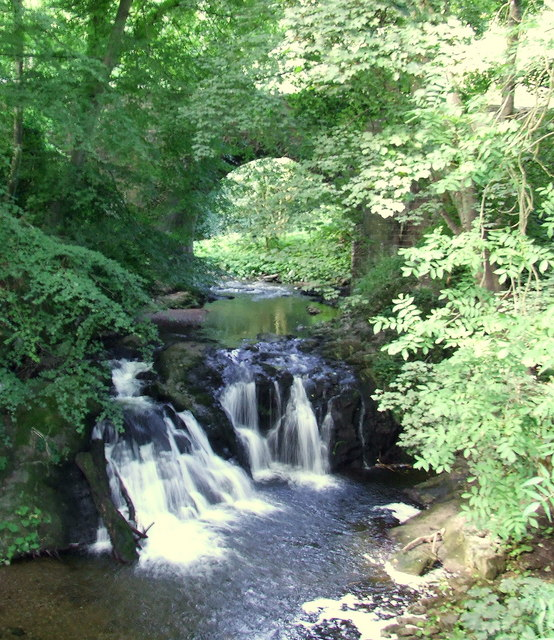
Falls at Arbirlot

== Geology and landscape ==
Arbirlot village, sometimes known as Kirkton of Arbirlot, lies in the Kelly Den, formed by the Elliot Water. The principal underlying rock formation is Old Red Sandstone, and Arbirlot attracted the attention of early geologists because of the exposed rock formations in the Kelly Den. Hugh Miller describes the rock formations in the "pastoral village of Arbirlot" in detail in his highly influential 1841 book Old Red Sandstone.

A nature trail by the Elliot Water links Arbirlot with the former railway junction of Elliot on the Angus Coast. Arbirlot hosts a spectacular 23-foot (7 m) waterfall.

== History ==
=== Prehistoric and Early Christian ===
There is extensive evidence of prehistoric occupation of the Arbirlot area. The First Statistical Account refers to the recent demolition of a "druidical temple" in the parish, the finding of a "Pictish crown", and the presence of numerous stone cairns. Historic Environment Scotland's Canmore database interprets the reference to the "druidical temple" as possibly referring to a stone circle and based on place-name evidence gives a possible location near to Cairncortie in the north-west of the parish. The Second Statistical Account mentions the finding of many stone arrowheads in the parish. There is a cup and ring marked boulder near Craigend.A short cist burial, of a type normally associated with the early bronze age, was excavated near Greenford Farm in 1957, close to where an ancient fortified enclosure was reported in 1910.

There are cropmark indications of a possible Roman marching camp to the west of Grahamston Cottages.

The date of the foundation of Arbirlot Kirk, dedicated to St Ninian, is unknown, although dates as early as the first decades of the 400s have been proposed. The current manse garden contains a standing stone (illustrated) with what are thought to be medieval carvings, although much earlier dates have also been suggested. The stone was retrieved from the foundations of the parish church during re-building works in 1831.

Monastic records give some support to the tradition of a Culdee religious house or "college" in Arbirlot, that was suppressed sometime after the founding of Arbroath Abbey in the late 12th century. The Culdee title of Abbe of Arbirlot continued to appear in records for some years until about 1207 but apparently as an honorific rather than an actual position of authority over a religious community. The First Statistical Account of 1792 relates the demolition of the ruins of a long revered religious house, and early Ordnance Survey maps show the location of the "college" by the Rottonrow Burn.

=== Medieval ===
Prior to the founding of Arbroath Abbey, the church of Arbirlot belonged to the diocese of St Andrews, and the bishops held lands lying to the east of the Elliot Water. Bishop Roger de Beaumont granted the church to the new Abbey around the time of its foundation, but he retained the lands in Arbirlot for the diocese.

The parish suffered from the effects of the First War of Scottish Independence in the late 13th and early 14th centuries as evidenced by the relief granted to the vicar of Arbirlot in March 1323 who was then twenty years in arrears in paying the two merks (Note: A total of £26 13s 6d Scots) due annually to the Abbot of Arbroath Abbey. The relief was granted on the grounds of "the poverty, sterility, and destruction of the parish and its inhabitants, occasioned by the late war".

Kelly Castle (sometimes Kellie Castle or Auchterlony Castle), which overlooks the Elliot Water, comprises a four-storey tower of the late 15th or early 16th century, set within a 19th-century courtyard. It was a stronghold of the Mowbray family until forfeited to the Stewarts in the early 14th century and was restored from a semi-ruined state by the Earl of Dalhousie in the 19th century.

=== Post-Reformation ===
By the 17th century, the barony of Kellie (or Kelly), which included the castle and much of the parish, was in the hands of the Irvines of Drum who, in 1629, committed themselves to annual grants of eight bolls of meal (Note: approximately 960 pounds or 430 kilograms) to the schoolmaster of Arbirlot, and a further 12 bolls to the poor of the parish. In 1679 Alexander Irvine, who had built up unsustainable debts during his support for the Royalist cause during the Civil Wars, sold the barony to George Maule, 2nd Earl of Panmure, for £11,000 sterling.

In the 18th and 19th centuries, Arbirlot was principally occupied by handloom weavers and farmers. The village once had a meal mill, a slaughterhouse, two schools, a post office, a savings bank, an inn, and a parish library, as well as a number of shops. During the Napoleonic Wars, Arbirlot, and in particular the then-ruined Kelly Castle, was a notorious haunt of smugglers conducting an illicit trade with France. In 1830, Thomas Guthrie, later to become a well-known theologian, social reformer and a founder of the Ragged School movement, was appointed to the charge of Arbirlot by the heritor the Hon William Maule. Guthrie served as Minister of Arbirlot for eight years. As well as divinity, Guthrie had studied medicine at Edinburgh and in Paris, which knowledge was to be called upon when the parish suffered an outbreak of cholera.

== Clan Elliot ==
The parish is believed to be the original home of Clan Elliot, which was transplanted in the Scottish Borders to defend the newly crowned Robert the Bruce's Scotland from English invaders, through an intricate network of peel towers. The Elliots joined the clans of Armstrong, Scott, Douglas, Kerr, Nixon, Hepburn and Maxwell in that effort.

== Notable natives and residents ==
- David Black died 1603, minister and Scots Worthy
- George Gladstanes c. 1562 – 1615, minister in Arbirlot c.1592 - 1597, afterwards Bishop of Caithness and later Archbishop of St Andrews
- John Guthrie c. 1580 - 1649, minister in Arbirlot 1603 - 1617, afterwards Bishop of Moray. Supporter of Charles I's religious policies.
- Alexander McGill c. 1680-1734, mason and architect. First City Architect of Edinburgh.
- Rev Thomas Guthrie 1803 – 1873, divine and philanthropist, minister in Arbirlot 1830–1837
- Rev John Kirk 1795–1858, divine and biographer (of Susannah Wesley mother of John Wesley, The Mother of the Wesleys, Jarrold, London 1868), Church of Scotland minister in Arbirlot 1837 – 1843 and later first Free Church of Scotland minister in Arbirlot
- Alexander Carnegie Kirk 1830 - 1892, engineering innovator - particularly of the marine triple expansion steam engine. Elder son of the Rev John Kirk
- Sir John Kirk 1832 – 1922, physician, naturalist, companion to explorer David Livingstone, diplomat, slavery abolitionist and photography pioneer, lived with his parents in Arbirlot as a young man. Younger son of the Rev John Kirk.
- Margaret Fairlie 1891–1963, academic and gynaecologist. The first woman to hold a professorial chair in Scotland.
- Eileen Ramsay born 1940, novelist

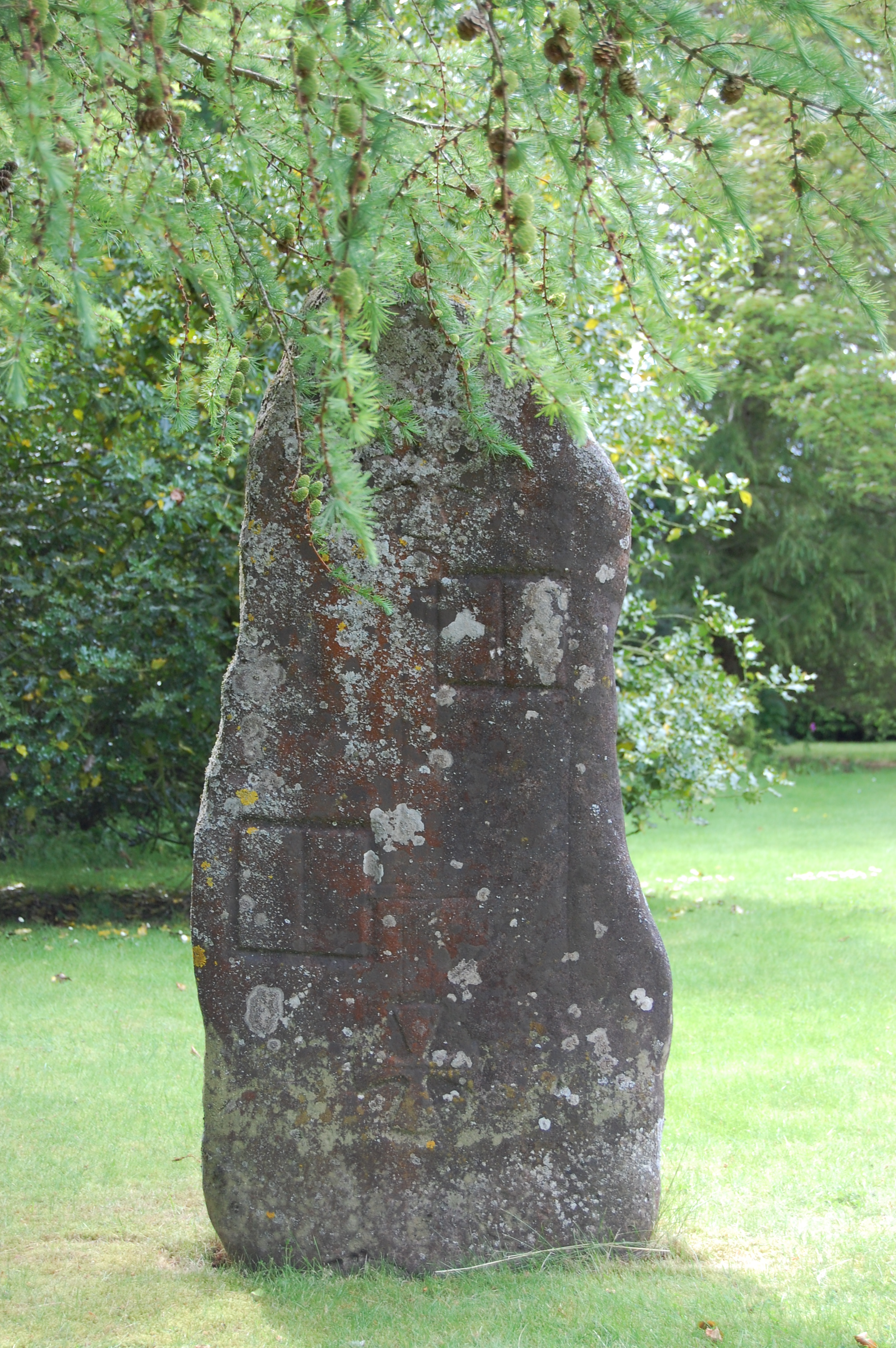
Standing Stone in New Manse garden, by Arbirlot

== See also ==
- Arbirlot Railway Station
- Arbirlot Primary School
- Elliot Water
- List of listed buildings in Arbirlot, Angus
