= Elliot Junction rail accident =

Rail accident

Coordinates: 56°32′47″N 2°37′01″W

Elliot Junction rail crash
- The railway disaster at Ellion Junction (Das interessante Blatt, 1907)

Details
- Date: 28 December 1906; 15:30 (approx.)
- Location: Elliot Junction station, Forfarshire
- Country: Scotland
- Line: Edinburgh to Aberdeen Line
- Incident type: Collision
- Cause: Driver error

Statistics
- Trains: 2
- Deaths: 22
- Injured: 24(16 minor 8 serious)

The Elliot Junction rail accident (Note: The majority of contemporary newspaper reports referred to the incident as the "Arbroath railway disaster".) occurred on 28 December 1906 at Elliot Junction in Forfarshire (now Angus), Scotland. An express hit the rear of a local passenger train, which was just moving off from the station, killing 22 and injuring 24. The immediate cause was driver error, but a snow blizzard had disrupted services, and the driver received only a light sentence.

== Background ==
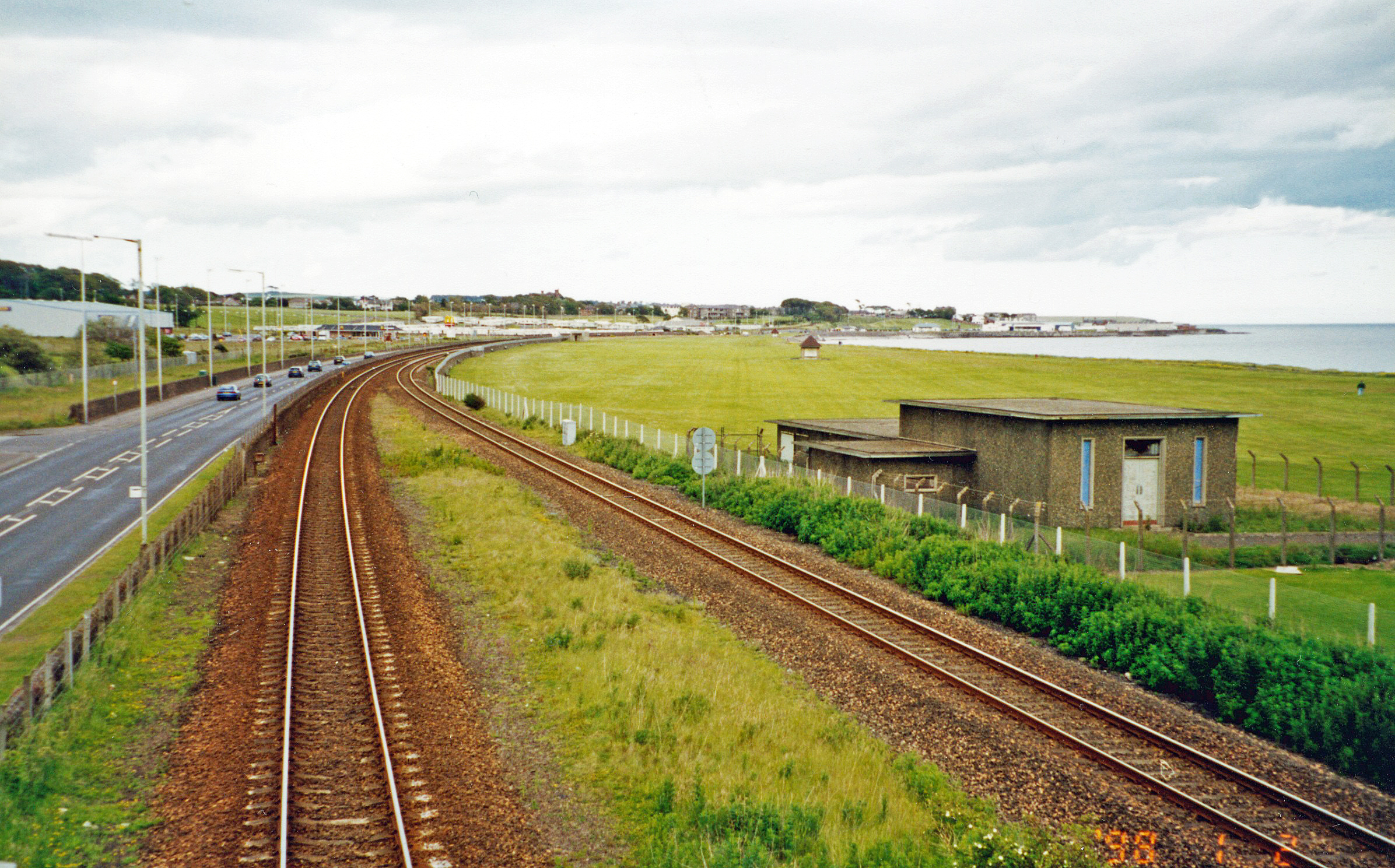
Elliot Junction site, looking north-east

The accident happened during a severe blizzard on 28 December (Note: Coincidentally, this was the anniversary of the nearby Tay Bridge disaster (1879).) 1906 at Elliot Junction station in Forfarshire, Scotland. Now shut, this was situated between the present-day stations of Carnoustie and Arbroath, being closest to the latter, one and a half miles away. In terms of lives lost, the accident was the 10th worst in British railway history up until that point, with 22 fatalities. An additional 8 persons were severely hurt and 16 received minor injuries.

The official inquiry found the driver of one of the trains involved, named Gourlay, to be largely responsible for the tragedy. He was subsequently convicted of culpable homicide and sentenced to 5 months in prison, later reduced to a term of 3 months. The relatively light sentence reflected the opinion of the jury that other factors had played an equal, if not more important role in the accident. Whilst not completely exonerating the driver, a more recent analysis drew attention to the extreme weather and highlighted a number of organizational failures which contributed to the disaster.

== The Accident ==
At around 3.30 p.m., a North British Railway express hit the rear of a local Dundee and Arbroath Railway passenger train, which had just stopped at Elliott Junction and was beginning to move off. Having left King's Cross, London at 11.30pm the previous day, the express departed Edinburgh Waverley for Aberdeen at 7.35 a.m., but due to heavy snowfall over the previous two days had been unable to progress further than Arbroath, where it was due at 9.40am. At the time of the crash it was heading back to Dundee with passengers still on board.

Among the casualties was the Liberal Member of Parliament (MP) Alexander William Black, who was severely injured in the crash and died shortly thereafter.

== The Inquiry ==
The Board of Trade Inquiry placed primary responsibility on the driver of one of the trains who had "failed to heed instructions to drive with caution". It also discussed the role of alcohol and said that "the proximity of the Victoria Bar to the up platform is a very undesirable feature in the surroundings of Arbroath station. The substitution of a coffee shop and refreshment room would be greatly in the general interests of the staff".

== See also ==
- Lists of rail accidents
- List of British rail accidents
