= David Black (minister) =

Scottish minister

- Church: Church of Scotland

Personal details
- Died: 12 January 1603 Dundee
- Occupation: Theologian
- Education: University of St Andrews

David Black was educated at the University of St Andrews. He was admitted to the ministry of the church (on the recommendation of Andrew Melville) as minister of St Andrews in November 1590. Having offended James VI by "certain unreverent, reproachfull and infamous speeches in his sermons", he was summoned before the Privy Council on 18 November 1596, but declined its jurisdiction "in matters spiritual". In this he was supported by "his whole brethren of the ministrie". Twelve days later he lodged a second declinature, but was found guilty on 2 December, and "the penaltie referred to the King's will and pleasure". On 9 December he was ordered to enter his person in ward. The Synod of Fife petitioned the King to restore Black to his charge, but that was not done, and he was translated, and admitted to Arbirlot in 1597. He was presented to the vicarage by James VI on 15 May 1598. "While on his way to Perth he died suddenly at Dundee, of apoplexy, immediately after having given thanks at a meal, Tuesday 12 January 1603. He had preached and dispensed the Communion on the preceding Sunday.

== Political setting ==
With principles so opposite to the spirit of freedom and of the Scottish church, it is not surprising that James and the presbyterian ministers should have been perpetually at variance. The clergy, jealous of their religious rights, openly and vehemently denounced the king's proceedings from the pulpit; and the king, on the other hand, threatened all with civil pains who ventured to condemn his measures, or question his authority as supreme potentate of the church. "There would never be peace," he said, "till the marches were rid between them." Determined, however, to " rid the marches'"' in his own person, he summoned one of the most zealous of their number, Mr. David Black, minister of St. Andrews, to answer before the privy council, for certain treasonable speeches, as he termed them, which he had uttered in the pulpit. Black, in his own name, and in that of his brethren of the ministry, sent in a declinature to the council, denying their authority to sit as judges of his doctrine, in the first instance or till he was tried by the church courts. They saw clearly that this prosecution was put out as a feeler to ascertain how far the church would yield; and, to use their own language, they feared "that their yielding on this occasion would be held as an acknowledgment of his majesty's jurisdiction in matters that are mere spiritual, which might move his majesty to attempt further in the spiritual government of the house of God, and end in either a plain subverting of the spiritual judicature, or at least a confounding thereof with civil, if at any time profane and ambitious magistrates might by such dangerous beginnings, find the hedge broken down, to make a violent irruption upon the Lord's inheritance; which the Lord forbid." (Declinature of the King and Council's Judicature in Matters Spiritual, &c., by Mr. David Black, 18 November 1596.) This struggle for the liberties of the church issued, as might have been expected, in the defeat of the weaker party, and Black was banished from St. Andrews. The king was afterwards so far reconciled to Mr. Black, as to allow his admission into the vacant parish of Arbirlot.

It was the delight of James, however, to gain his object by policy rather than violence; and at length, by a series of stealthy, manoeuvres, which he dignified with the name of kingcrafty he succeeded in overturning the presbyterian polity. His first attempt of this nature was made shortly after this, when he requested the assembly to appoint some of their number, with whom he might advise respecting affairs in which the church might be interested; and the assembly rashly complied, appointing fourteen ministers to act as commissioners for the church. "This," says James Melville, " was the very needle which drew in the episcopal thread." Next year, the king stole another step towards his purpose, by prevailing upon the parliament to declare that prelacy was the third estate of the kingdom, and that such pastors as he pleased to raise to the dignity of bishops should have a right to vote in parliament. The next step was to prevail on the church courts to allow their commissioners to enjoy this enviable privilege. The commissioners themselves do not seem to have been unwilling to comply; and they endeavoured to persuade their brethren that his majesty's, object was merely to maintain the dignity of the ministerial office, and in nowise to bring in the popish or Anglican bishops. But the more clear-sighted saw through the stratagem and protested against it.

== Character ==
He is characterised as a man of singular fidelity and diligence, mighty in doctrine, a powerful preacher, a zealous, faithful, and painstaking pastor, whose ministry was productive of much fruit. He was strongly opposed to Episcopacy.

== Personal life ==
He married Katherine Prattie, who survived him, and had issue — Sarah, who with her mother was recommended to charity by the Synod of Lothian and Tweeddale 4 November 1659.

== Bibliography ==
- Beg. Assig.
- Calderwood's Hist., v. 680 et seq., vi. 184, 195, 290
- Cunningham's Hist, i., 434–5;
- Honyman's Survey, ii.
- Fleming's Fulfilling of Scripture
- G. R. Inhib., xxxi., 14 July 1608
- De Foe's Memoirs
- Alexander Shields' A Hind Let Loose
