= Broughty Ferry railway station =

Railway station in Dundee, Scotland

Broughty Ferry Scottish Gaelic: Port Bhruachaidh
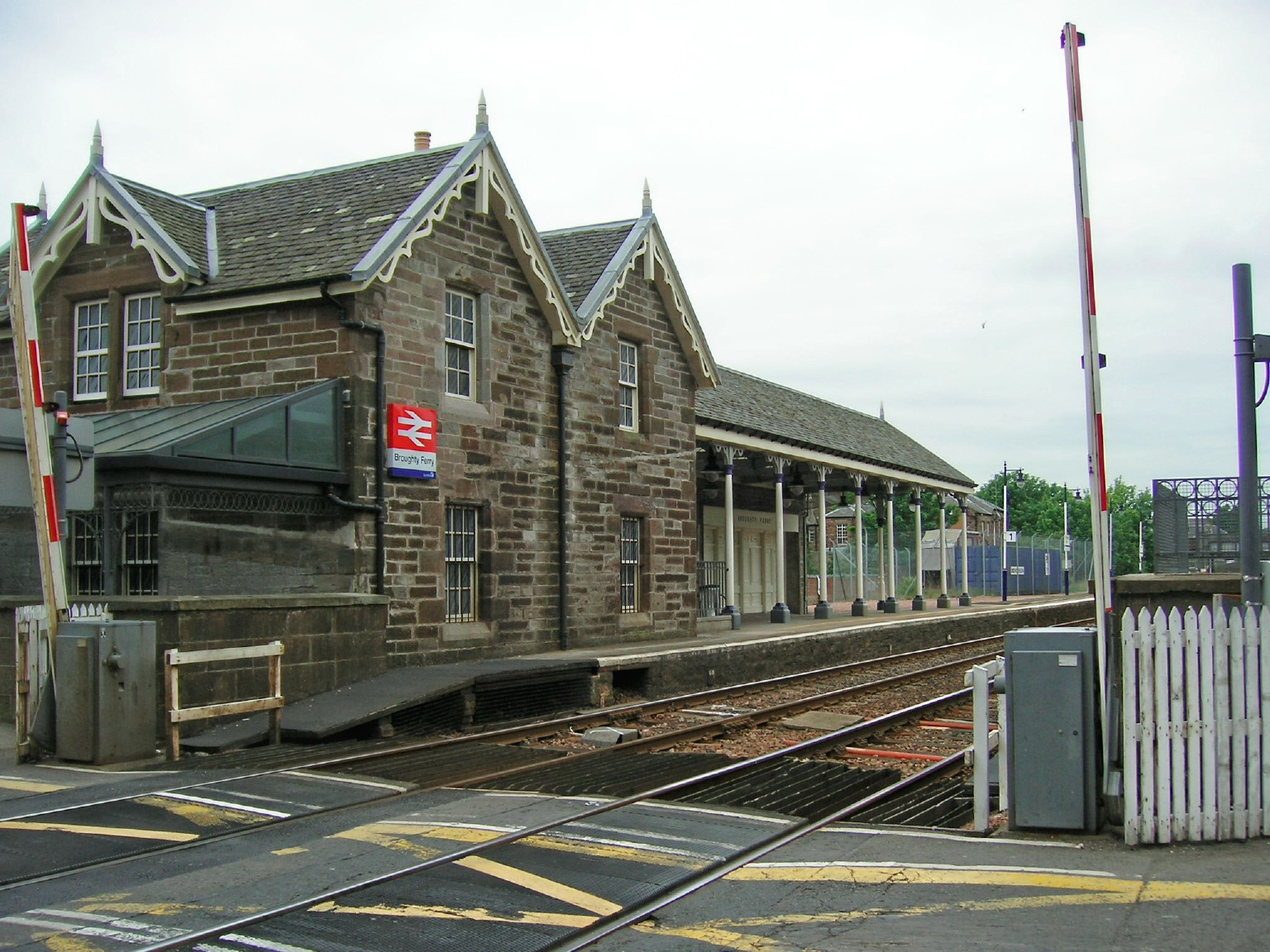
- Broughty Ferry railway station

General information
- Location: Broughty Ferry, Dundee City; Scotland
- Coordinates: 56.4677°N 2.8741°W
- Grid reference: NO462309
- Manager: ScotRail
- Platforms: 2

Other information
- Station code: BYF

Key dates
- 8 October 1838: Opened

Passengers
- 2020/21: ▼21,720
- 2021/22: ▲76,182
- 2022/23: ▲84,268
- 2023/24: ▲0.124 million
- 2024/25: ▲0.149 million

Listed Building – Category A
- Designated: 8 May 1985
- Reference no.: LB25823
Location
- Location within Dundee City council area
Notes
- Passenger statistics from the Office of Rail and Road

Broughty Ferry railway station is a railway station serving the suburb of Broughty Ferry in Dundee, Scotland. It is sited 3 miles 38 chains (5.6 km) from the former Dundee East station, on the Dundee to Aberdeen line, between Dundee and Balmossie.

It is the oldest railway station in Scotland which is still in operation.

== History ==
The station was opened on 8 October 1838 on the Dundee and Arbroath Railway.

Railtrack planned to demolish the station in 1997, although campaigns against the proposals led to a £700,000 development of the station. Although the footbridge was removed, the signal box (built circa 1887) was resited, and refurbished for £650,000 in 2013.

The station underwent refurbishment work in 2018 to raise the platforms for new trains.

=== Accidents and incidents ===
At 7:20 pm on 21 October 1991, a Dundee bound Aberdeen–London Intercity express destroyed two out of the four gates of the level crossing. The fifty passengers on board and five people in a passing car were fortunate to avoid collision when the train passed through the crossing at around 80 miles per hour.

In May 2016, a man died after being hit by a train near the station.

== Facilities ==
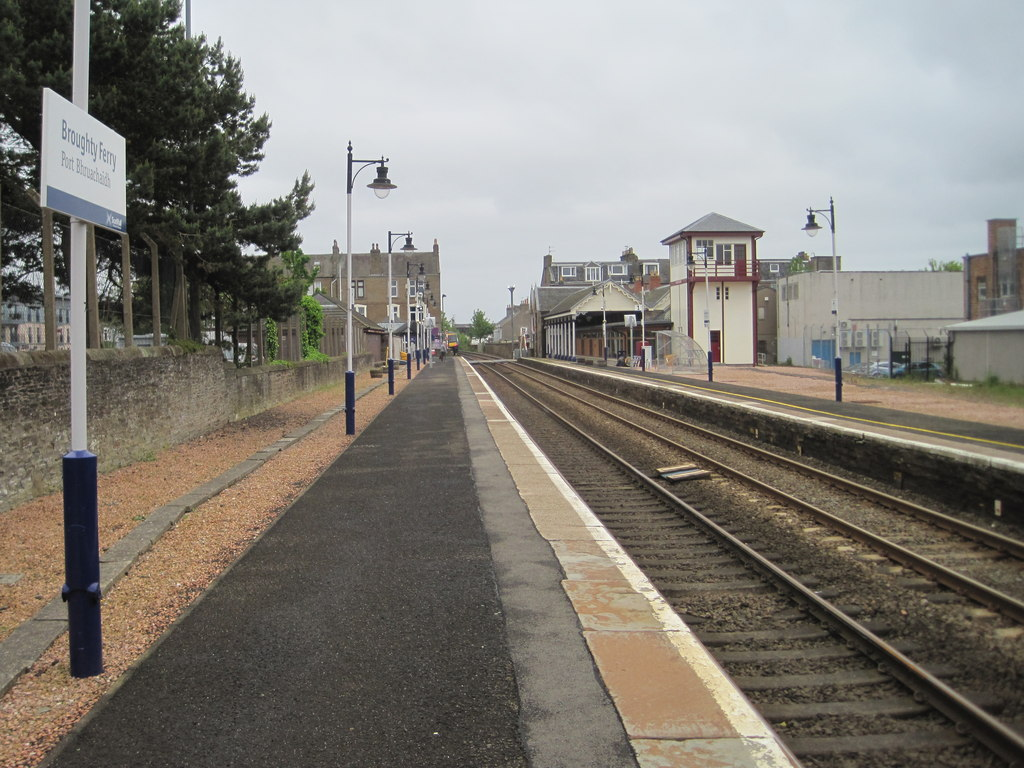
The station seen in 2014

The station is unstaffed, with benches and help points available on both platforms, plus a payphone and cycle racks on platform 1, although a shelter is available on platform 2. Step-free access is available to both platforms from the main road, but both platforms are also joined via the subway. As there are no facilities to purchase tickets, passengers must buy one in advance, or from the guard on the train. Network Rail, in 2025, said that the level crossing at the station had the largest number of misuse incidents across Scotland.

In November 2026, Network Rail lodged an application with Dundee City Council to extend the Dundee-bound platform by more than 30 metres at its western end.

== Passenger volume ==
In recent years, passenger usage has grown phenomenally, from under 10,000 in 2011–12 to over 90,000 in 2019–20, including a 24,000 rise between 2018–19 and 2019–20. 15 years earlier, usage hovered around 5,000 passengers per year.

Passenger Volume at Broughty Ferry
| | 2004–05 | 2005–06 | 2006–07 | 2007–08 | 2008–09 | 2009–10 | 2010–11 | 2011–12 | 2012–13 | 2013–14 | 2014–15 | 2015–16 | 2016–17 | 2017–18 | 2018–19 | 2019–20 | 2020–21 | 2021–22 | 2022–23 | 2023–24 | 2024–25 |
|---|---|---|---|---|---|---|---|---|---|---|---|---|---|---|---|---|---|---|---|---|---|
| Entries and exits | 4,943 | 4,996 | 6,271 | 6,277 | 5,918 | 5,570 | 5,362 | 9,288 | 23,180 | 34,970 | 41,246 | 43,276 | 40,718 | 43,330 | 57,454 | 91,678 | 21,720 | 76,182 | 84,268 | 124,272 | 148,586 |

The statistics cover twelve month periods that start in April.

== Services ==
Service frequencies at the station have varied significantly over the years - prior to 1990, there were regular local trains to Arbroath and Dundee or Perth throughout the day along with a small number of longer-distance workings. For the next twenty years, only a handful of trains (4 per day each way on average) stopped here, but since then there has a gradual increase in provision following a campaign by the local authority & rail user groups (for example, eight additional stops were added in December 2011).

As of May 2026, on weekdays and Saturdays there is an hourly service in each direction, to Dundee westbound (with one extended to Glasgow and one to Perth), and eastbound to Arbroath (with one extended to Aberdeen, one to Inverurie and one to Inverness). On Sundays, there are only 3 northbound services to Aberdeen and 4 southbound services: two to Edinburgh, one to Glasgow Queen Street and one to Perth.

| Preceding station | National Rail | Following station |
|---|---|---|
| Dundee | ScotRail; Dundee–Aberdeen line | Balmossie |
| | Historical railways | |
| West Ferry; Line open: Station closed | Dundee and Arbroath Railway | Monifieth; Line and Station open |
| West Ferry; Line open: Station closed | Dundee and Arbroath Railway; Broughty Ferry Pier Branch | Broughty Ferry Pier; Line and Station closed |
| West Ferry; Line open: Station closed | Caledonian Railway; Dundee and Forfar Direct Line | Barnhill; Line and Station closed |

== Bibliography ==
- Quick, Michael (2022). Railway Passenger Stations in Great Britain: A Chronology (PDF) (5th ed.). London: Railway and Canal Historical Society. Archived from the original (PDF) on 15 March 2023.
