= Elliot Junction railway station =

Disused railway station in Elliot, Angus

Elliot Junction
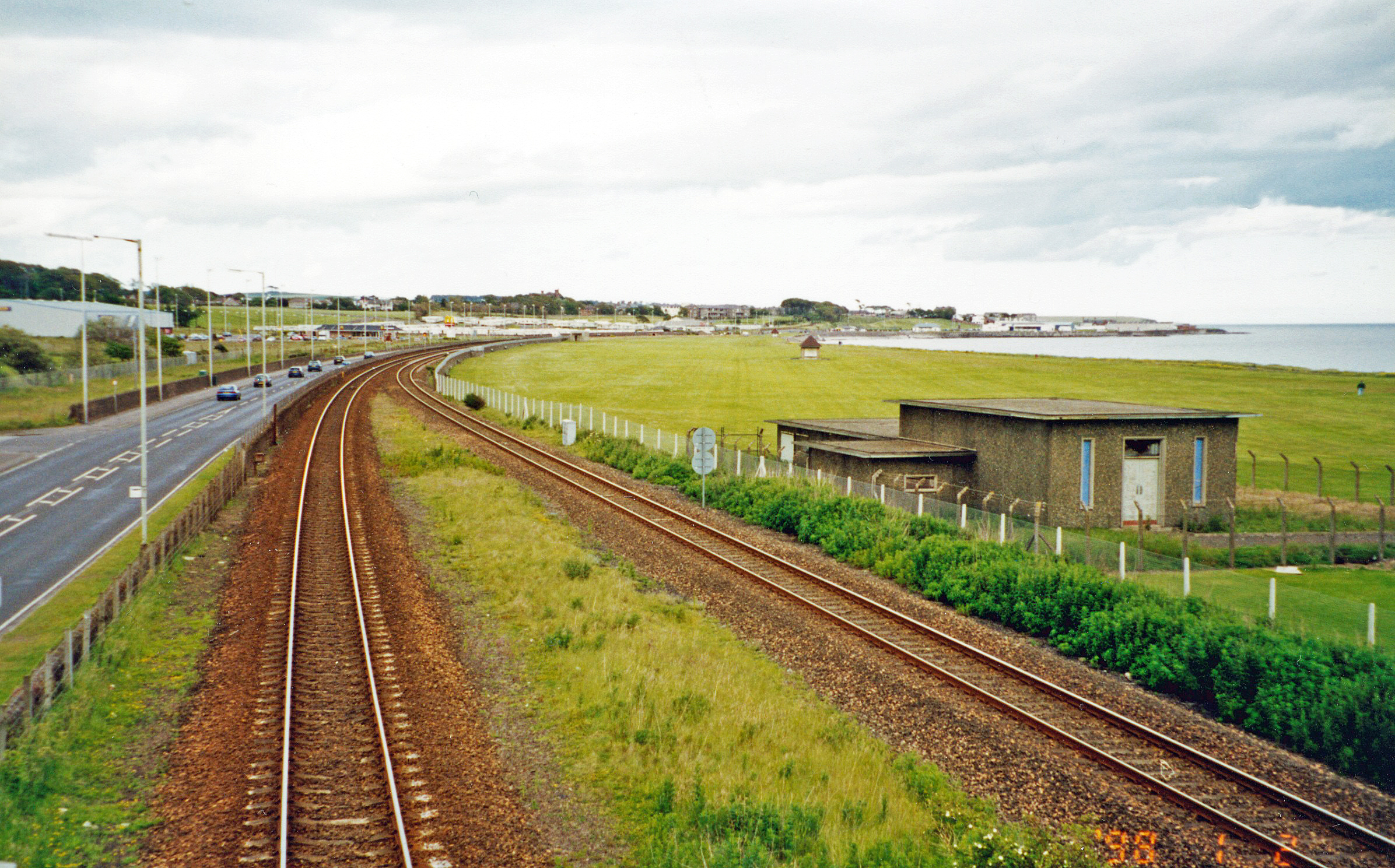
- The site of the station, looking northeast towards Arbroath, in 2002

General information
- Location: Elliot, Angus; Scotland
- Coordinates: 56.5458°N 2.6182°W
- Grid reference: NO620394
- Platforms: 1

Other information
- Status: Disused

History
- Original company: Caledonian Railway
- Pre-grouping: Dundee and Arbroath Railway
- Post-grouping: Dundee and Arbroath Railway

Key dates
- October 1866: Opened
- 1 January 1917: Closed
- 1 January 1918: Reopened
- 4 September 1967: Closed
Location

Elliot Junction railway station served the hamlet of Elliot, Angus, Scotland from 1866 to 1967 on the Dundee and Arbroath Railway.

== History ==
The station was opened in October 1866 by the Caledonian Railway. Elliot goods was nearby and there was a loop just after the level crossing. An accident occurred on 28 December 1906 when a train stood at the station was hit by another train. 22 people were killed and 8 were injured. The station closed on 1 January 1917 but reopened in September 1917, although it was only open on Saturdays. It fully reopened on 1 January 1918, before permanently closing on 4 September 1967.

Preceding station	Historical railways	Following station
Arbroath; Line and station open	Dundee and Arbroath Railway	Easthaven; Line open, station closed
