= Elliot Water =

River in Angus, Scotland

Location
- Country: Scotland
- Counties: Angus, Scotland
- Towns/Cities: Carmyllie, Arbirlot, Elliot, Arbroath

Physical characteristics
- Source
  - location: Carmyllie, Angus, Scotland
  - coordinates: 56.585026°N 2.783126°W
  - elevation: 700 ft (210 m)
- Mouth: North Sea
  - location: Elliot, Arbroath, UK
  - coordinates: 56.541447°N 2.621174°W
  - elevation: 0 m (0 ft)
- Length: 12 km (7.5 mi)
- Discharge
  - location: Elliot

Basin features
- Tributaries
  - left: Rottenraw Burn

The Elliot Water is a minor river in Angus, Scotland. The Elliot rises near West Hills in Carmyllie and flows through the parish and village of Arbirlot before reaching the North Sea at Elliot, on the west side of Arbroath. The total length is around 7½ miles or 12 km.

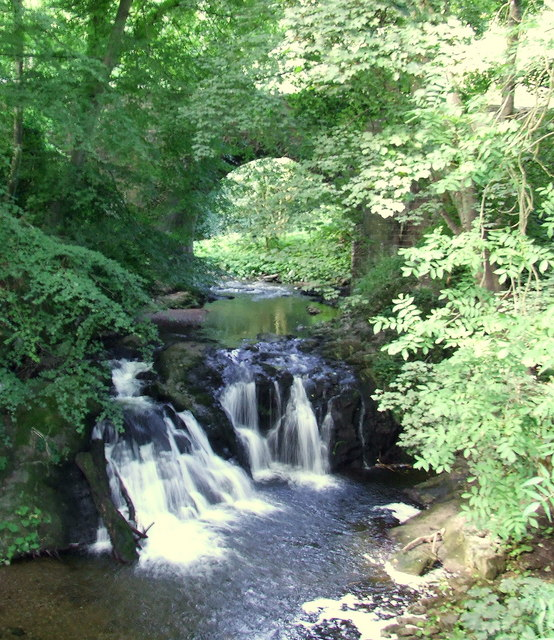
Falls and bridge at Arbirlot

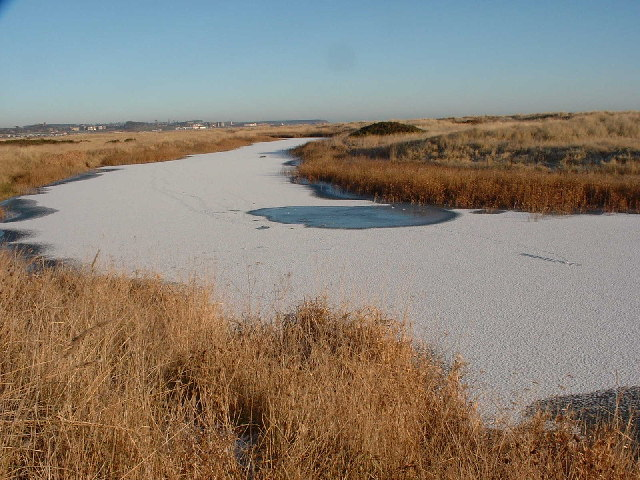
Elliot Water near North Sea outfall

The Elliot has been designated as a "freshwater fish protected area" by the Scottish Environment Protection Agency.
