= Carmyllie Railway =

Partly disused railway line in Scotland

Overview
- Status: partly disused
- Owner: The Marquess of Dalhousie (1855-1865); Scottish North-Eastern Railway (1865); Caledonian Railway (1866-1880); joint by Caledonian and North British Railway (1880-1923); joint by LMS and LNER (1923-1948); British Railways (1948-1965)
- Locale: Scotland
- Termini: Arbroath; Carmyllie quarries

History
- Opened: 1855
- Closed: 1965

The Carmyllie Railway was built in 1855 to enable transport of stone products from the Carmyllie area of Scotland to markets. At the time the stone was highly sought after for the urban development in progress.

The 6.5 miles (10.5 km) line ran to the main line of the Dundee and Arbroath Railway at Elliot Junction railway station.

In 1900 a passenger service was initiated on the line under the terms of Light Railway legislation. It was the first such in Scotland. However it was unsuccessful and ended in 1929.

The line closed completely in May 1965 except for a stub at Elliot which continued to serve a private siding until it too closed in 1984.

== History ==
=== Arbroath pavement ===
In the nineteenth century, urban development in Scotland proceeded at great speed, and there was considerable demand for construction materials. The sedimentary rocks located around Arbroath were exceptionally suited to roofing slates and paving slabs, being easily worked into flat sheets, and this product became known as Arbroath pavement. The most important quarry for extraction of the material was around the village of Carmyllie, a settlement located in high ground about 6 miles (8 km) west of Arbroath. With the exception of certain turnpike roads, the roadways in the area were very poor, and transport to market by horse and cart to Arbroath (for onward coastwise shipping) was difficult. The General Report of 1814 stated:

The quarries of Carmyllie, near Arbroath, are famous for paving freestone, and are the most esteemed in Scotland. The stones are easily quarried; of various thicknesses; large dimensions; and so smooth, that they require little dressing, yet are hard and durable. These advantages, however, are lessened by the tedious land carriage to the port of shipping (Arbroath), distant seven miles, and without a railway.

=== A railway connection ===
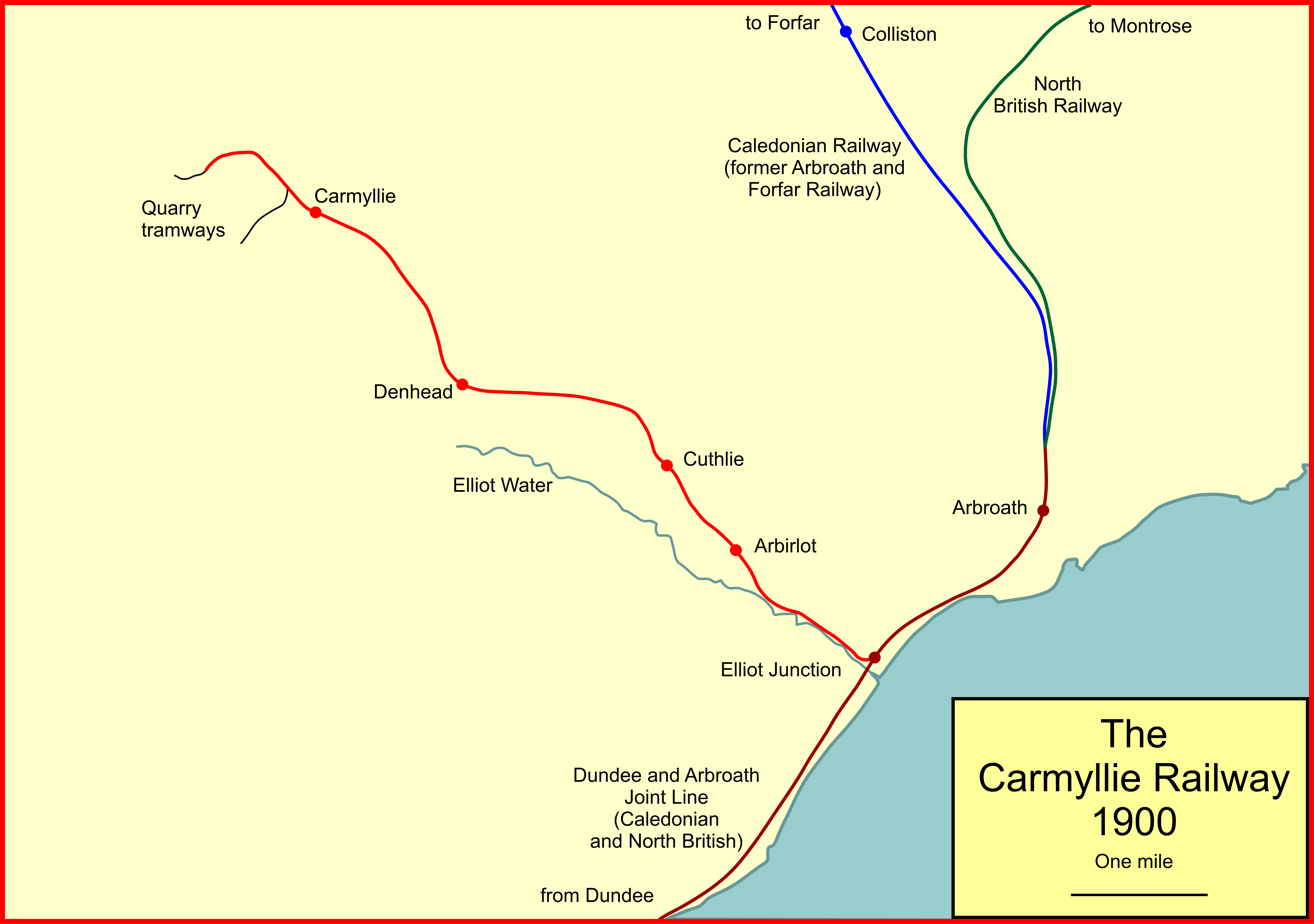
The Carmyllie Railway on the start of passenger operation

In 1839 the Dundee and Arbroath Railway (D&AR) opened its line, giving access to Arbroath harbour, but the line was remote from the quarries, and was of no use in transporting the stone.

The Marquess of Dalhousie was the principal landlord in the area, and he determined to improve the situation by building a railway branch line to the D&AR at Elliot. The route was fairly easy, descending with the Elliot Water. Dalhousie had no opposition to his scheme and did not seek an act of Parliament. (Note: Railscot says he obtained one in 1855 but this is not supported in other references, and may be confusion with the SNER purchase of 1865.) The line probably opened at the end of January 1855 It was a private mineral railway, and was probably (Note: Because the intended opening was reported at D&AR meeting) worked by the D&AR.

This had a considerable effect on the volume of the trade, and by 1864 Bremner wrote (using the spelling Carmylie):

The Carmylie Quarries ... are the most extensive in the country. They are situated six miles from Arbroath in the parish of Carmylie which forms part of the south eastern breast of the Sidlaw Hills and consists chiefly of a series of high grounds scarcely approaching to hills with their intervening valleys running from south west to east The quarries belong to the Earl of Dalhousie and are at present leased by Messrs Duncan Falconer & Co They have been worked for several centuries all over the parish.

Earlier farmers had quarried stone on their own land and carted the stone to Arbroath in their milk carts; but about 1804 the

quarries began to be worked on a more extensive scale. Windmills with movable wooden frames were erected for the purpose of pumping the water ... The machinery employed at that time consisted of a small single power crane which with care might be made to lift a stone a ton in weight. The present state of things at Carmylie is much different from what it was even twenty or thirty years ago. There are about 300 men in constant employment at the place. The machinery consists of eight planing machines, several cutting machines, eight saws for jointing pavement, one machine for making steps, coping and tabling; two polishing machines, six steam engines and from twelve to fourteen steam and other cranes ... The weight of stones sent away from the Carmylie Quarries daily is about 150 tons. A single line of railway extends from the quarries - the rails going to the bottom - to Elliot Junction near Arbroath a distance of five miles. The Carmylie Railway as it is called passes near the village of Arbirlot and skirts the beautiful Kelly Den which is of so much interest to the geologist. The line was constructed by the Earl of Dalhousie who sold it some years ago to the Caledonian Railway Company. It is used exclusively for the carriage of paving and other stones from the Carmylie Quarries.

=== Locomotives ===
From 1858 to 1865 the line operated a 0-4-0ST manufactured in 1858 at the Neilson & Co foundry. SNER No: 32.

=== Sale to the SNER ===
Scottish North-eastern (Purchase of Carmyllie Railway) Act 1865
- Act of Parliament
- Parliament of the United Kingdom
- Long title: An Act to vest the Carmyllie private Railway in the Scottish North-eastern Railway Company; Powers to that Company to take Tolls; raise additional Capital; and for other Purposes.
- Citation: 28 & 29 Vict. c. lxxxiii

Dates
- Royal assent: 19 June 1865

Text of statute as originally enacted

The Scottish North Eastern Railway (SNER) purchased the line from the Marquess of Dalhousie in 1865, under the terms of the Scottish North-eastern (Purchase of Carmyllie Railway) Act 1865 (28 & 29 Vict. c. lxxxiii).

The SNER itself was absorbed by the Caledonian Railway on 10 August 1866.

=== Joint ownership ===
The Caledonian saw its future as the controller of a large railway network throughout much of Scotland, and it engaged in continuing absorptions of smaller concerns. Parliament began to take the view that this was anti-competitive and granted running powers to the rival North British Railway (NBR) over much of the northern part of the Caledonian Railway system. The NBR opened the Tay bridge in 1878, giving it direct access to the north shore of the Firth of Tay. Its objective was to reach Aberdeen, and it requested the transfer of the Dundee and Arbroath line to joint ownership (between the Caledonian Railway and the NBR). At Arbroath the NBR had built its own line from there to Montrose and northwards.

The transfer took place by the North British Railway, Dundee and Arbroath Joint Line Act 1879 (42 & 43 Vict. c. clv) of 21 July 1879, and was effective from 1 February 1880.

=== Passengers ===
The railway had been conceived for the transport of minerals down to the coast. Over the years agricultural products and household materials had been carried in ordinary goods trains also.

The government had wished to encourage the provision of rail passenger services in remote areas without the heavy costs of main line operating controls, and the Light Railways Act 1896 was passed. A Board of Trade certificate was required without the expense of an individual act of Parliament, and with (unspecified in legislation) relaxations of operational procedures.

The branch line obtained authorisation to operate as a light railway in the Carmyllie Light Railway Order 1898, and the first passenger trains ran on 1 February 1900.

Geraldine Mitton states that this was the first such operation in Scotland:

From Arbroath a light railway runs (7 miles) up country to the village of Carmyllie, 600 feet above the sea, famous for its quarries of "Arbroath pavement." This, the first light railway in Scotland, was opened for passenger traffic on 1st Feb. 1900.

During World War I many railways suspended passenger operation in marginal areas because of the shortage of manpower, and the passenger service on the Carmyllie branch was temporarily withdrawn in January 1917; it was reinstated in September 1917, Saturdays only, and daily from 1 January 1918.

Typical passenger services in 1922 consisted of two round trips per day between Arbroath and Carmyllie, one in the morning and one in the evening, with journey times between 31 and 46 minutes.

The passenger service to the very small communities was lightly used, and on 2 December 1929 it was finally withdrawn. Passenger services were now withdrawn.

=== Grouping and nationalisation ===
In 1923 the main line railways of Great Britain were "grouped" by the terms of the Railways Act 1921; the Caledonian Railway was a constituent of the new London Midland and Scottish Railway (LMS) and the North British Railway was a constituent of the new London and North Eastern Railway (LNER). As the line had been jointly owned and operated, it officially retained joint status under the LMS and LNER. In 1948 the railways were nationalised, and the line moved to the control of British Railways, Scottish Region.

=== Elliot private siding ===
In the early 1960s the Metal Box company established a new factory at Elliot, on the north side of the line and of the main road (A92). A private siding connection was installed off the Carmyllie branch, facing Carmyllie and requiring a backshunt off the main line.

=== Closure ===
With the growth of efficient road transport, the residual goods service on the line also declined substantially, and the line closed on 19 May 1965, when LMS Ivatt Class 2 2-6-0 No. 46464 operated a service train to collect furnishings and effects from along the length of the route. The Metal Box factory private siding continued in use, served by a stub of the branch line, until 1984.

=== Subsequent use ===
Sections of the route between the former Elliot Junction station and Arbirlot have become a nature walk. The site of Elliot Junction station remains part of the operational railway between Dundee and Aberdeen, with the outline of the central island platform visible between the two running lines.

== Topography ==
The line was steeply graded, typically at 1 in 36 falling from Carmyllie.

Passenger services operated from 1 February 1900 and closed on 2 December 1929. The service was suspended on 1 January 1917; it was back in the timetable in September 1917, Saturdays only; daily from 1 January 1918.

- Carmyllie;
- Denhead;
- Cuthlie;
- Arbirlot;
- Elliot Junction Light Railway Platform; used by Carmyllie branch trains if platform in main line station was not available;
- Elliot Junction; station on Dundee and Arbroath main line; closed 1 January 1917; back in timetable September 1917, Saturdays only; from 1 January 1918 served every day by branch trains, which started from Arbroath; main line trains resumed calls from 1 February 1919; the station was known as Elliot and Kellyfield Junction at one time.
