= Dundee and Arbroath Railway =

Early railway in Scotland

Overview
- Locale: Scotland
- Dates of operation: October 1838–1 February 1880
- Successor: Caledonian Railway and North British Railway joint line

Technical
- Track gauge: 1,435 mm (4 ft 8 1/2 in) standard gauge
- Previous gauge: 5 ft 6 in (1,676 mm) (changed in 1848)
- Length: 16 3/4 miles (27.0 km)

The Dundee and Arbroath Railway was an early railway in Scotland. It opened in 1838, and used the unusual track gauge of 5 ft 6 in (1,676 mm). In 1848 it changed to standard gauge and connected to the emerging Scottish railway network.

It was absorbed by the larger Caledonian Railway, but when the North British Railway completed the construction of the Tay Bridge in 1878, it was granted part ownership of the line to enable it to form its main line to Aberdeen, so the line became the Dundee and Arbroath Joint Line.

The main line is in use at the present day (except for the terminals at each end) as part of the Dundee to Aberdeen main line.

== History ==
=== A scheme agreed ===
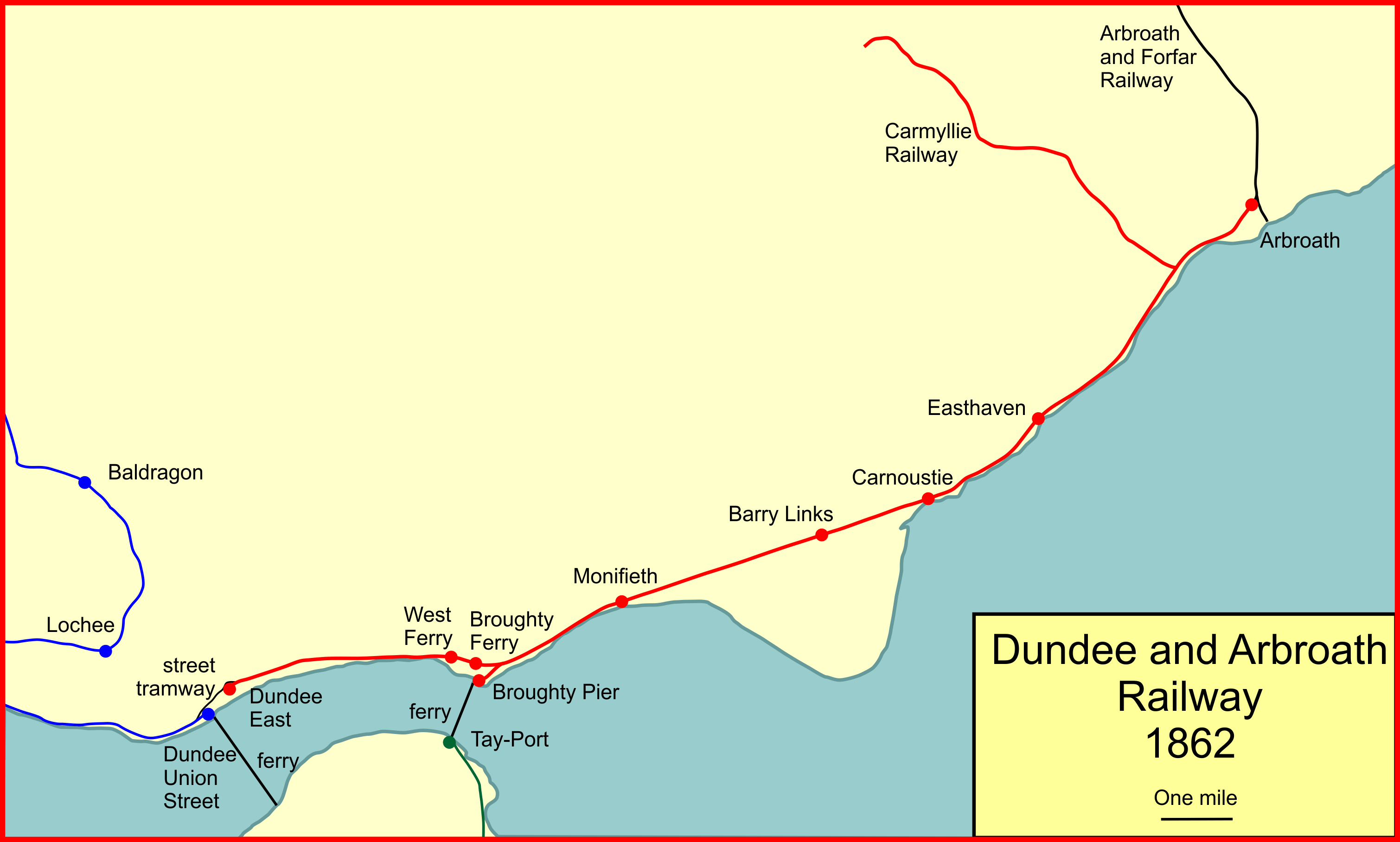
System map of the Dundee and Arbroath Railway

Dundee had for centuries been a centre of trade on the Firth of Tay, but Arbroath too was an important port and manufacturing centre. The turnpike road and coastal shipping were both in heavy use connecting the two places. A railway had been proposed in 1826, but not proceeded with.

In 1831 an inland-facing line had been opened; it was the Dundee and Newtyle Railway, designed to connect the port with the fertile agricultural area of Strathmore. As it had challenging terrain to traverse, crossing the range of the Sidlaw Hills, it had been built with three steep inclines worked by stationary steam engines. Its financial performance, like its operational performance, had been disappointing.

Now in 1834 George Matthewson was asked to survey the possible route of such a line. He found that a line was feasible and his calculations suggested a return of 8 to 10% on capital. This was reported locally in the press, and generated considerable enthusiasm. A public meeting was held on 12 October 1835, and it was agreed to prepare a Parliamentary Bill; Grainger and Miller were asked to execute the full survey required for the purpose. Three weeks later John Miller presented his survey and findings; the line could be built for £85,000 including land acquisition and rolling stock, and would return 7.5%. £94,000 was subscribed immediately at the meeting, and the subscription list was increased to £100,000 to mollify those intending investors who had not been able to subscribe at the meeting itself.

=== Authorisation ===
Dundee and Arbroath Railway Act 1836
- Act of Parliament
- Parliament of the United Kingdom
- Long title: An Act for making and maintaining a Railway from the Royal Burgh of Dundee in the County of Forfar to the Royal Burgh of Arbroath in the same County.
- Citation: 6 & 7 Will. 4. c. xxxii

Dates
- Royal assent: 19 May 1836

Text of statute as originally enacted

The bill was presented to the 1836 session of Parliament, and passed as the Dundee and Arbroath Railway Act 1836 (6 & 7 Will. 4. c. xxxii) on 19 May 1836: the Dundee and Arbroath Railway was incorporated, with capital of £100,000. On the same day another Arbroath line got its act of Parliament, the Arbroath and Forfar Railway Act 1836 (6 & 7 Will. 4. c. xxxiv): the Arbroath and Forfar Railway had been engineered by Miller's senior partner, Thomas Grainger. Lord Panmure had been energetic in promoting the railway and now, as chairman, he generously granted much of the necessary land for the line at a nominal rent, keeping the cost of the line low.

Grainger and Miller settled on the track gauge of 5 ft 6in (1,676 mm). They did not conceive of the likelihood of interoperability with other lines (although the A&FR was considered a partner of the Dundee and Arbroath and was to use the same gauge), and selected the gauge as a compromise between the (English) standard gauge and the broad gauge of Isambard Kingdom Brunel. (Note: The nearby Dundee and Newtyle Railway used a different gauge, 4ft 6.5in (1,384 mm).) The line was to run close to the coast between the two termini, but a branch was authorised to Almericloss, (Note: There are several alternate spellings of the location.) an area close to the A&FR station where it was expected that there would be an interchange depot. The main Arbroath terminal was to be at Lady Loan, on the sea front and a little short of the harbour. At Dundee the station was to be at Trades Lane, close to the expanded dock complex then under construction.

=== Construction and opening ===
The main line of the railway was almost level, and construction proceeded well enough; however at this early date contractors were not well equipped to handle large contracts and some of them experienced difficulties with cash flow: in July 1837 more than half the contractors for the construction of the line were bankrupt from this cause. The permanent way was 48 lbs/yard parallel rails held in chairs on stone blocks. By October 1838 the majority of the line was ready for a ceremonial opening, held on 6 October. The line was open from Lady Loan in Arbroath to Craigie Crossing, about two miles (3 km) short of Dundee. The Almericloss branch at Arbroath had been forgotten for the time being.

The public opening of the line took place on 9 October 1838. The cost overrun was 74.4%.

Dundee and Arbroath Railway Act 1842
- Act of Parliament
- Parliament of the United Kingdom
- Long title: An Act for enabling the Dundee and Arbroath Railway Company to raise a further Sum of Money, and to amend the Provisions of the Act relating to the said Railway.
- Citation: 5 & 6 Vict. c. lxxxiii

Dates
- Royal assent: 18 June 1842

Text of statute as originally enacted

The reason for the opening stopping short of Dundee itself now emerged: the westward progress of construction took the line directly to the water's edge, and the uncertain ground there required a causeway; in the final approach to Dundee the line passed across the frontage of industrial premises, severing their access to the river. After some delay the railway came to an amicable agreement with the proprietors, which seems to have involved paying them to relocate their works to the river side of the new line. The area in question was known as the Carolina Port (near the present-day Market Street). From there the Dundee Harbour Trustees had secured control of the railway's planned construction: the harbour was being greatly extended at the time. This section was built under their supervision, and was known as the Trades Lane and Carolina Port Railway owned by them; it was leased to the Dundee and Arbroath Railway but remained the property of the Dundee Harbour Trustees until 1907.

The causeway was constructed, and the railway was opened westward to a temporary "Dundee" terminus at Roodyards (close to the present Roodyards Road); this opening took place on 3 June 1839. Ten months later the final extension took place, to the Trades Lane terminus: the station was in the angle between the present day Marketgait and Camperdown Street. It opened on 1 April 1840. The building was said to be very basic and primitive.

The initial passenger train service was two return trips daily augmented by a third on Wednesday, Friday and Saturday. Passenger revenue exceeded expectations and soon climbed to 66% of income (by 1843).

The line was single track but right hand running applied at passing places, until the regauging of 1847.

=== Locomotives ===
The locomotives at first were named Wallace, Griffin, Fury and Rapid; they had the 2-2-2 wheel arrangement with 13 inch cylinders and an 18-inch stroke. Whishaw says "the steam is not allowed to blow off to waste, but is admitted to the tank of [the] tender, to raise the temperature of the water." The average velocity (he says) "is about 21 miles an hour; but in parts of the journey it is considerably above 30 miles an hour."

Dundee and Arbroath Railway Locomotives 1838–1862
Name	Wheel Arrangement	Foundry	Built	Acquired	Notes
Wallace	2-2-2	Kinmond H & Steel	1838		Withdrawn 1847
Fury	2-2-2	Kinmond H & Steel	1838		Withdrawn 1847
Griffen	2-2-2	Kinmond H & Steel	1839		Withdrawn 1847
Rapid	2-2-2	Kinmond H & Steel	1840		Sold 1847 Dundee & Perth & Aberdeen Junction Railway No: 8
Dart	2-2-2	Kinmond H & Steel	1840		Withdrawn 1859
Queen	2-2-2	Kinmond H & Steel	1841		Withdrawn 1859
Caledonia	0-4-0	Kinmond & Co	1847		SNER No: 38
Gowrie	0-4-0	Kinmond & Co	1848		SNER No: 39
Craigie	0-4-2	Kinmond & Co	1849		SNER No: 36
Carlogie	0-4-2	Kinmond & Co	1849		SNER No: 37
	2-2-2	Kinmond & Co?	c1852		SNER No: 19
	2-2-2	Kinmond & Co?	c1852		SNER No: 20
	2-2-2	Kinmond & Co?	c1852		SNER No: 21
No 3	2-2-2	Greenock	1846	1859	ex Glasgow Paisley & Greenock Railway No 18, ex Caledonian Railway No 2, SNER No: 12, scrapped 1866
No 4	2-2-2	Vulcan Foundry	1847	1859	ex Caledonian Railway No: 16, SNER No: 13

=== Part of a Scottish network ===
The line had been planned for purely local transits, with only a possible link with the Arbroath and Forfar line in mind. In the years following the opening of the line, the notion of a railway network in Scotland gathered support; such a network was already forming in England, and controversy was seen everywhere in the press over a route from central Scotland to England; which route would be practicable? That discussion lent further weight to ideas of trunk railways in Scotland, and the availability of cheap money led to a frenzy of railway promotions. In the 1845 parliamentary session, the Caledonian Railway was authorised, capital £1.5 million, to build from Edinburgh and Glasgow to Carlisle, there joining the English system; but in addition the Scottish Central Railway (Castlecary to Perth), the Scottish Midland Junction Railway (Perth to Forfar), the Aberdeen Railway (Forfar to Aberdeen) and the Dundee and Perth Railway were all authorised on the same day, 31 August 1845.

Dundee and Arbroath Railway Act 1846
- Act of Parliament
- Parliament of the United Kingdom
- Long title: An Act to enable the Dundee and Arbroath Railway Company to make a Railway from their Line at Broughty to Broughty Ferry Castle, and another Railway from their Line at Geordies Burn to the Arbroath and Forfar Railway at Almerieclose.
- Citation: 9 & 10 Vict. c. cxxxiii

Dates
- Royal assent: 3 July 1846

Alliances had already been forged between several of them: the Caledonian Railway in particular saw itself as the controller of a large network throughout much of Scotland. The Caledonian board approved a lease of the D&AR at 8% annual charge, although this was repudiate later. All these lines were going to be made on the standard gauge, and suddenly the two Arbroath lines saw that their unique gauge was a major disadvantage. The directors of the newly authorised Dundee and Perth line met with the Dundee and Arbroath and the Arbroath and Forfar directors in London on 19 May 1845; it was agreed that the two Arbroath lines would convert their track gauge, and make the connection to Almericloss that had been authorised originally; and that they would encourage the Aberdeen Railway to form a connection making a line from Dundee to Aberdeen. This required an authorising act of Parliament, and the Dundee and Arbroath Railway Act 1846 (9 & 10 Vict. c. cxxxiii) was passed on 3 July 1846. As well as the gauge change and the Almericloss line, this authorised a branch at Broughty Ferry to the harbour.

There was (of course) a ferry there, (Note: A passenger ferry; the community had been known as Broughty Ferry since at least 1826.) and the Dundee and Arbroath had a station nearby, but not immediately at the ferry pier. The Edinburgh and Northern Railway was building a line from Burntisland to Ferryport-on-Craig, on the Fife side of the Tay, and to Perth. The E&NR would be making possible journeys from Edinburgh to Dundee (by two ferry crossings, of the Forth and the Tay) and was known to be considering expansion on the north side of the Tay. The Broughty Ferry branch was intended to forestall an unwelcome incursion by the E&NR. The gauge change meant that considerable sums of money were required, as rolling stock needed to be converted or acquired as well.

The Arbroath connecting line and the gauge change were completed on 23 December 1847, and the Broughty Ferry branch was opened in May 1848. It made a triangular junction with the main line, occupying the alignment of the present-day St Vincent Street, but on 1 May 1851 it was replaced with a single connection in a more easterly position, facing Arbroath only, and requiring a reversal for trains to Dundee.

In July or August 1847 the street running connection between the Dundee and Arbroath and the Dundee and Perth line was opened. From 1851 to 1907 it was leased to the D&AR by the harbour commissioners who owned it; only horse traction was allowed on it.

=== Proposals to lease to the Dundee and Perth and make a cross-Dundee line ===
By this time the company was trading successfully, but considerations of the wider railway network led it to agree to lease its line to the Dundee and Perth Railway, this to take effect on 30 April 1847. The D&PR would have a terminus at the west end of the city, and the D&AR terminus was at the east end. The arrangement was to include a new line linking the routes by a high level line sweeping round the north of the city.

Dundee and Arbroath Railway (Dundee Junction) Act 1848
- Act of Parliament
- Parliament of the United Kingdom
- Long title: An Act to enable the Dundee and Arbroath Railway Company to make a Junction Line of Railway into the Royal Burgh of Dundee.
- Citation: 11 & 12 Vict. c. cxxix

Dates
- Royal assent: 14 August 1848

Text of statute as originally enacted

Dundee and Arbroath Railway Lease Act 1848
- Act of Parliament
- Parliament of the United Kingdom
- Long title: An Act to enable the Dundee and Perth Railway Company to take a Lease of the Undertaking of the Dundee and Arbroath Railway Company, and to amend the Acts relating to such Companies respectively.
- Citation: 11 & 12 Vict. c. cliv

Dates
- Royal assent: 31 August 1848

Text of statute as originally enacted

The proposal was authorised by the Dundee and Perth Railway (Dundee Junction) Act 1848 (11 & 12 Vict. c. lii) and the Dundee and Arbroath Railway (Dundee Junction) Act 1848 (11 & 12 Vict. c. cxxix), although it had been strongly objected to by the Council of Dundee, and the Dundee and Arbroath Railway Lease Act 1848 (11 & 12 Vict. c. cliv) was obtained later in the same session (on 31 August 1848) authorising the lease and changing the name of the Dundee and Perth Railway to the Dundee and Perth and Aberdeen Railway Junction Company. However the lease was not put into effect, and the promised 8% lease charge was felt to be unsustainable in the changed financial climate. The two companies disengaged from 9 March 1850, authorised by the Dundee and Perth and Aberdeen Railway Junction (Additional Capital) Act 1850 (13 & 14 Vict. c. xxxix) of 15 July 1850.

And be it enacted, That the Railway and Works to be made under the Authority of this Act shall be the following; (that is to. say,) a Railway commencing by a Junction with the Main Line of the Dundee and Perth Railway at or near to the Sea Braes in the Parish of Dundee and terminating in the unembanked Area or Space of the Bed of the River Tay cut off from the said River by Dock Street of Dundee and the Dundee and Arbroath Railway and the Docks of Dundee, at or about Two hundred and ninety Yards Eastward from the Lane or Street called Trades Lane of Dundee, and at or about Fifty Yards Northward from Dock Street of Dundee in the Parish of Dundee, together with all proper Stations, Depôts, Sheds, Warehouses, and other Works and Conveniences connected therewith. — Section 12, Dundee and Perth Railway (Dundee Junction) Act 1848 (11 & 12 Vict. c. lii)

And be it enacted, That the Railway and Works to be made under the Authority of this Act shall be the following; (that is to say,) a Railway commencing by a Junction with the Main Line of the Dundee and Arbroath Railway at or near to the Lands of Craigie, and at or near to the Distance Posts upon the said Railway marked as One Mile and One Half Mile from the Dundee Station of the said Railway and Fifteen and One Quarter Miles from the Arbroath Station of the said Railway in the Parish of Dundee and County of Forfar, and terminating in the unembanked Area or Space of the Bed of the River Tay cut off from the said River by Dock Street of Dundee and the Dundee and Arbroath Railway and the Docks of Dundee, at or about Two hundred and ninety Yards Eastward from the Lane or Street called Trades Lane of Dundee, and at or about Fifty Yards Northward from Dock Street of Dundee, in the Parish of Dundee, together with all proper Stations, Depôts, Sheds, Warehouses, and other Works and Conveniences connected therewith. — Section 17, Dundee and Arbroath Railway (Dundee Junction) Act 1848 (11 & 12 Vict. c. cxxix)

=== The Carmyllie line ===
In June 1854 it was announced that an agreement had been finalised with The Marquess of Dalhousie to work a line he was proposing to build privately, from quarries at Carmyllie to Elliot. This opened in 1855 and became known as the Carmyllie Railway.

=== A better Dundee terminus ===
Dundee and Arbroath Railway (Dundee Station) Act 1851
- Act of Parliament
- Parliament of the United Kingdom
- Long title: An Act to enable the Dundee and Arbroath Railway Company to enlarge their present Terminal Station in Dundee, and to amend the Acts relating to the Company.
- Citation: 14 & 15 Vict. c. lxiii

Dates
- Royal assent: 3 July 1851

Text of statute as originally enacted

The Trades Lane terminal had long been criticised as inadequate, and in 1850 steps were taken to improve matters, with the required legal powers being obtained in the Dundee and Arbroath Railway (Dundee Station) Act 1851 (14 & 15 Vict. c. lxiii). Dock Street ran along the alignment of the present-day Camperdown Street, and was diverted northwards into its present-day position to allow for the larger station premises; the line to the original station had been extended to connect to the Dundee and Perth station; it ran through the streets and only horse drawn transfer movements were permitted, although these apparently included passenger movements. This was retained, and the new station joined the earlier alignment at Camperdown Junction (56°27′51″N 2°57′24″W), named after the adjacent dock basin.

The new station, Dock Street, was opened on 14 December 1857; it was renamed Dundee East in 1858, and the track in the old station was removed in January 1858.

=== The Scottish North Eastern Railway ===
The several independent railways in the area north of Falkirk had experienced changing allegiances, and at one time amalgamations had been frowned on by legislators. However, by an act of Parliament, the Scottish North Eastern Railway Act 1856 (19 & 20 Vict. c. cxxxiv), of 29 July 1856 the Scottish North Eastern Railway was formed, by merging the Aberdeen Railway and the Scottish Midland Junction Railway. This new company controlled the line from Perth and Arbroath to Aberdeen, and the Dundee and Arbroath line saw its future more positively in that group: it agreed to be vested in the SNER from 31 January 1862; this was ratified by an act of Parliament, the Scottish North Eastern Railway Act 1863 (26 & 27 Vict. c. ccxxxi), of 28 July 1863, bringing about the end of the independent existence of the Dundee and Arbroath Railway.

At this time the Dundee and Perth Railway had become part of the Scottish Central Railway (SCR); relations between the SNER and the SCR were not always harmonious, and the two lines were only connected at Dundee by the limited street running section. However, the SNER and the SCR were not to last long: they sold their lines to the Caledonian Railway, the SNER doing so by the Caledonian and Scottish North Eastern Railways Amalgamation Act 1866 (29 & 30 Vict. c. cccl), and the D&AR line went with it. Now the Caledonian Railway controlled the network north and east of Perth.

=== Dundee and Forfar direct line ===
The SNER had obtained an act of Parliament, the Scottish North Eastern Railway (Dundee and Forfar) Act 1864 (27 & 28 Vict. c. clxxii), for a direct line from Dundee to Forfar in 1864, but the work was not put in hand. After the Caledonian Railway took over the Scottish North Eastern Railway, it prepared plans for a different alignment, joining the Arbroath line at Broughty Ferry. The Dundee and Forfar Direct Line opened in 1871. It diverged from the D&A line at Broughty Ferry, leaving towards the south and climbing before turning north and crossing the main line, running through hilly and sparsely populated terrain to Forfar.

=== The North British Railway ===
The North British Railway was dominant in its network in Fife and had long aspired to cross the Firth of Tay by a bridge. Its trains already ran to Dundee, crossing the Tay by ferry (referred to as a "floating bridge") from Tay-Port to Broughty Ferry, from where they were "shunted into Dundee on a Caledonian branch", paying a charge of £10,000 annually for the privilege, which was much resented. Two trains a day ran to Aberdeen from Burntisland using the ferry and the D&AR, using their own locomotives.

During some arcane railway politics in 1866 the Caledonian had given an assurance that they would not oppose parliamentary proceedings for a Tay Bridge at Dundee, and would transfer the Dundee and Arbroath line to joint ownership. The NBR had previously made attempts to get authorisation for a bridge crossing and been rebuffed, but now in 1869 a definite proposal found widespread support. On 15 July 1870 the North British Railway (Tay Bridge and Railways) Act 1870 (33 & 34 Vict. c. cxxxv) was passed. Construction was not without its problems, but the bridge was formally opened on 31 May 1878.

On the Dundee side the bridge landed by Magdalen Green and curved east alongside the existing Dundee and Perth line; considerable land had been reclaimed from the Tay. There was a new through station near Craig Pier: the present day station, immediately to the south of the D&PR Dundee West terminus. The line continued in a cut-and-cover tunnel under Dock Street (now Marketgait) emerging at Camperdown junction, immediately east of the Dundee East terminus. At last Dundee had a through west to east railway, as well as the bridge to Fife.

On 28 December 1879 the bridge fell during an extremely strong storm, taking a train down with it. 74 or 75 persons lost their lives. The Broughty Ferry, which had been discontinued on the opening of the bridge, was resumed, and NBR trains for the train ferry now used the new Tay Bridge station. The NBR was anxious to provide a replacement bridge as soon as possible, and notwithstanding the financial and social difficulties, the new bridge was inaugurated on 20 June 1887.

=== The Dundee and Arbroath Joint Line ===
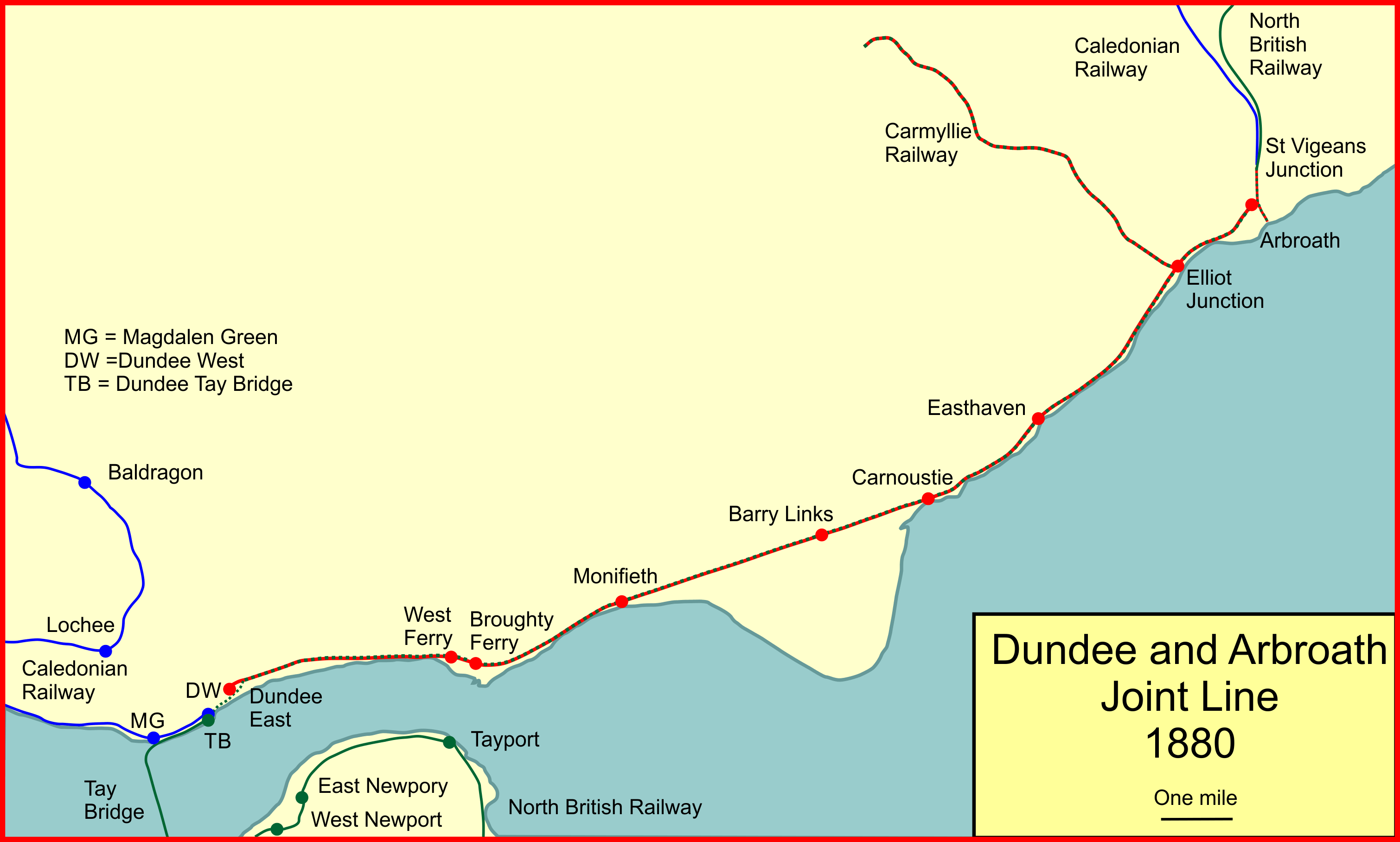
Dundee and Arbroath Joint Line in 1880

The NBR had planned for many years to extend to Aberdeen, and the Tay Bridge was only part of that plan. In 1871 it had been authorised to build a line from St Vigeans Junction (immediately north of Arbroath) to Kinnaber Junction, north of Montrose; this line was fully open by 1883.

North British Railway, Dundee and Arbroath Joint Line Act 1879
- Act of Parliament
- Parliament of the United Kingdom
- Long title: An Act to give to the North British Railway Company a joint interest with the Caledonian Railway Company in the Dundee and Arbroath Railway and part of the Arbroath and Forfar Railway; and for other purposes.
- Citation: 42 & 43 Vict. c. clv

Dates
- Royal assent: 21 July 1879

Text of statute as originally enacted

During the process of building the (first) Tay Bridge, the NBR had petitioned Parliament for the Dundee and Arbroath section (the former D&AR now owned by the Caledonian) to be transferred to joint ownership. When the SNER had been created in 1856 there had been concerns about monopolistic power of large railway companies, and Parliament was amenable to the change, which would enable the NBR to operate a service between Edinburgh and Aberdeen relatively independently. This transfer was mandated by the North British Railway, Dundee and Arbroath Joint Line Act 1879 (42 & 43 Vict. c. clv) of 21 July 1879, to take effect on 1 February 1880. (The Tay Bridge fell in the intervening period.)

The whole of the original Dundee and Arbroath line from Camperdown Junction to the Arbroath joint station was included, as well as the former A&FR section from there to St Vigeans Junction, the Carmyllie branch and the Arbroath Harbour branch. The Caledonian Railway received £171,566 in compensation, after arbitration by the Railway and Canal Commission. The NBR already had been granted running powers over the Aberdeen section of the Caledonian Railway, so it now had a viable route from Edinburgh to Aberdeen via Dundee and Montrose. In addition there had previously been working agreements for Dundee East station for goods and passenger purposes, and these continued. The train service was operated in alternate years by the two owning companies until 1929.

Proposals in the first years of the twentieth century to expand the track facilities around Dundee East were frustrated by obstruction from the Dundee Port Authority, who feared loss of business. However the ownership of the section closest to Dundee East was transferred to the joint line, when the Trades Lane and Carolina Port Railway became part of the joint line, by agreement of 20 November 1906, effective on 28 August 1907.

=== Grouping; and nationalisation ===
The Railways Act 1921 caused the main line railways of Great Britain to be "grouped" into one of four large concerns; the Caledonian Railway was a constituent of the new London Midland and Scottish Railway (LMS) and the North British Railway was a constituent of the new London and North Eastern Railway (LNER). This took effect on 1 January 1923. (Note: For practical purposes; delay in tidying up the administration caused the Caledonian to enter the LMS formally on 1 July 1923, but the Caledonian share of the Dundee and Arbroath Joint Line was schemed across to the LMS on 1 January.)

The train service pattern did not change fundamentally; residential traffic around Dundee had built up in the twentieth century and this continued.

On 1 January 1948 the railways were nationalised, and the main line railways of Scotland became part of British Railways Scottish Region. The train service pattern was not radically changed, although diesel multiple units were introduced on local services. The three terminal stations were retained for the time being.

The decline in local passenger use was a greater factor, and the Dundee and Forfar direct line closed to passengers on 8 January 1955. Dundee East station only handled local passenger trains and as this traffic declined, the requirement for the terminus fell away; it closed on 5 January 1959.

=== The Beeching report ===
In 1963 British Railways published a report, The Reshaping of British Railways, colloquially referred to as the Beeching Report. The railways had been accumulating increasing losses with little means of reducing them, and widespread closures and "rationalisation" were proposed. On 3 May 1965 Dundee West station was closed and all passenger services were concentrated on Tay Bridge station, which was renamed Dundee. The Tay road bridge opened in 1966.

The two routes from central Scotland to Aberdeen were deemed unsustainable and the Caledonian route through Strathmore was closed in 1967; all through trains to Aberdeen now travelled via Dundee and Arbroath on what is today the Dundee–Aberdeen line.

=== Dundee Harbour Lines ===
The Dundee Harbour lines were adjacent to Camperdown Junction; train operation on them was subject to bye-laws. From 1931 these included:

- Small and light locomotive engines, approved by the Harbour Engineer, shall be used in the conduct of traffic.
- Coke, or a mixture of coke and coal only (not more than fifty per cent coal), shall be used for such engines, the use of other fuel being prohibited. The engines shall not be allowed in the sheds except where rails are laid down for their passage.
- An iron grating, or other spark arrester ... shall at all times be kept on the funnel of each engine.
- There shall always accompany each locomotive or train two qualified pilotmen each wearing a red cap. One of the pilotmen shall walk in advance of the locomotive or train not more than 30 feet ahead of it, and the other shall walk by the side of the train.
- Steam whistling shall be practised only when absolutely necessary, and then with great caution, after a careful look-out.

== Current operations ==
The majority of the Dundee and Arbroath Joint Line remains in use, from Camperdown Junction at Dundee to St Vigeans Junction north of Arbroath. Dundee East station, the Broughty Ferry Pier branch, and Arbroath LadyLoan are closed, as is the Carmyllie branch. Domestic passenger services are operated by ScotRail, and a limited service between London and Aberdeen is operated by London North Eastern Railway. Long-distance passenger trains from other English destinations are operated by CrossCountry and a night sleeping car train to London is run by Caledonian Sleeper.

== Chronology ==
- Dundee Dock Street; opened 2 April 1840; soon renamed Dundee East; closed 5 January 1959;
- Dundee Trades Lane; opened 2 November 1839; closed 2 April 1840;
- Dundee Roodyards; opened 3 June 1839; closed on extension of line to Dock Street (or possibly retained for a short period);
- Stannergate; opened 1 February 1901; closed 1 May 1916;
- Craigie; opened 6 October 1838; closed on extension of line to Roodyards;
- West Ferry; opened 17 May 1848; closed 1 January 1917; reopened 1 February 1919; closed 4 September 1967;
- Broughty Ferry; opened 6 October 1838;
  - Broughty Ferry Pier; on branch line; opened 17 May 1848; closed 1 June 1878 on opening of the Tay Bridge; reopened on 1 February 1880 following its collapse; closed 20 June 1887;
- Balmossie; opened 18 June 1962;
- Monifieth; opened 6 October 1838;
- Barry Review Platform; private station for military use opened 1890; there were shooting ranges and later extensive campos on the moor adjacent; in 1895 named Barry Links Review Siding and in 1904 Barry Links Buddon Siding; in public timetables from July 1910; closed 1 September 1914; reopened during 1944 for military use; closed by 1957
- Barry; opened in September 1851; renamed Barry Links in 1919;
- Golf Street; opened 7 November 1960;
- Carnoustie; opened 6 October 1838; relocated east of level crossing 1900;
- East Haven; opened 6 October 1838; renamed Easthaven; closed 4 September 1967;
- Elliot Junction; trailing junction from Carmyllie Railway; opened October 1866; closed 1 January 1917; reopened September 1917 Saturday service only; from 1 January 1918 served by all trains on the Carmyllie branch; main line trains resumed calling from 1 February 1919; closed 4 September 1967;
- Arbroath; opened 6 October 1838 (as Arbroath Ladyloan); replaced by new station at Keptie 1 February 1848; replaced by permanent Joint Station 14 December 1858; later Arbroath.
