= List of shipwrecks in January 1836 =

The list of shipwrecks in January 1836 includes ships sunk, foundered, wrecked, grounded, or otherwise lost during January 1836.

== 1 January ==
List of shipwrecks: 1 January 1836
Ship	State	Description
Emancipation	United Kingdom	The ship ran aground on the Black Middens, in the North Sea off the coast of County Durham. She was later refloated and taken in to South Shields, County Durham.
Père de Famille	France	The ship was lost near Calais. Her crew were rescued. She was on a voyage from Portugal to Dunkirk, Nord.

== 2 January ==
List of shipwrecks: 2 January 1836
Ship	State	Description
Bride	United Kingdom	The ship was wrecked in the Atlantic Ocean with the loss of all but two of her fourteen crew. She was on a voyage from America to Hull, Yorkshire.

== 3 January ==
List of shipwrecks: 3 January 1836
Ship	State	Description
Cowper	United Kingdom	The ship was wrecked near Coulderton Point, Cumberland.
Deux Frères	France	The ship was driven ashore and damaged on the French coast. She was on a voyage from Nantes, Loire-Inférieure to Marseille, Bouches-du-Rhône Deux Frères was later refloated.
Fame	United Kingdom	The ship was driven ashore in Krage Bay. She was on a voyage from Riga, Russia to London. Fame was later refloated and resumed her voyage.
Jean Baptiste	France	The ship foundered off the mouth of the Somme. Her crew were rescued. She was on a voyage from Adra, Spain to Saint-Valery-sur-Somme.
Nimble	United Kingdom	The ship was driven ashore and wrecked at Stornoway, Isle of Lewis, Outer Hebrides. She was on a voyage from Newcastle upon Tyne to Liverpool, Lancashire.

== 4 January ==
List of shipwrecks: 4 January 1836
Ship	State	Description
Brilliant	United Kingdom	The ship was driven ashore and wrecked on Bermuda. She was on a voyage from British Honduras to London.
Clara	United Kingdom	The ship was abandoned in the Atlantic Ocean. Her crew were rescued by John Taylor (United Kingdom). Clara was on a voyage from Quebec City, Lower Canada, British North America to Bristol, Gloucestershire.
Dryades	United Kingdom	The ship struck a sandbank and foundered off Formby, Lancashire. Her crew were rescued. She was on a voyage from Pentowin, Carmarthenshire to Liverpool, Lancashire.
General Brock	United Kingdom	The ship was driven ashore on Bermuda.
George Canning	United Kingdom	The ship was wrecked at Calabar, Africa.
St. Domingo	United Kingdom	The ship foundered off Port Nessock, Wigtownshire. Her crew were rescued. She was on a voyage from Killough, County Down to Belfast, County Antrim.

=== 5 January ===
List of shipwrecks: 5 January 1836
Ship	State	Description
England	United Kingdom	The ship was abandoned in the Atlantic Ocean. Her crew were rescued by Blucher (United States). England was on a voyage from Quebec City, Lower Canada, British North America to the Clyde.
Louise and Auguste	Stettin	The ship was wrecked near Rügenwalde, Prussia with the loss of six of her crew. She was on a voyage from Laguna, Brazil to Stettin.

== 6 January ==
List of shipwrecks: 6 January 1836
Ship	State	Description
Danube	United States	The ship was destroyed by fire at Valparaíso, Chile.
Johannes	Netherlands	The ship was driven ashore on Gotland with some loss of life. She was on a voyage from Pori, Grand Duchy of Finland to Riga, Russia.
Rolla	United Kingdom	The ship was destroyed by fire in the Bonny River. Her crew were rescued.

== 7 January ==
List of shipwrecks: 7 January 1836
Ship	State	Description
Astros	United States	The ship was driven ashore and wrecked at Squan Beach, New Jersey. She was on a voyage from Trieste to New York.
Coriolanus	United Kingdom	The ship ran aground near the mouth of the Orinoco River. She was wrecked and abandoned on 29 January. Coriolanus was on a voyage from St. Thomas, Virgin Islands to Angostura, Venezuela.
Robert and William	United Kingdom	The ship ran aground on the Whitton Sand, in the North Sea and capsized. She was later refloated and put into Hull, Yorkshire for repairs.

== 8 January ==
List of shipwrecks: 8 January 1836
Ship	State	Description
George and Ann	United Kingdom	The ship was driven ashore at Saltfleet, Lincolnshire. Her crew were rescued. She was on a voyage from Odesa to Newcastle upon Tyne, Northumberland.
Jadul Karim	India	The ship was wrecked on a reef 25 nautical miles (46 km) off "Kangraes Island". She was on a voyage from Surabaya, Netherlands East Indies to Amboina, Spanish East Indies. Of her crew and 309 passengers, there were at least 63 survivors.
Kingston	United Kingdom	The ship foundered in the Atlantic Ocean off Cape Palmas, Liberia. Her crew were rescued. She was on a voyage from Liverpool, Lancashire to Africa.
Pauline	United Kingdom	The ship was wrecked on Egg Island, in the Bay of Cunha. She was on a voyage from Maranhão, Brazil to Havre de Grâce, Seine-Inférieure, France.

== 9 January ==
List of shipwrecks: 9 January 1836
Ship	State	Description
Hartlepool Packet	United Kingdom	The ship was driven ashore and wrecked at Sunderland, County Durham. Her crew were rescued.
Jamaica Packet	United Kingdom	The ship was driven ashore and wrecked near Malahide, County Dublin. Her crew were rescued. She was on a voyage from Whitehaven, Cumberland to Dublin.
Pandora	(United Kingdom of Great Britain and Ireland) New South Wales	The cutter was wrecked at Port Stephens with the loss of five lives. Seven survivors were rescued by Carrington ( (United Kingdom of Great Britain and Ireland) New South Wales).
Scotia	Prussia	The ship was wrecked on the Goodwin Sands, Kent, United Kingdom. Her crew were rescued. She was on a voyage from Memel to Liverpool, Lancashire, United Kingdom.
Traveller	United Kingdom	The ship sank at South Shields, County Durham.

== 10 January ==
List of shipwrecks: 10 January 1836
Ship	State	Description
Fanny	United Kingdom	The ship was driven ashore and wrecked at Hartlepool, County Durham. She was on a voyage from Stockton-on-Tees, County Durham to London.
John	United Kingdom	The ship was wrecked on the "Cosshalk Rocks". She was on a voyage from Saint Petersburg, Russian Empire to Boston, Lincolnshire.
Naopleon	United States	The ship foundered in the Atlantic Ocean off the coast of Delaware.

== 11 January ==
List of shipwrecks: 11 January 1836
Ship	State	Description
Mary	United Kingdom	The ship ran aground on the Arbetay Sands and was abandoned by her crew. She was later refloated and taken in to Dundee, Forfarshire.

== 12 January ==
List of shipwrecks: 12 January 1836
Ship	State	Description
Mary	United Kingdom	The ship was driven ashore near Skagen, Denmark. She was on a voyage from Riga, Russia to London. Mary was refloated on 19 January and taken in to Fredrikshavn, Denmark.
Petersburg	United Kingdom	The ship was driven ashore and severely damaged at Snails-on-the-Wood, Pembrokeshire.

== 13 January ==
List of shipwrecks: 13 January 1836
Ship	State	Description
Bryades	United Kingdom	The ship was wrecked near the Formby Lighthouse, Lancashire. The Formby Lifeboat capsized whilst going to her aid with the loss of all but three of her crew.
Hull Packet	United Kingdom	The ship departed from Hull, Yorkshire for Stockton-on-Tees, County Durham. No further trace, presumed foundered in the North Sea with the loss of all hands.
Maria Johanna	Sweden	The ship was driven ashore at "Elfsborg", She was on a voyage from St. Ubes, Portugal to Gothenburg. She was later refloated.
Mary	United Kingdom	The ship was driven ashore at Breaksea Point, Glamorgan, where she was subsequently wrecked. She was on a voyage from Cardiff, Glamorgan to Glasgow, Renfrewshire.

== 14 January ==
List of shipwrecks: 14 January 1836
Ship	State	Description
Cecilia	United Kingdom	The ship was driven ashore at Hela, Prussia with the loss of most of her crew. She was on a voyage from London to Danzig.
Halkin	United Kingdom	The ship foundered off Ramsey, Isle of Man. Her crew were rescued. She was on a voyage from Londonderry to Runcorn, Cheshire.

== 15 January ==
List of shipwrecks: 15 January 1836
Ship	State	Description
Blackbird	(United Kingdom of Great Britain and Ireland) New South Wales	The schooner was driven ashore in Jervis Bay.
Donegal	United Kingdom	The ship was driven ashore at Garrock Head, Argyllshire. She was on a voyage from London to Greenock, Renfrewshire.
Medway	United Kingdom	The ship was lost at the entrance to the New Channel with the loss of all hands; a passenger survived. She was on a voyage from Newcastle upon Tyne, Northumberland to Liverpool, Lancashire.
Orion	United Kingdom	The ship collided with another vessel and foundered off the Haisborough Sands, in the North Sea off the coast of Norfolk. Her crew were rescued. She was on a voyage from London to Sunderland, County Durham.

== 16 January ==
List of shipwrecks: 16 January 1836
Ship	State	Description
Agnes	United Kingdom	The ship was wrecked on the Goa Sand in the North Sea off the mouth of the River Tay.
Hebe	United Kingdom	The ship was driven ashore in Loch Ryan. She was on a voyage from Irvine, Ayrshire to Dublin.
Lavinia	United Kingdom	The ship struck a sandbank in the Irish Sea off Sligo and capsized. She was on a voyage from Charleston, South Carolina, United States to Liverpool, Lancashire.
Masbro	United Kingdom	The ship departed from Stockton-on-Tees, County Durham for Rochester, Kent. No further trace, presumed foundered with the loss of all hands.

== 17 January ==
List of shipwrecks: 17 January 1836
Ship	State	Description
Eagle	United Kingdom	The ship was wrecked at Girvan, Ayrshire. Her crew were rescued.
Hebe	United Kingdom	The ship was driven ashore in Loch Ryan. She was on a voyage from Irvine, Ayrshire to Dublin.
Juno	United States	The ship ran aground on the Cohasset Rocks and was wrecked. Her crew survived. She was on a voyage from Saint Petersburg, Russia to Boston, Massachusetts.
New Bee	United Kingdom	The ship departed from Newport, Monmouthshire for Runcorn, Cheshire. No further trace, presumed foundered with the loss of all hands.
Pacific	United Kingdom	The ship was wrecked on Flores Island, Azores.

== 18 January ==
List of shipwrecks: 18 January 1836
Ship	State	Description
Dove	United States	The ship was driven ashore and wrecked at Chelsea, Massachusetts. She was on a voyage from Málaga, Spain to Boston, Massachusetts.
Egbert	United Kingdom	The ship was driven ashore at Odesa. She was on a voyage from Constantinople, Ottoman Empire to Odesa.
Elizabeth	United Kingdom	The schooner collided with the steamship Antelope (United Kingdom) and foundered. Her crew were rescued. She was on a voyage from Glasgow, Renfrewshire to Belfast, County Antrim. Elizabeth was refloated on 23 January and taken in to Greenock, Renfrewshire.
Harlington	United Kingdom	The ship was destroyed by fire at Shoreham-by-Sea, Sussex.
Iris	(United Kingdom of Great Britain and Ireland) Saint Vincent	The sloop ran aground on Duvernett Islet and sank.
Providence	France	The ship struck a sunken rock and sank near "Carlo Forte". Her crew were rescued.

== 19 January ==
List of shipwrecks: 19 January 1836
Ship	State	Description
David	United Kingdom	The sloop was driven ashore and wrecked at Sea Palling, Norfolk. Her crew were rescued. She was on a voyage from Perth to London.
Highlander	United Kingdom	The brig struck the pier and sank at Aberdeen. She was later refloated and put under repair.
Minerva	United Kingdom	The barque ran aground on the Brazil Bank, in Liverpool Bay, where she was subsequently wrecked. Her crew were rescued by lifeboat. She was on a voyage from Liverpool, Lancashire to Charleston, South Carolina, United States.

== 20 January ==
List of shipwrecks: 20 January 1836
Ship	State	Description
Fly	United Kingdom	The ship was driven ashore and wrecked at North Foreland, Kent. She was on a voyage from São Miguel Island, Azores to London.
Theodore Heinrich	Belgium	The ship was driven ashore in the Dardanelles. She was on a voyage from Antwerp to Constantinople, Ottoman Empire and Odesa.

== 21 January ==
List of shipwrecks: 21 January 1836
Ship	State	Description
Barbara	United Kingdom	The ship caught fire at Middlesbrough, Yorkshire and was scuttled.
Britannia	United Kingdom	The ship ran aground on Coquet Island, Northumberland and was severely damaged.
Comet	United Kingdom	The ship capsized and sank in the Bristol Channel. Her crew were rescued. She was on a voyage from Bideford, Devon to Bristol, Gloucestershire.
Jean	United Kingdom	The brig foundered in the Irish Sea off The Skerries. Her crew were rescued.
Laura	United Kingdom	The ship was holed by her anchor and beached at Liverpool, Lancashire. She was on a voyage from Liverpool to Demerara.
Providence	United Kingdom	The ship was abandoned in the Irish Sea off the St. Ann's Head Lighthouse with the loss of a crew member. She was on a voyage from Cardiff, Glamorgan to Porto, Portugal.

== 22 January ==
List of shipwrecks: 22 January 1836
Ship	State	Description
Canton	United Kingdom	The ship was driven ashore at Hull, Yorkshire. She was refloated on 25 January.
Comet	United Kingdom	The ship foundered in the Bristol Channel. Her crew were rescued.
Eleanor	United Kingdom	The ship was wrecked on the Bailes, off the coast of Wexford. Her crew were rescued She was on a voyage from London to Liverpool, Lancashire.
Hope	United Kingdom	The ship foundered in the North Sea off the mouth of the Humber with the loss of a crew member. She was on a voyage from Sunderland, County Durham to London.
Nancy	United Kingdom	The ship departed from Stranraer, Wigtownshire for "Port Lagoan". Presumed subsequently foundered.
Palmer	United Kingdom	The ship ran aground on the Long Sand, and consequently foundered in the North Sea off Harwich, Essex. Her crew were rescued. She was on a voyage from Newcastle upon Tyne, Northumberland to Marseille, Bouches-du-Rhône, France
Stapler	United Kingdom	The ship was driven ashore at Marfleet, Yorkshire with the loss of five of her crew. She was refloated on 25 January and taken in to Hull.
Wilhelmina	Kingdom of Hanover	The ship was wrecked near Carolinensiel. Her crew were rescued. She was on a voyage from Carolinensiel to London.

== 23 January ==
List of shipwrecks: 23 January 1836
Ship	State	Description
Alfred	United Kingdom	The ship foundered in the North Sea off Warkworth, Northumberland. Her crew were rescued. She was on a voyage from King's Lynn, Norfolk to Grangemouth, Stirlingshire.
Angelique	United Kingdom	The ship was driven ashore on Walney Island, Lancashire. She was on a voyage from Plymouth, Devon to Liverpool, Lancashire.
Betsey	United Kingdom	The sloop was wrecked at Portpatrick, Wigtownshire.
Brothers	United Kingdom	The sloop foundered in the Firth of Forth off Blackness Castle, Lothian. Her crew survived.
Constant	Netherlands	The brig sprang a leak and was beached at Holyhead, Anglesey, United Kingdom. She was on a voyage from Liverpool, Lancashire, United Kingdom to Antwerp, Belgium.
Countryman	United Kingdom	The brig was driven ashore at Carrickfergus, County Antrim.
Edward	United Kingdom	The ship was driven ashore and severely damaged at Maryport.
Eleanor, and Swift	United Kingdom	The smack Eleanor was run down and sunk in the North Sea off the Dudgeon Sandbank by the schooner Swift (United Kingdom). Eleanor's crew were rescued by Swift, which was beached on the Hawk Sandbank.
Eliza	United Kingdom	The ship was driven ashore near Ayr. Her crew were rescued. She was on a voyage from Dublin to Troon, Ayrshire.
Ellen	United Kingdom	The ship was driven ashore at Maryport. Her crew were rescued. She was on a voyage from Skerries, County Dublin to Whitehaven, Cumberland. Ellen was refloated on 16 February and taken in to Mayport in a severely damaged condition.
Esther and Jane, and Mary Ann Scott	United Kingdom	The ships collided in the Ross Roads, both were beached at Kirkcudbright.
Grotius	United States	The ship was driven ashore in Bootle Bay. She was on a voyage from New Orleans, Louisiana to Liverpool. Grotius was refloated on 1 February and taken in to Liverpool.
Hannah	United Kingdom	The sloop was wrecked on the East Hoyle Sandbank in Liverpool Bay. Her three crew were rescued.
Hardings	United Kingdom	The brig was wrecked at Redness Point, near Whitehaven, Cumberland with the loss of ten of her thirteen crew. She was on a voyage from Hamburg to Liverpool.
Jane	United Kingdom	The schooner was abandoned off the Plaskets. Her crew were rescued. She was on a voyage from London to Limerick.
John and Eliza	United Kingdom	The ship was driven ashore and damaged at Cairnryan, Wigtownshire.
John and Jenny	United Kingdom	The ship was driven ashore and severely damaged at "Ravenscraig". She was refloated the next day and taken in to Dysart, Fife.
John Metcalfe	United Kingdom	The schooner was driven ashore and wrecked in Ballyholme Bay. Her crew were rescued.
Lark	United Kingdom	The ship was driven ashore at Harrington, Cumberland. Her crew were rescued.
Levan	United Kingdom	The ship was driven ashore near "William Pitt", Cumberland. She was on a voyage from Liverpool to Greenock. She was refloated on 1 March and taken in to Whitehaven.
Liberty	United Kingdom	The brig was driven ashore near Carrickfergus.
Musgrave	United Kingdom	The brig was driven ashore and wrecked at Whitehaven. Her crew were rescued. She was on a voyage from Dublin to Whitehaven.
Reform	United Kingdom	The ship was driven ashore at Wainfleet, Lincolnshire. She was later refloated and taken in to Wainfleet.
Shamrock	United Kingdom	The ship was driven ashore on Islay. Her crew were rescued. She was on a voyage from Liverpool to Limerick.
Susan	United Kingdom	The ship was driven ashore near Crosby, Lancashire. She was on a voyage from British Honduras to Liverpool.
Susquehanna	United States	The ship was driven ashore in the Delaware River.
Swan	United Kingdom	The ship was driven ashore and severely damaged near Whitehaven. Her crew were rescued. She was on a voyage from Liverpool to Glasgow, Renfrewshire. Swan was refloated on 29 February and taken in to Whitehaven.
Thomas	(United Kingdom of Great Britain and Ireland) Isle of Man	The ship was driven ashore at Harrington. Her crew were rescued.
Thornton	United Kingdom	The ship foundered in the North Sea off Scarborough, North Riding of Yorkshire. Her crew were rescued. She was on a voyage from Newcastle upon Tyne, Northumberland to London.
Union	United Kingdom	The hermaphrodite schooner capsized off Slyne Head, County Galway. She was on a voyage from Limerick to Glasgow, Renfrewshire.
William Allen	United Kingdom	The brig was driven ashore at Portpatrick with the loss of two of her crew. She was on a voyage from Belfast, County Antrim to Jamaica. She was declared beyond economic repair.
Wesleys	United Kingdom	The ship departed from South Shields for Limerick. No further trace, presumed foundered with the loss of all hands.
Wisbert	United Kingdom	The ship departed from South Shields for Limerick. No further trace, presumed foundered with the loss of all hands.

== 24 January ==
List of shipwrecks: 24 January 1836
Ship	State	Description
Alexander	United Kingdom	The brig was driven ashore at Braystones, Cumberland. Her crew were rescued. She was refloated in late February and taken in to Whitehaven, Cumberland.
Bonitas	United Kingdom	The ship foundered in the North Sea. Her crew were rescued. She was on a voyage from Sunderland, County Durham to London.
Cardo	United Kingdom	The ship was driven ashore and wrecked at Gibraltar. She was on a voyage from Marseille, Bouches-du-Rhône, France to Glasgow, Renfrewshire.
Cowper	United Kingdom	The schooner was driven ashore and wrecked south of St. Bees. Her crew survived.
Despatch	United Kingdom	The ship was driven ashore and wrecked north of Maryport, Cumberland.
Especulation	Spain	The ship was wrecked on Grand Bahama. All on board were rescued. She was on a voyage from Havana, Cuba to Cádiz.
George and Catherine	United Kingdom	The ship foundered off Macrihanish, Argyllshire with the loss of all hands. She was on a voyage from Limerick to Glasgow, Renfrewshire.
Janet	United Kingdom	The sloop was driven ashore at Elie, Fife. Her crew were rescued.
Paquete de Matanzas	Spain	The ship was wrecked on the Egg Island Reef. She was on a voyage from Santander to Havana.

== 25 January ==
List of shipwrecks: 25 January 1836
Ship	State	Description
Agenoria	United Kingdom	The ship was driven ashore at Sheerness, Kent. She was on a voyage from Rochester, Kent to South Kent, County Durham.
Brothers	United Kingdom	The ship was lost off the coast of Cumberland. Her crew were rescued.
Industry	United Kingdom	The ship was lost off the coast of Cumberland. Her crew were rescued.
Margaret	United Kingdom	The ship was lost at Kirkcudbright.

== 26 January ==
List of shipwrecks: 26 January 1836
Ship	State	Description
Egeria	United Kingdom	The ship sprang a leak and was beached at Tarbert, Ayrshire.
Elia	Bremen	The ship was wrecked on "Hunnequhi". Her crew were rescued. She was on a voyage from Port-au-Prince, Haiti to Bremen.

== 27 January ==
List of shipwrecks: 27 January 1836
Ship	State	Description
Eclipse	United Kingdom	The ship was driven ashore and damaged on Flotta, Orkney Islands. She was on a voyage from Londonderry to Newcastle upon Tyne, Northumberland. She was later refloated and taken in to Stromness, Orkney Islands.
Friendship	Hamburg	The galiot was driven ashore and damaged near Anstruther, Fife, United Kingdom. Her crew were rescued. She was refloated on 31 January and taken in to Anstruther.
Hope	United Kingdom	The ship foundered in the North Sea off the mouth of the Humber with the loss of a crew member. She was on a voyage from Sunderland, County Durham to King's Lynn, Norfolk.
Isabella	United Kingdom	The ship was driven ashore and wrecked at Whitehaven, Cumberland. Her crew were rescued. She was on a voyage from Belfast, County Antrim to Whitehaven.
Ringdove	United Kingdom	The ship sprang a leakd and was beached at Grimsby, Lincolnshire.
Termagant	United Kingdom	The ship was driven ashore in Loch Indaal. Her crew were rescued. She was on a voyage from Liverpool, Lancashire to Ballina, County Mayo.
Thorney	United Kingdom	The ship foundered in the Bristol Channel. She was on a voyage from Bristol, Gloucestershire to Newport, Monmouthshire.
Venus	United Kingdom	The ship struck the pier and sank at Sunderland, County Durham. She was on a voyage from Sunderland to Bridlington, Yorkshire

== 28 January ==
List of shipwrecks: 28 January 1836
Ship	State	Description
Aurora	United Kingdom	The ship capsized at Swansea, Glamorgan.
Catherine	United Kingdom	The ship was wrecked at Islay, Inner Hebrides with the loss of all hands. She was on a voyage from Londonderry to Bowmore, Islay.
Eleanor	United Kingdom	The schooner was wrecked at Carmel Point, Anglesey.
Friends	United Kingdom	The ship was driven ashore near Harwich, Essex.
Friendship	United Kingdom	The ship was driven ashore at Maryport, Cumberland. She was on a voyage from Belfast, county Antrim to Maryport. Friendship was refloated on 29 February and taken in to Maryport.
Hawk	United Kingdom	The ship was wrecked near South Ronaldsay, Orkney Islands. Her crew were rescued. She was on a voyage from Peterhead, Aberdeenshire to South Ronaldsay.
Helen and Jane	United Kingdom	The sloop was driven ashore in the River Tay. She was on a voyage from Dundee, Forfarshire to Leven, Fife. She was refloated on 31 January.
Ocean	United Kingdom	The ship was driven ashore at Maryport. She was on a voyage from Dublin to Maryport.
Reindeer	United Kingdom	The ship ran aground in Carlingford Bay. She was on a voyage from Liverpool, Lancashire to Valparaíso, Chile. Reindeer was later refloated.
Summer	United Kingdom	The ship was driven ashore and wrecked at Blakeney, Norfolk.

== 29 January ==
List of shipwrecks: 29 January 1836
Ship	State	Description
Alfred Anna	France	The ship was wrecked at Guernsey, Channel Islands with the loss of two of her crew. She was on a voyage from Rouen, Seine-Inférieure to Paimpol, Côtes-du-Nord.
Dispatch	United Kingdom	The schooner was wrecked at the entrance to the Water of Urr with the loss of all hands. She was on a voyage from Liverpool, Lancashire to Dumfries.
George	United Kingdom	The steamship was driven ashore and wrecked at Rhyl, Denbighshire. Her crew were rescued. She was on a voyage from Liverpool to Rhyl.
Hawk	United Kingdom	The sloop was wrecked on South Ronaldsay, Orkney Islands. Her crew were rescued. She was on a voyage from the Orkney Islands to Peterhead, Aberdeenshire.
Ocean	United Kingdom	The steamship was driven ashore at Livorno, Tuscany.

== 30 January ==
List of shipwrecks: 30 January 1836
Ship	State	Description
Clarence	United Kingdom	The ship was lost off Kilkee, County Clare.
Diligente	French Navy	The sloop-of-war was driven ashore at Livorno, Grand Duchy of Tuscany.
Ebener	United Kingdom	The smack was run down and sunk off the Dudgeon by Swift (United Kingdom) with the loss of a crew member. Survivors were rescued by Swift, which was subsequently beached.
Grote	United Kingdom	The ship was driven ashore near Bridport, Dorset. She was on a voyage from Cork to Newport, Monmouthshire.
Intrinsic	United Kingdom	The ship was wrecked near Milltown Malbay, County Clare with the loss of all hands.
Océan	France	The steamship was driven ashore at Livorno. She was on a voyage from Naples, Kingdom of the Two Sicilies to Marseille, Bouches-du-Rhône. She was refloated on 5 February and taken in to Livorno.
Rose	United Kingdom	The ship sprang a leak and was beached at Spurn Point, Yorkshire. Her crew were rescued. She was on a voyage from Newcastle upon Tyne, Northumberland to Norwich, Norfolk.
St. Louis	France	The ship was driven ashore at Le Crotoy, Somme. She was on a voyage from Marseille, Bouches-du-Rhône to Saint-Valery-sur-Somme.

== 31 January ==
List of shipwrecks: 31 January 1836
Ship	State	Description
Erato	United Kingdom	The ship was driven ashore at Bideford, Devon. Her crew were rescued. She was on a voyage from Cork to Newport, Monmouthshire.
John	United Kingdom	The ship was wrecked on the Kentish Knock. Her crew were rescued. She was on a voyage from Sunderland, County Durham to Bordeaux, Gironde, France.
Marsella Marie	United Kingdom	The schooner was driven ashore and sank at Glass, Isla of Harris, Outer Hebrides. Her crew were rescued. She was on a voyage from Wick, Caithness to Dublin.
Maria Maude	United Kingdom	The ship was wrecked on "Glush Island". Her crew were rescued. She was on a voyage from Wick to Dublin.

== Unknown date ==
List of shipwrecks: Unknown date in January 1836
Ship	State	Description
Brilliant	United Kingdom	The ship was driven ashore and wrecked at Bermuda.
Bulwark	United Kingdom	The sloop was driven ashore at Carrickfergus, County Antrim.
Caroline	United Kingdom	The schooner was wrecked in the Macleay River, New South Wales.
Constance	Hamburg	The ship was destroyed by fire in the Atlantic Ocean. Her crew were rescued. She was on a voyage from Hamburg to Rio de Janeiro, Brazil.
Daniel O'Connell	United Kingdom	The ship was driven ashore at Lamlash, Arran. She was on a voyage from the Clyde to Wexford. Daniel O'Connell was refloated on 18 January and taken in to Campbeltown, Argyllshire.
Désir	France	The ship was wrecked near "Peimersen". Her crew were rescued.
Diana	United Kingdom	The ship was wrecked near Tunis, Tunisia with the loss of four of her crew. She was on a voyage from Smyrna, Ottoman Empire to Liverpool, Lancashire.
Eleanor	United Kingdom	The ship was wrecked near Cahore, County Wexford. Her crew were rescued. She was on a voyage from London to Liverpool.
Emerald Isle	United Kingdom	The ship was lost near Milford Haven, Pembrokeshire with the loss of all hands. She was on a voyage from Charleston, South Carolina, United States to Liverpool, Lancashire.
England	United Kingdom	The ship was abandoned in the Atlantic Ocean on or before 8 January.
Experiment	(United Kingdom of Great Britain and Ireland) New South Wales	The schooner was wrecked north of Sydney in late January.
Fanny	United Kingdom	The ship was driven ashore. She was later refloated and take in to Stockton-on-Tees, County Durham for repairs.
Fox	United Kingdom	The ship was driven ashore at Troon, Ayrshire. She was on a voyage from Chepstow, Monmouthshire to Glasgow, Renfrewshire.
Frances Ann	United Kingdom	The ship foundered in Liverpool Bay in late January.
Jovellanos	Prussia	The ship was wrecked near Quimper, Finistère, France. Her crew were rescued. She was on a voyage from Stettin to the Isles of Scilly, United Kingdom.
Minerva	United Kingdom	The hermaphrodite brig was abandoned in the Atlantic Ocean.
North Star	United States	The barque was abandoned in the Atlantic Ocean. Her crew were rescued by Sarah Cumming (United States).
Palermo	Belgium	The brig was abandoned in the Atlantic Ocean west of the Isles of Scilly.
San Jose	Portugal	The ship foundered off São Miguel Island, Azores before 24 January.
Traveller	United Kingdom	The ship foundered in the North Sea off South Shields, County Durham. She was later refloated and beached at South Shields.
True Friends	United Kingdom	The ship was driven ashore at Harwich, Essex. She was refloated on 28 January.
Union	United Kingdom	The steamship was driven ashore near Cork. She was on a voyage from Liverpool to Workington, Cumberland.
Unity	United Kingdom	The ship foundered in the River Mersey in late January.
