= Formby Lighthouse =

British Lighthouse

Coordinates: 53°32′10″N 3°04′21″W

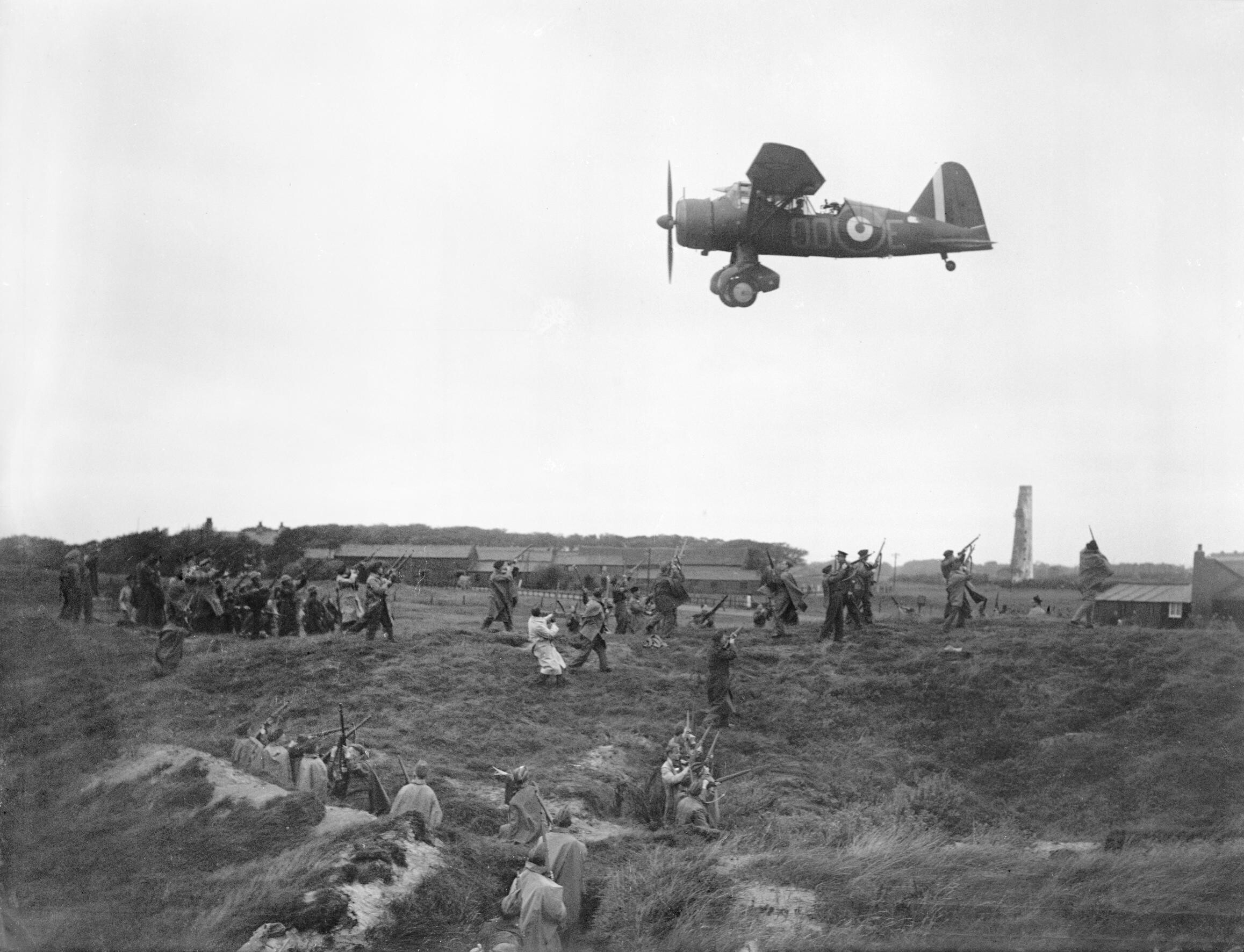
A Westland Lysander over the nearby Altcar training camp. Formby Lighthouse can be seen in the background.

Formby Lighthouse was a lighthouse station in Little Altcar, Merseyside.

The lighthouse was converted in 1834 from a structure originally built in 1719.

== See also ==
- List of shipwrecks in December 1834
- List of shipwrecks in January 1836
- List of shipwrecks in January 1854
