= List of shipwrecks in December 1834 =

The list of shipwrecks in December 1834 includes ships sunk, foundered, wrecked, grounded or otherwise lost during January 1834.

== 1 December ==
List of shipwrecks: 1 December 1834
Ship	State	Description
Ceres	Wismar	The ship was wrecked near Vila do Conde, Portugal. Her crew were rescued. She was on a voyage from Wismar to Porto, Portugal.
Elizabeth	United Kingdom	The sloop was wrecked on the Annet Sand, in the North Sea off the coast of Forfarshire. Her four crew were rescued by the Montrose Lifeboat.
Emerald	United Kingdom	The ship was wrecked on the Haisborough Sands, in the North Sea off the coast of Norfolk. Her crew were rescued. She was on a voyage from North America to Hull, Yorkshire.
Hercules	United Kingdom	The sloop was wrecked on the Annet Sand. Her crew were rescued by the Montrose Lifeboat.
Joseph	United Kingdom	The ship was in collision with Willington (United Kingdom) and was beached on the Scroby Sands, in the North Sea off the coast of Norfolk. Willington was also beached. She was refloated on 3 December and taken in to Great Yarmouth, Norfolk.
Kelvingrove	United Kingdom	The ship was driven ashore at Girvan, Ayrshire. Her crew were rescued.
Rose	United Kingdom	The lugger foundered in the English Channel off Brighton, Sussex with the loss of two of her three crew.
Thomas	United Kingdom	The schooner foundered in the Irish Sea off Pwllheli, Caernarvonshire with the loss of all hands. She was on a voyage from Arundel, Sussex to Liverpool, Lancashire.

== 2 December ==
List of shipwrecks: 2 December 1834
Ship	State	Description
Amphitrite	United Kingdom	The ship was driven ashore and wrecked 6 nautical miles (11 km) east of Pillau, Prussia. Her crew were rescued. She was on a voyage from Pillau to London.
Concepcion	Kingdom of Sardinia	The ship was wrecked near Antibes, Alpes-Maritimes, France. She was on a voyage from Genoa to Marseille, Bouches-du-Rhône, France.
Emerald	United Kingdom	The ship was wrecked on the Haisborough Sands, in the North Sea off the coast of Norfolk. Her crew were rescued. She was on a voyage from the Restigouche River, British North America to Hull, Yorkshire.
Levana	United Kingdom	The schooner foundered in the North Sea 5 nautical miles (9.3 km) off Newbiggin Point, Northumberland. Her crew were rescued by the schooner Hope (United Kingdom). Levana was on a voyage from Montrose, Forfarshire to Gainsborough, Lincolnshire.
Plenty	United Kingdom	The ship struck the pier and sank at Ramsgate, Kent.
Swea	Netherlands	The ship was driven ashore on Vlieland, Friesland. She was on a voyage from Smyrna, Ottoman Empire to Amsterdam, North Holland.
Thetis	United Kingdom	The brig capsized in the River Shannon. Her crew were rescued. She was on a voyage from Limerick to Quebec City, Lower Canada, British North America.

== 3 December ==
List of shipwrecks: 3 December 1834
Ship	State	Description
Elizabeth	United Kingdom	The brig was abandoned in the Atlantic Ocean (48°N 27°W) with the loss of six of her twelve crew. The survivors were rescued on 13 December by Caroline (United Kingdom). Elizabeth was on a voyage from Quebec City, Lower Canada, British North America to Padstow, Cornwall.
Hetty Clifton	United Kingdom	The ship was driven ashore south of Blackpool, Lancashire. She was on a voyage from Dundalk, County Louth to Preston, Lancashire.
Twa Brodre	Sweden	The ship was wrecked near Kalmar. Her crew were rescued. She was on a voyage from Kalmar to Hull, Yorkshire, United Kingdom.

== 4 December ==
List of shipwrecks: 4 December 1834
Ship	State	Description
Green Jul	France	The ship was wrecked near San Juan de Nicaragua, Nicaragua. she was on a voyage from "St. Pian" to Bordeaux, Gironde.

== 5 December ==
List of shipwrecks: 5 December 1834
Ship	State	Description
Carolina Frederika	[[[Gdańsk|Danzig]]	The ship was friven ashore and wrecked near "Schwartroth". She was on a voyage from Danzig to Hull, Yorkshire, United Kingdom.
Fancina	Ottoman Empire	The ship was driven ashore on the "Zendwall". She was on a voyage from Constantinople to Amsterdam, North Holland, Netherlands.
Good Czar	United Kingdom	The ship was abandoned in the Atlantic Ocean. Her crew were rescued by Kent (United Kingdom). Good Czar was on a voyage from Pugwash, Nova Scotia, British North America to Berwick upon Tweed, Northumberland.
Johanna Catherina	Netherlands	The ship was driven ashore on Texel, North Holland. She was on a voyage from Bordeaux, Gironde, France to Amsterdam.
Wallsend	United Kingdom	The ship was in collision with Oriental (United Kingdom) in the Irish Sea off Point Lynas, Anglesey and was abandoned. She was on a voyage from Quebec City, Lower Canada, British North America to Liverpool, Lancashire.

== 6 December ==
List of shipwrecks: 6 December 1834
Ship	State	Description
Carolina	Stettin	The ship was driven ashore near Łeba. She was on a voyage from Liverpool, Lancashire, United Kingdom to Stettin.
Oscar	United Kingdom	The ship was driven ashore at Branahuie, Outer Hebrides. Her crew were rescued. She was on a voyage from Londonderry to London.

== 7 December ==
List of shipwrecks: 7 December 1834
Ship	State	Description
Essy	United Kingdom	The ship was wrecked on Dalkey Island, County Dublin. She was on a voyage from Wicklow to Dublin.
Glory	United Kingdom	The ship was driven ashore in the Dardanelles.
Lydia	United Kingdom	The schooner was wrecked on Tory Island, County Donegal with the loss of all hands. She was on a voyage from Sligo to London.
Martha	United Kingdom	The ship ran aground on the North Bank, in Liverpool Bay and was abandoned by her crew. She was on a voyage from Quebec City, Lower Canada, British North America to Liverpool, Lancashire. Martha was later refloated and taken in to Liverpool.
Ossian	United Kingdom	The ship was in collision with Planter (United Kingdom) in the North Sea off Lowestoft, Suffolk and sank. She was on a voyage from North Shields, County Durham to London.
Regina	United Kingdom	The ship was wrecked on the Cobbler Rock, off Barbados. Her crew were rescued.
Swallow	United Kingdom	The ship was in collision with Civilian (United Kingdom) off the mouth of the Humber and sank. She was on a voyage from London to Hull, Yorkshire.

== 8 December ==
List of shipwrecks: 8 December 1834
Ship	State	Description
Benjamin	United Kingdom	The ship was driven ashore and wrecked at Longhope, Orkney Islands.
Fanchon	Sweden	The ship was driven ashore at Stromness, Orkney Islands. She was on a voyage from Stockholm to Rio de Janeiro, Brazil.
Feronia	United Kingdom	The ship was driven ashore at Stromness.
Friends	United Kingdom	The ship foundered in the Irish Sea off the Calf of Man, Isle of Man with the loss of two of her crew. She was on a voyage from Liverpool, Lancashire to the Strangford Lough.
Hibernia	United Kingdom	The ship was driven ashore at Stromness.
Hunter	United Kingdom	The ship was driven ashore and wrecked at Scrabster, Caithness. She was on a voyage from Liverpool to Fisherrow, Aberdeenshire.
Jane and Betty	United Kingdom	The ship was driven ashore in Church Bay. Her crew were rescued.
Juno	United Kingdom	The brig was wrecked 3 nautical miles (5.6 km) west of Cape Wrath, Caithness with the loss of six of her seven crew. She was on a voyage from Saint Petersburg, Russia to Belfast, County Antrim.
Lydia	United Kingdom	The schooner was wrecked on Tory Island, County Donegal with the loss of all hands. She was on a voyage from Sligo to London.
Margaret Miller	United Kingdom	The ship was wrecked near Mobile, Alabama, United States. Her crew were rescued. She was on a voyage from Belfast, County Antrim to Mobile.
Mary	United Kingdom	The schooner was driven ashore at Longhope.
Mary	United Kingdom	The ship was wrecked on Pelican Island, New Jersey, United States. She was on a voyage from Belfast, County Antrim to Mobile, Alabama, United States.
Merchant	United Kingdom	The ship was driven ashore in Bootle Bay. She was on a voyage from New Orleans, Louisiana, United States to Liverpool, Lancashire.
Naiad	United Kingdom	The ship was driven ashore and wrecked in the Sound of Hoy.
Ocean	United Kingdom	The brig was driven ashore crewless at Culzean Castle, Ayrshire. She was on a voyage from Dublin to Irvine, Ayrshire.
Resolution	United Kingdom	The ship was wrecked in Lamlash Bay. Her crew were rescued.
Traveller	United Kingdom	The brig was driven ashore and wrecked at Galson, Butt of Lewis, Outer Hebrides with the loss of a crew member. She was on a voyage from Quebec City, Lower Canada, British North America to Dundee, Forfarshire.

== 9 December ==
List of shipwrecks: 9 December 1834
Ship	State	Description
Albino	Netherlands	The ship was driven ashore at Vlissingen, Zeeland. She was on a voyage from Smyrna, Ottoman Empire to Amsterdam, North Holland.
Amsterdam	Netherlands	The ship was driven ashore near Zandvoort, North Holland. She was on a voyage from Surinam to Amsterdam.
Concordia	Netherlands	The ship was driven ashore at Scheveningen, South Holland. Her crew were rescued. She was on a voyage from Hull, Yorkshire, United Kingdom to Rotterdam, South Holland.
Eleanor	United Kingdom	The ship was wrecked on Bornholm, Denmark. Her crew were rescued. She was on a voyage from Riga, Russia to Londonderry.
George and Ellen	United Kingdom	The ship was driven ashore and wrecked near the Formby Lighthouse, Lancashire. She was on a voyage from the Barbary Coast to Liverpool, Lancashire.
Manlius	United Kingdom	The barque was wrecked in Placentia Bay with the loss of thirteen lives. She was on a voyage from Quebec City, Lower Canada, British North America to the Clyde.
Martha	United Kingdom	The ship was wrecked in Liverpool Bay. She was on a voyage from Quebec City to Liverpool.
Sir Thomas Munro	United Kingdom	The ship was wrecked on Boa Vista, Cape Verde Islands with the loss of two of the 70 people on board. She was on a voyage from London to Hobart, Van Diemen's Land.

== 10 December ==
List of shipwrecks: 10 December 1834
Ship	State	Description
Alfred	(United Kingdom of Great Britain and Ireland) Guernsey	The ship foundered in the English Channel off Shoreham-by-Sea, Sussex, or Walcheren, Zeeland, Netherlands. Seven of her crew were rescued. She was on a voyage from Guernsey to Rotterdam, South Holland, Netherlands.
Emilia	Portugal	The ship departed from Figueira da Foz for Bristol, Gloucestershire, United Kingdom. No further trace, presumed foundered with the loss of all hands.
Marcus	France	The ship was abandoned off Dénia, Spain. She was on a voyage from Sète, Hérault to Havre de Grâce, Seine-Inférieure.
Mary Ann	(United Kingdom of Great Britain and Ireland) British North America	The ship was wrecked near the mouth of the River Duddon.
Swift	United Kingdom	The ship was driven ashore at Longhope, Orkney Islands. She was on a voyage from Letterkenny, County Donegal to London.

== 11 December ==
List of shipwrecks: 11 December 1834
Ship	State	Description
Christiana	(Russian Empire) Grand Duchy of Finland	The ship was wrecked on the coast of Jutland with the loss of her captain. She was on a voyage from Helsinki to Livorno, Grand Duchy of Tuscany.
United States	United States	The ship ran aground in the River Mersey at Liverpool, Lancashire, United Kingdom and was severely damaged. She was on a voyage from Liverpool to New York.

== 12 December ==
List of shipwrecks: 12 December 1834
Ship	State	Description
Columbia	United Kingdom	The ship was lost off Nassau, Bahamas. Her crew were rescued.

== 13 December ==
List of shipwrecks: 13 December 1834
Ship	State	Description
Brunswick	United Kingdom	The ship ran aground on the Long Sand, in the North Sea off the coast of Kent and was abandoned. She was refloated the next day and taken in to Sheerness, Kent in a capsized condition. Brunswick was on a voyage from Saint Petersburg, Russia to London.
Constitution	United Kingdom	The schooner was in collision with the smack William and Amelia (United Kingdom) and sank in the English Channel off The Lizard, Cornwall. Her crew were rescued. She was on a voyage from London to Liverpool, Lancashire.
Mowbray	United Kingdom	The brig struck rocks off Redcar, Yorkshire and sank. Two of her crew were rescued.

== 14 December ==
List of shipwrecks: 14 December 1834
Ship	State	Description
Hope	United Kingdom	The ship was wrecked in a hurricane at Laguira, Cuba.
Julia	United Kingdom	The ship was wrecked in a hurricane at Laguira.

== 15 December ==
List of shipwrecks: 15 December 1834
Ship	State	Description
Anna Prorocizza	Kingdom of the Two Sicilies	The ship was driven ashore between Mazara do Vila and Marsala. She had been refloated by 3 January 1835. Anna Prorocizza was on a voyage from Odesa to Constantinople, Ottoman Empire and Palermo.
Fitzroy	United Kingdom	The ship was abandoned in the Grand Banks of Newfoundland (46°N 42°W). Her crew were rescued by Caroline (United Kingdom). Fitzroy came ashore at Skibbereen, County Cork on 7 March 1835 and was wrecked.
Henry	United Kingdom	The ship was abandoned in the Atlantic Ocean. Sarah (United Kingdom) rescued all 144 people on board. Henry was on a voyage from Liverpool, Lancashire to New York, United States.

== 17 December ==
List of shipwrecks: 17 December 1834
Ship	State	Description
Fanny	United Kingdom	The ship was wrecked on the Leaston Sand. Her crew were rescued.
Malvina	United Kingdom	The ship was driven ashore near Húns, Friesland, Netherlands. She was on a voyage from Quebec City, Lower Canada, British North America to Grangemouth, Stirlingshire.
Mitchell	United Kingdom	The ship was wrecked at the mouth of the Tees. Her crew were rescued by the Stockton Lifeboat. She was on a voyage from Rotterdam, South Holland, Netherlands to Stockton-on-Tees, County Durham.
William and Mary	United Kingdom	The ship was wrecked on the Humberstone Sand, in the North Sea off Tetney, Lincolnshire with the loss of all hands.
William Money	United Kingdom	The ship ran aground on the Marricouga Shoal. She was on a voyage from Quebec City, Lower Canada, British North America to London. William Money was refloated in August 1835 and taken to Quebec City.

== 18 December ==
List of shipwrecks: 18 December 1834
Ship	State	Description
Endeavour	United Kingdom	The ship sprang a leak and foundered in the Humber. She was on a voyage from Goole, Yorkshire to Boston, Lincolnshire.
Hibernia	United Kingdom	The ship was wrecked on South Sandy Island. She was on a voyage from Liverpool, Lancashire to Nevis.
Rambler	United Kingdom	The ship was driven ashore at Father Point, Lower Canada, British North America. She was on a voyage from Quebec City, Lower Canada to Dublin.
Seven Brothers	United Kingdom	The ship was wrecked on South Point, Barbados. Her crew were rescued.
Sir James Anderson	United Kingdom	The ship was abandoned in the Atlantic Ocean. Her crew were rescued by Terys (United Kingdom). Sir James Anderson was on a voyage from Quebec City, Lower Canada, British North America to Liverpool, Lancashire. She came ashore on Rhum, Inner Hebrides on 11 March 1835 and was wrecked.

== 19 December ==
List of shipwrecks: 19 December 1834
Ship	State	Description
Duke of Wellington	United Kingdom	The ship was wrecked on the Cross Sand, in the North Sea off the coast of Norfolk with the loss of three of her four crew. She was on a voyage from Hull, Yorkshire to Jersey, Channel Islands.

== 21 December ==
List of shipwrecks: 21 December 1834
Ship	State	Description
Jane	United Kingdom	The ship was run down and sunk in the Irish Sea off Point Lynas, Anglesey by the pilot boat No. 5 (United Kingdom). Two of her crew were lost.
Orion	United Kingdom	The ship foundered.
Rob Roy	United Kingdom	The ship departed from Limerick for London. No further trace, presumed foundered with the loss of all hands.
Wilhelmine Catherine	Norway	The ship was wrecked on the Haisborough Sands, in the North Sea off the coast of Norfolk, United Kingdom. Her crew were rescued by James Watt (United Kingdom). Wilhelmine Catherine was on a voyage from Bergen to Madeira, Portugal.
William and Mary	United Kingdom	The barque was wrecked at Coringa, India.

== 22 December ==
List of shipwrecks: 22 December 1834
Ship	State	Description
Apollo	United Kingdom	The ship was driven ashore at Wells-next-the-Sea, Norfolk. She was on a voyage from Hull, Yorkshire to London.
Reform	Hamburg	The ship was wrecked at Maranhão, Brazil. She was on a voyage from Hamburg to Maranhão.

== 23 December ==
List of shipwrecks: 23 December 1834
Ship	State	Description
Eliza	United Kingdom	The ship was driven ashore near "Nehruny". Her crew were rescued. She was on a voyage from Memel, Prussia to Antwerp, Belgium.
Favourite	United Kingdom	The ship was driven ashore near "Nehruny". Her crew were rescued. She was on a voyage from Memel to Dundee, Forfarshire.
Frau Margaretha	Hamburg	The ship was driven ashore on the "Hock". She was on a voyage from Hull, Yorkshire, United Kingdom to Hamburg.

== 25 December ==
List of shipwrecks: 25 December 1834
Ship	State	Description
Harlequin	United Kingdom	The paddle steamer was destroyed by fire in the River Thames at the Tower of London. All on board were rescued. She was on a voyage from Hamburg to London.
John Vianna	United Kingdom	The ship was wrecked on the Barrel Rocks, in the Atlantic Ocean off the coast of County Cork with the loss of all hands. She was on a voyage from Palermo, Sicily to Liverpool, Lancashire.
St. Winifrede	France	The steamship was destroyed by fire at Naples, Kingdom of the Two Sicilies. She was on a voyage from Marseille, Bouches-du-Rhône to Naples.

== 26 December ==
List of shipwrecks: 26 December 1834
Ship	State	Description
Lucie	(United Kingdom of Great Britain and Ireland) British North America	The ship was driven ashore at St. Peter's, Nova Scotia. Her crew were rescued.

== 27 December ==
List of shipwrecks: 27 December 1834
Ship	State	Description
Autumn	United Kingdom	The sloop was wrecked on the Naestone Rock, in the North Sea off the Farne Islands, Northumberland with the loss of two of her three crew. The survivor was rescued by the keeper of the Longstone Lighthouse and his sons.
John	United Kingdom	The ship was driven ashore at Mazara del Vallo, Sicily. She was on a voyage from Beyrout, Mount Lebanon Emirate to Liverpool, Lancashire.
Oscar	United Kingdom	The ship was driven ashore and wrecked at Stornoway, Isle of Lewis Her crew were rescued. She was on a voyage from Londonderry to London.

== 28 December ==
List of shipwrecks: 28 December 1834
Ship	State	Description
Æolus	United Kingdom	The schooner was abandoned in the Irish Sea. Her crew were rescued by Avalon (United Kingdom). Æolus was on a voyage from Limerick to Glasgow, Renfrewshire.
Jane Ingram	United Kingdom	The ship was wrecked on the Long Sand, in the North Sea. All on board were rescued.
Sarah	United Kingdom	The ship was driven ashore at Aberthaw, Glamorgan. She was on a voyage from São Miguel, Azores, Portugal to Bristol, Gloucestershire.

== 29 December ==
List of shipwrecks: 29 December 1834
Ship	State	Description
Bolivar	United Kingdom	The ship was abandoned in the Atlantic Ocean off Mizen Head, County Cork. Her crew were rescued by Ebenezer (United Kingdom).
Traveller	United Kingdom	The brig was driven ashore and wrecked at Galston. Isle of Lewis with the loss of a crew member. She was on a voyage from Quebec City, Lower Canada, British North America to Dundee, Forfarshire.

== 30 December ==
List of shipwrecks: 30 December 1834
Ship	State	Description
Gazelle	United States	The ship was driven ashore near Boston, Massachusetts. She was on a voyage from Smyrna, Ottoman Empire to Boston.
Times	United Kingdom	The ship was wrecked on Terschelling, Friesland, Netherlands. Her crew survived. She was on a voyage from Hull, Yorkshire to Hamburg.

== 31 December ==
List of shipwrecks: 31 December 1834
Ship	State	Description
Concord	United Kingdom	The ship was driven ashore on The Skerries, Isle of Anglesey.
Frederick Langley	United Kingdom	The ship was driven ashore on Oyster Island, County Sligo. She was on a voyage from Sierra Leone to Liverpool, Lancashire.
Highfield	United Kingdom	The ship was driven ashore on The Skerries. She was on a voyage from Liverpool to Dublin.
Irene	United Kingdom	The schooner was driven ashore on The Skerries. She was on a voyage from Liverpool to Faial, Azores, Portugal.
Julia	Belgium	The ship struck rocks off the Isles of Scilly, United Kingdom and was beached on Tresco. She was on a voyage from Liverpool to Antwerp.
Peggy	United Kingdom	The ship was wrecked off Tiree, Outer Hebrides. She was on a voyage from Saint John, New Brunswick, British North America to Liverpool.
Sophia	United Kingdom	The ship was driven ashore at Waterford. She was on a voyage from Quebec City, Lower Canada, British North America to Liverpool.
Stephen	United Kingdom	The ship was wrecked in Bangor Bay. She was on a voyage from Dublin to Liverpool.
Telford	United Kingdom	The smack was driven ashore on The Skerries. She was on a voyage from Dublin to Londonderry.
Wellington	United Kingdom	The ship was driven ashore and wrecked at Holyhead, Anglesey with the loss of a crew member. She was on a voyage from Seville, Spain to London.

== Unknown date ==
List of shipwrecks: Unknown date 1834
Ship	State	Description
Bon Père	France	The ship was wrecked at Dénia, Spain. She was on a voyage from Marseille, Bouches-du-Rhône to Marans, Charente-Maritime.
Dawn	United Kingdom	The ship was wrecked at Domesnes, Russia before 25 December. She was on a voyage from Riga, Russia to London.
Dorothea Marianne	flag unknown	The ship was driven ashore near "Ollendorf", Duchy of Holstein. She was later refloated.
Franceira	Netherlands	The ship was driven ashore on the "Zendwall". She was on a voyage from Constantinople, Ottoman Empire to Amsterdam, North Holland.
Nora	France	The ship was wrecked on the coast of Senegal.
Providentia	flag unknown	The ship foundered in the North Sea off Juist, Kingdom of Hanover before 26 December.
Sidsel Maria	Hamburg	The ship foundered off Sylt, Denmark on or before 9 December.
Swea	Netherlands	The ship was driven ashore on Vlieland, Friesland. She was on a voyage from Smyrna, Ottoman Empire to Amsterdam.
Swift	(United Kingdom of Great Britain and Ireland) British North America	The ship foundered before 23 December.
Trefusis	United Kingdom	The ship was driven ashore at Livorno, Grand Duchy of Tuscany.
