= List of shipwrecks in January 1854 =

The list of shipwrecks in January 1854 includes ships sunk, foundered, wrecked, grounded, or otherwise lost during January 1854.

== 1 January ==
List of shipwrecks: 1 January 1854
Ship	State	Description
Borneo	United States	The ship was abandoned in the Atlantic Ocean. Her crew were rescued by Cobden (United States). Borneo was on a voyage from New York to London, United Kingdom.
D'Arcy	United Kingdom	The brig ran aground on the Gratindo Rocks, in the Thanlwin. She was refloated and resumed her voyage.
David	United Kingdom	The smack was driven ashore on Goeree, Zeeland, Netherlands. She was on a voyage from Perth to London.
Eurotas	United Kingdom	The paddle steamer was wrecked near Alexandria, Egypt Eyalet. She was on a voyage from Jaffa, Ottoman Syria to Alexandria.
Flying Eagle	United States	The schooner was abandoned in the Atlantic Ocean. Her crew were rescued by the brig S. G. Bass (United States). Flying Eagle was on a voyage from Havana, Cuba to Portland, Maine.
Henry Chapman	United Kingdom	The ship departed from Valparaíso, Chile for Swansea, Glamorgan. No further trace, presumed foundered with the loss of all hands.
Martha Annette	Danzig	The ship was lost off the mouth of the Humber with the loss of a crew member. Survivors were rescued by a fishing smack. She was on a voyage from Danzig to Aberdeen, United Kingdom.
Minnie	United Kingdom	The ship was driven ashore on the north coast of Antigua. She was refloated and taken in to a port in Antigua for repairs.
Witch	United Kingdom	The barque was driven ashore at Crosby, Lancashire. She was on a voyage from Bahia, Brazil to Liverpool, Lancashire. She was refloated on 5 January and taken in to Liverpool,

== 2 January ==
List of shipwrecks: 2 January 1854
Ship	State	Description
Boa Fé	Portugal	The ship was driven ashore at Portishead, Somerset, United Kingdom. She was on a voyage from Bristol, Gloucestershire, United Kingdom to São Miguel Island, Azores.
John	United Kingdom	The ship was driven ashore and capsized at Strangford, County Louth. She was righted on 14 January.
Iroquois	United Kingdom	The ship ran aground on the West Rocks, in the North Sea off the coast of Essex. She was refloated and put in to Lowestoft, Suffolk in a leaky condition.
Recorder	(United Kingdom of Great Britain and Ireland) British North America	The ship was driven onto a ledge of rocks on being launched at Carleton, New Brunswick. She was declared a total loss.

== 3 January ==
List of shipwrecks: 3 January 1854
Ship	State	Description
Alert	United Kingdom	The brig was driven ashore 2 nautical miles (3.7 km) north of Winterton-on-Sea, Norfolk. Her crew were rescued. She was on a voyage from Harwich, Essex to Hartlepool, County Durham. She was refloated on 18 January and towed in to Great Yarmouth, Norfolk.
Argus	United Kingdom	The brig was run ashore in Cadnœt Creek, Anglesey. She was on a voyage from Pictou, Nova Scotia, British North America to the Clyde.
Atalanta	United Kingdom	The schooner was wrecked at Exmouth, Devon. Her crew were rescued.
Advena	United Kingdom	The brig was driven onto Samson, Isles of Scilly, in a southeast gale. She was on a voyage from Galaţi, Ottoman Empire to Sunderland, County Durham. She was re-floated at high water after her masts were removed.
Antelope	United Kingdom	The ship was driven ashore and wrecked at Middleton, County Durham. Her crew were rescued. She was on a voyage from Stockton-on-Tees, County Durham to London.
Blair	United Kingdom	The schooner was driven ashore at Douglas, Isle of Man. she was on a voyage from Dublin to Maryport, Cumberland. She was refloated.
Ellen	United Kingdom	The brig was driven ashore and wrecked at Sines, Portugal.
Emma	United Kingdom	The Yorkshire Billyboy foundered in the English Channel off St. Alban's Head, Dorset.
Farmer	United Kingdom	The brigantine sprang a leak off the Point of Ayre, Isle of Man and was consequently beached in the Belfast Lough. She was on a voyage from Liverpool, Lancashire to Belfast, County Antrim.
Friends	United Kingdom	The schooner was wrecked on the Poles Sandbank, in the English Channel off the coast of Devon with the loss of one of her five crew. She was on a voyage from Hartlepool, County Durham to Exeter, Devon.
Hannah	United Kingdom	The collier, a brig, was driven ashore at Tynemouth, Northumberland. Her crew were rescued by the South Shields Lifeboat. Her captain remained aboard. Hannah was on a voyage from Hartlepool to London. She was later refloated and taken in to Tynemouth.
Heir of Madryn	United Kingdom	The ship was driven ashore and wrecked at Charlestown, Cornwall.
Henry	United Kingdom	The brig struck the breakwater at Holyhead, Anglesey and was damaged. She was consequently beached in Pestmynath Bay. She was on a voyage from Cardiff, Glamorgan to Liverpool, Lancashire.
Ida	United Kingdom	The ship sprang a leak and was beached at Figueira da Foz, Portugal, where she was wrecked. Her crew were rescued. She was on a voyage from Newcastle upon Tyne, Northumberland to Porto, Portugal.
Juno	Russia	The brig was wrecked near Conil, Spain with the loss of a crew member. She was on a voyage from Liverpool to Genoa, Kingdom of Sardinia.
Leo	Hamburg	The galiot was driven ashore at Sines. She was consequently condemned.
Margaret	United Kingdom	The schooner was driven ashore and sank at "Claughton Wyke", Yorkshire.
Marquis of Sligo	United Kingdom	The ship struck the Mort Stone and was beached at Appledore, Devon. She was on a voyage from Newport, Monmouthshire to Torquay, Devon.
Pearl	United Kingdom	The ship departed from The Downs for Cartagena, Spain. No further trace, presumed foundered with the loss of all hands.
Richard Cobden	United Kingdom	The ship was foundered in the Mediterranean Sea off Sardinia. Her crew were rescued.
Sprite	United Kingdom	The ship was driven ashore at Portland, Dorset.
Susan	United Kingdom	The brig was driven ashore and wrecked at Sines.
Vrouw Neetje	Netherlands	The ship was wrecked on the Goodwin Sands, Kent, United Kingdom with the loss of all hands.

== 4 January ==
List of shipwrecks: 4 January 1854
Ship	State	Description
Abraham	United Kingdom	The brig was driven ashore and wrecked south of Gorlestone, Suffolk with the loss of all hands.
Active	United Kingdom	The ship was driven ashore near Blyth, Northumberland. She was on a voyage from Littlehampton, Sussex to Sunderland, County Durham. She was refloated on 16 January and taken in to Warkworth, Northumberland.
Albatross	United Kingdom	The brig was driven ashore at Sunderland. Her crew were rescued using Carte's rocket apparatus. She was later refloated and taken in to Sunderland.
Alfred	United Kingdom	The ship was damaged at Hartlepool, County Durham.
Amphitrite	United Kingdom	The brig was driven ashore and wrecked at Tynemouth, Northumberland. Her crew were rescued.
Anna	United Kingdom	The ship was driven ashore and wrecked on the Black Middens or at Tynemouth. Her crew were rescued by rocket apparatus.
Ann and Elizabeth	United Kingdom	The brig was driven ashore at Tynemouth. She was refloated on 16 January.
Annette	United Kingdom	The brig was wrecked on the Goodwin Sands, Kent, United Kingdom. Her crew were rescued by the luggers Briton's Pride and Seaman's Hope (both United Kingdom). Annette was on a voyage from St. Ubes, Portugal to Stavanger.
Antelope	United Kingdom	The ship was driven ashore and wrecked on the Black Middens or at Tynemouth. Her crew were rescued by rocket apparatus.
Antonette Petrea	Norway	The brig was wrecked at West Hartlepool. She was on a voyage from Drammen to London, United Kingdom.
Arcadian	United Kingdom	The brig was in collision with another vessel and was beached at Newport, Rhode Island, United States. She was on a voyage from Windsor, Nova Scotia, British North America to Newport. She was later refloated and taken in to Newport.
Arethusa	United Kingdom	The ship was driven onto the Black Middens and wrecked. Her crew were rescued by rocket apparatus.
Arne, or Aroe	United Kingdom	The ship was driven ashore and sank at Hartlepool. Her crew were rescued by the Hartlepool Lifeboat. She was on a voyage from Hartlepool to London.
Augustus Caroline	Flag unknown	The ship was damaged at Hartlepool.
Ayres Quay	United Kingdom	The ship was driven ashore at Middleton. Her crew were rescued by the Hartlepool Lifeboat. She was later refloated and taken in to Hartlepool.
Bedlington	United Kingdom	The schooner was driven ashore at Whitby, Yorkshire. Her crew were rescued. She was on a voyage from Folkestone, Kent to Whitby.
Beata	France	The full-rigged ship was driven ashore and wrecked at Hartlepool. Her crew were rescued.
Beta	France	The schooner was driven ashore at Whitby. She was on a voyage from London to Whitby. She was refloated on 16 January and taken in to Whitby.
Blondine	(United Kingdom of Great Britain and Ireland) British North America	The brig was driven ashore near Holyhead, Anglesey. She was refloated on 15 January.
Boston	United Kingdom	The brig was driven ashore at Boston, Massachusetts, United States. All on board were rescued. She was on a voyage from Halifax, Nova Scotia, British North America to Boston.
Buchan	United Kingdom	The ship was damaged at Hartlepool.
Catherine Green	United Kingdom	The barque was driven ashore at Sunderland. She was refloated on 30 January and towed in to Sunderland.
Catherine Marie	Denmark	The ship was driven ashore in Druridge Bay with the loss of all hands.
Citizen	United Kingdom	The ship was driven ashore at Middleton, County Durham. Her crew were rescued. She was refloated on 16 January and taken in to Hartlepool.
Clara	United Kingdom	The brig was driven ashore at Sunderland.
Clio	United Kingdom	The ship was driven ashore and wrecked at Hartlepool.
Commerce	United Kingdom	The ship was driven ashore at Warkworth. Her crew were rescued. She was refloated on 16 January and taken in to Warkworth in a severely damaged condition.
Content	United Kingdom	The brig was driven against the pier and sank at Sunderland.
Coolock	United Kingdom	The ship was driven ashore at South Shields.
Countess	United Kingdom	The ship was driven ashore in Mill Bay, Essex.
Dapper	United Kingdom	The brig was driven ashore, capsized and was wrecked at Hartlepool with the loss of six of her eight crew. Survivors were rescued by the Hartlepool Lifeboat.
Devonshire	United Kingdom	The schooner was driven ashore at Sunderland. Her crew were rescued by the Sunderland Lifeboat. She subsequently became a wreck.
Donnington	United Kingdom	The schooner was driven ashore at Whitby. Her crew were rescued. She was on a voyage from London to Whitby.
Earl of Newborough	United Kingdom	The barque was driven ashore and wrecked near Warkworth. Her crew were rescued.
Earl of Seafield	United Kingdom	The ship capsized and was wrecked at Wallsend, Northumberland.
Echo	United Kingdom	The ship was driven ashore and wrecked at Hartlepool. Her crew were rescued.
Effort	United Kingdom	The brig was driven ashore at Sunderland.
Eliza	United Kingdom	The schooner ran aground and capsized on the Black Middens, in the North Sea off the coast of County Durham with the loss of all on board. The ship's dog survived.
Eliza	United Kingdom	The ship was driven ashore and wrecked at the Mumbles, Glamorgan. Her crew were rescued.
Eliza	United Kingdom	The collier, a brig, was driven ashore at Hopton-on-Sea, Suffolk. Her crew survived. She was on a voyage from Hartlepool to the River Thames.
Elizabeth	United Kingdom	The ship was driven ashore and wrecked at Hartlepool. Her crew were rescued.
Elizabeth	United Kingdom	The brig was driven ashore at Sunderland.
Elizabeth	United Kingdom	The ship was driven ashore at Warkworth.
Elizabeth	United Kingdom	The Kirkwall-registered ship was driven ashore and wrecked at Tynemouth Her crew were rescued.
Elizabeth	United Kingdom	The South Shields-registered ship was driven ashore and wrecked at Tynemouth with the loss of all hands.
Elizabeth	United Kingdom	The South Shields-registered ship was driven onto the Black Middens. Her crew were rescued by rocket apparatus.
Elizabeth Adnett	United Kingdom	The brig was driven ashore south of Warkworth. Her crew were rescued. She was on a voyage from London to South Shields. She was refloated on 16 January and taken in to Warkworth in a severely damaged condition. Subsequently repaired at Blyth.
Elizabeth and Sarah	United Kingdom	The ship was driven ashore at Middleton. Her crew were rescued.
Elizabeth Ann	United Kingdom	The brig was driven ashore at Tynemouth.
Ellen Cooke	United Kingdom	The schooner was driven ashore and severely damaged at Sunderland.
Emily Ann	United Kingdom	The ship was run into by a schooner and was beached at Harwich, Essex.
Emma	United Kingdom	The ship was damaged at Hartlepool.
Emma	United Kingdom	The ship capsized in the English Channel off St Albans Head, Dorset with the loss of all hands.
Erin	United Kingdom	The brig was driven ashore at the Mumbles. She was on a voyage from Cork to Cardiff, Glamorgan. She was refloated on 13 January and taken in to Swansea, Glamorgan.
Etna	United Kingdom	The ship was damaged at Hartlepool.
Europa	United Kingdom	The ship was driven ashore and wrecked at Tynemouth Her crew were rescued.
Evening Star	United Kingdom	The ship was driven ashore at Portland, Maine. She was on a voyage from Portland to Liverpool. She was refloated and resumed her voyage.
Eweretta	United Kingdom	The barque ran aground on the Black Middens and was wrecked. Her crew were rescued by rocket apparatus.
Favourite	United Kingdom	The ship was driven ashore and wrecked at Hartlepool. She was refloated on 28 January and taken in to Hartlepool.
Friends	United Kingdom	The ship was driven ashore and wrecked at Sunderland. She was refloated on 30 January and towed in to Sunderland.
George	United Kingdom	The ship was damaged at Hartlepool. She was refloated on 13 January.
Good Intent	United Kingdom	The ship was driven ashore and severely damaged at Sunderland.
Grouse	United Kingdom	The sloop was driven ashore at Great Yarmouth, Norfolk. Her crew were rescued.
Guard	United Kingdom	The ship was driven ashore at Sunderland.
Harmony	United Kingdom	The brig was driven ashore at Tynemouth. She was refloated on 23 January.
Harmony	United Kingdom	The brig was driven ashore and severely damaged at Sunderland. Her crew were rescued by the Sunderland Lifeboat.
Harvest	United Kingdom	The brig was driven ashore and severely damaged at Sunderland. She was refloated on 30 January and towed in to Sunderland.
Helen Cook	United Kingdom	The ship was driven ashore at Sunderland. She was refloated on 15 January and towed in to Sunderland.
Heroine	United Kingdom	The sloop was driven ashore near Warkworth. Her crew were rescued. She was refloated on 9 January.
Hopewell	United Kingdom	The Yorkshire Billyboy was driven ashore and wrecked at Bridlington, Yorkshire. She was on a voyage from Newcastle upon Tyne to the Humber.
Ibis	United Kingdom	The ship was damaged at Hartlepool.
Isabella	United Kingdom	The ship was driven ashore at Seaton Carew, County Durham. Her crew were rescued. She was refloated on 28 January and taken in to Hartlepool.
Isabella	(United Kingdom of Great Britain and Ireland) Jersey	The schooner was driven ashore and wrecked at Hartlepool. Her crew were rescued. She was refloated on 19 January and taken in to Hartlepool.
Isabella and Sarah	United Kingdom	The ship was driven ashore at Hartlepool.
Jamaica	United Kingdom	The brig was wrecked on the Ooster Bank, in the North Sea off the Dutch coast. Her crew were rescued. She was on a voyage from Gothenburg, Sweden to Liverpool, Lancashire.
Jane	United Kingdom	The ship was driven ashore and wrecked at Sunderland. She was refloated on 16 January and towed in to Sunderland.
Jane Maria	United Kingdom	The ship was driven ashore at Sunderland.
Jessie	United Kingdom	The ship was driven ashore at Middleton. Her crew were rescued.
Jessy	United Kingdom	The ship was driven ashore and wrecked at Hartlepool.
Jeune Arthur Achsah	United Kingdom	The brig was driven ashore at Stranton, County Durham. She was refloated on 28 January and taken in to Hartlepool.
Johanna	Sweden	The ship was driven ashore and damaged at Great Yarmouth. She was refloated and taken in to Great Yarmouth.
John Murray	United Kingdom	The schooner was driven ashore and severely damaged at Sunderland. Her crew were rescued by the Sunderland Lifeboat. She was refloated on 15 January and towed in to Sunderland.
Joiner	United Kingdom	The ship was driven ashore at Hartlepool.
Jonge Heinrich	Danzig	The ship was driven ashore in Mill Bay, Essex. She was on a voyage from Danzig to Nantes, Loire-Inférieure, France. She was later refloated and taken in to Harwich in a leaky condition.
Kate	United Kingdom	The ship was driven ashore at Sunderland.
Liberty	United Kingdom	The schooner was driven ashore and severely damaged at the Mumbles. She was on a voyage from Falmouth, Cornwall to Swansea She was refloated on 13 January and taken in to Swansea.
London	United Kingdom	The Banff-registered ship was driven ashore at Middleton. Her crew were rescued.
London	United Kingdom	The London-registered ship was damaged at Hartlepool. Her crew were rescued.
Louise	United Kingdom	The ship was driven ashore and severely damaged at Dover, Kent.
Maria	(United Kingdom of Great Britain and Ireland) British North America	The ship was driven ashore and wrecked at Sunderland. Her crew were rescued. She was on a voyage from Bridport, Dorset to Sunderland. She was refloated on 16 January and taken in to Sunderland in a severely damaged condition.
Maria	United Kingdom	The ship was driven ashore at Middleton. Her crew were rescued. She was on a voyage from Hastings, Sussex to Seaham, County Durham. She was refloated on 16 January and taken in to Hartlepool.
Maria	United Kingdom	The brig was driven ashore at Stranton.
Maria	Sweden	The brig was driven ashore at Hartlepool.
Maria	United Kingdom	The schooner was driven ashore and wrecked at Hartlepool.
Mary	United Kingdom	The brig was driven ashore and wrecked at Hartlepool. Her crew were rescued. She was on a voyage from Hartlepool to Weymouth, Dorset.
Mary	United Kingdom	The ship was driven ashore at Sunderland.
Mary and Jane	United Kingdom	The ship was driven ashore at Sunderland.
Mary Ann	United Kingdom	The ship was driven ashore and wrecked at Sunderland.
Mary Ann	United Kingdom	The brig was driven ashore at Whitby. Her crew were rescued. She was on a voyage from London to Whitby. She was refloated on 16 January and taken in to Whitby.
Mary Clark	United Kingdom	The brig was driven ashore at Sunderland.
Marys	United Kingdom	The ship was driven ashore at Upgang, Whitby. Her crew were rescued. She was on a voyage from Hartlepool to London.
Matthew	United Kingdom	The ship was driven ashore at Sunderland.
Matty	United Kingdom	The schooner was driven ashore at West Hartlepool.
Medina	United Kingdom	The collier, a brig, was driven ashore and severely damaged at Sunderland. Her crew were rescued by the North Sunderland lifeboat.
Mentor	Bremen	The ship was driven ashore on the Tendra Spit, Russia.
Merchant	United Kingdom	The ship was driven ashore at Middleton. Her crew were rescued.
Merrington	United Kingdom	The ship was driven ashore at Sunderland.
Minerva	United Kingdom	The ship capsized off Wells-next-the-Sea, Norfolk with the loss of all four crew. The wreck drove ashore at Thornham, Norfolk the next day.
Monarch	(United Kingdom of Great Britain and Ireland) Guernsey	The barque was driven ashore and wrecked near Warkworth. Her crew were rescued.
Nelson	United Kingdom	The ship was damaged at Hartlepool.
Nero	United Kingdom	The schooner was driven ashore and damaged at Tynemouth. She was on a voyage from South Shields to London.
New Messenger	United Kingdom	The ship ran aground and was wrecked on the Black Middens. Her crew were rescued by rocket apparatus.
Oak	United Kingdom	The ship was driven ashore at Middleton. Her crew were rescued. She was refloated on 16 January and taken in to Hartlepool.
Ora	Netherlands	The ship capsized at Vlissingen, Zeeland.
Pilot	United Kingdom	The ship was driven ashore and severely damaged at Sunderland. She was refloated on 15 January and towed in to Sunderland.
Plover	United Kingdom	The brig was driven ashore at Sunderland.
Princess Victoria	United Kingdom	The ship was damaged at South Shields.
Providence	United Kingdom	The brig was driven ashore and wrecked at Hartlepool. Her crew were rescued.
Rainbow	United Kingdom	The ship was driven ashore and wrecked at Middleton. Her crew were rescued.
Ranger	United Kingdom	The ship was driven ashore and wrecked at Bridlington. She was on a voyage from Hartlepool to Southampton, Hampshire.
Reata	France	The ship was driven ashore at Middleton. Her crew were rescued.
Rebecca and Elizabeth	United Kingdom	The sloop was driven ashore and wrecked at Hartlepool. Her crew were rescued.
Richard Carnell	United Kingdom	The ship was driven against the quayside at Portsmouth, Hampshire and was scuttled. She was later refloated and placed under repair.
Robert and Margaret	United Kingdom	The brig was driven ashore at Sunderland.
Rothusia	United Kingdom	The ship was driven ashore and wrecked at Tynemouth Her crew were rescued.
San Francisco	Kingdom of the Two Sicilies	The ship was driven ashore and wrecked at Sunderland. Her fourteen crew were rescued.
Sarah and Ann	United Kingdom	The brig was driven ashore and sank at Hartlepool. Her crew were rescued by the Hartlepool Lifeboat. She was refloated on 18 February and taken in to Hartlepool.
Sarah Jane	United Kingdom	The ship ran aground at Hartlepool. Her crew were rescued by the Hartlepool Lifeboat.
Sceptre	United Kingdom	The brig was driven ashore at Seaton Carew. Her crew were rescued. She was on a voyage from London to Middlesbrough, Yorkshire.
Science	(United Kingdom of Great Britain and Ireland) Guernsey	The brig was driven ashore and sank at Warkworth. Her crew were rescued. She was refloated on 20 February and taken in to Warkworth.
Sir Alexander McKenzie	United Kingdom	The brig was driven ashore at Lowestoft, Suffolk. Her crew were rescued. She was on a voyage from London to South Shields.
Sir George Telemachus	United Kingdom	The ship was driven ashore near Warkworth. Her crew were rescued.
Sir Robert Peel	United Kingdom	The barque ran aground and was wrecked on the Black Middens reef off Tynemouth. Her crew were rescued by rocket apparatus. She was on a voyage from Arica (then Peru) and Valparaíso to the River Tyne, with saltpetre.
St. George	(United Kingdom of Great Britain and Ireland) Guernsey	The brig was driven ashore near Warkworth. Her crew were rescued.
Teesdale	United Kingdom	The brig capsized off Hartlepool. Her crew were rescued by the Hartlepool Lifeboat. She was on a voyage from Stockton-on-Tees, County Durham to London. She was later refloated and beached at Middleton. She was refloated on 13 January and towed into the River Tees.
Theresa	United Kingdom	The brig was driven ashore at Sunderland.
Thomas and Edward	United Kingdom	The ship was driven ashore and severely damaged at Dover.
Treasurer	United Kingdom	The ship was driven ashore at Tynemouth.
Victor	United Kingdom	The ship was driven ashore at Hartlepool. Her crew were rescued. She was refloated on 19 January and taken in to Hartlepool.
Vigilant	United Kingdom	The ship foundered in the North Sea off Cromer, Norfolk with the loss of all hands.
Waverley	United Kingdom	The ship was damaged at Hartlepool.
William Packet	United Kingdom	The brig was driven ashore at Sunderland.
Woodbridge	United Kingdom	The ship was driven ashore and wrecked at Hartlepool. Her crew were rescued by the Hartlepool Lifeboat.
Woodfield	United Kingdom	The brig was driven ashore and wrecked at West Hartlepool, County Durham. Her crew were rescued by the Hartlepool Lifeboat.
Zeliah	United Kingdom	The ship was driven ashore and severely damaged at Sunderland.

== 5 January ==
List of shipwrecks: 5 January 1854
Ship	State	Description
Corona	United Kingdom	The ship ran aground at South Shields, County Durham. She was on a voyage from Hartlepool, County Durham to London. She was refloated with the assistance of two tugs and taken in to South Shields.
Cygnet	United Kingdom	The ship ran aground on the Herd Sand, in the North Sea off the coast of County Durham.
Empire City	United States	The steamship ran aground on the Barnegat Reef, off the coast of New Jersey. She was on a voyage from Havana, Cuba to New York. She was refloated on 7 January and towed in to New York.
Jane	United Kingdom	The schooner was wrecked on the Long Rock, off Ballywalter, County Down. Her crew were rescued. She was on a voyage from Ayr to Newport, Monmouthshire.
Ozack	United States	The ship was abandoned in the Atlantic Ocean. Her crew were rescued by Tuscarora (United States). Ozark was on a voyage from Wilmington, Delaware to Boston, Massachusetts.
Pacific	United Kingdom	The ship ran aground as South Shields. She was on a voyage from Catania, Sicily to South Shields. She was refloated and taken in to South Shields.
Quiz	(United Kingdom of Great Britain and Ireland) Jersey	The ship was driven ashore and severely damaged at Livorno, Grand Duchy of Tuscany.
San Francisco	United States	The troopship foundered in the Atlantic Ocean with the loss of more than 250 lives. The full-rigged ship Antarctic (United States) rescued 197 people. The barque Kilby United Kingdom rescued about 108 people, and the full-rigged ship Three Bells (United States) rescued more than 200 people. San Francisco was on a voyage from New York to San Francisco, California.
Scipio	United Kingdom	The brig was driven ashore between Scotstown Head and Rattray Head, Aberdeenshire. Her crew were rescued. She was on a voyage from Littlehampton, Sussex to Sunderland, County Durham.
Tecla Josephine	Sweden	The ship was wrecked at Gallipoli, Ottoman Empire. She was on a voyage from Odesa to Falmouth, Cornwall or Queenstown, County Cork, United Kingdom.
Victoria	United Kingdom	The schooner was wrecked in the Rogerstone Estuary with the loss of all hands. She was on a voyage from Liverpool, Lancashire to Wexford.
Yorkshireman	United Kingdom	The paddle steamer was driven ashore and wrecked at Ballywilliam Point, north of Donaghadee, County Down. All on board were rescued. She was on a voyage from Morecambe, Lancashire to Belfast, County Antrim. The ship broke in two. The aft section was salvaged and rebuilt as Waterloo.

== 6 January ==
List of shipwrecks: 6 January 1854
Ship	State	Description
Alexander Campbell	United Kingdom	The brig struck the Ox Carr Rocks, off the coast of Lothian and sank. Her crew were rescued. She was on a voyage from London to South Shields, County Durham.
Athens	United Kingdom	The ship ran aground on the Nantucket Shoals, in the Atlantic Ocean off the coast of Massachusetts, United States. She was on a voyage from New York, United States to Liverpool, Lancashire. She was refloated on 9 January and taken in to Sandy Point, Massachusetts.
Blandon	United Kingdom	The ship was driven ashore at Holyhead, Anglesey.
Dewdrop	United Kingdom	The brig was driven ashore and wrecked at Arbroath, Forfarshire with the loss of a crew member. Survivors were rescued by rocket apparatus. She was on a voyage from Hartlepool, County Durham to London.
Dowthorp	United Kingdom	The brig was wrecked off "Krossederesi", Ottoman Empire, Her crew were rescued.
Edward and Margaret	United Kingdom	The schooner was wrecked on the North Bull, in the Irish Sea off the coast of County Dublin. Her crew survived. She was on a voyage from Cardiff, Glamorgan to Ulverston, Lancashire.
Ellen	United Kingdom	The brig was driven ashore and severely damaged at Lindisfarne, Northumberland. Her crew were rescued.
Fishers	United Kingdom	The ship was wrecked on the Gaa Bank, at the mouth of the River Tay. Two people were rescued. She was on a voyage from Charlestown, Cornwall to Dundee, Forfarshire.
Finance	United Kingdom	The brig was driven ashore and wrecked at "Seagreens", Forfarshire, (8 nautical miles (15 km) north of Montrose, Forfarshire). Her crew were rescued. She was on a voyage from London to Montrose.
Helen	United Kingdom	The brig was driven ashore at Ross, Northumberland. Her crew were rescued.
James	United Kingdom	The ship was driven ashore and sank at Holyhead.
Lady Campbell	United Kingdom	The brig was driven ashore 2 nautical miles (3.7 km) west of Grimsby, Lincolnshire. She was on a voyage from Hull, Yorkshire to Seaham, County Durham. She was refloated on 15 January and taken in to Grimsby.
Lancaster	United Kingdom	The schooner was driven ashore at Ross, Northumberland with the loss of a crew member. She was on a voyage from Newcastle upon Tyne, Northumberland to London. She was refloated on 26 January and taken in to Lindsifarne, Northumberland in a severely damaged condition. Subsequently taken in to Warkworth, Northumberland for repairs.
Laurel	United Kingdom	The brig caught fire and sank off Inchkeith. Her crew were rescued.
Leadbitter	United Kingdom	The brig was driven ashore 2 nautical miles (3.7 km) west of Grimsby. She was on a voyage from Hull to Sunderland, County Durham. She was refloated on 15 January and resumed her voyage.
Mermaid	United Kingdom	The ship was driven ashore and wrecked in the Copeland Islands, County Down. Her crew were rescued. She was on a voyage from Liverpool, Lancashire to Philadelphia, Pennsylvania.
Minerva	United Kingdom	The schooner was driven ashore and wrecked at Tynemouth, Northumberland with the loss of all hands. She was on a voyage from the River Tyne to London.
Mould	United Kingdom	The ship foundered in the North Sea off the coast of Aberdeenshire with the loss of all hands.
Prince of Wales	United Kingdom	The Yorkshire Billyboy ran aground on the Barrows Sand, in the North Sea off the coast of Essex. She was refloated with the assistance of several smacks and taken in to Brightlingsea.
Sir Robert Peel	Norway	The brig was in collision with the steamship Adonis in the Thames Estuary and was severely damaged. Six of her crew got aboard Adonis. Sir Robert Peel put back to Limehouse, Middlesex, United Kingdom.
Tweedside	United Kingdom	The schooner was wrecked on the Blacktail Sand, in the Thames Estuary. Her crew were rescued. She was on a voyage from Montrose, Forfarshire to Chichester, Sussex.
Zephyr	United Kingdom	The brig was destroyed by fire at Leith, Lothian. She was on a voyage from Hartlepool, County Durham to London. Her crew were rescued.

== 7 January ==
List of shipwrecks: 7 January 1854
Ship	State	Description
Albean	United Kingdom	The ship was driven ashore at Cape Henry, Virginia, United States. She was on a voyage from Bristol, Gloucestershire to Norfolk, Virginia, United States.
Cambodia	United Kingdom	The full-rigged ship foundered in the Pacific Ocean 600 nautical miles (1,100 km) off Callao, Peru. Her crew survived. She was on a voyage from Callao to England.
Commerce	United Kingdom	The schooner was driven ashore at Ladyloan railway station, Forfarshire. Her five crew were rescued. She was on a voyage from Danzig to Aberdour, Fife.
Embla	Norway	The ship foundered in the North Sea off the coast of Northumberland, United Kingdom with the loss of all thirteen crew. She was on a voyage from St. Ubes, Portugal to Stavanger.
Généreuse, or Jeune Rose	France	The brigantine capsized in the English Channel off Lyme Regis, Dorset, United Kingdom. Her crew were rescued by the Lyme Regis Lifeboat but a Coast Guard officer was drowned. She was on a voyage from Libourne, Gironde to Dunkirk, Nord. The wreck subsequently came ashore at Charmouth, Dorset and was plundered by the local inhabitants.
Halcyon	United Kingdom	The brig was driven ashore and wrecked at the mouth of the River Ythan. Her crew were presumed to have drowned.
Johan Augusta	Sweden	The schooner was driven ashore at Aberdeen, United Kingdom. Her five crew were rescued by the Aberdeen Lifeboat. She was on a voyage from Strömstad to Aberdeen. She was refloated on 21 January and taken in to Aberdeen .
Leonora	United Kingdom	The ship ran aground on the Middle Sand, in the Thames Estuary. She was on a voyage from Guernsey, Channel Islands to London. She was refloated and taken in to Gravesend, Kent.
Mary Elizabeth	United Kingdom	The ship was driven ashore at Dundalk, County Louth. She was on a voyage from Pembrey, Carmarthenshire to Kingstown, County Dublin. She capsized on 17 January and was severely damaged.
Mermaid	United States	The ship was wrecked in the Copeland Islands, County Down, United Kingdom. Her crew were rescued.
Rothschild	United Kingdom	The ship was abandoned in the Atlantic Ocean 50 nautical miles (93 km) north west of Madeira. She was on a voyage from Liverpool to Mobile, Alabama, United States.
Thomas Miller	United Kingdom	The ship was driven ashore on the North Bull, in the Irish Sea off the coast of County Dublin. Her crew were rescued. She was on a voyage from Liverpool, Lancashire to South Shields, County Durham.

== 8 January ==
List of shipwrecks: 8 January 1854
Ship	State	Description
Armada	Stettin	The brig was driven ashore and wrecked at South Shields, County Durham, United Kingdom. Her crew were rescued.
Auguste	France	The brig was driven ashore and wrecked at Ryhope, County Durham.
Everhardus	Netherlands	The galliot foundered off Rattray Head, Aberdeenshire, United Kingdom with the loss of all hands.
Galatea	(United Kingdom of Great Britain and Ireland) Guernsey	The ship was driven ashore at Shoreham-by-Sea, Sussex. She was on a voyage from Guernsey to London.
George	United Kingdom	The ship was driven ashore at South Shields. Her crew were rescued. She was refloated on 16 January.
Jean	United Kingdom	The schooner was wrecked on the Herd Sand, in the North Sea off the coast of County Durham.
Joven Venturoso	Spain	The ship was wrecked on the coast of Vendée, France. She was on a voyage from Bilbao to Nantes, Loire-Inférieure.
Lamberts	Netherlands	The ship was driven ashore at Belhelvie, Aberdeenshire, United Kingdom with the loss of all hands.
Traveller	United Kingdom	The brig was driven ashore at Ryhope.

== 9 January ==
List of shipwrecks: 9 January 1854
Ship	State	Description
Ann	United Kingdom	The brig ran aground and was wrecked on the Herd Sand, in the North Sea off the coast of County Durham.
Bonne Virginie	France	The schooner ran aground on the Herd Sand. She was refloated on 23 January and taken in to South Shields, County Durham.
Breakwater	United Kingdom	The collier ran aground and was severely damaged on the Herd Sand. She was refloated on 16 January.
Carl	Sweden	The schooner was driven ashore at Aberdeen, United Kingdom. Her nine crew were rescued by rocket apparatus. She was on a voyage from Lisbon, Portugal to Gothenburg. She subsequently became a wreck.
Conference	United Kingdom	The collier ran aground on the Herd Sand. She was refloated on 16 January and teaken in to South shields for repairs.
Cresswell	United Kingdom	The schooner ran aground and was wrecked on the Herd Sand. Her crew were rescued.
Domestic	United Kingdom	The schooner ran aground on a reef off the Blasket Islands and was abandoned. Her crew were rescued. She was on a voyage from Sicily to the Clyde.
Elbina	United Kingdom	The derelict ship was driven ashore at Spurn Point, Yorkshire.
Emilie	Flag unknown	The schooner foundered in the North Sea off Blyth, Northumberland, United Kingdom.
Hercules	United Kingdom	The schooner was driven ashore and wrecked at North Berwick, Lothian. Her crew were rescued. She was on a voyage from Aldeburgh, Suffolk to Newcastle upon Tyne, Northumberland.
Inverness	United Kingdom	The schooner struck the pier and sank at South Shields.
James and Ann	United Kingdom	The schooner ran aground and was wrecked on the Herd Sand. Her crew were rescued.
Jane	United Kingdom	The brig ran aground on the Herd Sand.
Jane and Margaret	United Kingdom	The ship ran aground on the Herd Sand.
Jules	Norway	The ship ran aground on the Herd Sand. She was refloated in late January and taken in to South Shields.
Milton	United Kingdom	The brig ran aground on Duncan's Reef, off Chebucto Head, Nova Scotia, British North America and was abandoned by her crew. She was on a voyage from Halifax, Nova Scotia to Liverpool, Lancashire. She was refloated by some fishermen and taken in to Ketch Harbour, Nova Scotia.
Mountaineer	United Kingdom	The ship ran aground on the Herd Sand.
Samuel	United Kingdom	The Yorkshire Billyboy was driven ashore at Sunderland, County Durham. Her crew were rescued. She was on a voyage from London to Sunderland. She was refloated on 16 January.
Sarah Milridge	United Kingdom	The barque ran aground on the Herd Sand. f
Sir Bouchier	United Kingdom	The ship was abandoned in the Mediterranean Sea. Her crew took to two boats, one of which reached Sciacca, Sicily on 12 January with five crew on board. The other capsized with the loss of two lives She was on a voyage from Trieste to Malta and Liverpool, Lancashire.
Walhalla	Duchy of Holstein	The barque was driven ashore at Spittal Point, Northumberland. Her crew were rescued. She was on a voyage from London to South Shields. She was refloated on 14 January and taken in to Berwick upon Tweed, Northumberland.
Zephyr	Norway	The brig was driven ashore and wrecked north of Berwick upon Tweed with the loss of four of her ten crew. She was on a voyage from London to South Shields. She was refloated on 26 January.

== 10 January ==
List of shipwrecks: 10 January 1854
Ship	State	Description
Albion	United Kingdom	The ship was damaged by ice and sank at Wisbech, Cambridgeshire.
Boadicea	United Kingdom	The ship was driven ashore and wrecked at South Shields before 11 January. She was on a voyage from Teignmouth, Devon to Newcastle upon Tyne, Northumberland.
Dankbaar	Prussia	The brig was driven ashore at Ryhope, County Durham, United Kingdom. Her crew were rescued. She was on a voyage from London to Newcastle upon Tyne.
Edward Brandt	Flag unknown	The ship was wrecked at Thisted, Denmark.
Eurata	United Kingdom	The ship was wrecked on the Herd Sand, in the North Sea off the coast of County Durham.
Happy Return	United Kingdom	The schooner ran aground on the Herd Sand. She was on a voyage from London to Newcastle upon Tyne. She was refloated on 16 January and taken in to South Shields.
Junius	Norway	The ship ran aground and was wrecked on the Herd Sand. She was refloated on 21 January and taken in to South Shields.
Lively	United Kingdom	The collier ran aground on the Herd Sand. She was refloated on 17 January.
Lydia	United Kingdom	The ship was driven ashore at Whitby, Yorkshire. She was refloated the next day.
Niobe	United Kingdom	The ship ran aground at Hartlepool.
Ocean	United Kingdom	The Yorkshire Billyboy ran aground on the Herd Sand. She was refloated on 12 January.
Savannah	United Kingdom	The schooner ran aground and was damaged on the Herd Sand. She was on a voyage from London to Cádiz, Spain. Savannah was later refloated.
Viola	United Kingdom	The brig ran aground on a sunken brig and was beached at Hartlepool. She was on a voyage from Hull, Yorkshire to Hartlepool. She was refloated with the assistance of two tugs and taken in to Hartlepool.

== 11 January ==
List of shipwrecks: 11 January 1854
Ship	State	Description
Albania	United States	The ship was driven ashore at Cape Henry, Virginia. She was on a voyage from Bristol, Gloucestershire, United Kingdom to Boston, Massachusetts.
Amelia	United Kingdom	The ship sprang a leak and was beached 3 leagues (9 nautical miles (17 km)) south of Porto, Portugal, where she was wrecked with the loss of a crew member. She was on a voyage from Cartagena, Spain to Newcastle upon Tyne, Northumberland.
Catherine Maria	Denmark	The ship was driven ashore and wrecked in Druridge Bay with the loss of all hands. A Newfoundland dog survived.
Charlotte	United Kingdom	The ship was driven ashore and wrecked near Charleston, South Carolina, United States. Her crew were rescued. She was on a voyage from Halifax, Nova Scotia, British North America to Charleston.
Eclipse	(United Kingdom of Great Britain and Ireland) New South Wales	The brig was wrecked at the mouth of the Richmond River.
Effort	United Kingdom	The ship ran aground off Oyster Island, County Sligo. She was on a voyage from Sligo to London. She was later refloated.
Luna	United Kingdom	The brig ran aground on the West Rocks, in the North Sea off the coast of Essex and was abandoned by her crew. She was later refloated and taken in to Wivenhoe, Essex.
Montezuma	Kingdom of Naples	The brig was wrecked near Boulmer, Northumberland, United Kingdom. Her crew were rescued. She was on a voyage from Agrigento to Newcastle upon Tyne.
Pearea	Norway	The ship was driven ashore and wrecked at West Hartlepool, County Durham, United Kingdom. Her crew were rescued. She was on a voyage from Norway to London, United Kingdom.
Pehr Holmburg	Flag unknown	The schooner was driven ashore at Clee Ness, Lincolnshire, United Kingdom. She was on a voyage from Grimsby, Lincolnshire to London.
Spray	United Kingdom	The schooner was driven ashore and severely damaged at Hartlepool, County Durham.
Thomas Gleadow	United Kingdom	The ship was driven ashore and wrecked at Lisbon, Portugal. Her crew were rescued. She was on a voyage from Brǎila, Ottoman Empire to an English port.
Volo	United Kingdom	The ship ran aground off Inchcolm. She was on a voyage from Leith, Lothian to Matanzas, Cuba. She was refloated and put back to Leith.

== 12 January ==
List of shipwrecks: 12 January 1854
Ship	State	Description
Chauncey Jerome Junior	United States	During a voyage from Liverpool, Lancashire, United Kingdom, to New York City, the 1,154-ton sailing ship was driven ashore at Long Branch, New Jersey. All on board were rescued. Her wreck sank in 20 feet (6 m) of water.
Derby	United Kingdom	The ship was wrecked near "Mohalitch", Ottoman Empire. Her crew were rescued. She was on a voyage from Odesa to an English port.
Diadem	United Kingdom	The ship was driven ashore and wrecked at Aldbrough, Yorkshire.
Ligeira	Belgium	The ship was driven ashore at Jersey, Channel Islands. She was on a voyage from Bahia, Brazil to Antwerp. She was refloated and taken in to Jersey where she capsized. She was righted on 14 January.
Salisbury	United States	The brig was driven ashore near Scituate, Massachusetts. She was on a voyage from London, United Kingdom to Boston, Massachusetts. She was refloated the next day and towed in to Boston.
Welcome	United Kingdom	The brig sprang a leak and was beached at Charlestown, Fife. She was on a voyage from Sunderland, County Durham to London.
William Tell	United States	The ship ran aground at Havre de Grâce, Seine-Inférieur, France. She was on a voyage from New York to Havre de Grâce. She was refloated and taken in to Havre de Grâce.

== 13 January ==
List of shipwrecks: 13 January 1854
Ship	State	Description
Chester	United Kingdom	The schooner was driven ashore and wrecked at Newquay, Cornwall. She was on a voyage from Cardiff, Glamorgan to Newquay.
Eleanora	United Kingdom	The brig was driven ashore and wrecked at Cranberry Head, Nova Scotia, British North America. She was on a voyage from New York, United States to Halifax, Nova Scotia.
Gem	United Kingdom	The ship was driven ashore at Castle Eden Dene, County Durham. Sh was on a voyage from London to Sunderland, County Durham.
Helen and Sophia	United Kingdom	The schooner was driven ashore at "Perrey", Seine-Inférieure, France. She was on a voyage from South Shields to Havre de Grâce, Seine-Inférieure. Although condemned, she was refloated on 16 January and taken in to Havre de Grâce.
Knaresborough Castle	United Kingdom	The ship was driven ashore at Black Halls, County Durham. She was on a voyage from Ipswich, Suffolk to Seaham, County Durham.
Robert and Louise	Hamburg	The ship was driven ashore in the Scheldt at Doel, East Flanders, Belgium. She was on a voyage from Iquique to Antwerp, Belgium.
Susan G. Owens	United States	The ship driven ashore at Charleston, South Carolina. She was refloated and taken in to Charleston.
Trusty	United Kingdom	The ship was abandoned off Ballantrae, Ayrshire. Her crew were rescued.

== 14 January ==
List of shipwrecks: 14 January 1854
Ship	State	Description
Acadian	United Kingdom	The brig was run into by another vessel and was consequently beached at Newport, Nova Scotia, British North America. She was on a voyage from Windsor, Nova Scotia to New York, United States.
Coquette	(United Kingdom of Great Britain and Ireland) Bermuda	The brig was lost in the Atlantic Ocean. She was on a voyage from Baltimore, Maryland, United States to the West Indies.
Elizabeth Bruce	United Kingdom	The ship ran aground near the Carysfort Reef Lighthouse, Florida, United States. She was on a voyage from Liverpool, Lancashire to Mobile, Alabama, United States. She became a wreck on 16 January.
Grafton	United Kingdom	The ship was lost in Liverpool Bay. Her crew survived. She was on a voyage from Liverpool, Lancashire to New York.
Martin	Danzig	The ship was driven ashore near Helsingør, Denmark. She was on a voyage from Danzig to Liverpool, Lancashire, United Kingdom. She was refloated the next day and taken in to Helsingør in a leaky condition.
St. Germain	France	The brig was driven ashore on the coast of Sicily. She was on a voyage from "Carlaforte", Sicily to an English port.

== 15 January ==
List of shipwrecks: 15 January 1854
Ship	State	Description
Indus	United Kingdom	The barque ran aground on the Goodwin Sands, Kent. She was refloated the next day and towed in to Ramsgate, Kent in a leaky condition.
James and Thomas	United Kingdom	The sloop was driven ashore at Peterhead, Aberdeenshire. She floated off and sank. Her crew were rescued. She was on a voyage from the Firth of Forth to Peterhead.
Reina	Netherlands	The ship was wrecked off Vlieland, Friesland. Her crew were rescued. She was on a voyage from Riga, Russia to Belfast, County Antrim, United Kingdom.

== 16 January ==
List of shipwrecks: 16 January 1854
Ship	State	Description
Amelia	United Kingdom	The ship was driven ashore at "Claughton Wyke", Yorkshire. She was on a voyage from South Shields, County Durham to Havre de Grâce, Seine-Inférieure, France. She was refloated the next day with the assistance of two cobles and put back to South Shields.
Evening Star	United Kingdom	The ship was driven ashore at Liverpool, Lancashire. She was on a voyage from Portland, Dorset to Liverpool.
Margaretha	United Kingdom	The smack ran aground off Yarmouth, Isle of Wight. She was on a voyage from Waterford, to Portsmouth, Hampshire. She was refloated.
Pioneer	United Kingdom	The ship was driven ashore on Saltholm, Denmark. She was on a voyage from Memel, Prussia to Grangemouth, Stirlingshire. She was refloated on 18 January and taken in to Helsingør, Denmark for repairs.
Verheyden	Hamburg	The ship foundered in the Pacific Ocean (39°40′S 145°10′W). All hands presumed lost. A message in a bottle was washed up at Melbourne, Victoria in October giving the vessel's location and stating that she was sinking.

== 17 January ==
List of shipwrecks: 17 January 1854
Ship	State	Description
Æneas	United Kingdom	The ship sprang a leak and was beached at Dungarvan, County Waterford. She was on a voyage from Newport, Monmouthshire to Cork.
Boston	United States	The brig was driven ashore at Providence, Rhode Island.
Diana	United Kingdom	The schooner sank in Liverpool Bay off the Formby Lighthouse. Her crew were rescued. She was on a voyage from Charlestown, Cornwall to Liverpool, Lancashire.
Earl of Aberdeen	United Kingdom	The ship struck rocks at Tynemouth, Northumberland and was damaged. She was refloated and taken in to South Shields, County Durham.
Jarius Hart	United Kingdom	The schooner was driven ashore at Race Point, Massachusetts, United States. She was refloated and taken in to Provincetown, Massachusetts.
Jenny Lind	(United Kingdom of Great Britain and Ireland) Jersey	The ship was abandoned in the Atlantic Ocean. Her crew were rescued by St. John (United Kingdom). Jenny Lind was on a voyage from Laguna to Liverpool.
Jessie Cook	United Kingdom	The ship collided with the tug Arran Castle (United Kingdom and sank in the River Liffey. She was on a voyage from Bangor, Caernarfonshire to Dublin.
Joblings	United Kingdom	The ship ran aground at South Shields. She was refloated.
Johann Georg	Denmark	The schooner was run into by the brig Stirling (United Kingdom) and sank at Charlestown, Fife, United Kingdom. Her crew were rescued.
John O'Gaunt	United Kingdom	The ship was driven ashore and wrecked at Holyhead, Anglesey. Her crew were rescued. She was on a voyage from Whampoa, China to Liverpool, Lancashire.
Marie Thérése	Belgium	The ship was driven ashore in the Scheldt at Saftingen, East Flanders. She was on a voyage from Havana, Cuba to Antwerp.
Pioneer	United Kingdom	The lugger was wrecked in Loch Boisdale. Her crew were rescued. She was on a voyage from Stornoway, Isle of Lewis, Outer Hebrides to Liverpool.

== 18 January ==
List of shipwrecks: 18 January 1854
Ship	State	Description
Cecilie	Denmark	The schooner was driven ashore and wrecked on Skagen. Her crew were rescued. She was on a voyage from Newcastle upon Tyne, Northumberland, United Kingdom to Odense.
Don Affonso	Portugal	The ship was wrecked near Avola, Sicily. She was on a voyage from Odesa to Falmouth, Cornwall, United Kingdom.
Espindola	United States	The ship was driven ashore and wrecked in the Scheldt at Saftingen, East Flanders, Belgium. She was on a voyage from New York to Antwerp, Belgium.
Gardiner	United Kingdom	The ship was driven ashore at Blyth, Northumberland. She was on a voyage from Shediac, New Brunswick, British North America to South Shields, County Durham. She was refloated on 22 January and taken in to South Shields in a waterlogged condition.
Gem	United Kingdom	The brig ran aground on the Sow and Pigs Rocks. She was on a voyage from London to Sunderland, County Durham. She was refloated and resumed her voyage.
James Calder	United Kingdom	The ship was driven ashore at Ballyteague, County Kildare. Her crew were rescued. She was on a voyage from New Orleans, Louisiana, United States to Liverpool, Lancashire. She broke up the next day.
Jeune Marie	France	The ship was driven ashore at Town Point, in Carmarthen Bay. Her crew were rescued. She was on a voyage from Brest, Finistère to Llanelly, Glamorgan, United Kingdom.
Mutual	United Kingdom	The ship ran aground on the North Gar Sand, in the North Sea off the mouth of the River Tees. She was refloated the next day with assistance from the steamship Star (United Kingdom).
Secret	United Kingdom	The barque ran aground and was wrecked on the North Tail, off Appledore, Devon. Her crew survived. She was on a voyage from Newport, Monmouthshire to New York, United States.
Tancred	United Kingdom	The barque struck the Arklow Bank, in the Irish Sea off the coast of County Wicklow and was abandoned by her fifteen crew. She was on a voyage from Liverpool to Smyrna, Ottoman Empire. Tancred was wrecked on the Arklow Bank the next day.

== 19 January ==
List of shipwrecks: 19 January 1854
Ship	State	Description
American Lass	(United Kingdom of Great Britain and Ireland) British North America	The ship departed from Saint John's, Newfoundland for Porto, Portugal. No further trace, presumed foundered with the loss of all hands.
John Reid	United Kingdom	The schooner was in collision with the paddle steamer Ardincaple (United Kingdom) and was abandoned in the North Sea off Flamborough Head, Yorkshire. Her crew were rescued by Dove (United Kingdom) before she sank. John Reid was on a voyage from Seaham, County Durham to London.
Lady Stewart	United Kingdom	The brig was in collision with Ivenstone (United Kingdom) in the North Sea off the coast of County Durham. Six of her seven crew were rescued by Ivenstone. The seventh was rescued the next day. Lady Stewart was on a voyage from South Shields, County Durham to London.
Mason	United Kingdom	The schooner was driven ashore at Happisburgh, Norfolk. She was on a voyage from Leith, Lothian to London. She was refloated on 22 January and taken in to Great Yarmouth, Norfolk.
Scotland	United Kingdom	The ship ran aground on the Kish Bank, in the Irish Sea off the coast of County Dublin. She was on a voyage from Liverpool, Lancashire to Africa. She was refloated and subsequently drove ashore between Baldoyle and Portmarnock, County Dublin. Scotland was refloated the next day and taken in tow for Dublin, but drove ashore again.

== 20 January ==
List of shipwrecks: 20 January 1854
Ship	State	Description
Dos Adelaides	Spain	The brig was driven ashore at "Sickleskeep". She was refloated on 22 January and taken in to Key West, Florida, United States.
Exertion	United Kingdom	The schooner was driven ashore at Lowestoft, Suffolk. She was on a voyage from Newcastle upon Tyne, Northumberland to Lowestoft. She was refloated and taken in to Lowestoft.
Julie	Netherlands	The ship was driven ashore in the Scheldt. She was on a voyage from Padang, Netherlands East Indies to Hellevoetsluis, Zeeland.
Mabon	United Kingdom	The schooner was driven ashore at Happisburgh, Norfolk. She was on a voyage from Leith, Lothian to London. She was refloated and resumed her voyage.

== 21 January ==
List of shipwrecks: 21 January 1854
Ship	State	Description
Appleton	United Kingdom	The ship was run ashore at Waterford. She was on a voyage from Mauritius to Waterford. She was refloated and taken in to Waterford.
Argentina	Argentina	The tender ran aground on a reef and was abandoned. She was on a voyage from Montevideo, Uruguay to Buenos Ayres.
Arnold	Russia	The ship was wrecked at Marstrand, Sweden.
Catherine Flanagan	United Kingdom	The schooner was abandoned in Dundrum Bay and drove ashore.
Downs	United Kingdom	The brig was driven ashore in the River Suir.
Eliza Murray	United Kingdom	The ship was driven ashore at "Irecastle", Anglesey. She was on a voyage from Liverpool, Lancashire to Dublin.
Orion	United Kingdom	The ship ran aground on the Mixen Sand, in the English Channel. She was on a voyage from Havre de Grâce, Seine-Inférieure, France to Newport, Monmouthshire. She was refloated and taken in to Portsmouth, Hampshire.
Ranger	United Kingdom	The brig ran aground at Jarrow, County Durham. She was refloated.
Red Rover	United Kingdom	The flat was abandoned in the Irish Sea off Black Combe, Cumberland. Her crew were rescued by Mona's Queen ( (United Kingdom of Great Britain and Ireland) Isle of Man).
RMS Tayleur	United Kingdom	The passenger ship ran aground on Lambay Island, County Dublin, and sank with the loss of 362 of the 652 people on board. She was on her maiden voyage from Liverpool, Lancashire to Melbourne, Victoria.

== 23 January ==
List of shipwrecks: 23 January 1854
Ship	State	Description
Bona Dea	United Kingdom	The barque was wrecked in the Atlantic Ocean with the loss of ten of her crew. Eleven survivors were taken off the wreck at a location 20 nautical miles (37 km) south west of Mizen Head, County Cork on 4 February by the barque Cuba (United Kingdom). Bona Dea was on a voyage from Coquimbo, Chile to Swansea, Glamorgan.
Brothers	United Kingdom	The ship collided with Jane (United Kingdom) and sank. She was on a voyage from Bo'ness, Lothian to Newcastle upon Tyne, Northumberland.
Canadian	United Kingdom	The brig was driven ashore and wrecked at Aldeburgh, Suffolk. Her crew were rescued by the Aldeburgh Lifeboat.
Cecile	France	The barque was wrecked on the west coast of the Île d'Oléron, Charente-Inférieure with some loss of life. She was on a voyage from Veracruz, Mexico to Bordeaux, Gironde.
Christine	Norway	The ship was driven ashore and wrecked 2 nautical miles (3.7 km) south of Bergen. She was on a voyage from Odesa to Bergen.
Elizabeth Murray	United Kingdom	The schooner was driven ashore and wrecked at Tre-Castell, Anglesey.
Fairy	United Kingdom	The brig was driven ashore at South Foreland, Kent. She was on a voyage from Shoreham-by-Sea, Sussex to Newcastle upon Tyne. She was refloated and resumed her voyage.
Inverness, or Juverna	United Kingdom	The steamship was driven ashore at Ballycotton, County Cork.
Nomade	France	The brig ran aground off New Grimsby, Isles of Scilly, United Kingdom.
Titbit	United Kingdom	The schooner was driven ashore at Southport, Lancashire. She was on a voyage from Lisbon, Portugal to Liverpool, Lancashire. She was refloated on 26 January and towed in to Liverpool.

== 24 January ==
List of shipwrecks: 24 January 1854
Ship	State	Description
Anne	United Kingdom	The sloop was driven ashore crewless 3 nautical miles (5.6 km) east of Hastings, Sussex. She was a total loss.
Hebe	United Kingdom	The barque was wrecked on the Newcombe Sand, in the North Sea off the coast of Suffolk. Her crew were rescued. She was on a voyage from South Shields, County Durham to Lisbon, Portugal.
Industrie	Russia	The ship was driven ashore at Nakkehead, Denmark. She was on a voyage from Riga to Hull, Yorkshire, United Kingdom. She was refloated and takne in to Helsingør, Denmark.
Keitic	United Kingdom	The sloop ran aground on the Stone Bench, in the North Sea off the coast of Essex. She was on a voyage from London to Newcastle upon Tyne, Northumberland. She was refloated and taken in to Harwich, Essex in a severely leaky condition.
St. Johannes	Prussia	The barque was abandoned in the Atlantic Ocean. Her crew were rescued by Velocity (United Kingdom). St. Johannes was on a voyage from Valparaíso, Chile to Liverpool, Lancashire, United Kingdom.

== 25 January ==
List of shipwrecks: 25 January 1854
Ship	State	Description
Alfred Helouise	France	The ship was driven ashore 4 nautical miles (7.4 km) east of Rye, Sussex, United Kingdom. She was on a voyage from Havre de Grâce, Seine-Inférieure, France to Newcastle upon Tyne, Northumberland, United Kingdom.
Brothers	United Kingdom	The ship was driven ashore and wrecked in Ballydonegan Bay. Her crew were ashore.
Constitution	United Kingdom	The schooner sprang a leak and was beached at Kirkcaldy, Fife. Her crew were rescued. She was on a voyage from Newcastle upon Tyne to Leith, Lothian and Aberdeen.
Cumberland	United Kingdom	The barque was abandoned in the Atlantic Ocean (46°40′N 36°00′W). Her crew were rescued by the brigantine Amanda ( (United Kingdom of Great Britain and Ireland) British North America. Cumberland was on a voyage from Valparaíso, Chile to Liverpool, Lancashire.
Kron Prins Oscar	Norway	The ship was driven ashore on the "Heia Scheeren". She was on a voyage from London, United Kingdom to the Lange Sundfjord. She was refloated and put in to Asmalssund.
Luna	United Kingdom	The brig foundered off Luleå, Swedem.
Marco Polo	United Kingdom	The ship ran aground at Melbourne, Victoria. Her passengers were landed.
Petrel	United Kingdom	The steamship was destroyed by fire at Greenock, Renfrewshire.
Russia	United Kingdom	The brig was wrecked on the Gaff's Key Reef, off the coast of British Honduras. Her crew were rescued. She was on a voyage from Belize City to Liverpool.
Thetis	United Kingdom	The ship ran aground on the Blackshaw Bank, in the Irish Sea. She was on a voyage from Dublin to Maryport, Cumberland.
Thomas and Mary	United Kingdom	The ship was driven ashore 4 nautical miles (7.4 km) east of Rye. She was on a voyage from Rouen, Seine-Inférieure to Newcastle upon Tyne.

== 26 January ==
List of shipwrecks: 26 January 1854
Ship	State	Description
Bideford	United Kingdom	The ship was driven ashore and wrecked at Mazagan, Morocco.
Eliza	United Kingdom	The ship was driven ashore at St. Bees Head, Cumberland. She was on a voyage from Dublin to Whitehaven, Cumberland.
Emblem	United Kingdom	The ship was driven ashore and wrecked at Mazagan.
Flor da Primavera	Portugal	The ship was driven ashore and wrecked at Mazagan.
Isabella	United Kingdom	The brig was wrecked on the Stoney Binks, in the North Sea off the mouth of the Humber. Her crew were rescued. She was on a voyage from South Shields, County Durham to London.
John and Mary	United Kingdom	The ship was in collision with a brig and was abandoned in the North Sea. Her crew were rescued.
John H. Jarvis	United Kingdom	The ship ran aground at Whitehaven, Cumberland. She was on a voyage from New Orleans, Louisiana to Liverpool, Lancashire. She was refloated and towed to Liverpool.
Johns	United Kingdom	The ship ran aground at Lindisfarne, Northumberland. She was on a voyage from Kirkcaldy, Fife to Hartlepool, County Durham. She was refloated and resumed her voyage.
Lauriston	United Kingdom	The ship was destroyed by fire at Holyhead, Anglesey. She was on a voyage from Liverpool to Ancona, Papal States.
Mariner	United Kingdom	The ship was driven ashore and wrecked at Mazagan.
Olinda	United Kingdom	The steamship was wrecked off the coast of Anglesey. All on board were rescued. She was on a voyage from Liverpool to Rio de Janeiro, Brazil.
Regard	United Kingdom	The ship was lost near "Brinelisi". She was on a voyage from Trieste to a British port.
Rosa	Spain	The ship was driven ashore and wrecked at Mazagan.
Seahorse	(United Kingdom of Great Britain and Ireland) Gibraltar	The ship was driven ashore and wrecked at Mazagan.
St. John	Hamburg	The ship was driven ashore and wrecked at Mazagan.
Temi	Kingdom of Sardinia	The ship was driven ashore and wrecked at Mazagan.
Veloz	Spain	The ship was driven ashore and wrecked at Mazagan.

== 27 January ==
List of shipwrecks: 27 January 1854
Ship	State	Description
Alfecto	Portugal	The ship was wrecked on the Putoes Rocks. She was on a voyage from Viana do Castelo to Queenstown, County Cork, United Kingdom.
Charlotte	Sweden	The ship was driven ashore and wrecked near Rörö. Her crew were rescued. She was on a voyage from Lisbon, Portugal to Stockholm.
Ebenezer	United Kingdom	The sloop was abandoned in the North Sea. Her crew were rescued. She was on a voyage from Sunderland, County Durham to Milton Regis, Kent.
Ellen Boyd	United Kingdom	The ship ran aground near Cape St. Mary Portugal. She was on a voyage from Seville, Spain to Falmouth, Cornwall.
Fame	United Kingdom	The ship sprang a leak and was abandoned in the North Sea off the coast of Yorkshire. Her crew were rescued by a smack.
Frederike	Denmark	The ship was driven ashore and wrecked on Rödskär, Sweden with the loss of a crew member. She was on a voyage from Rio de Janeiro, Brazil to Copenhagen.
Gipsy	United Kingdom	The ship was driven ashore 5 nautical miles (9.3 km) east of Dunbar, Lothian. She was on a voyage from Arbroath, Forfarshire to Hartlepool, County Durham. She was refloated and taken in to Dunbar in a leaky condition.
Julius	Rostock	The ship was wrecked near Christiansand, Norway with the loss of two of her crew. She was on a voyage from London to Rostock.
Princess Charlotte	United Kingdom	The ship was abandoned in the Atlantic Ocean. Her crew were rescued. She was on a voyage from British Honduras to New York, United States and London.
Remke	Netherlands	The galiot ran aground on the Longsand, in the North Sea off the coast of Essex, United Kingdom. She floated off and was escorted in to Harwich, Essex by the smacks Atalanta and Eagle (both United Kingdom). Remke was on a voyage from Sunderland to Bordeaux, Gironde, France.
William H. Davies	United Kingdom	The ship was driven ashore and wrecked on Barra, Outer Hebrides with the loss of 23 of her 24 crew. She was on a voyage from Liverpool, Lancashire to New Orleans, Louisiana, United States.

== 28 January ==
List of shipwrecks: 28 January 1854
Ship	State	Description
Camillus	United Kingdom	The barque was driven ashore at Mahaicony, British Guiana. She was later refloated and taken in to Demerara, where she arrived on 3 February.
Ellen	(United Kingdom of Great Britain and Ireland) Isle of Man	The ship was driven ashore and wrecked at Whitehaven, Cumberland with the loss of two of her crew. She was on a voyage from Peel to Whitehaven.
Empire	United Kingdom	The ship was driven ashore on Governors Island, New York City. She was on a voyage from New York City to Liverpool, Lancashire. She was refloated.
Georgia	United States	The steamship was destroyed by fire at New Orleans, Louisiana with the loss of about 60 lives. She was on a voyage from Montgomery, Alabama to New Orleans.
Sea Queen	United Kingdom	The ship struck the pier at Ramsgate, Kent and was severely damaged. She was on a voyage from London to Hong Kong.
Thames	United Kingdom	The ship ran aground off Moulmein, Burma. SHe was on a voyage from London to Sydney, New South Wales.
Two Brothers	United Kingdom	The fishing smack was in collision with the steamship Antelope (United Kingdom and sank in the Humber. Her crew were rescued by Antelope.

== 29 January ==
List of shipwrecks: 29 January 1854
Ship	State	Description
Agenoria	United Kingdom	The sloop sprang a leak and was abandoned in the English Channel off Beachy Head, Sussex. Her crew were rescued by the brig Diana (United Kingdom). Agenoria was on a voyage from Poole, Dorset to Lee, Kent.
Agnes	United Kingdom	The schooner was wrecked on Eday, Orkney Islands. Her crew survived. She was on a voyage from Dundee, Forfarshire to Australia.
Atlas	United Kingdom	The ship ran aground on Filey Brigg. She was on a voyage from Hull, Yorkshire to Newcastle upon Tyne, Northumberland. Atlas was refloated the next day and taken in to Scarborough, Yorkshire.
Gleaner	United Kingdom	The tug sank in the Irish Sea off Point Lynas, Anglesey. Her crew were rescued.
Idas	United Kingdom	The schooner was in collision with the brig Thomas and Robert (United Kingdom) and sank off the coast of Yorkshire. Her crew were rescued by Thomas and Robert. Idas was on a voyage from Sunderland, County Durham to Harwich, Essex.
Mary	Sweden	The ship was driven ashore and wrecked at Lysekil. Her crew were rescued.
Queen	United Kingdom	The ship was driven ashore at Dublin. She was on a voyage from Dublin to Riga, Russia. She was refloated and towed in to Dublin by the tug Isle of Bute (United Kingdom).
Stephen	United Kingdom	The sloop was driven ashore in Widewall Bay, Orkney Islands. She was on a voyage from Wick, Caithness to an Irish port.
Tell Tale	United Kingdom	The ship was driven ashore at Gravelines, Nord, France. She was on a voyage from Hull to Falmouth, Cornwall. She was refloated and taken in to Dunkirk, Nord.
Varima	United Kingdom	The ship was driven ashore at Burntisland, Fife. She was on a voyage from South Shields, County Durham to Constantinople, Ottoman Empire.

== 30 January ==
List of shipwrecks: 30 January 1854
Ship	State	Description
Elizabeth Taylerson	United Kingdom	The ship ran aground on the Barber Sand, in the North Sea off the coast of Suffolk. She was on a voyage from South Shields, County Durham to London.
Hebe	United Kingdom	The ship ran aground on the Holme Sand, in the North Sea off the coast of Suffolk. She was on a voyage from South Shields to London. She was refloated and taken in to Lowestoft, Suffolk.
Marion	United Kingdom	The ship was driven ashore at Maryport, cumberland.
Romeo	United Kingdom	The barque collided with a brig and sank in the North Sea off the Dudgeon Sandbank. Her crew were rescued. She was on a voyage from Hartlepool, County Durham to London.
Susan	United Kingdom	The sloop was wrecked off St. Bees Head, Cumberland. She was on a voyage from Kirkcudbright to Glasson Dock, Lancashire.
Thomas	United Kingdom	The ship was driven ashore and wrecked at Maryport.
William and Nancy	United Kingdom	The ship was driven ashore at Maryport.
Wilson Rotherley	United Kingdom	The ship was driven ashore at Maryport.

== 31 January ==
List of shipwrecks: 31 January 1854
Ship	State	Description
Charles Jones	United Kingdom	The ship struck a sunken rock and foundered off Esha Ness, Shetland Islands with the loss of all sixteen crew. She was on a voyage from Leith, Lothian to Callao, Peru.
Governor	United Kingdom	The ship was driven ashore in Blacksod Bay. She was on a voyage from Westport, County Mayo to London. She was refloated on 3 February.
Lady Octavia	United Kingdom	The ship was driven ashore at Malin Head, County Donegal. She was on a voyage from Pernambuco, Brazil to the Clyde.
Modeste	France	The lugger was wrecked on the Goodwin Sands, Kent, United Kingdom. her crew were rescued. She was on a voyage from Newcastle upon Tyne, Northumberland, United Kingdom to Libourne, Loire-Inférieure.
Robert	United Kingdom	The ship struck rocks and sank off Rasvåg, Norway. She was on a voyage from London to a Baltic port.
Sophie	Duchy of Holstein	The galeas was driven ashore and wrecked at Kullen, Sweden with the loss of six of her seven crew.

== Unknown date ==
List of shipwrecks: Unknown date in January 1854
Ship	State	Description
Agatha	United Kingdom	The ship foundered in the North Sea off the coast of Lincolnshire. on or before 6 January.
Agenoria	United Kingdom	The ship ran aground on the Herd Sand, in the North Sea off the coast of County Durham. She was refloated on 16 January.
Amazon	United Kingdom	The ship was driven ashore at Callao, Peru. She was on a voyage from San Francisco, California, United States to Callao. She was refloated on 15 January and taken in to Callao.
Amelia	Norway	The ship was in collision with Abyssinia (United Kingdom) and foundered in the North Sea with the loss of two of her crew.
American	Kingdom of the Two Sicilies	The schooner was wrecked in the Black Sea before 13 January.
Ancona	United Kingdom	The ship was driven ashore at Corton, Suffolk. She was refloated on 18 January and towed in to Lowestoft, Suffolk.
Antoinette	Austrian Empire	The brig was wrecked in the Black Sea before 13 January.
Aurora	United Kingdom	The barque ran aground on the Herd Sand. All on board were rescued. She was refloated on 16 January.
Bolivar	Norway	The ship was driven ashore at "Touzia", Greece before 29 January. She was on a voyage from "Tziajasi d'Oofano" to a British port. She was refloated.
Boston	United Kingdom	The brig was driven ashore before 4 January. She was on a voyage from Halifax, Nova Scotia, British North America to Boston, Massachusetts, United States.
Bradford	United Kingdom	The ship was driven ashore and wrecked on the coast of County Durham.
British Isles	United Kingdom	The barque was driven ashore at Essequibo, British Guiana.
Brothers	United Kingdom	The brig was driven ashore and wrecked at Conil, Spain. She was on a voyage from Bristol, Gloucestershire to Genoa, Kingdom of Sardinia.
Constitution	United States	The ship abandoned in the Atlantic Ocean. She was on a voyage from New York to Havre de Grâce, Seine-Inférieure, France.
Earl Stratfield	United Kingdom	The ship capsized and was wrecked at Wallsend, Northumberland.
Edward and Maria	United Kingdom	The ship was driven ashore. She was on a voyage from Baltimore, Maryland, United States to London. She was refloated and towed back to Baltimore, where she arrived on 8 January.
Elizabeth Bruce	United Kingdom	The ship was wrecked near the Carysfoot Reef Lighthouse, Florida, United States before 20 January. She was on a voyage from Liverpool, Lancashire to Mobile, Alabama, United States.
Emma	Bremen	The schooner was wrecked on the Beaver Tail. She was on a voyage from Philadelphia, Pennsylvania to Boston, Massachusetts, United States.
Emilie	France	The brig was wrecked near Conil.
England's Queen	United Kingdom	The ship was driven ashore at Callao. She was on a voyage from the Chincha Islands, Peru to Callao. She was refloated on 15 January and taken in to Callao.
Estelle	France	The ship was wrecked on the Spanish coast before 21 January. She was on a voyage from Marseille, Bouches-du-Rhône to Boulogne, Pas-de-Calais.
Eugene Jenny	France	The ship was driven ashore at Porto Ercole, Grand Duchy of Tuscany and was abandoned by her crew. She was reboarded the next day.
Gazelle	France	The ship was wrecked at Bayonne, Basses-Pyrénées.
Haverdahl	Sweden	The schooner was abandoned at sea before 16 January. Her crew were rescued by Fidentia (Denmark).
Helen	United Kingdom	The brig was abandoned in the Atlantic Ocean before 20 January.
Henry Poole	United Kingdom	The ship was driven ashore and wrecked at Absecon, New Jersey, United States. She was on a voyage from the Clyde to New York.
Hermes	United Kingdom	The barque was wrecked on the English Bank, in the River Plate.
Hoffnung	(flag) Kingdom of Hanover	The ship was wrecked at Leer before 4 January.
Huron	(United Kingdom of Great Britain and Ireland) British North America	The ship was abandoned in the Atlantic Ocean. Her crew were rescued by Favourite (United Kingdom). Huron was on a voyage from Saint John, New Brunswick to Liverpool.
Indus	United Kingdom	The ship ran aground off Helsingør, Denmark before 5 January. She was on a voyage from Danzig to Liverpool. She was refloated on 7 January and taken in to Helsingør.
James Corner	United States	The ship ran aground on the Tinaux Bank.
Jane Brixton	United Kingdom	The ship was driven ashore and wrecked on the coast of County Durham.
Joachim	Austrian Empire	The brig was wrecked in the Black Sea before 13 January.
Julia	United Kingdom	The ship was driven ashore and wrecked on the coast of County Durham.
Juno	(flag) Netherlands	The brig was abandoned at sea. Five crew were rescued by Mathilde (Flag unknown).
Les Deux Amis	France	The brig was wrecked near Conil.
Margaretta	United Kingdom	The ship foundered in the North Sea. She was on a voyage from South Shields to London.
Mary Jane	United Kingdom	The brig was wrecked on the Jedore Ledges before 20 January with the loss of 144 of the 150 people on board. She was on a voyage from Dublin to New York.
Mountaineer	United Kingdom	The collier ran aground on the Herd Sand. She was refloated on 14 January and taken in to South Shields, County Durham.
Nostra Senora della Misericordia	Kingdom of Sardinia	The brig was wrecked in the Black Sea before 13 January.
Parthian	Denmark	The barque capsized and sank in the River Wye.
Petit	France	The ship was driven ashore at Sunderland. She was refloated on 16 January.
Preetedina	Kingdom of Hanover	The ship was wrecked at Leer before 4 January.
Prince	(United Kingdom of Great Britain and Ireland) British North America	The schooner was lost whilst on a voyage from St. Mary's, Nova Scotia to Liverpool. Her crew were rescued.
Protection	United Kingdom	The brig was driven ashore and wrecked at Figueira da Foz, Portugal before 19 January with the loss of three of her crew. She was on a voyage from Liverpool to Porto, Portugal.
Robert H. Stockton	United States	The schooner was abandoned in the Atlantic Ocean before 4 January.
San Nicolo	Flag unknown	The ship was lost in the Black Sea before 13 January.
South Carolina	United States	The ship was driven ashore at Blankenberge, West Flanders, Belgium. She was on a voyage from New York to Antwerp, Belgium. She was refloated on 14 January.
Tenterden	United Kingdom	The ship was driven ashore on the coast of County Durham before 12 January. She was on a voyage from Sunderland to London. She was later refloated with the aid of a smack.
Teopastos	Austrian Empire	The brig was wrecked in the Black Sea before 13 January.
William Wood	United Kingdom	The ship foundered in the Atlantic Ocean before 29 January.
