= Montrose railway station (Caledonian Railway) =

Former railway station in Scotland

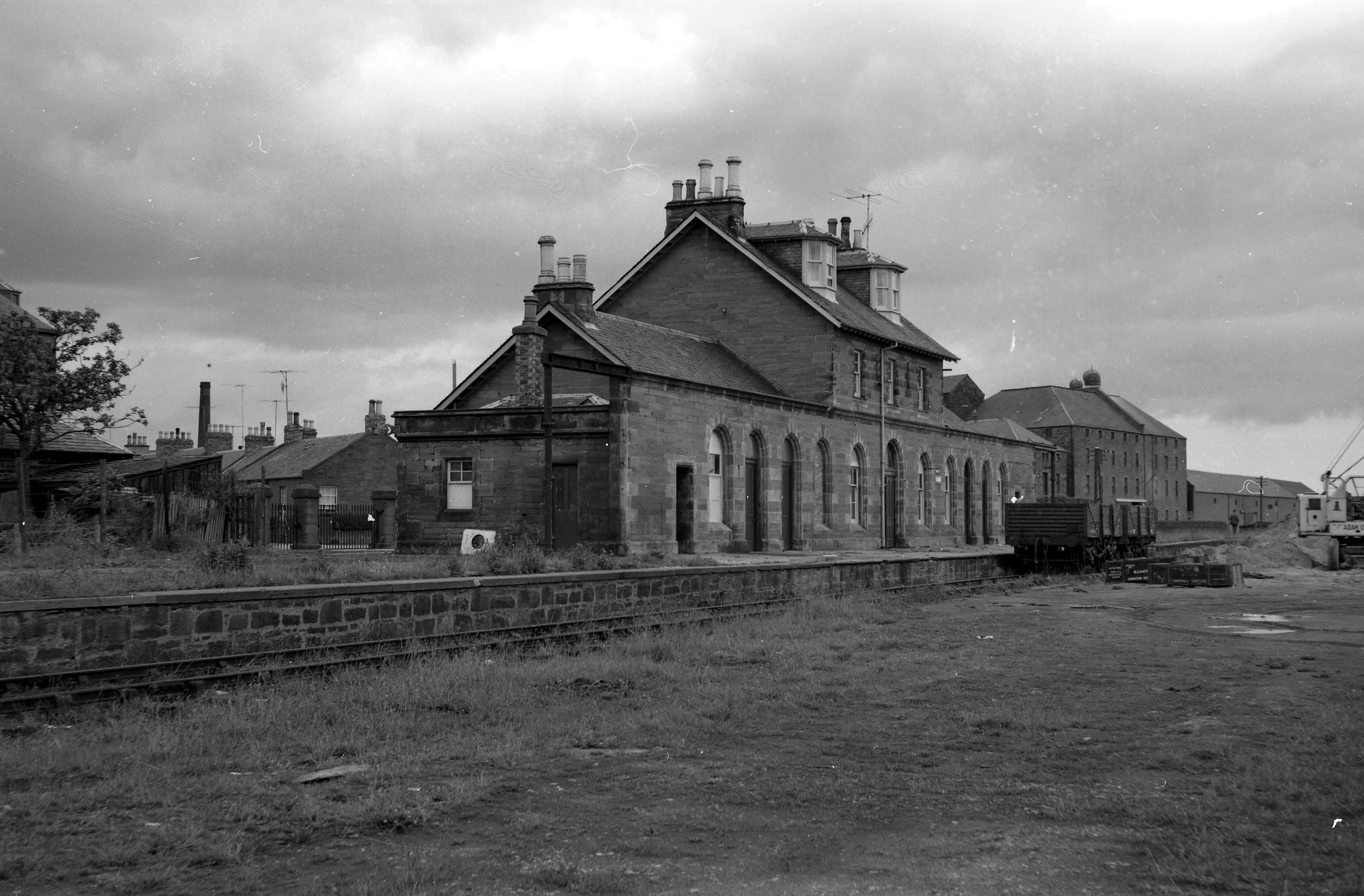
- Montrose railway station in 1960

General information
- Location: Montrose, Angus; Scotland
- Coordinates: 56.707419°N 2.463588°W
- Platforms: 2

Other information
- Status: Disused

History
- Pre-grouping: Aberdeen Railway; Caledonian Railway

Key dates
- 1 February 1848: Opened
- 30 April 1934: Closed
Location

Montrose railway station was opened on 1 February 1848 by the Aberdeen Railway as a terminus of a short branch from Dubton Junction. Services initially comprised trains to the junction at Dubton, with some continuing through to Brechin.

When the Montrose and Bervie Railway opened on 1 November 1865, its trains were initially worked by the Scottish North Eastern Railway and used this station. These working were taken over by the Caledonian Railway when it took over the SNER. These services were transferred to Montrose railway station when the North British Railway built its new line from Arbroath to Kinnaber (the North British, Arbroath and Montrose Railway).

It was closed to passengers on 30 April 1934 and trains from Dubton ran into the former North British Railway station in Montrose.

The area of the extensive sidings at this station has now been built on with houses. The station building remains as a retirement home but its extensive trainshed has been removed and replaced with a tasteful canopy. The building has been stone-cleaned. The station was closed in preference to the other station in Montrose which was on the Dundee to Aberdeen main line rather than the terminus of a short branch.

== Stationmasters ==
- James Wilkie 1856 - 1879
- Richard Hermon 1879 - 1898 (formerly station master at Brechin)
- Peter Mutch 1898 - 1909
- James S. Mitchell 1909 - 1911 (formerly station master at Stonehaven)
- William Taylor 1911 - 1927 (formerly station master at Stonehaven)
- Robert Cunningham 1927 - 1933 (formerly station master at Bellshill, afterwards station master at Coatbridge)

Preceding station	Historical railways	Following station
Terminus	Caledonian Railway; Aberdeen Railway	Dubton
Terminus	North British Railway; Montrose and Bervie Railway	Broomfield Junction Halt
