= Brechin railway station =

Heritage railway station in Angus, Scotland

Brechin
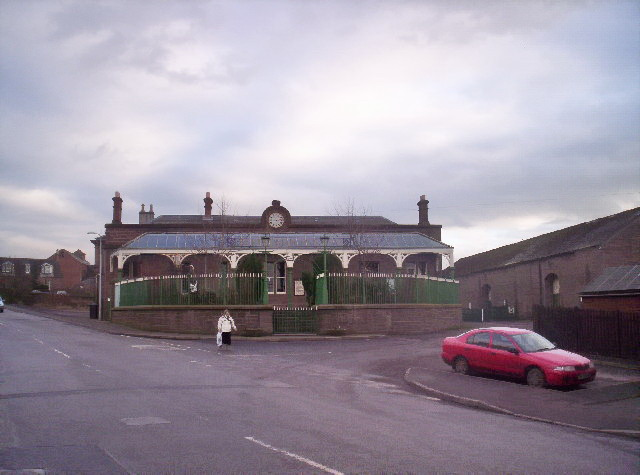

General information
- Location: Brechin, Angus, Scotland
- Coordinates: 56.731298°N 2.652414°W
- Grid reference: NO601601
- System: Station on heritage railway
- Manager: Caledonian Railway (Brechin)
- Platforms: 2

History
- Original company: Aberdeen Railway
- Pre-grouping: Caledonian Railway
- Post-grouping: London Midland and Scottish Railway

Key dates
- 1 February 1848: Opened by the Aberdeen Railway
- 4 August 1952: Closed to passengers
- 1981: Closed to all traffic
- 1993: Reopened by Caledonian Railway

Listed Building – Category B
- Designated: 18 August 1986
- Reference no.: LB22536
Location

Brechin is a heritage railway station in Angus, Scotland. It lies on the Caledonian Railway's line to Bridge of Dun.

== History ==
The station was opened on 1 February 1848. Initially four trains per day ran between Brechin and Montrose; the fares were 1s 4d for first class, 1s second class and 8d third class.

The station buildings were constructed in 1847-48. By 1872, there were complaints about the state of the station and the lack of comfortable accommodation for passengers. However, nothing was done until the Caledonian Railway purchased the Forfar and Brechin Railway in 1893. The new owners then planned a major extension, largely prompted by the imminent arrival of the Brechin and Edzell District Railway. It began negotiations with Brechin Town Council for the purchase of land and widening of streets. The changes started in 1895 with the expansion of the goods department on land purchased by the company from the town council in Strachan's Park. The station passenger accommodation was then extended in 1897-98 to designs by Thomas Barr, district engineer for Perth.

The station was closed to passenger traffic on 4 August 1952; the last train on the branch line was a train from Montrose. Passenger services on the Forfar-Brechin and Brechin-Bridge of Dun-Montrose line were withdrawn to save £11,000 per annum (equivalent to £280,000 in 2025). Freight traffic stopped in 1981.

=== Accidents and incidents ===
During the extension works, there was a serious accident at the station on 27 August 1895. A passenger service from Forfar, due in at 9.00am, failed to stop at the platform and crashed through the terminus and ended up on the roadway leading to the goods station. A number of passengers on the train sustained severe shock, but fortunately there were no injuries. A Board of Trade inquiry was held on 10 September 1895 by Colonel George William Addison R.E.

Shortly after the station was extended, there was another serious accident on 2 November 1898. The driver of a goods train from Forfar consisting of engine no. 521, a six-wheeled locomotive with a six-wheeled tender, 30 loaded cattle trucks and a brake van, lost control of his train when descending the incline towards the station. It struck the buffer stops at the end of the line and demolished them, crossed the platform behind the stops and went through the stone wall of the station building and came to rest in the booking hall. Several columns were destroyed and a section of the platform canopy collapsed. The driver and fireman managed to jump clear before the engine left the rails and were not badly injured; 11 cattle trucks were wrecked and 88 cattle were killed or injured. The blame was placed on the driver, John Habenton, for not exercising control over his train.

=== Stationmasters ===
- James Petrie ca. 1851-67
- Richard Hermon ca. 1874-79 (later station master at Montrose)
- Robert Elliott 1879-1920
- David Smythe 1920-24 (later station master at Forfar)
- Alexander Farquharson 1924 - 1934 (formerly station master at Dunning)
- David Lithgow 1934-43 (later station master at Dumbarton)
- David M. Tyndall 1943-49 (later station master at Lockerbie)
- George A. Cumming 1949-50 (later station master at Aviemore)
- Robert Turnbull 1950-53 (formerly station master at Kyle of Lochalsh)
- James H. Brown 1953-61 (formerly station master at Aboyne).

== The station today ==
The station is now the headquarters of the Caledonian Railway (Brechin) Ltd, a private limited company formed by a group of steam railway enthusiasts, named the Brechin Railway Preservation Society. Their objective is to operate a railway service on the former Caledonian Railway line between Brechin and Montrose.

In 2023, a footbridge manufactured in 1877 and formerly located near the former Strathbungo railway station in Glasgow was reconstructed at the station.

Preceding station	Heritage railways	Following station
Terminus	Caledonian Railway	Bridge of Dun Terminus
Historical railways
Terminus	Caledonian Railway; Aberdeen Railway	Bridge of Dun
Terminus	Caledonian Railway; Forfar and Brechin Railway	Careston
Terminus	Caledonian Railway; Brechin and Edzell District Railway	Stracathro

== Gallery ==
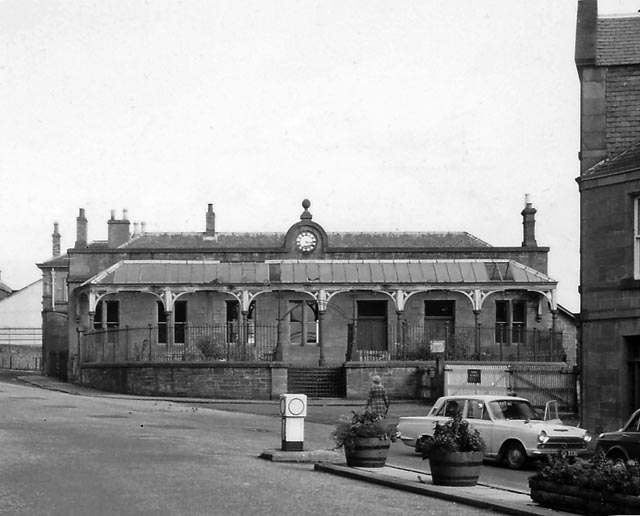
The station front in 1974

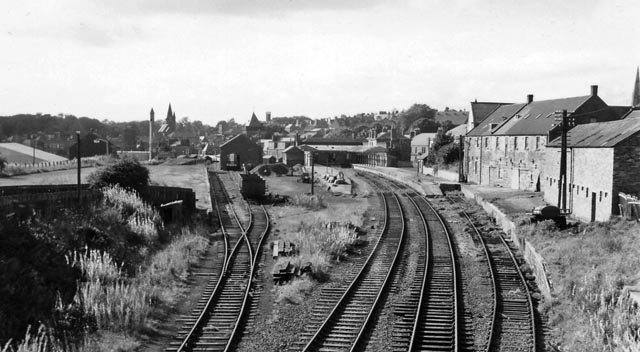
View trackside
