= Craigo railway station =

Disused railway station in Craigo, Angus

Craigo
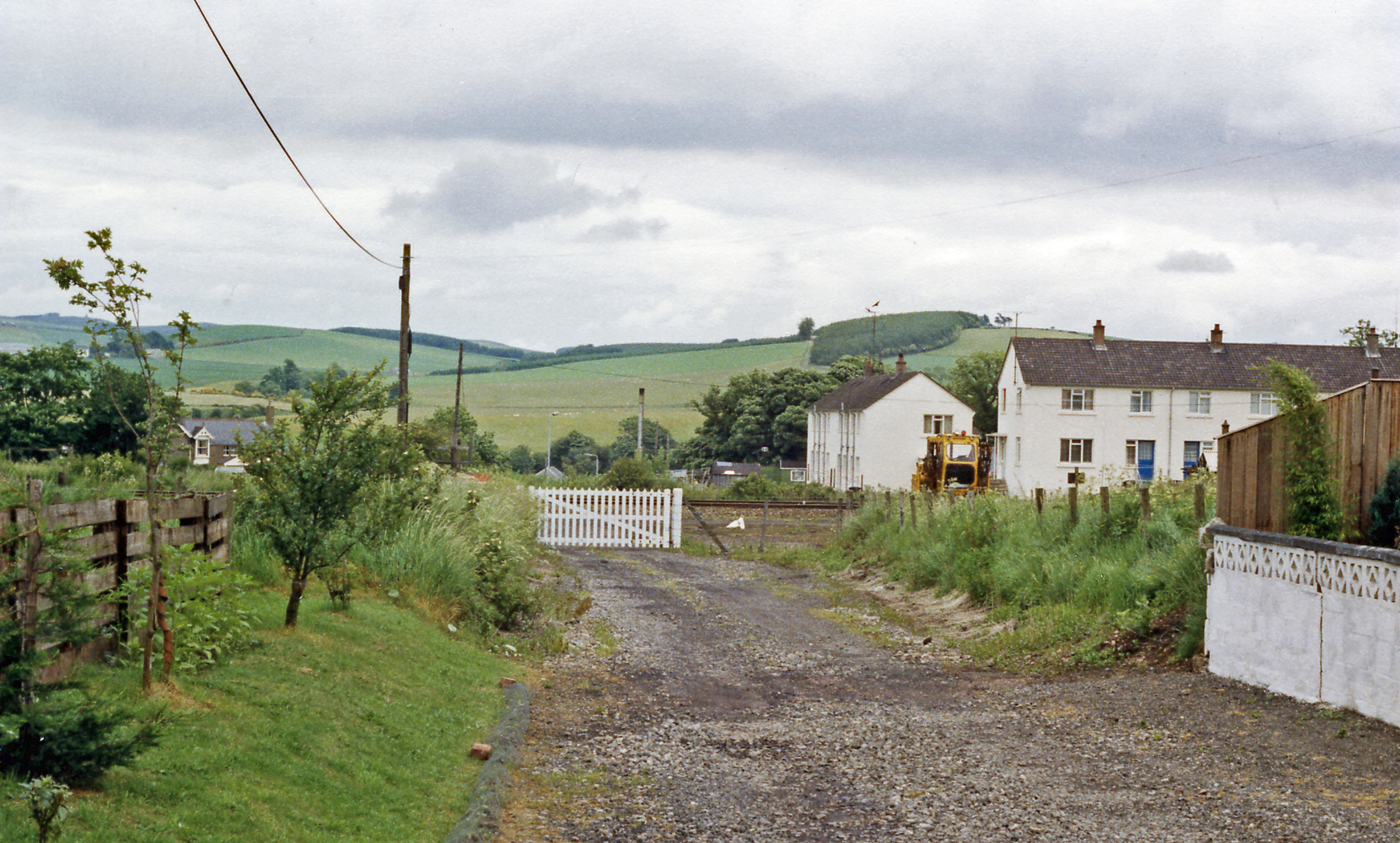
- The site of the station in 1988

General information
- Location: Craigo, Angus; Scotland
- Coordinates: 56.7699°N 2.5117°W
- Grid reference: NO688643
- Platforms: 2

Other information
- Status: Disused

History
- Original company: Aberdeen Railway
- Pre-grouping: Caledonian Railway
- Post-grouping: London, Midland and Scottish Railway

Key dates
- February 1851: Opened
- 11 June 1956: Closed
Location

Craigo railway station served the village of Craigo, Angus, Scotland from 1851 to 1956 on the Aberdeen Railway.

== History ==
The station opened in 1851 by the Aberdeen Railway. The station closed to both passengers and goods traffic on 11 June 1956.

Preceding station	Historical railways	Following station
Marykirk; Line open, Station closed	Aberdeen Railway	Dubton; Line open, station closed
