= Storm Babet =

2023 windstorm over northwestern Europe

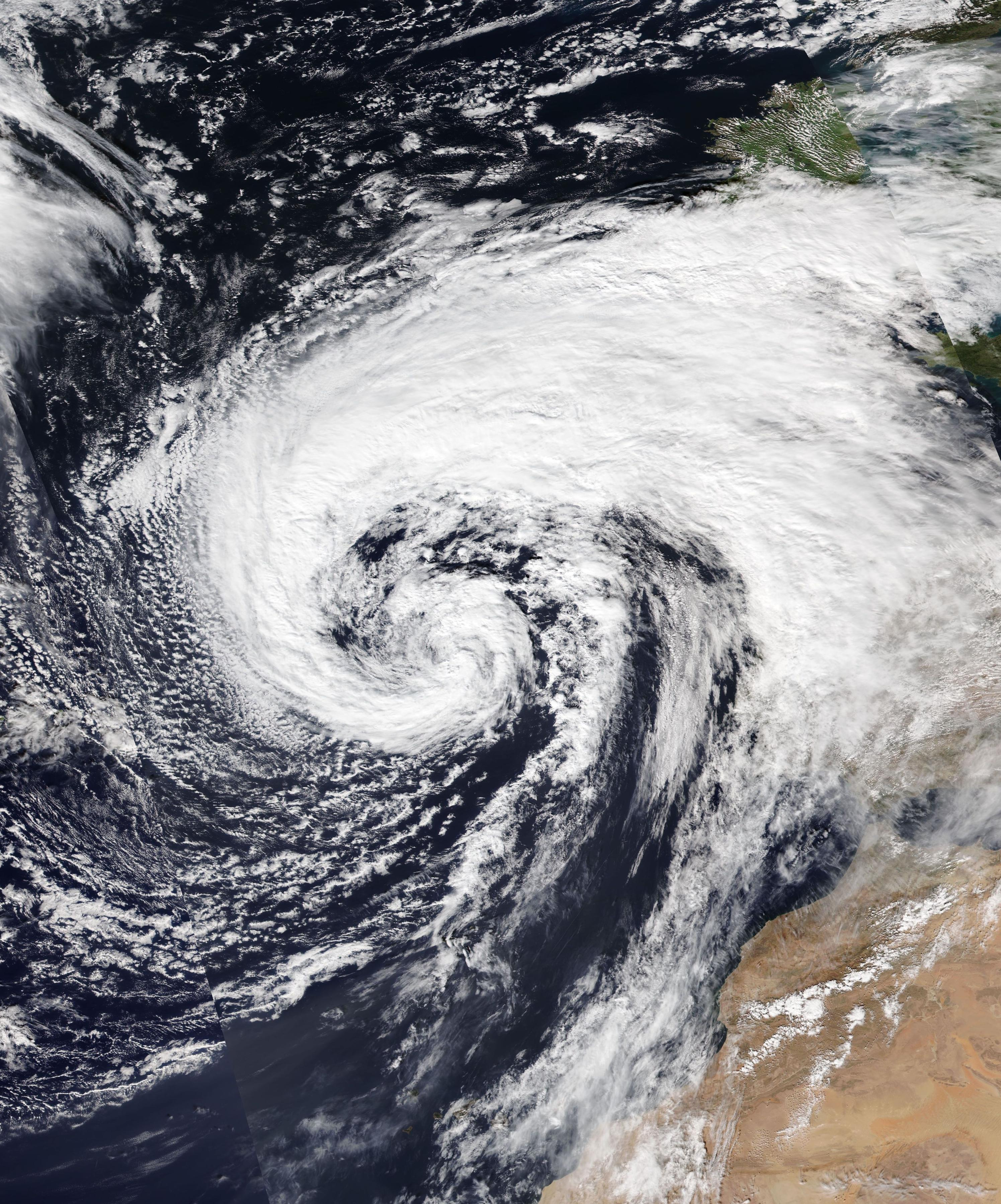
- Storm Babet on 16 October 2023

Meteorological history
- Formed: 15 October 2023
- Dissipated: 22 October 2023

Extratropical cyclone
- Highest gusts: 185 km/h (115 mph; 100 kn) at Cairn Gorm, Scotland
- Lowest pressure: 977 hPa (mbar); 28.85 inHg

Overall effects
- Fatalities: 8: United Kingdom: 7; Germany: 1
- Evacuated: 3,172: Germany: 2,000; United Kingdom: 1,172
- Damage: €691 million
- Areas affected: Denmark, France, Germany, Ireland, Norway, Portugal, Spain, Sweden, United Kingdom
- Power outages: 113,400+: United Kingdom: 90,700+; Norway: 22,700+
- Part of the 2023–24 European windstorm season

Storm Babet (known as Storm Viktor in Germany) was an intense extratropical cyclone which affected large parts of northern and western Europe. The second named storm of the 2023–24 European windstorm season, Babet was named by the UK's Met Office on 16 October 2023.

== Impact ==
=== Denmark ===
On 20 October, parts of Denmark experienced water levels over two metres higher than usual, with a water level of 2.16 m (7 ft 1 in) measured in Aabenraa and Hesnæs, and many parts of Aabenraa had to be evacuated. In Sønderborg, the storm surge was the highest since 1904, with a water level of 2.10 m (6 ft 11 in) above normal, and was the highest since records began in 1892 at Gedser with a height of 1.89 m (6 ft 2 in) above normal. A wind gust of 122 km/h (34 m/s) was recorded in Nordborg.

142 flights at Copenhagen Airport were cancelled due to the storm. Køge consistently had a water level of 1 m (3 ft 3 in) through most of the storm, especially in the central area. All areas by the coastline in Haderslev Municipality were ordered to evacuate as many areas were on the verge of flooding.

The massive Lolland Dike that goes from parts of Lolland and Falster was at the brink of collapse as the storm almost overwhelmed the old dike.

On the Baltic Sea island of Bornholm, the towns Allinge-Sandvig and Tejn were hit hardest, with roads being torn up by the storm. Many houses were destroyed or water damaged, and some houses got swept away. Bornholm fared better than the rest of Denmark, but the coastal and fishing towns were in a poor state afterwards.

=== Germany ===
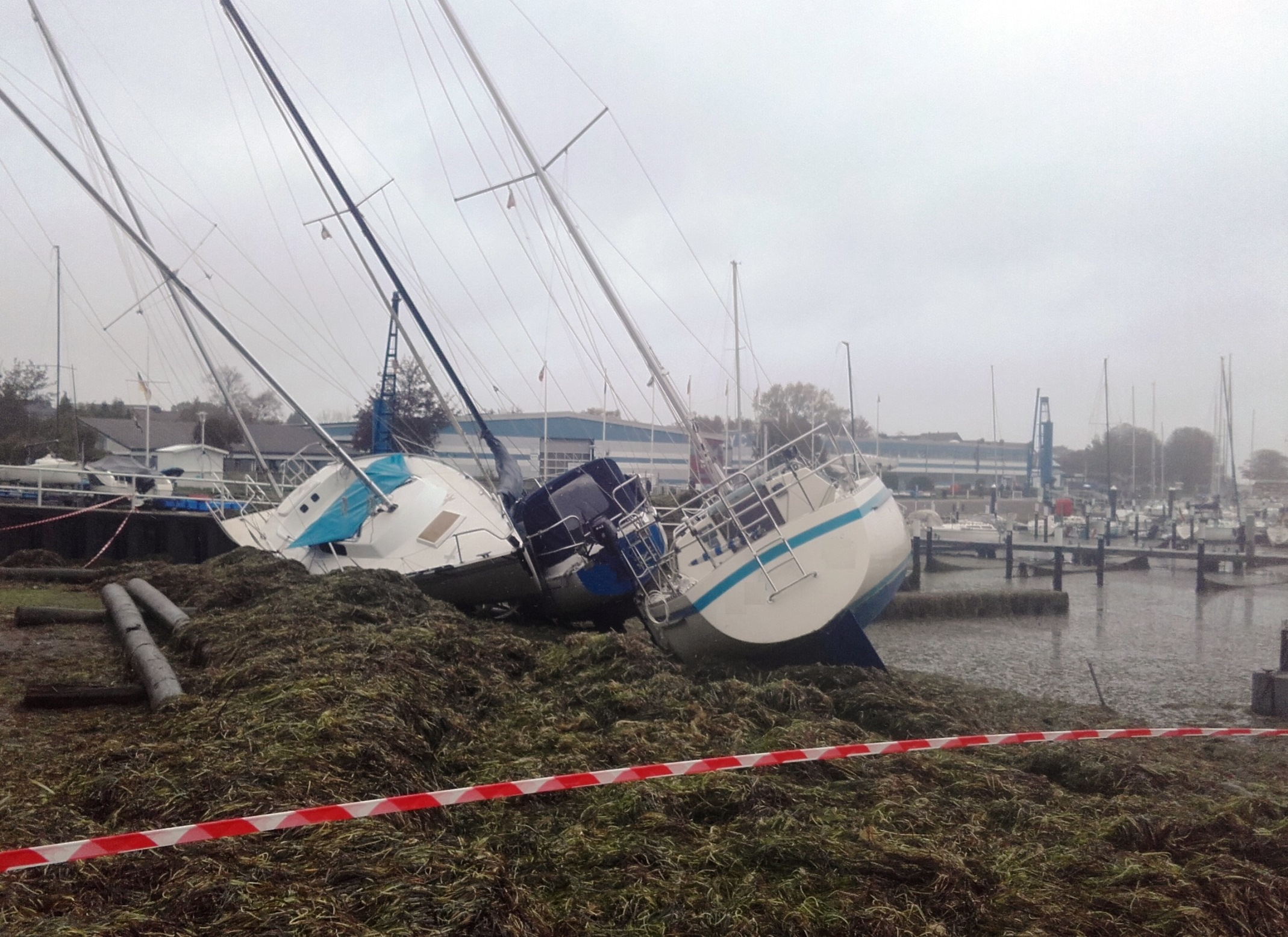
Yachts thrown ashore at Strande, taken on 23 October.

On 19 October, a 33-year-old woman was killed on the German island of Fehmarn when her car was hit by a falling tree. In Schleswig-Holstein, around 2,000 people were evacuated due to a storm surge. Brodersby, Eckernförde and Schleswig were among the places affected by the evacuations. In Flensburg, water levels reached 2.27 m (7 ft 5 in) above the usual level. The head of the disaster control department in the Schleswig-Holstein Ministry of the Interior, Ralf Kirchhoff, said he expects flood damage to be in the three-digit million range.

On 21 October, a wind gust of 33 m/s (120 km/h; 74 mph) was recorded at Feldberg, Schwarzwald.

=== Portugal ===
On 17 October, ceilings in the terminal building of Faro Airport collapsed after 59.2 mm (2.33 in) of rain fell in the area and caused flooding. Roofs were ripped off of homes in Castro Marim.

=== Norway ===
On 21 October, 22,700 people were without electricity in Southern Norway according to Agder Energi after strong winds caused damage to homes, power masts and trees. County Road 55 was closed due to the storm, and several planes had to cancel their landings at Kristiansand Airport after winds reached 40 m/s (140 km/h).

=== United Kingdom ===
On 18 October, Storm Babet hit Torbay, with a beach bar swept into the sea in Torquay and major damage to beach huts in Paignton and Teignmouth, where a seaside skatepark was flooded.

On 19 October, a 57-year-old woman's body was recovered from the North Esk river in Angus, Scotland after she was swept into the Water of Lee. A tree hit a van on the B9127 road in Whigstreet, Angus, killing the 56-year-old driver. 335 homes were asked to evacuate in Brechin after heavy rainfall caused fears that the River South Esk could burst its banks, and an additional 87 homes in Tannadice and Finavon were also asked to evacuate. The Roker Pier in Sunderland was damaged by waves and winds, with several metres of railings being destroyed and sections of decking around the lighthouse being washed away.

On 20 October, a man was killed in Cleobury Mortimer, Shropshire, after being swept away by flood waters. Two women were killed in a crash involving four cars and a lorry which overturned amid high winds on the M4 motorway. Police began searching for a man who was trapped inside a vehicle in floodwater near Marykirk, Aberdeenshire, with searches continuing until 23 October when he was found dead inside his vehicle. In South Shields, the Tyne South Pier light lost its top during the storm.

On 21 October, a woman in her 80s was found dead at her home in Chesterfield, Derbyshire, after flooding. In Catcliffe, South Yorkshire, 250 homes were evacuated after the River Rother flooded. 45 workers were airlifted off of the Stena Spey drilling platform in the North Sea by HM Coastguard after four of the platform's eight anchors detached themselves due to the severe weather. Scottish and Southern Electricity Networks (SSEN) said they had restored power to around 36,000 customers, with a remaining 700 properties waiting to have power restored. Other power outages included 40,000 Northern Powergrid customers and 14,000 Scottish Power customers.

On 22 October, around 500 homes were urged to evacuate in Retford following high water levels on the River Idle, which prompted two severe flood warnings in the area. A sinkhole appeared on the eponymous Bridge of Dun in Angus.

Throughout the entire storm event, beaches in the North East experienced severe erosion leaving them exposed and vulnerable to the remaining winter storms. The severity of this change was attributed in part to the storm duration, with waves over 4 m high for in excess of 72 hours. In East Lothian, the Musselburgh coastline suffered a major hit with around 4,000 cubic metres of sediment removed from its beaches, equating to approximately 5 years' worth of erosion in one event. Property damage nationwide exceed £500 million (US$608 million).

==== Travel disruption ====
On 20 October, a plane skidded off a runway whilst landing at Leeds Bradford Airport, causing the airport to close. All of the passengers aboard the TUI flight from Corfu were evacuated from the plane safely, and the airport reopened at 11:30 BST the next day. The storm caused the suspension of the Shields Ferry until 22 October.

The storm caused severe disruption to travel after many roads were closed and railways flooded. On 21 October, King's Cross railway station in Central London was closed due to overcrowding caused by the disruption. Avanti West Coast, LNER and Northern Trains advised passengers to avoid travelling after their lines were widely flooded. Flooding between Doncaster and Wakefield caused "an extremely limited service" and no LNER services were running north of Edinburgh, with no rail replacement services available due to road closures. Northern said all lines between Cheadle Hulme and Wilmslow were blocked due to damage to overhead electric wires, and services were not running from Sheffield to Nottingham or Lincoln due to flooding. Trains were unable to travel between Leeds and Bradford, Doncaster and Harrogate; and the line between Newcastle and Morpeth was closed after damage to a viaduct. Avanti West Coast asked customers not to travel between Crewe and North Wales.

=== Seabird displacement ===
Storm Babet displaced unprecedented numbers of seabirds into the Firth of Forth, these were mainly European storm petrels but also included Leach's storm petrel, grey phalaropes and little auks.

== Legacy ==
=== United Kingdom ===
The Met Office, the UK's national weather service, announced it would review its warnings as a result of the floods in Suffolk and Norfolk. Only a yellow warning was issued for the area, but Suffolk County Council declared a major incident after severe flooding.

== See also ==
- Weather of 2023
- 2023 United Kingdom floods
- Great storm of 1987 – a powerful European windstorm which also hit the United Kingdom during mid-October.
