= Farnell Road railway station =

Disused railway station in Farnell, Angus

Farnell Road
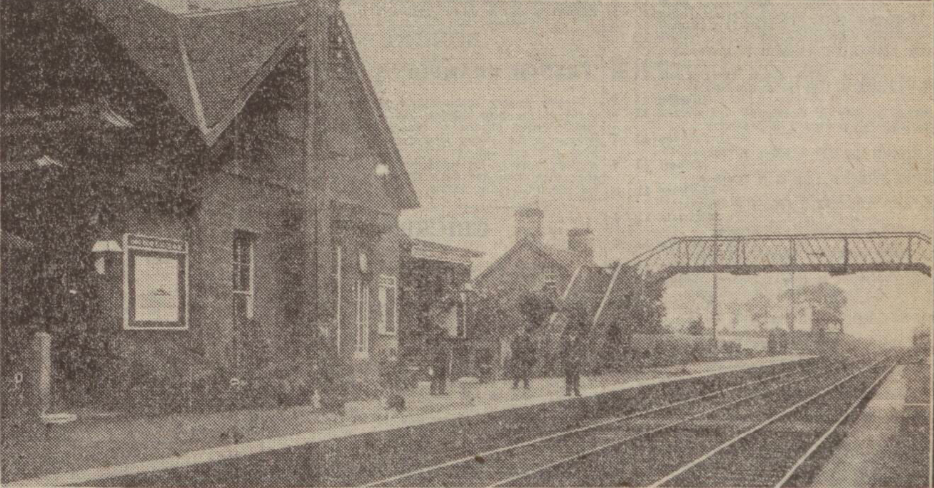
- From Aberdeen Press and Journal 16 December 1927

General information
- Location: Farnell, Angus; Scotland
- Coordinates: 56.6876°N 2.6078°W
- Platforms: 2

Other information
- Status: Disused

History
- Original company: Aberdeen Railway
- Pre-grouping: Aberdeen Railway; Caledonian Railway
- Post-grouping: London, Midland and Scottish Railway

Key dates
- May 1848: Opened
- 11 June 1956: Closed
Location

Farnell Road railway station served the village of Farnell, Angus, Scotland from 1848 to 1956 on the Aberdeen Railway.

== History ==
The station opened in May 1848 by the Aberdeen Railway. To the west of the southbound platform was the signal box.

In 1927 the station won first prize in an LMS competition for the best kept railway station.

The station closed to both passengers and goods traffic on 11 June 1956.

Preceding station	Historical railways	Following station
Bridge of Dun; Line closed, station open (preserved line)	Aberdeen Railway	Glasterlaw; Line and station closed
