= List of listed buildings in Marykirk, Aberdeenshire =

This is a list of listed buildings in the parish of Marykirk in Aberdeenshire, Scotland.

== List ==
Name	Location	Date Listed	Grid Ref. (Note: Sometimes known as OSGB36, the grid reference (where provided) is based on the British national grid reference system used by the Ordnance Survey. • "Guide to National Grid". Ordnance Survey. • "Get-a-map". Ordnance Survey.)	Geo-coordinates	Notes	LB Number (Note: Historic Environment Scotland assign a unique alphanumeric identifier to each designated site in Scotland, for listed buildings this always begins with "LB", for example "LB12345".)	Image
Adams Building (J Gourlay) Marykirk Village				56°46′55″N 2°30′57″W	Category B	16310	Upload Photo
Balmakewan House				56°47′18″N 2°32′40″W	Category B	16285	Upload Photo
Inglismaldie Castle				56°47′32″N 2°35′05″W	Category B	16287	Upload Photo
Caldhaime Bridge				56°48′26″N 2°32′39″W	Category B	16294	Upload Photo
Thornton Castle				56°50′12″N 2°30′49″W	Category B	16295	Upload Photo
Manse Of Aberluthnott (Formerly Marykirk) Marykirk Including Garden Wall, Gatepiers, And Outbuilding				56°46′48″N 2°30′54″W	Category B	16302	Upload Photo
Market Cross				56°46′53″N 2°30′54″W	Category C(S)	16307	Upload Photo
Bridge At Mill Of Blackiemuir				56°50′03″N 2°29′46″W	Category C(S)	19793	Upload Photo
Hatton Mains, Garden Walls And Garden Building Now Double Garage				56°47′53″N 2°31′53″W	Category B	16282	Upload Photo
Inglismaldie Castle, Dovecot				56°47′22″N 2°35′14″W	Category A	16289	Upload Photo
Former Manse Of Sauchieburn				56°49′03″N 2°33′03″W	Category C(S)	16293	Upload Photo
Thornton Aisle In Churchyard Of Aberluthnott (Formerly Marykirk) Marykirk				56°46′49″N 2°30′53″W	Category B	16300	Upload Photo
Mary Mill				56°46′44″N 2°30′54″W	Category C(S)	16305	Upload Photo
Rose Cottage And Cottages Occupied By Lindsay, Mathers And Milne, Marykirk Village				56°46′55″N 2°30′56″W	Category C(S)	16309	Upload Photo
Balmakewan House, Twin Dovecots				56°47′12″N 2°32′58″W	Category B	16286	Upload Photo
Inglismaldie Castle, Garden Walls				56°47′33″N 2°35′13″W	Category C(S)	16288	Upload Photo
Aberluthnott (Formerly Marykirk) Parish Church, Marykirk, Including Walls, Railings And Gates				56°46′51″N 2°30′53″W	Category B	16299	Upload Photo
Upper North Water Bridge				56°47′08″N 2°34′12″W	Category A	13892	Upload Photo
Marykirk Hotel Marykirk Village				56°46′53″N 2°30′55″W	Category C(S)	16308	Upload Photo
Railway Bridge Over Roadway At Cobleheugh				56°47′04″N 2°31′15″W	Category C(S)	16276	Upload Photo
Mains Of Kirktonhill, House				56°47′12″N 2°29′53″W	Category C(S)	16277	Upload Photo
Former Manse, Luthermuir				56°48′25″N 2°33′55″W	Category C(S)	16290	Upload Photo
Luthermuir Chapel				56°48′19″N 2°34′07″W	Category C(S)	16291	Upload Photo
Spear Mill Farmhouse				56°46′34″N 2°30′34″W	Category C(S)	16303	Upload Photo
Marykirk Bridge Over River North Esk				56°46′32″N 2°30′56″W	Category A	13891	Upload Photo
Auld House, Marykirk Village				56°46′56″N 2°30′57″W	Category C(S)	16275	Upload Photo
Balmanno House, Including Outbuildings Garden Walls And Coachhouse				56°47′21″N 2°30′24″W	Category A	16278	Upload Photo
Myresdie Farmhouse				56°47′29″N 2°31′08″W	Category C(S)	16279	Upload Photo
Gates And Lodges Formerly To Kirktonhill House, Marykirk Village				56°46′52″N 2°30′54″W	Category B	16306	Upload Photo
Luthermuir, Main Street, K6 Telephone Kiosk				56°48′27″N 2°33′44″W	Category B	18981	Upload Photo
Hatton Mains Steading, Former Stables And Coachhouses Forming Front Of South-East Section Of Steading Only				56°47′53″N 2°31′59″W	Category B	16283	Upload Photo
Sauchieburn Chapel				56°49′03″N 2°33′02″W	Category C(S)	16292	Upload Photo
Marykirk Station, School And Schoolhouse				56°47′51″N 2°30′57″W	Category C(S)	16280	Upload Photo
Hatton Dovecot				56°47′40″N 2°31′58″W	Category B	16284	Upload Photo
Spear Mill				56°46′34″N 2°30′36″W	Category B	16304	Upload Photo
Hatton Mains House				56°47′54″N 2°31′56″W	Category B	16281	Upload Photo
Aberluthnott (Formerly Marykirk) Parish Church, Churchyard, Marykirk				56°46′51″N 2°30′53″W	Category C(S)	16301	Upload Photo

== Key ==
The scheme for classifying buildings in Scotland is:

- Category A: "buildings of national or international importance, either architectural or historic; or fine, little-altered examples of some particular period, style or building type."
- Category B: "buildings of regional or more than local importance; or major examples of some particular period, style or building type, which may have been altered."
- Category C: "buildings of local importance; lesser examples of any period, style, or building type, as originally constructed or moderately altered; and simple traditional buildings which group well with other listed buildings."

In March 2016 there were 47,288 listed buildings in Scotland. Of these, 8% were Category A, and 50% were Category B, with the remaining 42% being Category C.

== See also ==
- List of listed buildings in Aberdeenshire
