= Caledonian Railway (Brechin) =

Heritage railway line in Angus, Scotland

- Locale: Brechin, Angus, Scotland
- Coordinates: 56.7315°N 2.652°W

Commercial operations
- Name: Caledonian Railway
- Built by: Caledonian Railway
- Original gauge: 4 ft 8 1/2 in (1,435 mm) standard gauge

Preserved operations
- Owned by: Caledonian Railway (Brechin)
- Operated by: Caledonian Railway (Brechin)
- Stations: 2
- Length: 4 miles (6.4 km)
- Preserved gauge: 4 ft 8 1/2 in (1,435 mm)
- 1993: Reopened

The Caledonian Railway (Brechin) Ltd is a private limited company formed by a group of steam railway enthusiasts, the Brechin Railway Preservation Society, with the object of operating a railway service on the former Caledonian Railway line between Brechin and Montrose, in Angus, Scotland. The line was built by the Aberdeen Railway in the 1840s; it closed for passenger traffic during the early 1950s, with final closure undertaken by British Rail in 1981. The society was formed in 1979 and heritage trains first ran in 1993.

== Current route ==
The line has now been reinstated and preserved for 4 miles (6.4 km) between Brechin and Bridge of Dun. Since 1993, trains have operated at weekends during the summer, as well as on special occasions at other times of the year. The two stations have also been refurbished.

Although the line originally went all the way to Montrose, which is still a station on the National Rail network, there are no immediate plans to link the Brechin line back to it. The section at Dubton through and on to Kinnaber Junction, close to Montrose itself, has now been redeveloped, making it difficult for the preserved railway to be reconnected. In 2023, Angus Council began consultation on options available to improve active travel to some routes in Angus, including Brechin to Montrose; a shared-use path alongside the operational and former railway line is one of the options.

== Proposed extension ==
There is still hope of seeing the "CR Brechin" extended a further 3 1/2 miles (5.6 km) to Dubton, bringing it up to a total of 7 1/2 miles (12.1 km) in length. This is a long-term aim, which would only require the reinstatement of a short length of track.

== Locomotives ==
=== Steam ===
The following steam locomotive is based at the Caledonian Railway:

Number	Type	Status	Livery	Image
6	Hunslet Austerity 0-6-0ST	Awaiting overhaul		No. 3698 Repulse, a locomotive of the same class

=== Diesel ===
The following diesel locomotives are based at the Caledonian Railway:

Class	Number / name	Status	Livery	Image
08	13059 / D3059 Brechin City			
25	25072	Stored, awaiting overhaul		
25	25083	Stored, awaiting repairs		
26	D5301	Stored, awaiting overhaul	BR Green	
26	D5314	Operational	BR Green	
26	26035	Stored, awaiting overhaul	BR Blue, with full yellow ends	
27	D5353	Operational	BR Green, with yellow warning panels	
27	D5370	Operational	BR Green, with yellow warning panels	

== Diesel-electric multiple units ==
The following diesel-electric multiple units are based at the Caledonian Railway:

Class	Number	Status	Livery	Image
205	1128			
205	1132	Operational		
