= Justinhaugh railway station =

Disused railway station in Justinhaugh, Angus

Justinhaugh

General information
- Location: Justinhaugh, Angus; Scotland
- Coordinates: 56.6998°N 2.881°W
- Grid reference: NO461568
- Platforms: 2

Other information
- Status: Disused

History
- Original company: Caledonian Railway
- Pre-grouping: Caledonian Railway
- Post-grouping: London, Midland and Scottish Railway

Key dates
- 1 June 1895: Opened
- 4 August 1952: Closed
Location

Justinhaugh railway station served the hamlet of Justinhaugh, Angus, Scotland, from 1895 to 1952 on the Forfar and Brechin Railway.

== History ==
The station was opened on 1 June 1895 by the Caledonian Railway, although a pre-opening reference from 25 October 1894 erroneous called it Oathlaw. On the westbound platform was the station building, to the west was the goods yard and on the west side of the eastbound platform was the signal box. Inside the yard was the station cottage. The station closed on 4 August 1952.

Preceding station	Disused railways	Following station
Terminus	Caledonian Railway; Forfar and Brechin Railway	Tannadice; Line and station closed
