= Tannadice railway station =

Disused railway station in Tannadice, Angus

Tannadice

General information
- Location: Tannadice, Angus; Scotland
- Coordinates: 56.714°N 2.8401°W
- Grid reference: NO486583
- Platforms: 1

Other information
- Status: Disused

History
- Original company: Caledonian Railway
- Pre-grouping: Caledonian Railway
- Post-grouping: London, Midland and Scottish Railway; British Railways (Scottish Region)

Key dates
- 1 June 1895: Opened
- 4 August 1952: Closed
Location

Tannadice railway station served the village of Tannadice, Angus, Scotland, from 1895 to 1952 on the Forfar and Brechin Railway.

== History ==
The station was opened on 1 June 1895 by the Caledonian Railway. On the platform was the station building and opposite of it was a pair of sidings. Despite its name, the station was situated 1.5 miles away from the village, instead being situated closer to Tannadyce House. The remote location meant that patronage was low, so it closed on 4 August 1952.

| Preceding station | Disused railways | Following station |
|---|---|---|
| Justinhaugh; Line and station closed | Caledonian Railway; Forfar and Brechin Railway | Careston; Line and station closed |
