= Broomfield Junction Halt railway station =

Disused railway station in Montrose, Angus

Coordinates: 56.7241°N 2.4635°W

Broomfield Junction Halt
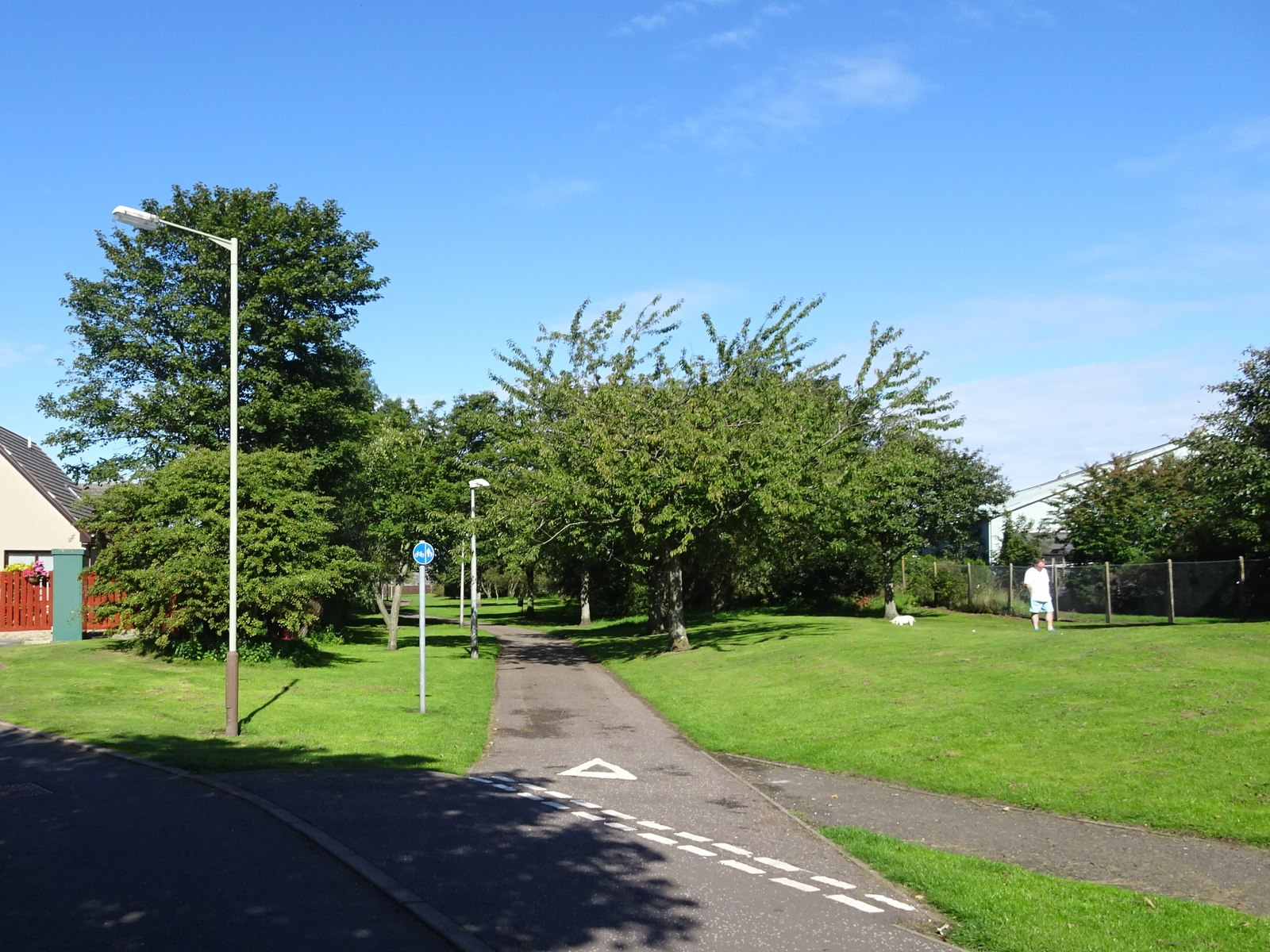
- The site of the station, looking north towards Dubton, in 2018

General information
- Location: Montrose, Angus; Scotland
- Platforms: 1

Other information
- Status: Disused

History
- Original company: Great North of Scotland Railway

Key dates
- 1 November 1865: Opened
- November 1877: Closed
Location

Broomfield Junction Halt railway station served the town of Montrose, Angus, Scotland from 1865 to 1877 on the Montrose and Bervie Railway.

== History ==
The station opened on 1 November 1865 by the Great North of Scotland Railway. It closed to both passengers and goods traffic in 1877.

Preceding station	Disused railways	Following station
Montrose (Caledonian); Line and station closed	Great North of Scotland Railway; Montrose and Bervie Railway	North Water Bridge Halt; Line and station closed
Montrose (Caledonian); Line and station closed	Great North of Scotland Railway; Aberdeen Railway	Dubton; Line and station closed
