= Marykirk railway station =

Disused railway station in Marykirk, Kincardineshire

Coordinates: 56.7988°N 2.512248°W

Marykirk

General information
- Location: Marykirk, Kincardineshire; Scotland
- Platforms: 2

Other information
- Status: Disused

History
- Original company: Aberdeen Railway
- Pre-grouping: Aberdeen Railway; Caledonian Railway
- Post-grouping: London, Midland and Scottish Railway

Key dates
- 1 November 1849: Opened
- 11 June 1956: Closed

Marykirk railway station served the village of Marykirk, Kincardineshire, Scotland from 1849 to 1956 on the Aberdeen Railway.

== History ==
The station opened on 1 November 1849 by the Aberdeen Railway. To the north was a goods shed which was on the west of the line. The station closed to both passengers and goods traffic on 11 June 1956.

Preceding station	Historical railways	Following station
Laurencekirk; Line and station open	Aberdeen Railway	Craigo; Line open, station closed
