= Stracathro railway station =

Former railway station in Scotland

Stracathro

General information
- Location: Stracathro, Angus; Scotland
- Coordinates: 56.779°N 2.651°W
- Grid reference: NO603655
- Platforms: 1

Other information
- Status: Disused

History
- Original company: Brechin and Edzell District Railway
- Pre-grouping: Caledonian Railway
- Post-grouping: London, Midland and Scottish Railway

Key dates
- 18 November 1863: Station opened
- 1 October 1912: Renamed Dunlappie
- 1 November 1912: Renamed Stracathro
- 27 April 1931: Station closed temporarily
- 4 July 1938: Station reopened
- 27 September 1938: Station closed to passengers
- 7 September 1964: Station and line closed completely
Location

Stracathro railway station served the sparsely populated rural area around the villages of Stracathro and Inchbare as well as Dunlappie and other estates in Angus, Scotland from 1896 to 1964 on the Brechin and Edzell District Railway. The station was opened as Inchbare and then renamed Dunlappie before finally being named Stracathro.

== History ==
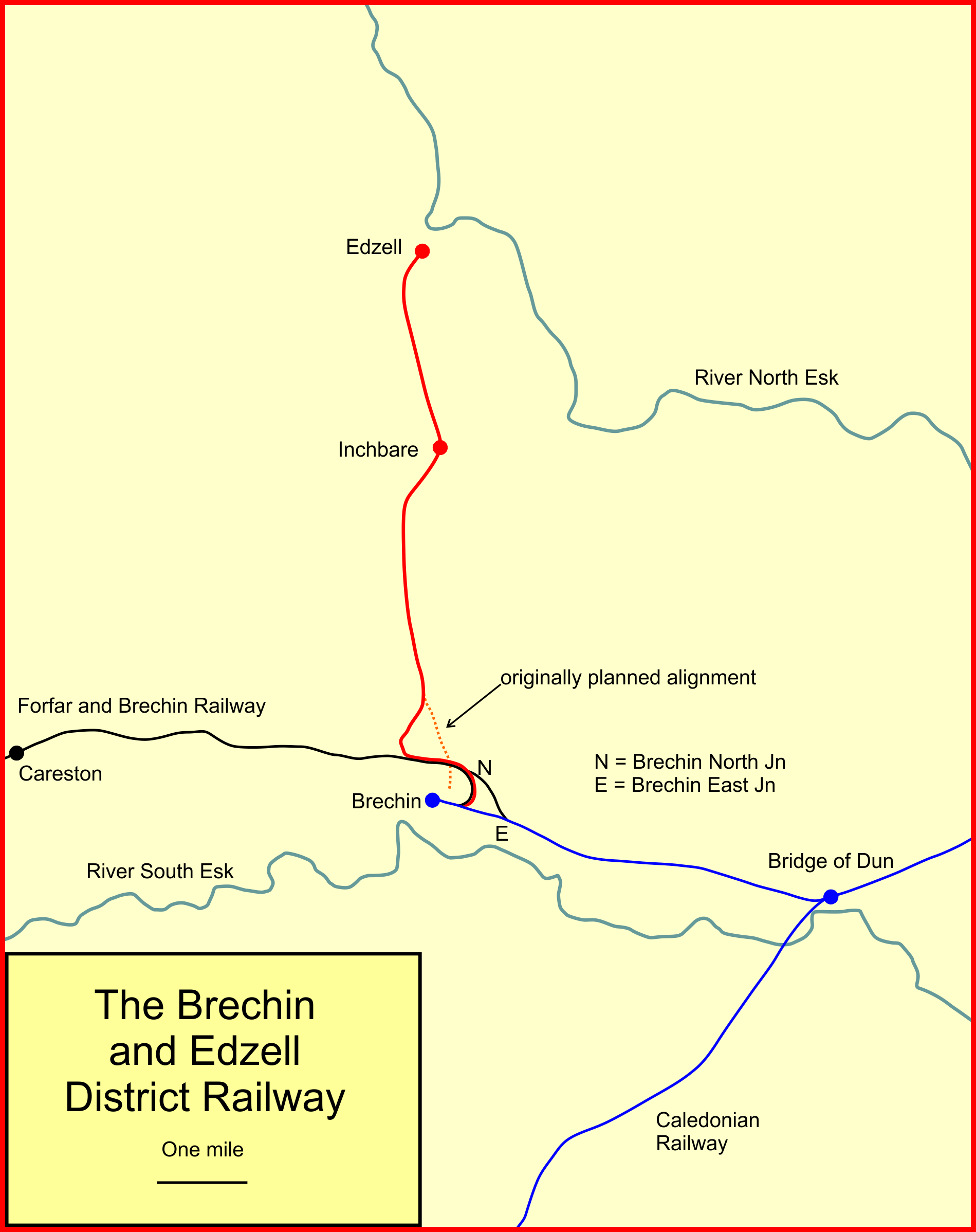
The Edzell Branch

The station opened to goods on 1 June 1896 and to passengers on 8 June 1896 on the Brechin and Edzell District Railway as Inchbare. It was the only intermediate stop on the line to Edzell that had been built by the Forfar and Brechin Railway(F&BR)company but operated by the Caledonian Railway. The F&BR remained independent until the 1923 grouping when it was incorporated into the London, Midland and Scottish Railway.

The station, along with the line, was originally closed to passengers on 27 April 1931. A resumption of train services was trialed on 4 July 1938 but ceased two months later, on 27 September 1938, due to lack of patronage by the London, Midland and Scottish Railway. The station and line finally closed to goods traffic on 7 September 1964.

== Infrastructure ==
The station had a single platform on the eastern side of the line. A level crossing stood to the north, just beyond the passing loop, with a gate box for the operator and a footbridge to the station for use when the level crossing was closed to road traffic. The signal box stood on the western side about halfway along the passing loop. In 1921 the loop became a siding with part of the western lifted and the approach made from the south. A station workers house stood near the level crossing. Several sidings lay on the eastern side with a weighing machine, a crane and goods yard buildings, although no apparent rail served goods shed is present. The ticket office and waiting room was fairly substantial and stood nearer to the northern end of the platform.

== The site today ==
Few signs remain of the trackbed however on the station footprint private houses now stand and parts of the station buildings may have been incorporated into one or two of them. The old station workers house next to the road remains, standing near to the Auchenreoch House entrance lodge.

== Notes ==
| Preceding station | Historical railways | Following station |
|---|---|---|
| Brechin | Caledonian Railway; Brechin and Edzell District Railway | Edzell |
