= Edzell railway station =

Disused railway station in Edzell, Angus

Edzell
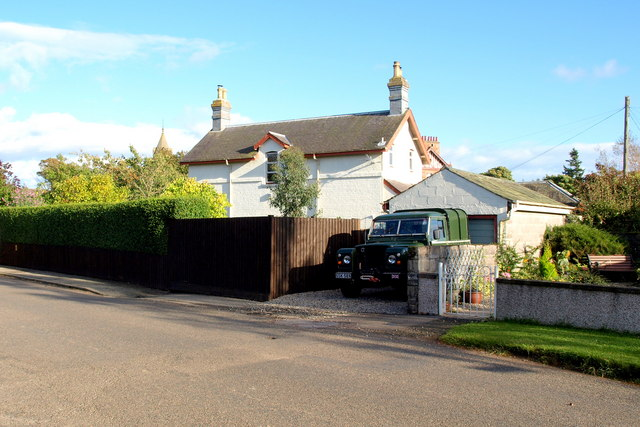
- The station house, near the station, in 2008

General information
- Location: Edzell, Angus; Scotland
- Coordinates: 56.807°N 2.6556°W
- Grid reference: NO600685
- Platforms: 2

Other information
- Status: Disused

History
- Original company: Brechin and Edzell District Railway
- Pre-grouping: Caledonian Railway
- Post-grouping: London, Midland and Scottish Railway

Key dates
- 8 June 1896: Opened
- 27 April 1931: Closed temporarily
- 4 July 1938: Reopened
- 27 September 1938: Closed to passengers
- 7 September 1964: Closed completely
Location

Edzell railway station served the village of Edzell, Angus, Scotland from 1896 to 1964 on the Brechin and Edzell District Railway.

== History ==
The station opened on 8 June 1896 by the Brechin and Edzell District Railway. It was the northern terminus of the line, situated north of Stracathro railway station. The station, along with the line, closed to passengers on 27 April 1931. A plan to resume these services took place on 4 July 1938 but it failed and it closed 2 months later, on 27 September 1938. The station closed, along with the line, to goods traffic on 7 September 1964.

Preceding station	Disused railways	Following station
Terminus	Brechin and Edzell District Railway	Stracathro; Line and station closed
