= Muchalls railway station =

Disused railway station in Muchalls, Kincardineshire

Muchalls

General information
- Location: Muchalls, Kincardineshire; Scotland
- Coordinates: 57.0184°N 2.1632°W
- Grid reference: NO901919
- Platforms: 2

Other information
- Status: Disused

History
- Original company: Aberdeen Railway
- Pre-grouping: Aberdeen Railway; Caledonian Railway
- Post-grouping: London, Midland and Scottish Railway

Key dates
- 1 February 1850: Opened
- 4 December 1950: Closed

Muchalls railway station served the village of Muchalls, Kincardineshire, Scotland from 1849 to 1950 on the Aberdeen Railway.

== History ==
The station was opened on 1 February 1850 by the Aberdeen Railway. There was a goods yard at the east side of the line.

The station was host to a LMS caravan from 1936 to 1939.

The station closed to both passengers and goods traffic on 4 December 1950. Freight service was transferred to Newtonhill railway station.

Nothing remains of the station, however its location can be best estimated by the location of the Muchalls Peace Sign, which is located nearby. The peace sign is visible from Marine Terrace, Muchalls just south of the junction with Walker Drive.

| Preceding station | Historical railways | Following station |
|---|---|---|
| Newtonhill; Line open, station closed | Aberdeen Railway | Limpet Mill; Line open, station closed |
