= Careston =

Hamlet in Angus, Scotland

Coordinates: 56.732905°N 2.764892°W

- Location within Angus
- OS grid reference: NO533604
- Council area: Angus
- Lieutenancy area: Angus
- Country: Scotland
- Sovereign state: United Kingdom
- Post town: BRECHIN
- Postcode district: DD9
- Dialling code: 01356
- Police: Scotland
- Fire: Scottish
- Ambulance: Scottish
- UK Parliament: Angus
- Scottish Parliament: Angus North and Mearns

Careston is a hamlet in Angus, Scotland, that is in the parish of the same name, 5 miles west of Brechin. The parish and hamlet supposedly took their name from a stone laid in commemoration of a Danish chieftain, called Caraldston.

It has a castle and church, although the local primary school closed in 2004.

Careston railway station on the Forfar and Brechin Railway once served the hamlet.

== Careston Church ==
The parish Church was built in 1636 by Sir Alexander Carnegy of Balnamoon. Until that time, the community fell within the parish of Brechin. Few made the travel to Brechin to worship, and so Sir Alexander decided to build a church at Careston, and began proceedings to have the lands of his estate disjoined from the parish of Brechin. In 1641, the parish of Careston was formally erected by the Estates of Parliament.

The parish was one of the smallest in Scotland, by population and size - with only four parishes smaller.

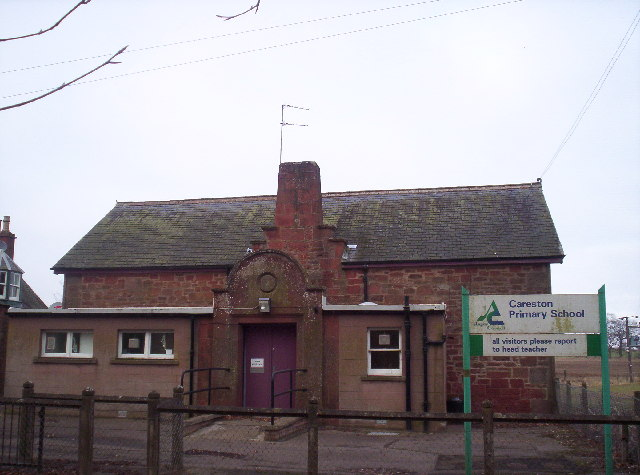
The former primary school in Careston, photographed in 2006

== Sources ==
- Careston in the Gazetteer for Scotland.
