= Careston railway station =

Disused railway station in Careston, Angus

Careston
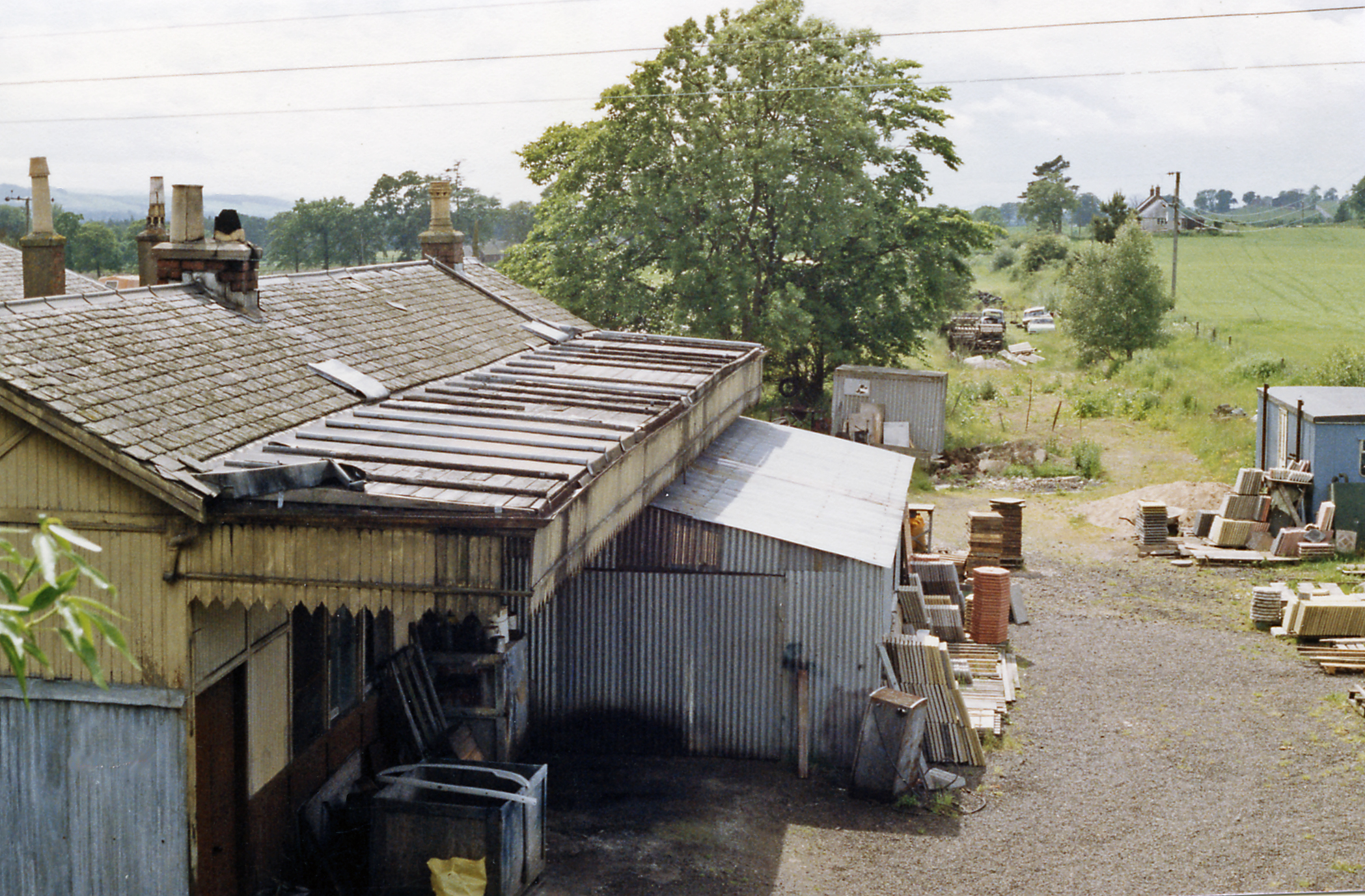
- The site of the station in 1988

General information
- Location: Careston, Angus; Scotland
- Coordinates: 56.7379°N 2.7575°W
- Grid reference: NO537609
- Platforms: 2

Other information
- Status: Disused

History
- Original company: Caledonian Railway
- Pre-grouping: Caledonian Railway
- Post-grouping: London, Midland and Scottish Railway; British Railways (Scottish Region)

Key dates
- 1 June 1895: Opened
- 4 August 1952: Closed to passengers
- 7 September 1964: Closed to goods
Location

Careston railway station served the hamlet of Careston, Angus, Scotland. It operated from 1895 to 1964 on the Forfar and Brechin Railway.

== History ==
The station was opened on 1 June 1895 by the Caledonian Railway. On the westbound platform was the station building, to the south was the goods yard, and at the west end of the westbound platform was the signal box. The station closed to passengers on 4 August 1952 and closed to goods on 7 September 1964.

Preceding station	Disused railways	Following station
Tannadice; Line and station closed	Caledonian Railway; Forfar and Brechin Railway	Terminus
