= Craigo =

Coordinates: 56.771041°N 2.510435°W

- Location within Angus
- OS grid reference: NO689645
- Council area: Angus
- Lieutenancy area: Angus
- Country: Scotland
- Sovereign state: United Kingdom
- Post town: MONTROSE
- Postcode district: DD10
- Dialling code: 01674
- Police: Scotland
- Fire: Scottish
- Ambulance: Scottish
- UK Parliament: Angus
- Scottish Parliament: Angus North and Mearns

Craigo is a village in Angus, Scotland. It lies about 5 miles (8.0 km) northwest of Montrose, and 1 mile (1.6 km) south of Marykirk, which is across the River North Esk in Aberdeenshire. Craigo developed in the 19th century as a textile village.
