= Bridge of Dun railway station =

Disused railway station in Scotland

Bridge of Dun
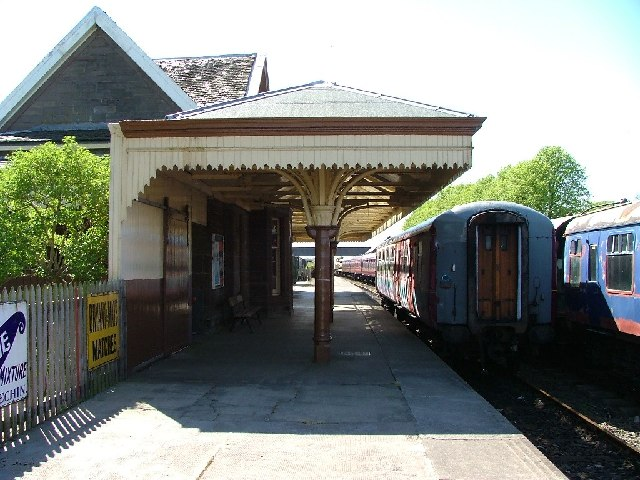
- Bridge of Dun Railway Station, May 2005

General information
- Location: Bridge of Dun, Angus; Scotland
- Coordinates: 56.7186°N 2.5500°W
- Grid reference: NO664586
- System: Station on heritage railway
- Manager: Caledonian Railway (Brechin)
- Platforms: 3

History
- Original company: Aberdeen Railway
- Pre-grouping: Caledonian Railway
- Post-grouping: LMS

Key dates
- 1 February 1848: Opened
- 4 September 1967: Closed to passengers
- 1981: Closed to all traffic
- 1993: Re-opened by Caledonian Railway (Brechin)
Location

Bridge of Dun is a privately owned station in Angus in Eastern Scotland. The adjacent platforms and line are independently operated as a preserved railway by the Caledonian Railway (Brechin) Ltd.

== History ==
The station was originally opened by the Aberdeen Railway, on what became the northern stage of the Caledonian Railway Route to the North from London to Aberdeen.

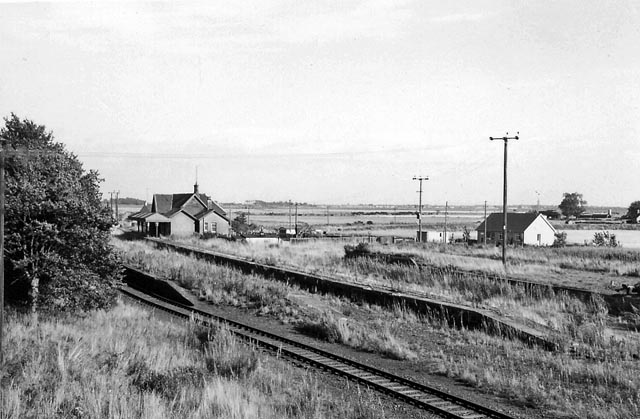
The station in 1974

In 2017, the footbridge from Dunblane railway station was moved to Bridge of Dun. The footbridge dated from 1895, and was Category C listed.

Preceding station	Heritage railways	Following station
Brechin Terminus	Caledonian Railway	Terminus
Historical railways
Brechin	Caledonian Railway; Aberdeen Railway	Dubton
Farnell Road	Caledonian Railway; Aberdeen Railway	Dubton
