= Bridge of Dun =

Village in Angus, Scotland

Coordinates: 56.717778°N 2.551111°W

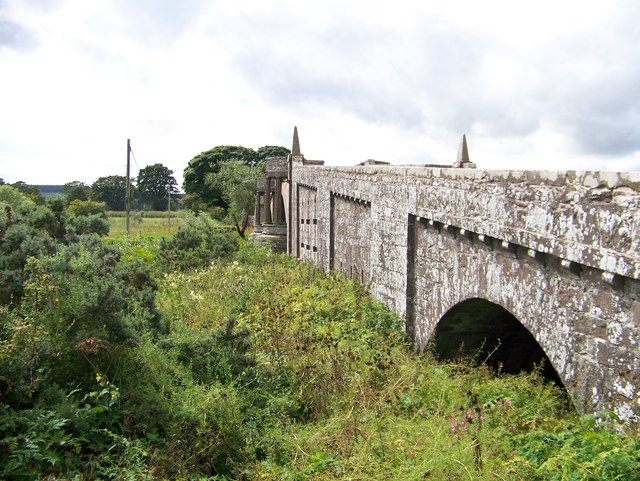
- The Bridge of Dun

- Location within Angus
- OS grid reference: NO521558
- Council area: Angus
- Lieutenancy area: Angus
- Country: Scotland
- Sovereign state: United Kingdom
- Post town: FORFAR
- Postcode district: DD8
- Dialling code: 01307
- Police: Scotland
- Fire: Scottish
- Ambulance: Scottish
- UK Parliament: Angus and Perthshire Glens
- Scottish Parliament: Angus North and Mearns

Bridge of Dun is a village in Angus, Scotland, located north of the River South Esk and south of the A935 road from Brechin to Montrose.

== History ==
The village's 19th-century railway footbridge was restored in 2014. In October 2023, Storm Babet caused destructive flooding to hit the area. A sinkhole appeared on the eponymous Bridge of Dun, which was built between 1785 and 1787.

== Transportation ==
- Bridge of Dun railway station
