= Limpet Mill railway station =

Disused railway station in Kincardineshire, Scotland

Coordinates: 56.988979°N 2.183361°W

Limpet Mill

General information
- Location: Kincardineshire; Scotland
- Platforms: 2

Other information
- Status: Disused

History
- Original company: Aberdeen Railway

Key dates
- 1 November 1849: Opened
- 1 April 1850: Closed

Limpet Mill was a railway station in Kincardineshire, Scotland from 1849 to 1850 on the Aberdeen Railway.

== History ==
This station was opened on 1 November 1849 by the Aberdeen Railway. It was a temporary terminus, with coach connections to Portlethen and Aberdeen. It operated for five months, as the railway was extended and a new terminus, Aberdeen Ferryhill railway station, was opened on 1 April 1850.

Preceding station	Historical railways	Following station
Muchalls; Line open, station closed	Aberdeen Railway	Stonehaven; Line and station open
