= James Blyth (engineer) =

Scottish electrical engineer and academic

Professor James Blyth FRSE FRSSA
- Born: 4 April 1839; Marykirk, Kincardineshire
- Died: 15 May 1906 (aged 67); Glasgow, Renfrewshire
- Occupation: Engineer
- Known for: Early pioneer of generation of electricity by wind power

James Blyth (4 April 1839 – 15 May 1906) was a Scottish electrical engineer and academic at Anderson's College, now the University of Strathclyde, in Glasgow. He was a pioneer in the field of electricity generation through wind power and his wind turbine, which was used to light his holiday home in Marykirk in Aberdeenshire, was the world's first-known structure by which electricity was generated from wind power. Blyth patented his design and later developed an improved model which served as an emergency power source at Montrose Lunatic Asylum, Infirmary & Dispensary for the next 30 years. Although Blyth received recognition for his contributions to science, electricity generation by wind power was considered uneconomical and no more wind turbines were built in the United Kingdom until 1951, some 64 years after Blyth built his first prototype.

== Early life ==
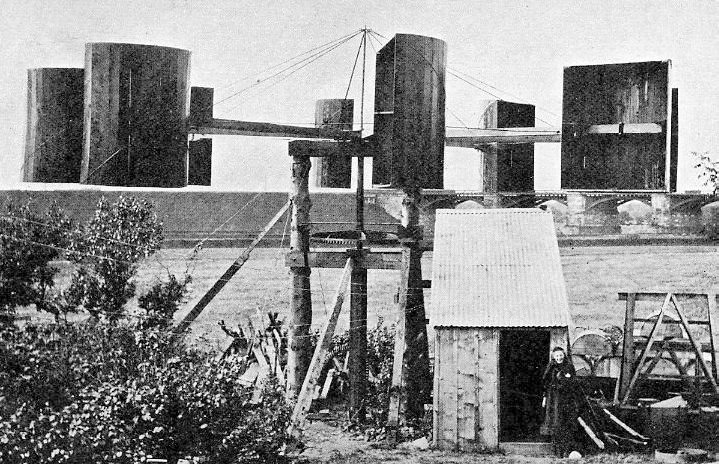
One of Blyth's "windmills" at his cottage in Marykirk in 1891

James Blyth was born in Marykirk, Kincardineshire, on 4 April 1839 to John Blyth, an innkeeper and small farmer, and his wife Catherine. He attended the Marykirk parish school and later, the Montrose Academy before winning a scholarship to the General Assembly Normal School, Edinburgh in 1856. After graduating as a Bachelor of Arts from The University of Edinburgh in 1861, Blyth taught mathematics at Morrison's Academy in Crieff and established the technical and scientific curriculum for the newly established George Watson's College in Edinburgh.

Blyth completed his Master of Arts in 1871 and in the same year married Jesse Wilhelmena Taylor at the United Presbyterian Church in Athol Place, Edinburgh. They had two sons and five daughters, two of whom died in infancy.

== Career ==
"His students – gone forth from the classroom, and radiated over the country and to far corners of the world... all bear in the secret structure of their minds the impress of Professor Blyth's teaching, and will cherish through life, with reverence and affection, the memory of their teacher and friend."

— Obituary – Professor James Muir

In 1880 Blyth was appointed Freeland Professor of Natural Philosophy at Anderson's College, Glasgow, which became the Glasgow and West of Scotland Technical College in 1886. Whilst teaching at the technical college he pursued an active research programme with a particular interest in the generation and storage of electricity from wind power. Blyth was liked by his students and colleagues who admired his hard working nature, down-to-earth attitude and willingness to roll up his sleeves. He was also well known in the local community through a series of popular lectures and demonstrations.

In July 1887 Blyth built a cloth-sailed wind turbine (or "windmill") in the garden of his holiday cottage in Marykirk and used the electricity it produced to charge accumulators; the stored electricity was used to power the lights in his cottage, which thus became the first house in the world to be powered by wind-generated electricity. In a paper delivered to the Philosophical Society of Glasgow on 2 May 1888, Blyth described the wind turbine as being "of a tripod design, with a 33-foot windshaft, four arms of 13 feet with canvas sails, and a Burgin dynamo driven from the flywheel using a rope". The turbine produced enough power to light ten 25-volt bulbs in a "moderate breeze" and could even be used to power a small lathe.

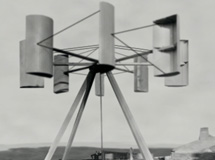
The 1895 turbine built for the Montrose Lunatic Asylum

Over the next few years Blyth experimented with a number of different designs. The final design operated for the next 25 years and produced surplus electricity which Blyth offered to the people of Marykirk to light the main street of the town. But his offer was rejected, as the people thought electricity was "the work of The Devil". Blyth was awarded a UK patent (GB19,401) for his "wind engine" in November 1891. In 1895 he licensed the Glasgow engineering company, Mavor and Coulson, to build a second, improved turbine, which was used to supply emergency power to the Lunatic Asylum, Infirmary and Dispensary of Montrose; the system operated successfully for the next 30 years.

Blyth's original wind generator was the first known structure by which electricity was generated from wind power, but its lack of a braking mechanism meant it was prone to damage in strong winds. In the winter of 1887, some months after Blyth's first wind generator was built, American, Charles F. Brush built the first automatically operated wind turbine. The design of Brush's machine allowed it to be shut down manually to protect it from wind damage. The improved design of the turbine built for the Montrose Lunatic Asylum (which was based on Thomas Robinson's anemometer design) went some way towards solving this problem but it could not be guaranteed to stall in very strong winds.

In 1891 Blyth presented a paper to the Royal Society of Edinburgh espousing his belief in the benefits of renewable energy sources, particularly wind but also wave energy. Later that year he was awarded the Brisbane Gold Medal by the Royal Scottish Society of Arts for his work in producing electrical energy from wind, but his wind turbine was not considered to be economically viable.

Blyth's other research interests included the relative efficiency of different forms of lighting, telephone communication, and microphones; he also contributed entries on a number of topics for the ninth edition of the Encyclopædia Britannica.

== Later life and death ==
Blyth's son, Vincent James (1874–1916), and his son-in-law, George Edwin Allan (1870–1955), both became demonstrators, assistants and lecturers in the Department of Natural Philosophy. Blyth himself was awarded an honorary doctorate by the University of Glasgow in 1900. He died from apoplexy at his home in Glasgow on 15 May 1906. His friend James Colville remembered him as "a true man of science...one who by insight, patient toil, and mechanical ingenuity did much in his day to explain and illustrate many of the facts of physical science."

== Legacy ==
The Professor James Blyth Memorial Committee, composed of Blyth's former students and associates, was established in March 1907 to raise funds for a memorial to him. The memorial eventually took the form of endowing the Blyth Memorial Prizes, and erecting a wall plaque in the college. The turbine at Montrose Asylum was dismantled in 1914. Britain's first public utility wind turbine did not come into operation until 1951, when a prototype turbine built by John Brown Engineering of Glasgow was installed at Costa Head, Orkney.

== Honours ==
In 2021 he was posthumously inducted into the Scottish Engineering Hall of Fame.

== Publications ==
- Blyth, James On the application of wind power to the generation and storage of electricity, Paper read before the Philosophical Society of Glasgow, 2 May 1888
- Blyth, James On the application of wind power to the production of electric currents, Transactions of the Royal Scottish Society of Arts, vol. 13, (1894), pp. 170–181. Paper read before the Society on 25 January 1892

== See also ==
- History of wind power
- Wind power in Scotland
- Wind turbine
