= Tannadice, Angus =

Coordinates: 56.711628°N 2.859206°W

Tannadice
- Location within Angus
- OS grid reference: NO475581
- Council area: Angus
- Lieutenancy area: Angus
- Country: Scotland
- Sovereign state: United Kingdom
- Post town: FORFAR
- Postcode district: DD8
- Dialling code: 01307
- Police: Scotland
- Fire: Scottish
- Ambulance: Scottish
- UK Parliament: Angus
- Scottish Parliament: Angus North and Mearns

Tannadice (Scots pronunciation: [ˈtanəˌdəis]) is a village in Angus, Scotland that lies on the River South Esk and is 4 miles north of Forfar. The estate of Tannadice was formerly owned by William Neish of Tannadice and Clepington. Jock Neish Scout Centre at Tannadice was built on the family's lands and named for William Neish's grandson.

Tannadice railway station on the Forfar and Brechin Railway once served the village.

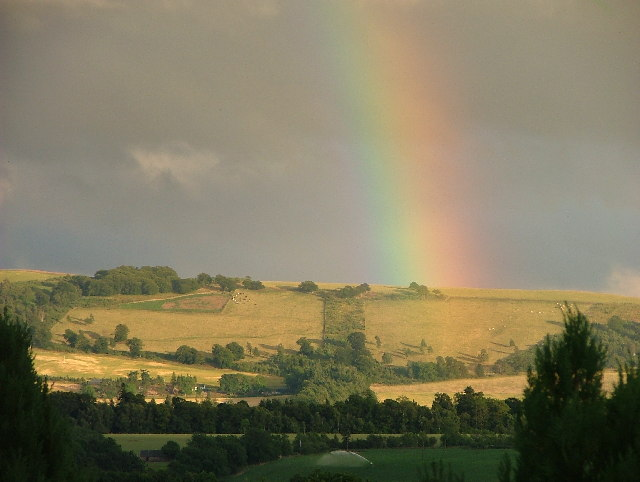
Finavon Hill from Tannadice

== Sources ==
- Tannadice in the Gazetteer for Scotland.
