= Dubton railway station =

Disused railway station in Montrose, Angus

Dubton

General information
- Location: Montrose, Angus; Scotland
- Coordinates: 56.7372°N 2.4907°W
- Grid reference: NO700607
- Platforms: 3

Other information
- Status: Disused

History
- Original company: Aberdeen Railway
- Pre-grouping: Caledonian Railway
- Post-grouping: London, Midland and Scottish Railway

Key dates
- 1 February 1848: Opened
- 4 August 1952: Closed to passengers
- 4 September 1967: Closed completely
Location

Dubton railway station (also known as Dubton Junction railway station) served the village of Hillside, Scotland and the nearby hamlet of Dubton, after which it is named. The station was open from 1848 to 1967 on the main Aberdeen Railway line from Bridge of Dun to Aberdeen.

== History ==
The station opened on 1 February 1848 on the Aberdeen Railway. It closed to passengers on 4 August 1952 and completely on 4 September 1967.

| Preceding station | Historical railways | Following station |
|---|---|---|
| Craigo; Line and station closed | Aberdeen Railway | Bridge of Dun; Line closed, station open |
| Montrose (C.R.); Line and station closed | Aberdeen Railway | Bridge of Dun; Line closed, station open |
