= Brechin and Edzell District Railway =

Railway in Scotland

The Brechin and Edzell District Railway was a local line in Scotland connecting Edzell, then a developing tourist centre, to the nearby main population centre of Brechin, where there was a branch of the Caledonian Railway. The short line opened in 1896, and it was worked by the Caledonian Railway.

The sparse local population did not sustain the line long, and passenger services were withdrawn in 1931; an experimental resumption in 1938 was brief and unsuccessful. Goods services continued, and construction at an RAF base in the early 1960s brought some business but the line closed completely in 1964.

== History ==
=== Early proposals ===
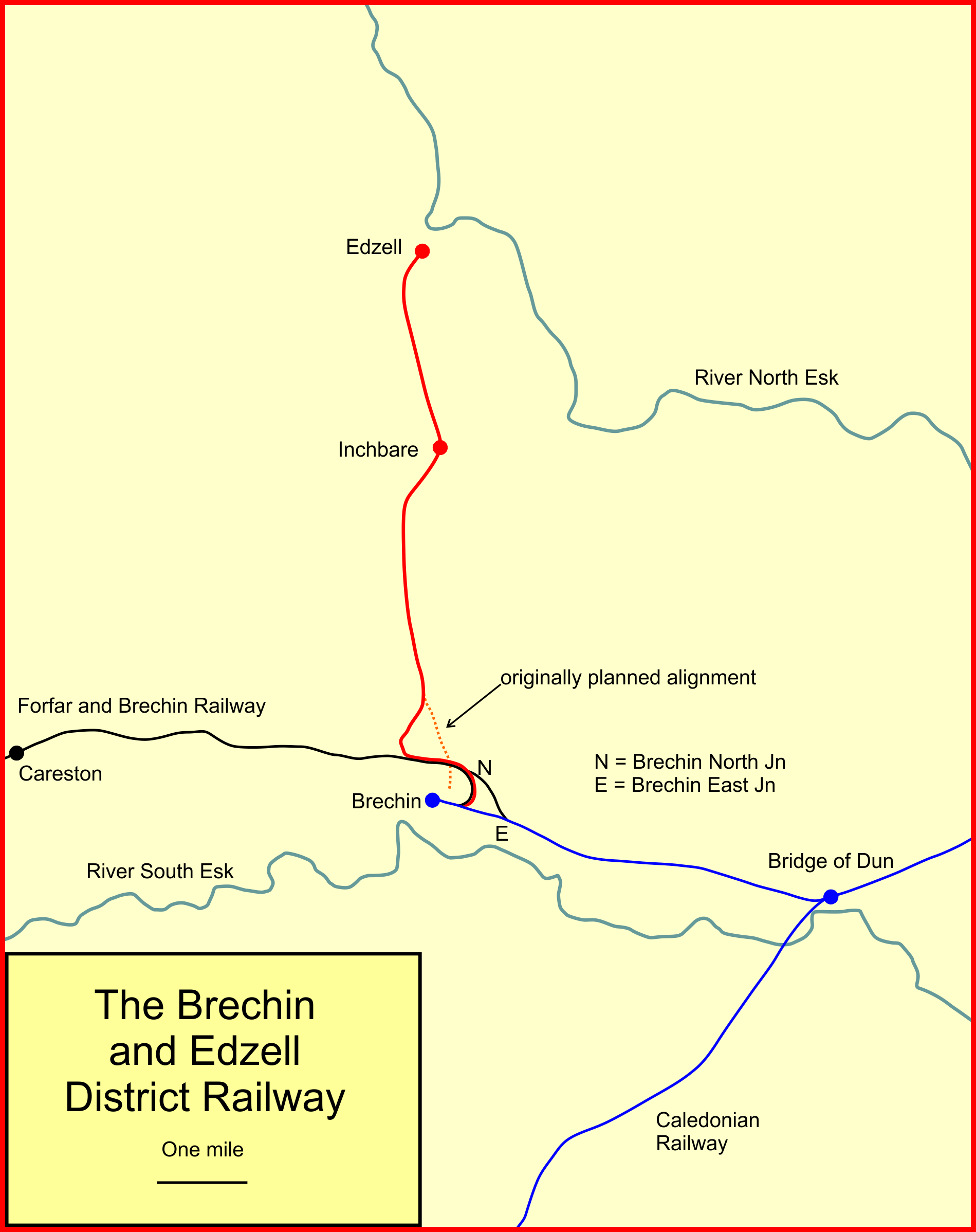
System map of the Brechin and Edzell District Railway

Brechin was an important town but its manufacturing output, and its requirement for coal and agricultural minerals, were stifled because of the difficulty of transport to and from the nearest harbour where coastal shipping was available: Montrose. Robert Stevenson was commissioned in 1819 to report on a means of transport between Brechin and Montrose. Brechin was a natural distribution centre for the locality, and the local sandstone was in demand for the construction of buildings in London. A canal was proposed but the topography of the district was a problem, and Stevenson recommended consideration of an iron railway. The primitive locomotives of the day were inadequate for the gradients encountered, but Stevenson proposed several alternatives, including a route consisting of level sections with intermediate inclined planes worked by stationary engines, and a route that descended from Brechin on a steady gradient of 1 in 414. Stevenson admitted that some of his proposals were technically unproven, and passenger revenue was forecast to be only £50 per annum. Stevenson's plan was not adopted.

Promoters in Brechin revived the idea of a railway in 1836, when they called in the engineering consultants Grainger and Miller. A viable survey was presented, but it was not immediately adopted, and a revised scheme was surveyed in 1839 by which time a new wet dock was being built in Montrose. The 1839 scheme was not adopted and once again nothing was done.

=== The Aberdeen Railway ===
The frenzy of railway speculation in the 1840s led to a number of railway schemes in the northern areas of Scotland. It was thought important to link Aberdeen to the planned network further south, and it began to become clear that Perth was going to be a focus. Perth was the lowest crossing point on the River Tay, and bridging the Firth at any lower point presented challenges beyond the technological capability of the time.

Railways already existed from Dundee to Forfar: the Dundee and Arbroath Railway and the Arbroath and Forfar Railway had been opened in 1838, although their planned link at Arbroath had not been constructed. Now a railway was planned to run from Perth to Forfar: this became the Scottish Midland Junction Railway (SMJR) and was authorised by Parliament in 1845. Another line was promoted to reach Aberdeen, and there was controversy over the route. One scheme was to run from Forfar to Aberdeen by way of Brechin, but an alternative was to leave the existing Arboath and Forfar line near Friockheim, a few miles from Arbroath and take a course that by-passed Brechin. The second scheme would shorten the mileage of new construction required, but Brechin would only be served by a branch line. The population of Brechin in 1841 was 3,951.

The second scheme was the one adopted, and the Aberdeen Railway obtained Parliamentary authority on that basis on 31 July 1845, the same day as the SMJR.

The Aberdeen Railway opened part of its main line on 1 February 1848, from Friockheim to Bridge of Dun and Dubton; there were branches, opened at the same time, to Brechin (from Bridge of Dun) and Montrose (from Dubton). Although Brechin was not on the main line, it had its connection to Montrose. The Aberdeen Railway had run out of money at this point and it was not until 1 February 1850 that it reached Aberdeen, and even then this was a temporary terminus at Ferryhill, on the outskirts of the Burgh. The Brechin station was on the east side of the town, facing Montrose.

=== A railway to Edzell ===
Brechin and Edzell District Railway Act 1890
- Act of Parliament
- Parliament of the United Kingdom
- Long title: An Act to authorise the construction of a Railway in the County of Forfar to be called the Brechin and Edzell District Railway.
- Citation: 53 & 54 Vict. c. cxx

Dates
- Royal assent: 25 July 1890

Text of statute as originally enacted

Brechin had a railway, and in the later decades of the nineteenth century, Edzell, a small village a few miles north of Brechin, had established itself as a popular holiday centre, and this led to thoughts of connecting it with the railway network at Brechin. The population of Edzell parish was less than 1,000 in 1891. A railway was proposed in 1889, and the Brechin and Edzell District Railway Act 1890 (53 & 54 Vict. c. cxx) was given royal assent on 4 August 1890. The capital was £50,000.

Brechin and Edzell District Railway Act 1893
- Act of Parliament
- Parliament of the United Kingdom
- Long title: An Act to authorise the Brechin and Edzell District Railway Company to make substituted railways to abandon portions of their authorised railway to extend the time for purchase of lands and completion of works to raise additional capital and for other purposes.
- Citation: 56 & 57 Vict. c. clix

Dates
- Royal assent: 25 July 1890

Text of statute as originally enacted

In the same parliamentary session, the Forfar and Brechin Railway (F&BR) was authorised. This was seen as a possible alternative main line route to Aberdeen (although later difficulties with agreeing a route in Forfar prevented the design of a route avoiding reversal there). The existing Brechin terminus built by the Aberdeen Railway, by now absorbed into the Caledonian Railway, was not suitable for altering into a through station, and the F&BR was to join the Brechin to Bridge of Dun line east of Brechin. This cut across the authorised Edzell line, and the Brechin and Edzell company had to get an act of Parliament modifying their route to make it compatible; they did so in 1893 with the Brechin and Edzell District Railway Act 1893 (56 & 57 Vict. c. clix). They had originally intended an independent terminus, but the 1893 act authorised their use of the Caledonian station.

The short line took some time to build; it was inspected by Colonel York for the Board of Trade on 30 May 1896 and passed; it opened to goods trains on 1 June 1896 and to passengers on 8 June 1896. There was one intermediate station, at Inchbare, and the Caledonian Railway worked the line for 50% of gross receipts.

There were eight daily return passenger trains in the 1920s.

The railway was worked by the Caledonian Railway as a branch of its own network; the original B&EDR company remained independent, simply collecting the lease charge, until the grouping of the railways in 1923, following the Railways Act 1921. The company was then absorbed into the new London Midland and Scottish Railway.

=== Closure ===
The passenger service on the line never developed, and passenger trains were discontinued after 27 April 1931. An experimental resumption took place on 4 July 1938 but this was unsuccessful, and final passenger closure took place on 27 September 1938.

A light goods service continued, sustained in later years by the upgrading of RAF Edzell for a US Air Force base; however finally on 7 September 1964 the goods service ceased, and the Edzell branch closed completely.

== Topography ==
The line was 6.5 miles (9 km) long. Approaching Brechin the line curved eastward, joining the Forfar and Brechin line at Brechin North Junction; the combined route then curved round the east end of the town to enter the original Aberdeen Railway terminus. The final approach to Brechin station was on a steep falling gradient.

The line opened on 8 June 1896 and closed to passengers on 27 April 1931; it reopened to passengers on 4 July 1938 and closed finally to passengers on 27 September 1938; it closed completely on 7 September 1964.

Stations and locations:

- Edzell;
- Inchbare; renamed Dunlappie October 1912; renamed Stracathro November 1912;
- Brechin North Junction'; Forfar line trailed in;
- Brechin; former Aberdeen Railway station.

The authorised Forfar and Brechin line by-passed Brechin station, continuing eastwards to join the Bridge of Dun line. The Edzell line joined that alignment west of Brechin North Junction and the two single lines ran alongside one another to the North Junction signal box, where they merged to a double track, which immediately turned south and west to enter Brechin station. The three routes together formed a triangle, the F&B line being described as the Brechin avoiding line. In fact this was never signalled as a running line: the junction at the east end of the "avoiding line" was simply a ground frame controlled connection; it was never used for passenger traffic. The avoiding line was closed in 1917 when the track materials were requisitioned for use in hostilities during World War I.

On 25 February 1934 Brechin North Junction signal box was abolished, and the Edzell and Forfar routes were operated as adjacent single lines to Brechin station; the speed restriction down the gradient into Brechin was 12 mph.

Brechin North Junction signal box controlled the convergence of the Edzell and Forfar lines; a double track ran from there to Brechin station.
