= Marykirk =

Village in Aberdeenshire, Scotland, UK

Coordinates: 56.7816°N 2.5155°W

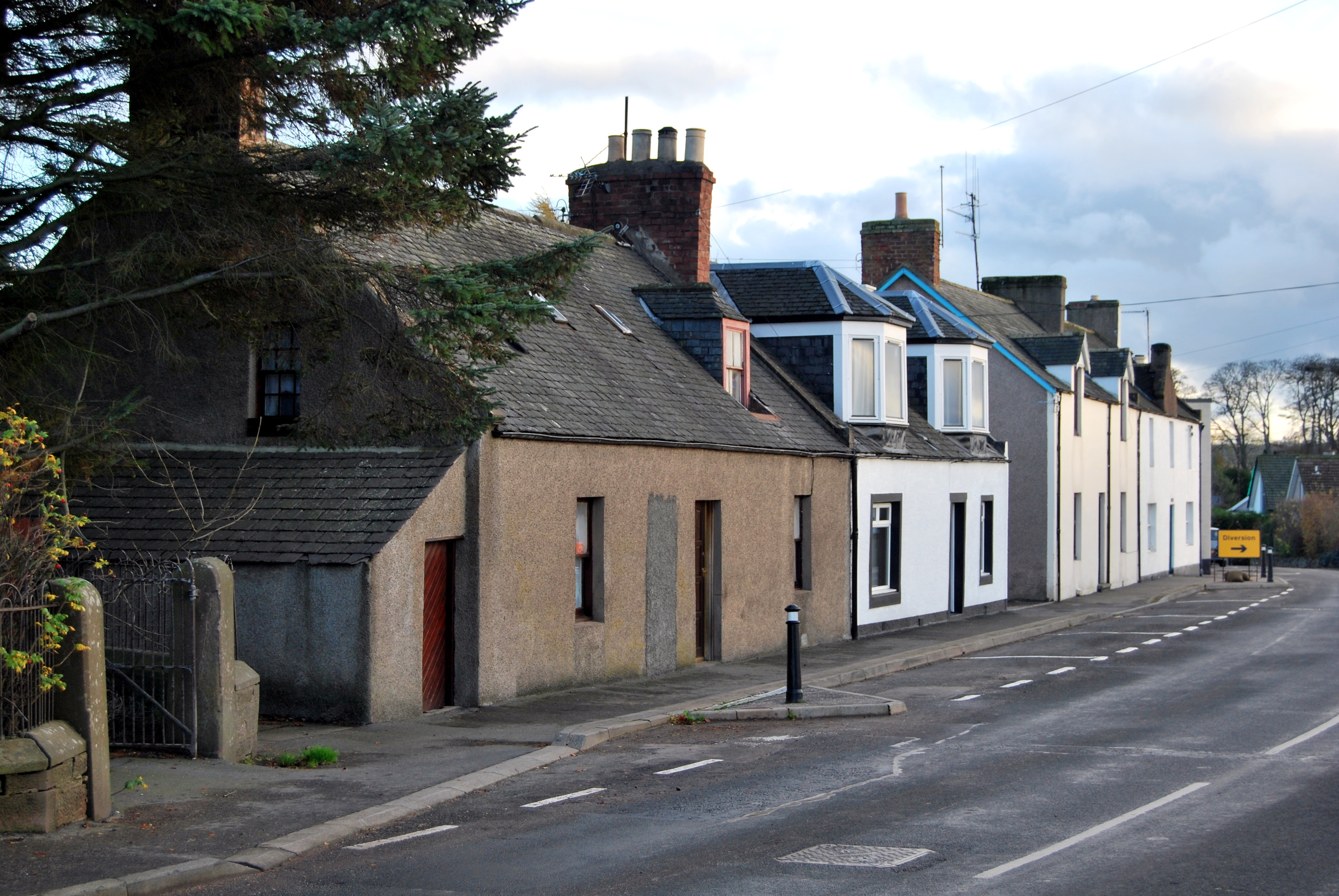
Marykirk High Street after floods, November 2009

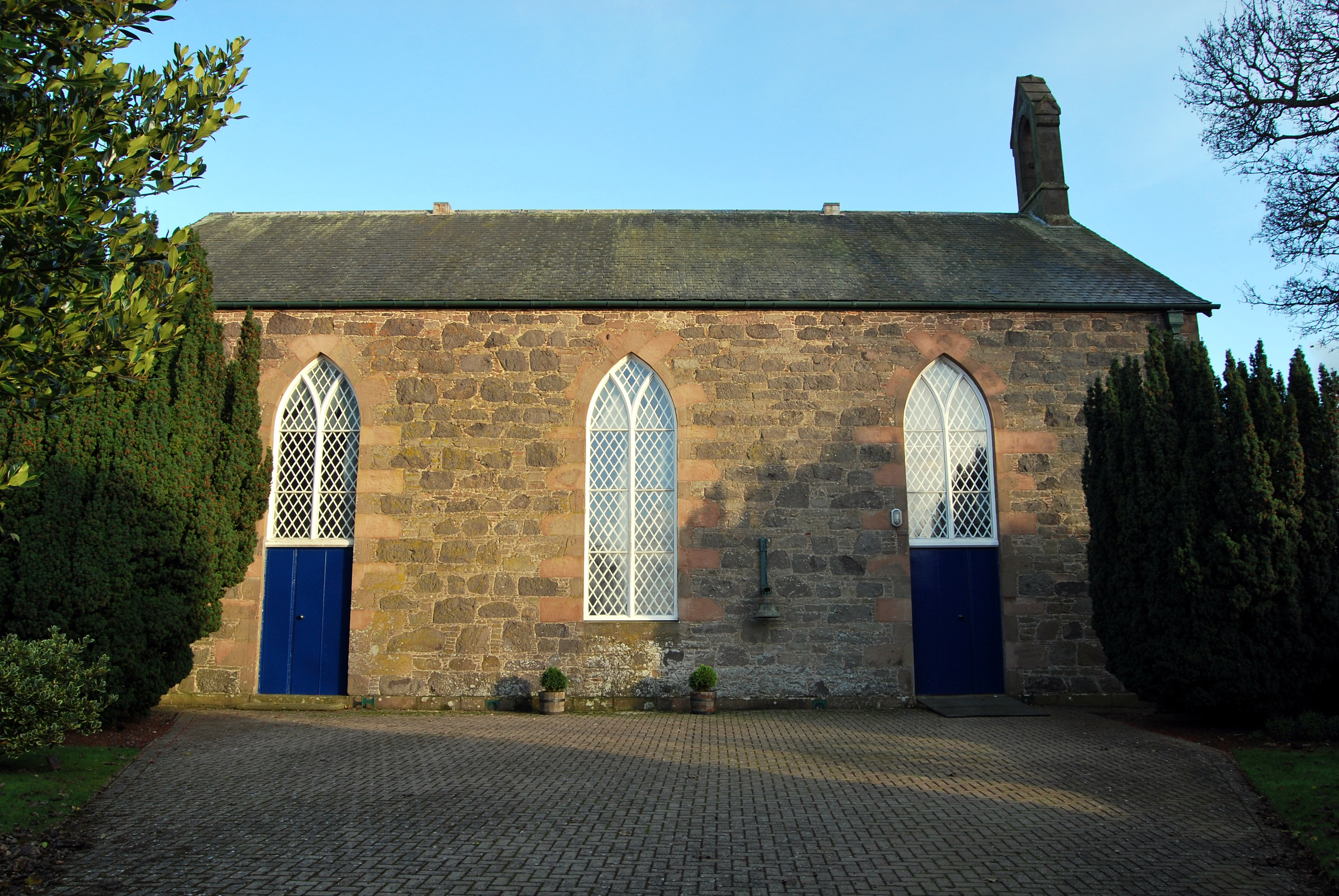
Marykirk Church

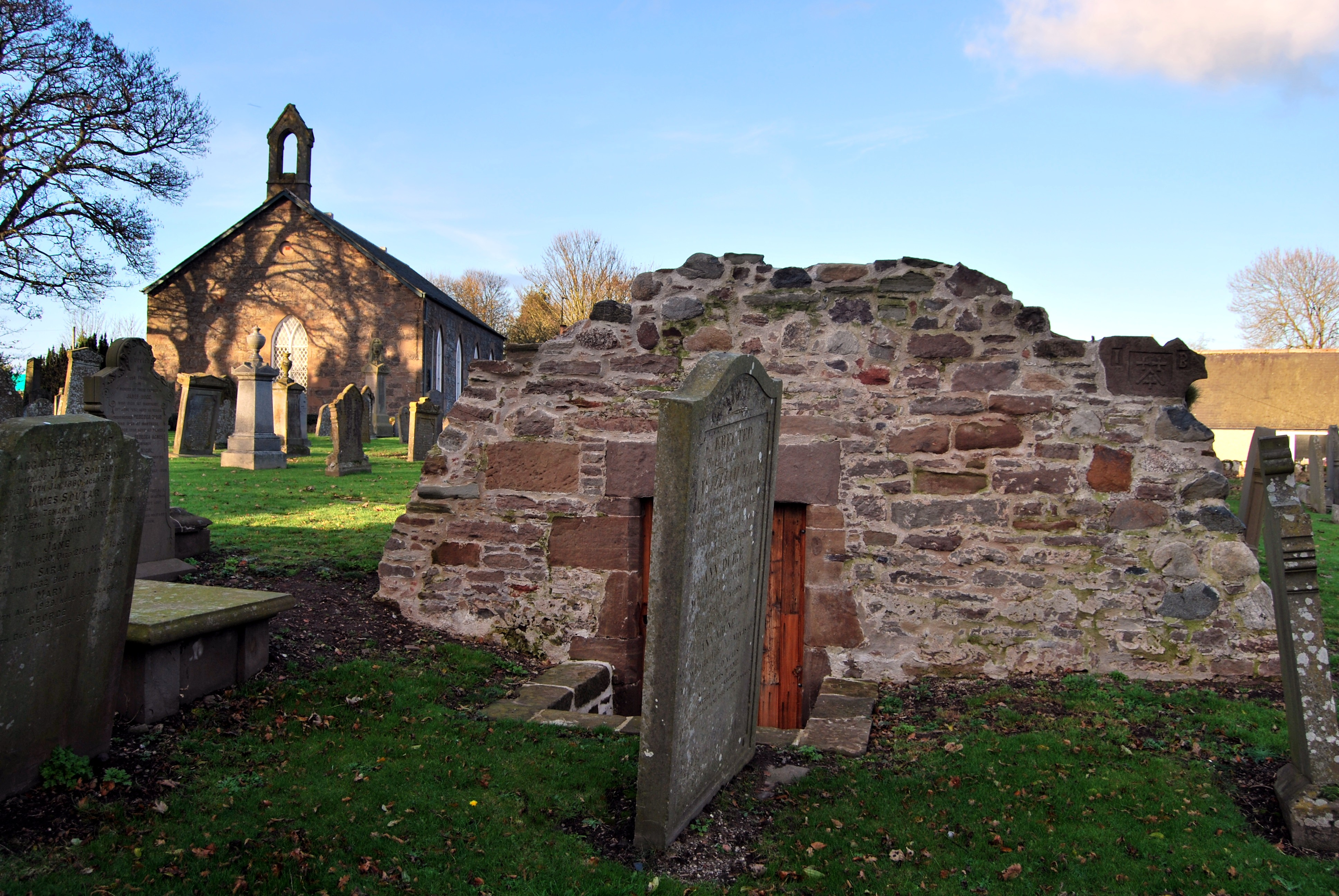
Marykirk ancient kirk and kirkyard

Marykirk (Scottish Gaelic: Obar Luathnait) is a village in the Kincardine and Mearns area of Aberdeenshire, Scotland, next to the border with Angus at the River North Esk.

The village is approximately 6 miles ENE of Montrose at the southern end of the Howe of the Mearns. The road bridge carrying the A937 over the River North Esk is a substantial structure with four arches. It was designed by Robert Stevenson and completed in 1815 at the cost of £1,000 replacing the previous route to the village, an ancient ford. There is a rail bridge across the same river some 600 m north of the road bridge and the village once had a rail station to the north east.

The present parish church was rebuilt in 1806 replacing the previous church, the remains of which can be found in the adjacent kirkyard. The older church was dedicated to St Mary and consecrated in 1242 by the Bishop de Bernham. The settlement and parish were called Aberluthnot before being renamed after the church. The village was made a burgh of barony in 1540 in favour of David Barclay of Mathers by Cardinal David Beaton in 1540, confirmed in 1543 by Queen Mary. The centre of the village has an ancient market cross. The grand gates to the now demolished mansion Kirktonhill House, built in 1799 for the Taylor family, once the home of oil merchant R W Adamson, can be found still in position. Once boasting many small businesses supporting the surrounding agricultural lands, including a part time post office and newsagents the village now has no shops and only the hotel. The nearest shop is a short drive to Montrose or Laurencekirk in the other direction.

The village also has a small primary school of three teachers with between 30 and 40 pupils. as well as a hotel, the 19th-century coaching house, the Marykirk Hotel.

A rare example of a morthouse is located in the churchyard, built to frustrate the activities of bodysnatchers in the 19th century.

From 1996-2002, and then 2009-2019 the village has held an annual raft race in the River North Esk. It could not restart after some preventative work was done on the railway bridge, making it too dangerous for the raft race to proceed.

Marykirk was also the site of the world's first electricity-generating wind turbine, built by James Blyth in 1887 to light his summer residence in the village.

Up until the end of July 2010, the village also had its own amateur weather station.

== Notable people ==
- James Blyth (1839-1906), electrical engineer
- Wally Kinnear (1880-1974), rower

== Sources ==
- Marykirk in the Gazetteer for Scotland
- Marykirk in The History of the Howe
