= Forfar and Brechin Railway =

Defunct railway in Scotland

The Forfar and Brechin Railway was promoted as a possible alternative main line to part of the Caledonian Railway route between Perth and Aberdeen. It was opened in 1895, having been sold while incomplete to the Caledonian Railway.

The hopes to become a main line were never realised and it remained a purely local concern. Its low traffic volumes led to early closure to passengers in 1952 and completely in 1967.

== History ==
=== Early railways ===
The earliest railways in Angus were technologically primitive lines constructed in the 1830s: the Dundee and Newtyle Railway (opened 1831), the Dundee and Arbroath Railway (1838) and the Arbroath and Forfar Railway (1838). They used stone block sleepers and their track gauge was selected with obvious disregard of connecting to other lines further afield. Their focus was connecting harbours on the Firth of Tay with the agricultural hinterland.

=== A Scottish network ===
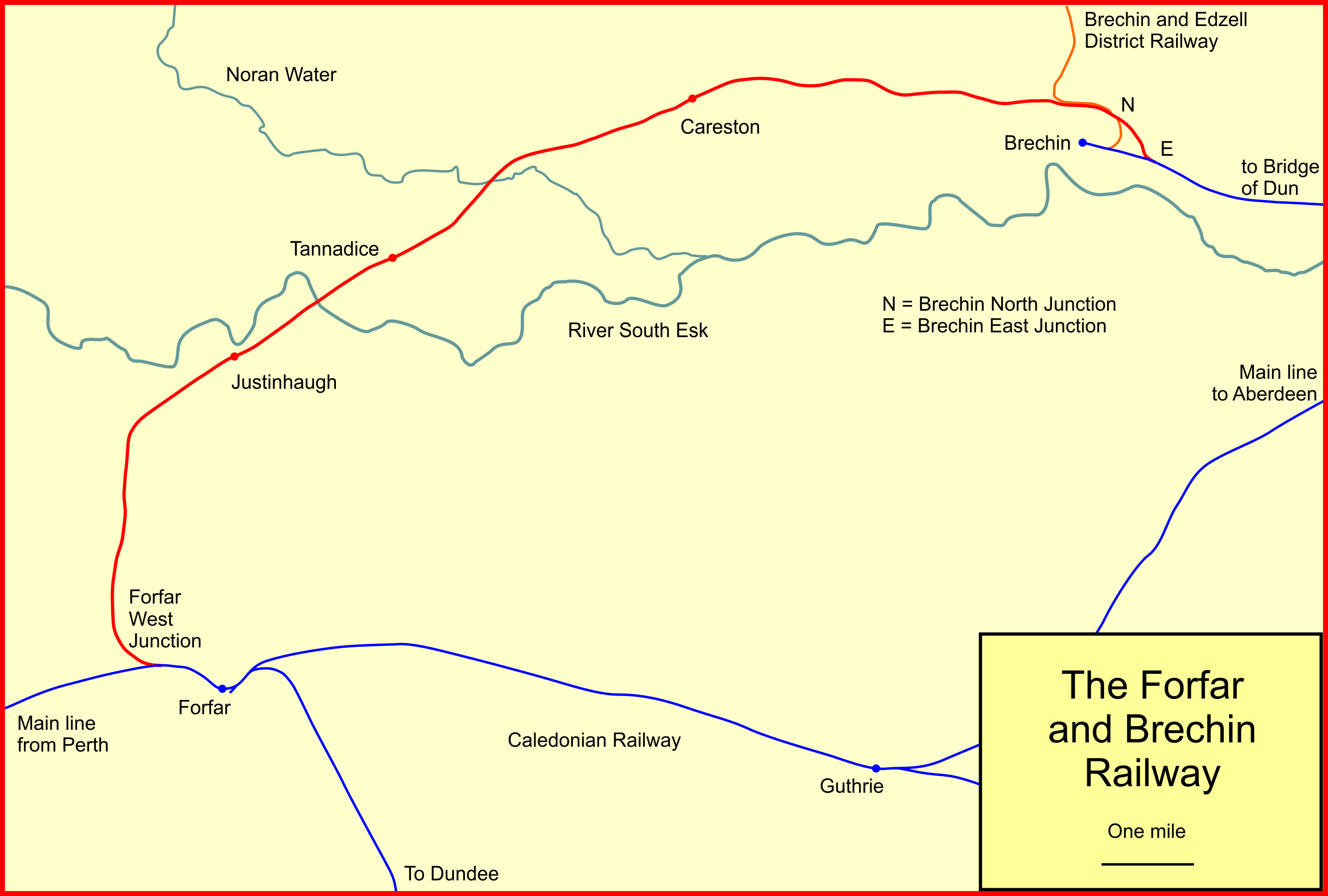
System map of the Forfar and Brechin Railway

In the 1840s serious consideration was given to the connection of central Scotland to London, and considerable public controversy took place over the optimal route, as it was assumed at first that only one line could be supported. The public debate encouraged consideration of a Scottish railway network, and the availability of easy money led to a considerable number of schemes being presented to Parliament for the 1845 session.

Prime among these was the Caledonian Railway, with capital of £1.5 million, to build from Edinburgh and Glasgow to Carlisle. Several other Scottish lines were authorised on the same day, 31 July 1845, including the Scottish Central Railway, to build from Castlecary to Perth, the Scottish Midland Junction Railway, to build from Perth to Forfar, and the Scottish Midland Junction Railway, to build from Perth to Forfar. The last link in this particular chain was the Aberdeen Railway.

=== The Aberdeen Railway ===
The Aberdeen Railway was to build northward from a location between Arbroath and Forfar, to Aberdeen. It was to take over, and modernise, the primitive Arbroath and Forfar line. The A&FR line lay across the general line of advance, and the Aberdeen Railway had two choices: to build from Forfar via Brechin, or to build from the A&FR line somewhere closer to Arbroath.

Brechin was a significant township at the time, with a population in 1841 of about 4,000. However the decision was taken to make a junction with the A&FR near Guthrie instead; this prevented the selection of a route through Brechin, but avoided a considerable mileage of new construction. The Aberdeen Railway opened in stages between 1847 and 1850. Brechin was served by a branch line from Bridge of Dun.

=== The Forfar and Brechin Railway proposed ===
The route via Brechin considered for the Aberdeen Railway was revived in the 1880s, when a main line railway was under consideration from Forfar to Brechin: the earlier proposal was renewed. The Forfar and Brechin Railway was proposed as an alternative main line route, avoiding the detour via Guthrie, somewhat shortening the mileage between Perth and Aberdeen.

There were some practical difficulties with this scheme: the Hills of Finhaven formed a long ridge north of Forfar, which meant that the direct line to Brechin would have to diverge some considerable distance west of the existing Forfar station, and through trains would be unable to make a call: Forfar would be on a branch. Moreover, the terminal station at Brechin faced the centre of the town and could not be converted to a through station. Attempts were made to find an acceptable alternative site for stations at both the towns which would enable the operation of a through main line, but in both cases this proved impossible. The Caledonian was being urged by the F&BR to adopt its scheme as the main line, saving eight miles (13 km) in the main line, but the gradients would be 1 in 80 and both Forfar and Brechin would be off the new main line: the Caledonian were unenthusiastic.

Forfar and Brechin Railway Act 1890
- Act of Parliament
- Parliament of the United Kingdom
- Long title: An Act to incorporate the Forfar and Brechin Railway Company and to empower them to construct Railways in the County of Forfar and for other purposes.
- Citation: 53 & 54 Vict. c. clxvi

Dates
- Royal assent: 4 August 1890

Text of statute as originally enacted

Undeterred, promoters submitted a bill to the 1890 parliamentary session, and the Forfar and Brechin Railway was authorised on 4 August 1890, capital £160,000. (Note: From Carter; Ross says £330,000, page 144, but this is double the price they paid to purchase it in 1893.) The main line was to be 13 miles (21 km) long, with two short connections in Forfar, which were to form the spur connections to the Forfar station. (The railway as built only ran from Forfar station in a westerly direction, curving north and east to the originally planned main line.)

Although still conceived as a through trunk railway, it started from Forfar heading west (involving a reversal there for through trains). There was worse: at Brechin, the proposed alignment passed by the Brechin station, and had no station facility in this, the most important community on its route. It was to converge with the existing Aberdeen Railway line somewhat to the east of its Brechin station.

=== Complications ===
The construction of the Forfar and Brechin line proceeded, and it was complete by early 1894, and by the middle of the year had been successfully inspected by the Board of Trade inspecting officer. However, there were now complications with the neighbouring Brechin and Edzell District Railway. The Edzell line had obtained authorisation concurrently with the Forfar line, but the alignment of the two lines approaching Brechin had not been co-ordinated; moreover there were still moves to provide a suitable station at Brechin for the Edzell line, and this had the effect of delaying the completion of the Forfar line.

The Brechin and Edzell company had to get an Act of Parliament altering their proposed route to make it compatible with the F&BR line: the result was the Brechin and Edzell Railway Amendment Act 1893, which also permitted them to use the Caledonian Railway (as successor to the Aberdeen Railway) station in Brechin, instead of the independent terminus they had originally intended, and the Act also permitted the F&BR line to use that station.

=== Sale to the Caledonian Railway ===
The F&BR had considered itself to be a main line trunk railway but in fact it was becoming a purely local rural line, with no large population centre on its line of route. Raising money for the construction must have been a problem, for on 29 Nov 1893, Joseph Phillips, the contractor for the construction of the line, on behalf of himself and the company sold the line to the Caledonian Railway for £168,400. The fact that Phillips was in the lead means that he was the majority shareholder, so the company must have paid him for his work in shares. The sale was authorised by an Act of 31 July 1894.

=== Opening ===
All the formalities having finally been completed, the line opened to goods trains on 7 January 1895 and to passenger trains on 1 June 1895. The line was worked by the Caledonian from the outset.

The train service was purely local, running to the Brechin terminus station, and the through line, passing Brechin was never used for passenger trains. Indeed, the junction at the east end of the loop connection was controlled from a ground frame only.

The passenger service consisted of four or five trains daily.

=== Decline and closure ===
The F&BR never achieved the main line status that its promoters had imagined: its departure from Forfar meant a reversal there, and a station call at Brechin also meant a reversal. Never reaching its potential the line closed to passenger trains on 4 August 1952.

Goods trains continued to run throughout until on 17 March 1958 the line was closed completely between Careston and Brechin; it was further cut back to only Forfar to Justinhaugh from 7 September 1964, and completely closed on 4 September 1967.

== Topography ==
At Brechin the line as authorised passed west to east on the north side of the town. After the 1893 Act modifying the Edzell line, the two lines joined on the north west side of the town and ran for a while alongside one another, as two single lines, to Brechin North Junction; from there the two lines combined and ran as a double line round to Brechin terminal station. The F&BR line continued eastwards to Brechin East Junction; this was a ground frame controlled connection only.

Passenger operation on the Forfar and Brechin line was from 1 June 1895 to 4 August 1952.

Stations and Locations:

- Forfar West Junction; from Caledonian main line;
- Justinhaugh;
- Tannadice;
- Careston;
- Brechin North Junction; Edzell line trails in; Edzell line to Brechin station diverges;
- Brechin East Junction; converges with Caledonian Railway branch line.
