= Clan Guthrie =

Scottish clan

- Gutraidh ("Windy place.")
- Crest: A dexter arm holding a drawn sword Proper.
- Motto: "Sto pro veritate." ("I stand for the truth.")

Profile
- District: Angus

Chief
- Christian Guthrie of Guthrie,
- 23rd Chief of Clan Guthrie
- Seat: Via Margutta 51A, 00187 Rome (Italy).
- Historic seat: Guthrie Castle.
Clan branches
Guthrie of Guthrie (chiefs)
Guthrie of Halkerton
Rival clans
Clan Gardyne

Clan Guthrie is a Scottish clan.

== History ==
=== Origins of the clan ===
The family of Guthrie took their name from the lands of the same name in the county of Angus and their name is one of the oldest in that county. The origin of the name Guthrie is not known, although there is a tradition that the lands were named Guthrie by an early king of Scots, after a fisherman gut three fish to serve his hungry monarch.

In about 1178 William the Lion granted the lands of Gutherin to Arbroath Abbey. The family were royal falconers and subsequently purchased these lands.

=== Wars of Scottish Independence ===
The Laird of Guthrie was sent to France in 1299 to invite William Wallace to return to Scotland. The mission was successful and Guthrie landed with Wallace at Montrose, Angus. The early charters of the Guthrie family have since been lost but it seems certain that they obtained the Barony of Guthrie from David II of Scotland.

=== 15th century ===
In August 1442, Alexander Guthrie of Guthrie witnessed a charter by Alexander Seton, lord of Gordon to Lord Keith. He acquired the lands of Kincaldrum near Forfar in 1446 and became Baillie of Forfar. Sir David Guthrie of Guthrie was armour bearer to the king, captain of the guard and was appointed Lord Treasurer of Scotland in 1461. He also obtained a charter under the great seal to build Guthrie Castle in 1468 and in 1473 was appointed Lord Chief Justice of Scotland. David greatly increased the Guthrie estates and founded a collegiate church at Guthrie which was confirmed in a Papal bull of 1479.

=== 16th century and clan conflicts ===
David's son, Sir Alexander Guthrie, was killed at the Battle of Flodden in 1513. In 1567 the Guthries signed a bond upholding the authority of the infant James VI of Scotland against that of his mother, Mary, Queen of Scots. Around the same time the Clan Guthrie were feuding with their neighbours, the Clan Gardyne. Alexander Guthrie had been assassinated at Inverpeffer and the Guthries retaliated. The feud lasted until 1618, when the Guthries were saved from their actions by a royal pardon.

=== 17th century and civil war ===
In the early seventeenth century the estate passed through cousins until 1636 when John Guthrie, Bishop of Moray became the eleventh chief of Clan Guthrie. Guthrie had been ordained at Perth and had become minister of St Giles in Edinburgh in 1621. He took up residence at Spynie Palace in 1623 and was consecrated Bishop of Moray. During the Scottish Civil War he was forced to surrender his castle to the forces of Colonel Monroe, retiring to his own estates in Guthrie. His third son, Andrew, fought for James Graham, 1st Marquis of Montrose but was captured at the Battle of Philiphaugh. Andrew was sentenced to death and beheaded by the Scottish "Maiden" in January 1646 in St Andrews. Andrew's daughter, Bethia, married a kinsman, Francis Guthrie of Gagie, and as a result the title and estates remained with the Guthrie family.

Henry Guthrie, Bishop of Dunkeld, was a cousin of John Guthrie, the Bishop of Moray.

The Guthries were religious leaders in the time of Martin Luther and were champions of Presbyterianism against the Roman Catholic Church. They were ready to back up their beliefs with their lives and were true to their reputation of 'holding a sword in one hand, a Bible in the other'.

James Guthrie, who was of the chiefly family, was a Covenanter minister who became one of that movement's early martyrs. He was ordained the minister of Lauder in 1638 and moved to Stirling in 1649. He preached openly against the king's religious policies and was stripped of his office by the Church of Scotland's General Assembly, whose authority Guthrie had challenged. He continued to preach until 1661 when he was sentenced to death and executed.

=== 18th and 19th centuries ===
A branch of the Clan Guthrie were the Guthries of Halkerton who held their barony by right of the office of royal falconers in Angus. However this title and office were only relinquished under the terms of the Heritable Jurisdictions Act in 1747.

John Douglas Guthrie of Guthrie served in the cavalry during the 1882 Egyptian campaign. He married Mary, daughter of Duncan Davidson of Tulloch.

Lieutenant Colonel Ivan Guthrie of Guthrie was the last chief of Clan Guthrie to live at Guthrie Castle. He was born in 1886, he became a distinguished soldier, commanding the 4th Battalion the Black Watch and was awarded the Military Cross.

== The clan today ==
Guthrie Castle was purchased by the [de la] Peña family in 1984. There is an active fraternal organization, Clan Guthrie USA, dedicated to preserving and promoting Guthrie heritage.

== Clan Chief ==
The previous chief was Alexander Ivan Bedini Guthrie of Guthrie 22nd of that Ilk, who inherited the title from his grandmother Moira Guthrie of Guthrie in 1990. Born in London in 1967, he was educated in Italy and England and attended UCL; he lived between Rome, Monte Argentario and the UK. Guthrie of Guthrie died in London of COVID-19 on 23 March 2020. He was succeeded by Christian Guthrie of Guthrie, 23rd of that Ilk, as the 23rd Chief of Clan Guthrie.

== Tartans ==
| Tartan image | Notes |
|---|---|
| | Ancient (AKA Dress) Tartan. A dark blue and green plaid with red/orange stripes. |
| | Battle (AKA Weathered) Tartan. The same pattern, but primarily brown and bluish gray with red striping. |
| | Modern Tartan Follows the same pattern, but is primarily dark navy & dark green with red stripes. |

== Clan Castles ==
- Guthrie Castle: Is a historic site, and is well known in Scotland. Located near Forfar in Angus, the castle was built in 1468 under a warrant granted by King James III of Scotland to his treasurer, Sir David Guthrie. It originally consisted of only the square tower, and a yett (entrance gate). The yett was a symbol of trust in an era when the King wasn't anxious for his subjects to be heavily fortified. The tower has walls 14 feet thick, which discouraged invaders until the invention of modern artillery. It is believed that the family stopped living in the tower, and built a house close by around 1760. In 1848, John Guthrie, with the help of architect David Bryce, connected the tower and the house. Major renovations were carried out by John and Harriet Maude Guthrie in the 1850s. Later, the railroad which ran from Forfar to Guthrie actually had tracks passing along the top of the main gate. Guthrie Castle was sold in 1984 to the Penna family. After 19 years as their private residence, the family opened the castle to the public (by prior reservation). Today, it's a popular venue for weddings and special events, including golf on the property course. The castle has a reputation of being haunted. The ghost was last seen by one of the present members of the Guthrie family when she was a little girl. There have been other experiences since the Peña family first inhabited it in September 1984.
- Gagie House: Near Dundee, was built in 1614. It served as the dower house for the Laird-to-be of Guthrie Castle. The eldest son of the Laird was often given Gagie on his marriage, and he lived here until his father died. He then moved with his family into Guthrie Castle, and his eldest son took up residence in Gagie House. Gagie has been altered in each century, but still maintains its 17th-century charm. The garden wall was originally a defensive bamkin wall, and is attached to the house. In the garden is the summer house, built by John and Jean Guthrie in 1762. Gagie contains a number of family portraits that formerly graced the walls of Guthrie Castle. They were purchased by the Friends of the Guthrie Castle when they were auctioned upon the sale of the castle. Gagie is now owned by the Smoors, and they welcomed visiting Guthries. According to Clan Guthrie USA's May 2013 newsletter, Gagie house is now for sale.
- Torosay Castle: Located on the Isle of Mull, Torosay Castle was acquired in 1865 by Arburthnot Charles Guthrie, a wealthy London businessman. It served as his getaway. The castle has over 60 rooms, and is surrounded by an estate of over 12,000 acres. Torosay was sold in 2012 to the McLean Fund and closed to the public for a year. Opening with a private family dinner in December 2013. Christopher Guthrie-James, former Laird of the Estate said "it was with a sense of relief, rather than regret, that we sold the family home at Torosay." Kenneth Donald McLean sixth Laird has spent more than £1 million restoring the castle and gardens.

== Branches of Clan Guthrie ==
Although the Guthries of Guthrie were the main line of the family, many offshoots existed, some of them mentioned in an old rhyme: "Guthrie o' Guthrie and Guthrie o' Gagie Guthrie o' Taybank an' Guthrie o' Craigie."

=== Clan Guthrie USA ===
Clan Guthrie USA is a nonprofit, fraternal organization of over 400 Guthrie families who have joined to promote and preserve their common heritage. The organization participates in Scottish Highland festivals, sells Guthrie merchandise, publishes a quarterly newsletter, sponsors special events (such as Scotland reunion tours), and maintains a Guthrie genealogy database.

== See also ==
- Scottish clan
- Guthrie baronets
