= Friockheim railway station =

Disused railway station in Friockheim, Angus

Friockheim
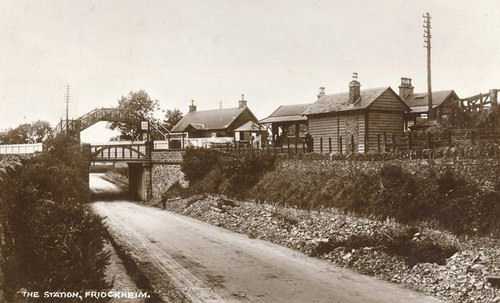
- A postcard of the station, circa 1908

General information
- Location: Friockheim, Angus; Scotland
- Coordinates: 56.6355°N 2.6755°W
- Grid reference: NO586494
- Platforms: 2

Other information
- Status: Disused

History
- Original company: Aberdeen Railway
- Pre-grouping: Aberdeen Railway; Caledonian Railway
- Post-grouping: London, Midland and Scottish Railway

Key dates
- 4 December 1838: Opened as Friockheim Junction
- 1849: Name changed to Friockheim
- 5 December 1955: Closed
Location

Friockheim railway station served the village of Friockheim, Angus, Scotland from 1838 to 1955 on the Arbroath and Forfar Railway.

== History ==
The station opened as Friockheim Junction on 4 December 1838 by the Aberdeen Railway. The goods yard was to the south. The station's name was changed to Friockheim in 1849. It closed to both passengers and goods traffic on 5 December 1955.

Preceding station	Historical railways	Following station
Glasterlaw; Line open, station closed	Aberdeen Railway	Guthrie; Line open, station closed
	Disused railways	
Leysmill; Line and station closed	Arbroath and Forfar Railway	Guthrie; Line and station closed
