= Baron of Craigie =

Title of nobility in the Baronage of Scotland

The coat of arms of the Baron of Craigie
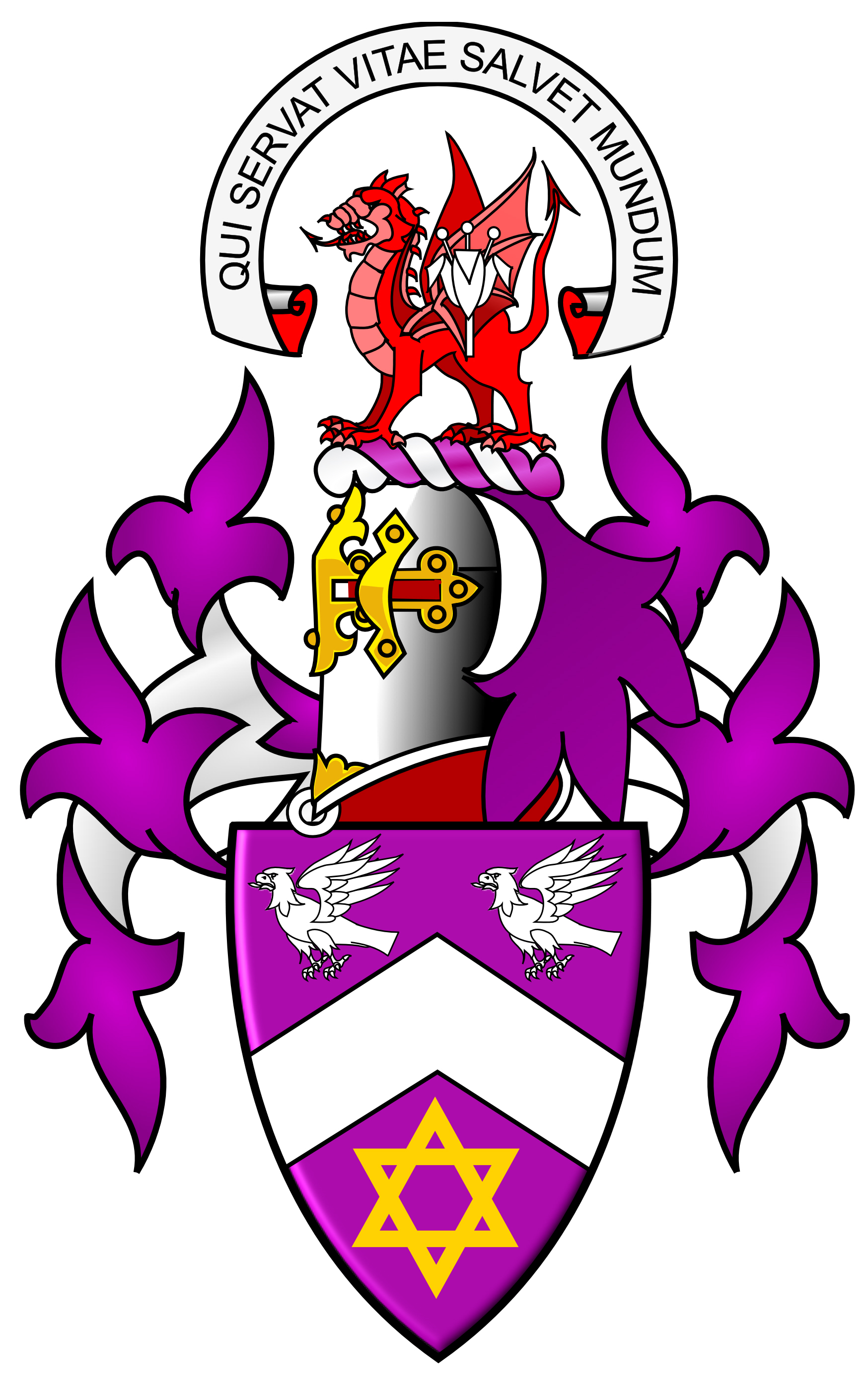
- Crest: a dragon passant Gules charged of a lily Argent
- Shield: Purpure, a chevron between in chief two falcons Volant Argent and in a base a Star of David Or
- Motto: Qui servat vitae salvet mundum, Latin for "He who saves a life saves the world"

Baron of Cragie is a title of nobility in the Baronage of Scotland.

The barony was established by crown charter, within and near Dundee. Craigie has long been incorporated within the boundaries of the Royal Burgh of Dundee; before that it was a barony lying on the periphery of the town. The Barony of Craigie is governed under the Abolition of Feudal Tenure Act, Scotland, 2000 which protects the dignity of the title.

Baronies date from the medieval period and were administrative units established by the Scottish king, where the local barons ruled on behalf of the king through a baron court. Their powers were substantial within the barony which included forcing people to fight as soldiers. This was their downfall as some barons took their tenants into rebellions such as the Jacobites in 1745, resulting in Barons' powers being stripped in 1747.

The current noble baron is The Much Honoured Rabbi Robert Owen Thomas III, 1st Baron of Craigie.

== Location ==
Locations:

– Craigie, Dundee, Scotland

=== Lands ===
The lands and farms of Craigie were designated as "Craigie" before AD 1534, although it was labelled as "Kragy" in some maps, such as the "Lower Angus and Perthshire east of the Tay map", by Timothy Pont, circa 1583–1596. Kragy and Craigie may refer to a rocky landscape. Craigie is located near a hill of sorts in some maps, such as "Anguss [sic] / R.G.", by Robert Gordon [1580–1661], circa 1636–1652.

The old lands of the Barony of Craigie lie to the east of central Dundee, Scotland, in the vicinity of A929 Forfar Road to the west, and A972 Kinsgway East to the north. The A930, Broughty Ferry Road and Dundee Road West, begins in what was the land of Craigie. Other lands, particularly from the Barony of Barry and Woodhill, were drawn into the Barony of Craigie.

While much of Craigie is now developed and within Dundee, some portions of the lands of Craigie remain much as they were at the formation of the barony. In 1881 the lands of Craigie were described in idyllic terms, such as "Craigie, [ family of] Kid, excellent land, a good house, with a new little park;"

The lands of Craigie, including Craigie House and the farms of Craigie, can be found on maps found on the ScotlandPlaces web site. An entry from the National Library of Scotland, "Northern Part of Angus Shire. Southern Part.", by Edinburgh : J. Thomson & Co., in 1825 provides an excellent view of the lands of Craigie. Craigie is located just to the east (right) of Dundee, just north of the coastline, and west (left) of the Broughty Castle. Other historical references to Craigie include citations in 1678 as found in the Angusia Provincia Scotiae sive The Shire of Angus, by Janssonius Waesberghe, Moses Pitt and Stephanus Swart of Amsterdam.

The lands of the Barony of Craigie were never fully set, with frequent changes of territory between abbeys, merchants, towns, and nobles. Warden states that the "...property of Craigie was a large and valuable estate five or six centuries ago [ before 1884 ], but it was at an early period cut up into several sections, and these were again sub-divided into smaller portions, which makes it impossible to give a correct continuous account of either the sections or the smaller portions into which they were divided..."

=== Seat ===
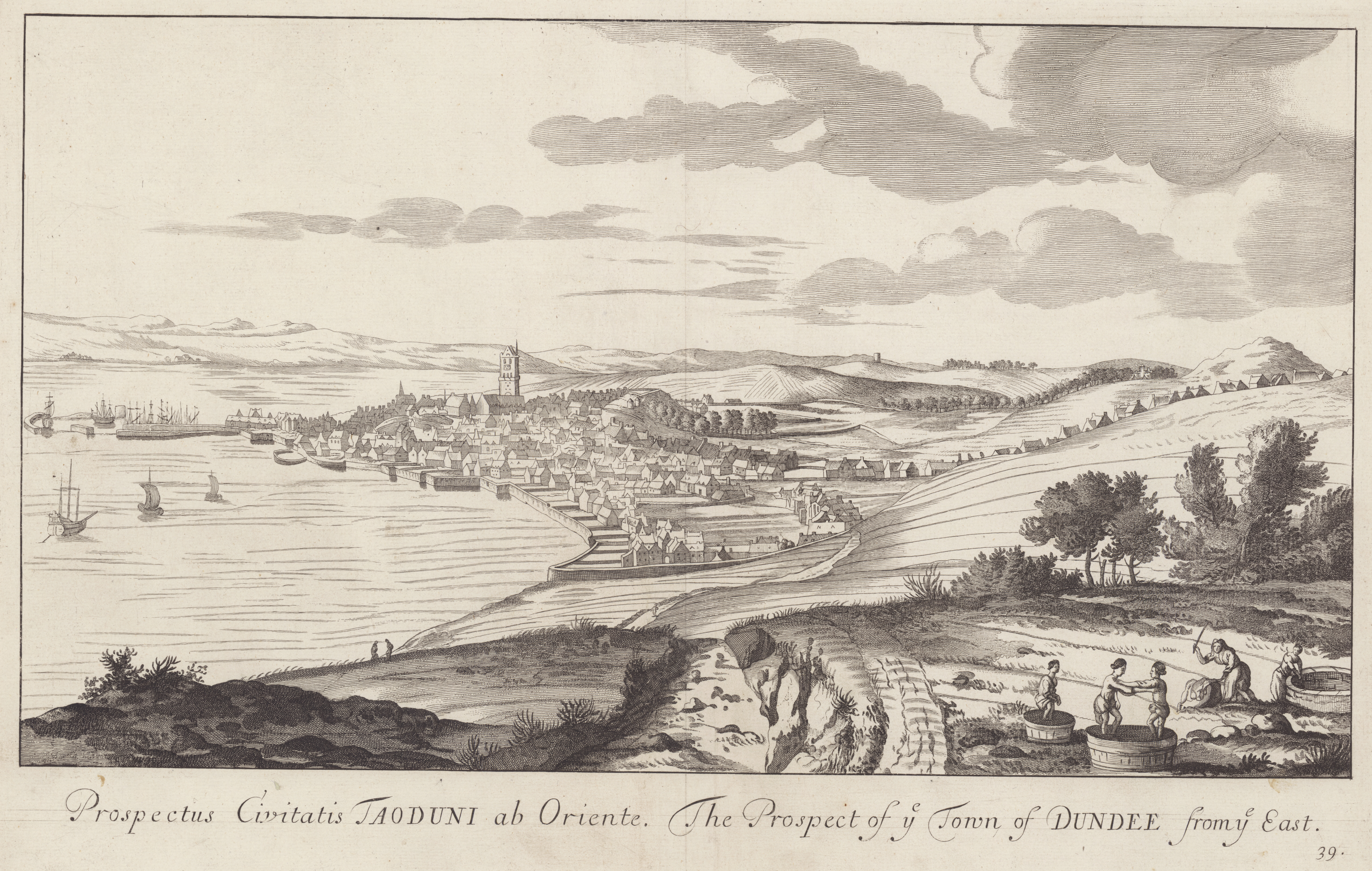
Dundee as seen looking west from the Barony of Craigie

The seat, also known as the caput or messuage, of the Barony of Craigie was Craigie House near Dundee. Craigie House has also been called Wallace Craigie House and The House of Craigie. The home was built by the 1st Baron of Craigie James Guthrie or his son. The manor home was located at the end of the current Southampton Road leading off Craigie Drive in Dundee, Scotland.

However, Wallace Craigie House and Craigie House should not be confused, the former being situated some distance from the latter, at the west end of Blackscroft, Dundee, until c1820, when it was probably demolished to facilitate industrial development in the area. Around the time the Guthries acquired Craigie, the neighbouring Wallace Craigie was purchased by George Constable. The principal residence of the Craigie estate prior to the construction of Craigie House, may have been Old Craigie, which survived as a farmhouse until the mid 20th century.

In the latter half of the 18th century Craigie House was one of the better-known country houses in Forfarshire. In the Statistical Account of 1793 the agricultural focus on the manor was noted: "The market in Dundee, for all kinds of butcher meat, is one of the best in Scotland. No sheep are bred, or even fattened for sale, except a few by Mr. Guthrie of Craigie."

In 1831 the Guthrie family, having interests elsewhere, put the demesne up for sale. At the time the demesne included Craigie House and 232 acres. The demesne was not sold in 1831, however, and remained in the Guthrie family.

In 1856 Craigie House was described as a "...neat villa, beautifully situated amid finely wooded grounds and gardens, on the sea-coast, on the north side of the Broughty Ferry Road, about two miles east of Dundee." Broughty Ferry Road exists today and can be viewed on Google Maps.

Alexander Johnston Warden, in his 1884 work Angus or Forfarshire, the Land and its People, Descriptive and Historical, quotes Reverend James Headrick from his 1813 work Review of the Agriculture of Angus, who says of Craigie House "The plantations are so artificially disposed as to hide all those parts of the Tay where the tide leaves the bottom dry, and to give it all the effect of an artificial lake. The constant play of the boats and shipping, seen through these openings, gives them all the effect of figures in the magic lantern." Warden goes on to comment that the view from Craigie House is "extremely beautiful," with Craigie House surrounded by thriving plantations, clumps of trees, and much well-grown timber. The house is described by Warden as a good, comfortable dwelling despite not being in the modern style.

Other references list Wallace Craigie house as an ancient house, set within a walled land on the banks of the Tay. A drawing, perhaps by John Slezer in or about 1678, shows a home that was likely constructed, at least in part, before 1733. In the mid 18th century whaling companies had occupied the lands that had once been the waterside gardens of Wallace Craigie House. Wallace Craigie House was described as being quite similar to Invergowrie House, a manse on the grounds of Ninewells Hospital in Dundee.

As a result of business interests elsewhere, the Guthrie family sold Craigie House, an acre and a half of ground, and the Stables of Craigie House, in 1911. The Stables of Craigie House were converted into a dwelling place in 1910, and sold independently as Stirling House in 1920.

Craigie House was a private nursing home from 1923 until 1949, first run by Miss Clementina Methven and then by Mrs. Christine Brodie and her family. In 1948 it was sold to Jute Industries Ltd. who used it as a hostel for workers. In 1949 it was sold to Dundee Corporation as a retirement home. In 1974 it was transferred to the Tayside Region, and in 1996 it reverted to the Dundee City Council. The home became unsuitable as a residence because of increasing standards of care and was demolished in 1983. A home for the elderly now stands on the site of Craigie House.

The acreage of the demesne was sold off to various concerns over the years, with the last 60 acres of the demesne sold to Strathern Estates Ltd. in 1955 for use by Craigie High School, Craigiebarns Primary, and other uses.

Today the demesne of the Barony of Craigie is a developed, suburban, largely residential area of Dundee.

Woodhill House in Barry, Angus may have formed part of the Barony of Craigie as well.

== History and formation of the lands and Barony ==
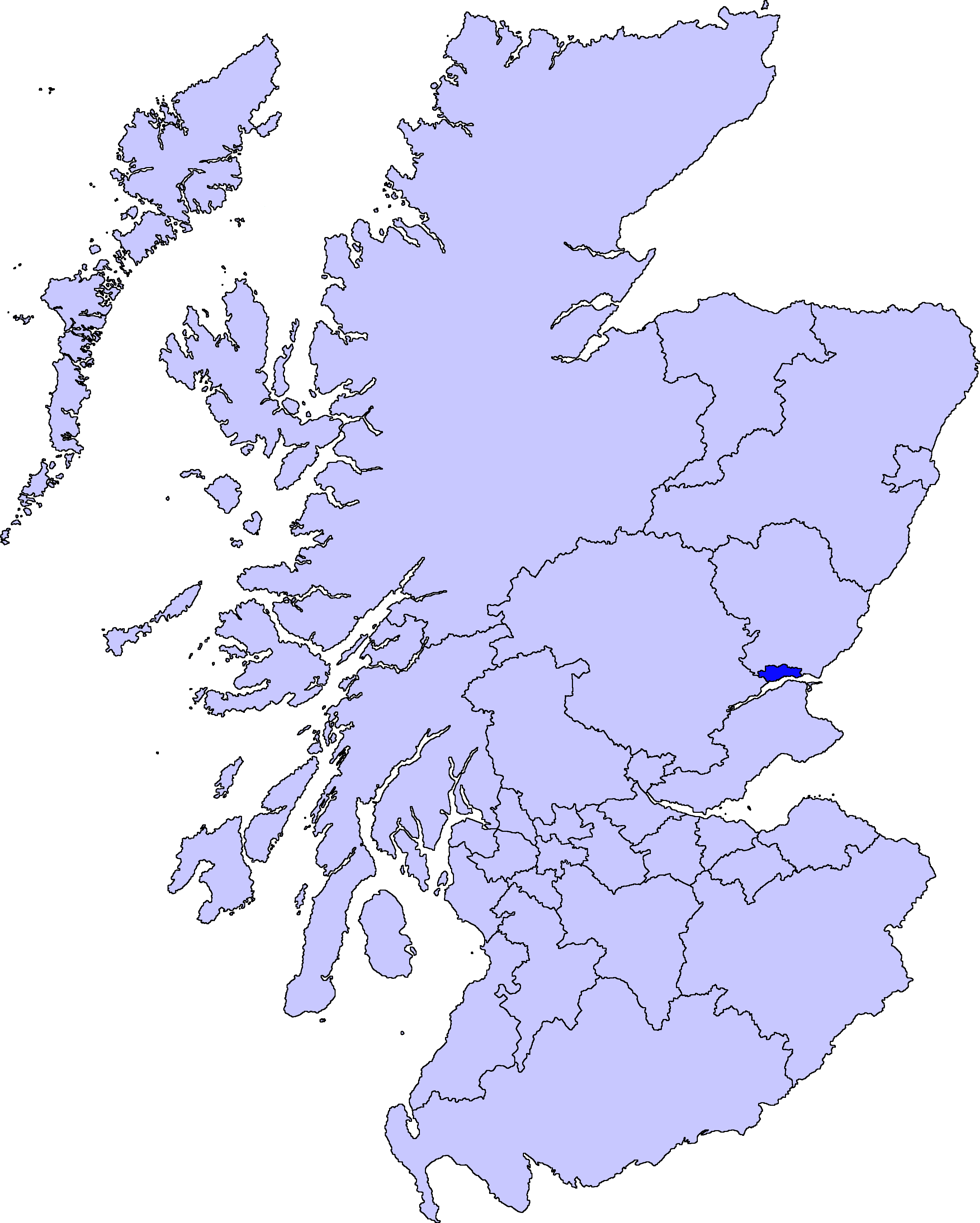
Much of the Barony of Craigie lies within Dundee in Scotland.

=== Craigie prior to the Barony ===
The lands of Craigie were in the hands of several prominent families in the vicinity of Dundee, most of whom leased out these lands to tenant farmers during the medieval period. It was not until the mid seventeenth century that the lands of Craigie together with lands in the parish of Barry, Angus, were formed into a distinct barony.

David of Scotland, Earl of Huntingdon, owned the lands of Craigie near Dundee in the late 12th century. About 1200 the lands of Hilton and Milton of Craigie were donated by his second daughter, possibly known as Ysabella de Brous, to the Abbey of Lindores in north Fife. These lands remained under the abbey until at least 1480. King David II of Scotland confirmed this grant in a charter at Dundee on 20 September 1365. The affirmation states that the original charter was granted by King Alexander II of Scotland at Maiden's Castle on 12 November 1247.

In 1309 King Robert the Bruce of Scotland granted parts of the lands of Craigie to Robert Barbor, Andrew Gray, and Allan of Balmossie. Much of the granted lands formerly belonged to John Baliol.

Patrick of Inverpeffer, a burgess of Dundee, was granted part of the lands of Craigie with fishing rights by King Robert II of Scotland in 1378.

In 1365 King David II of Scotland granted a charter to John Gray of all his lands, and of Craigie in Forfarshire. King David II also reaffirmed the grant of lands to the Abbey of Lindores.

Much of the confusion around the lands of Craigie may come from the variety of spellings, notably Craigie and Kragy. In a charter from King David II of Scotland dated 11 February 1366, William Guppyld is confirmed in his land from the inheritance of Alexander of Lambirtoun. The charter, witnessed by Laurence, Archdeacon of Brechin, Margarita Countess of Angus, Sir Walter of Leslie, and Sir Alexander de Lindsay, confirms William Guppyld into lands from both Lumlathyn and "Cragoe" (Craigie).

King Robert III of Scotland gave by charter a portion of the lands of Craigie, then in the Barony of Dundee, to St Salvador's Altar in the parish church of Dundee.

On 9 October 1535, David Wedderburn of Tofts, Town Clerk of Dundee, received from King James V of Scotland a charter to the lands of Hilton of Craigie. The charter was granted to Wedderburn and his spouse, Helen Lawson.

In 1600 King James VI of Scotland granted the properties of the Abbey of Lindores to Patrick Leslie, the Commendator of Lindores. This grant included Hilton, Hillend, and Miltoun of Craigie.

On 29 December 1607, Sir William Scharp of Pitkethley was retoured in the sixth part of Hilton of Craigie. On 2 May 1611, John Scharp of Ballindoch, brother of Sir William Scharp, was retoured the same sixth part of Hilton of Craigie. Another heir of Sir William Scharp, John Scharp of Ballindoch, received other parts of the lands of Craigie.

The lands of Craigie passed through the Scharp (or Schairp, or Sharpe) family passed down portions of Craigie, generally around Hilton of Craigie.

=== Elevation to Barony ===
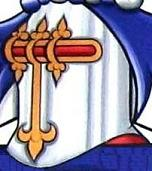
A Scottish Baron's helmet.

On 28 October 1662, Patrick Kyd of Craigie was retoured in the third part of the town and land of Hilton of Craigie, formerly called Wester Craigie, in the barony of Dundee. On 5 April 1677, James Kyd of Woodhill was retoured in the third part of the town and lands of Hilton of Craigie, the sixth part of the same, the teind sheaves of the same, and the half lands of Craigie. This was combined and raised into the Barony of Craigie.

The Kyd family remained in possession of much of the lands of the Barony of Craigie until the mid 18th century. During a meeting dated 8 October 1759, James Guthrie of Craigie is listed as proposing to purchase a portion of the lands near Craigie from the Convener of the Nine Trades. It is possible that James Guthrie of Craigie was by then in possession of the whole of Craigie. On 26 February 1704 a matter regarding the Muir of Craigie was settled between the Town, James Guthrie of Craigie, and James Kyd (note: not listed as "of Craigie"), heir of George Kyd of Craigie. This may be the first indication that the lands of Craigie had passed from the Kyd family to the Guthrie family.

In 1884 David Charles Guthrie is described as the laird of Craigie. His brother, James Stirling Guthrie, is described as his heir.

Later in the 18th or early 19th century Robert McGavin of Balumbie owned approximately one half of the estate of Craigie. He donated 20 acres to Dundee to build a cemetery. The remaining Craigie lands held by McGavin are described as "...good land, the greater part of it having a southern exposure, and it is a desirable property."

The title and lands were formally split by the Abolition of Feudal Tenure Act, Scotland, 2000. By 2011 the title of the Barony of Craigie was governed as part of an estate, and was granted by assignation to the Thomas family.

== Barons of Craigie ==
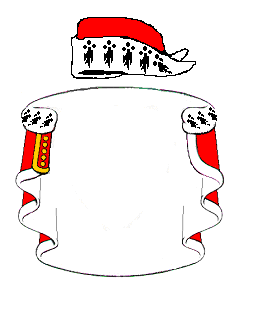
The historical Scottish Baron's Mantle and Chapeau from the 1930s–2004, now no longer granted. Baron Arms has reverted to historical customs.

- Patrick Kyd, 1st Baron of Craigie (1666–1677)
- James Kyd, 2nd Baron of Craigie (1677–1728, d.1735)
- James Guthrie, 1st Baron of Craigie (1728–1788)
- James Guthrie, 2nd Baron of Craigie (1788–1830)
- James Guthrie, 3rd Baron of Craigie (1830–1866)
- George Makgill, 9th Viscount of Oxfuird, 1st Baron of Craigie (1866–1867)
- James Alexander Guthrie, 4th Baron of Craigie (1867–1873)
- David Charles Guthrie, 5th Baron of Craigie (1873–1918)
- James Alexander Guthrie, 6th Baron of Craigie (1918–1932)
- David Charles Guthrie, 7th Baron of Craigie (1932–2003)
- Rabbi Robert Owen Thomas, III, 1st Baron of Craigie (b. 1966)

The heir apparent is the present holder's son, Oliver Leigh Thomas of Craigie, Younger of Craigie.

During the first half of the seventeenth century the lands of Craigie were gradually acquired by the Kidd or Kyd family. This started in 1617 with Patrick Kyd a merchant in Dundee who began to invest in land in the periphery of Dundee. These lands were eventually formed into the barony of Craigie held by the Kyd family who several generations later disposed of it to a branch of the Guthrie family, who in turn disposed of it to the Thomas family.

== Family history ==
=== Kyd family ===
The Kyd or Kid or Kidd family may be a sept of Clan Fergusson. The Kid family held lands in Craigie since before 1534, being described as esquire of Craigie.

"Patrick Kyd, Esq. of Craigie, Angus, married Margaret, daughter of Sir Alexander Wedderburn of Blackness (knighted AD 1642), by his wife Matilda, daughter of Fletcher of Innerpeffer. This family held Craigie, before AD 1534. [Baronage, p. 473]"

The links between the Kid family and Woodhill and Craigie are established in the same entry.

"William Kyd, Esq. of Woodhill, Angus, brother of Patrick of Craigie, wedded Jean Wedderburn, sister of his brother's wife. [Baronage, p.281] Woodhill seems eventually to have succeeded to Craigie – for Mr. Thomas Kyd, Merchant in Edinburgh, "son of Woodhill and Craigie", wedded Rachel, daughter of Dr. William Eccles (died 1723) of Kildonan, by his second wife, Margaret, daughter of Sir John Wedderburn of Blackness – by whom he left children. [Baronage, p. 438.]

Arms, Crest, and Motto, the same as Craigie. [Herald, Vol II.]"

On 4 December 1617 King James VI of Scotland confirmed the sale by Andrew, Lord Gray, with the agreement of his wife Anne, Countess of Buchan, of his third part of the town of Hilton of Craigie alias Wester Craigie to Patrick Kyd a merchant burgess of Dundee. Patrick had been admitted as a burgess of Dundee on 20 October 1591 by right of his father Archibald Kyd a burgess there. On 16 June 1632, King Charles I of Scotland confirmed a charter granted by Patrick Kyd of Grange of Barry on 4 September 1620, whereby he sold a third part of the lands and town of Hilton of Craigie alias Wester Craigie to his son James Kyd and his future wife Agnes, daughter of Robert Clayhills of Baldovie, a merchant burgess of Dundee. James Durham disponed one sixth of the Hiltoun of Craigie, on 5 April 1646, to James Kyd of Grange of Barry. This had originally belonged to the Abbey of Lindores which granted it to David Wedderburn on 9 October 1538, later it was owned by John Sharp who sold it to James Durham. This was confirmed by King Charles I of Scotland on 8 May 1646. On 28 October 1662, Patrick Kyd of Craigie, was served heir to his grandfather Patrick Kyd of Grange of Barry, in the lands of Nether Barry Muir in the barony of Barry. On the same day he was served heir to his father Master James Kyd of Craigie in a third part of the lands and house of Hilton of Craigie alias Wester Craigie, in the barony of Dundee, the teinds thereof, a tenth of the lands of Hilton of Craigie, a sixth part of the lands of Hilton of Craigie, and part of the teinds of the said lands in the barony of Dundee, also the lands of Upper Barry Muir. Patrick Kyd junior of Craigie was admitted as a burgess of Dundee on 7 February 1657 by right of his father.

On 13 May 1663, William Kyd, was served heir to his immediate younger brother James Kyd, son of Mr James Kyd of Craigie, in three tenements in Dundee, half the house and lands of North Ferry at Broughty, and fishing rights on the River Tay. [Retours, Forfar, 402] William Kyd, son of James Kyd of Craigie, was admitted as a burgess of Dundee on 22 September 1660 at the same time as his brothers Robert and Thomas. [DBR]

Finally on 17 July 1666, Charter granting Patrick Kyd of Craigie, and his heirs or assignees the town and lands of Grange of Barry, in the barony of Barry, Angus, the lands of Barry Muir and Lower Barry Muir, in the same barony, the lands of Upper Barry Muir, a third part of the town and lands of Hilton of Craigie alias Wester Craigie which was acquired by Patrick Kyd of Craigie of Grange of Barry from Andrew, Lord Gray, in the barony of Dundee; a sixth part of the same acquired by James Kyd of Craigie from James Durham of Pitkerro; half of the same lying on the sunnyside of Hilton formerly belonging to the monastery of Lindores, etc. which lands, Grange of Barry, Upper and Lower Barry Muir, and parts of Craigie Wester, and the town and lands of Craigie formerly belonged to the said Patrick Kyd, and were resigned for new infeftment; and the half of Craigie which formerly belonged to David Clayhills of Invergowrie, which were resigned in favour of the said Patrick Kyd, – erecting the said lands into the Barony of Craigie with the manor place of Craigie as the principal messuage.

On 5 April 1677, James Kyd of Woodhill was served heir to his father William Kyd of Woodhill in the house and lands of Woodhill, with the common of Barrymuir, in the barony of Barry, the tythes of the lands of Woodhill also in the barony of Barry and lordship of Balmerino, a third part of the house and lands of Halton of Craigie, or Wester Craigie in the baron] of Dundee, a sixth part of the house and lands of Hilton of Craigie on the sunny side of the lands of Hilton, a tenth of the teinds of the said house and lands of Hilton of Craigie, and half the lands of Craigie on the sunnyside – all erected into the barony of Craigie.

In entry number 471 dated 5 April 1677, included in The Register of the Great Seal of Scotland, Inquisitionum ad Capellam Regis Retornatorum, printed in 1811 at the command of King George III of the United Kingdom:

"Jacobus Kyd de Woodhill, heres Guilielmi Kid de Woodhill, patris, – in vlla et terris de Woodhill cum communia in mora nuncupata Barriemuire, et maresia vocata Barriemyre, infra baronium de Barrie – E. 26m. &c. feudiformae – decimis garbalibus dictarum terrarum de Woodhill, infra baronium de Barrie et dominum de Balmerinoch – E. 6s. et 8s. 4d. in augmentationem, feudiformae – tertia parte villae et terranum de Haltoun de Craigie nuncupata Wester Craigie, infra baronium de Dundie – A.E. 40s. N.E. 8l – sexta parte villae et terrarum de Hiltoun de Craigie, apud solarem partem terrarum de Hiltoune – E. 9l. 13s. 8d. feudiformae – decimis garbalibus praedicte villae et terrarum de Hiltoun de Craigie – A.E. 5s. N.E. 20s. – dimidietate terrarum de Craigie ad dictam solarem partem hujusmodi jacente – E. 14m. feudiformae – omnibus erectis in baroniam de Craigie."

Which roughly translates from the Latin to the English as:

"James Kid of Woodhill, the heir of William Kid of Woodhill, the father, – and on any of the lands of Woodhill and together with the community to be named Barriemuire, also called Barriemyre, of the barons of the Barrie – E. 26m., & c. feudiformae -, teind sheaves of the lands of the said Woodhill, of the barons of Barrie and lordship of Balmerinoch – E. 6s. and of 8s. 4d., in augmentation of, feudiformae – The third part of the town, and out of the Haltoun to be named out of the Wester Craigie of Craigie, below of the barons of the Dundie – AE 40s. N.E. 8l – the sixth part of the town, and out of the Hiltoun of the lands of Craigie, with the sunny side of the lands of the Hiltoune – E. 9l. 13s. 8d. feudiformae -, teind sheaves and of the aforesaid town and out of the Hiltoun of the lands of Craigie – AE 5s. N.E. 20s. – half of the lands of Craigie to the said part of the sunny side of this kind, lying – E. 14m. feudiformae – all raised to barony of Craigie."

Between the years 1676 and 1679, James Kid of Woodhill, son of William Kidd of Woodhill, was involved in a number of property transactions in Forfarshire. In 1681 the "barony of Craigs" (Craigie) is shown paying to the King of Scotland 10 pounds sterling.

By 1684 James Kid, then described as 'of Craigie' and his spouse Helen Fotheringham, appear in the Forfarshire Register of Sasines, again involved in a property transaction. In an entry dated 20 May 1687:

"Instrument of Sasine, proceeding on Disposition by James Kyd of Craigie in favour of Helen Fothringhame his spouse, in liferent, of 15 chalders of victual, of wheat, barley and meal proportionally, furth of the lands and barony of Craigie, in liferent, without prejudice to the liferent right of Margaret Wedderburne relict of Patrick Kyd of Craigie in terms of her jointure.

The Disposition is dated at Dundee 20 May 1687, Mr James Brisbane, advocate, is a witness. Sasine is given on 24 May same year: George Fothringhame of Bandean is a witness. Registered in the Particular Register of Sasines for Forfar 8 May 1687."

The Barony of Craigie remained in the hands of the Kidds until 1728 when the Barony of Craigie was sold by James Kid (aka James Kyd; 1666–1735) of Craigie to James Guthrie. James Kid, listed in the Testaments registered at St Andrews as "James Kyd", died on 22 October 1735.

=== Guthrie and Makgill families ===
Guthrie is an ancient place-name and surname in Forfarshire or Angus. The original Guthrie of Clan Guthrie was Sir David Guthrie who lived in the fifteenth century. He was Armour Bearer to James II of Scotland, also Sheriff of Angus, Lord High Treasurer of Scotland, among other major government posts. The Guthries of Craigie are descended from John Guthrie 1st of Hiltoun, fourth son of Sir Alexander Guthrie, 2nd Baron of Guthrie.

James Guthrie, (1669–1711), a Scottish merchant in Stockholm and later in Dundee, married Christian Scott, daughter of a Dundee merchant, on 23 April 1695.

The second son of James and Christian, James, was born on 28 March 1698, and married Elizabeth, daughter of David Gardyne of Middleton on 22 July 1733. She died on 25 July 1745, while he survived until 9 March 1788. James Guthrie of Hiltoun of Craigie and other lands, is recorded in a crown charter of 12 February 1729 also as James Guthrie 1st Baron of Craigie, 6 August 1764. In 1766 James Guthrie Jr. of Craigie bought the superiorities of the third part of Craigie from Dundee Town Council. According to the Directory of Landownership in Scotland circa 1770, the third greatest by value landowner in Dundee was Guthrie of Craigie, with his lands of Craigie worth £1500. The couple had a number of children, including James who became 2nd Baron Guthrie of Craigie.

James Guthrie of Craigie, 2nd Baron of Craigie, was born 15 May 1740, and married Emilia Murray, daughter of Alexander Murray of Lintrose, a merchant burgess, on 29 October 1767. She died on 7 November 1824, and he died 14 January 1830. James Guthrie of Craigie was granted Crown Charters on 5 July 1792, and 5 July 1815. He was admitted as a burgess of Dundee on 16 April 1817. He was described as having a "Moderate fortune. A family. Nephew to Panmure's factor. Will lean to that family." in the View of the Political State of Scotland in the Last Century: a Confidential Report: Political Opinions, Family Connections, or Personal Circumstances of the 2662 County Voters in 1788. The couple had a number of children including their eldest son James, a Lieutenant in the Royal Navy, who served under Captain Bligh on his famous voyage. Lieutenant James's health suffered during the voyage and he was invalided home but died on 10 July 1795 at Innsbruck. He had also served as First Lieutenant aboard Lord Hood's flagship Victory.

The second son was Alexander Murray Guthrie, born 8 December 1769, he married Margaret Makgill of the Kemback family, and died 31 December 1829. He was admitted as a burgess of Dundee on 6 August 1817 by right of his father James Guthrie of Craigie. Their only son James Guthrie duly inherited the lands, barony and title of 3rd Baron of Craigie on the death of his grandfather in 1830. On 10 May 1815, Alexander Murray Guthrie, son of James Murray Guthrie of Craigie, was served heir to his brother James Guthrie of Craigie who died 10 July 1795, in the estate of Craigie, Forfarshire. In 1815, there occurred a resignation by James Guthrie of the lands and barony of Guthrie in favour of Alexander Murray Guthrie.

David Charles Guthrie, the sixth son of James Guthrie of Craigie [1740–1830], was born 30 June 1788, and married Jane Campbell Hunter, daughter of Sir John Hunter, HM Consul General in Spain. He, like his brother Alexander Murray Guthrie, was admitted as a burgess of Dundee on 6 August 1817 by right of his father James Guthrie of Craigie. They had six children, of whom James Alexander Guthrie succeeded to the land and title.

James Guthrie of the Honourable East India Company Service was served heir to his grandfather James Guthrie of Craigie on 8 April 1846, and also to his father Alexander Murray Guthrie of Craigie on 11 January 1849. James Guthrie, the 3rd Baron of Craigie, died on 6 December 1866 unmarried. James left the lands and title of Craigie to his cousin, George Makgill of Kemback.

George Makgill of Kemback, the son of John Makgill of Kemback and Eliza Dalgleish, was born on 23 December 1812 and died 21 September 1878. He succeeded to the title of 9th Viscount of Oxfuird on 3 May 1817, de jure. He succeeded to the title of 9th Baronet Makgill on 3 May 1817, de jure. He succeeded to the title of 9th Lord Makgill of Cousland on 3 May 1817, de jure. George Makgill of Kemback sold the lands and title of Craigie to his kinsman James Alexander Guthrie in 1867.

James Alexander Guthrie of Craigie, born 8 September 1823, was a Justice of the Peace, a Deputy Lieutenant for Angus, and a Deputy Lieutenant for London. In 1858 he was elected Director of the Bank of England He was served heir to his father David Charles Guthrie, a merchant in London, who died 27 June 1859, in two farms of the lands of Craigie, 22 January 1860. In 1867 he purchased the lands and title of the barony of Craigie from George Makgill of Kemback. "The 1872 (Scotland) Owners of Land and Heritages return" stated that the trustees of James Alexander Guthrie of Craigie owned 309 acres in Angus. He married Elinor, daughter of Admiral Sir James Stirling, on 24 July 1856, and they had nine children. The eldest son David Charles Guthrie succeeded his father on his death at 78 Portland Place, London, on 17 January 1873.

David Charles Guthrie, 5th Baron of Craigie and later of East Haddon Hall, Northamptonshire, was born 25 July 1861. He became a Justice of the Peace, and Liberal Member of Parliament for South Northamptonshire from 1892 to 1895. He married Mary, daughter of Andrew Low of Savannah, Georgia, USA, on 21 November 1891, and had four children including James Alexander Guthrie, born 15 March 1893.

James Alexander Guthrie, 6th Baron of Craigie, was educated at Eton and the Royal Military College at Sandhurst, and served as a captain of the 15th Hussars. He was also a Fellow of the Zoological Society. He was married three times and had four children – David Charles Guthrie, born 1930, Jennifer Mary Guthrie, born 1933, James Murray Guthrie, born 1937, and Andrew Howard Guthrie, born 1945.

David Charles Guthrie, 7th Baron of Craigie, was born 6 December 1930. On 22 October 1958 he married Margaret Mary Brown, daughter of Harold Frederick Brown of Melbourne, Australia. He had two children – Stephen Patrick Guthrie, born 2 August 1959, and Richard Paul Guthrie, born 21 October 1964. He died in November 2003.

The Guthrie Tartan is Murray of Atholl, STA # 131.

The Barony of Craigie remained in the Guthrie family estate until it was passed by assignation to Rabbi Robert Owen Thomas, III in February 2011.

=== Thomas family ===
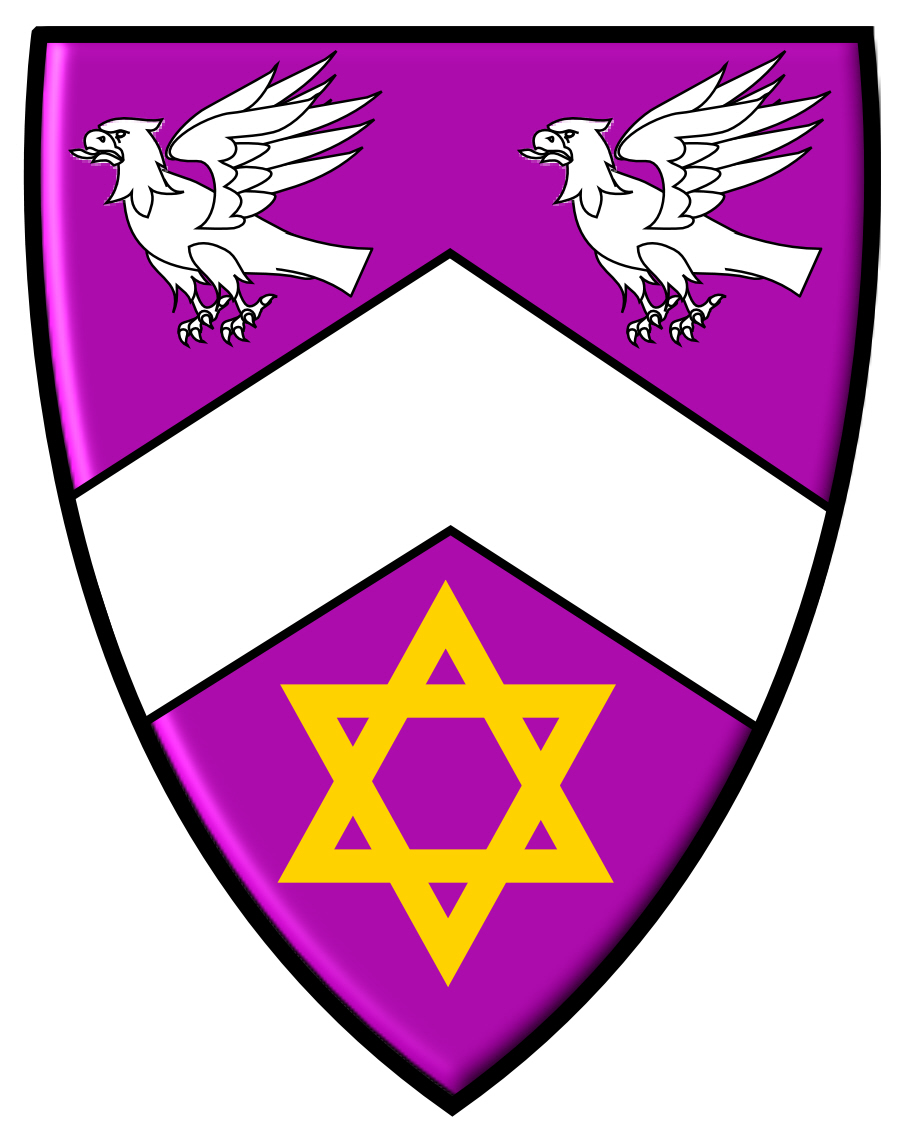
Arms granted by the Lord Lyon King of Arms to Rabbi Robert Thomas, the 1st Baron of Craigie.

The Thomas family is a Jewish family descended from forebears in Wales, Scotland, and England. The Thomas family traces their Welsh heritage to Llansamlet, Glamorgan, Wales, as far back as 1768.

The Much Honoured Rabbi Robert Owen Thomas, III, 1st Baron of Craigie, became baron in February 2011.

The 1st Baron of Craigie married Lauren Rose Lancaster, daughter of Samuel Pottinger Lancaster and Susan Beth Kaplan. The Baron and Baroness of Craigie have three children: Oliver Leigh Thomas, Younger of Craigie, The Honorable Ashlinn Elaine Thomas of Craigie, and Robert Owen Thomas, IV.

The heir apparent to the barony is Oliver Leigh Thomas, Younger of Craigie.

The Thomas Tartan is Thomas of Craigie, STA # 8412.

== See also ==
- List of Scottish feudal baronies
- List of places in Scotland
- List of British Jewish nobility and gentry

== Sources, external links ==
- Dr. David Dobson, researcher
- Dr. Julie Anya Guthrie, personal communication from the office of the Lord Lyon
- Senior-Milne, Graham (41st Baron of Mordington), The Feudal Baronies of Scotland (2005) peerage.org
- Scottish Barony Register
- The Register of the Great Seal of Scotland
- Inquisitionum ad Capellam Regis Retornatorum Abbreviatio (Edinburgh, 1811–1816)
- The Dundee Burgess Roll (a manuscript) archive.org
- The Register of Sasines nas.gov.uk
- The Guthries: a short history of the families of Guthrie, Craigie, and Torosay by J R Dalgetty, (Clan Guthrie, USA, 1985)
- Lost Dundee by McKean and Whatley (Birlinn, Edinburgh, 2008) ISBN 978 184158 562 8
- Dundee, Renaissance to Enlightentment by McKean, Harris, and Whatley, Dundee University Press, 2009, ISBN 978 184586 0165
- Angus or Forfarshire Alexander Johnston Warden, Google eBook, google.com
- The Barony of Craigie, The Demesne and Manor Farm of Craigie and Craigie House, Dundee by Dennis F. Collins
- The Statistical Account of Scotland, Account of 1791–99 vol.2: Craig, County of Forfar stat-acc-scot.edina.ac.uk
- The Statistical Account of Scotland, Account of 1834–45 vol.11 : Craig, County of Forfar stat-acc-scot.edina.ac.uk
- The baronage of Angus and Mearns by David MacGregor Peter books.google.com
- The Convention of The Baronage of Scotland scotsbarons.org
