= Clocksbriggs railway station =

Disused railway station in Forfar, Angus

Clocksbriggs
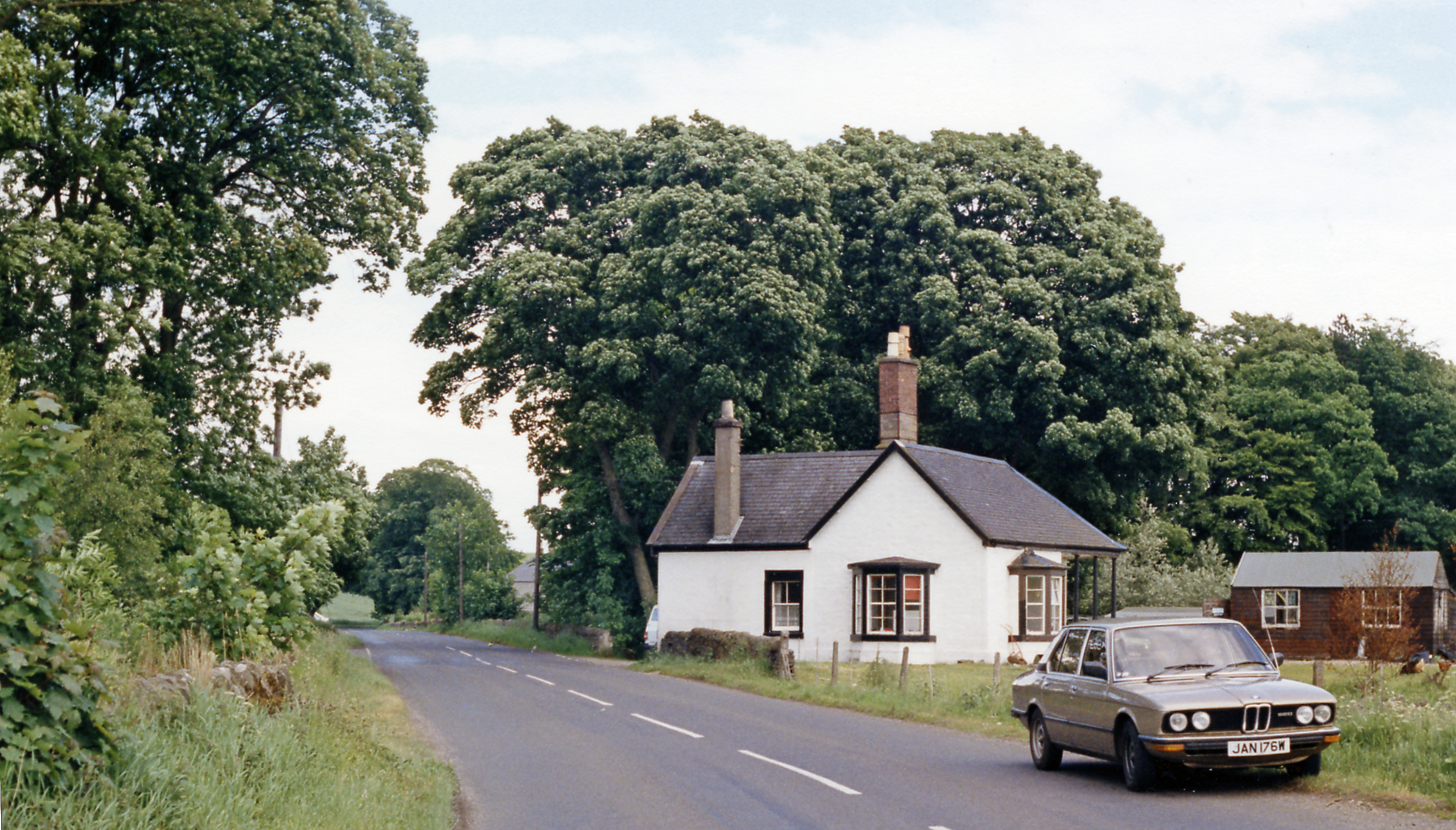
- The site of the station in 1988

General information
- Location: Forfar, Angus; Scotland
- Coordinates: 56.6564°N 2.8239°W
- Grid reference: NO495519
- Platforms: 2

Other information
- Status: Disused

History
- Original company: Aberdeen Railway
- Pre-grouping: Aberdeen Railway; Caledonian Railway
- Post-grouping: London, Midland and Scottish Railway

Key dates
- 1848: Opened
- 1 January 1917: Closed temporarily
- 1 June 1919: Reopened
- 5 December 1955: Closed to passengers
- 15 June 1964: Closed completely
Location

Clocksbriggs railway station served the town of Forfar, Angus, Scotland from 1848 to 1964 on the Arbroath and Forfar Railway.

== History ==
The station opened in 1848 by the Aberdeen Railway. It was situated north of Forfar Playfield and south of Auldbar Road station. The station closed temporarily on 1 January 1917, reopened on 1 June 1919, closed to passengers again on 5 December 1955 and to goods traffic on 15 June 1964. The site is now a private house.

Preceding station	Disused railways	Following station
Auldbar Road; Line and station closed	Arbroath and Forfar Railway	Forfar Playfield; Line and station closed
