= Torosay Castle =

Historic stately home on Isle of Mull, Scotland

Coordinates: 56°27′18″N 5°41′14″W

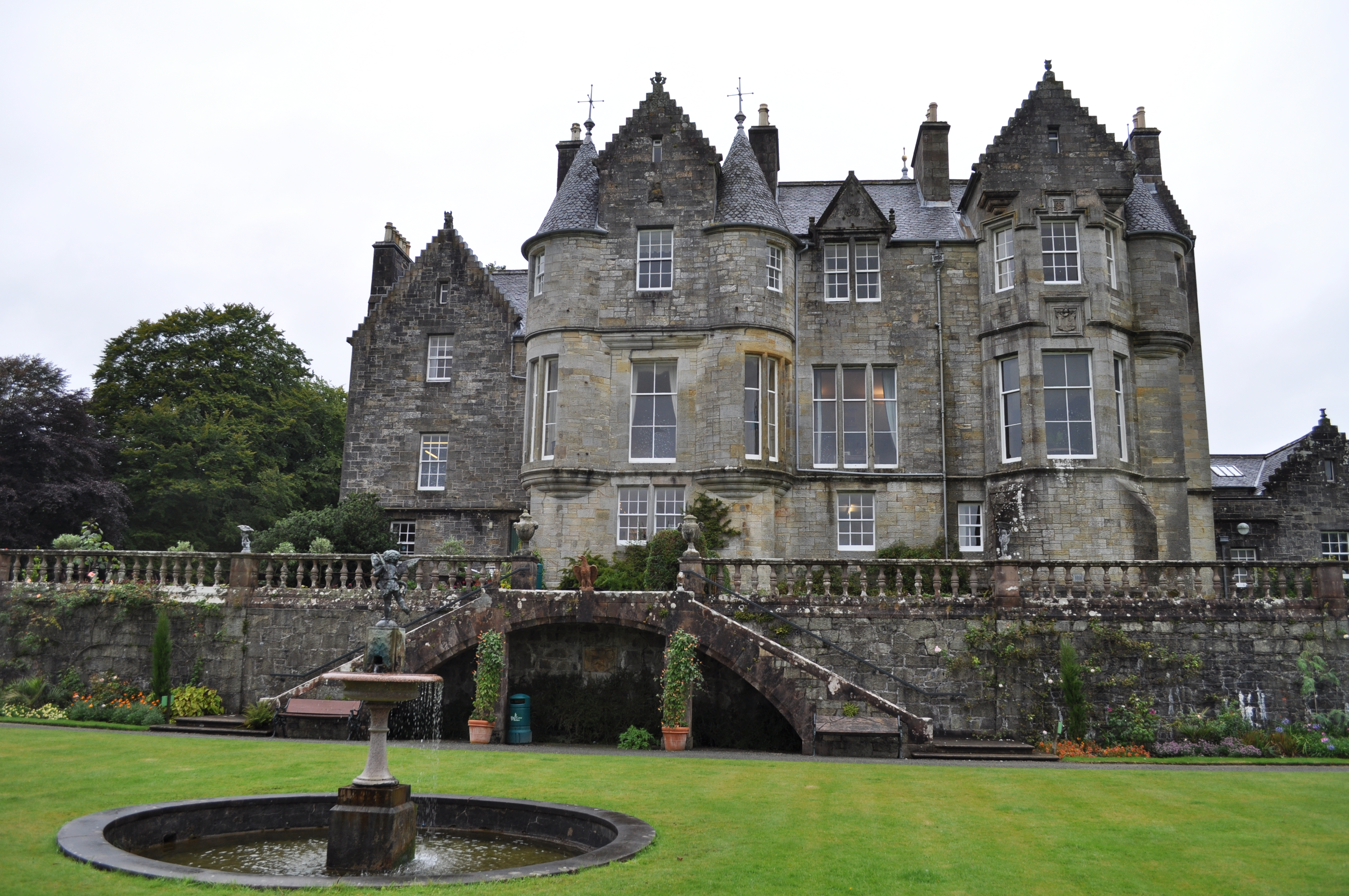
- The castle in 2010

Site information
- Owner: Campbell family
- Website: https://www.isle-of-mull.net/attractions/history/castles/torosay-castle/

Location

Site history
- Built: 1858
- Built by: Architect David Bryce

Listed Building – Category A
- Official name: Torosay Castle
- Designated: 20 July 1971
- Reference no.: LB17975

Inventory of Gardens and Designed Landscapes in Scotland
- Official name: Torosay Castle (Duart House)
- Designated: 30 June 1987
- Reference no.: GDL00376

Torosay Castle is a large house situated 1 1/2 miles (2.5 kilometres) south of Craignure, in the parish of Torosay, on the Isle of Mull, in the Scottish Inner Hebrides.

== Castle History ==
The buildings and gardens were listed by Historic Scotland in 1987. The agency indicates that the property was originally known as Duart House. One source explains that it was renamed Torosay to avoid confusing it with Duart Castle which is also located on the island, on the Sound of Mull.

It was designed by architect David Bryce for John Campbell of Possil (see Carter-Campbell of Possil) in the Scottish Baronial style. A history by Undiscovered Scotland provides these specifics:

"In the 1850s Colonel Campbell's son John inherited the estate, demolished the Georgian house, and commissioned Edinburgh architect David Bryce to produce something on a much grander scale. What was called at the time Duart House was completed in 1858".

In 1865, the property was sold to Arbuthnot Charles Guthrie and was owned by members of that family until 1911, when it was sold as a ruin to Sir Fitzroy Maclean who arranged to restore the castle. Following the sale of Guthrie Castle out of the Guthrie family, Torosay was generally acknowledged as the seat for Clan Guthrie.

Torosay is surrounded by 12 acres (5 hectares) gardens including formal terraces laid out at the turn of the 20th century and attributed to Sir Robert Lorimer. The castle and gardens used to be open to the public, being linked to the Craignure ferry terminal by the Isle of Mull Railway.

The garden's Statue Walk is made up of 19 statues in the style of Italian sculptor Antonio Bonazza. The statues were acquired by then-owner Walter Murray Guthrie from a derelict garden near Milan and shipped to Scotland for next to nothing as ballast in a cargo ship.

The novelist Angela du Maurier, older sister of Dame Daphne du Maurier, is said to have spent some time residing at Torosay with her close companion Olive Guthrie (great grandmother of the present owner). Angela dedicated her book Weep No More (1940) to "Olive Guthrie of Torosay." Other visitors during the 1930s included Winston Churchill (Olive Guthrie was his aunt by marriage) and King George of Greece.

=== 21st century ===
The castle was sold in 2012 by Christopher Guthrie-James, the fifth laird of Torosay Castle. The new owner, the McLean Fund, closed it for renovations; it was occupied again in December 2013 by a private family. Guthrie-James said, "it was with a sense of relief, rather than regret, that we sold the family home at Torosay." Kenneth Donald McLean, sixth laird, has spent more than £1 million renovating the castle and gardens. The castle is permanently closed to the public. The gardens are open on the first Sunday in the month from April to October.

A report published in March 2017 referred to the new owner as "Madame von Speyr, whose charity, the Dew Cross Centre for Moral Technology, is said to be based here". The charity, however, listed its base as Edinburgh in 2019.

=== Champagne find ===
In July 2008, the then oldest bottle of Veuve Clicquot champagne was discovered inside a sideboard in Torosay Castle. The 1893 bottle was in mint condition. It is believed to have been locked inside the dark sideboard since at least 1897. The champagne is now on display at the Veuve Clicquot visitor centre in Reims, France, and regarded as "priceless".

== Gallery ==
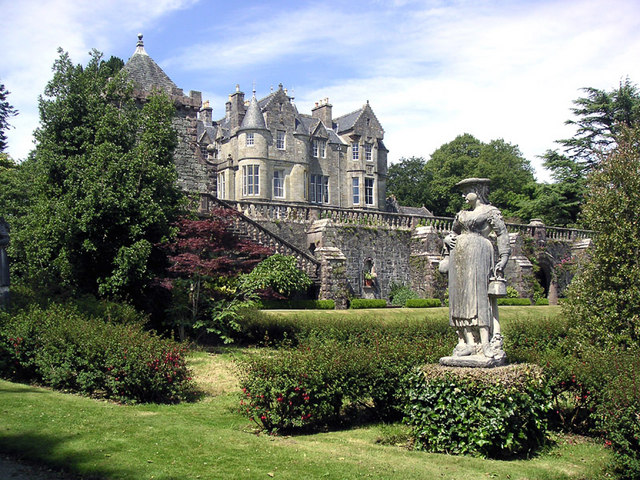
Castle grounds

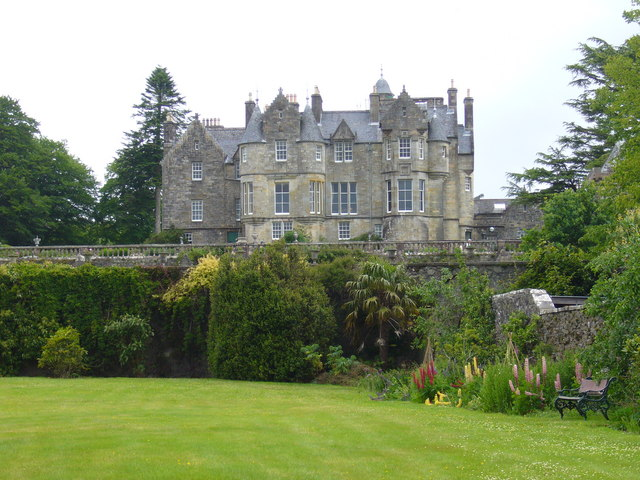
The castle in 2008

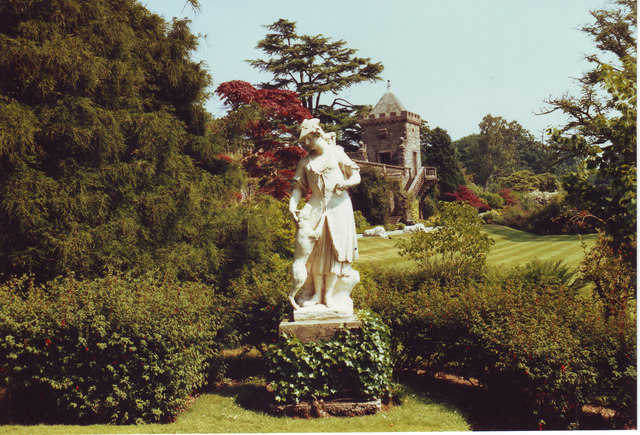
Gardens at Torosay Castle

The Campbell of Possil coat of arms

Costilla
