= David Guthrie =

David Guthrie may refer to:

- David Guthrie (New Zealand politician) (1856–1927)
- Sir David Guthrie (lord treasurer) (fl. 1457–1479), lord treasurer of Scotland in 1461
- David Guthrie (British politician) (1861–1918)
