= Glasterlaw railway station =

Disused railway station in Glasterlaw, Angus

Glasterlaw
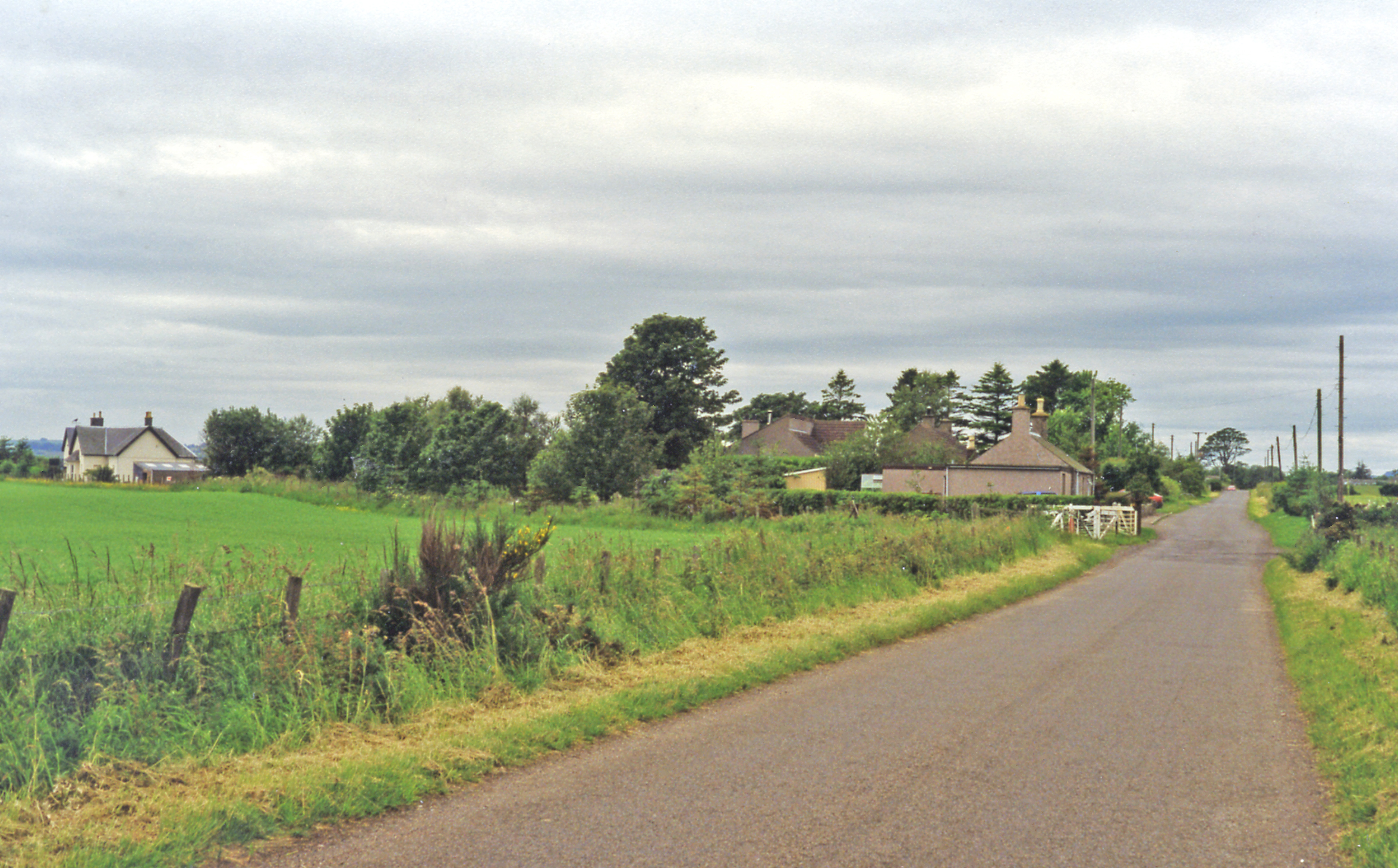
- The site of the station in 1997

General information
- Location: Glasterlaw, Angus; Scotland
- Coordinates: 56.651°N 2.6592°W
- Grid reference: NO596512
- Platforms: 2

Other information
- Status: Disused

History
- Original company: Aberdeen Railway
- Pre-grouping: Aberdeen Railway; Caledonian Railway
- Post-grouping: London, Midland and Scottish Railway

Key dates
- 1 February 1848: Opened
- 2 April 1951: Closed to passengers
- 11 June 1956: Closed completely
Location

Glasterlaw railway station served the area of Glasterlaw, Angus, Scotland from 1848 to 1956 on the Aberdeen Railway.

== History ==
The station opened on 1 February 1848 by the Aberdeen Railway. The goods yard was to the north. The station closed to passengers on 2 April 1951 and to goods traffic on 11 June 1956.

Preceding station	Disused railways	Following station
Farnell Road; Line and station closed	Aberdeen Railway	Guthrie; Line and station closed
Leysmill; Line and station closed	Arbroath and Forfar Railway	Guthrie; Line and station closed
