= Auldbar Road railway station =

Disused railway station in Angus, Scotland

Coordinates: 56.64778°N 2.75736°W

Auldbar Road
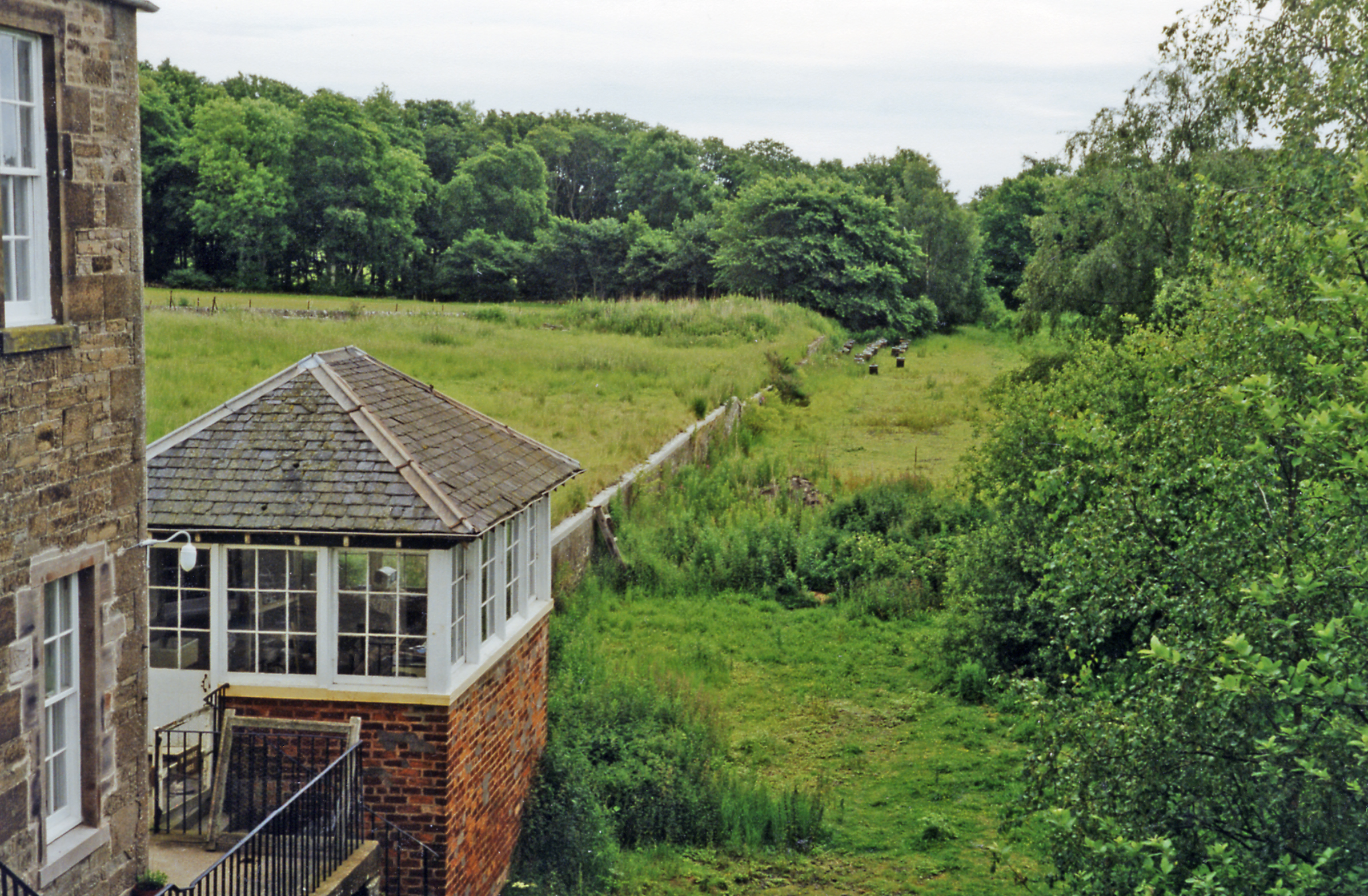
- Remains of the station (1997)

General information
- Location: Angus; Scotland
- Platforms: 2

Other information
- Status: Disused

History
- Original company: Arbroath and Forfar Railway
- Pre-grouping: Caledonian Railway
- Post-grouping: London Midland and Scottish Railway

Key dates
- 4 December 1838: Station opens
- 11 June 1956: Station closes
Location

Auldbar Road railway station was located near the town of Guthrie in the Scottish county of Angus.

== History ==
Opened by the Arbroath and Forfar Railway, and absorbed into the Caledonian Railway, it became part of the London, Midland and Scottish Railway during the Grouping of 1923. Passing on to the Scottish Region of British Railways on nationalisation in 1948, it was then closed by the British Rail.

Passenger trains ceased on 11 June 1956 but freight traffic still used the line and station until September 1965 when the last freight train called at the station.

Preceding station	Historical railways	Following station
Guthrie	Caledonian Railway; Arbroath and Forfar Railway	Clocksbriggs

== The site today ==
Although the wooden buildings on the platforms have gone, the platforms and some other buildings such as the station house and signal box remain.
