= Colliston railway station =

Former railway station in Angus, Scotland

Coordinates: 56.6033°N 2.6228°W

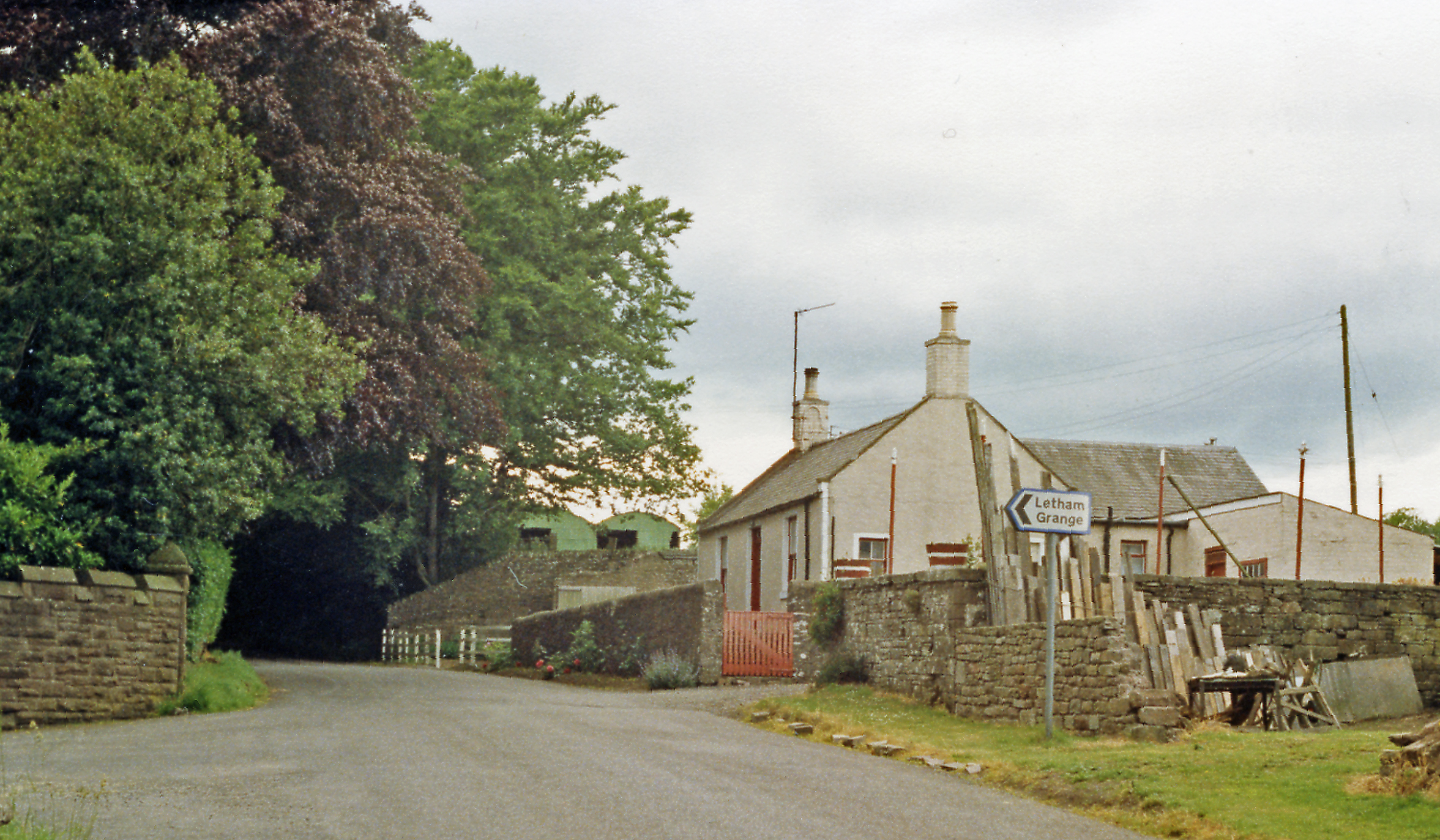
Site of former Colliston railway station, taken in 1988

Colliston railway station was a railway station at Colliston near Arbroath in Scotland.

The station was opened on 24 November 1838 by the Arbroath and Forfar Railway. The station was closed to passengers on 5 December 1955.

Preceding station	Disused railways	Following station
Leysmill; Line and station closed	Caledonian Railway; Arbroath and Forfar Railway	Arbroath Catherine Street; Line and station closed
Leysmill; Line and station closed	Caledonian Railway; Arbroath and Forfar Railway	Arbroath (new); Line closed, station open
