= Forfar railway station =

Disused railway station in Forfar, Angus

Forfar
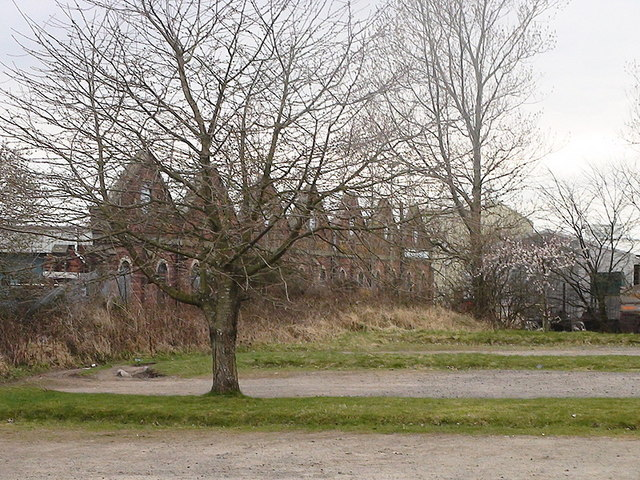
- The site of the station in 2009

General information
- Location: Forfar, Angus; Scotland
- Platforms: 2

Other information
- Status: Disused

History
- Original company: Scottish Midland Junction Railway
- Pre-grouping: Scottish Midland Junction Railway; Scottish North Eastern Railway; Caledonian Railway
- Post-grouping: LMS

Key dates
- 2 August 1848: Opened
- 4 September 1967: Closed for passengers
- 1982: closed for freight

Forfar railway station served the town of Forfar, Angus, Scotland from 1848 to 1967 on the Scottish Midland Junction Railway. It was the second station in Forfar, following the earlier Forfar Playfield railway station terminus.

== History ==
The station opened on 2 August 1848 by the Scottish Midland Junction Railway. There was a goods yard to the north which was extant when the first station opened. The station closed to passengers traffic on 4 September 1967, and the infrequent freight traffic stopped by 1982.

Preceding station	Disused railways	Following station
Terminus	Scottish Midland Junction Railway	Kirriemuir Junction; Line and station closed
