= Dan Peña =

American businessman

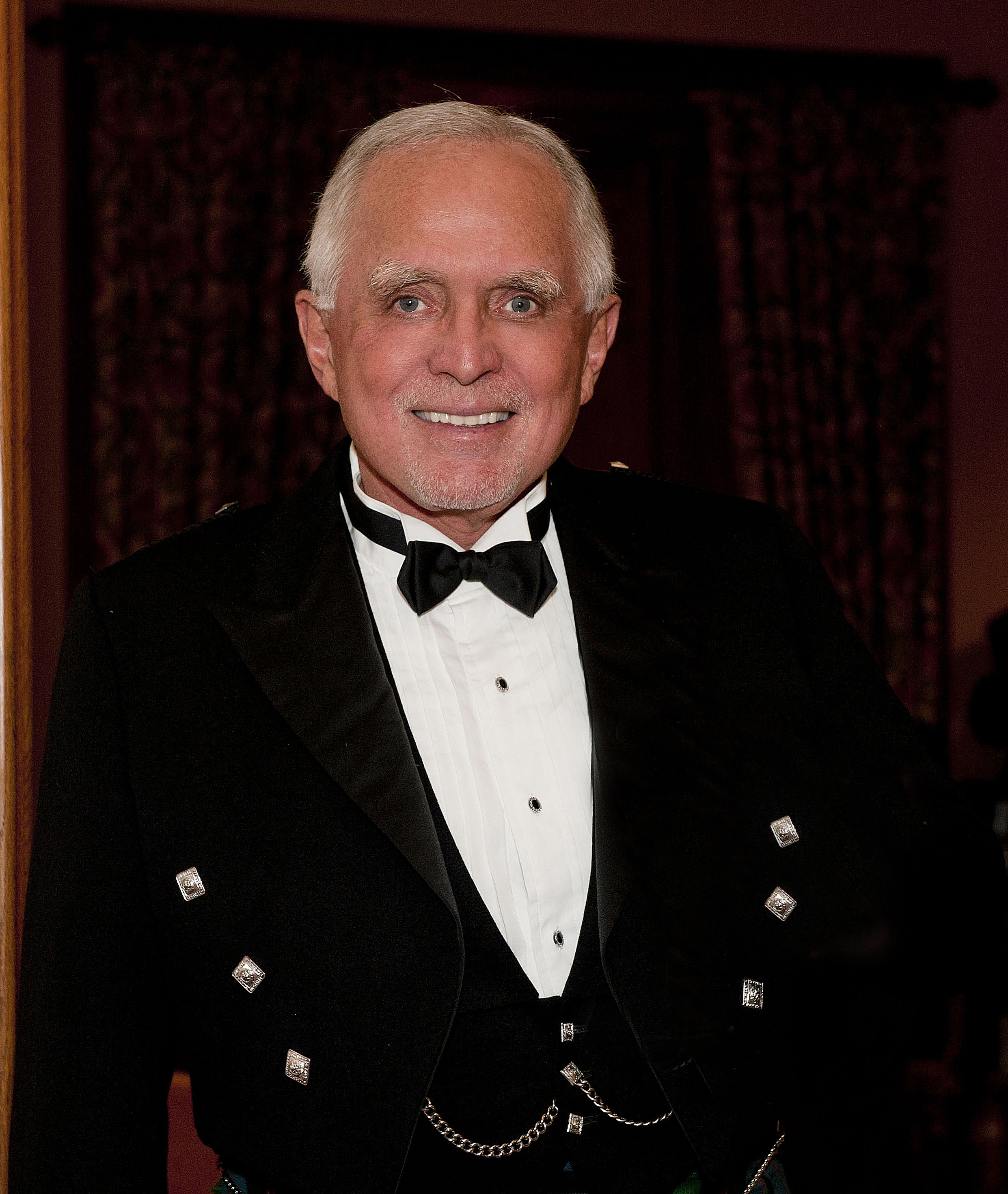
- Dan Peña at Guthrie Castle
- Born: Daniel Steven Peña; August 10, 1945 (age 80); Jacksonville, Florida, U.S.
- Education: San Fernando Valley State College (now CSUN) (BS)
- Occupation: Businessman
- Website: danpena.co.uk

Daniel Steven Peña Sr. (born August 10, 1945) is an American–British businessman.

== Early life ==
Peña is Mexican American and was raised in East Los Angeles, California. His family moved to Encino when he was 10 years old. In 1971, he graduated from San Fernando Valley State College School of Business Administration and Economics with a Bachelor of Science degree in Business Administration.

Peña's mother was from Mexico and is from both Austrian and Spanish descent. His father, who was from New Mexico, was one of the first Mexican American detectives in the Los Angeles Police Department and later worked in a secret CIA unit where he oversaw an investigation into the death of Robert F. Kennedy.

== Career ==
Peña began his career as a financial analyst on Wall Street. He went on to become president of Great Western Resources, Inc., a Houston-based oil company listed on the London Stock Exchange in 1984. In a move backed by shareholders, Peña was ousted as president of the company in 1992 and subsequently awarded $3.3 million by an American jury, after suing the company over his dismissal.

In 1984, Peña bought Guthrie Castle in Angus, Scotland, where he lives and from which he has operated several businesses.

In 2017, the castle and estate manager employed by Peña at Guthrie Castle was found to have committed fraud by double or triple booking wedding facilities and paying the hire charges into their own account. Peña said he forgave the employee and covered the £130,000 stolen from clients.

Peña refers to himself as the "trillion-dollar man." He works as a motivational speaker and is known for his brash persona.

=== Politics ===
Peña ran as an independent candidate in the 2024 UK general election in the Angus and Perthshire Glens constituency, running under the slogan, "Make Angus Great Again". He polled just 733 votes (1.5 percent) of the votes cast, coming sixth out of six candidates. The seat was won by the Scottish National Party candidate.

Peña made several provocative statements during his parliamentary run, repeatedly endorsing violent methods. At a town hall meeting addressing voters, he said, "I know how to get things done now and there’s always going to be collateral damage...There will be blood on the streets and some of your blood may be that blood. What are you willing to sacrifice?" He strongly criticized the SNP, referring to the party as "brain dead" and supporters as "fucked up beyond all recognition," and former SNP leader Nicola Sturgeon, who he falsely claimed imposed a gag order preventing him from criticizing her. Peña also said Sturgeon would have been burnt at the stake in another era.

Peña's lawyer argued he was speaking metaphorically when referring to violence.

Peña also unsuccessfully applied for the position of Chief Executive of the Scottish National Party, replacing Sturgeon's husband Peter Murrell, in 2023. While he opposes Scottish independence, Peña argued that, "if the SNP went down in flames, the by-product would be yet more Scottish unemployment."

Peña is a climate change denier, and in 2017 claimed climate change was "the greatest fraud that has been perpetrated on mankind this century."

== Personal life ==
Peña is a dual citizen of the United Kingdom and the United States.
