= Forfar Playfield railway station =

Disused railway station in Forfar, Angus

Coordinates: 56°38′54″N 2°53′05″W

Forfar Playfield

General information
- Location: Forfar, Angus; Scotland
- Platforms: 2

Other information
- Status: Disused

History
- Original company: Arbroath & Forfar Railway

Key dates
- 4 December 1838: Opened as Forfar
- 1848: Name changed to Forfar Playfield
- 2 August 1848: Closed
Location

Forfar Playfield railway station was the original terminal station that served the town of Forfar, Angus, Scotland from 1838 to 1848 on the Arbroath and Forfar Railway. This was the first station to serve Forfar. A through-station, Forfar railway station, on the line alignment to the Scottish Midland Junction Railway south of Clocksbriggs.opened a decade later.

== History ==
The station opened as Forfar on 4 December 1838 by the Arbroath and Forfar Railway. The station's name was changed to Forfar Playfield in 1848, although it closed later in the same year on 2 August.
