= Guthrie railway station =

Disused railway station in Guthrie, Angus

Guthrie
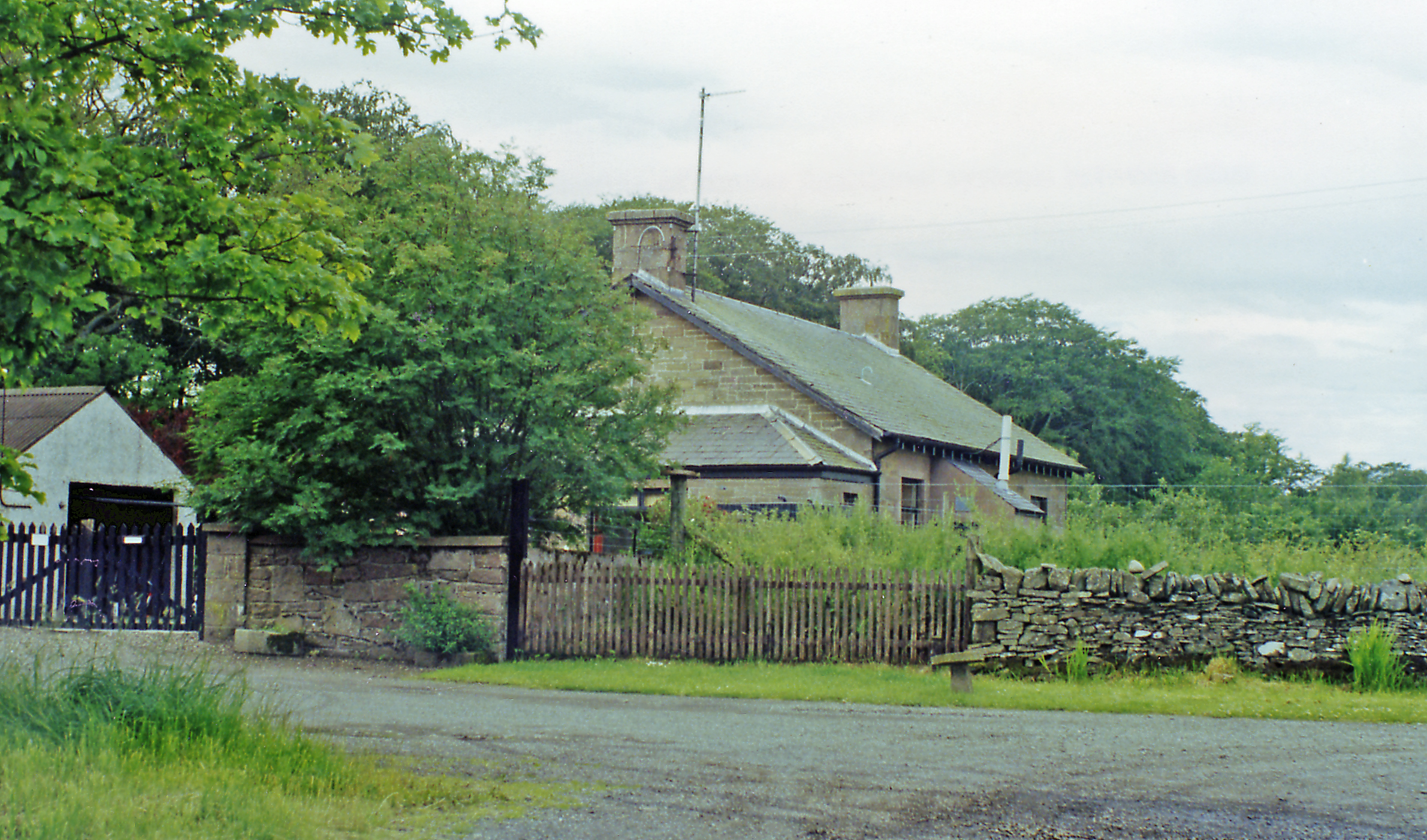
- The site of the station, looking west towards Forfar, in 1997

General information
- Location: Guthrie, Angus; Scotland
- Coordinates: 56.6401°N 2.7079°W
- Grid reference: NO566500
- Platforms: 2

Other information
- Status: Disused

History
- Original company: Arbroath and Forfar Railway
- Pre-grouping: Arbroath and Forfar Railway; Caledonian Railway
- Post-grouping: London, Midland and Scottish Railway

Key dates
- 4 December 1838: Opened
- 5 December 1955: Closed to passengers
- 3 August 1959: Closed to goods
Location

Guthrie railway station served the village of Guthrie, Angus, Scotland from 1838 to 1955 on the Arbroath and Forfar Railway.

== History ==
The station opened on 4 December 1838 by the Arbroath and Forfar Railway. It closed to passengers on 5 December 1955 and closed to goods on 3 August 1959.

| Preceding station | Disused railways | Following station |
|---|---|---|
| Friockheim; Line and station closed | Arbroath and Forfar Railway | Auldbar Road; Line and station closed |
