= Arbroath Catherine Street railway station =

Disused railway station in Arbroath, Angus

Coordinates: 56.5594°N 2.5885°W

Arbroath Catherine Street

General information
- Location: Arbroath, Angus; Scotland

Other information
- Status: Disused

History
- Original company: Aberdeen Railway

Key dates
- 3 January 1839: Opened
- 1 February 1848: Closed
Location

Arbroath Catherine Street railway station served the town of Arbroath, Angus, Scotland from 1839 to 1848 on the Arbroath and Forfar Railway.

== History ==
The station opened on 3 January 1839 by the Aberdeen Railway. A goods line continued to the east that served Arbroath Harbour. There was also a trainshed and a locomotive shed. The station closed on 1 February 1848 but it remained open as a goods shed.

Preceding station	Disused railways	Following station
Terminus	Arbroath and Forfar Railway	Colliston; Line and station closed
