= David Guthrie (lord treasurer) =

Lord Treasurer of Scotland

Sir David Guthrie (fl. 1479), was lord treasurer of Scotland in 1461.

Guthrie was the son of Alexander Guthrie of Kincaldrum. From 25 March 1466, when David Guthrie recovered the barony and estates of Guthrie granted to his family by David II but afterwards sold, his full title was Sir David Guthrie of Guthrie and Kincaldrum. In 1457 he was Sheriff of Forfar. From his youth he was bred up about the court, and became armour-bearer to James II, afterwards rising high in favour with James III. During James III's minority Guthrie was made lord treasurer (in 1461) by the queen-mother. On 15 October 1466 Sir David Guthrie became comptroller of the household. In March 1467 he again appears in the official deeds as treasurer, and in November as comptroller, his name occurring in the royal charters for 1468 in the same position as when treasurer, but without the designation, the probability being that he continued to hold both posts.

On 10 August 1468 Sir David Guthrie appears as clerk of the register, and the next year, owing to a change in the ministry, was made Master of the Rolls, his name again appearing as comptroller in November 1470. In April 1472 he went as one of the Scottish plenipotentiaries to meet the English commissioners at Newcastle, where a truce to last from 20 April 1472 till July 1483 was concluded. He was appointed Lord chief justice of Scotland in 1473; the last official mention of his name is as justiciary in 1474, but he certainly survived till 1479. 'In the time of his greatness he much enlarged his estate', and founded and endowed a collegiate church at Guthrie for a provost and three prebends (increased by his eldest son to eight), and confirmed by a bull from Sixtus IV, dated at Rome 14 June 1479.

Sir David Guthrie married twice, first a daughter of Sir Thomas Maule of Panmure, and secondly one of the Dundases. His eldest son, Alexander Guthrie, a grandson, three sons-in-law, and a nephew were all slain at Battle of Flodden, 1513.
