= Arbroath and Forfar Railway =

Early railway in Scotland

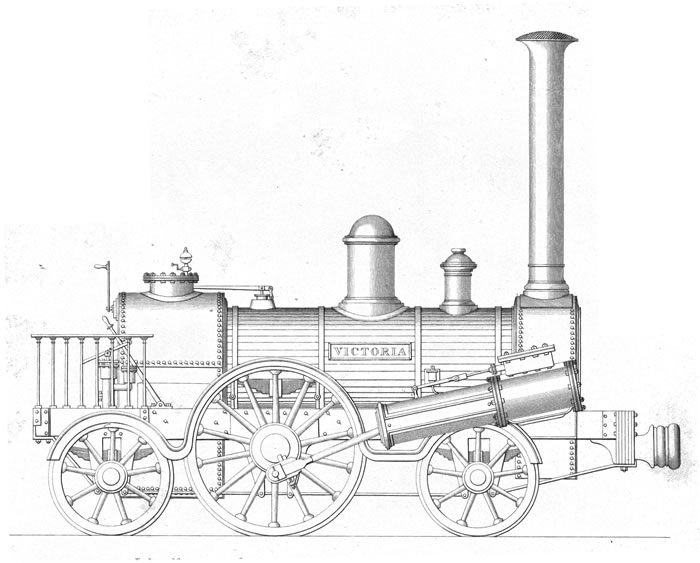
James Stirling and Co 2-2-2 locomotive for the Arbroath and Forfar Railway

The Arbroath and Forfar Railway (A&FR) was a railway that connected Forfar with the port town of Arbroath, in Scotland.

It opened in 1838–1839 and it was successful in making an operating profit, but it was always desperately short of capital. It used the track gauge of 5 ft 6 in (1,676 mm).

When the Aberdeen Railway was authorised in 1845, it leased the Arbroath and Forfar line to form part of its main line connecting Forfar and Aberdeen; it opened in 1848. The Aberdeen Railway was to be a standard gauge line and the A&FR had to alter its track gauge. The A&FR line formed part of the main line from Stirling to Aberdeen, and when the North British Railway started running to Aberdeen in 1881, their trains too ran over a very short section of the A&FR.

Nearly all of the A&FR line was closed in 1967 when the former North British Railway route was selected as the only route to Aberdeen, and the short section immediately north of Arbroath is the only section of the A&FR still in use.

== History ==
=== Conception and authorisation ===
In the early years of the nineteenth century there was an explosion in the volume of textile production in Forfarshire as industrialisation was introduced. The transport of raw materials and lime for agricultural purposes to inland towns, and of the finished products to market, were hampered by poor transport facilities. In 1817 the magistrates of Arbroath considered the construction of a canal to Forfar, but the proposal was not adopted. As the need for improved transport links became more pressing, the idea of a railway was proposed. In 1826 Stevenson and Blackadder surveyed a railway route; they planned an inclined plane to descend into Arbroath; the final approach to the harbour was to have been through the streets. This scheme too did not proceed, but it was revived in 1824, by which time a waggonway was a viable alternative; Robert Stevenson supervised the survey. The route would have involved a rope-worked inclined plane to descend to Arbroath Harbour; it too was not progressed.

In 1835 a number of prominent citizens of Arbroath commissioned a review of possible routes for a railway, examining the waggonway proposal; technology had now proceeded to the point where a railway was the natural transport medium. The Edinburgh firm of railway engineers Grainger and Miller had been commissioned to carry out the review, and they proposed a route rather different to Stevenson's. The Dundee and Newtyle Railway had opened in 1832 and involved street running in Dundee itself, but this was now seen as undesirable, and the final access to Arbroath Harbour was changed to be on dedicated land. The estimated cost of construction was £36,871, and the scheme was launched to the public at a meeting of 7 August 1835; £40,000 was subscribed within a month. A local man, William Lindsay Carnegie, was the dynamic force in promoting the railway scheme.

Grainger and Miller were instructed to carry out a detailed survey of the route so as to present a parliamentary bill. Hostility was encountered from the owner of Guthrie Castle, and from the turnpike trustees, and considerable revision to the initial route was made. As the planning progressed, there was also a large increase in the price of materials, particularly iron for rails and chairs, and Grainger and Miller increased their estimate of cost to £70,000.

Grainger and Miller selected the track gauge of 5 ft 6 in (1,676 mm) as it seemed to them a suitable gauge; it was also proposed for the neighbouring Dundee and Arbroath Railway (for which they were the engineers). They had already used 4 ft 6 in on the coal lines of Lanarkshire, and were planning 4 ft 8.5 in for the Edinburgh and Glasgow Railway, so clearly the idea of a railway network was not yet known to them. Whishaw later reported that the engineer, Mr Grainger,

considers the English gauge [of 4ft 8½in] too narrow, and the Great Western gauge [of 7ft 0¼in] too wide; he has, therefore, taken something like a mean, which would enable him to allow sufficient space for the proper construction of the locomotive engines, and also afford more useful space in the carriages.

Arbroath and Forfar Railway Act 1836
- Act of Parliament
- Parliament of the United Kingdom
- Long title: An Act for making and maintaining a Railway between the Royal Burgh of Arbroath in the County of Forfar and the Royal Burgh of Forfar in the same County.
- Citation: 6 & 7 Will. 4. c. xxxiv

Dates
- Royal assent: 19 May 1836

Text of statute as originally enacted

The parliamentary bill was submitted to the 1836 session. Fierce opposition was experienced, chiefly from the turnpike trustees. Nonetheless the act was duly authorised on 19 May as the Arbroath and Forfar Railway Act 1836 (6 & 7 Will. 4. c. xxxiv) for a line from the harbour at Arbroath to Forfar. In the same session the Dundee and Arbroath Railway (D&AR) was authorised; it too was to run to the harbour at Arbroath.

The desirability of the two lines connecting was obvious, and it was agreed that this would be at Almericloss (adjoining Catherine Street). Old Almerie Close was a gentleman's residence off Guthrie Port immediately east of the Brothock Water, and New Almerie Close was a gentleman's residence near the junction of the present-day Bridge Street and Weavers Court. (Note: There are several variations of the spelling in use.) This was very close to the main line of the Arbroath and Forfar line, and the significance of Almericloss is simply that a connection between the two lines there was contemplated.

However at this stage the Dundee and Arbroath line was to follow closely the sea front into Arbroath from the west, and reaching Almericloss was impracticable. The D&AR surveyed an alternative entry to Arbroath, described as the high level line, but the extra cost of this deterred actual implementation of the route, and although the authorising acts of Parliament for both companies referred to branches to Almericloss, there was no definite agreement to build them.

=== Construction and opening ===
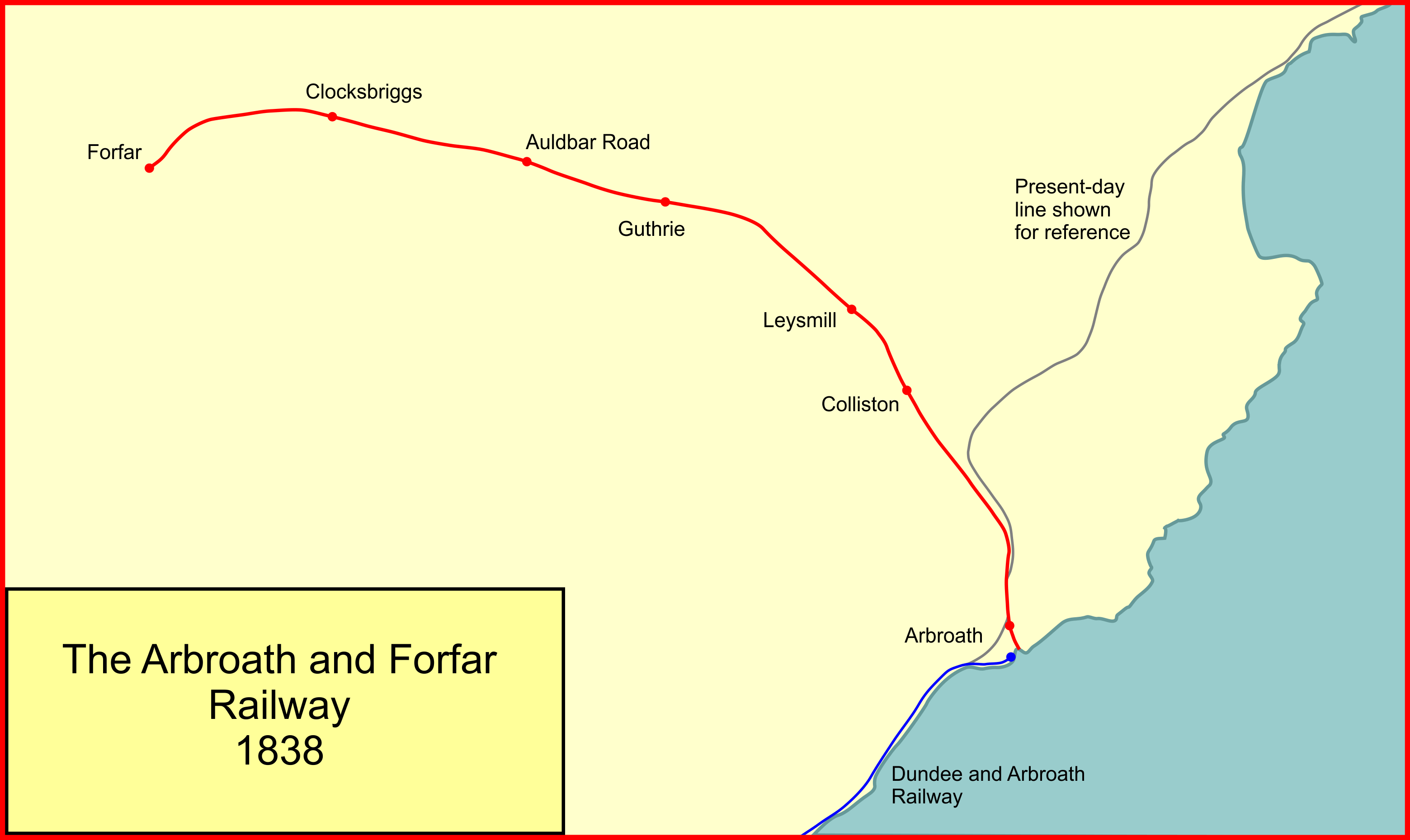
The Arbroath and Forfar Railway in 1838

Grainger and Miller designed the railway as a single line with passing places every 600 yards (550 metres) or so; (Note: It is not clear whether this arrangement was actually implemented; by the time the railway was built the more conventional system of more widely spaced passing places and timetabled train movements seems to have prevailed.) this was their custom at the time, based on horse-drawn waggonways with no fixed timetable. The track was to consist of rails on stone blocks, and the track gauge was to be 5 ft 6in (1,384 mm).

At this stage the directors realised there was no body of experience regarding locomotives, and Grainger was commissioned to tour the manufacturers and users of locomotives to determine the appropriate specification.

Cash flow soon became a serious problem; the Company found that many subscribers failed to respond to calls (Note: Subscribers only had to pay a small deposit at first; as work progressed, the Company would "call" for incremental payments in stages, but in the worsening financial climate, many initial subscribers defaulted.) and the company had to take a loan of £15,000 from the British Linen Bank. Contractors too had a problem; small concerns found it difficult to pay workers currently even though they would be paid later.

Castellated bridge at Guthrie Castle

The owner of Guthrie Castle made considerable objections to the railway, claiming that it would diminish his amenity. After much negotiation he was allocated £1,400 by the A&FR to build a railway bridge over his entrance gateway in an ornate style. It was "convincingly disguised as a castellated entry to the castle's main drive, [consisting] of a perpendicular Gothic archway flanked by octagonal towers with castellated tops and lancet windows."

The expenditure on land acquisition, construction and rolling stock all exceeded the estimates, and as the construction neared completion, successive increases were tabled, ending at £103,904. Two quarries were gearing up in anticipation of the advantage of rail connection: at Letham and Leysmill, within about 5 miles (8 km) of Forfar. In October 1838 some mineral traffic from the quarries to Forfar was carried. From Saturday 24 November 1838 passenger traffic between Forfar and Leysmill was started, using horse traction as the locomotives were not ready. On 3 December 1838 the first locomotive was ready and the line was fully opened from Forfar to Arbroath. (Note: Ferguson, page 30; Carter and Awdry say 3 January 1839; Thomas and Turnock say Arbroath to Guthrie 4 December 1838 and Guthrie to Forfar 1 March 1839.)

=== Early operations ===
There were two passenger trains each way at first. (Note: Apparently seven days a week.) With only one locomotive, Victoria, primitive in its technology at this early date, reliability was soon an issue. Between 4 and 13 December Victoria was out of service and horse haulage had to be resorted to. In January, Victoria was derailed at Arbroath, again necessitating horse traction. On 15 March 1839 a second locomotive, Caledonia, was delivered. The passenger service was increased to three daily trains. Goods and mineral traffic was picking up to the extent that additional wagons, and materials to make additional sidings, had to be procured. Trips to and from the Leysmill quarry were additional to the other train services, and the shortage of wagons meant that empty wagons returned there were reloaded at once; the locomotive often returned to Arbroath to get water while the loading took place.

On 14 May 1839 the third locomotive was delivered; it was named Britannia. All the locomotives were of the 2-2-2 wheel arrangement. Traffic continued to increase steadily and at the annual general meeting in June 1839 weekly passenger journeys of more than 1,500 and weekly goods carryings of over 800 tons were reported, leading to a profit for the half-year of £3,614. However the positive revenue position was underlain by heavy indebtedness, £35,000 being owed to banks.

In mid-August the passenger train service was further enhanced to four trains each way daily.

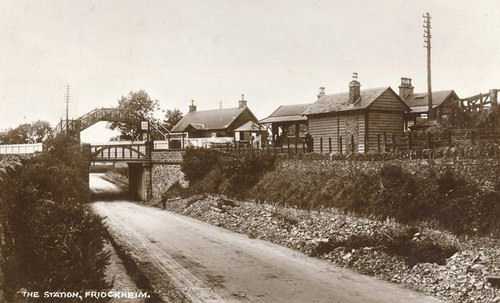
Friockheim station from an old postcard

Arbroath and Forfar Railway Act 1840
- Act of Parliament
- Parliament of the United Kingdom
- Long title: An Act to enable the Arbroath and Forfar Railway Company to raise a further Sum of Money, and otherwise to amend and enlarge the Powers and Provisions of the Act relating to the Arbroath and Forfar Railway.
- Citation: 3 & 4 Vict. c. xiv

Dates
- Royal assent: 3 April 1840
Other legislation
Amends	Arbroath and Forfar Railway Act 1836

Text of statute as originally enacted

To resolve the shortage of capital, which was preventing very obviously needed improvements, an act, the Arbroath and Forfar Railway Act 1840 (3 & 4 Vict. c. xiv) authorising an increase in share capital was passed on 3 April 1840; it authorised an additional £55,000 of capital.

Writing in 1842 following a site visit in 1841, Francis Whishaw reported that

We were much surprised, when examining this line in September last, to see a party of reapers travelling by the third-class railway-carriages in preference to walking to their work; and we found on enquiry that this was by no means an isolated case, but of everyday occurrence. In fact, with the low fares adopted on this line, it is more economical for the poor man to ride than to walk.

The line ran from "near the harbour" at Arbroath, with a passenger station at Catherine Street. The line ran broadly north to the kirk at St Vigean's (where the present-day line diverges right), and then continued north-west to Friockheim and then west to Guthrie and Forfar. The Forfar station was in the angle between Playfield (now Victoria Street) and Bailiewellbrae Road (now Carsburn Road).

The line rose about 221 feet (67 m) from Arbroath to Forfar: the steepest gradient was 1 in 130 (7.7‰), and the curvature was gentle. The length of the line was a little over 15 miles (24.1 km). Although opened as a single line, the formation was made for a double line.

In common with the neighbouring Dundee and Arbroath Railway, it had a track gauge of 5 ft 6 in (1,676 mm). The track was formed of parallel (i.e. not fish-belly) rails of 48 pounds per yard (24 kg/m) on timber cross-sleepers. The turntables were 12 feet (3.7 m) in diameter. (This refers to wagon turntables, commonly used at this date for siding connections.)

Apart from the terminal stations, there were six intermediate stations at Colliston, Leysmill, Friockheim, Guthrie, Auldbar Road, and Clocksbriggs, though at the start, "no great expense had been incurred in the erection of intermediate station-houses".

=== Linking with the Dundee and Forfar Railway ===
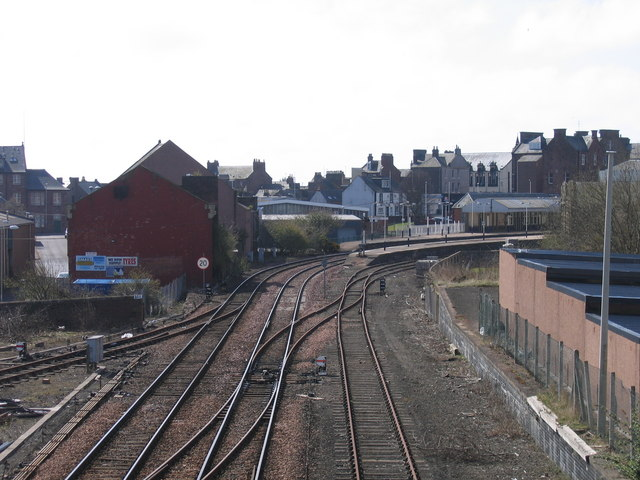
Arbroath, looking south; the new joint station is at top right; the A&FR line to Catherine Street and the docks went straight on

As has been described, both the A&FR and the Dundee and Forfar Railway (D&FR) had powers to build branches to Almericloss, intended as a joint goods depot and exchange point. In fact the A&FR line passed immediately adjacent, but the D&AR line hugged the sea front at Arbroath, and that company failed to build the authorised connecting line.

In 1839 a horse omnibus was provided between the two passenger stations, and some attempt was made to co-ordinate the passenger timetables so as to allow connections. The following year it was agreed to make the connecting line. The D&FR station was at Ladyloan about where Gayfield Park is today. The A&FR had reached the docks from the beginning, and the connection was made by extending the D&FR a short distance eastwards and upgrading the A&FR line. (Note: It is not easy to follow Ferguson on this; on page 30 he says that the line opened in December 1830 "to Arbroath Harbour". On page 41 he says that "The line of track laid between the Dundee & Arbroath's station in Ladyloan and the Arbroath & Forfar's station ran straight up West Grimsby Street, crossing South and North Grimsby and Millgate Street before making a trailing connection with the Arbroath & Forfar's line where that line divided to enter its Catherine Street terminus." This was the alignment of the A&FR harbour line.)

There were no through passenger trains; in fact it is not clear that passenger trains ran on the line; and if they did whether D&AR trains ran to the A&FR station or A&FR trains to the D&AR station. The 1843 Bradshaw shows the two lines running with separate passenger timetables and a note in the D&AR section that "Passengers wishing to proceed, will find a [road] coach waiting to convey them, free of charge, between the Arbroath station of the Forfar railway and the Arbroath station of this railway." There was however a pooling arrangement for goods wagons across the two networks.

=== Financial downturn ===
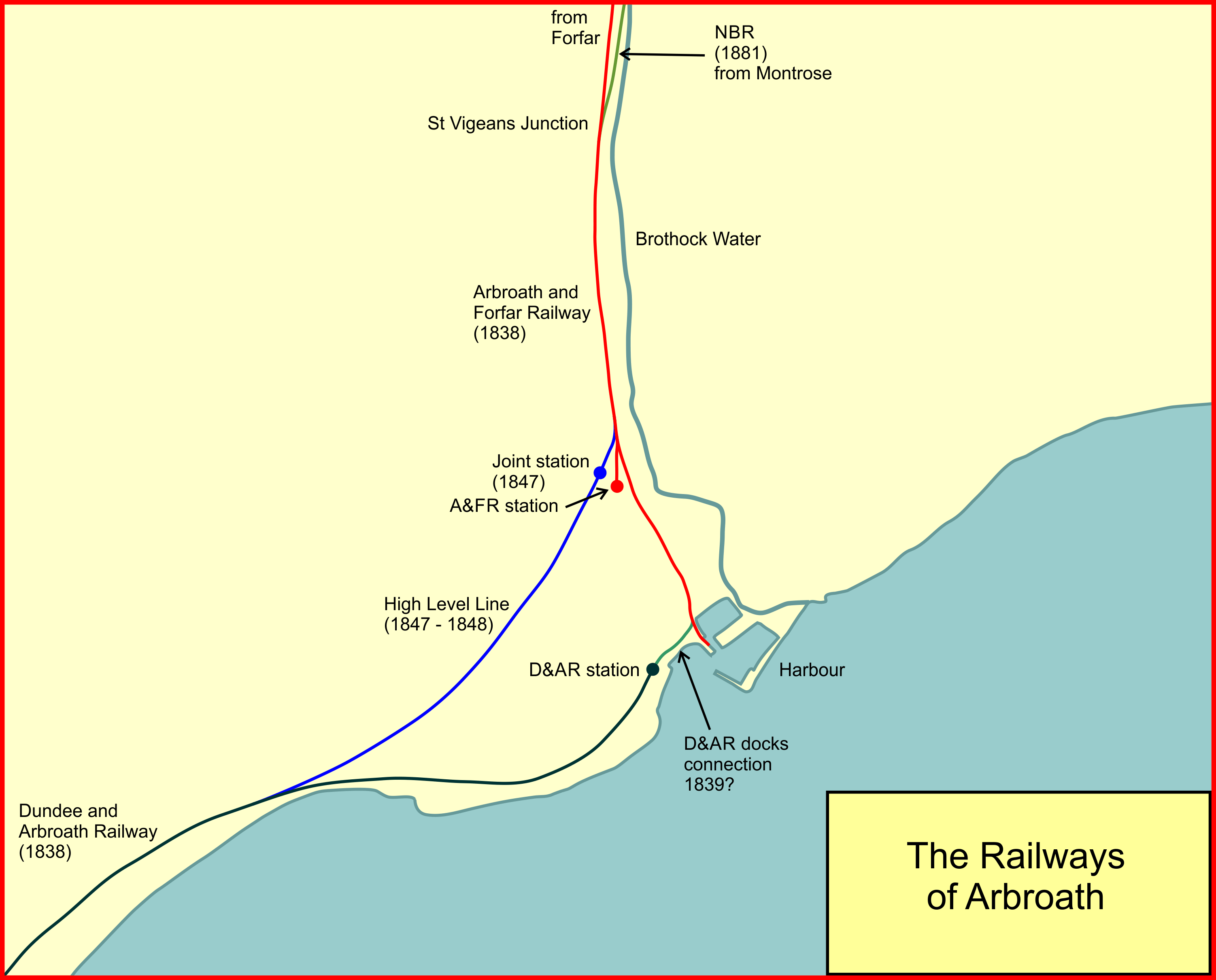
The railways of Arbroath

In the first years of operation, the railway was running at a healthy profit; its financial difficulties were confined to lack of capital. It had resolved that problem by issuing 5% preference shares under the Arbroath and Forfar Railway Act 1840. That money significantly reduced the available money for distribution to ordinary shareholders. Moreover, the original permanent way was not as durable as had been hoped, and significant sums had to be expended on upkeep; in addition the government passenger tax was a heavy burden. In 1842 there was no dividend for ordinary shareholders and there was no money for necessary improvements on the line.

=== Trunk railways ===
The Arbroath and Forfar Railway had been a pioneering local railway. By the 1840s the English railway network was taking shape and a great deal of thought was given to connecting central Scotland with England, and bringing northern towns into the network. Amid considerable controversy, the Caledonian Railway was authorised in 1845 connecting Carlisle with Glasgow and Edinburgh; in the same session, there was a frenzy of railway authorisations, including the Scottish Central Railway, the Scottish Midland Junction Railway and the Aberdeen Railway. Together these lines were to link central Scotland with Stirling, Perth, Forfar and Aberdeen.

In the preparation for the bills for the 1845 parliamentary session, the A&FR was approached in March 1844 by the promoters of the Aberdeen and East Coast of Scotland Railway. (This soon became simply "the Aberdeen Railway".) They wished to build a line from Aberdeen to Friockheim, and run trains from there via Arboath to Dundee over the D&AR. At the same time the promoters of the Scottish Midland Junction Railway (SMJR) were planning to build from Perth to Forfar, creating a through route from the south to Aberdeen partly over the A&FR. In the frenzy of railway schemes at this time, there was now to be a line between Dundee and Perth, and the Aberdeen Railway was considering using that route to Perth. The SMJR seem to have taken offence, and in retaliation declared that they would build their own line from Forfar via Brechin to Laurencekirk. The threat may have been an empty one, but the A&FR realised its own position was not strong.

For some time there was controversy over the Forfar station; the SMJR proposed a line passing it, and joining the A&FR line a mile or so on, facing away from the station. How would through trains call at Forfar? After much discussion the solution was agreed: the SMJR line would provide a Forfar station on its own line.

Only now during the 1845 parliamentary session, did it emerge that the trunk railways would be made to the standard gauge; the A&FR and the D&AR would have to alter their gauge to suit, and moreover to provide double track. The cost of the A&FR part of that work was estimated to be £43,600: money that the A&FR could not hope to raise. The solution was to lease the line to the Aberdeen Railway and allow it to carry out the works. This was agreed and a lease charge of 5.25% on the capital value of the converted A&FR line was agreed; in addition 50% of any operating profit (after payment of the lease charge) would come to the A&FR. The effective date was to be 1 February 1848.

=== Getting the line ready for main line operation ===
On 31 July 1845 several important Scottish lines were authorised; these included both the Aberdeen Railway and the Scottish Midland Junction Railway.

In July 1846 the Dundee and Arbroath Railway commenced to build the "high level" connection between its line and Almericloss, just beyond the A&FR Catherine Street station; there was to be a new joint passenger station near the A&FR station, facing Keptie Street. The route left the original main line west of Rosemount Road and followed the present-day alignment across the north-west flank of the town. The A&FR was not so quick to take action, but work started later laying a new standard gauge line on the north side of the existing single track broad gauge line. The new track would have transverse timber sleepers and wrought iron rails, but the old track was simply to be regauged, not modernised. The Aberdeen Railway objected to that and required the old track to be strengthened in modern materials. This required considerable extra cost, and the A&FR now had to seek yet further additional funds to pay for the work.

In addition the locomotives and rolling stock needed to be converted, or new equipment obtained. A considerable quantity of rolling stock was considered to be unsuitable for conversion and was sold or scrapped. The locomotives Victoria and Caledonia were converted, but three other engines and much rolling stock was sold at auction on 28 December 1848. Britannia and Princess were purchased by a Canadian company, the Montreal and Lachine Railroad, working there and on the St. Lawrence and Atlantic Railroad until 1859.

On 7 July 1847 the first standard gauge trains ran on the A&FR, and work started on converting the gauge of the remaining broad gauge track. The link at Arbroath with the D&AR had been in use for goods trains since 23 December 1847, and passenger trains used the link from 1 February 1848, using a temporary joint station structure at first, and the A&FR station became a goods depot. The Ladyloan D&AR station and the lien approaching it closed immediately. The new permanent joint station opened fully much later, on 14 December 1858. (Note: The Joint Station is referred to as "Arbroath Junction Station" on some Ordnance Survey maps of the period.)

=== The Aberdeen Railway opens ===
The Aberdeen Railway started operation on 1 February 1848; the Arbroath and Forfar line, leased in perpetuity, was simply a branch of the larger concern, which itself was just one link in a chain of railways. For a period the Aberdeen Railway, itself gripped by shortage of capital, was only open as far north as Bridge of Dun. (The Arbroath and Forfar Railway Company continued in existence, receiving and distributing the lease charge, until 1923.)

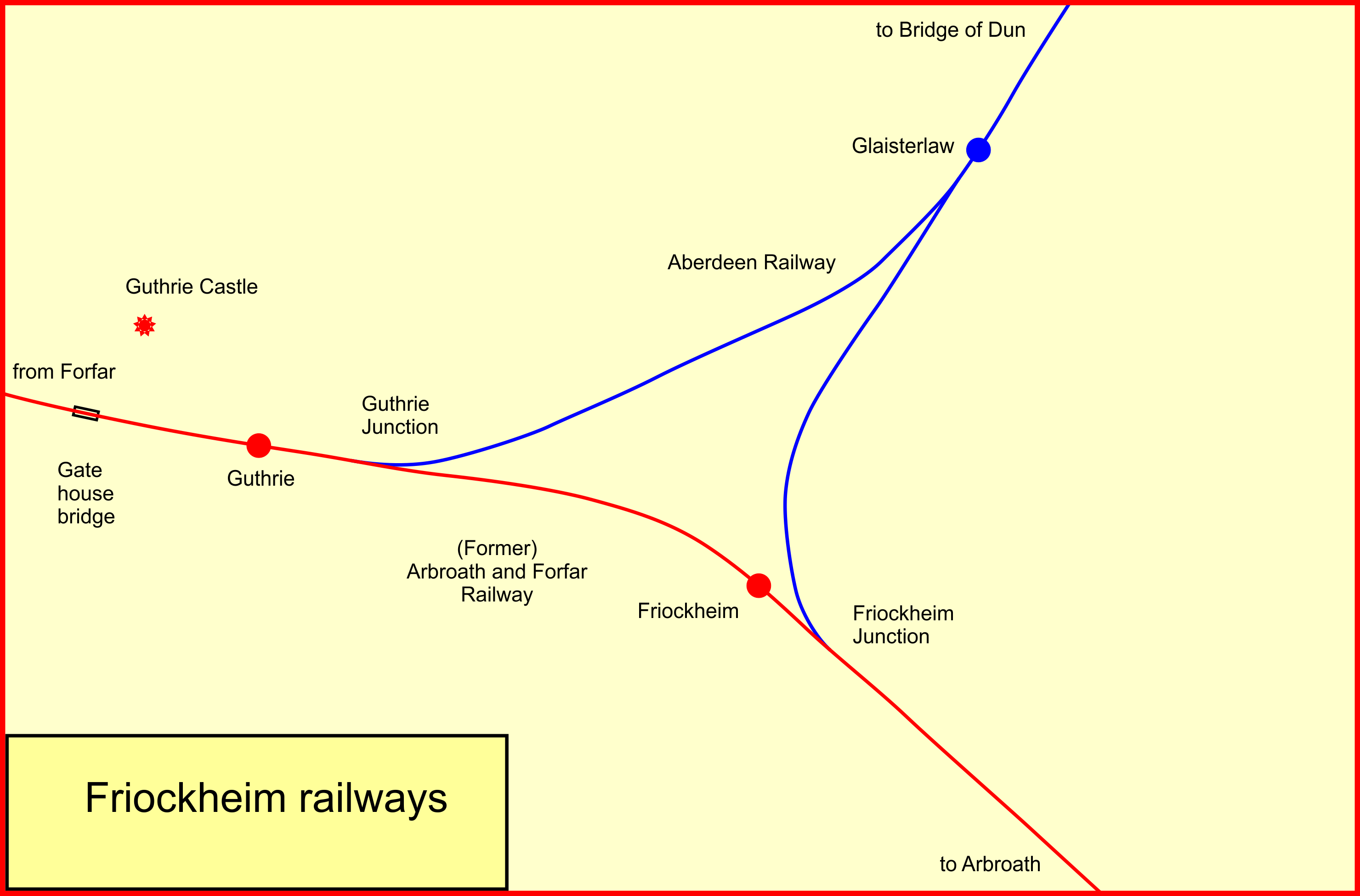
The railways at Friockheim

There was a triangular junction with the A&FR main line; the north apex was at Glasterlaw, with the south (Arbroath) apex at Friockheim; the west apex was at Guthrie. However the Guthrie fork was not properly connected and was not open at first. Friockheim station was not at the apex junction, but a little on the Guthrie side; Aberdeen to Forfar trains therefore passed the junction and reversed to the station to make the call, then continuing on their journey; this practice had been specifically prohibited by the Board of Trade. In fact the majority of the Aberdeen Railway traffic took the Guthrie curve and ran to Perth via Forfar and the SMJR. Much Dundee traffic travelled via Forfar and the Dundee and Newtyle Railway; until October 1849 this still had its own track gauge of 4 ft 6.5in (1,384 mm), so transshipment and change of train were necessary for a few years.

=== The Scottish North Eastern Railway, and after ===
The numerous small railway companies in the area would eventually combine. The Aberdeen Railway operated in a loose arrangement with the SMJR and the Scottish Central Railway (SCR), with a common pool of locomotives and rolling stock, but in 1856 that arrangement came to an end, when the Aberdeen Railway and the Scottish Midland Junction Railway merged to form the Scottish North Eastern Railway (SNER). For the time being the Scottish Central Railway went its own way. The A&FR lease transferred to the SNER. The new company concentrated its traffic from Aberdeen to the south via Forfar, and the line into Arbroath fell into disuse. Its track was lifted in 1857.

However animosity between the SNER and the SCR later resulted in traffic being diverted via Arbroath, requiring reinstatement of the Friockheim line; it was relaid as a single line, opening on 1 April 1863.

The Arbroath and Forfar Railway Act 1836 which authorised the A&FR had specified that the line to Arbroath docks should have gates at the several road level crossings in Arbroath; this had never been done and following several accidents, and the Commissioners of Police requested in May 1856 that the gates be provided. The SNER negotiated with them, and at length it was agreed that gates would be provided at Millgate Street only. Lengthy legalistic prevarication followed, legal opinion indicating among other things that the act had required bridges, and therefore no-one had the right to demand gates at a level crossing. It appears the matter was eventually dropped.

In 1865 and 1866 respectively the SCR and the SNER were further absorbed by the Caledonian Railway, forming a continuous line under single ownership from Carlisle to Aberdeen. The Caledonian control ended the reason for diverting trains away from the Forfar route, and the Friockheim curve was closed again, on 1 November 1867.

Parliament was uncomfortable with the formation of large railway companies, and in granting the amalgamation bill, it gave running powers over much of the northern part of the system to the North British Railway (NBR). The NBR pressed the point further, and obtained authorisation in 1871 to build a line from a junction at St Vigeans, a little north of Arbroath, to Kinnaber Junction via Montrose, giving it access to Aberdeen over the former Aberdeen Railway route. The construction of the Tay Bridge was proceeding in the 1870s, and the NBR applied for joint ownership (with the Caledonian Railway) of the Dundee and Arbroath line; and for running powers over the former A&FR line from the joint Arbroath station to the junction at St Vigeans, and also to the docks at Arbroath over the A&FR harbour line. Furthermore, as the NBR Montrose line would not be ready for some time, the NBR requested running powers over the Friockheim - Glasterlaw spur, which had twice been lifted and reinstated, and again lifted. The spur was ready on 26 July 1876.

In 1870 the SNER opened its Dundee and Forfar direct line. This joined in to the A&FR line east of Forfar, facing towards the station. Goods trains started running on 12 August 1870; approval for opening for passengers was refused at first because of signalling shortcomings, but passenger operation started on 14 November 1870.

In 1879 the portion of the former A&FR (now Caledonian) line between Arbroath and St Vigeans Junction was transferred to the Dundee and Arbroath Joint company, in view of the NBR involvement on the line.

On 28 December 1879 the Tay Bridge fell into the firth, and the NBR now ran goods trains via Perth and Dundee; passengers crossed the Firth by ferry to Broughty Ferry. The NBR opened its line from St Vigeans to Montrose for goods only at first on 1 March 1881.

In 1902 the Friockheim viaduct (on the spur between Friockheim Junction and Glasterlaw) was in need of major reconstruction work; this was carried out over two years at considerable expense to the Caledonian: the major user was the NBR. Nonetheless traffic soon declined; Caledonian Railway trains between Dundee and Aberdeen were discontinued from 1 February 1908 and the spur line closed once again, this time finally.

Between 1907 and 1912 the Arbroath station was reconstructed and modernised.

=== Grouping and nationalisation ===
At the end of 1922 it was intended that all the main line railways of Great Britain would be "grouped" in accordance with the Railways Act 1921. The Caledonian Railway was a constituent of the new London, Midland and Scottish Railway (LMS) with an intended vesting date of 1 January 1923. Technicalities prevented all the legal requirements being finalised by the due date, although for practical purposes the transfer took place.

The Arbroath and Forfar Railway had not operated its line since 1848: it was only a financial company, and it argued that the grouping of managements of the railways need not affect it. This proposal was turned down, and the A&FR shareholders received £146 of LMS 4% stock for every £100 of their own shareholding.

In 1936 the line was singled between Guthrie Junction and Letham Mill,.

The railways were nationalised in 1948; the LMS became part of British Railways.

Following the end of World War II local railway usage declined substantially, and the line between St Vigeans Junction at Arbroath and Guthrie was closed. The former NBR service between Arbroath and Montrose continued, and stub lines to the quarries continued. On 4 September 1967 the through services between Perth and Forfar ceased, and the former NBR route was the sole main line to the north. The former A&FR line closed at the same time. The only residue of the earlier network was the short section from Arbroath station to St Vigeans Junction, operated as part of the remaining Dundee – Arbroath – Montrose route. That remains in use at the present day.

== Locomotives ==
At the beginning there were three locomotives, Victoria, Britannia and Caledonia, all six wheeled tender engines, with 5-foot (1.5 m) driving wheels and 3-foot-6-inch (1.1 m) carrying wheels. They had outside cylinders and inside bearings.

Arbroath and Forfar Railway Locomotives 1838–1848
Ref	Name	Wheel Arrangement	Foundry	Built	Notes
18	Victoria	2-2-2	J Stirling & Co, Dundee	1838	Withdrawn 1849
18	Britannia	2-2-2	J Stirling & Co, Dundee	1839	Sold 1848
18	Caledonia	2-2-2	J Stirling & Co, Dundee	1839	Withdrawn 1849
18	Albert	0-4-2	J Stirling & Co, Dundee	1840	Sold 1848
18	Princess	0-4-2	J Stirling & Co, Dundee	1841	Sold 1848
18	Lucifer	0-4-2	Simpson & Co	1845	SNER No: 53
18	Mercury	0-4-2	Simpson & Co	1846	SNER No: 54
18	Sirocco	0-4-2	Kinmond H & Steel	1847	SNER No: 55
18	Hercules	0-4-2	Kinmond H & Steel	1847	SNER No: 56

== Carriages ==
The carriages were of three types: "Mixed" with a central first-class compartment and second class at each end, "Second" class only and "Third" class only. The first class compartments were glazed, while the second class were provided with curtains. The third class were without roofs but had seats.

== Current operations ==
Apart for the section between Arbroath (new) and St Vigean's Junction operated by Network Rail, with passenger services primarily operated by ScotRail as the Edinburgh to Aberdeen Line, the railway is closed.

== Topography ==
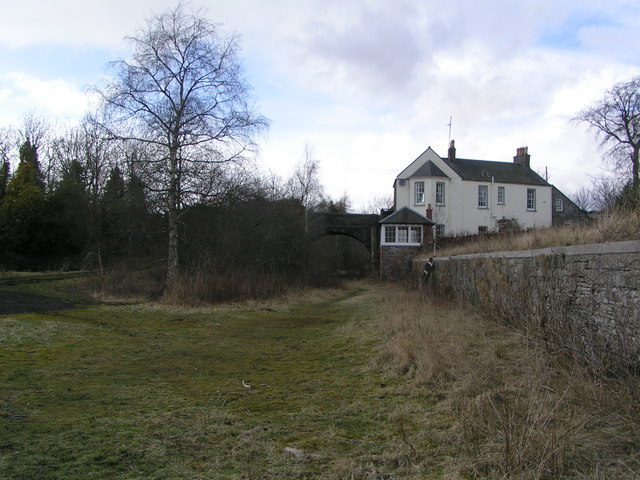
Auldbar Stationmaster's House

* Forfar; initially described as Forfar Play Field; opened 4 December 1838; replaced by Scottish Midland Junction station (on SMJR line) on 2 August 1848;

- Forfar Junction; convergence of SMJR line from Perth; divergence of Dundee direct line;
- Clocksbriggs; opened 4 December 1838; closed 1 January 1917; reopened 2 June 1919; closed 5 December 1955;
- Auldbar Road; opened 4 December 1838; closed 11 June 1956;
- Guthrie; opened 4 December 1838; closed 5 December 1955; shown as "Guthrie Junction station" on some Ordnance Survey maps;
- Guthrie Junction; divergence of Aberdeen Railway route to Glasterlaw and Bridge of Dun;
- Friockheim; opened 4 December 1838; closed 5 December 1955;
- Friockheim Junction; convergence of Aberdeen Railway route from Glasterlaw;
- Border Quarry; private siding connection;
- Leysmill; opened 24 November 1838; closed 5 December 1955;
- Colliston; opened 24 November 1838; closed 5 December 1955;
- Letham Quarry; private siding connection;
- St Vigeans Junction; convergence of former North British Railway line from Montrose;
- Arbroath North; divergence of line to Arbroath (Joint) station and Dundee;
- Arbroath Catherine Street; horse drawn passenger trains stopped here from 24 November 1838; formal station established 3 January 1839. closed 1848 when trains diverted to Arbroath (Joint)

== Connections to other lines ==
- Scottish Midland Junction Railway at Forfar North Junction
- Dundee and Forfar Direct Line at Forfar East Junction
- Aberdeen Railway at Friockheim Junction and Guthrie Junction
- North British, Arbroath and Montrose Railway at St Vigean's Junction north east of Arbroath
- Dundee and Arbroath Railway close to Arbroath (new) and Arbroath (Catherine Street)
