= Leysmill railway station =

Disused railway station in Leysmill, Angus

Coordinates: 56.6194°N 2.6428°W

Leysmill
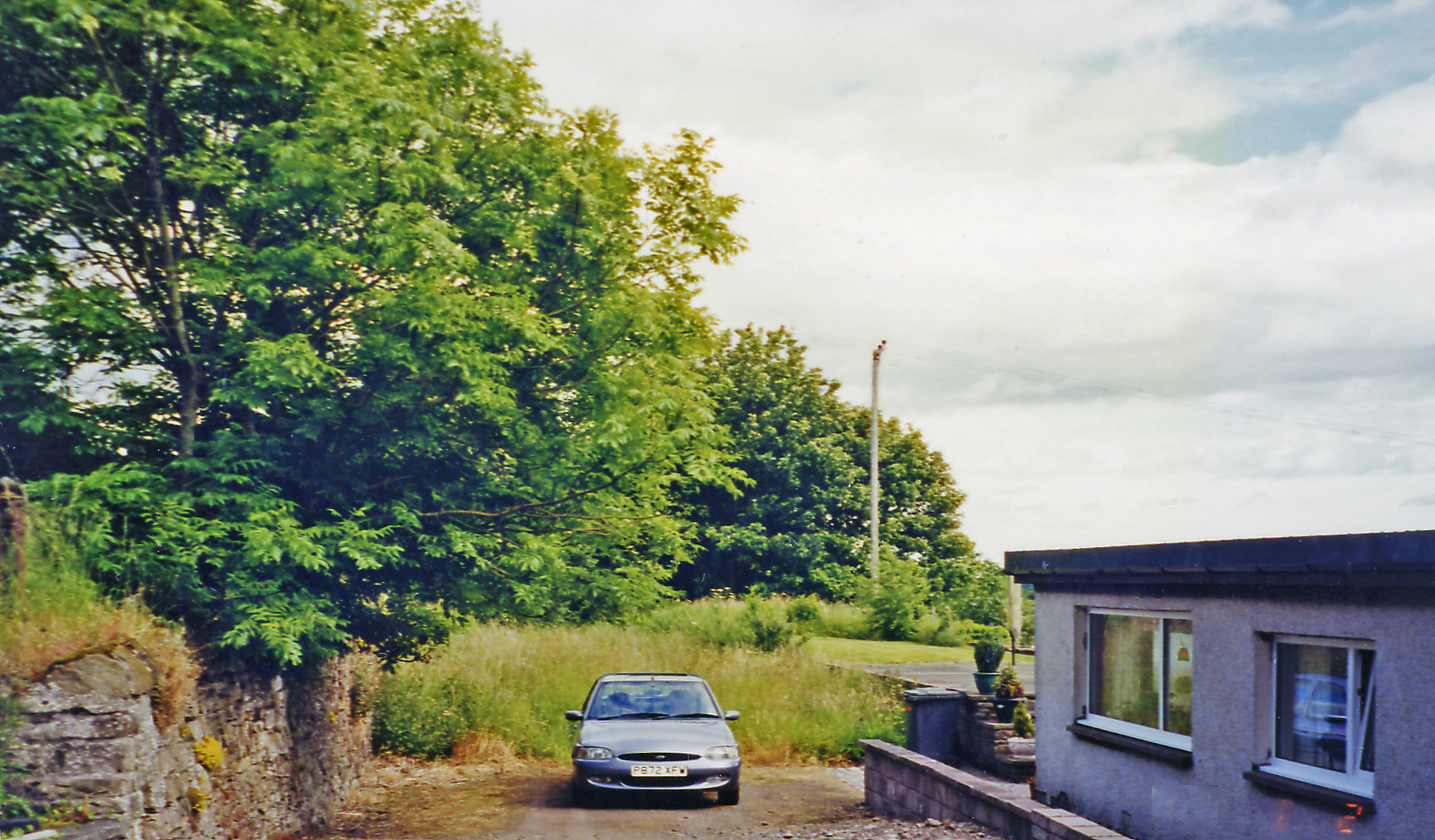
- The site of the station in 2002

General information
- Location: Leysmill, Angus; Scotland
- Platforms: 2

Other information
- Status: Disused

History
- Original company: Aberdeen Railway
- Pre-grouping: Aberdeen Railway; Caledonian Railway
- Post-grouping: London, Midland and Scottish Railway

Key dates
- 24 November 1838: Opened
- 5 December 1955: Closed
Location

Leysmill railway station served the village of Leysmill, Angus, Scotland from 1838 to 1955 on the Arbroath and Forfar Railway.

== History ==
The station opened on 24 November 1838 by the Aberdeen Railway. It closed to both passengers and goods traffic on 5 December 1955.

Preceding station	Disused railways	Following station
Colliston; Line and station closed	Arbroath and Forfar Railway	Glasterlaw; Line and station closed
