= Armour-Bearer and Squire of His Majesty's Body =

The Armour-Bearer was one of the Great Offices of the Royal Household in Scotland.

James IV granted the office of Armour-Bearer and Squire of His Majesty's Body to Sir Alexander Seton of Tullibody. This grant, apparently dating from 1488, was renewed by Charles II in 1651 to Sir Alexander's descendant, James Seton of Touch. A claim was made for the coronation of King Edward VII and Queen Alexandra, but the Court of Claims adjudged that no order be made.

It appeared, however, that the holder had been summoned to perform the office in 1876 during the state visit to Scotland of Queen Victoria and he was in attendance for the visit of King George V in 1911.

It is likely that the last holder was Sir Douglas Seton-Steuart, 5th Baronet who died in 1930 with no heirs.

== Sources ==
- The Laws of Scotland. Stair Memorial Encyclopaedia, Vol 7 The Crown, para 824
