= Guthrie Castle =

Castle in Angus, Scotland

Coordinates: 56°38′38″N 2°42′56″W

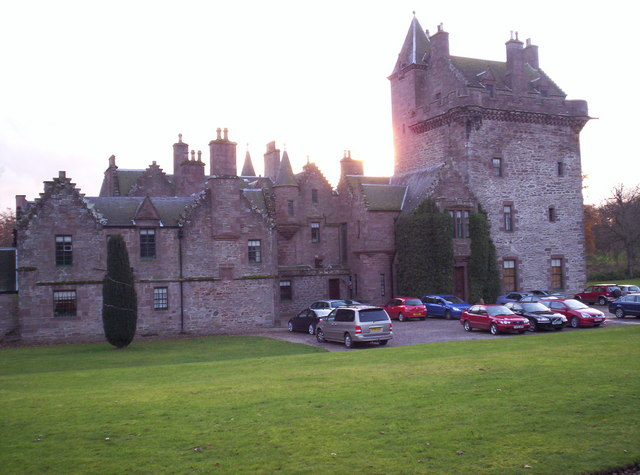
- The castle in 2006
- Interactive map of Guthrie Castle

Inventory of Gardens and Designed Landscapes in Scotland
- Official name: Guthrie Castle
- Designated: 30 June 1987
- Reference no.: GDL00205

Guthrie Castle is a castle and country house in Angus, Scotland. It is located in the village of Guthrie, 10 kilometres (6.2 mi) east of Forfar, and 29 kilometres (18 mi) north-east of Dundee. The castle dates back to the 15th century, although much of the present building is of 19th-century origin. It is now a private house.

== History ==
Guthrie Castle comprises a tower house, originally built by Sir David Guthrie (1435–1500), Treasurer and Lord Justice-General of Scotland, in 1468. The Guthrie family later built a house beside the tower. In 1848, the two were linked by a baronial style expansion, to designs by David Bryce. The historic keep remained in the Guthrie family until 1983, with the death of Colonel Ivan Guthrie.

== Restoration ==
In 1984, Guthrie Castle was purchased by Daniel S. Peña, Sr., an American businessman. Peña restored the castle to its 19th-century condition, and built a golf course within the estate in 1994/95. In 2003, the castle and its grounds were opened to the public, for wedding parties, corporate functions and for group bookings. In 2017, after a fraud investigation, the owners decided that it will no longer be open to the public and will remain a private house.
