= Guthrie, Angus =

Coordinates: 56.644302°N 2.707656°W

Guthrie
- Location within Angus
- OS grid reference: NO567505
- Council area: Angus
- Lieutenancy area: Angus
- Country: Scotland
- Sovereign state: United Kingdom
- Post town: FORFAR
- Postcode district: DD8
- Dialling code: 01241
- Police: Scotland
- Fire: Scottish
- Ambulance: Scottish
- UK Parliament: Angus
- Scottish Parliament: Angus South

Guthrie is a village in Angus, Scotland, roughly at the centre point of the towns of Arbroath, Brechin and Forfar. The principal building in the village is Guthrie Castle. The village of Guthrie is centered on the Guthrie parish church, containing the Guthrie Aisle, built in 1450. The parish was united with Carbuddo (named after Buíte of Monasterboice) in the sixteenth century.

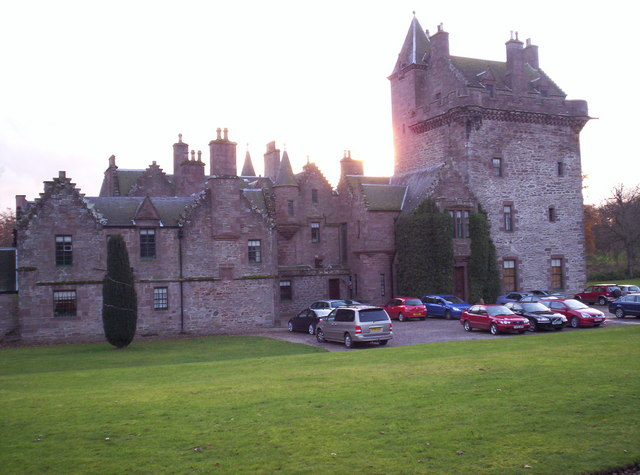
Guthrie Castle
