= Guthrie (surname) =

Guthrie is an English-language surname with several independent origins. In some cases the surname is derived from a place in Scotland, located near Forfar, Guthrie, Angus, which is derived from the Gaelic gaothair, meaning "windy place". Another origin of the name is from the Scottish Gaelic MagUchtre, meaning "son of Uchtre". The personal name Uchtre is of uncertain origin. Another origin of the surname Guthrie is as an Anglicisation of the Irish Ó Fhlaithimh, meaning "descendant of Flaitheamh".

== People with the surname Guthrie ==
- A. B. Guthrie Jr. (1901–1991), American author
- A. Derek Guthrie (1935–2025), Canadian judge
- Abigail Guthrie, New Zealand tennis player
- Alexander Guthrie (1796–1865), Scottish merchant
- Allan Guthrie (born 1965), Scottish author
- Andrew Guthrie (born 1961), Australian rules footballer
- Arlo Guthrie (born 1947), American folk singer
- Bernie Guthrie (1911–1982), Australian rules footballer
- Bessie Guthrie (1905–1977), Australian activist
- Brett Guthrie (born 1964), American politician
- Brian Guthrie, American politician
- Bruce Guthrie, Australian journalist
- Byron Guthrie (1935–2025), Australian rules footballer
- Cam Guthrie (born 1975), Canadian politician
- Cameron Guthrie (born 1992), Australian rules footballer
- Carl E. Guthrie (1905–1967), American cinematographer
- Charles Guthrie (disambiguation), multiple people, including:
  - Charles Guthrie, Baron Guthrie of Craigiebank (1938–2025), British army officer
  - Charles Guthrie (athletic director), American athletic director
  - Charles Claude Guthrie (1880–1963), American physiologist
  - Charles John Guthrie, Lord Guthrie (1849–1920), Scottish lawyer and judge
- Chris Guthrie (born 1953), English footballer
- Chris Guthrie (law school dean) (born 1967), American legal scholar
- Christine Guthrie (1945–2022), American geneticist
- Connop Guthrie (1882–1945), British businessman
- Dalton Guthrie (born 1995), American baseball player
- Danny Guthrie (born 1987), English footballer
- David Guthrie (disambiguation), multiple people, including:
  - David Guthrie (British politician) (1861–1918), British politician
  - David Guthrie (lord treasurer) (fl. 1479), Scottish civil servant
  - David Guthrie (New Zealand politician) (1856–1927), New Zealand politician
- Donald Guthrie (disambiguation), multiple people, including:
  - Donald Guthrie (physician) (1880–1958), American surgeon
  - Donald Guthrie (politician) (1840–1915), Canadian politician
  - Donald Guthrie (theologian) (1916–1992), British biblical scholar
- Doug Guthrie, American sociologist
- Douglas Guthrie (1885–1975), Scottish medical doctor and historian
- Edwin Ray Guthrie (1886–1959), American psychologist
- Eric Guthrie (born 1947), Canadian football player
- Floyd Guthrie (born 1966), Costa Rican-Guatemalan footballer
- Francis Guthrie (1831–1899), South African mathematician
- Frank Guthrie (disambiguation), multiple people, including:
  - Frank Guthrie (politician) (1893–1955), Australian politician
  - Frank Guthrie (rugby union) (1869–1954), English-born South African rugby union player
- Frederick Guthrie (disambiguation), multiple people, including:
  - Frederick Guthrie (bass) (1924–2008), American operatic bass
  - Frederick Guthrie (scientist) (1833–1886), British physicist and chemist
  - Frederick Bickell Guthrie (1861–1927), Australian chemist
- George Guthrie (disambiguation), multiple people, including:
  - George Guthrie (hurdler) (1904–1972), American hurdler
  - George Guthrie (songwriter) (born 1842), British songwriter
  - George H. Guthrie (born 1959), American biblical scholar
  - George James Guthrie (1785–1856), English surgeon
  - George W. Guthrie (1848–1917), American politician and diplomat
- Giles Guthrie (1916–1979), English aviator and businessman
- Grant Guthrie (born 1948), American football player
- Gwen Guthrie (1950–1999), American musician
- Helen Guthrie (fl. 1592), Scottish petitioner
- Helen Guthrie (accused witch) (died c. 1662), Scottish woman executed for witchcraft
- Henry Guthrie (c. 1600–1676), Scottish historian and cleric
- Herbert Guthrie (1902–1951), Australian rules footballer and cricketer
- Hugh Guthrie (1866–1939), Canadian lawyer and politician
- Hugh Guthrie (Australian politician) (1910–2000), Australian politician
- Hugh Guthrie (Scottish politician) (1879–1946), Scottish politician
- J. Hunter Guthrie (1901–1974), American philosopher and priest
- Jack Guthrie (1915–1948), American songwriter and performer
- James Guthrie (disambiguation), multiple people, including:
  - James Guthrie (artist) (1859–1930), Scottish painter
  - James Guthrie (Australian politician) (1872–1958), Australian politician
  - James Guthrie (conductor) (1914–1996), American music director and newspaper publisher
  - James Guthrie (Kentucky politician) (1792–1869), American politician
  - James Guthrie (minister) (c. 1612–1661), Scottish preacher and martyr
  - James Guthrie (music producer) (born 1953), English record producer
- Janet Guthrie (born 1938), American racing driver
- Jennifer Guthrie, American actress
- Jeremy Guthrie (born 1979), American baseball player
- Jim Guthrie (politician) (born 1955), American politician
- Jim Guthrie (racing driver) (born 1961), American racing driver
- Jim Guthrie (singer-songwriter), Canadian singer-songwriter
- Jimmie Guthrie (1897–1937), Scottish motorcycle racer
- Jimmy Guthrie (footballer) (1912–1981), Scottish footballer
- Joan Lavender Bailie Guthrie (1889–1914), British suffragette
- John Guthrie (disambiguation), multiple people, including:
  - John Guthrie (bishop of Moray) (died 1649), Scottish prelate
  - John Guthrie (bishop of Ross) (fl. 1492), Scottish prelate
  - John Guthrie (cricketer) (1795–1865), English cricketer
  - John Guthrie (novelist) (1905–1955), New Zealand journalist and novelist
  - John Guthrie (politician), British politician
  - John B. Guthrie (1807–1885), American politician
  - John R. Guthrie (1921–2009), American army officer
  - John T. Guthrie, American education scientist
- Jon Guthrie (born 1992), English footballer
- Joseph Guthrie (politician) (born 1929), American politician
- Julian Guthrie, American journalist and author
- Karen Guthrie (born 1970), British artist
- Kathleen Guthrie (1905–1981), British artist
- Keith Guthrie (disambiguation), multiple people, including:
  - Keith Guthrie (American football), American football player
  - Keith Guthrie (diplomat) (1936–2010), American diplomat
- Kenneth Sylvan Guthrie (1871–1940), Scottish-born American philosopher and writer
- Kevin Guthrie (born 1988), Scottish actor
- Kurtis Guthrie (born 1993), English footballer
- Leonard Guthrie (1858–1918), British paediatrician
- Leonard Rome Guthrie (1880–1958), Scottish architect
- Liam Guthrie (born 1997), Australian cricketer
- Lizzie M. Guthrie (1838–1880), American missionary
- Louise Guthrie (1879–1966), South African botanist and artist
- Luke Guthrie (born 1990), American golfer
- Malcolm Guthrie (1903–1972), English linguist
- Marc Guthrie (born 1952), American politician
- Marjorie Guthrie (1917–1983), American dancer
- Mark Guthrie (born 1965), American baseball player
- Martha Guthrie (1894–1941), American tennis player
- Matthew Guthrie (1743–1807), Scottish physician and traveller
- Mary Jane Guthrie (1895–1975), American zoologist and cancer researcher
- Michelle Guthrie (born 1965), Australian television executive
- Murray Kenneth Guthrie (1896–1985), United States military pilot
- Nancy Guthrie (born 1942), American kidnapping victim
- Nancy Peoples Guthrie (born 1952), American politician
- Niall Guthrie (born 1988), New Zealand rugby league player
- Nora Guthrie (born 1950), American record producer
- Peter Guthrie (disambiguation), multiple people, including:
  - Peter Guthrie (footballer) (born 1961), English footballer
  - Peter Guthrie (politician) (born 1968/1969), Canadian politician
- Priscilla Guthrie, American government official
- Ralph Guthrie (1932–1996), English footballer
- Ramon Guthrie (1896–1973), American-French poet and novelist
- Randolph H. Guthrie (1905–1989), American businessman
- Rivers Guthrie (born 1972), American soccer player
- Robert Guthrie (disambiguation), multiple people, including:
  - Robert Guthrie (microbiologist) (1916–1995), American microbiologist
  - Robert Guthrie (politician) (1857–1921), Scottish-born Australian politician
  - Robert V. Guthrie (1932–2005), American psychologist
- Robin Guthrie (born 1962), Scottish musician
- Robin Guthrie (artist) (1902–1971), British painter and illustrator
- Robin Guthrie (charity administrator) (1937–2009), British charity administrator
- Rodney M. Guthrie, (1908–1991), American judge
- Ron Guthrie (born 1944), English footballer
- Rufus Guthrie (c. 1942–2000), American football player
- Rutherford Guthrie (1899–1990), Australian politician
- Samuel Guthrie (disambiguation), multiple people, including:
  - Samuel Guthrie (physician) (1782–1848), American medical doctor and discoverer of chloroform
  - Samuel Guthrie (politician) (1885–1960), Scottish-born Canadian politician
- Sarah Lee Guthrie (born 1979), American folk singer
- Savannah Guthrie (born 1971), American television journalist
- Scott Guthrie (born 1975), American computer programmer
- Scott Guthrie (politician) (born 1957), American politician
- Sean Guthrie (born 1988), American racing driver
- Serena Guthrie (born 1990), Jerseywoman netball player
- Shane Guthrie (born 1984), Irish footballer
- Shea Guthrie (born 1987), Canadian ice hockey player
- Shirley Guthrie (1927–2004), American theologian
- Stephen Guthrie, New Zealand wheelchair rugby player
- Stewart Guthrie (1948–1990), New Zealand police officer
- Thomas Guthrie (disambiguation), multiple people, including:
  - Thomas Guthrie (1803–1873), Scottish philanthropist
  - Thomas Guthrie (director), English operatic director and baritone
  - Thomas Anstey Guthrie (1856–1934), English novelist
  - Thomas Maule Guthrie (1870–1943), Scottish politician
- Tim Guthrie (born 1965), American artist and filmmaker
- Trevor Guthrie (born 1973), Canadian musician
- Tyrone Guthrie (1900–1971), English stage director and playwright
- Vanessa Guthrie (born 1961), Australian businesswoman
- Vee Guthrie (1920–2012), American illustrator
- W. K. C. Guthrie (1906–1981), Scottish classical scholar
- Walter Guthrie (1869–1911), British politician
- William Guthrie (disambiguation), multiple people, including:
  - William Guthrie (boxer) (born 1967), American pugilist
  - William Guthrie (historian) (1708–1770), Scottish writer and historian
  - William Guthrie (minister) (1620–1665), Scottish minister and author
  - William Guthrie (politician) (1884–1954), Canadian politician
  - William A. Guthrie (1846–1916), American lawyer and politician
  - William Dameron Guthrie (1859–1935), American lawyer
  - William Norman Guthrie (1868–1944), American clergyman
- Woody Guthrie (1912–1967), American folk singer
- Zach Guthrie (born 1998), Australian rules footballer
- Zach Guthrie (basketball), American basketball coach
- Lily Guthrie (born 2004), American scholar

== Fictional characters ==
- Jay Guthrie, Marvel Comics character also known as Icarus
- K.C. Guthrie, a character in the Canadian TV series Degrassi: The Next Generation
- Melody Guthrie, Marvel Comics character
- Paige Guthrie, Marvel Comics character also known as Husk
- Sam Guthrie, Marvel Comics character also known as Cannonball

== Compound surnames ==
These people have Guthrie as part of a compound surname:

- Clara Guthrie d'Arcis (1879–1937), American-born Swiss activist
- Gail Guthrie Valaskakis (1939–2007), American-born Canadian Indigenous scholar
- Christian Guthrie Wright (1844–1907), Scottish activist and writer
- Diane Guthrie-Gresham (born 1971), Jamaican track and field athlete
- Herbert Guthrie-Smith (1860–1940), New Zealand conservationist and author

== Groups named Guthrie ==
- Clan Guthrie

== See also ==
- Guthrie (disambiguation)
- Lord Guthrie
- Senator Guthrie
- Chris McGuthrie (born 1974), American basketball player
