= Frederick Guthrie =

Frederick Guthrie may refer to:

- Frederick Guthrie (scientist) (1833–1886), British physicist, chemist, and academic
- Frederick Guthrie (bass) (1924–2008), American operatic bass
- Frederick Bickell Guthrie (1861–1927), Australian agricultural chemist and a president of the Royal Society of New South Wales.
- Frederick Guthrie Tait (1861–1927), Scottish golfer and soldier
