= Hilde Rössel-Majdan =

Austrian contralto

- Born: Hildegard Figl; 30 January 1921; Moosbierbaum, Austria
- Died: 15 December 2010 (aged 89); Vienna, Austria
- Education: University of Music and Performing Arts, Vienna
- Occupation: Operatic contralto
- Organizations: Vienna State Opera; Musikhochschule Graz
- Spouse: Karl Rössel-Majdan

External audio
- You may hear Hilde Rossel-Majdan performing Wolfgang Amadeus Mozart's Requiem Mass in D minor K. 626 with Herbert von Karajan conducting the Vienna Philharmonic Orchestra and Fritz Wunderlich, Eberhhard Wachter, Leontyne Price, Walter Berry in 1960 Here on archive.org

Hilde Rössel-Majdan (30 January 1921 – 15 December 2010) was an Austrian contralto in opera and concert. She was a member of the Vienna State Opera and is known for early recordings of Bach's music including his cantatas. She was an influential voice teacher in Graz and Vienna.

== Career ==
She was born Hildegard Figl in Moosbierbaum. She attended a business school in the Josefstadt of Vienna and performed then already as a soloist in church services and church concerts. She studied voice at the University of Music and Performing Arts, Vienna, from 1945 to 1949, with her father-in-law, Karl Rössel-Majdan (1885–1948), and Helene Wildbrunn. Her deep contralto voice had a unique timbre particularly suited for Baroque music. She substituted in 1947 in Bach's St Matthew Passion, conducted by Wilhelm Furtwängler.

She made her operatic debut on 18 September 1951 as the voice of Antonia's mother in Les Contes d'Hoffmann at the Theater an der Wien. In 1951 she was engaged at the Vienna State Opera, and was a member of the ensemble from 1955 to 1976. She appeared at the State Opera in 62 parts, in a total of 1,553 performances, singing the role of Mercedes in Carmen 65 times, Marcellina in Le nozze di Figaro 194 times, and Annina in Der Rosenkavalier 172 times. Her last appearance onstage was 22 November 1976 in Schoenberg's Moses und Aron.

Rössel-Majdan also appeared at La Scala and Covent Garden, among others. At the Salzburg Festival, she performed the roles of Dryad in Ariadne auf Naxos in 1954, Lucrezia in Palestrina in 1958 and Annina and Marcellina in 1960.

She was invited to the Edinburgh Festival and the Aix-en-Provence Festival. On 20 September 1962 she was awarded the title Kammersängerin. In 1982 she was awarded the Austrian Cross of Honour for Science and Art, 1st class (Österreichisches Ehrenkreuz für Wissenschaft und Kunst I. Klasse).

From 1966 she taught at the Musikhochschule in Graz, where she was appointed professor of Lieder and oratorio singing in 1970. From 1972 until her retirement in 1991, she taught at the University of Music and Performing Arts, Vienna, appointed professor of Sologesang (solo singing) in 1976. Among her students were Wolfgang Holzmair and Alexander Kaimbacher.

== Marriage ==
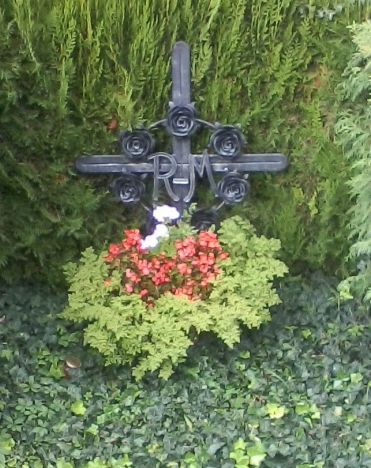
Feuerhalle Simmering, grave of Karl and Hilde Rössel-Majdan

She was married in 1945 to Karl Rössel-Majdan (1916–2000).

== Death ==
Hilde Rössel-Majdan died in Vienna. She was cremated at Feuerhalle Simmering, where also her ashes are buried.

== Recordings ==
Hilde Rössel-Majdan recorded opera, especially works by Richard Strauss (Der Rosenkavalier, Die Frau ohne Schatten, Ariadne auf Naxos) and Mozart (Le nozze di figaro, Die Zauberflöte).

Starting in the early 1950s, she recorded works by Bach, including his Magnificat, conducted by Felix Prohaska, with Mimi Coertse, Anton Dermota, Frederick Guthrie. Hermann Scherchen, who was known for contemporary music, conducted Bach's solo cantatas Schlage doch, gewünschte Stunde, BWV 53, and Widerstehe doch der Sünde, BWV 54, and in 1953 the St Matthew Passion, with the Wiener Akademie-Kammerchor, the Orchestra of the Vienna State Opera, Hugues Cuénod (Evangelist), Heinz Rehfuss (vox Christi), Magda László, Petre Munteanu and Richard Standen, and the young Kurt Equiluz as the second witness. She also recorded the Passion with Mogens Wöldike, with Uno Ebrelius as the Evangelist, Hans Braun (vox Christi), Teresa Stich-Randall, Waldemar Kmentt and Walter Berry. She recorded three Bach cantatas with Michael Gielen, two others with Prohaska, six with Scherchen and two with Wöldike.

She appeared in a concert of the ORF on 8 April 1968 with the Stabat mater by Karol Szymanowski and that by Tommaso Traetta, conducted by Dietfried Bernet, with Mimi Coertse and Ladislaus Anderko.

== Literature ==
- Oesterreichisches Musiklexikon (Music Encyclopedia of Austria), vol. 4, p. 1956, edition of the Austrian Academy of Sciences, Vienna 2005, ISBN 3-7001-3046-5
