= George Guthrie =

George Guthrie may refer to:

- George H. Guthrie (born 1959), professor at Union University
- George James Guthrie (1785–1856), English surgeon
- George W. Guthrie (1848–1917), mayor
- George Guthrie (hurdler) (1904–1972), American track and field athlete
- George Guthrie (songwriter) (1842–?), Newcastle upon Tyne songwriter

== See also ==
- Guthrie (surname)
- Guthrie (disambiguation)
