= Keith Guthrie =

Keith Guthrie may refer to:

- W. K. C. Guthrie (1906–1981), Scottish classical scholar
- Keith Guthrie (diplomat) (1936–2010), American diplomat
- Keith Guthrie (American football) (born 1961), American football defensive tackle
