= William Guthrie =

William Guthrie may refer to:

- William Guthrie (boxer) (born 1967), American boxer
- William Guthrie (historian) (1708–1770), Scottish writer and journalist
- William Guthrie (politician) (1884–1954), Canadian politician
- William Guthrie (minister) (1620–1665), Scottish Presbyterian minister and author
- William A. Guthrie (1846–1916), American lawyer and politician
- William Dameron Guthrie (1859–1935), American lawyer
- W. K. C. Guthrie (William Keith Chambers Guthrie, 1906–1981), Scottish classical scholar and philosophy professor
- William Norman Guthrie (1868–1944), American clergyman
- William Tyrone Guthrie (1900–1971), English theatre director
