= John Guthrie =

John Guthrie may refer to:

- John Guthrie (bishop of Ross) (died c. 1494), Scottish Roman Catholic bishop
- John Guthrie (bishop of Moray) (died 1649), Church of Scotland bishop
- John Guthrie (cricketer) (1795–1865), English cricketer
- John Guthrie (novelist) (1905–1955), author from New Zealand
- John Guthrie (politician), British political activist
- John B. Guthrie (1807–1885), mayor of Pittsburgh, Pennsylvania
- John R. Guthrie (1921–2009), U.S. Army general
- John T. Guthrie, American education and literacy researcher
- John Guthrie (basketball coach), former head basketball coach of the Georgia Bulldogs

== See also ==
- Jack Guthrie (1915–1948), musician
- Jon Guthrie (born 1992), English footballer
