= James Guthrie =

James Guthrie may refer to:

== Entertainment ==
- James Guthrie (artist) (1859–1930), Scottish painter
- James Guthrie (conductor) (1914–1996), American conductor and newspaper executive
- James Guthrie (music producer) (born 1953), English recording engineer and record producer
- Jim Guthrie (singer-songwriter), Canadian singer-songwriter

== Politics ==
- James Guthrie (Australian politician) (1872–1958), Australian Senator
- James Guthrie (Kentucky politician) (1792–1869), railroad president, Secretary of the Treasury under President Franklin Pierce
- Jim Guthrie (politician) (born 1955), Idaho State Representative

== Sports ==
- Jimmy Guthrie (footballer) (1912–1981), Scottish footballer
- Jimmie Guthrie (1897–1937), motorcycle racer
- Jim Guthrie (racing driver) (born 1961), race car driver

== Other people ==
- James Guthrie (minister) (1612–1661), Scottish Presbyterian martyr, executed at the Restoration

== See also ==
- Guthrie (disambiguation)
