= Samuel Guthrie =

Samuel Guthrie may refer to:

- Samuel Guthrie (politician) (1885–1960), Scottish-born Canadian politician and member of the Legislative Assembly of British Columbia
- Samuel Guthrie (physician) (1782–1848), American physician who discovered chloroform
- Samuel Guthrie, alias Cannonball, Marvel Comics character who is a member of the New Mutants, X-Men, and Avengers
