= Coachella Valley Lakers =

American professional basketball team of the NBA G League

- 2025–26 NBA G League season
- Conference: Western
- League: NBA G League
- Founded: 2006
- History: Los Angeles D-Fenders; 2006–2017; South Bay Lakers; 2017–2026; Coachella Valley Lakers; 2026–present
- Arena: Acrisure Arena
- Location: Thousand Palms, California
- Team colors: Purple, gold, light purple, black
- Team manager: Nick Mazzella
- Head coach: Alex Cerda
- Ownership: Los Angeles Lakers
- Affiliation: Los Angeles Lakers
- Championships: 0
- Conference titles: 2 (2012, 2016)
- Division titles: 2 (2012, 2014)
- Website: coachellavalley.gleague.nba.com

The Coachella Valley Lakers are an American professional basketball team in the NBA G League based in Thousand Palms, California. Founded in 2006 as the Los Angeles D-Fenders, the team is owned by the Los Angeles Lakers, who were the first National Basketball Association (NBA) franchise to own a D-League team. The team was renamed to the South Bay Lakers for its metro region after the 2016–17 D-League season, when it moved home games from the Toyota Sports Center in El Segundo to the nearby UCLA Health Training Center, a new practice facility for the Los Angeles Lakers. After the 2025–26 NBA G League season, the team was relocated to Coachella Valley and renamed the Coachella Valley Lakers. Their home games were moved to the Acrisure Arena in Thousand Palms.

All games are broadcast in streaming audio from the team's website and on the NBA's Futurecast web channel. On December 21, 2012, the D-Fenders announced a telecast agreement with TWC SportsNet Channel (now Spectrum SportsNet).

== History ==
The original Los Angeles D-Fenders logo, used from 2006 to 2017

=== The Dan Panaggio era (2006–2009) ===
The team's name was chosen in a "name the team" contest with a format similar to a March Madness NCAA tournament bracket with 64 candidates. Voting took place from April to June 5, 2006, when "Breakers" emerged as the winner and "D-Fenders" the runner-up. After the Lakers organization learned that a local coed dwarf basketball team already used the winning name, they announced the team as the D-Fenders and unveiled its logo on July 26, 2006.

In their debut season (2006–07) the D-Fenders competed in the Western Division and finished with a 23–27 record. Despite a sub-500 record the D-Fenders almost qualified for the playoffs. Dan Panaggio, formerly the assistant head coach of the Portland Trail Blazers, served as head coach. Brian Chase received an All D-League Honorable Mention and was selected for the D-League All-Star Game. Stephane Lasme received the D-Fenders first ever "call up" to the NBA's Miami Heat.

D-Fender games were played as "doubleheaders" with their parent club, the Los Angeles Lakers (either prior to or following Laker games). Admission tickets to Lakers games also admitted one to the D-Fender game. On April 1, 2007, Jordan Farmar became the first player in history to play in an NBA game and a D-League game in the same day.

In the 2007–08 season, Panaggio returned as head coach, and the D-Fenders improved to 32–18, strong enough to qualify for the playoffs. In the first round, the D-Fenders earned their first playoff victory after defeating the Western Conference Champion Colorado 14ers. In the second round the D-Fenders lost to the Idaho Stampede, who went on to win the D-League Championship. Stephane Lasme shared the D-League Defensive Player of the Year Award and received an All D-League Honorable Mention. Lasme was also selected for the All-Star Game. Jelani McCoy was named All D-League Third Team and selected to the All-Star Game. McCoy also received a call-up to the NBA to play for the Denver Nuggets. Panaggio was named the All-Star game head coach. Coby Karl, son of NBA Coach George Karl, became the second player in history to play in an NBA game and a D-League game in the same day.

In 2008–09, Panaggio returned for his third and final year as head coach. The D-Fenders posted a disappointing 19–31 record. One highlight showcased Orien Greene making eight steals in one game against Utah (December 1, 2009). Joe Crawford received an All D-League Honorable Mention and was called up to the NBA to play for the New York Knicks. Rookie guard Sun Yue became the third Lakers player to play for the D-Fenders.

The D-Fenders played several of their home games at the Citizens Business Bank Arena in nearby Ontario, California. This was the first time that admission for D-Fenders' home games was charged solely for the D-Fenders as the main attraction. Paid attendance averaged about 1,500 per game. The D-Fenders continued to play occasional home games at Staples Center and eventually signed a long-term contract with Staples Center for the remainder of the third season and beyond.

=== Post-Panaggio era (2009–2011) ===
For the 2009–10 season, the D-Fenders brought in former assistant head coach Chucky Brown to be head coach. The D-Fenders posted a record of 16–34 and, for the first time, received no assignments or call-ups from the NBA. Joe Crawford and Diamon Simpson were selected for the All-Star Game. Crawford was also a participant in the All-Star Weekend H-O-R-S-E Contest. Dar Tucker was named All-Star Weekend Slam Dunk Champion.

In May 2010, the D-Fenders announced that they would not field a team for the 2010–11 season. Coach Brown's contract was not renewed and Assistant General Manager Bonnie Jill Laflin was released. For the season, the Lakers affiliated with the Bakersfield Jam, an affiliate of the Los Angeles Clippers.

On June 9, 2011, the D-Fenders announced they would return for the 2011–2012 season and would play home games at the Toyota Sports Center in El Segundo. The headquarters for the Los Angeles Lakers and D-Fenders organizations, the TSC has just 365 seats are available for public sale and no seat is further than six rows from the court. This news was tempered by the looming NBA lockout and a desire by the Lakers organization to cut overhead. One early casualty was D-Fender General Manager Ronnie Lester. Lester, who had a 24-year association with the Lakers, could not come to terms with the Lakers, and his expiring contract was not renewed, along with some other 20 Lakers staffers.

=== Breakout season (2011–2012) ===
Glenn Carraro, the remaining D-Fender assistant general manager, was promoted to general manager. On August 18, 2011, the D-Fenders announced Eric Musselman as their new head coach. Among Musselman's body of work was previous service as head coach for the NBA's Sacramento Kings and Golden State Warriors.

The NBA lockout began and the Los Angeles Laker Girls, who had been practicing all summer for their upcoming Lakers game performances, now had no audience. The Lakers organization decided the Laker Girls would perform at the D-Fender home games for the season.

With a new general manager, a new head coach, and the excitement of the Laker Girls, the D-Fenders had a breakout season, posting a regular season record of 38–12, which at the time was the best regular season record ever posted in the D-League. In a season of great individual success, two D-Fenders players placed in the top five for season scoring averages: Brandon Costner (20.3 ppg) and Elijah Millsap (19.4 ppg). Malcolm Thomas was named to the All NBA D-League First Team and the Rookie First Team after ranking second in the NBADL for blocks (2.3) and third in rebounds (9.1) and field goal percentage (.619). Both Courtney Fortson and Millsap were named to the All D-League Second Team. Costner was named All D-League Third Team, and Zach Andrews received an Honorable Mention honor. A team record four D-Fenders were selected for the All Star Game: Andrews, Costner, Millsap and Gerald Green. Green was also named the MVP of the All-Star Game. Concluding regular season play, the D-Fenders breezed through the first and second rounds of the playoffs undefeated, easily winning the Western Conference Title. In the finals, the D-fenders took game 1 but dropped the next two games to fall to the Austin Toros. To cap off this historic season, Musselman was named D-League Coach of the Year and the front office earned the first-ever NBA Development League Championship Award, an annual recognition award given to the team that best embodies the NBA D-League's goal of developing NBA basketball talent via call-ups and/or assignments.

=== Playoff upsets (2012–2015) ===
For the 2012–13 campaign, the D-Fenders had a new head coach, former NBA Sacramento Kings Head Coach Reggie Theus. The D-Fenders played a 50-game regular season of which 25 games were scheduled as home games. The Laker Girls decided to stay on and once again performed at all home games. In a year characterized by L.A.'s shuffling of players, the team would finish with a 21–29 record in Theus's only season at the helm. The one constant throughout the year for the D-Fenders was Fortson, who finished the year as the D-League's leader in assists (7.1) and was second in steals (2.0) while also tying a franchise record 15 assists in a single game. He would go on to be named to the NBA D-League All-Star squad, his first career selection to the event.

In May 2013, the D-Fenders named former NBA player Mark Madsen as head coach, but he subsequently accepted a position as a player development coach for the Lakers on July 19, leaving the D-Fenders with a head coaching vacancy. As a result, Bob MacKinnon stepped in as the team's coach, eventually leading the D-Fenders franchise to a 31–21 record and its second West Division title in franchise history. In his first season with the team, in-season acquisition Manny Harris posted 49 points against the Idaho Stampede on January 10, 2014, to set a then Los Angeles D-Fenders franchise record. Harris would go on to become the first player ever called up to the Lakers from the D-Fenders franchise. Three weeks later, on January 31, 2014, Terrence Williams scored 50 points to set a new D-Fenders franchise record. On February 5, 2014, the D-Fenders set an NBA D-League record with 26 three-pointers made along with a franchise record 155 points scored. On February 8, 2014, Harris again set a new franchise scoring record, this time with 56 points. Overall, Williams earned All-NBA D-League third team honors and James Southerland earned All-NBA D-League Rookie second team honors as the D-Fenders suffered an early exit from the NBA D-League Playoffs.

On August 28, 2014, the D-Fenders hired Phil Hubbard as head coach, the team's sixth coach in as many years. Offensive firepower was never an issue for the team, as Jabari Brown finished as the league's leading scorer with 24.4 points per outing. Brown joined Vander Blue and Roscoe Smith as members of the 2015 All-Star Game. Overall, Los Angeles scored the third-most points per game (116.8), while ranking second in points in the paint (57.4) and on fast-break scoring (21.3). The D-Fenders would finish with a record of 17–33 while missing the playoffs.

=== Final seasons as D-Fenders (2015–2017) ===
Ahead of the 2015–16 season, the D-Fenders hired Conner Henry as head coach. However, he left to become an assistant coach for the Orlando Magic. On August 5, Casey Owens was named the head coach of the D-Fenders. Los Angeles eventually advanced to the NBA D-League finals for the second time in franchise history, even as the team finished with a 27–23 regular season record. Ultimately, the D-Fenders would fall one game short of a league championship as the Sioux Falls Skyforce capped off the best season in NBA D-League history. Blue led the league in points scored (1,262) and finished second in scoring average (26.3) en route to a First Team All-NBA D-League selection. Meanwhile, Jeff Ayres (first team) and Ryan Gomes (third team) were also awarded with All-NBA D-League honors. Gomes, an NBA veteran, provided a large boost to the D-Fenders lineup and was named as the NBA D-League's Impact Player of the Year after averaging 18.2 points, 8.1 rebounds and 3.1 assists. Point guard Josh Magette led the league in assists (9.2) and steals (2.4), while two D-Fenders earned GATORADE Call-Ups: Ayres (L.A. Clippers) and Justin Harper (Detroit Pistons).

On September 12, 2016, the D-Fenders announced the addition of Coby Karl as the team's head coach prior to the 2016–17 season. Karl, the son of NBA coaching legend George Karl, was a former player for the Lakers and D-Fenders. The second person to ever play in an NBA and NBADL game in the same day, Karl entered his first head coaching position in Los Angeles.

=== Rebrand as South Bay Lakers (2017–2026) ===
The South Bay Lakers logo used from 2017 to 2026.

On April 9, 2017, the Los Angeles Lakers announced that the D-Fenders would be re-branded as the South Bay Lakers at the conclusion of the 2016–17 season and the playoffs. They also announced that they were leaving the Toyota Events Center and moving into the new UCLA Health Training Center in El Segundo, which would also serve at the Lakers new practice facility. After the D-Fenders were eliminated from the D-League playoffs on April 11, 2017, the team began the re-branding process. The newly re-branded club unveiled its primary and secondary marks on April 8, 2017.

The 2018–19 South Bay Lakers placed fourth in the Pacific Division and had a record of 21–29, missing the playoffs. The 2019–20 season was curtailed due to the onset of the COVID-19 pandemic while the Lakers were outside of a playoff position, and then the team opted out of the single-site 2021 season. In July 2021, head coach Karl was announced as not returning to the organization and was replaced by Los Angeles Lakers' assistant coach Miles Simon.

=== Rebrand as Coachella Valley Lakers (2026–present) ===
On April 30, 2026, the Los Angeles Lakers announced that the team would be relocated to the Greater Palm Springs region in California and be re-branded as the Coachella Valley Lakers with a new logo. Starting in the 2026–27 NBA G League season, Acrisure Arena in Thousand Palms, California will serve as the venue for the team's home games.

== Current roster ==
Coachella Valley Lakers roster
Players

Pos.	No.	Player	Height	Weight	DOB	From
F	21	Luke Goode	6 ft 7 in (2.01 m)	210 lb (95 kg)	2002-08-24	Indiana
F	47	Arthur Kaluma (TW)	6 ft 7 in (2.01 m)	225 lb (102 kg)	2002-03-01	Texas
G	30	Chris Mañon (TW)	6 ft 4 in (1.93 m)	209 lb (95 kg)	2001-12-09	Vanderbilt
F	31	AK Okereke (TW)	6 ft 7 in (2.01 m)	244 lb (111 kg)	2003-07-02	Vanderbilt
G	55	Ethan Taylor	6 ft 5 in (1.96 m)	205 lb (93 kg)	2002-02-06	Air Force

Coaches
Head coach
- Zach Guthrie
Assistant(s)
- Alex Cerda
- Mo Charlo
- Liam Flynn
- Perry Huang

Legend
- (DP) Unsigned draft pick
- (FA) Free agent
- (S) Suspended
- (P) Prospects
- (NBA) On assignment from NBA affiliate
- (TW) Two-way affiliate player
- Injured

Roster
Updated: July 3, 2026

== Season-by-season record ==
Season	Division	Regular season				Playoffs
Season	Division	Finish	Wins	Losses	Pct.	Playoffs
Los Angeles D-Fenders
2006–07	Western	5th	23	27	.460	
2007–08	Western	2nd	32	18	.640	Won First Round (Colorado) 102–95; Lost Semifinals (Idaho) 90–97
2008–09	Western	5th	19	31	.380	
2009–10	Western	9th	16	34	.320	
2010–11	Suspended operations					
2011–12	Western	1st	38	12	.760	Won First Round (Iowa) 2–0; Won Semifinals (Bakersfield) 2–0; Lost D-League Finals (Austin) 1–2
2012–13	Western	3rd	21	29	.420	
2013–14	Western	1st	31	19	.620	Lost First Round (Santa Cruz) 0–2
2014–15	Pacific	4th	17	33	.340	
2015–16	Pacific	2nd	27	23	.540	Won First Round (Reno) 2–1; Won Semifinals (Austin) 2–1; Lost D-League Finals (Sioux Falls) 0–2
2016–17	Pacific	1st	34	16	.680	Lost First Round (Rio Grande Valley) 1–2
South Bay Lakers
2017–18	Pacific	2nd	28	22	.560	Won First Round (Oklahoma) 125–105; Won Conf. Semifinal (Reno) 126–109; Lost Conf. Final (Austin) 93–104
2018–19	Pacific	4th	21	29	.420	
2019–20	Pacific	4th	19	25	.432	Season cancelled by COVID-19 pandemic
2020–21	Opted out of single-site season					
2021–22	Western	3rd	21	11	.656	Won Conference Quarterfinal (Santa Cruz) 134–123; Lost Conference Semifinal (Agua Caliente) 110–112
2022–23	Western	3rd	21	11	.656	Lost Conference Quarterfinal (Rio Grande Valley) 122–124
2023–24	Western	11th	18	16	.529	
2024–25	Western	9th	16	18	.471	
2025–26	Western	1st	26	10	.722	Won Conference Quarterfinal (San Diego) 122–119; Won Conference Semifinal (Rio Grande Valley) 112–97; Lost Conference Final (Stockton) 97–101
Coachella Valley Lakers
Regular season			428	384	.527	
Playoffs			15	15	.500	

== Head coaches ==
#	Head coach	Term	Regular season				Playoffs				Achievements
#	Head coach	Term	G	W	L	Win%	G	W	L	Win%	Achievements
1	Dan Panaggio	2006–2009	150	74	76	.493	2	1	1	.500	
2	Chucky Brown	2009–2010	50	16	34	.320	—	—	—	—	
3	Eric Musselman	2011–2012	50	38	12	.760	7	5	2	.714	D-League Coach of the Year: 2012
4	Reggie Theus	2012–2013	50	21	29	.420	—	—	—	—	
5	Mark Madsen	2013	Left before coaching a game								
6	Bob MacKinnon, Jr.	2013–2014	50	31	19	.620	2	0	2	.000	
7	Phil Hubbard	2014–2015	50	17	33	.340	—	—	—	—	
8	Casey Owens	2015–2016	50	27	23	.540	8	4	4	.500	
9	Coby Karl	2016–2020	150	83	67	.553	6	3	3	.500	
10	Miles Simon	2021–2023	64	42	22	.656	2	1	2	.333	
11	Dane Johnson	2023–2024	34	18	16	.529	–	–	–	–	
12	Zack Guthrie	2024–2026	34	16	18	.471	–	–	–	–	
13	Alex Cerda	2026–present				–	–	–	–	–	

== NBA affiliates ==
=== Coachella Valley Lakers ===
- Los Angeles Lakers (2026–present)

=== South Bay Lakers ===
- Los Angeles Lakers (2017–2026)

=== Los Angeles D-Fenders ===
- Los Angeles Lakers (2006–2017)
