= Thomas Guthrie (disambiguation) =

Thomas Guthrie (1803–1873) was a Scottish divine and philanthropist

Thomas Guthrie may also refer to:

- Thomas Guthrie (director), British director, actor and musician
- Thomas Anstey Guthrie (1856–1934), English novelist and journalist, who wrote comic novels under the pseudonym F. Anstey
- Thomas Maule Guthrie (1870–1943), Scottish Liberal Member of Parliament for Moray and Nairn 1922–1923

== See also ==
- Thomas Guthrie Marquis (1864–1936), Canadian author
