= Robert Guthrie =

Robert Guthrie may refer to:

- Robert Guthrie (microbiologist) (1916–1995), American microbiologist
- Robert Guthrie (politician) (1857–1921), member of the Australian Senate
- Robert V. Guthrie (1930–2005), American psychologist and educator

== See also ==
- Guthrie (surname)
