= Kenneth Sylvan Guthrie =

Scottish-born American philosopher and writer (1871–1940)

Kenneth Sylvan Launfal Guthrie
- Born: July 22, 1871; Dundee, Scotland
- Died: January 1, 1940 (aged 68)
- Known for: Translations of Plotinus, Proclus, Numenius; Neo-Platonism scholarship

Academic background
- Education: University of the South; Tulane University; Harvard University; Medico-Chirurgical College; Columbia University

Academic work
- Institutions: University of the South; All Saints' Church, New York
- Notable works: Complete Works of Plotinus (1918)

Kenneth Sylvan Launfal Guthrie (1871–1940), philosopher and writer, was a grandson of feminist Frances Wright and brother of William Norman Guthrie, a Scottish-born Episcopalian priest. Kenneth S. Guthrie issued a series of translations of ancient philosophical writers, "making available to the public the neglected treasures of Neo-platonism." Among his works was a translation of the complete works of Plotinus (1918). He was also an active prohibitionist. In addition he composed music and wrote poetry. He has been described as a "brilliant but eccentric scholar" by Manly Palmer Hall.

== Life ==
Kenneth S. Guthrie was born in Dundee, Scotland, July 22, 1871. He attended school in a range of cities, including Florence, Lausaune, Frankfurt, Wiesbaden, Brussels, Hadleigh, Edinburgh, New York, St. Stephen's College, Annandale, N. Y.

He graduated with a B.A., M.A., and G.D., from the University of the South in Sewanee, Tennessee, 1890 and 1893; a Ph.D. from Tulane in 1893; A.M., Harvard, 1894. In addition he qualified as an M.D., with three gold medals at Medico Chiurgical College, Philadelphia, 1903. A second Ph.D. was obtained at Columbia, 1915.

However he was never able to gain a foothold in academic life, and was forced to support himself by teaching children, freelance writing and lecturing. A number of his books were therefore written on subjects of popular interest, such as Rosicrucianism, for money.

He was ordained in the Protestant Episcopal Church as a deacon in 1890, and as a priest in 1897. He was then placed in charge of All Saints Church, New York. He held the post of Professor in Extension at the University of the South, Sewanee.

He taught French for five years. He also taught German and French for one term at South Brooklyn Evening High School in 1909-10.

Among his publications before 1931 were The Philosophy of Plotinos; Complete Translation of Plotinos; Message of Philo Judaeus; Of Communion with God; Spiritual Message of Literature; Stories for Young Folks; Why You Really Want to Become a Churchman; Life of Zoroaster, in the Words of his Hymns; the Gathas of Zoroaster, Text, Translation, Criticism; The Mother-Tongue Method of Teaching Modern Languages; Limits and Mission of History of Education; Teachers' Problems, and How to Solve Them; and The Spiritual Message of Literature: A Manual of Comparative Literature with Topical Outlines and Lists of Useful Books for School, College, and Private Use.

An English translation of the Popol Vuh by Kenneth S. Guthrie, Ph.D., A.M., M.D., appears in The Word Magazine beginning in October, 1905 (Vol. 11, No. 1), and contained a valuable commentary.

== The translations ==
The works that he chose to translate are often very obscure. Few of them had ever been translated into English before; in many cases they have not been translated since. In a number of cases French translations existed. He was accused in print of translating from the French, rather than the Greek, a charge he denied. However his translations are better where there was a preceding translation.

During his lifetime he was obliged to self-publish these books, and sell them by post in mimeographed form, often complaining of poverty and lack of recognition and support. Almost all of them have remained in print ever since.

== The works of Proclus ==
Guthrie was involved in "resurrecting" Proclus. This he did by translating those of his writings which were neither too bulky nor already in print.

He was inspired to do this by a strange visit in 1924. A former Californian miner turned seaman named Emil Verch came to see him in his study at All Saints Church, NY. Verch told Guthrie that he had had a vision of a sage by the name of Proclus, giving lectures in a language unknown to Verch. When Guthrie told Verch about Proclus and his works, Mr. Verch begged him to spread the word about this writer by means of an English translation.

Verch had no money to finance the task he had set. Guthrie, in his own words, "tightened an already tight belt by one notch" and set to work. In the process he came to esteem Proclus as one of the greatest ornaments of humanity, approaching as near as possible to the ideal of the 'universal man', in whom every aspect of human nature is exercised and developed in mutual harmony.

== The slave-galleries ==
Before the abolition of slavery, there were facilities in New York for negro slaves. An early mentions of the term "slave gallery" to describe the strange spaces in All Saints' Church dates from a 1916 article in the New York Sun entitled, "Last Remaining Slave Gallery in New York." The article remembered the days of slavery in New York state, painting a somewhat nostalgic portrait of "pickininnies" crowding in the galleries while their Episcopalian masters worshipped below.

In 1921, the Living Church published an investigation of the "Slave Gallery" in what was by then a "venerable but little known Church," remembering the days when Episcopalians brought their slaves to church because it was their obligation to convert them or maintain their faith in God. The articles cited no sources for their stories of the slave gallery, both of which assumed that slavery was in full effect in the 1830s in New York though it was abolished in 1827, and implied that all African American New Yorkers were slaves, though even when slavery was legal, free blacks far outnumbered slaves.

These articles were based on interviews with Dr. Kenneth S. Guthrie, who became Rector of All Saints' in 1915 and was committed to bringing the stories of the slave galleries to light.

In the 1920s, under the leadership of the Rev. Guthrie, the congregation tried to come to terms with the memory of slavery and segregation in its church. In 1924, in celebration of the 100th anniversary of the congregation's founding, All Saints' Church put on a pageant in which it remembered the slave gallery and the slaves who sat there. The Church's oral tradition already preserved the memory of a gallery created for and filled by slaves. By the 1930s, guide books reported a "Lincoln Museum" housed in the church, in which an iron shackle and a bill of sale for a slave were exhibited.

== Bibliography ==
- Kenneth Sylvan Guthrie, Proclus's Biography, Hymns and Works: Master-Key Edition: Putting the Reader in Full Command of the Whole Subject, and Giving the Full Englished Text of All Relevant Inaccessible Minor Works: Editio Princeps. Teocalli, No. Yonkers Platonist Press (ca. 1925).
- The hymns of Zoroaster usually called the Gathas : for the first time made entirely accessible by transliterated text, translation, dictionary and grammar, introductory tables, analysis, higher and Biblical criticism, complete concordance and subject index, by Kenneth Sylvan Guthrie. c1914.
- Numenius of Apamea, the father of neo-Platonism : works, biography, message, sources, and influence by Kenneth Sylvan Guthrie. 1931.
- Porphyry's Launching-points to the realm of mind : an introduction to the neoplatonic philosophy of Plotinus translated from the Greek by Kenneth Sylvan Guthrie; with an introduction by Michael Hornum. 1988.
- The Pythagorean sourcebook and library : an anthology of ancient writings which relate to Pythagoras and Pythagorean philosophy / compiled and translated by Kenneth Sylvan Guthrie; with additional translations by Thomas Taylor and Arthur Fairbanks, Jr; introduced and edited by David R. Fideler; with a foreword by Joscelyn Godwin. 1987.
- The Spiritual Message of Literature: A Manual of Comparative Literature with Topical Outlines and Lists of Useful Books for School, College, and Private Use. Brooklyn: Comparative Literature Press, 1913.
