= Concept-Oriented Reading Instruction =

Education program

Concept-Oriented Reading Instruction (CORI) was developed in 1993 by Dr. John T. Guthrie with a team of elementary teachers and graduate students. The project designed and implemented a framework of conceptually oriented reading instruction to improve students' amount and breadth of reading, intrinsic motivations for reading, and strategies of search and comprehension. The framework emphasized five phases of reading instruction in a content domain: observing and personalizing, searching and retrieving, comprehending and integrating, communicating to others, and interacting with peers to construct meaning. CORI instruction was contrasted to experience-based teaching and strategy instruction in terms of its support for motivational and cognitive development.

== History ==
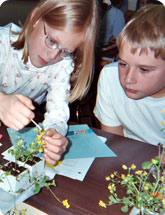

CORI's aims are to support:

- Reading Comprehension via activating background knowledge, questioning, summarizing, searching, organizing graphically, and interpreting stories
- Science Inquiry via observation, using knowledge, questioning, designing investigations, collecting data, drawing conclusions, and explaining results conceptually. The science theme was the survival concepts (ecology) of feeding, locomotion, defense, predation, respiration, reproduction, competition, communication, and adjustment to habitat.
- Motivation via knowledge goals for reading, hands-on experiences, interesting books, choices about learning, and collaboration with classmates
- Reading and Science Integration via relating observations in hands-on science activities to contents and characters in literary and information books and connecting students' interests in the environment to their motivations for book reading
- Student Writing via writing entries in portfolios that demonstrated the following: information text reading, literary text reading, science concepts, science processes, and motivation for reading.

“For nearly 20 years, Guthrie and colleagues have been refining CORI, a program designed to promote a number of literacy goals through the use of broad interdisciplinary themes, primarily drawn from science curricula, such as exploring the impact of humans on animal habitats. CORI provides explicit instruction in reading strategies, such a questioning, activating background knowledge, searching for information, summarizing, and synthesizing information in order to communicate with others. Instruction involves hands-on investigations, inquiry with text, strategy instruction, working in collaborative inquiry teams, and writing to publish and present findings. CORI has been shown to increase students’ science inquiry strategies, and overall text comprehension compared to control classrooms with separate science and literacy curricula and/or strategy instruction in reading alone. Of particular interest in the CORI research is the pivotal role that motivation, in all of its instantiations (interest, self-efficacy, and achievement motivation), plays in learning both science and literacy.”

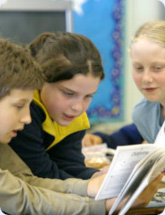

CORI investigated the motivations, cognitive competencies, and instructional support needed to increase reading comprehension and engagement of middle school students in science concepts (ecology) and social studies (U.S. Civil War) through the Reading Engagement for Adolescent Learning (REAL) Project. Reading comprehension strategies included: activating background knowledge, questioning, summarizing, inferencing, and concept mapping. Intrinsic motivations included involvement, challenge, curiosity, social interactions, and the teaching of concepts and inquiry skills. Books, educational videos, websites, and other supplemental materials were used to aid students’ learning and teachers’ instruction.

The CORI program equipped participating teachers with the skills to accomplish these classroom goals through interactive professional development workshops. These workshops were given several times during the school year with these teacher-desired outcomes in the following areas:

Classroom practices: support for motivation; foster engagement with text; sustain reading engagement across the year; energize learning from information text; connect Common Core State Standards to motivation; use research-based approaches

Motivation and engagement practices: setting up partnerships, collaborations, and teams; providing productive choices, large and small; building relevance into reading and writing; encouraging reading values; enabling students to develop their identities; increasing learning in Common Core State Standards

Integrating cognitive strategy instruction includes guidance to: teach higher-order reading skills, improve students' information text comprehension, integrate reading in content domains, provide strategy instruction in subject matters, target digital literacies and traditional textbooks

The objective of CORI is to increase the amount of engaged reading through the use of explicit cognitive and motivational supports or scaffolds. Cognitively, the CORI program stresses the learning of conceptual ideas.

== Program specifics ==
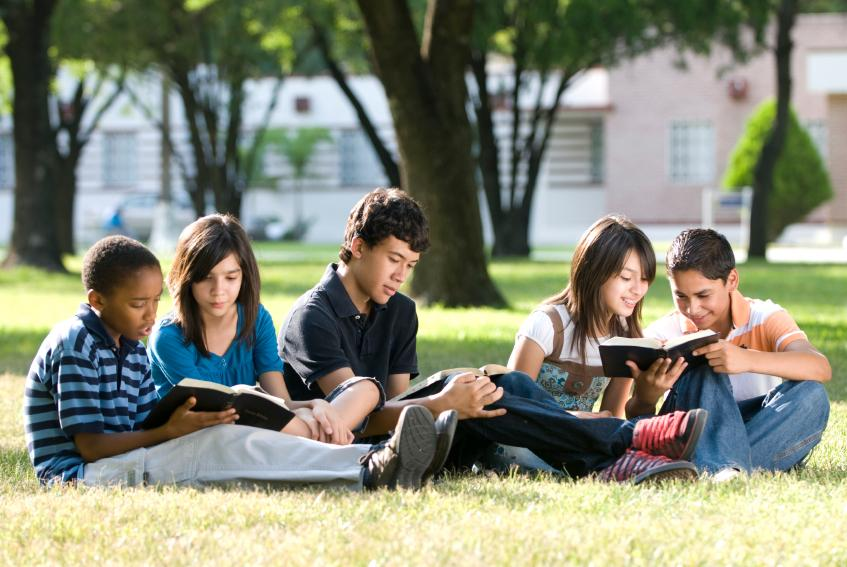

CORI instruction can take place within the domain of any subject matter at any grade level. Lessons are developed for the express purpose of increasing student engagement. In turn, students’ amount of reading increases, and ultimately, their use of reading strategies, intrinsic motivation, and achievement increase. Texts on a topic are made available to the students, and along with strategy instruction and motivational support, deep understanding of a concept develops. This shows CORI's emphasis on thematic learning.

In keeping with a guided reading model of instruction, lessons were provided for small groups at the struggling reader, on-grade level, and advanced reader levels. Writing and independent reading are part of the CORI program, as is a culminating activity for a unit of study.

Teacher training modules, classroom videos, related research articles and books, and research findings in elementary and middle schools on the CORI website www.corilearning.com provide necessary information to become further informed about this program.
