= Alexander Kaimbacher =

Austrian operatic tenor

Alexander Kaimbacher (born 26 December 1969) is an Austrian opera, operetta, oratorio, Lied and concert tenor.

== Life ==
Born in Villach, Kaimbacher studied music, theatre studies and German at the University of Vienna, as well as acting and singing at the Goethean Conservatory and Waldorf Pedagogical Academy. His singing teachers were Hilde Rössel-Majdan and Bernhard Adler. The artist completed master classes with Dietrich Fischer-Dieskau, Nicolai Gedda and Constantin Zacharia.

In 1999, he made his debut as Rustichello in Tan Dun's opera Marco Polo at the Neue Oper Wien. This was followed by guest engagements at the music theatres of Klagenfurt, Potsdam, Salzburg, Nuremberg, Lucerne, Meiningen, Zurich etc. His repertoire includes the great roles of his field from opera and operetta such as Kilian in Der Freischütz, Andres as well as the Fool in Wozzeck, Kunz Vogelgesang in Die Meistersinger von Nürnberg, Tamino in The Magic Flute, Fenton in Falstaff, Alfred in Die Fledermaus, the Tsarevich in Der Zarewitsch, the title role in Benjamin Britten's Albert Herring, Orfeo in Monteverdi's L'Orfeo and Adam in Der Vogelhändler. The artist took part in several world premieres. Among others, at the Bregenz Festival in Die schöne Welt by Georg Friedrich Haas and as Geppone in Der Herr Nordwind by Heinz Karl Gruber, at the Opernhaus Zürich.

From 2007 to 2010, Kaimbacher was an ensemble member at the Vienna State Opera.

In addition to his opera and operetta performances, his attention is focused on the Lied, concert and oratorio repertoire, and church music in general. So far he has sung in the concert halls of Vienna, Linz, Munich, Salzburg, New York, Washington, Tel Aviv, Haifa and Vancouver, among others. His repertoire includes, for example, all the passions by Heinrich Schütz as well as all the masses by Johann Sebastian Bach, Joseph Haydn, Wolfgang Amadeus Mozart and Franz Schubert. Furthermore, he sings works by Gioachino Rossini, Felix Mendelssohn Bartholdy, Carl Orff, Ernst Krenek, Arthur Honegger, Zoltán Kodály etc.

== Awards ==
- 2000: Armin Weltner Förderpreis (Opernhaus Zürich)
- 2016: Award of the daily newspaper Die Welt as "best singer" in Germany for his portrayal of Aschenbach in Benjamin Britten's opera Death in Venice at the Bielefeld Opera.
