= Frank Guthrie =

Frank Guthrie may refer to:

- Frank Guthrie (politician) (1893–1955), Australian politician
- Frank Guthrie (rugby union) (1869–1954), South African rugby player
- Frank Edwin Guthrie (1923-1994), entomologist, recipient of the 1983 North Carolina Award for Science
- Frank Guthrie (swimming coach), member of the International Swimming Hall of Fame

== See also ==
- Francis Guthrie (1831–1899), South African mathematician and botanist
