= Donald Guthrie =

Donald Guthrie may refer to:

- Donald Guthrie (theologian) (1916–1992), British New Testament scholar
- Donald Guthrie (politician) (1840–1915), Scottish-born Ontario lawyer and political figure
- Donald Guthrie (physician) (1880–1958), American surgeon
