= Peter Guthrie =

Peter Guthrie may refer to:

- Peter Guthrie (footballer) (born 1961)
- Peter Guthrie (politician)
