= Zach Guthrie (basketball) =

American basketball coach

Los Angeles Lakers
- Position: Assistant coach
- League: NBA

Personal information
- Born: San Antonio, Texas, U.S.

Career information
- College: University of Texas

Career history

Coaching
- 2016–2020: Utah Jazz (assistant)
- 2020–2021: Dallas Mavericks (assistant)
- 2021–2024: Washington Wizards (assistant)
- 2024–2026: South Bay Lakers
- 2026–present: Los Angeles Lakers (assistant)

Zach Guthrie is an American professional basketball coach who currently serves as an assistant coach for the Los Angeles Lakers of the National Basketball Association (NBA).

== Early life ==
Zach Guthrie was born in San Antonio, Texas in 1988. He graduated from the McCombs School Of Business at the University Of Texas. His father, Bruce, worked in marketing for the San Antonio Spurs.

== Coaching career ==
Guthrie began his coaching career as a basketball operations intern at the Austin Toros of the NBA D League in 2009-10, before working with the San Antonio Spurs and Orlando Magic in scouting roles. His work with the Toros saw him cross paths with Quin Snyder, who hired him as an assistant coach with the Utah Jazz in 2016.

In 2020, the Dallas Mavericks hired Guthrie as an assistant coach under head coach Rick Carlisle.

In 2021, Guthrie was hired as an assistant coach for the Washington Wizards. With the Wizards, he worked under head coaches Wes Unseld Jr. and Brian Keefe.

On September 10, 2024, the South Bay Lakers of the NBA G League announced they had hired Guthrie as the team's head coach. He won G League coach of the month in March 2026, and also led the team to the G League playoffs.

On July 17, 2026, the Los Angeles Lakers hired Guthrie to serve as an assistant coach on their staff under head coach JJ Redick.
