= Annales pharmaceutiques françaises =

- Discipline: Pharmacology, Pharmacy
- Language: French

Publication details
- History: 1943–present
- Publisher: Elsevier Masson (France)
- Frequency: Bimonthly

Standard abbreviations
- ISO 4: Ann. Pharm. Fr.

Indexing
- ISSN: 0003-4509
- OCLC no.: 260031784

Annales pharmaceutiques françaises is a French journal founded in 1943. It covers the fields of pharmacology and pharmacy. It was formed by merging the Journal de pharmacie et de chimie and the Bulletin des sciences pharmacologiques.
