= Samuel Guthrie (physician) =

American physician

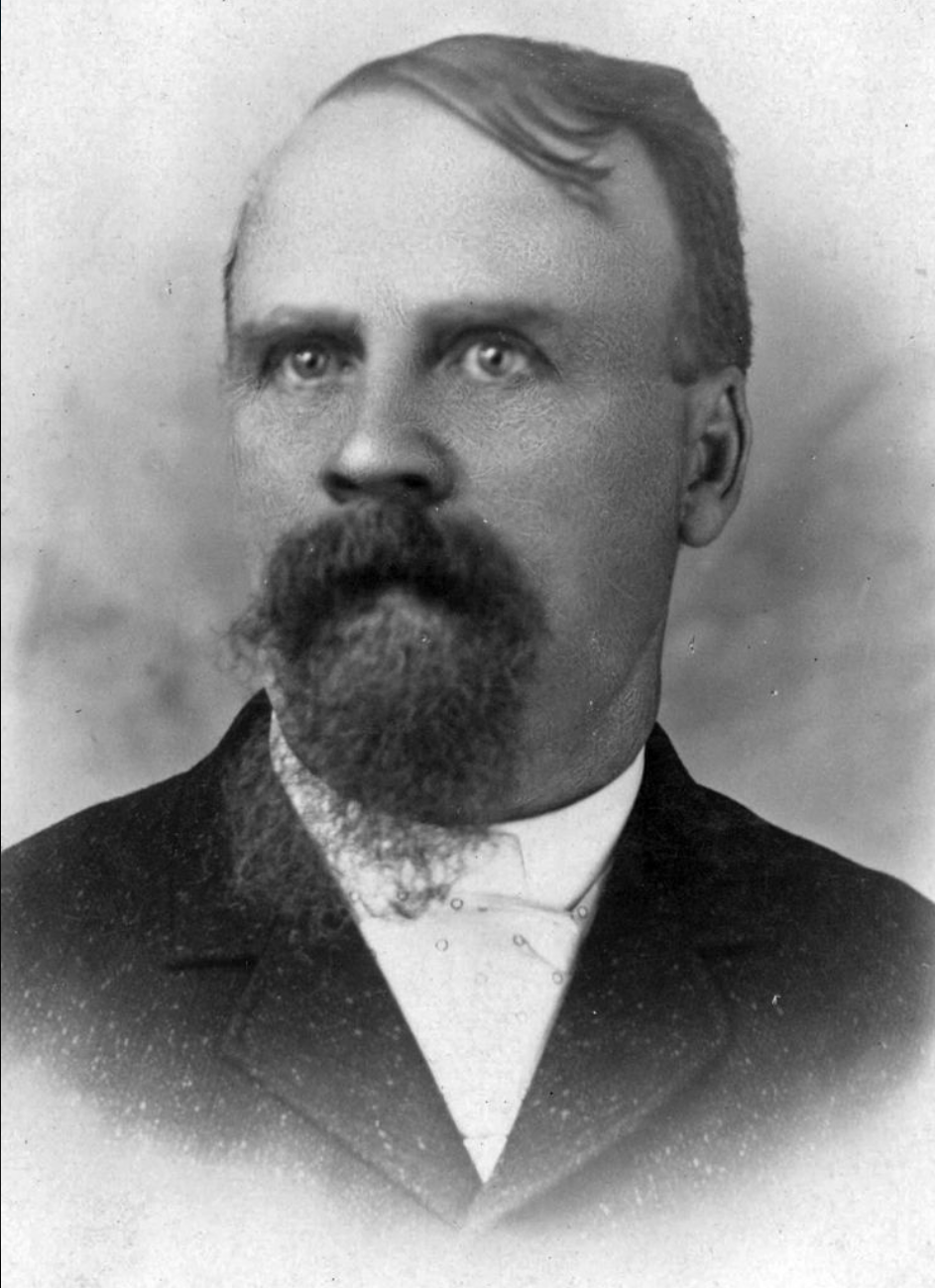
- Born: 1782; Brimfield, Massachusetts, U.S.
- Died: 1848 (aged 65–66)
- Known for: Discovery of chloroform
- Scientific career
- Fields: Medicine, chemistry

Signature
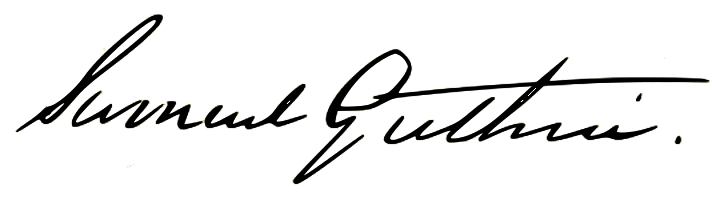

Samuel Guthrie (1782–1848) was an American medical doctor. He invented a form of percussion powder and also the punch lock for igniting it, which made the flintlock musket obsolete. He discovered chloroform independently in 1831.

== Life ==
=== Background ===
Samuel Guthrie was born in Brimfield, in Hampden's county, Massachusetts, in 1782.

"Dr. Guthrie was of dark complexion, medium stature, slender build, slightly stooping figure, and thoughtful mien; his head was well-formed and of full medium size, features slightly oval, nose prominent and a little irregular in shape."

— Memoirs of Dr. Samuel Guthrie

=== Family ===
His father, Dr. Samuel Guthrie, was a practicing medical doctor and surgeon in that village, and died there in 1808. His brother James, moved soon to Dayton, Ohio where he became a farmer and continued his life following only religious values. During his period in Smyrna, Samuel Guthrie married Sybil Sexton, by whom he had four children, two sons and two daughters. His son, Alfred, mechanical engineer, born on April 1, 1805, in Sherburne, New York; died 17 August 1882 in Chicago, Illinois, re-located with his parents to Sackett's Harbor in 1817, where he studied medicine and chemistry with his father, serving as his assistant at the time of his father's discovery of chloroform. He practiced medicine for ten years before moving on to other jobs due to an aversion to the field. In 1846 he settled in Chicago, where he advanced the idea of supplying the summit level of the Illinois and Michigan canal with water by raising it from Lake Michigan with steam power. The hydraulic works of this canal in Chicago were designed by him and constructed under his supervision, and when completed they were capable of handling a larger volume of water than any other similar works then in existence.

He then died in Chicago on the 17th of August 1882, at 78 years old.

Another son, Edwin, a physician who was born in Sherburne, New York, on December 11, 1806, and died in the Castle of Perote, Mexico, on July 20, 1847, studied medicine alongside his father before settling in Iowa and holding public office. He recruited a company of Iowa volunteers, of which he became captain, and proceeded to the front lines soon after the conflict with Mexico began. During the Battle of Pass La Hoya, he was wounded in the knee and died after two amputations. Guthrie county, Iowa, is named in his honour.

=== Career and education ===
Guthrie studied medicine with his father and then started his profession in Smyrna, Chenango.

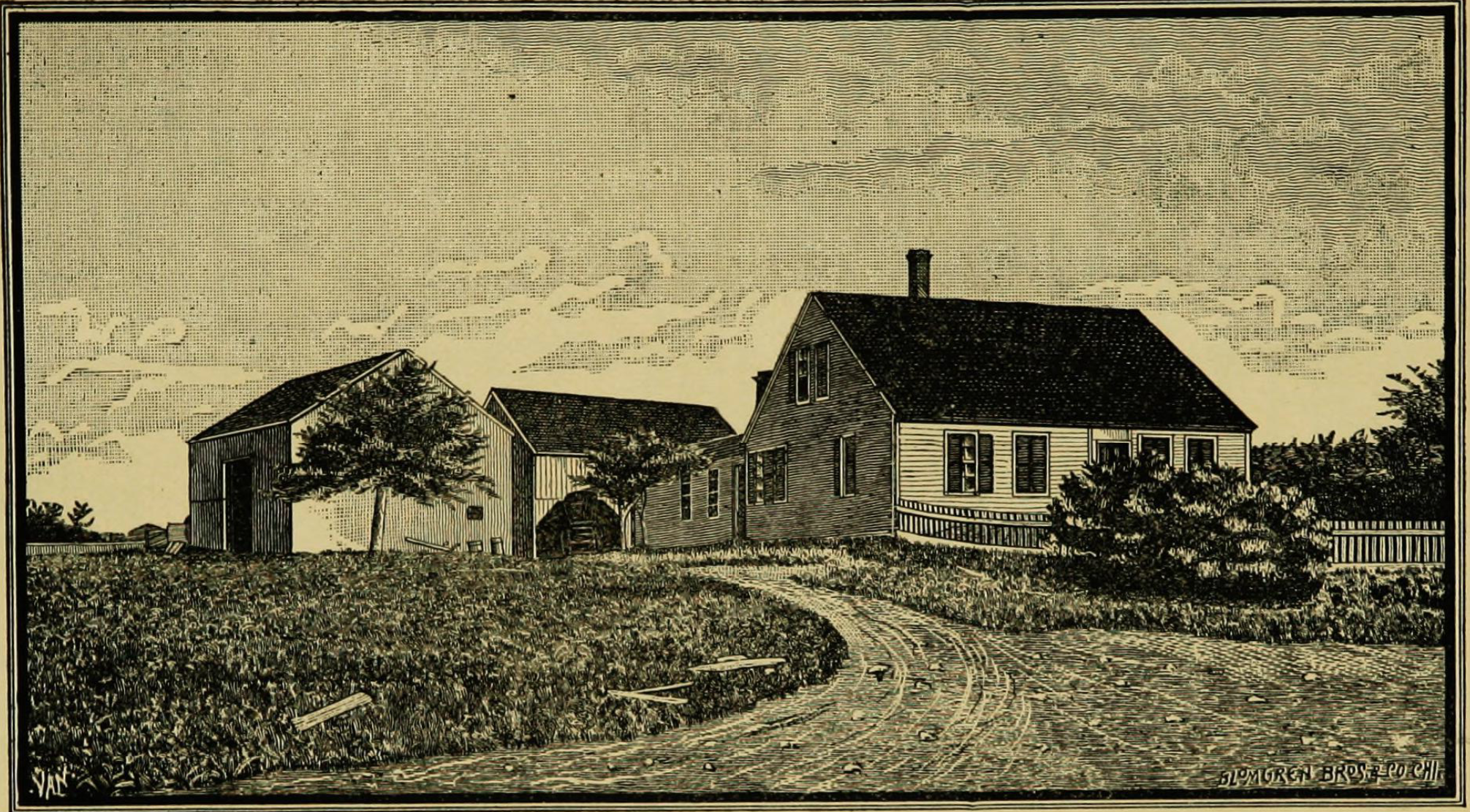
House at Brimfield, Massachusetts; where Guthrie was born

He was greatly inspired by the contemporaneous studies and researches conducted by Jenner on inoculation (1790-1803) and conducted some experiments on the subject during his professional traineeship with Dr. Waterhouse, of Cambridge. His first subject was his cousin Sarah Guthrie, she had been vaccinated and to demonstrate the efficacy of the shot slept with the patients she volunteered to take care of as a nurse. During the winter of 1810–1811, he attended a course of medical lectures in New York and in January 1815 again at the University of Philadelphia, considered great advantages in his career. During this period he kept a diary for 31 days, 275 pages were written, some of them precisely illustrated. In them he noted and criticized his professor based on the content of his lecture.

Guthrie, immediately after the degree, decided to join the U.S. Army and he distinguished himself by practicing the medical profession with honor and serving the local community. He worked as an army surgeon during the War of 1812, treating injured service members as American forces clashed with Great Britain over violations of maritime rights. After the war, in 1817, he moved to Sackets Harbor (then known as Sackett's Harbor) with his family in 1817, practicing medicine while establishing himself as a manufacturer and inventor.

During his life he cultivated also his passion for music, by learning and playing the violin.

== Achievements ==
=== Discoveries ===
Guthrie was most acceptably known as the inventor and manufacturer of an effective priming powder, called the "percussion pill" and the punch lock for it, which together replaced the flash-in-the-pan type of powder and made the old-fashioned flint-lock musket obsolete. As early as May, 1831, and probably earlier, his attention was turned to the "medicinal value of chloric ether", as set forth in Silliman's Chemistry.

==== Percussion Pill ====
In Sackets Harbor, he had also established a vinegar manufactory for supplying Madison Barracks, a military post established in 1812; here he also continued his experiments in the manufacture of powder. Guthrie's experiments with explosives, especially fulminating preparations, were, perhaps more extensive than those of any other man of his day, extending over a period of nearly forty years, during which time, he experienced many serious explosions; in one of these twenty-five pounds of half-dried powder burned with such energy as to lift the roof. In some of these explosions Guthrie sustained lasting and almost fatal injuries.

==== Chloroform ====
Guthrie's memoirs would be incomplete without a history of chloroform's discovery, a discovery that has immortalized the names of three men across the Western world. The honor of priority of discovery of chloroform has become a matter of National interest, and has been variously awarded to Guthrie, in America, Soubeiran, in France, and Liebig, the celebrated German chemist. According to some evidence, the discovery of chloroform can be traced back to the year 1831. In a letter to Professor Silliman dated February 15, 1832. Mr. Guthrie claims that the substance obtained by washing it with a strong solution of potassium carbonate was considered as "distilled off sulphuric acid".

Guthrie's process was repeated and verified by Silliman at Yale before the end of 1831, whereas Soubeiran's publication in the Journal de Pharmacie appeared in January 1832, and his claim to priority over Liebig in the Annales de Chimie et de Physique did not reach the public until February.

His letters detailing these chemical substances were published in the American Journal of Science in 1832, with editorial commentary, and reproduced in The Complete Writings of Samuel Guthrie the following year.

Guthrie's "chloric ether", created by distilling lime chloride with alcohol in a copper still in 1831, turned out to be chloroform, and the discovery was later applied in the medical field as a mild anaesthetic in amputation surgery.

"During the last six months a great number of persons have drunk the solution of chloric ether in my laboratory, not only very freely, but frequently to the point of intoxication, and so far as I have observed, it has appeared to be singularly grateful, both to the palate and stomach producing promptly a lively flow of animal spirit and consequent loquacity, and leaving after its operation little of that depression consequent to the use of ardent spirits. This free use of the article has been permitted in order to ascertain the effect of it in full doses on the healthy subject and thus to discover as dae as such trials would do, its probable value as a medicine."

— Memoirs of Dr. Samuel Guthrie

== Legacy ==
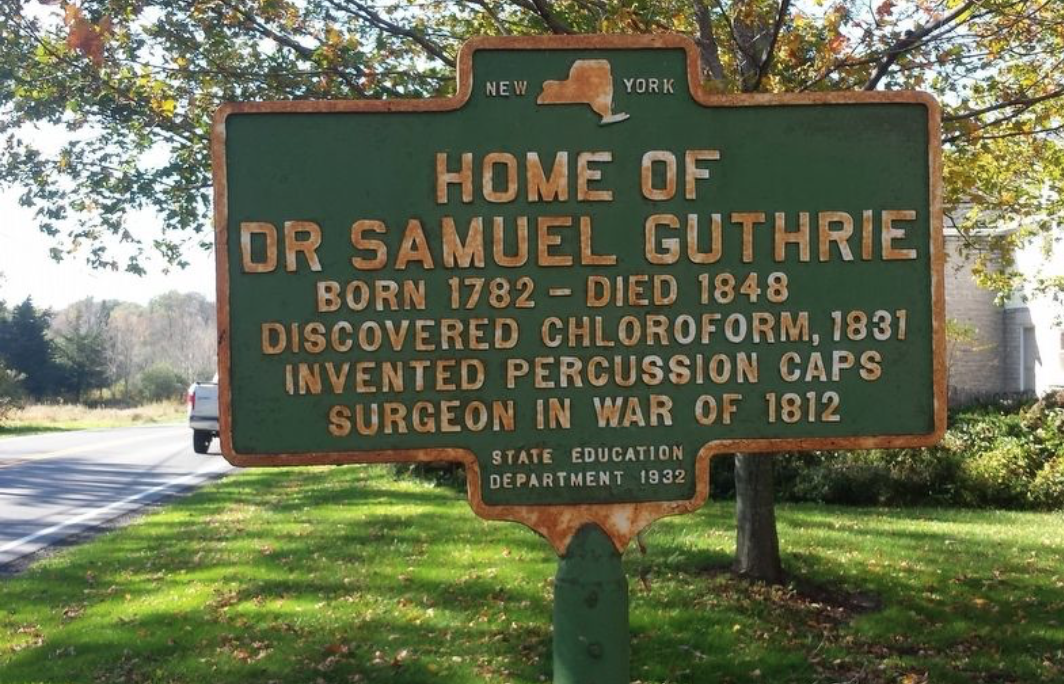
A bronze plaque honors Dr. Samuel Guthrie at the original entrance to the Guthrie Ambulatory Health Care Clinic

=== Guthrie Boulder ===
In Chicago, a giant stone dedicated in his name can be found in a park just west of the Rush University Medical Center (formerly the site of Presbyterian-St. Luke's Hospital) and north of the old Cook County Hospital building (now a Hyatt hotel).

The stone was brought to Chicago by Guthrie's grandson Ossian Guthrie, who had discovered it near Worth, Illinois, and wanted to use it to honor his grandfather's achievements. Ossian originally had the boulder placed in Grant Park, a short distance from the Art Institute of Chicago; amid legal disputes, it was moved after Ossian Guthrie's death in 1911 to Washington Park, where it sat for the next 40+ years. The stone was finally rededicated at its current location in 1957.

=== Clinic in his honour ===
- Guthrie Ambulatory Health Care Clinic, on Fort Drum, N.Y., opened in January 1991, and in May was dedicated to the memory of Samuel Guthrie.

=== His up-to-date library ===
In 1827, Guthrie helped to establish the Hounsfield Library, now Hay Memorial Library in Sackets Harbor, N.Y., which contained roughly 500 volumes, and he served as one of its trustees. The doctor's library received much attention. In it were to be found the standard medical and chemical works, the scientific journals, the Edinburgh Encyclopædia, Shakespeare, and novels including; Rasselas, Gil Blas, Don Quixote, and the Bible, in which he was well read. These he contemplated with the most profound admiration and reverence.

== See also ==
- Dr. Samuel Guthrie House

== Bibliography ==
- Fiske, John; Wilson, James"Appletons' Cyclopædia of American Biography Volume 3 : 1832–1914." Internet Archive, New York, D. Appleton and Company, 1 Jan. 1892
- Guthrie, O. Memoirs of Dr. Samuel Guthrie and the History of the Discovery of Chloroform. T.S. Chamberlin, 1919.
- Patterson, Richard. "Doctor Samuel Guthrie's Chloroform Letter." Journal of Medical Biography, vol. 10, no. 4, 2002, pp. 240–243.
- Strasser, Mike "Dr. Samuel Guthrie." Dr. Samuel Guthrie :: Fort Drum, 15 Dec. 2021
