= Guthrie =

Guthrie may refer to:

== People ==
- Guthrie (surname), a family name originating in Scotland
- Guthrie baronets in the United Kingdom
- Clan Guthrie, a Scottish clan
- Guthrie Govan (born 1971), British guitar virtuoso and guitar teacher

== Places ==
- Hundred of Guthrie, County of Way, South Australia
- Guthrie, Ontario, Canada
- Guthrie, Angus, Scotland

=== United States ===
- Guthrie, Arizona
- Guthrie, Illinois
- Guthrie, Indiana
- Guthrie, Kentucky
- Guthrie, Michigan
- Guthrie, Missouri
- Guthrie, Oklahoma
- Guthrie, Texas
- Guthrie, West Virginia
- Guthrie, Wisconsin
- Guthrie County, Iowa
- Guthrie Township, Hubbard County, Minnesota

=== Transport ===
- Guthrie Corridor Expressway, an expressway in Malaysia

== Other ==
- Guthrie (company), a Malaysian plantation company
- Guthrie test, a medical test performed on newborn infants to detect phenylketonuria
- Guthrie Theater, theater company in Minneapolis, Minnesota
- Guthrie's, an American restaurant chain

== See also ==
- Disappearance of Nancy Guthrie
