= Ralph Guthrie =

English footballer

Raplh Guthrie
Personal information
- Date of birth: 13 September 1932
- Place of birth: Hartlepool, England
- Date of death: 1996 (aged 63–64)
- Place of death: Hartlepool, England
- Position: Goalkeeper

Youth career
- 19xx–1952: Tow Law Town
- 1952–1954: Arsenal

Senior career*
Years	Team	Apps	(Gls)
1954–1956	Arsenal	2	(0)
1956–1958	Hartlepools United	78	(0)
- Horden Colliery Welfare
Total		80	(0)
- * Club domestic league appearances and goals

Ralph Guthrie (13 September 1932 – September 1996) was an English professional footballer who played as a goalkeeper.

== Career ==
Born in Hartlepool, Guthrie began his career in non-league football with Tow Law Town. He moved to Arsenal in December 1952, and made his debut in September 1954. He later played with Hartlepools United, before returning to non-league football with Horden Colliery Welfare.
