= Ron Guthrie =

English footballer

Personal information
- Full name: Ronald George Guthrie
- Date of birth: 19 April 1944 (age 82)
- Place of birth: Burradon, Northumberland, England
- Position: Full back

Senior career*
Years	Team	Apps	(Gls)
1963–1973	Newcastle United	56	(2)
1973–1975	Sunderland	66	(1)
1975–1977	Ashington		
1977–1981	Blyth Spartans		
1981–19??	North Shields		
Total		122	(3)
- * Club domestic league appearances and goals

Ronald George Guthrie (born 19 April 1944) is an English former professional footballer. After signing for Newcastle United in 1963, he played 56 league matches, scoring 2 goals, before joining Sunderland on 15 January 1973. A defender, he played at left back for Sunderland in the 1973 FA Cup Final winning team.

He left Sunderland in 1975, and joined non-League club Ashington. He later took charge of South African club Luistano on a player-manager basis.

He joined Blyth Spartans in September 1977. He was part of the famous 'giant killing' team that reached the 5th round of the FA Cup in 1978 losing to Wrexham in a replay at St James Park watched by over 42,000 with thousands locked outside, but not after drawing a potential home tie against Arsenal in the quarter finals. He left Blyth and signed for North Shields in 1981.

His first goal for Sunderland came in the 1972–73 FA Cup in a 2–0 victory over Luton Town.

He is the brother of fellow footballer Chris Guthrie, whose son Simon also played non-League football.

== Career statistics ==
Appearances and goals by club, season and competition
Club	Season	League			FA Cup		League Cup		Other		Total	
Club	Season	Division	Apps	Goals	Apps	Goals	Apps	Goals	Apps	Goals	Apps	Goals
Newcastle United	1966–67	First Division	6	0	0	0	0	0	0	0	6	0
Newcastle United	1967–68	First Division	5	0	0	0	0	0	0	0	5	0
Newcastle United	1968–69	First Division	5	0	0	0	1	0	1	0	7	0
Newcastle United	1969–70	First Division	15	1	0	0	0	0	4	0	19	1
Newcastle United	1970–71	First Division	14	0	1	0	0	0	0	0	15	0
Newcastle United	1971–72	First Division	8	0	0	0	1	0	3	0	12	0
Newcastle United	1972–73	First Division	3	1	0	0	0	0	1	0	4	1
Newcastle United	Total		56	2	1	0	2	0	9	0	68	2
Sunderland	1972–73	Second Division	15	0	6	1	0	0	0	0	21	1
Sunderland	1973–74	Second Division	17	1	2	0	1	0	3	0	23	1
Sunderland	1974–75	Second Division	34	0	0	0	1	0	3	0	38	0
Sunderland	Total		66	1	8	1	2	0	6	0	82	2
Career total			122	3	9	1	4	0	15	0	150	4

== Honours ==
Sunderland

- FA Cup: 1972–73
