= Chris Guthrie =

English footballer

Personal information
- Full name: Christopher William Guthrie
- Date of birth: 7 September 1953 (age 73)
- Place of birth: Hexham, England
- Height: 6 ft 2 in (1.88 m)
- Position: Forward

Senior career*
Years	Team	Apps	(Gls)
1971–1972	Newcastle United	3	(0)
1972–1975	Southend United	108	(35)
1975–1977	Sheffield United	60	(15)
1977–1978	Swindon Town	45	(12)
1978–1980	Fulham	50	(15)
1980–1981	Millwall	7	(1)
1982	Witney Town		
1983	Trowbridge Town		
1983	Willem II	9	(3)
1983–1985	Roda JC	32	(9)
1984–1985	→ Seiko SA (loan)		
1985	Blyth Spartans		
1985	Helmond Sport		
1986–1987	Ashington		
Total		314	(90)
- * Club domestic league appearances and goals

Christopher William Guthrie (born 7 September 1953) is an English former professional footballer who played as a forward. He is best known for playing in the Football League with Newcastle United, Southend United, Sheffield United, Swindon Town, Fulham and Millwall, and in the Eredivisie with Willem II and Roda JC.

== Career ==
Guthrie was born in Hexham on 7 September 1953. He was given a league debut for Newcastle United in a 1–0 home defeat to Manchester United in October 1971, and made three league appearances for Newcastle in total.

He signed for Third Division club Southend United in November 1972 for a fee of around £10,000, rejecting transfer interest from Chesterfield. In his first season with Southend he scored 15 goals in 25 matches and in his second season, he was voted as the club's Player of the Year.

He transferred to Sheffield United in spring 1975 for a fee of £100,000, with Terry Nicholl going the other way as part of the deal. However he was transfer listed by Sheffield United in February 1977, having been "written off as an expensive failure" by the club, and he signed for Swindon Town in July 1977 for £30,000, having scored 15 goals in 60 league games for Sheffield United.

He made 45 league appearances for Swindon, and scoerd 12 goals, before changing clubs again just over a year after joining Swindon, when he signed for Fulham for a fee of £70,000 in September 1978.

He joined Third Division promotion chasing club Millwall in March 1980, and scored once in seven league games, before suffering a groin injury the following month that he would not return from until summer 1981. However, Guthrie was unable to return to playing professionally, as Millwall had declared Guthrie unfit to play and collected insurance money over his transfer from Fulham. He joined Witney Town in March 1982, and by January 1983 he was playing for Trowbridge Town.

As Guthrie was unable to continue a professional career in England, he signed for Dutch Eredivisie club Willem II in March 1983. He stood out in his short spell with the club, being praised for his aerial ability, with coach Jan Brouwer describing Guthrie as unbeatable in the air. He scored three times in nine Eredivisie matches for the club.

With Willem II unable to afford to retain Guthrie, he transferred to Roda JC in June 1983 for an undisclosed fee, signing a two-year contract with the club. He scored nine times in 32 Eredivisie matches for the club, before transferring to Hong Kong based Seiko SA in November 1984, on a loan until the end of the season. Upon leaving the club, Roda JC manager claimed that it was unlikely that Guthrie would return to the club, with his contract due to expire at the end of the season, whilst Guthrie stated that he had "developed a huge dislike for the people who call themselves Roda supporters". He was briefly contracted to Blyth Spartans in summer 1985, before he signed for Dutch club Helmond Sport in September 1985, on a contract until the end of the season, but he left the club in December, having failed to establish himself as a regular starter.

In May 1986, it was announced that he would join Ashington as both a player and commercial manager. He retired through injury by summer 1987. Towards the end of his playing career he took up modelling part-time. He later became a kit man at Newcastle United.

== Personal life ==
He is the brother of fellow footballer Ron Guthrie, who played as a full back for Newcastle United and Sunderland, and father of footballer Simon Guthrie who played non-League football.
