= Senator Guthrie =

Senator Guthrie may refer to:

== Members of the Australian Senate ==
- James Francis Guthrie (1872–1958), senator for Victoria
- Robert Storrie Guthrie (1857–1921), senator for South Australia

== United States state senate members ==
- Brett Guthrie (born 1964), Kentucky State Senate
- Brian Guthrie fl. 2020s), Oklahoma State Senate
- James Guthrie (Kentucky politician) (1792–1869), Kentucky State Senate
- Jim Guthrie (politician) (born 1955), Idaho State Senate
