= Priscilla Guthrie =

American government official

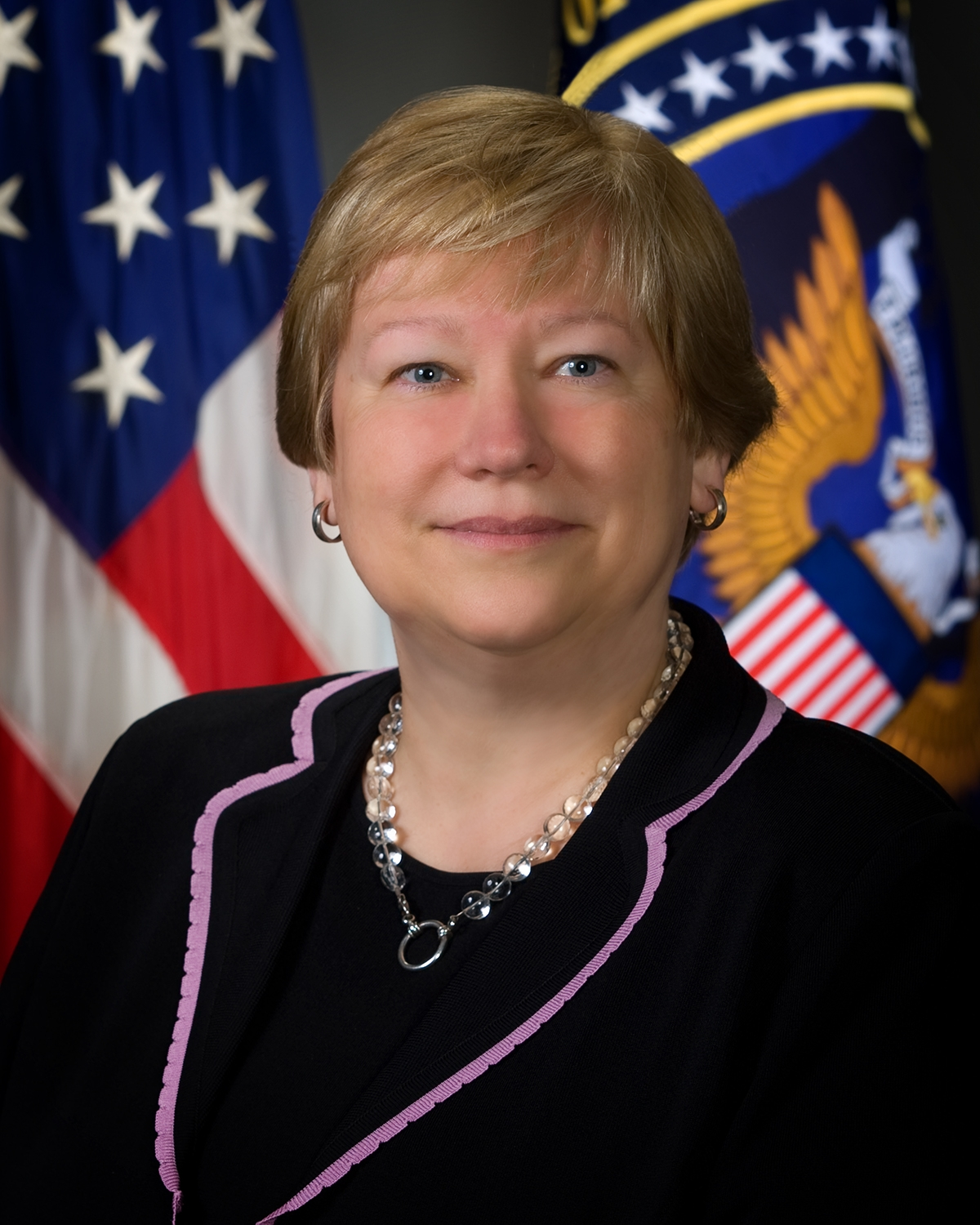

Associate Director of National Intelligence and Chief Information Officer (IC CIO)
- In office May 26, 2009 – November 10, 2010
- President: Barack Obama
- Preceded by: Patrick Gorman (acting)
- Succeeded by: Charlene Leubecker (acting)

Personal details
- Born: United States

Priscilla Guthrie is an American government official. She joined the Office of the Director of National Intelligence (ODNI) as the Intelligence Community (IC) Chief Information Officer on May 26, 2009. She was previously Director of the Information Technology and Systems Division of the Institute for Defense Analyses, a non-profit corporation that administers three federally funded research and development centers to provide objective analyses of national security issues. From 2001 to 2006, she served as Deputy Assistant Secretary of Defense (Deputy Chief Information Officer) at the Department of Defense, where she was responsible for information support to deployed forces. Prior to her position at the Pentagon, Ms. Guthrie was a Vice President of TRW Inc., where she established and led a small, global unit responsible for driving new IT technology into the company's business. She also served in several other positions at TRW, Inc. during her career. Ms. Guthrie holds a B.S. from Pennsylvania State University and an M.B.A. from Marymount College.

She resigned as IC-CIO on November 19, 2010.

Government offices
Preceded by Patrick Gorman (acting)	Associate Director of National Intelligence and Chief Information Officer; 2009–2010	Succeeded by Charlene Leubecker (acting)
