= Alexander Guthrie =

Scottish merchant (1796–1865)

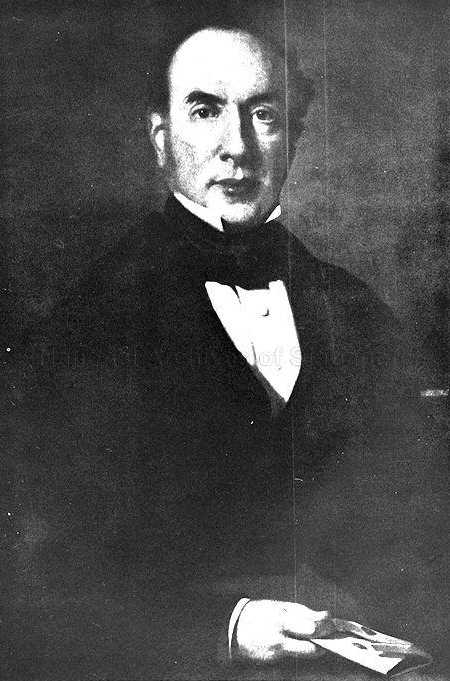
- Guthrie in 1821
- Born: 1796
- Died: 1865 (aged 68–69)
- Occupation: Merchant

Alexander Guthrie (30 December 1796 – 1865) was a Scottish merchant and the co-founder, alongside Thomas Talbot Harrington, of Guthrie & Co. Guthrie was important in the commercial development of Singapore.
