= Guthrie (company) =

Defunct Singaporean-Malaysian conglomerate (1821–2007)

Kumpulan Guthrie Berhad
- Type: Public limited company
- Industry: Plantation, Property, Manufacturing & Others
- Founded: 1821
- Defunct: 2007
- Successor: Sime Darby
- Headquarters: Kuala Lumpur, Malaysia
- Key people: Wan Mohd. Zahid Mohd Noordin, Chairman; Abd Wahab Maskan, Group Chief Executive
- Number of employees: 46,759
- Parent: Permodalan Nasional Berhad
- Website: http://www.simedarby.com

Guthrie Group Limited (Malay: Kumpulan Guthrie Berhad) was a Singaporean-Malaysian company that primarily dealt with plantations. It merged with three other plantation groups to form the world's largest plantation company with the name of Sime Darby Berhad.

Guthrie was founded in Singapore in 1821 by Alexander Guthrie as the first British trading company in Southeast Asia. Guthrie introduced rubber and oil palm in Malaysia in 1896 and 1924, respectively.

== Early history ==
Alexander Guthrie was born in the parish of Menmuir in Angus, Scotland, in 1796, son of David Guthrie of Burnside and his wife Margaret Guthrie, née Guthrie. He went to Singapore in 1821 to set up a trading branch of Thomas Talbot Harrington and Company. Guthrie parted company with Harrington in 1823, and his company was renamed Guthrie and Company in 1833. He retired in 1847, handing the firm over to his nephew James Guthrie, and retired to London, where he died unmarried in 1865. James Guthrie was born in Tannadice in Angus in 1814, the son of Alexander's brother David and his wife, Katharine Grant. James arrived in Singapore in 1829 and became a partner in 1837. In 1846, he married Susan Scott, a distant cousin, and had two daughters and a son before Susan's death in Singapore in 1853. James left Singapore in 1856 and returned to Britain. He retired from the firm in 1876 and died in 1900. Other partners included James' nephew by marriage, John James Greenshields, whose mother Margaret Lyall Scott was the sister of Susan Scott. Greenshields was born in Liverpool in 1823 and died there in 1873. Another was James Guthrie's brother-in-law Thomas Scott, born in Dun, Angus in 1832 and died in Angus in 1902, who became a partner in 1857 and senior partner in 1867.

== Acquisition by Malaysia ==
In 1981, the group became a wholly Malaysian-owned company after Ismail Mohamed Ali, Khalid Ibrahim, Tengku Razaleigh Hamzah and Raja Mohar engineered a raid to take over the group at the London Stock Exchange. The takeover allowed Malaysia to return ownership of some 200,000 acres (800 km^{2}) of agricultural land back to Malaysians. Khalid Ibrahim, CEO of Permodalan Nasional Berhad later became the CEO of the Guthrie, later known as Kumpulan Guthrie Bhd, from 1995 to 2003.

Guthrie Group was made a public company in 1987 and was subsequently listed on the Kuala Lumpur Stock Exchange (KLSE) in 1989 in what was then the largest public issue in Malaysia.

As of 1993, Guthrie had about 110,398 hectares of land, with 19,500 hectares for rubber plantations and 1,481 hectares reserved for development. Its land bank was the largest in Malaysia.

Guthrie owned a corridor of estates in Selangor, named the "Guthrie Corridor", totaling 4,706 hectares. The corridor comprised four estates, from Bukit Jelutong in Shah Alam to Lagong in Rawang. It also owned Haron Estate in Klang, and a piece of land in Gurun, Kedah.

In 1996, Guthrie began moving to property development as its new core business. Some of its estates became property land, with Bukit Jelutong becoming an integrated township and Lagong becoming a satellite city. Guthrie also planned to build a 30 km-long expressway along the corridor, which became the Guthrie Corridor Expressway.

In 1997, Guthrie began installing central monitoring systems – an electronic alarm system linking each house with a police station – on its houses and commercial buildings, including the Guthrie Corridor.

== Merger with Sime Darby ==
With the government investment company Pemodalan Nasional Berhad being the largest single shareholder, the government merged Guthrie with Sime Darby and Golden Hope plantation to form a new entity named Synergy Drive, later renamed Sime Darby. All Guthrie shares were de-listed on 1 November 2007 and re-listed on 30 November 2007.

== Later activities ==
The group's main activities are plantation and property management. The official trading name of Guthrie is Kumpulan Guthrie Berhad. Guthrie Group has plantation estates in Peninsular Malaysia and Sabah, and northern Sumatra and West Kalimantan (Borneo) in Indonesia. The group is also engaged in real estate (with the formation of Guthrie Properties in 1994) and manufacturing.

== See also ==
- Tanjong Pagar Dock Company
