= Mary Jane Guthrie =

American zoologist

Mary Jane Guthrie (December 13, 1895 – February 22, 1975) was an American zoologist and cytologist known for her studies of cytoplasm in reproductive and endocrine cells.

== Early life and education ==
Guthrie was born in New Bloomfield, Missouri. She graduated from the University of Missouri with a bachelor's degree in 1916 and a master's degree in 1918, then earned her Ph.D. in zoology at Bryn Mawr College in 1922. While working towards her Ph.D., Guthrie served as a zoology instructor and demonstrator.

== Career and research ==
Returning to Missouri after earning her Ph.D., Guthrie spent the majority of her career at her alma mater, becoming an assistant professor in 1922, associate professor in 1927, and full professor in 1937. Guthrie was known for her writing about zoology; she wrote several textbooks on the subject that were widely used. Guthrie left the University of Missouri for Wayne State University in Detroit in 1950, and stayed there until her 1960 retirement; in 1951 she was given a concurrent appointment at the Detroit Institute for Cancer Research. She cultured ovarian tissue in vitro, a significant achievement at the time, and used her cultures to study ovarian cancer.

Despite her success, Guthrie was denied funding because of her gender, including one instance where she was not funded by the Rockefeller Foundation.

== Honors and awards ==
Professional memberships:

- American Society of Zoologists
- American Association of Anatomists
- Genetics Society of America
- American Association of Mammalogists
- Tissue Culture Association

Fellowships and awards:

- Fellow, American Association for the Advancement of Science
- Fellow, American Society of Naturalists
- Editor, Journal of Morphology (1944-1947)

== Works ==
- General Zoology, John Wiley & Sons Incorporated, 1963
- Zoology, Wiley, 1957
- Laboratory Directions in General Zoölogy, BiblioBazaar, 2011, ISBN 9781178816655
