= William Dameron Guthrie =

American lawyer

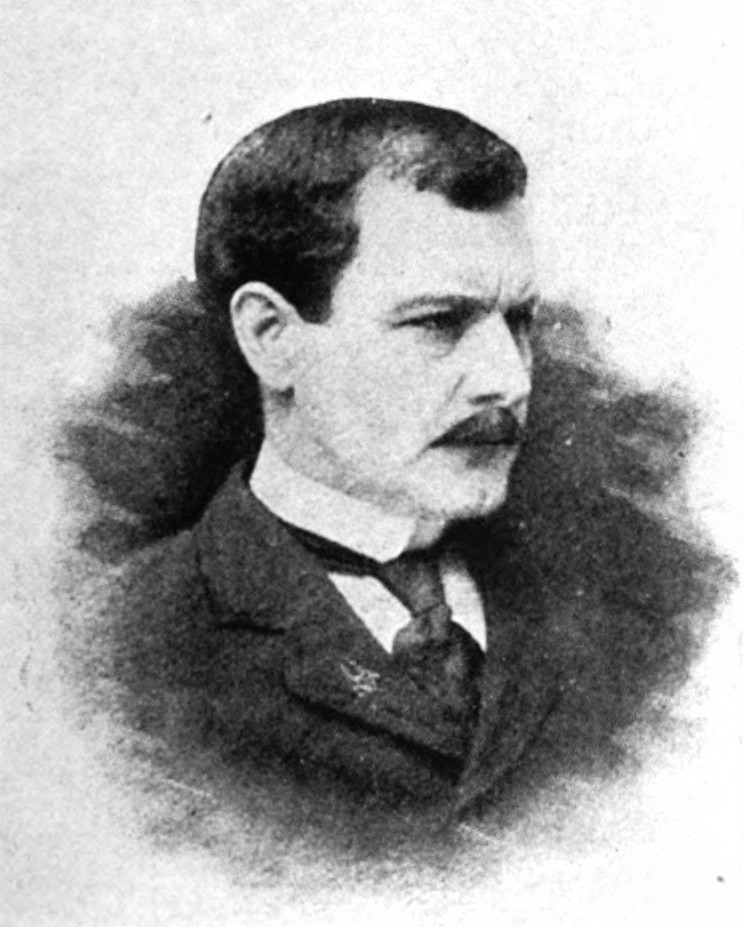
- Born: February 3, 1859; San Francisco, California
- Died: December 8, 1935 (aged 76); Lattingtown, New York
- Resting place: Locust Valley Cemetery, Locust Valley, New York, U.S.
- Education: Columbia Law School
- Occupations: Lawyer, educator
- Political party: Republican
- Spouse: Ella E. Fuller (m. 1889)

William Dameron Guthrie (1859–1935) was an American lawyer and educator.

== Biography ==
William Dameron Guthrie was born in San Francisco, California on February 3, 1859. He was educated in Paris, in England, and at the Columbia Law School (1879–80). In his practice before the United States Supreme Court he argued the income tax, California irrigation, Illinois inheritance tax, oleomargarine, and Kansas City stockyards rate cases. He was a William L. Storrs lecturer at Yale University in 1907-08 and was Ruggles Professor of Constitutional Law at Columbia University from 1909 to 1922. Besides his contributions to periodicals on legal and political subjects, he was author of Lectures on the Fourteenth Amendment to the Constitution (1898), Introduction to American Constitutional Law (1913) and Magna Carta and Other Addresses (1916, Columbia University Press, NY).

Guthrie served as president of the Association of the Bar of the City of New York from 1925 to 1927. Guthrie also served as a lawyer to the Rockefeller family.

He married Ella E. Fuller in New York City on May 12, 1889.

A Republican, he was elected the first mayor of Lattingtown, New York in 1931, and reelected in 1934.

William Dameron Guthrie died at his home in Lattingtown on December 8, 1935. He was buried at Locust Valley Cemetery.
