= Frederick Guthrie (scientist) =

British physicist and chemist (1833–1886)

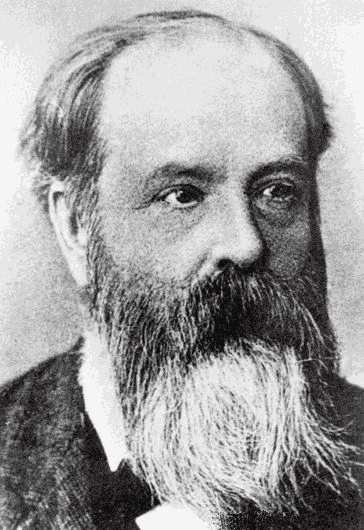
- Born: 15 October 1833; Bayswater, London, England
- Died: 21 October 1886 (aged 53); London, England
- Known for: Eutectic system Mustard gas Thermionic emission Thermionic diode
- Awards: FRS (1871)
- Scientific career
- Academic advisors: Augustus De Morgan; Hermann Kolbe

Frederick Guthrie FRS FRSE (15 October 1833 – 21 October 1886) was a British physicist, chemist, and academic author.

He was the son of Alexander Guthrie, a London tradesman, and the younger brother of mathematician Francis Guthrie. Along with William Fletcher Barrett he founded the Physical Society of London (now the Institute of Physics) in 1874 and was president of the society from 1884 until 1886. He believed that science should be based on experimentation rather than discussion.

== Academic career ==
His academic career started at University College, London, where he studied for three years. He studied chemistry under Thomas Graham and Alexander William Williamson and mathematics under Augustus De Morgan. In 1852, he submitted his brother Francis's observations on the four-color map problem to De Morgan.

In 1854 Guthrie went to Heidelberg to study under Robert Bunsen and then in 1855 obtained a PhD at the University of Marburg under Adolph Wilhelm Hermann Kolbe.

In 1856 he joined Edward Frankland, professor of chemistry at Owens College, Manchester. In 1859 he went to the University of Edinburgh.

Guthrie synthesized mustard gas in 1860 from ethylene and sulfur dichloride. Guthrie was probably not the first to synthesize mustard gas, but he was among the first to document its toxic effects. Guthrie did his mustard gas synthesis at almost the same time as Albert Niemann, who also synthesized mustard gas and noted its toxic effects in his own experiments. Both Guthrie and Niemann published their findings on 1 January 1860.

In 1860 Guthrie was elected a Fellow of the Royal Society of Edinburgh, his proposer being Lyon Playfair. He was elected a Fellow of the Royal Society of London in 1871.

He served as professor of chemistry and physics at the Royal College of Mauritius between 1861 and 1867.

Guthrie was later a professor at the Royal School of Mines in London, where he mentored the future experimental physicist C. V. Boys. He also mentored John Ambrose Fleming and was instrumental in turning his interest from chemistry to electricity.

He invented the thermionic diode 1873 (for which alternate credit was sometimes later given to Edison's assistant W. J. Hammer) and coined the term eutectic in 1884.

Guthrie wrote Elements of Heat in 1868 and Magnetism and Electricity in 1873 (published in 1876).

Guthrie was also a linguist, playwright, and poet. Under the name Frederick Cerny, he wrote the poems The Jew (1863) and Logrono (1877).

Guthrie died in 1886 and is buried in Kensal Green Cemetery in London.

== Family ==
He was married four times. His son, Frederick Bickell Guthrie, was an agricultural chemist.
