= John T. Guthrie =

American literacy researcher

John Taylor Guthrie
- Education: Westtown School, Earlham College, College of Education at the University of Illinois Urbana-Champaign
- Occupations: researcher and scholar
- Known for: area of student motivation as it relates to literacy
- Notable work: see Publications
- Awards: see Awards and honors

John Taylor Guthrie is a researcher and scholar in the area of student motivation as it relates to literacy.

== Education ==
Guthrie attended Westtown School. He received his bachelor's degree in psychology from Earlham College in 1964, where he also spent a year abroad at the University of London. He earned both h is master's and doctoral degrees from the College of Education at the University of Illinois Urbana-Champaign, where he majored in educational psychology, completing his Ph.D. in 1968. While attending the University of Illinois Urbana-Champaign, Guthrie worked as a research assistant from 1964 to 1968.

== Career ==
Guthrie began his post-doctoral career as an assistant professor of education and project director of the Center for Social Organization of Schools at Johns Hopkins University from 1968 to 1970, after which he moved into the role of assistant professor of pediatrics at Johns Hopkins until 1974.

His stint at Johns Hopkins was followed by a decade (1974–1984) as the director of research for the International Reading Association (IRA). During this time, he also held an adjunct position at the University of Delaware.

In 1984, Guthrie moved to the University of Maryland at College Park. From 1984 to 1991, he served as the director of the Center for Educational Research and Development and as a professor in the Department of Curriculum and Instruction.

In 1992, Guthrie moved to the College Park campus of the University of Maryland, where he served as a professor of human development in the college of education, a position he held until his retirement in 2007. While at the University of Maryland, Guthrie was named the first Jean Mullan Professor of Literacy for 2006–2007.

In 1992, Guthrie also became the co-director of the National Reading Research Center at the University of Maryland, College Park, a role he retained until his retirement in 1997.

== CORI (concept-oriented reading instruction) ==
The Concept-Oriented Reading Instruction (CORI) framework integrates the science (or social studies) into literacy instruction, using activities and content-area reading to motivate students to read, write, and think more deeply. His research indicates greater gains in motivation, engagement, and reading achievement for students exposed to the CORI framework as opposed to control groups.

== The engagement model of reading comprehension ==
This model, a result of joint effort between Dr. Guthrie and Allan Wigfield, "proposes that engagement in reading is the joint functioning of motivational processes and cognitive strategies during reading comprehension."

== Awards and honors ==
- Kennedy Scholar in Education, Johns Hopkins University, 1970–1974
- Visiting Scholar, University of Auckland, New Zealand, January–May, 1980
- Board of Directors, National Reading Conference, 1980–1983
- Fellow, American Psychological Association (Division 15), 1981
- Delegate, United States Department of Education Study Group to China, 1984
- Steering Committee International Literary Survey, International Association for the Evaluation of Educational Achievement, 1985–90
- Fellow, American Psychological Association, 1990
- Fellow, National Council of Research in English, 1992
- Oscar S. Causey Award for outstanding contributions to reading research, 1992
- National Reading Conference Chair, Fellows Committee, Educational Psychology, Division 15, American Psychological Association, 1993–95
- International Reading Association - Elected to the "Reading Hall of Fame", 1994
- National Academy of Sciences—National Research Council 1996–1999
- University of Maryland Regent's Faculty Award for research/scholarship/creative activity, 2004
- University of Illinois, Distinguished Alumni Award, 2006
- University of Maryland, College of Education Scholarship Award, 2006
- University of Maryland, Inaugural Jean Mullan Professor of Literacy, 2006–2008
- Fellow, American Educational Research Association (AERA Fellows Program), 2008
- Elected to the National Academy of Education (NAEd), 2011

== Collaborators and co-authors ==
- Allan Wigfield

== Publications ==
=== Books (authored or co-authored) ===
- Guthrie, J. T. & Siefert, M. (1984). Measuring readership: Rationale and technique. Paris: Unesco. (English, Spanish, French).

=== Books (edited) ===
- Guthrie J. T. (Ed.). (1976). Aspects of reading acquisition. Baltimore, Maryland: Johns Hopkins University Press.
- Guthrie, J. T. (Ed.). (1977). Cognition, curriculum, and comprehension. Newark, Delaware: International Reading Association.
- Guthrie, J. T. (Ed.). (1983). Comprehension and teaching: Research reviews. Newark, Delaware: International Reading Association.
- Guthrie, J. T. (Ed.). (1984). "Reading" by William S. Gray: A research retrospective, 1881–1941. Newark, Delaware: International Reading Association.

=== Books (co-edited) ===
- Pressley, M., Harris, K., & Guthrie, J. (Eds.). (1992). Promoting academic competence and literacy in school. San Diego: Academic.
- Guthrie, J. T., & Wigfield, A. (Eds.). (1997). Reading engagement: Motivating readers through integrated instruction. Newark, Delaware: International Reading Association.
- Guthrie, J. T., & Alvermann, D. E. (Eds.). (1999). Engaged reading: Processes, practices, and policy implications. New York: Teachers College Press.
- Baker, L., Dreher, M. J., & Guthrie, J. T. (Eds.). (2000). Engaging young readers. New York: Guilford.
- Guthrie, J. T., Wigfield, A., & Perencevich, K. C. (Ed.). (2004). Motivating reading comprehension: Concept-Oriented Reading Instruction. Mahwah, New Jersey: Erlbaum.
- Guthrie, J. T. (2008). Engaging adolescents in reading. Thousand Oaks, California: Corwin Press.
- Guthrie, J. T., Wigfield, A., & Klauda, S. L. (2012). Adolescents' engagement in academic literacy (Report No. 7). Retrieved November 10, 2012 from www.corilearning.com/research-publications
