= Donald Guthrie (physician) =

American surgeon

Dr. Donald Guthrie
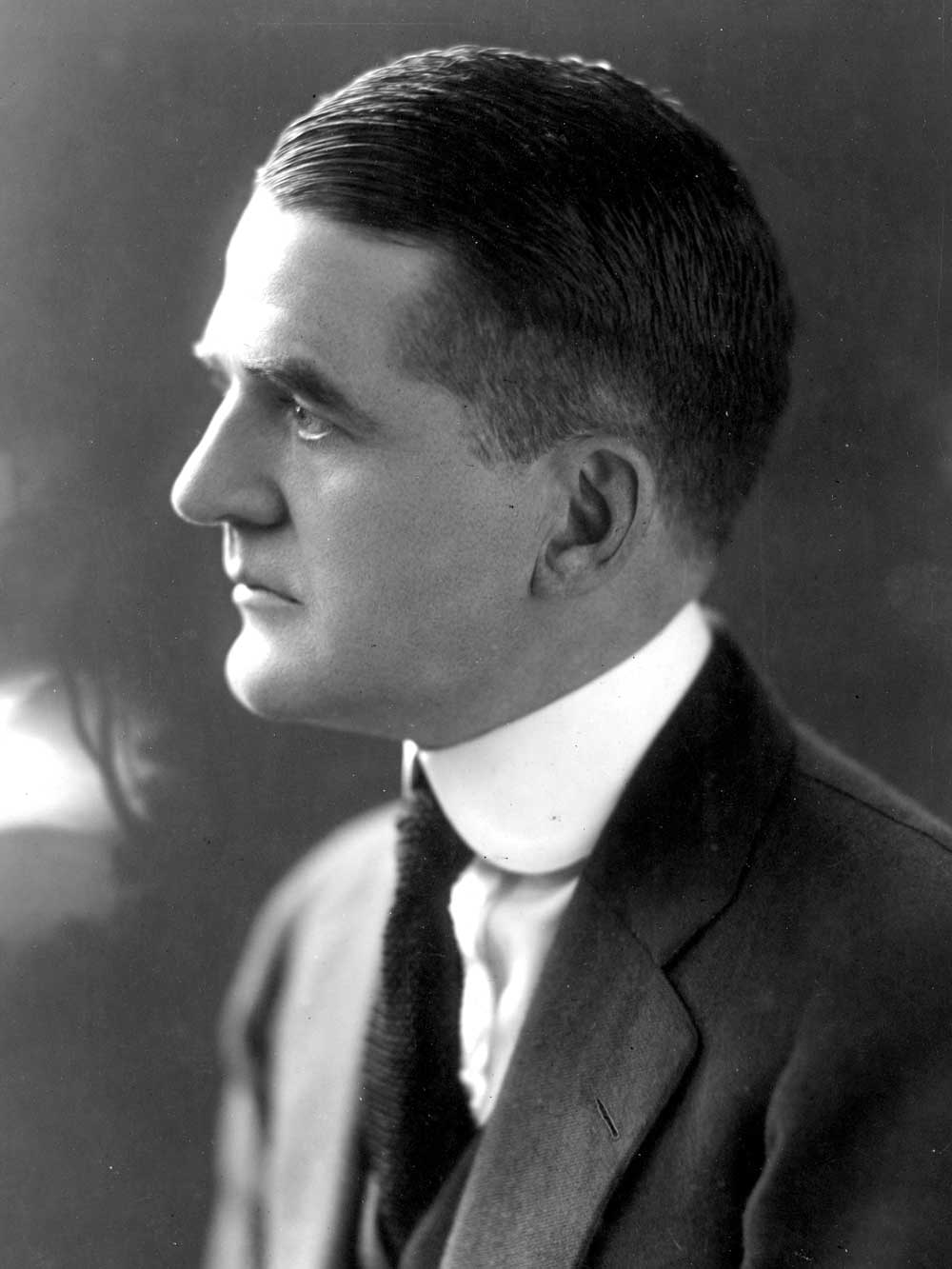
- Born: June 23, 1880; Wilkes-Barre, Pennsylvania, U.S.
- Died: October 30, 1958 (aged 78)
- Spouse: Emily Franklin Baker
- Parent(s): George Guthrie; Sarah Hollenback

Dr. Donald Guthrie (June 23, 1880 – October 30, 1958) was an American surgeon best known for establishing Guthrie Clinic in Sayre, Pennsylvania in 1910. One of nation's earliest multi-specialty group medical practices, Guthrie based the formation of the clinic that bears his name on the principles he learned while a surgical resident (1906 - 1909) at Mayo Clinic, Rochester, Minnesota.

== Early life ==
Guthrie was born into a prominent family in Wilkes-Barre, Pennsylvania. His father, George W. Guthrie, MD, was a physician and surgeon in Northeast Pennsylvania. His mother, Sarah Hollenbeck Wright Guthrie, was from a pioneering industrial family, tracing her ancestry to Matthias Hollenback, one of the oldest families in Bradford County, Pennsylvania. Donald Guthrie received his early education in schools in Wilkes-Barre; received a degree in philosophy from Yale University in 1901; followed by a medical degree in 1905 from the University of Pennsylvania School of Medicine. After Guthrie's death, a "Donald Guthrie Professorship in Surgery" was created in his honor at both Yale University and the University of Pennsylvania.

== Group practice model ==
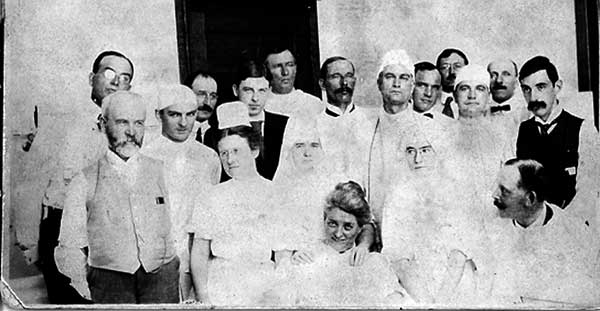
In this photograph taken at Mayo Clinic, Guthrie is third from the right. Beside him, also in surgical attire, is Dr. William Mayo; Dr. E. Star Judd is third from left.

After serving a year and a half at the University of Pennsylvania Hospital as an intern, Guthrie went to Rochester, Minnesota, where for three years and four months (1906 - 1909) he was a member of the staff of physicians and surgeons as a resident working alongside Charles Horace Mayo, William James Mayo (sons of William Worrall Mayo), and E. Starr Judd, early pioneers of the medical group practice model being developed at Mayo. Guthrie was the first "Easterner" to be formally trained at Mayo performed and assisted in nearly 4,000 operations while at Mayo. The benefits to patients of a group practice that Guthrie learned under the tutelage of William and Charles Mayo had a profound effect on him. Those values of putting the needs of the patient first, teamwork, and excellence in patient care, became the foundation of the group practice that bears his name. These values continue to guide Guthrie Clinic today.

== Rural medicine ==
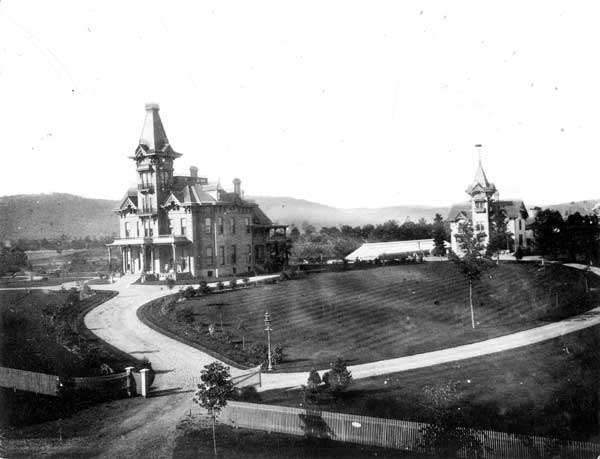
Robert Packer Hospital was named after Robert Asa Packer

Guthrie was recommended to serve as Superintendent and Surgeon-in-Chief of Robert Packer Hospital, Sayre, Pennsylvania in November 1909, and arrived in Sayre to assume charge of the hospital on January 10, 1910. At that time Sayre was a small town in a rural area. The primary industry was the Lehigh Valley Railroad repair yard, known as the "Big Shops," one of the largest such facilities in the world at one time, employing thousands of men. The town was named in honor of Robert Heysham Sayre (1824–1907) who was vice president and chief engineer of the Lehigh Valley Railroad. The area's only hospital, named in memory of Robert Asa Packer (son of Asa Packer), established in 1885 had 10 beds at the time Guthrie was named to his post.

Guthrie chose to start his career in just such a small town. As he stated in his remarks upon being honored by the Borough of Sayre on, September 28, 1957, "I accepted the position at the hospital upon the advice of my father, because he pointed out that I could have complete charge of a small hospital in a small town and could carry out the staff organization that I had learned at the Mayo Clinic."

== Building a group practice ==
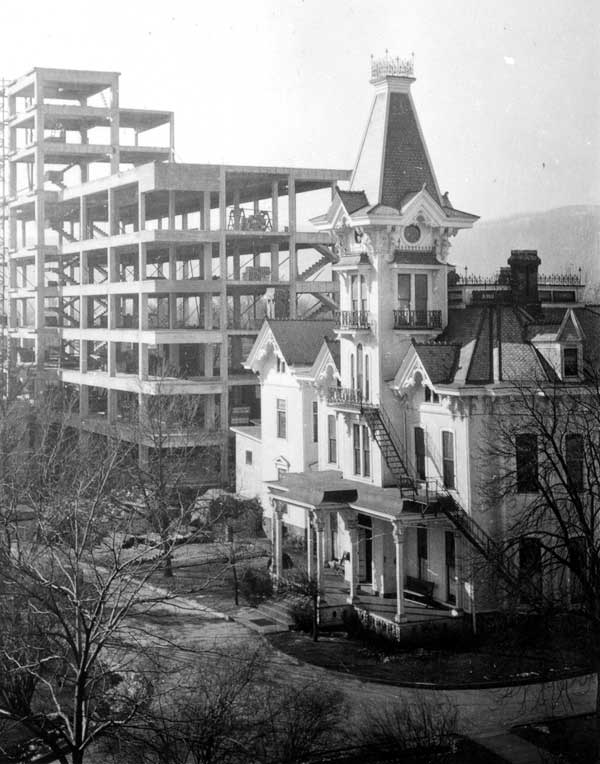
Robert Packer Hospital Reconstruction

One of Guthrie's first acts at the small hospital was to appoint an associate and an X-ray technician, to join an intern already on staff. He established the Ear, Eye Nose and Throat department in 1912, followed in 1913 by the Pathological department, and later the Urological and Medical departments. For the first few years Guthrie was also responsible for all of the non-medical activities of the hospital, including collecting money, paying wages, and ordering food. In 1912 Howard E. Bishop was appointed as hospital Superintendent, relieving Guthrie of those duties.

In Guthrie's report to the hospital Board of Directors in 1912, he stated, "The board has been wise to increase the size of the staff, I hope in the future, and I am confident that it will be but a short time, before we will be prepared to give the patient the benefit of a grouped diagnosis. The sciences of medicine and surgery are far too broad for any one man to master." The number of private rooms grew when an annex was added to the hospital in 1914, and in 1915 a new operating pavilion, children's ward and additional private rooms were added.

Guthrie's efforts to build a group practice associated with a well-regarded hospital continued to be successful, even through difficult and stressful times. During World War I, Guthrie had been given a commission in Base Hospital No. 26 - the Mayo Unit - but the Robert Packer Hospital Board of Trustees asked he be deferred so he could stay to treat patients at their facility. Five other physicians and many nurses did go abroad.

As WW I was ending, Sayre, like many other communities across the country, was impacted by the 1918 flu pandemic. Despite the fact that a number of physicians and nurses were ill, the staff carried on admirably. According to the 1919 Hospital Annual Report, "During the 1918 epidemic of influenza, the Hospital did splendid work caring for over 300 cases of the disease."

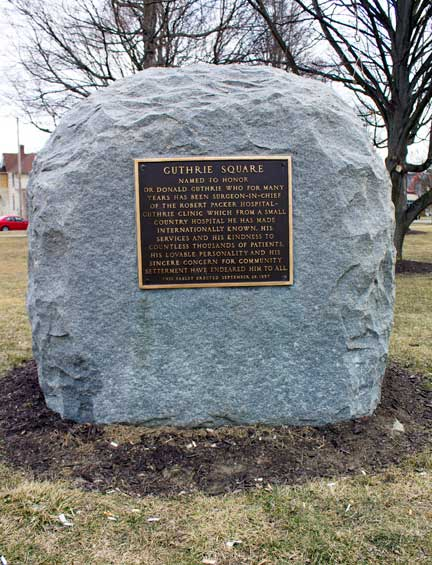
Guthrie was honored by the Sayre Borough Council. Plaque located at Howard Elmer Park in Sayre.

The hospital also suffered a devastating fire in 1933, which destroyed an entire wing. There were no deaths and the hospital continued to function, caring for all its displaced patients. The hospital Board of Trustees met the following day and voted to start construction of a new facility. The new seven-story building opened the next year.

None of these obstacles stood in the way of Guthrie's plans to provide the medical care to the people of the region. By the mid-1920s patient demand and numbers of staff had grown to the point that current facilities were inadequate. As the hospital grew, Guthrie also led numerous efforts to develop the facilities he felt his staff required to provide the best patient care, including a new nurses' residence, built in 1926. In 1928 the hospital constructed a physician office building for the growing staff, and named it Guthrie Clinic in honor of Guthrie. The following decades saw continued growth as the reputations of Guthrie, his staff and the hospital gained regional and national attention.

By the time of his death in 1958, Guthrie's accomplishments were extensive. The small hospital in a small rural town had been transformed into a medical campus with a growing multi-specialty group practice of 42 physicians and surgeons, 26 residents and fellows, a research foundation, and a hospital of 340 beds with internship and residency programs.

In recognition of his contributions to the health and well-being of those he served, Guthrie was honored by the Sayre Borough Council when it named the four streets surrounding Howard Elmer Park "Guthrie Square," referring to Guthrie as Sayre's "first citizen."

== Personal life ==
On December 2, 1916, Guthrie married Emily Franklin Baker at the Church of the Heavenly Rest in New York City. Emily, known as "Gerry," to her friends was the daughter of Thomas and Emma Baker and was born in Brooklyn, New York. Because her parents were deceased, she was given in marriage by her uncle Herbert Baker. Mr. Baker was chairman of the Board of the Vacuum Oil Company, which later merged with Socony, or Standard Oil Company of New York, eventually becoming part of Mobil Oil. They had no children.

Mrs. Guthrie survived her husband and continued to be a key financial supporter of Robert Packer Hospital, Guthrie Clinic and the Guthrie Foundation.

== Professional accomplishments ==
Guthrie was one of 13 founding members of the American Board of Surgery, evidence of his commitment to medical education and belief in board certification for physicians. During his term as President of the Pennsylvania State Medical Society, Guthrie started a program of postgraduate teaching for general practitioners in their local communities.

Guthrie traveled and lectured extensively in the U.S. and abroad where he received many honors. He wrote numerous medical articles, as well as articles about hospital care, such as: "The Care of the Patient," presented at Harvard Medical School, February 9, 1939, printed in The New England Journal of Medicine, November 2, 1939; "The Significance of the Seemingly Insignificant," published in the November 1931 issue of The Modern Hospital; and "Hospital Morale," delivered before the Section on Surgery of the Medical Society of the State of Pennsylvania, September 23, 1919.

Honorary degrees: Doctor of Science from LaFayette University *Doctor of Humane Letters from Hahnemann Medical College

Faculty positions: Professor of Surgery, School of Medicine, University of Pennsylvania *Professor of Surgery at Hahnemann Medical College

Awards: Alumni Award of Merit from the General Alumni Society of the University of Pennsylvania in recognition of his outstanding service to the University

Additionally, he was associated with the following organizations:

- Elected a Trustee of the Pennsylvania Medical Society in 1917, named as President in 1933 *President of the Bradford County Medical Society *Member of the American Surgical Society; the Societe Internationale de Chirurgie, the Southern Surgical Society, the Surgical Research Society, the International Society of Surgery, American Goiter Association, American Association for the Surgery of Trauma
- Fellow and member of the Board of Governors of the American College of Surgeons
- Honorary member of the Royal Academy of Medicine of Rome, Royal Medical and Surgical Society of Budapest, the Vienna Surgical Society, and the Society of Medicine and Surgery of Rio de Janeiro.
- Member and President of the Alumni Association of the Mayo Foundation
- Chief Surgeon of the Lehigh Valley Railroad for 29 years; member and past President of the Association of New York and New England Railway Surgeons; member of the Association of Railroad Chief Surgeons
