= Thomas Guthrie (director) =

British director, actor and musician

Thomas Guthrie is an English director, actor, writer, composer, arranger, fiddle player and baritone singer.

Guthrie was born in England. He began singing as a boy under George Guest at St John's College, Cambridge. He then read Classics at Trinity College, Cambridge before winning a scholarship to study at the Royal Northern College of Music, where he won prizes including the Brigitte Fassbaender Award for Lieder, the Schubert Prize, and an English-Speaking Union (ESU) scholarship to study with Thomas Allen in Chicago.

He is the founder and artistic director of the charity Music and Theatre for All (2014-current)

In December of 2013, he Directed Noye’s Fludde, Benjamin Britten Opera, Two Moors Festival in the Presence of The Countess of Wessex

In 2002 he co-directed the Bampton Classical Opera production of Waiting for Figaro.

In 2010, 2011 and 2013 he and Gwyneth Herbert sang in The Playlist, a series of BBC Radio 4 broadcasts recreating the previously unknown musical lives of famous figures from the past, discovering and recording their favourite songs – including songs they themselves had composed.

He directed a critically acclaimed production of Rossini's The Barber of Seville at London's Royal Opera House in 2014.

In early April 2020, in the era of coronavirus, he organised a multi-musician internet recital, with participants singing or playing his arrangement of the ballad "Where Have All The Flowers Gone?" from their homes to raise funds for Help Musicians UK. The result was uploaded to the internet and widely viewed.

He is a regular member of The Alehouse Boys, a project led by Barokksolistene's Bjarte Eike. Recordings include The Alehouse Sessions, The Playhouse Sessions, and Schubert's Die schöne Müllerin, all on Rubicon Classics.
