= Frederick Bickell Guthrie =

Australian agricultural chemist (1861–1927)

Frederick Bickell Guthrie (10 December 1861 – 7 February 1927) was an Australian agricultural chemist and a president of the Royal Society of New South Wales.

== Early life ==
Guthrie was born in Mauritius, to Frederick Guthrie, F.R.S. and Agnes Guthrie, née Bickell. Guthrie was educated at University College, London, and at the University of Marburg under Professor Zincke. He was assistant to the professor of chemistry at Queen's College, Cork, from 1882, and in 1888 became demonstrator in chemistry at the Royal College of Science, London under Sir Thomas Thorpe.

== Career in Australia ==
Guthrie came to Australia in 1890. Guthrie devised methods to test small quantities of grain and assess their quality. For periods in 1896, 1904–1905, and 1908-1909 Guthrie was acting professor of chemistry at the University of Sydney.

== Legacy ==
The Guthrie medal, named in his honour, is awarded every three years by the Royal Australian Chemical Institute.
