= Keith Guthrie (diplomat) =

American diplomat (1936–2010)

Donald Keith Guthrie (June 23, 1936 – March 18, 2010) was an American diplomat who was a career Foreign Service Officer. He served as charge' d'affaires in Belize from July 1985 until September 1987.

== Life and career ==
Guthrie was born on June 23, 1936, and grew up in Las Cruces, New Mexico, with his parents who were professors at New Mexico State University. He attended Las Cruces High School and New Mexico State University. Guthrie graduated from the University of California, Berkeley, and the Fletcher School of Law and Diplomacy. He studied at the University of the Andes as a Fulbright Scholar. Guthrie began his career with the State Department in 1961 and stayed until he retired in 1991.

Guthrie died due to complications from Parkinson's Disease at his home in Albuquerque, New Mexico, on March 18, 2010, at the age of 73.
