= Frank Guthrie (rugby union) =

South Africa international rugby union player

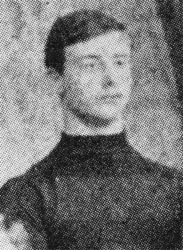
- Born: Frank Edward Huntingdon Guthrie; 3 November 1869 Notting Hill, London, England
- Died: 19 June 1954 (aged 84) Pietermaritzburg, South Africa
- School: Diocesan College

Rugby union career
- Position: Half-back
Amateur team(s)
Years	Team	Apps	(Points)
–	Villager Football Club		
Provincial / State sides
Years	Team	Apps	(Points)
1889–1892	Western Province		
1893–1896	Eastern Province		
International career
Years	Team	Apps	(Points)
1891–96	South Africa	3	(0)

Frank Edward Huntingdon Guthrie (3 November 1869 – 19 June 1954) was an England born South African international rugby union half-back.

== Biography ==
Although born in Notting Hill, London, Guthrie was educated at Diocesan College in Cape Town, where he also played provincial rugby for Western Province. He made his first appearance for South Africa in the 1st Test of Great Britain's 1891 tour, South Africa's first as a Test nation. He was not selected to play in the 2nd Test, but returned to the side for the 3rd match at Newlands Stadium, where Great Britain won to seal a 3–0 series victory. His final match for South Africa was the 1st Test of Great Britain's 1896 tour, an 8–0 South Africa loss. Guthrie died in 1954, in Pietermaritzburg, at the age of 84.

=== Test history ===
No.	Opponents	Results(SA 1st)	Position	Tries	Date	Venue
1.	(United Kingdom) British Isles	0–4	Halfback		30 Jul 1891	Crusaders Ground, Port Elizabeth
2.	(United Kingdom) British Isles	0–4	Halfback		5 Sep 1891	Newlands, Cape Town
3.	(United Kingdom) British Isles	0–8	Halfback		30 Jul 1896	Crusaders Ground, Port Elizabeth

== See also ==
- List of South Africa national rugby union players – Springbok no. 5
