= John Guthrie (cricketer) =

English cricketer

Personal information
- Born: 10 September 1795; Newark, Nottinghamshire, England
- Died: 6 July 1865 (aged 69); Clifton, Bristol

Domestic team information
- Years: Team
- 1819–1820: Cambridge University
- Source: CricketArchive, 31 March 2013

John Guthrie (10 September 1795 – 6 July 1865) was an English cricketer who played for Cambridge University in two matches in 1819, totalling 32 runs with a highest score of 22.

Guthrie was educated at Westminster School and Trinity College, Cambridge. After graduating from Cambridge he became a Church of England priest and after other posts he was vicar of Calne, Wiltshire, from 1835 until his death. In Calne he and his wife founded a local school, the Guthrie School. He was appointed a canon of Bristol Cathedral in 1858 and was the first chairman of council of Bristol's Clifton College, founded in 1862.

== Bibliography ==
- Haygarth, Arthur (1862). Scores & Biographies, Volume 1 (1744–1826). Lillywhite.
