= Keith Guthrie (American football) =

American football player (born 1961)

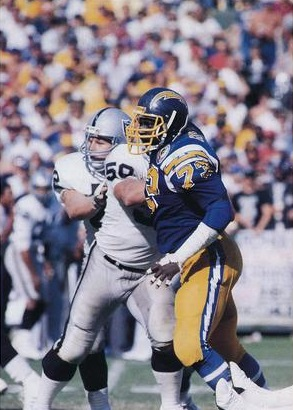
- Guthrie in 1984

No. 73
- Position: Defensive tackle

Personal information
- Born: August 17, 1961 (age 65); Tyler, Texas, U.S.
- Listed height: 6 ft 4 in (1.93 m)
- Listed weight: 264 lb (120 kg)

Career information
- High school: John Tyler (Tyler)
- College: Texas A&M
- NFL draft: 1984: 6th round, 144th overall pick

Career history
- San Diego Chargers (1984); Houston Oilers (1987)*
- * Offseason or practice squad member only

Awards and highlights
- Second-team All-SWC (1983)

Career NFL statistics
- Games played: 11
- Stats at Pro Football Reference

Keith Edwin Guthrie (born August 17, 1961) is an American former professional football player who was a defensive tackle for the San Diego Chargers of the National Football League (NFL) in 1984. He played college football for the Texas A&M Aggies and was selected by the Chargers in the sixth round (144th overall) of the 1984 NFL draft.
