= William Norman Guthrie =

William Norman Guthrie also known as Norman de Lagutry (4 March 1868 – 9 December 1944) was an American clergyman and grandson of famous radical Frances Wright. His father, Eugène Picault de Lagutry, was the husband of Frances Sylva Piquepal d'Arusmont, the daughter of Frances Wright.

== Biography ==
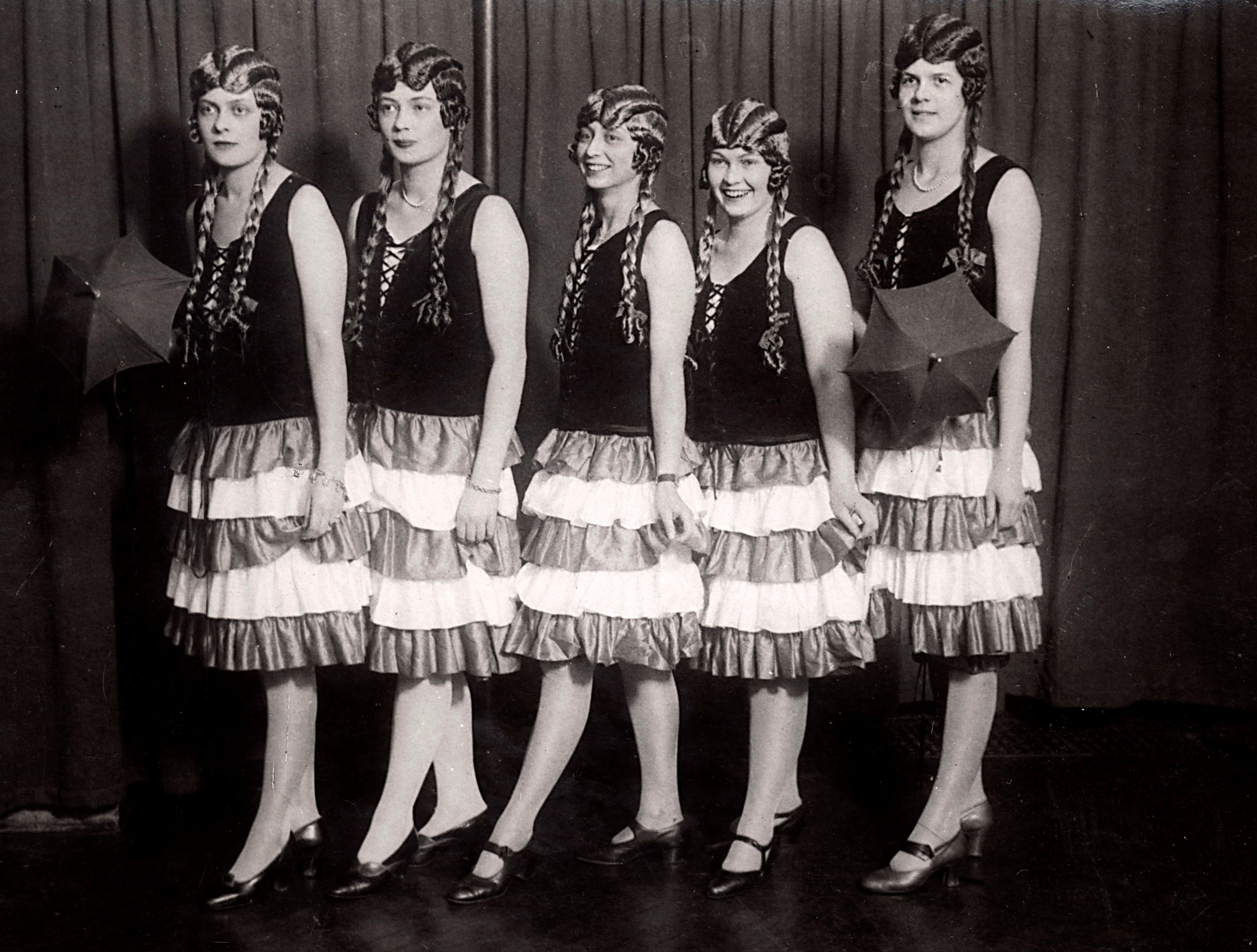
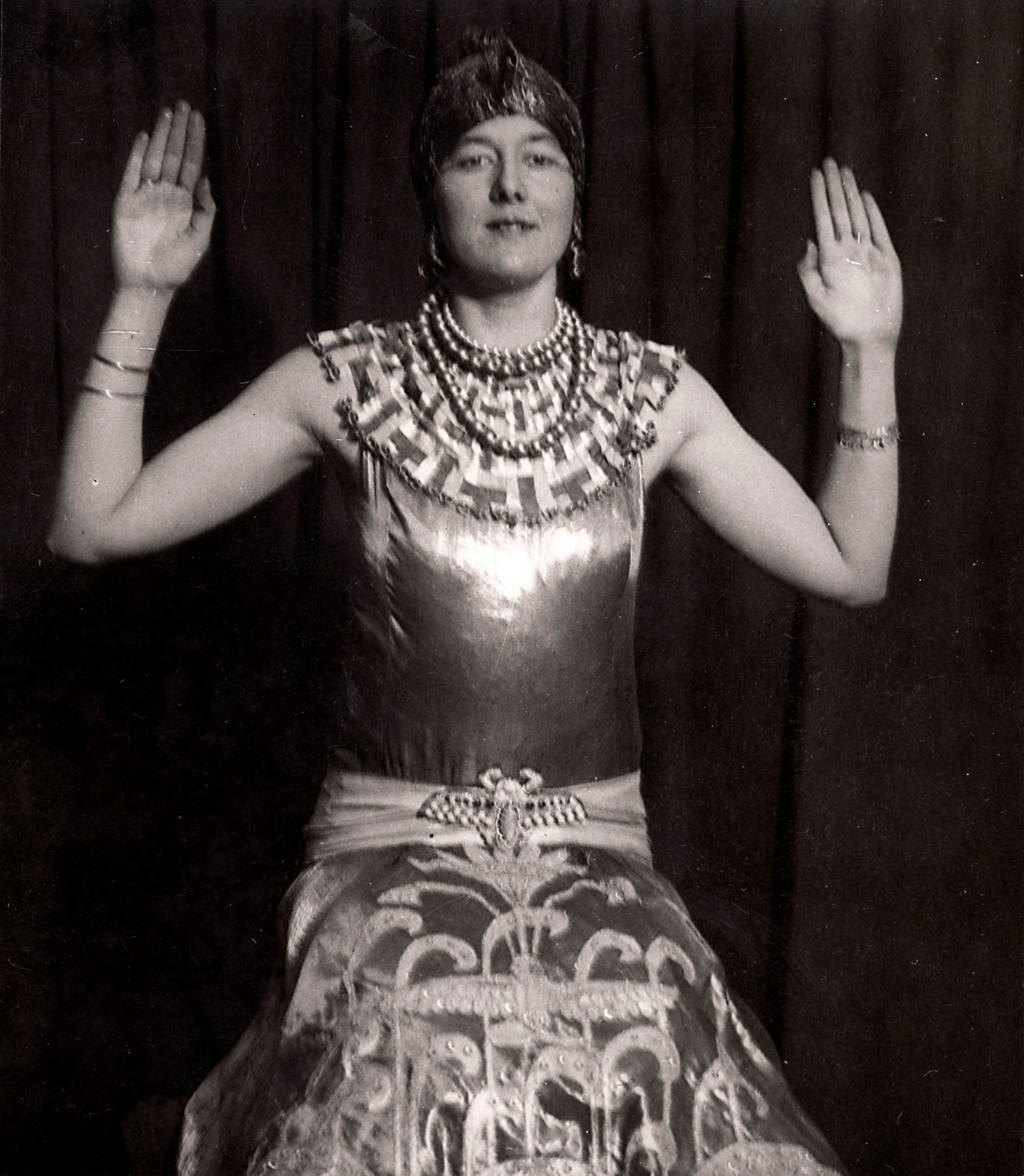
Dancers in Paris portraying the New Testament, 1926

Guthrie was born in Dundee, Scotland. He was educated at the University of the South, and from 1889 to 1910 was lecturer and professor of literature at several universities, including the University of Chicago. From 1911 to 1937, he was rector of the Church of St. Mark's-in-the-Bouwerie, New York City. He attracted attention in the latter part of 1922, by stating that dancers would be trained to interpret religion, and in March, 1923, he held an Egyptian sun-god dance at his church, and from time to time it was announced that certain pagan rites were celebrated there. Bishop Manning asked for an explanation, but was not satisfied of the propriety of the dances, and vetoed them in January, 1924. The rector continued the services, however, and in March, 1924, St. Mark's was deprived of episcopal ministrations pending the time when the Bishop's counsel should be heeded.

== Works ==
- The Old Hemlock And Other Symbols a book of verse (1902)
- Orpheus Today: Saint Francis of the Trees and Other Verse (1906)
- Beyond Disillusion, a Dramatic Study of Modern Marriage (1915)
- Uncle Sam and Old World Conquerors (1915)
- The Gospel of Osiris (1916)
- Leaves of the Greater Bible (1917)
- The Religion of Old Glory (1919)
- Seven Oracles from the Cross (1935)
