= Frederick Guthrie (bass) =

Frederick Guthrie (March 31, 1924, in Pocatello, Idaho – December 6, 2008, in Vienna), was an American bass. He trained as an opera singer in Los Angeles with Glynn Ross and Hugo Strelitzer where he began his opera career in 1950. A Fulbright Scholarship enabled him to pursue further studies in Vienna with Elisabeth Radó in 1953. From 1954-1958 he was a resident principal artist at the Vienna State Opera. He went on to work extensively in European opera houses and in concerts with European orchestras in the 1960s and 1970s.
