= Geology of the Isle of Mull =

Geology of Scottish island

The geology of the Isle of Mull in Scotland is dominated by the development during the early Palaeogene period of a ‘volcanic central complex’ associated with the opening of the Atlantic Ocean. The bedrock of the larger part of the island is formed by basalt lava flows ascribed to the Mull Lava Group erupted onto a succession of Mesozoic sedimentary rocks during the Palaeocene epoch. Precambrian and Palaeozoic rocks occur at the island's margins. A number of distinct deposits and features such as raised beaches were formed during the Quaternary period.

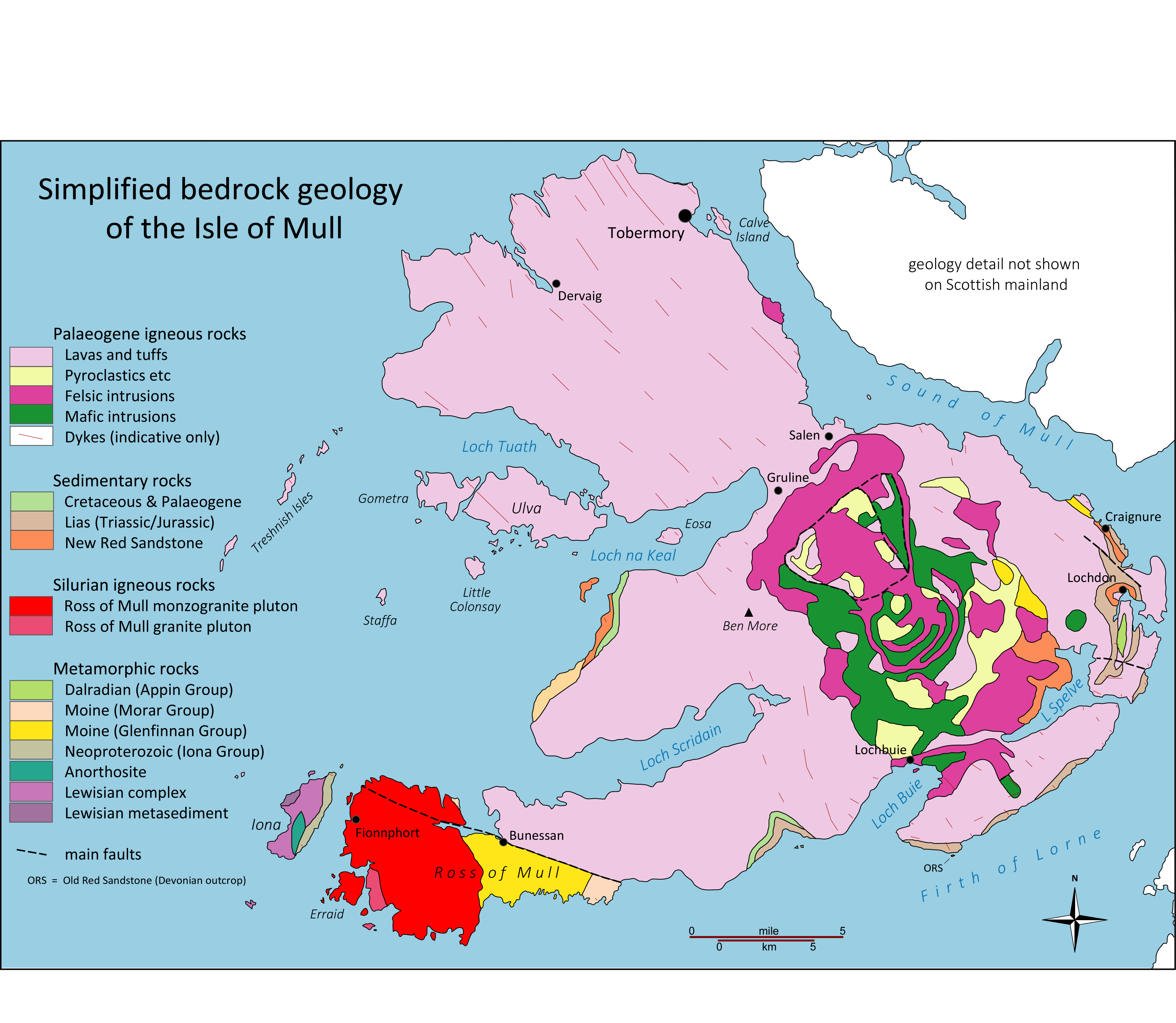
Simplified bedrock geology of the Isle of Mull

== Precambrian and Palaeozoic rocks ==
The central complex is underlain by the Neoproterozoic age metamorphosed Moine rocks and is intruded into them.

=== Moine ===
Rocks of the Glenfinnan Group occur in places around the Mull Central Complex and others from the Glenfinnan and Morar groups occur on the Ross of Mull.

=== Dalradian ===
Semipelites and metalimestones of the Appin Group occur within the Loch Don Anticline in the east of the island.

=== Palaeozoic granites ===
The Ross of Mull granite pluton was intruded during the Caledonian orogeny. Several zones with different petrological characteristics are identified; its character is essentially monzonite but includes zones of granodiorite, diorite and gabbro.

=== Devonian ===
A lower Old Red Sandstone conglomerate is seen at Frank Lockwood's Island just off the south coast of the Laggan peninsula.

== Mesozoic rocks ==
=== Triassic ===
A calcareous sandstone with a basal breccia unconformably overlying Moine rocks is found on a length of the west coast at Gribun, extending as far south as Aird na Iolaire and forms the island of Inch Kenneth just offshore. The formations include mudstones, conglomerates and carbonate concretions (cornstones) and are assigned to the New Red Sandstone. A late Triassic sandy limestone assigned to the Penarth Group overlies it. Conglomerates and sandstones of the Stornoway Formation, a sub-unit of the New Red Sandstone, occur widely around the western shores of Loch Spelve with small outliers on the west-facing coast of its northern arm. On the east coast, south of Tobermory are limited outcrops of presumed Triassic age sandstone and mudstones which have also been ascribed to the Stornoway Formation.

=== Jurassic ===
An outcrop of the Hettangian to Sinemurian age Blue Lias and Breakish formations occurs on the coast at Druim na Sroine-Cruime north of Tobermory. Sinemurian to Pliensbachian age mudstone of the Pabay Shale Formation and sandstone of the Scalpay Sandstone Formation form the low ground on which the town of Tobermory was built. At Carsaig on the south coast of the Ross of Mull, a Jurassic sequence is seen with Pabay Shale Formation mudstones overlain by the Scalpay Sandstone Formation then the micaceous and glauconitic sandstones of the Morvern Greensand Formation. The latter forms a part of the Inner Hebrides Group of Jurassic sediments. The Pabay Shale and Scalpay Sandstone occur widely along the southeast coast between Loch Buie to just north of the mouth of Loch Spelve, and inland within Glen Libidil. They also occur in a wide area around Loch Don and west of Duart Bay, where they are topped with a middle Jurassic limestone, and in more restricted fashion at Garmony east of Fishnish on the Sound of Mull. A very restricted outcrop of cross-bedded sandstones, the Bloody Bay Sandstone Formation, is seen at Bloody Bay on the north coast.

=== Palaeocene ===
The Ardtun Leaf Beds occur along the coast immediately east of Loch na Lathaich on the north side of the Ross of Mull peninsula. Sandwiched between lava flows, these are silty sandstones and conglomerates which were deposited in a lake and contain numerous tree leaf fossils.

== Palaeogene volcanism ==
The volcanic central complex of Mull was associated with the opening of the Atlantic Ocean. Along with other such centres in the west of Scotland, Northern Ireland, eastern Greenland, Norway and Iceland it forms a part of the Hebridean Igneous Province, itself a part of the much larger North Atlantic Igneous Province. Several centres are associated with the Mull volcanic complex as it developed, these being the Glen More centre, the Beinn Chaisgidle centre, and the Loch Ba centre. A significant positive Bouguer gravity anomaly is associated with the central complex as a whole. Radiometric dating of the Mull lavas and tuffs has given ages around 58-60 million years.

=== MacCulloch’s tree ===
During an extended geological survey which he began in 1811, Scottish geologist John MacCulloch discovered the 12m high cast within a lava flow of a large conifer tree of the genus Taxodioxylon (or Cupressinoxylon) in coastal rock exposures on the Ardmeanach peninsula. The cooling joints of the flow adjacent to the tree, which remains upright in growth position, are contorted by its presence. It is the largest and the most celebrated of several such trees to be found locally.

== Pre-Palaeogene structure ==
The Great Glen Fault extends through the southeastern part of Mull where it is seen to divide Moine rocks near Craignure from a Dalradian sequence at Loch Don. Though it is straight in its alignment on the Scottish mainland the fault has been deflected to the southeast by the Mull Central Complex, running beneath Loch Spelve and Loch Buie.

== Quaternary ==
Glacial deposits are common across Mull and since the last ice age, peat, river and beach deposits have developed whilst slope failure has occurred in some coastal areas.

=== Glacial legacy ===
A series of glaciations during the last 2 million years has carved erosional features such as glacial cirques into the landscape in and around Mull and left a variety of depositional forms such as moraines. Deposits of till from the last ice age are widespread around the island. Ice thicknesses have been reckoned at between 700m and 900m across Mull at the height of the last Ice Age with Ben More likely protruding above the ice surface as a nunatak. The absence of mainland erratics in the centre of Mull suggests it nurtured its own ice dome whilst elsewhere mainland ice streamed westward across the island. P-forms have been developed in basalt bedrock on the south side of Loch na Keal suggesting erosion by subglacial meltwater. Meltwaters deposited sand and gravel at the north end of Loch Don in the form of deltas. An icefield developed on Mull during the Loch Lomond Stadial, separate from that of the mainland forming terminal moraines at Kinochspelve and Loch Don.

=== Raised beaches ===
Raised marine deposits of Holocene age sand, gravel and silt are found around the coast and sometimes stretching inland by some way. The shores of Loch Tuath and Loch Spelve are notable in this respect, as too the eastern part of the island. These wave-cut platforms and raised beaches date from the period during and after the end of the last ice age when global sea levels were rising as ice-sheets melted in conjunction with the isostatic rebound of the land now relieved of the weight of ice.

=== Landslips ===
A number of landslips have occurred around the south and west coasts of Mull. A major one forms the eastern side of Carsaig Bay whilst a couple of smaller ones occur further west. Multiple slips affect the coast between Rubha a’ Ghearrain and Rubha na-Uamha on the Ardmeanach peninsula, notably at Balmeanach and ‘The Wilderness’. Each has occurred where basalt lavas overlie incompetent Mesozoic sedimentary rocks.

=== Peat ===
Peat deposits are widespread around Mull, particularly on lower ground of valleys in the interior of the island and in the western part of the Ross of Mull.

=== Alluvium ===
Alluvial deposits occur along valley floors and are postglacial in age. Some river terrace development is seen in Glen Forsa.

== Economic geology ==
The pink Caledonian granite at the western end of the Ross of Mull has been worked as a building stone and features locally in Iona Cathedral. It may also be found in the lighthouses at Skerryvore and Ardnamurchan Point and much further afield in the Albert Memorial and Blackfriars and Westminster bridges in London. Aggregate for road construction is sourced at a quarry opened in altered basalt near Salen. Sand and gravel are worked from moraines north of Loch Don. Poor quality lignitic coal discovered in small quantities at Ardtun was found to be uneconomical to mine. Diatomite found near Loch Bà has been used for whitewash. Sapphire gemstones have been recovered from inclusions within basalt sills at Carsaig and Loch Scridain.
