= Torosay =

Civil parish on Isle of Mull, Scotland

Coordinates: 56°28′2″N 5°42′2″W

- Civil parish
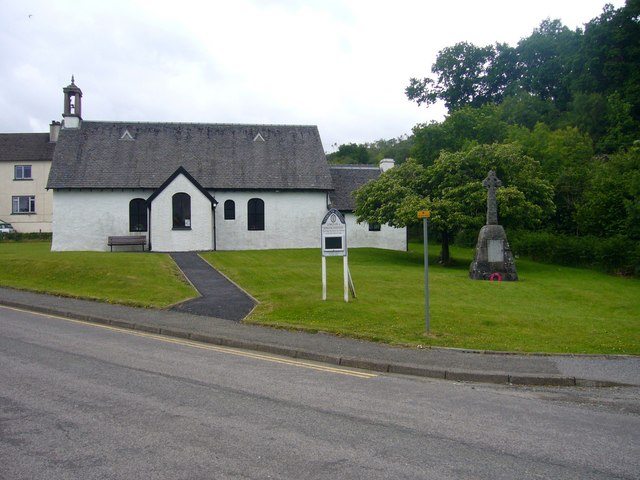
- Torosay parish church

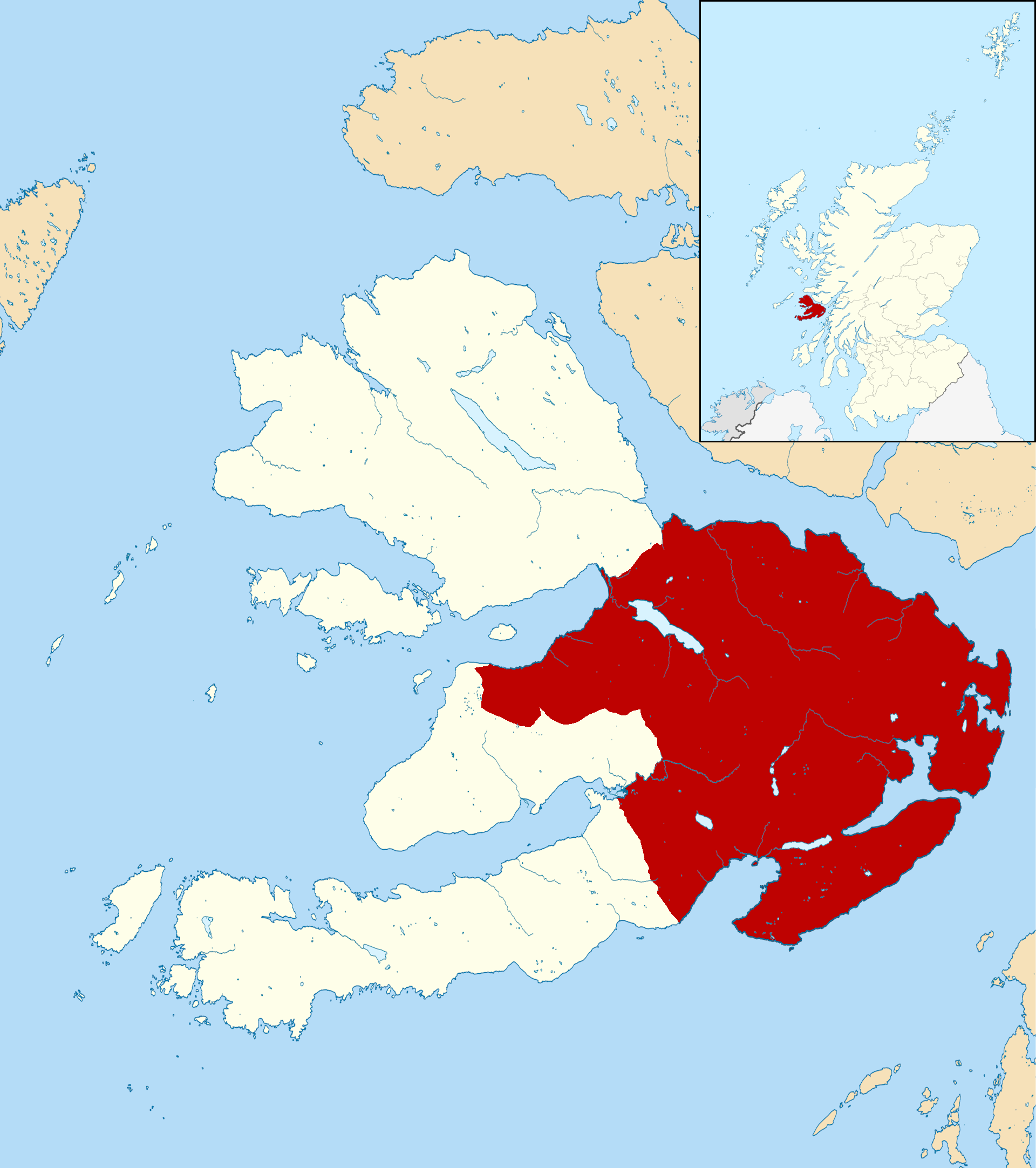
- Map of Torosay within Mull
- Area: 140 sq mi (360 km^{2})
- Population: 645 (2011)
  - Density: 5/sq mi (1.9/km^{2})
- OS grid reference: NM717371
- Civil parish: Torosay
- Council area: Argyll and Bute
- Lieutenancy area: Argyll and Bute
- Country: Scotland
- Sovereign state: United Kingdom
- Post town: ISLE OF MULL
- Postcode district: PA65
- Dialling code: 01680
- Police: Scotland
- Fire: Scottish
- Ambulance: Scottish
- UK Parliament: Argyll, Bute and South Lochaber
- Scottish Parliament: Argyll and Bute

Parishes of the Isle of Mull (1891) Torosay shown in red (labelled 10)

Torosay is a civil parish on the Isle of Mull in the county of Argyll, Scotland, part of the Argyll and Bute council area. It is one of three parishes on the island and extends over the central and south-eastern part. It is bordered by the parish of Kilninian and Kilmore in the north and Kilfinichen and Kilvickeon in the south-west. It extends about 12 miles (19 kilometres) east-west and 10 miles (16 kilometres) north-south.

== Etymology ==
The name Torosay appears to be derived from the Gaelic word for a conical hill and influenced by the common Old Norse ending ay, meaning island.

== History ==
The parish church of Torosay, which is in Craignure, dates from 1783. Its style is plain Georgian oblong. It underwent repairs in 1828 and again in 1832, when it was struck by lightning. In the 19th century, churches were built by the government at Kinlochspelvie and Salen, resulting in separate quoad sacra (church only) parishes; but the former is now reunited with Torosay, while the latter still exists .

== Geography ==
The parish touches the west coast of Mull at Loch na Keal and includes the island of Eorsa. The River Ba, which flows into this loch, takes the overflow of the freshwater loch Loch Ba 2 miles (3.2 kilometres) inland. Also in the west of the parish, by its south-west border, is Ben More (3,169 ft (966 m)), the highest point in the island (the name means great mountain in Gaelic).

On the north-east coast it is separated from the mainland by the Sound of Mull. On its south-east coast, part of it is almost severed from the rest of the parish by the sea lochs Spelve and Buie, together with the freshwater loch Uisg, in between. This peninsula, which includes the hamlet of Croggan, is joined to the main island by a small isthmus at Kinlochspelvie and another at the settlement of Lochbuie. There is a smaller sea loch Loch Don, which gives its name to the hamlet of Lochdon (or Lochdonhead). Further north, there is a bay at Craignure which is the location of a ferry port.

== Demographics ==
At the 2011 census, the population of the civil parish was 645. 17.5% had some knowledge of Gaelic. In 1891 80% were Gaelic speaking. The area of the parish is 89,584 acres (140.0 mi^{2}; 362.5 km^{2}).

The parish council was formed in 1895 with 7 elected members. This was replaced by Mull District Council in 1930, which had 6 members, 3 of whom were the County Councillors for Mull and 3 elected to the District Council from wards based on the three parishes. Since 1976 there has been an Isle of Mull community council.

== Landmarks ==
- Duart Castle
- Duart Point lighthouse (William Black Memorial Lighthouse)
- Moy Castle
- Torosay Castle
- Torosay railway station
- Torosay transmitting station

== Settlements ==
- Craignure
- Croggan
- Gruline
- Lochbuie
- Lochdon
- Salen

== See also ==
- Kilfinichen and Kilvickeon
- Kilninian and Kilmore
