= List of shipwrecks in January 1853 =

The list of shipwrecks in January 1853 includes ships sunk, foundered, wrecked, grounded, or otherwise lost during January 1853.

== 1 January ==
List of shipwrecks: 1 January 1853
Ship	State	Description
Cleveland	United Kingdom	The schooner was abandoned in the North Sea. Her crew were rescued by a Dutch fishing vessel. She was on a voyage from Maldon, Essex to Sunderland, County Durham. She came ashore at Mandal, Norway about 4 January. Cleveland was refloated on 10 January and taken in to Mandal.
Henrietta	United Kingdom	The ship ran aground and sank on the Falsterbo Reef, in the Baltic Sea.
John Burrell	United Kingdom	The ship was abandoned in the Skaggerak. Her crew were rescued by Arquter (Norway). John Burrell was on a voyage from Newcastle upon Tyne, Northumberland to London.
John Hutchinson	United Kingdom	The ship was wrecked south of Buena Ventura, Republic of New Granada. She was on a voyage from Liverpool, Lancashire to Panama City, Republic of New Granada.
Mary Ann	United Kingdom	The brig ran aground on the Whiting Sand, in the North Sea off the coast of Suffolk. She was refloated and resumed her voyage.
Venus	United Kingdom	The ship was driven ashore and wrecked at the mouth of the River Tay. She was on a voyage from Newburgh, Fife to Dundee, Forfarshire.

== 2 January ==
List of shipwrecks: 2 January 1853
Ship	State	Description
Broughton	United Kingdom	The collier, a brig was wrecked near Bergen, Norway with the loss of a crew member. She was on a voyage from the River Thames to South Shields, County Durham.
Helme	United Kingdom	The ship was abandoned in the North Sea 60 nautical miles (110 km) south south east of Tynemouth, Northumberland. Her crew were rescued by Perseverance (United Kingdom). Helme was on a voyage from Hartlepool, County Durham to King's Lynn, Norfolk.
J. W. Collingwood	United Kingdom	The brig ran aground on the Cork Sand, in the North Sea off the coast of Suffolk. She was refloated with the assistance of several smacks and taken in to Harwich.
Menai	United Kingdom	The ship ran aground at Skibbereen, County Cork. She was on a voyage from Constantinople, Ottoman Empire to Queenstown, County Cork.
Merchant	United Kingdom	The ship was driven ashore on Inner Farne Island, in the Farne Islands, Northumberland. Her crew were rescued.
Pandora	United Kingdom	The ship was driven ashore near Cape Bon, Beylik of Tunis. She was on a voyage from Kertch, Russia to Falmouth, Cornwall of Queenstown, County Cork.
Sailor's Home	United Kingdom	The ship departed from the Belfast Lough for Alnmouth, Northumberland. No further trace, presumed foundered with the loss of all hands.
Urania	United Kingdom	The ship was driven ashore at Skibbereen, County Kerry. She was on a voyage from Constantinople, Ottoman Empire to Queenstown, County Cork.

== 3 January ==
List of shipwrecks: 3 January 1853
Ship	State	Description
Anne	United Kingdom	The brig was wrecked on the Goodwin Sands, Kent. Her crew were rescued by Garland (United Kingdom). Ann was on a voyage from Saldanha Bay to Sunderland, County Durham and/or Berwick upon Tweed, Northumberland.
George IV	United Kingdom	The ship foundered in the North Sea 25 nautical miles (46 km) east north east of Inchcape. Her crew were rescued by St. Anthony's United Kingdom.
Grace	United Kingdom	The brig was driven ashore at Camden Point, County Cork. She was on a voyage from Demerara, British Guiana to Workington, Cumberland. She was refloated the next day and taken in to Queenstown, County Cork.
Helen	United Kingdom	The ship was abandoned in the North Sea off Tynemouth, Northumberland. Her crew were rescued. She was on a voyage from Hartlepool, County Durham to King's Lynn, Norfolk.
Jean	United Kingdom	The sloop was driven ashore at Rothesay, Bute. Her crew were rescued. She was on a voyage from Londonderry to Belfast, County Antrim.
Lively	United Kingdom	The ship was driven ashore at Dunfanaghy, County Donegal. Her crew were rescued.
Queen of Britain	United Kingdom	The ship was driven ashore near Berbice, British Guiana. . She was refloated on 11 January and taken in to Berbice for repairs.
Sancta Maria	France	The ship was driven ashore at Cardiff, Glamorgan, United Kingdom. She was on a voyage from Saint-Malo, Ille-et-Vilaine to Cardiff. She was refloated on 5 January and taken in to Cardiff.
Spring	United Kingdom	The brig was abandoned in the North Sea off the coast of Aberdeenshire. Her crew survived.

== 4 January ==
List of shipwrecks: 4 January 1853
Ship	State	Description
Effort	United Kingdom	The schooner was driven ashore at Holme's Hole, Massachusetts, United States.
Elizabeth	(United Kingdom of Great Britain and Ireland) Jersey	The schooner ran aground on the Inner Shoal, in the North Sea off the coast of Suffolk. She was on a voyage from Newcastle upon Tyne, Northumberland to Jersey. She was refloated.
Elizabetta	Netherlands	The ship ran aground on the Egirland Banks, in the North Sea. She was on a voyage from Amsterdam, North Holland to Messina, Sicily.
John, and Portland	United Kingdom	The brig John was in collision with Portland and sank at Kirkcudbright. Portland was consequently beached.
Krone	Prussia	The brig was driven ashore and wrecked at Holyhead, Anglesey, United Kingdom. Her crew were rescued. She was on a voyage from Wilmington, Delaware, United States to Liverpool, Lancashire, United Kingdom.
Mary Cork	United Kingdom	The ship was driven ashore and wrecked at Breaksea Point, Glamorgan.

== 5 January ==
List of shipwrecks: 5 January 1853
Ship	State	Description
Brazilian	United Kingdom	The ship ran aground on the East Hoyle Bank, in Liverpool Bay. She was on a voyage from Liverpool, Lancashire to Buenos Aires, Argentina. She was refloated the next day.
Chatham	United States	The brig was wrecked on a reef off an inhabited island in the Pacific Ocean. All on board were rescued but she was plundered by the islanders. She was on a voyage from San Francisco, California to the South Seas.
Jeltena Margaretha	Prussia	The ship ran aground and was wrecked off "Bjerregaard". Her crew were rescued. She was on a voyage from Rügenwalde to Rochester, Kent, United Kingdom.
Julius	Denmark	The ship was driven ashore at Cardiff, Glamorgan, United Kingdom.
Leader	United Kingdom	The schooner sprang a leak and was beached at Grimsby, Lincolnshire. She was on a voyage from Hartlepool, County Durham to Margate, Kent.
Mary Ann	United Kingdom	The ship was driven ashore at Cardiff.
Paxton	United Kingdom	The ship was abandoned in the Atlantic Ocean and set afire. Her crew were rescued by Laura (United Kingdom). Paxton was on a voyage from Saint John, New Brunswick, British North America to Glasgow, Renfrewshire.
Samuel and Ann	United Kingdom	The Yorkshire Billyboy ran aground on the Rose Sand, in the North Sea off the coast of Lincolnshire. She was on a voyage from Goole, Yorkshire to King's Lynn, Norfolk. She was refloated and taken in to Grimsby, Lincolnshire.
Tabina	Kingdom of Hanover	The ship was wrecked off "Hunsbye". She was on a voyage from Sunderland, County Durham, United Kingdom to Amsterdam, North Holland, Netherlands.
Wilson	United Kingdom	The ship struck the pier and was beached at Maryport, Cumberland. She was on a voyage from Liverpool to Maryport.

== 6 January ==
List of shipwrecks: 6 January 1853
Ship	State	Description
Adolphe	France	The brig was wrecked on Great Inagua. Her crew were rescued. She was on a voyage from Port-au-Prince, Haiti to Marseille, Bouches-du-Rhône.
Comete	France	The ship was lost whilst on a voyage from Martinique to Haiti.
Commerce	United Kingdom	The brig foundered in the North Sea 3 miles (4.8 km) south of Filey, Yorkshire. Her crew survived. She was on a voyage from Sunderland, County Durham to Lowestoft, Suffolk.
Marys	United Kingdom	The schooner ran aground on the Holm Sand, in the North Sea off the coast of Suffolk. Six of her seven crew were rescued by the Pakefield Lifeboat; the other crew member was rescued by the Lowestoft Lifeboat. She floated off but was wrecked on the Newcombe Sand. Marys was on a voyage from Sunderland, County Durham to Ipswich, Suffolk.
Ramsgate	United Kingdom	The brig was abandoned off the coast of Norway. Her crew were rescued by Edward (Bremen). Ramsgate was on a voyage from Sandwich, Kent to Hartlepool, County Durham.
Ranger	United Kingdom	The schooner foundered off "Voel Nant". Her crew were rescued.

== 7 January ==
List of shipwrecks: 7 January 1853
Ship	State	Description
Alice	United Kingdom	The ship was driven ashore at Exmouth, Devon.
Liberal	(United Kingdom of Great Britain and Ireland) British North America	The brig was driven ashore at Jedore, Nova Scotia. She was on a voyage from Saint John's, Newfoundland to New York, United States. She was later refloated and taken in to Halifax, Nova Scotia, where she arrived on 22 January.
Mary and Ann	United Kingdom	The Humber Keel was driven ashore in the Humber. Her crew were rescued. She was later refloated and taken in to Hull, Yorkshire in a leaky condition.
Middleton	United Kingdom	The ship was driven ashore on Tierra Bomba Island, Republic of New Granada. She was on a voyage from Liverpool, Lancashire to "Santa Martha" and Cartagena, Republic of New Granada. She was refloated, repaired and resumed her voyage.
Ohio	United Kingdom	The ship ran aground at Youghal, County Cork. She was on a voyage from Trieste to Queenstown, County Cork. She was refloated and taken in to Youghal.
Pilgrim	(United Kingdom of Great Britain and Ireland) Isle of Man	The ship was driven ashore at Harrington, Cumberland. Her crew were rescued. She was on a voyage from Ramsey to Whitehaven, Cumberland.
Sarah Parker	United Kingdom	The ship was driven ashore and wrecked 7 leagues (49 nautical miles (91 km) south of Porto, Portugal. She was on a voyage from Hartlepool, County Durham to Constantinople, Ottoman Empire.
William and Mary	United Kingdom	The ship was abandoned in the North Sea off the Longstone Lighthouse, Northumberland. Her crew were rescued.

== 8 January ==
List of shipwrecks: 8 January 1853
Ship	State	Description
Aid	United Kingdom	The sloop was driven ashore and wrecked at Bamburgh Castle, Northumberland. She was on a voyage from Sunderland, County Durham to Fisherrow, Lothian.
Anne	United Kingdom	The ship was driven ashore in the Humber. She was on a voyage from Newcastle upon Tyne, Northumberland to Plymouth, Devon. She was refloated and taken in to Hull, Yorkshire.
Jane Watson	United Kingdom	The ship was abandoned in the Atlantic Ocean. Her crew were rescued by the barque Admiral Brommy (Bremen). Jane Watson was on a voyage from Sydney, Nova Scotia, British North America to Dublin.

== 9 January ==
List of shipwrecks: 9 January 1853
Ship	State	Description
Afonso	Imperial Brazilian Navy	The frigate was run ashore and wrecked west of Cape Rio.
Edward	United Kingdom	The ship was wrecked at Ramsey, Isle of Man. She was on a voyage from Cartagena de Colombia, Republic of New Granada to Liverpool, Lancashire.
Joseph	United Kingdom	The ship was wrecked 60 nautical miles (110 km) north of Bergen, Norway. Her crew were rescued.

== 10 January ==
List of shipwrecks: 10 January 1853
Ship	State	Description
Jessamine	United Kingdom	The ship was driven ashore at Littlehampton, Sussex.
Sophia	United Kingdom	The barque was driven ashore and sank near Charleston, South Carolina, United States. All on board were rescued. She was on a voyage from Liverpool, Lancashire to Charleston.
Zero	United Kingdom	The brig ran aground on the Shipwash Sand, in the North Sea off the coast of Suffolk and was abandoned. Her crew were rescued by the smack Four Brothers (United Kingdom). Zero was on a voyage from Newcastle upon Tyne, Northumberland to Poole, Dorset.

== 11 January ==
List of shipwrecks: 11 January 1853
Ship	State	Description
Brenda	United Kingdom	The ship was wrecked at Otterswick, Sanday, Orkney Islands.
Charlotte Frederick	Danzig	The ship was driven ashore and wrecked at "Polteel", Isle of Skye, United Kingdom. She was on a voyage from Danzig to Liverpool, Lancashire, United Kingdom.
Clio	United Kingdom	The brig foundered in the North Sea off Tynemouth, Northumberland. Her crew were rescued by the brig Endeavour (United Kingdom). Clio was on a voyage from Sunderland, County Durham to Caen, Calvados, France.
Lady of the Lake	United Kingdom	The schooner was driven onto the Hal Rock, off Berehaven, County Cork. Her crew were rescued. She was on a voyage from Lydney, Gloucestershire to Tralee, County Kerry.
Tale	United Kingdom	The ship was driven ashore at Dungeness, Kent. She was on a voyage from Hull, Yorkshire to Penzance, Cornwall. She was refloated and assisted in to Ramsgate, Kent.

== 12 January ==
List of shipwrecks: 12 January 1853
Ship	State	Description
Albion	United Kingdom	The brig ran aground on the Gunfleet Sand, in the North Sea off the coast of Essex. She was on a voyage from Newcastle upon Tyne, Northumberland to London. She was refloated with the assistance of the smacks Fox and Wide-awake (both United Kingdom) and taken in to Harwich, Essex.
Ann Moore	United Kingdom	The brig was in collision with another vessel and then ran aground on the Stoney Binks, in the North Sea off the mouth of the Humber. She was refloated and towed in to Grimsby, Lincolnshire.

== 13 January ==
List of shipwrecks: 12 January 1853
Ship	State	Description
Cornelius Grinnell	United States	During a voyage from London, United Kingdom, to New York City, the 1,100-ton sailing ship was driven ashore and wrecked in a storm on the coast of New Jersey on "Squan Beach" — also called "Squam," "Squam Beach," or "Squan," all terms used at the time for the coast of New Jersey between Manasquan Inlet and Cranberry Inlet and sometimes for the entire coast of New Jersey between Sea Girt and Barnegat Inlet. All 234 people on board were rescued.
Dyo Felo	Ottoman Empire	The ship was driven ashore at Gijón, Spain. She was on a voyage from Liverpool, Lancashire, United Kingdom to Constantinople. She was refloated and taken in to Gijón.
Guardian	United Kingdom	The ship ran aground on the Foulness Rocks, on the coast of Norfolk. She was refloated and resumed her voyage.
Mervin	United Kingdom	The brig was abandoned in the North Sea. Her crew were rescued by the barque Meter (United Kingdom). Mervin was on a voyage from South Shields, County Durham to London. She was discovered 30 nautical miles (56 km) off the coast of Yorkshire by the smack Briton (United Kingdom) and was taken in to, but sank the next day.
Sea Dog	United Kingdom	The ship was driven ashore and wrecked at Hirtshals, Denmark. Her crew were rescued.

== 14 January ==
List of shipwrecks: 14 January 1853
Ship	State	Description
Hannah	United Kingdom	The schooner ran aground on Harold's Rock. She was on a voyage from Limerick to Glasgow, Renfrewshire. She was refloated the next day and put back to Limerick.
Herald	United Kingdom	The ship was in collision with a schooner off The Lizard, Cornwall. She consequently sank the next day with the loss of eighteen of the nineteen people on board. The survivor was rescued by Fadrines Minde ( Duchy of Holstein ). Herald was on a voyage from Madras, India to London.
Hornet	United Kingdom	The ship was driven ashore near Glin, County Limerick. She was on a voyage from Limerick to Bristol, Gloucestershire. She was refloated on 29 January and resumed her voyage.
Petite Camille	France	The ship was destroyed by fire in the North Sea. Her crew were rescued. She was on a voyage from Newcastle upon Tyne, Northumberland, United Kingdom to Bordeaux, Gironde.

== 15 January ==
List of shipwrecks: 15 January 1853
Ship	State	Description
Ariel	United Kingdom	The galiot was driven ashore near Dunkirk, Nord, France. She was on a voyage from Newcastle upon Tyne, Northumberland to Bristol, Gloucestershire and/or Liverpool, Lancashire.
Derwent	United Kingdom	The ship ran aground on the Whiting Sand, in the North Sea off the coast of Suffolk. She was refloated with the assistance of a smack and taken in to Orford, Suffolk where she ran aground and was abandoned by all but her captain. She was on a voyage from Seaham, County Durham to London.
Dolphin	United Kingdom	The sloop sank in the River Avon. Her crew were rescued. She was on a voyage from Cardiff, Glamorgan to Bristol, Gloucestershire.
Elizabeth	(United Kingdom of Great Britain and Ireland) Isle of Man	The ship was driven ashore north of Loch Don. She was on a voyage from Montrose, Forfarshire to Liverpool.
Ellen	United Kingdom	The smack sprang a leak and sank off Port Eynon, Glamorgan with the loss of two of her three crew. She was on a voyage from Haverfordwest, Pembrokeshire to Bristol, Gloucestershire.
Friede	Belgium	The ship was driven ashore on Heligoland with the loss of three of her crew. She was on a voyage from Newcastle upon Tyne to Palermo, Sicily.
Jennetta	United Kingdom	The sloop was holed by an anchor and sank at South Shields, County Durham. She was refloated on 25 January and placed under repair.
Lord Brougham and Vaux	United Kingdom	The ship ran aground on the Herd Sand, in the North Sea off the coast of County Durham. She was on a voyage from London to South Shields. She was refloated on 24 January and towed in to South Shields.
Philanthropist	United Kingdom	The ship ran aground at Dysart, Aberdeenshire.
Suspense	United Kingdom	The schooner was driven ashore at "Cushindon Waterfoot". Her crew were rescued. She was on a voyage from Liverpool, Lancashire to Londonderry.
Toby	United Kingdom	The schooner was run down and sunk by the schooner Matchless with the loss of all but one of her crew.
Vernon	United Kingdom	The ship ran aground on the Drum Sand, in the North Sea off the coast of Lothian. She was on a voyage from Leith, Lothian to London. She was refloated and taken in to St. David's.
Yarmouth	United States	The ship foundered in the Atlantic Ocean. Her crew were rescued by a Royal Navy sloop-of-war. She was on a voyage from Gibraltar to Salem, Massachusetts.

== 16 January ==
List of shipwrecks: 16 January 1853
Ship	State	Description
Abra	United Kingdom	The ship collided with the schooner Lavinia (United Kingdom and sank in Chappel Bay. Her crew were rescued.
Asia	United Kingdom	The paddle steamer ran aground at Commissioner's Point, Nova Scotia, British North America. She was on a voyage from Liverpool, Lancashire to New York, United States.
Caledonia	United Kingdom	The brig struck the quayside and consequently sank at Sunderland, County Durham.
Cerus	United Kingdom	The ship ran aground on the Sizewell Bank, in the North Sea off the coast of Suffolk. She was refloated and resumed her voyage in a leaky condition.
Drie Gebroeders	Netherlands	The ship was lost between Camperduin and Egmond aan Zee, North Holland. Her crew were rescued. She was on a voyage from Amsterdam, North Holland to London, United Kingdom.
Fortuna	Prussia	The ship ran aground off the south coast of Amager, Denmark. She was on a voyage from Memel to Hull, Yorkshire. She was refloated on 20 January and taken in to Copenhagen, Denmark for repairs.
Fruiterer	United Kingdom	The schooner was in collision with the schooner William Cobden ( (United Kingdom of Great Britain and Ireland) Guernsey) and was abandoned by her crew, who were rescued by the schooner Thames (United Kingdom). Fruiterer was subsequently taken in to Hull.
Gleaner	United Kingdom	The schooner was driven ashore at Spittal Point, Northumberland. Her crew were rescued. She was on a voyage from Grangemouth, Stirlingshire to Calais, France. She was refloated on 26 January and taken in to Berwick upon Tweed, Northumberland for repairs.
Queensbury	United Kingdom	The schooner was driven ashore at Ballywater, County Wexford. She wason a voyage from Liverpool, Lancashire to Belfast, County Antrim.
Regina	United Kingdom	The ship was in collision with William Stetson (United States) and sank in the English Channel 3 nautical miles (5.6 km) south west of Dover, Kent. Her crew were rescued. She was on a voyage from London to the Mediterranean.
Rosalind	United Kingdom	The barque sank at Hartlepool, County Durham. She was refloated on 25 January.
Sarah Rawes	United Kingdom	The ship was driven ashore and sank at Breaksea Point, Glamorgan. She was on a voyage from Whitehaven, Cumberland to Cardiff, Glamorgan.
Supply	United Kingdom	The brig ran aground on the Sizewell Bank. She was on a voyage from South Shields, County Durham to London. She was refloated and taken in to Lowestoft, Suffolk in a severely leaky condition.

== 17 January ==
List of shipwrecks: 17 January 1853
Ship	State	Description
Aquila	United Kingdom	The schooner was driven ashore at Broadstairs, Kent. She was refloated on 20 January and taken in to Broadstairs.
British Merchant	United Kingdom	The ship was destroyed by fire in the Atlantic Ocean. Her crew were rescued by Roxburgh Castle (United Kingdom). British Merchant was on a voyage from Cochin, India to London.
Camilla	United Kingdom	The paddle steamer ran aground at Dublin. She was on a voyage from Dublin to London. She was refloated the next day.
Eleanor	United Kingdom	The ship was wrecked at Dieppe, Seine-Inférieure, France. Her crew were rescued. She was on a voyage from Sunderland, County Durham to Dieppe.
Emerald Isle	United Kingdom	The ship was driven ashore at Beaumaris, Anglesey. She was on a voyage from Liverpool, Lancashire to London. She was refloated.
Gaspar	United Kingdom	The ship was in collision with Kate Howe (United Kingdom) 27 nautical miles (50 km) west south west of St. Ann's Head, Pembrokeshire and was abandoned. Her crew were rescued by Kate Howe. Gaspar was on a voyage from Newport, Monmouthshire to Cork.
Henry Cotes	United Kingdom	The brig was driven ashore at Dieppe.
Nathaniel Kemball	United States	The ship was wrecked on the Sand Key. She was on a voyage from New Orleans, Louisiana to Liverpool.
Sarah	United Kingdom	The ship was driven ashore at Beaumaris. She was on a voyage from Wicklow to Liverpool. She was refloated and put back to Wicklow in a leaky condition.

== 18 January ==
List of shipwrecks: 18 January 1853
Ship	State	Description
Arrow	United Kingdom	The ship ran aground and was damaged at Neath, Glamorgan. She was on a voyage from Neath to Teignmouth, Devon. She was refloated and towed back to Neath in a leaky condition.
Asiatic	United Kingdom	The ship was in collision with Sophia Burbidge (United Kingdom) and sank in the Bristol Channel with the loss of two lives.
Devonshire	United Kingdom	The ship ran aground at Neath. She was on a voyage from Neath to London. She was refloated and towed back to Neath.
Eleanor	United Kingdom	The ship ran aground on the Shipwash Sand, in the North Sea off the coast of Suffolk. She was on a voyage from Exeter, Devon to Hartlepool, County Durham. She was refloated and taken in to Dover, Kent in a leaky condition. She was consequently condemned.
Lord Melbourne	United Kingdom	The Yorkshire Billyboy was wrecked on the Knock John Sand, in the North Sea off the coast of Essex. Her crew were rescued by the smack Daring (United Kingdom). Lord Melbourne was on a voyage from Goole, Yorkshire to Great Yarmouth, Norfolk and Portsmouth, Hampshire.
Naomi	(United Kingdom of Great Britain and Ireland) British North America	The brig was wrecked near Outer Cove, Newfoundland with the loss of all hands. She was on a voyage from Cádiz, Spain to Newfoundland.
Tamaulipa	United Kingdom	The ship was lost in Cardigan Bay.

== 19 January ==
List of shipwrecks: 19 January 1853
Ship	State	Description
Civility	United Kingdom	The ship was in collision with Ashland (United States) and was abandoned in the English Channe off the coast of Hampshire. She was on a voyage from Onega, Russia to Bristol, Gloucestershire.
James and Sarah	United Kingdom	The schooner ran aground on the Gunfleet Sand, in the North Sea off the coast of Essex. She was on a voyage from Lowestoft, Suffolk to Blackwall, Middlesex. She was refloated with assistance from the smack Liberty (United Kingdom) and taken in to Wivenhoe, Essex.
Lord Lambton	United Kingdom	The ship ran aground on the Barber Sand, in the North Sea off the coast of Norfolk. She was on a voyage from London to South Shields, County Durham. She was refloated and resumed her voyage.

== 20 January ==
List of shipwrecks: 20 January 1853
Ship	State	Description
Calypso	United Kingdom	The ship ran aground on the Goodwin Sands, Kent. She was on a voyage from London to Jamaica. She was refloated and taken in to The Downs.
Clifton	(United Kingdom of Great Britain and Ireland) British North America	The brig was abandoned in the Atlantic Ocean with the loss of three of her crew. Survivors were rescued by Thetis (United Kingdom). Clifton was on a voyage from Saint John, New Brunswick to Glasgow, Renfrewshire. She was still afloat on 3 April.
Jeune Achille et Leonide	France	The ship ran aground on the Margate Sand. She was on a voyage from Dunkirk, Nord to London. She was refloated and taken in to Margate, Kent in a severely leaky condition.
Kate	United Kingdom	The schooner sprang a leak and was beached at Dungeness, Kent, where she became a wreck. Her crew were rescued by the lugger Flora (United Kingdom). Kate was on a voyage from Sunderland, County Durham to Rouen, Seine-Inférieure.
Lady Helen Stewart	United Kingdom	The ship was driven ashore at Kilness Point, Wigtownshire. She was refloated and taken in to Stranraer.
Liverpool	United Kingdom	The sloop was driven ashore at Kirkcaldy, Fife. She was on a voyage from East Wemyss, Fife to Leith, Lothian. She was refloated on 22 January and taken in to Kirkcaldy.
Mary and Sarah	United Kingdom	The ship was driven ashore east of Rottingdean, Sussex. Her crew were rescued. She was on a voyage from Sunderland to Southampton, Hampshire.
Richard	Stralsund	The ship was driven onto the Bemer Rocks, on the coast of Fife. She was on a voyage from Stralsund to Grangemouth, Stirlingshire, United Kingdom.
Sion	United Kingdom	The ship was wrecked on the Placere. She was on a voyage from Cienfuegos, Cuba to Queenstown, County Cork.

== 21 January ==
List of shipwrecks: 21 January 1853
Ship	State	Description
Ariadne	United Kingdom	The ship foundered off Dungeness, Kent. Her crew were rescued. She was on a voyage from Sunderland, County Durham to Honfleur, Manche, France.
Calden	United Kingdom	The barque was wrecked on a reef in the Pacific Ocean (62°00′S 161°48′W). Her crew took to three boats. Those in one of the boats were rescued on 13 February by the brig Eclipse (United States). No trace of the remaining eighteen crew in the other two boats. Calden was on a voyage from Sydney, New South Wales to San Francisco, California, United States.
Henry	United States	The schooner was abandoned in the Atlantic Ocean. Her crew were rescued by W. D. Sewall (United States).

== 22 January ==
List of shipwrecks: 22 January 1853
Ship	State	Description
Acorn	United Kingdom	The ship was driven ashore and wrecked at Goswick, Northumberland. Her crew were rescued. She was on a voyage from Dunbar, Lothian to Hartlepool, County Durham. Acorn was refloated on 29 January and towed in to Lindisfarne, Northumberland.
Earl of Newburg	United Kingdom	The ship ran aground on the Herd Sand, in the North Sea off the coast of County Durham. She was refloated the next day.
Elizabeth and Sarah	United Kingdom	The sloop was driven ashore 4 nautical miles (7.4 km) north of North Somercotes, Lincolnshire. She was on a voyage from Sunderland, County Durham to Hull, Yorkshire. She was refloated on 31 January and taken in to Hull in a leaky condition.
Eliza Jane	United Kingdom	The ship ran aground at Cardiff, Glamorgan.
Gavan Hill	United Kingdom	The ship was wrecked on the Hoyle Bank, in Liverpool Bay. She was on a voyage from Dundalk, County Louth to Liverpool, Lancashire.
Hope	United Kingdom	The ship was wrecked at Redcar, Yorkshire. Her crew were rescued. She was on a voyage from South Shields, County Durham to London.
Pearl	United Kingdom	The ship ran aground at St. Mawes, Glamorgan and was damaged. She was on a voyage from Neath, Glamorgan to Gibraltar.
Robert	United Kingdom	The sloop was driven ashore and wrecked 4 nautical miles (7.4 km) north of North Somercotes. She was on a voyage from St. Andrews, Fife to Goole, Yorkshire.
Susan	United Kingdom	The ship was driven ashore and wrecked at Boulogne, Pas-de-Calais, France. She was on a voyage from Newcastle upon Tyne, Northumberland to Boulogne.
Rhyl Lifeboat	United Kingdom	The lifeboat capsized in the Irish Sea with the loss of six of her nine crew. She was going to the assistance of Lord Ashburton (United Kingdom), which subsequently put in to Beaumaris, Anglesey.

== 23 January ==
List of shipwrecks: 23 January 1853
Ship	State	Description
Albert	United Kingdom	The flat was run into by George (United Kingdom) and sank in the River Mersey. Her crew were rescued.
Alida Jacoba	Netherlands	The ship departed on this date. No further trace, presumed foundered with the loss of all hands.
Ann and Sarah	United Kingdom	The sloop was sunk off West Kirby, Cheshire. She was subsequently taken in to Mostyn, Flintshire.
Charlotte and Carl	Netherlands	The schooner was driven ashore and wrecked at North Somercotes, Lincolnshire. She was on a voyage from Riga, Russia to Hull, Yorkshire.
Daisy	United Kingdom	The sloop was driven ashore at Hartlepool, County Durham. She was on a voyage from Glasgow, Renfrewshire to Dunkirk, Nord.
Eugene	United Kingdom	The ship sank off Lydd, Kent. Her crew were rescued. She was on a voyage from King's Lynn, Norfolk to Poole, Dorset.
Ellen Cook	United Kingdom	The ship was driven ashore at Cayeux-sur-Mer, Somme. Her crew were rescued. She was on a voyage from Sunderland, County Durham to Saint-Valery-sur-Somme, Somme. Ellen Cook was refloated on 13 February and towed in to Saint-Valery-sur-Somme.
Sisters	United Kingdom	The ship was wrecked at Boulmer, Northumberland. She was on a voyage from Bo'ness, Lothian to Newcastle upon Tyne, Northumberland.
Suffolk Trader	United Kingdom	The sailing barge was holed by her anchor and sank at Rye, Sussex. She was on a voyage from London to Portland, Dorset. She had been refloated by 4 February.

== 24 January ==
List of shipwrecks: 24 January 1853
Ship	State	Description
Briton	United Kingdom	The schooner was wrecked on the Goodwin Sands, Kent. Her crew survived. She was on a voyage from South Shields, County Durham to Bristol, Gloucestershire.
Carl and Agnes	Denmark	The schooner was driven ashore at Whitby, Yorkshire, United Kingdom. Her crew were rescued. She was on a voyage from Hamburg to Leith, Lothian, United Kingdom. She was refloated on 26 January and taken in to Whitby.
Hero	United Kingdom	The ship was wrecked on Beak's Key, Bahamas. She was on a voyage from Matanzas, Cuba to the Clyde.
Italy	Kingdom of Sardinia	The ship ran aground on the Manilla Reef and was abandoned. She was on a voyage from New Orleans, Louisiana, United States to Genoa.
Vrouw Alida	Prussia	The ship sprang a leak and was beached on Heligoland. Her crew were rescued. She was on a voyage from Kiel to the Firth of Forth.

== 25 January ==
List of shipwrecks: 25 January 1853
Ship	State	Description
Ann	United Kingdom	The ship was driven ashore and wrecked south of Malahide, County Dublin. Her rew were rescued.
Ceto	United Kingdom	The ship was driven ashore at Viana do Castelo, Portugal. She was on a voyage from Queenstown, County Cork to Viana do Castelo. She was refloated on 30 January.
Cluny	United Kingdom	The ship struck a sunken rock and was damaged. She was on a voyage from Liverpool, Lancashire to New Orleans, Louisiana, United States. She consequently put in to Ardrossan, Ayrshire.
Fortune	United Kingdom	The ship was driven onto the Rock Perch, on the coast of Devon. she was on a voyage from Whitehaven, Cumberland to Dublin.
Governor Higginson	United Kingdom	The ship was destroyed by fire at Madras, India.
Grace and Janes	United Kingdom	The ship ran aground on the Scroby Sands, Norfolk. She was on a voyage from Arbroath, Forfarshire to London. She was refloated and taken in to Great Yarmouth, Norfolk.
Isabella Scott	United Kingdom	The ship ran aground and was damaged at Appledore, Devon.

== 26 January ==
List of shipwrecks: 26 January 1853
Ship	State	Description
Ann	United Kingdom	The ship was driven ashore and wrecked south of Malahide, County Dublin. Her crew were rescued.
Hermann Wilhelm	Flag unknown	The ship sprang a leak off Løkken-Vrå, Denmark and was beached near Hjørring. Her crew were rescued.
Hibernia	United Kingdom	The sloop was driven ashore and wrecked at Thurlestone, Devon. Her crew were rescued. She was on a voyage from Ipswich, Suffolk to Exeter, Devon.
Leipzig	United Kingdom	The ship ran aground in the Mapoon Bight. She was on a voyage from Moulmein, Burma to a British port. She was refloated and resumed her voyage.
Lucy Ann	United Kingdom	The sloop was driven ashore at Starcross, Devon. Her crew were rescued. She was on a voyage from Ipswich to Exeter. She was refloated on 31 January.
N. B. Palmer	United States	The ship ran aground on the Brouwer Shoals, in the Java Sea. She was on a voyage from Shanghai, China to New York. She was refloated and put in to Surabaya, Netherland East Indies for repairs.
Sarah	United Kingdom	The ship sank in Crowe Sound, Isles of Scilly. Her crew were rescued.
William	United Kingdom	The ship was driven ashore at Starcross. Her crew were rescued. She was on a voyage from Ipswich to Exeter. She was refloated on 31 January.

== 27 January ==
List of shipwrecks: 27 January 1853
Ship	State	Description
Ligero	Spain	The ship was wrecked on the Puercos Reef with the loss of all but one of her crew. She was on a voyage from Algeciras to Cádiz.
Margaret and Elizabeth	United Kingdom	The ship was holed by her anchor and sank at Dungarvan, County Waterford. She was on a voyage from Youghal, County Cork to Cardiff, Glamorgan. She had been refloated and beached by 4 February.
Mercator	United Kingdom	The ship departed from Calcutta, India for Melbourne, Victoria. No further trace, presumed foundered with the loss of all hands.
Presto	United Kingdom	The ship was driven ashore at Wexford. She was on a voyage from Corfu, United States of the Ionian Islands to Wexford.
Susannah Elizabeth	Netherlands	The galiot was driven ashore in the Dardanelles. She was on a voyage from Brăila, Ottoman Empire to a British port. She was refloated the next day.

== 28 January ==
List of shipwrecks: 28 January 1853
Ship	State	Description
Bella	United Kingdom	The brig was driven ashore in The Narrows, near New York, United States.
Elizabeth	United Kingdom	The schooner was driven ashore on Governors Island, New York. She was on a voyage from New York to Sierra Leone.
Leipzig	United Kingdom	The ship ran aground off Natmoo, Burma. She was on a voyage from Moulmein, Burma to a British port. She was refloated and resumed her voyage.
Liddell	United Kingdom	The brig was abandoned in the Bay of Biscay. Her crew were rescued by the schooner Margaret and Jane (United Kingdom). Liddell was on a voyage from Sunderland, County Durham to the Charente.

== 29 January ==
List of shipwrecks: 29 January 1853
Ship	State	Description
Armida	United Kingdom	The ship struck the Pearl Rock and was damaged. She was on a voyage from Galaţi, Ottoman Empire to Queenstown, County Cork. She consequently put in to Gibraltar in a leaky condition.
Berkeley	United Kingdom	The ship was driven ashore at Cádiz, Spain. She was on a voyage from Trieste to Liverpool, Lancashire. Berkeley was condemned in June.
Bolton	United Kingdom	The ship ran aground on the Margate Sand. She was on a voyage from London to Sydney, New South Wales. She was refloated and subsequently put back to London.
Conference	United Kingdom	The ship was driven ashore at Redcar, Yorkshire. She was on a voyage from London to South Shields, County Durham. She was later refloated and taken under tow.
Rose	United Kingdom	The ship was driven ashore at Marske-by-the-Sea, Yorkshire. She was on a voyage from Fosdyke, Lincolnshire to Stockton-on-Tees, County Durham. She was refloated and resumed her voyage.

== 30 January ==
List of shipwrecks: 30 January 1853
Ship	State	Description
Ann C. Pratt	United States	The ship was damaged by ice in the Delaware River and sank at Philadelphia, Pennsylvania.
Bell and Mary	United Kingdom	The ship capsized at Dundee, Forfarshire. She was on a voyage from Newburgh, Fife to Newcastle upon Tyne, Northumberland.
Susan	United Kingdom	The schooner sprang a leak and sank in Bell Sound, Isles of Scilly. All on board were rescued. She was on a voyage from Cardiff, Glamorgan to Tenerife, Canary Islands.

== 31 January ==
List of shipwrecks: 31 January 1853
Ship	State	Description
Boderick	United Kingdom	The ship was destroyed by fire in the Regents Canal at Limehouse, Middlesex.
Felicity	United Kingdom	The ship was holed by the anchor of Terpsichore (United Kingdom) and sank at Cork.
Guinare	(United Kingdom of Great Britain and Ireland) Jersey	The ship was wrecked 10 nautical miles (19 km) north of Aveiro, Portugal. She was on a voyage from London to Figueira da Foz, Portugal.
Margaret Grace	United Kingdom	The ship was run down and sunk off Rathmullan, County Donegal HMRC Seamew ( Board of Customs ). She was on a voyage from Liverpool to Sligo. She was refloated on 15 August and taken in to Rathmullen.
Sarah	United Kingdom	The ship ran aground at Falmouth, Jamaica. She was refloated with assistance from HMS Alban (Royal Navy).
Secret	United Kingdom	The ship was driven ashore at Scalby, Yorkshire. She was on a voyage from Sunderland, County Durham to Hong Kong. She was refloated on 2 February and put in to the River Tyne.

== Unknown date ==
List of shipwrecks: Unknown date in January 1853
Ship	State	Description
Agamemnon	Flag unknown	The ship ran aground on the Dragoer Shoal, in the Baltic Sea before 22 January. She was refloated and put in to Copenhagen, Denmark in a leaky condition.
Amstel	Netherlands	The ship was driven ashore on Madura Island, Netherlands East Indies. She was on a voyage from Surabaya to Samarang. She was refloated and put back to Surabaya, where she arrived on 3 January.
Anna Dorothea	Sweden	The ship foundered in the Atlantic Ocean. Her crew were rescued by Matanzas (United Kingdom). Anna Dorothea was on a voyage from Stockholm to Messina, Sicily.
Baronet	United Kingdom	The ship was abandoned in the North Sea before 24 January. Her crew were rescued by Longriel (Flag unknown). Baronet was on a voyage from Gothenburg, Sweden to Hull, Yorkshire.
Cambyses	(United Kingdom of Great Britain and Ireland) Jamaica	The ship ran aground on the Florida Reef before 22 January. She was on a voyage from Jamaica to Liverpool, Lancashire. She was refloated and taken in to Key West, Florida, United States. She was consequently condemned, but was repaired and departed on 19 March for New York, United States.
City of Melbourne	(United Kingdom of Great Britain and Ireland) Victoria	The steamship was driven ashore whilst on a voyage from Kingsland, New Zealand to Sydney, New South Wales. She was refloated and completed her voyage, arriving on 13 January.
Eliza	France	The ship was wrecked at Saint-Louis, Senegal before 19 January.
Enterprise	United Kingdom	The ship was wrecked on Bardsey Island, Pembrokeshire before 23 January with loss of life.
Henriette Armandine	France	The ship ran aground at the mouth of the Cotinginba River. She was refloated and put in to Bahia, Brazil on 5 January, where she was condemned.
Herranchampan	Republic of New Granada	The ship sank at Honda before 4 January.
Hunwick	United Kingdom	The steamship ran aground on the Herd Sand, in the North Sea off the coast of County Durham. She was on a voyage from Hartlepool, County Durham to London. She was refloated and resumed her voyage, arriving on 24 January.
Jessie	United Kingdom	The ship foundered before 27 January. Her ten crew took to a boat and were rescued the next day by Mazatlan (United States). Jessie was on a voyage from Falmouth, Cornwall to Limerick.
John Richardson	United Kingdom	The ship was lost in the Gulf of Choco. Her crew were rescued. She was on a voyage from Liverpool to Panama City, Republic of New Granada.
Lady Clinton	United States	The ship was abandoned in the Atlantic Ocean. Her crew were rescued.
Lord Brougham	United Kingdom	The ship ran aground on the Herd Sand. She was refloated on 25 January and taken in to South Shields, County Durham in a severely damaged condition.
Lucy	United Kingdom	The ship ran aground on the Salt Kay. She was on a voyage from New Orleans, Louisiana, United States to Liverpool. She had been refloated by 4 February.
Maas	Netherlands	The ship was driven ashore near Laholm, Sweden before 11 January. She was on a voyage from Java, Netherlands East Indies to Rotterdam, South Holland and Copenhagen, Denmark.
Marucco	Greece	The brig was driven ashore and severely damaged at Cardiff, Glamorgan, United Kingdom. She was on a voyage from Falmouth to Belfast, County Antrim. She was refloated.
Mary	United Kingdom	The brig was abandoned in the English Channel 18 nautical miles (33 km) off Deadman Point, Cornwall. Her crew were rescued by Frederick Wilhelm IV (Prussia). Mary was on a voyage from Sunderland, County Durham to the Charente.
Ottavia	United Kingdom	The ship foundered in the Atlantic Ocean 100 nautical miles (190 km) east of Barbados before 18 January. Her crew were rescued. She was on a voyage from Pernambuco, Brazil to Genoa, Kingdom of Sardinia.
Perfection	United Kingdom	The ship was abandoned at sea. Her crew were rescued.
Petrus	Belgium	The ship was driven ashore between Kaïffa and Jaffa, Ottoman Syria before 3 January.
Robert and Ellen	United Kingdom	The ship foundered in the Dogger Bank. Her crew were rescued by the fishing smack Endright (Belgium).
Vanguard	(United Kingdom of Great Britain and Ireland) British North America	The ship was abandoned in the Atlantic Ocean. Her crew were rescued by Lady Sale (United Kingdom). Vanguard was on a voyage from Saint John, New Brunswick to Liverpool, Lancashire.
Vaux	United Kingdom	The ship ran aground on the Herd Sand. She was refloated on 25 January and taken in to South Shields in a severely damaged condition.
Vigilant	United Kingdom	The ship was driven ashore at Lindesnes, Norway. She was refloated and assisted in to Mandal, Norway, where she arrived on 9 January.
Woodville	United Kingdom	The ship was driven ashore on "Dagoe". She was refloated and put in to Copenhagen, Denmark in a leaky condition. She arrived on 9 January.
