= List of Sites of Special Scientific Interest in Mull, Coll and Tiree =

The following is a list of Sites of Special Scientific Interest in the Mull, Coll and Tiree Area of Search. For other areas, see List of SSSIs by Area of Search.

- Allt Molach
- Ardalanish Bay
- Ardmeanach
- Ardtun Leaf Beds
- Ardura - Auchnacraig
- Ben More - Scarisdale
- Calgary Dunes
- Ceann a'Mhara to Loch a'Phuill
- Coladoir Bog
- Crossapol and Gunna
- Cruach Choireadail
- Glas Eileanan
- Gribun Shore and Crags
- Hough Bay and Balevullin Machair
- Lagganulva Wood
- Loch Ba Woodland
- Loch Sguabain
- North East Coll Lochs and Moors
- S'Airde Beinn
- Sleibhtean agus Cladach Thiriodh
- Sound of Mull Cliffs
- South Mull Coast
- Staffa
- Totamore Dunes and Loch Ballyhaugh
- Treshnish Isles
