= Ardura =

Coordinates: 56°24′30.8″N 5°45′11.5″W

Eredine
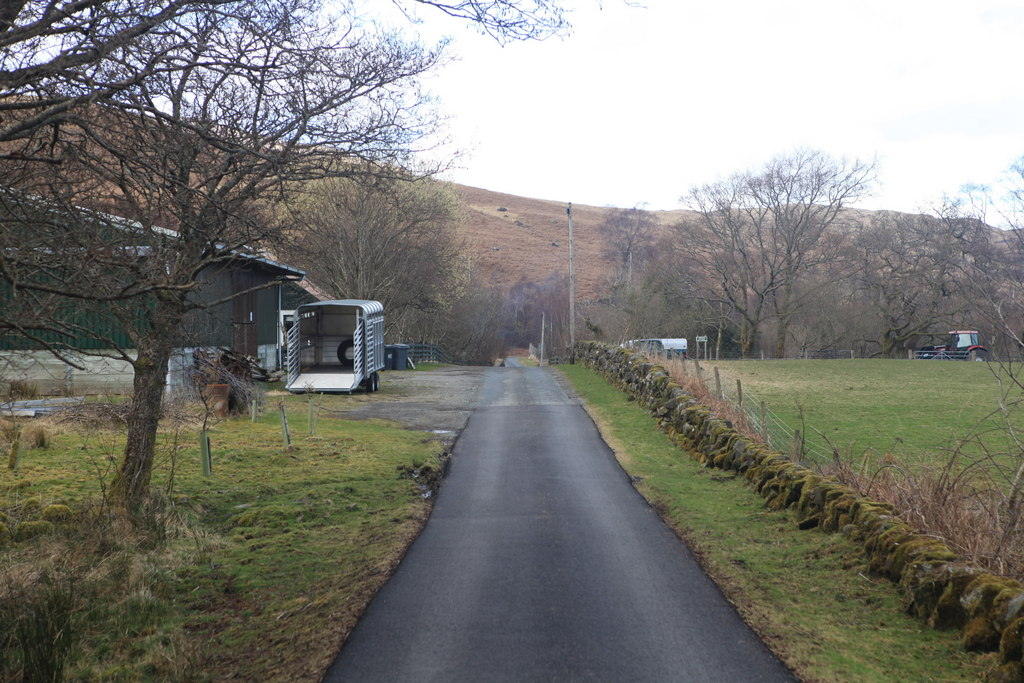
- Road in Ardura

- Location within Argyll and Bute
- Council area: Argyll and Bute
- Country: Scotland
- Sovereign state: United Kingdom
- Police: Scotland
- Fire: Scottish
- Ambulance: Scottish

Ardura is a small settlement and rural estate on the Isle of Mull, in the council area of Argyll and Bute, Scotland. It is south-west of Lochdon. Areas nearby include Ardachoil Farm and Inverlussa.

The river Lussa runs through Ardura emptying in the northern part of Loch Spelve.

Cruach Ardura is a hill in the south-west of Ardura (217m elvation).

== History ==
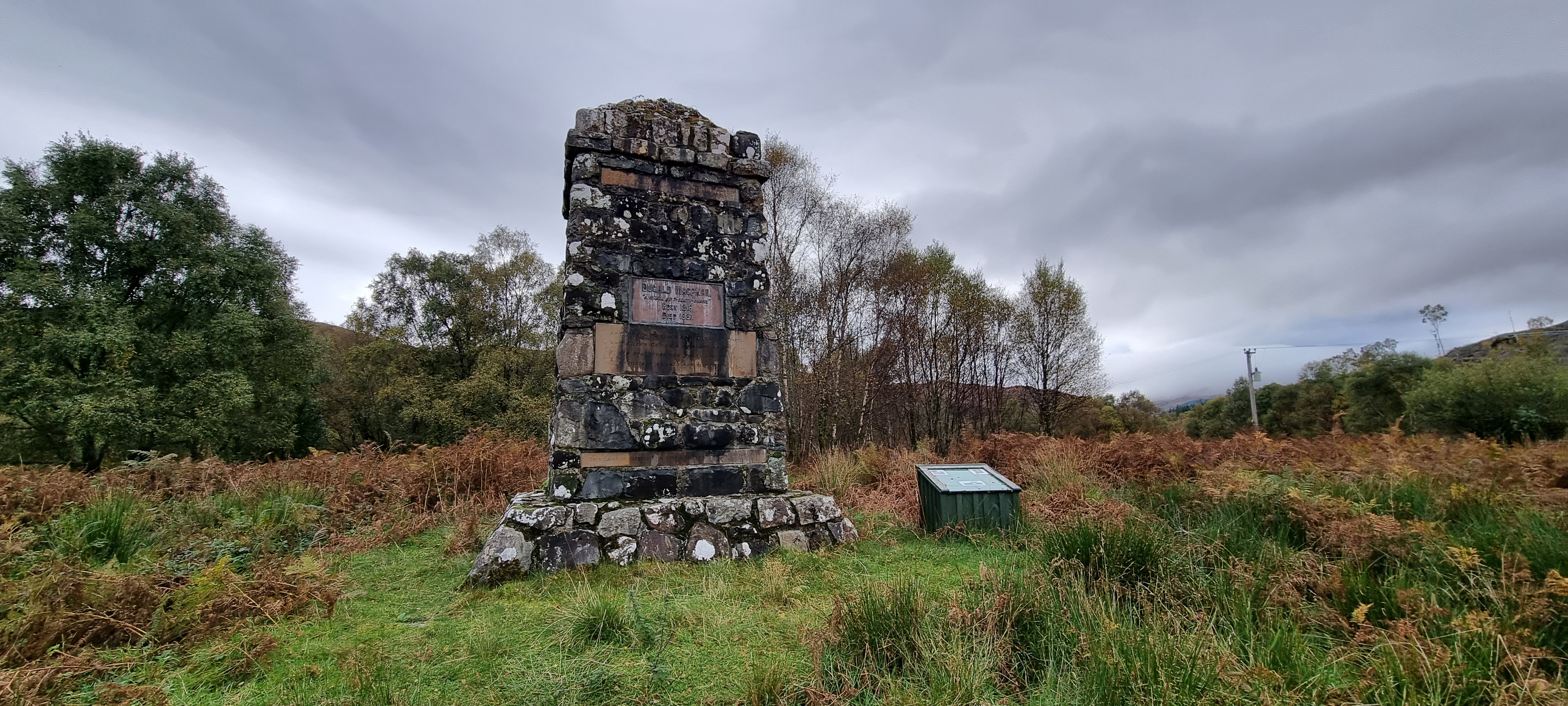
Monument to Dugald MacPhail

Strathcoil was an historic township in the area that originally had at least three buildings in the late 19th century but all are now ruined.

In the 18th and 19th centuries, oak woodlands were planted to the south of Ardura. Tanbark and charcoal were produced for a furnace at Lorna.

In 1929, a stone monument was unveiled to the Gaelic poet Dugald MacPhail (1818-87) at the Strathcoil road junction in Ardura that connects with Lochbuie. The statue was unviled by Mrs Murray Guthrie, a female banker and chairman of the Parish Council at the time. It can still be seen. Dugald lived at the now ruined Strathcoil settlement in Ardura and wrote several Gaelic songs and poems including An t-Eilean Muileach (The Isle of Mull).

In April 2025, the Ardura Community forest park and nature trail were the site of a royal visit by William, Prince of Wales and Catherine, Princess of Wales.

== Buildings ==
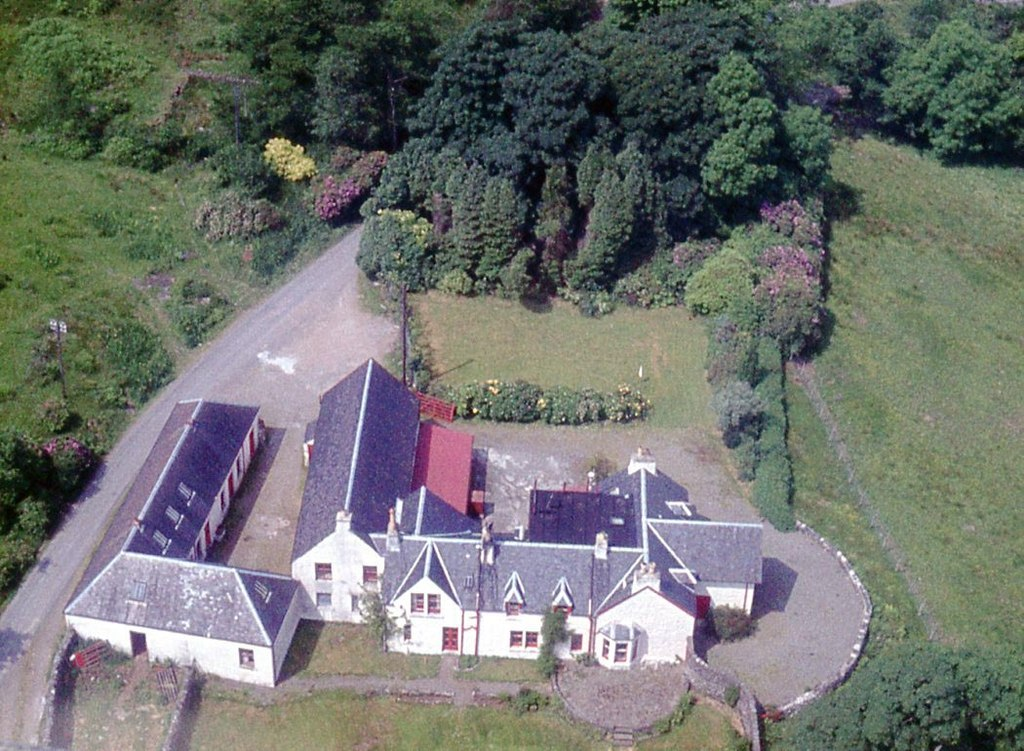
Ardura Farm

Ardura lodge is a hunting lodge on the Ardura Estate.

There is a farm at Ardura.

== Community facilities ==
There is a community forest park at Ardura that is managed by residents of the Mull and Iona Community Trust. It was purchased and restored by the trust with the aid of grants in 2019. The oldest known tree in the forest is a holly tree dated to 1733 and much of the woodland contains ancient oaks.
