= Croggan =

Coordinates: 56°22′N 5°42′W

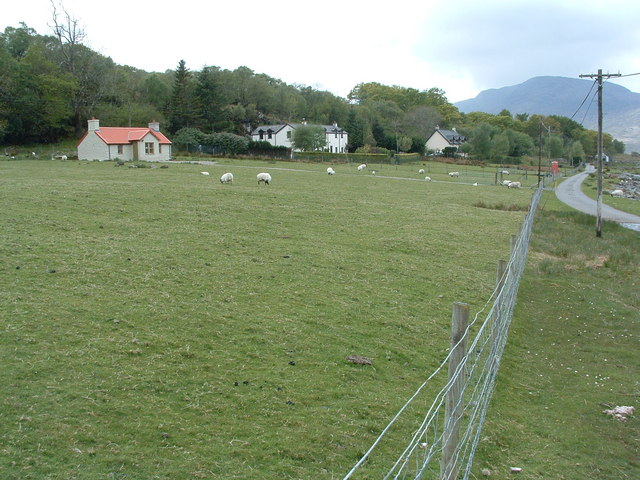

- Location within Argyll and Bute
- OS grid reference: NM705272
- Council area: Argyll and Bute
- Lieutenancy area: Argyll and Bute
- Country: Scotland
- Sovereign state: United Kingdom
- Post town: ISLE OF MULL
- Postcode district: PA63
- Police: Scotland
- Fire: Scottish
- Ambulance: Scottish
- UK Parliament: Argyll, Bute and South Lochaber
- Scottish Parliament: Argyll and Bute

Croggan is a small scattered settlement on the Loch Spelve sea loch, in the south of the Isle of Mull, Argyll and Bute, Scotland. It is located in the Torosay parish. There is a beach.

The nearest village is Lochbuie.

There is a former school and schoolhouse.

== History ==
In 1880, the village comprised three unroofed, three partially roofed, seven roofed buildings and three enclosures.

== Economy ==
There is an aquaculture operator in Croggan that farms oysters.
