= Lochdon Free Church =

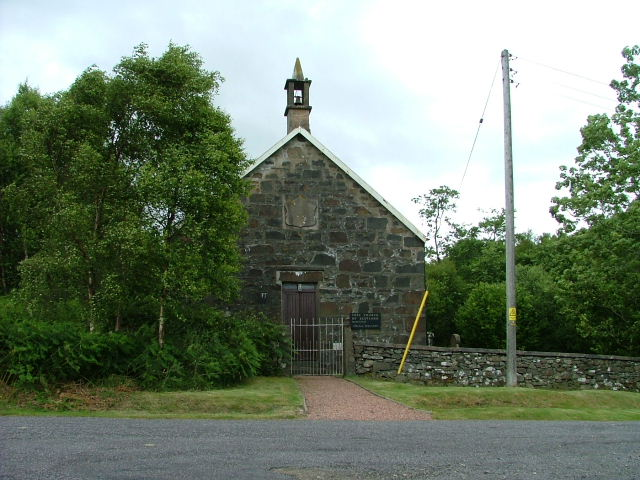
- Lochdon Free Church of Scotland

- Location on Mull
- 56°26′00″N 5°41′22″W
- Location: Lochdon, Isle of Mull
- Country: Scotland
- Denomination: Free Church of Scotland

History
- Founded: 1843
- Founder: John McKane

Architecture
- Functional status: Church
- Completed: 1852

The Lochdon Free Church is a place of worship of the Free Church of Scotland in Lochdon on the Isle of Mull, Scotland. The church was built in 1852.
