= Lochdon =

Village on the Isle of Mull, Scotland

Coordinates: 56.436117°N 5.687538°W

Lochdon: Scottish Gaelic: Loch Dona
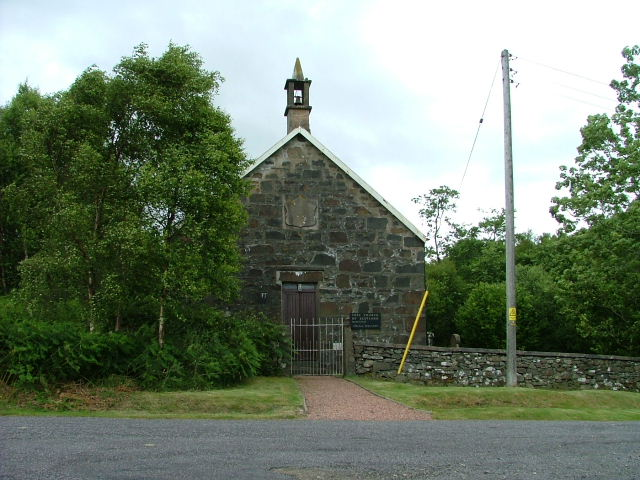
- Lochdon Free Church

- Location within Argyll and Bute
- OS grid reference: NM728333
- Community council: Mull
- Council area: Argyll and Bute
- Lieutenancy area: Argyll and Bute
- Country: Scotland
- Sovereign state: United Kingdom
- Post town: ISLE OF MULL
- Postcode district: PA64 6
- Dialling code: 01680
- Police: Scotland
- Fire: Scottish
- Ambulance: Scottish
- UK Parliament: Argyll, Bute and South Lochaber
- Scottish Parliament: Argyll and Bute

Lochdon or Lochdonhead (Scottish Gaelic: Loch Dona or Scottish Gaelic: Cheann Loch Dona) is a small village on the Isle of Mull, in the council area of Argyll and Bute, off the west coast of Scotland. The village is within the parish of Torosay, just south of Craignure on the A849 at the head of Loch Don. The name Lochdonhead means "The head of the bad loch".

The Lochdon Free Church is located in the town.
