= Loch Spelve =

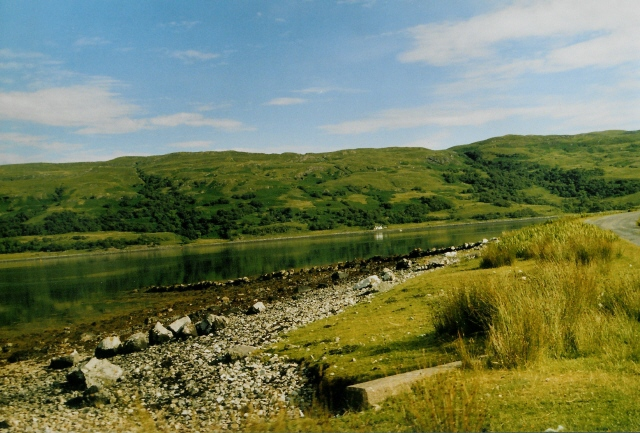
- West end of Loch Spelve, a few hundred yards from the west end of the loch.
- Interactive map of Loch Spelve
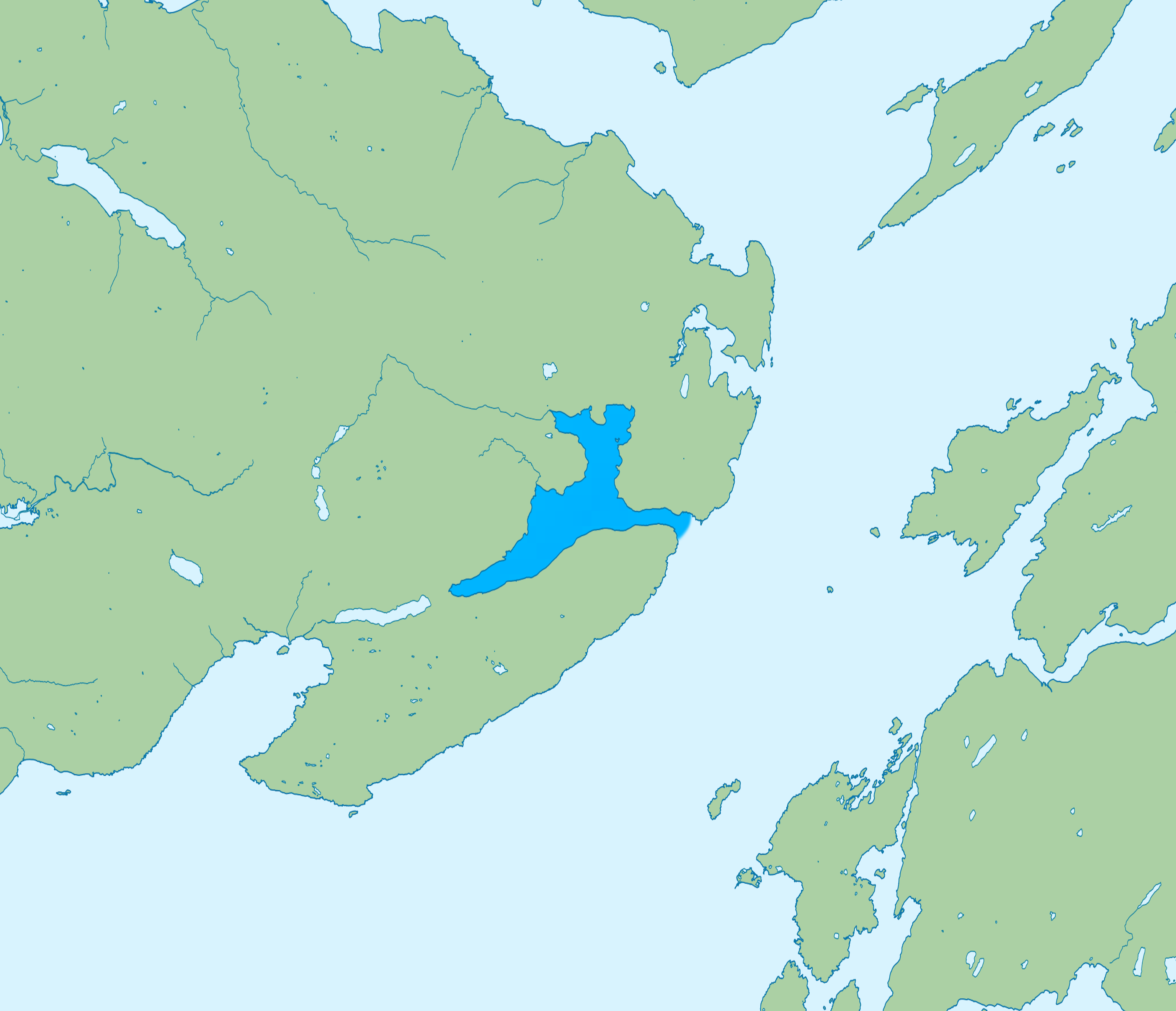
- Map of Loch Spelve
- Location: Isle of Mull, Argyll and Bute, Scotland
- Coordinates: 56.388°N 5.730°W
- Type: Sea loch
- Catchment area: 76 square kilometres (29 sq mi)
- Basin countries: Scotland, United Kingdom
- Max. length: 7.7 kilometres (4.8 mi)
- Surface area: 8.93 square kilometres (3.45 sq mi)
- Max. depth: 58 metres (190 ft)
- Islands: Eilean Amalaig and Sgeir na Faoilinn, among others
- Settlements: Kinlochspelve, Ardura

Loch Spelve is a sea loch on the southeast coast of the Isle of Mull, off the west coast of Scotland. It is almost landlocked with a relatively narrow opening onto the Firth of Lorn. The A849 road runs past the northern arm of the loch and a minor road runs south from it and around the shore of the western arm via Kinlochspelve as far as the settlement of Croggan. Raised beaches are notable features of the loch, particularly on the shores of the narrows through which it enters the open waters of the firth. There are a few rocky islets within the loch, the largest of which is Eilean Amalaig on which are the ruins of a castle.

The river Lussa enters the northern part of the Loch as it flows past Ardura.

== Geology ==
There is a terminal moraine at Kinlochspelve dating from the last ice age. The southern and eastern shores of Loch Spelve are formed from basalt lava flows of Palaeogene age, intruded by numerous dolerite dykes. The northern and western shores are formed in granophyres and Triassic sandstones, the latter intruded by olivine-dolerite cone sheets associated with the Palaeogene volcanism. Though unseen at the surface, the Great Glen Fault is usually considered to run beneath this loch and nearby Loch Buie.

== Aquaculture ==
Rope-grown Mussel farming takes place in the loch at Inverlussa where there is a quayside and jetty.
