= Loch Buie =

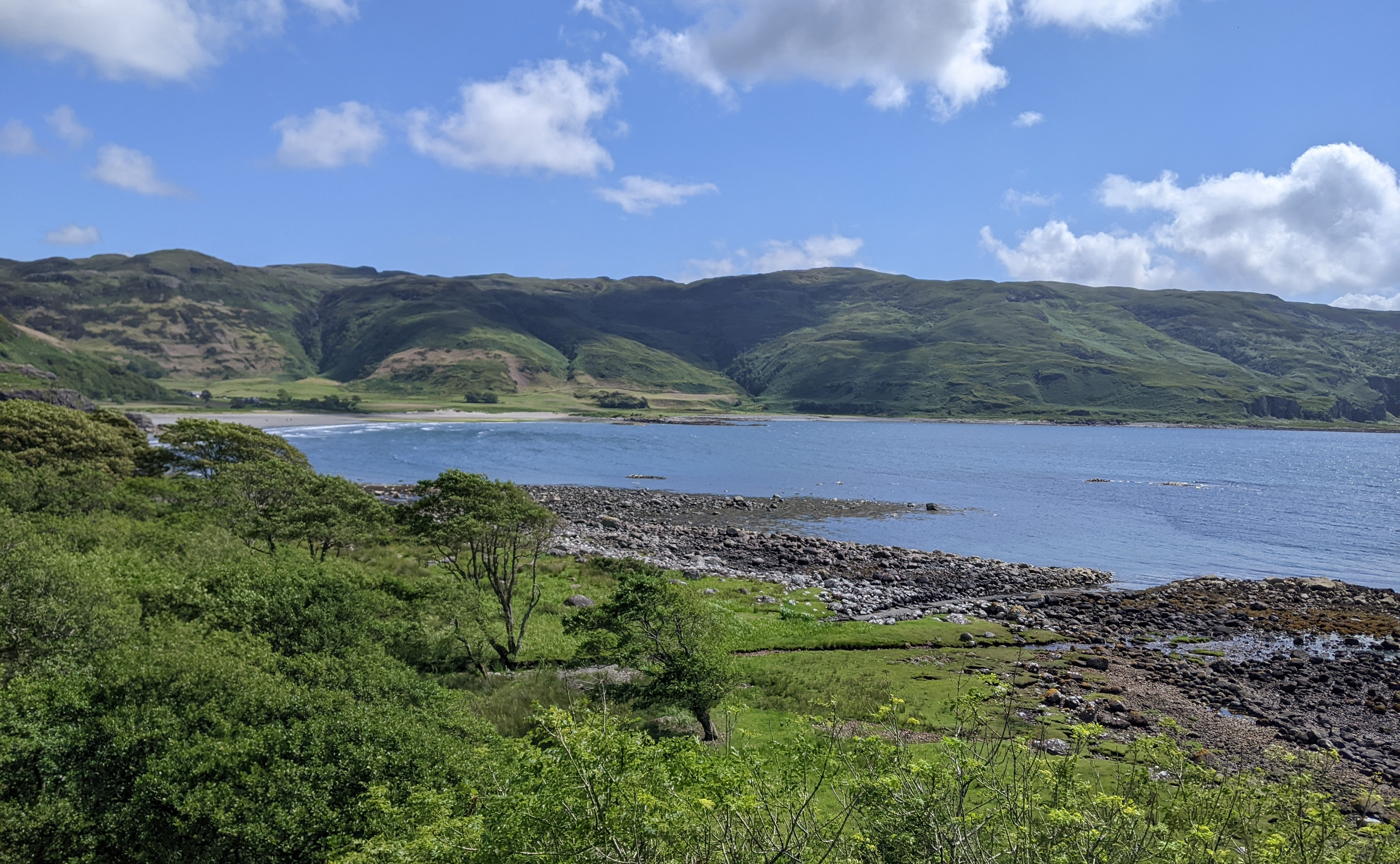
- The mouth of Loch Buie from Moy Castle
- Interactive map of Loch Buie
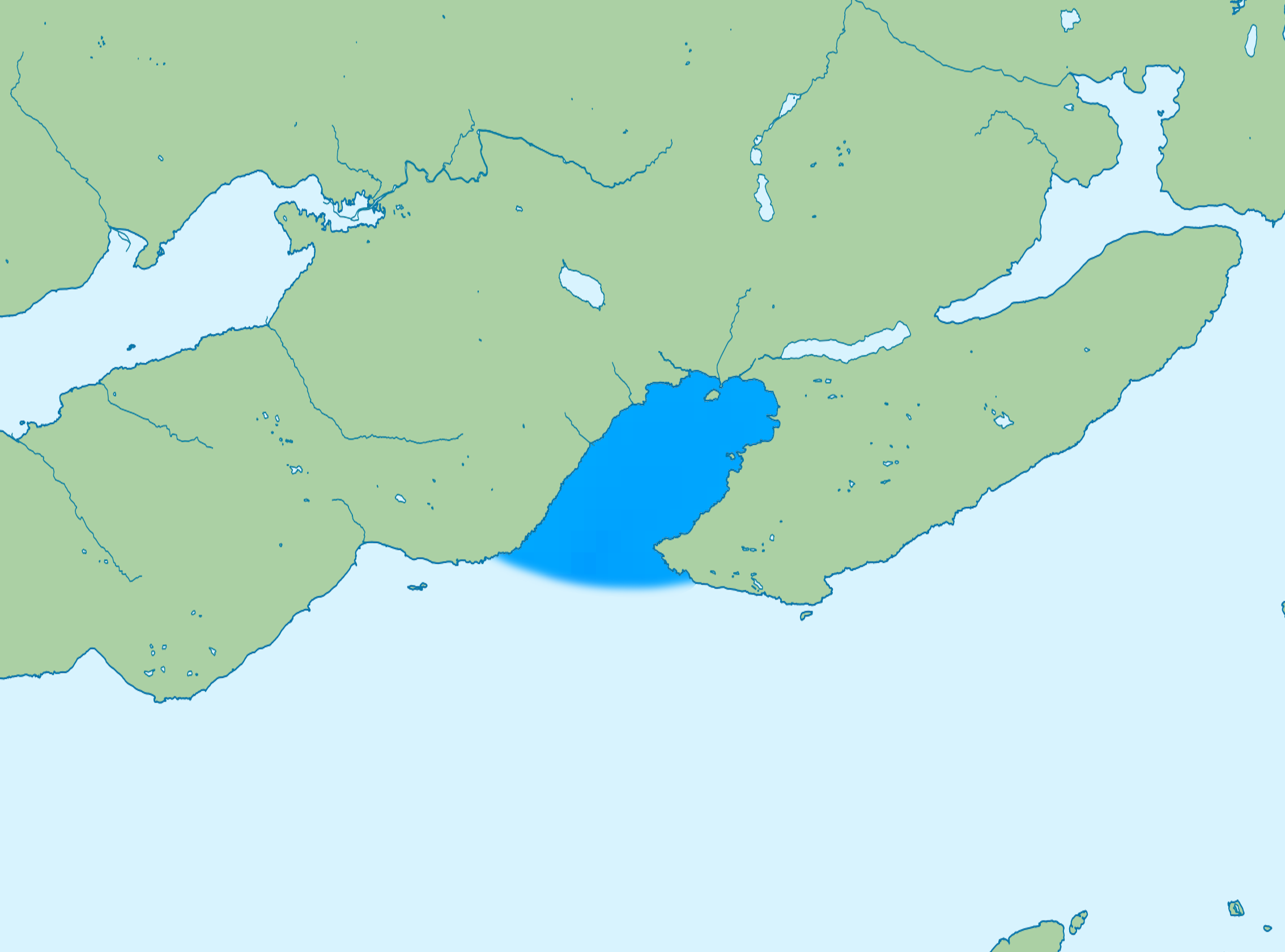
- Map of Loch Buie
- Location: Isle of Mull, Argyll and Bute, Scotland
- Coordinates: 56°20′N 5°53′W
- Type: Sea loch
- Basin countries: Scotland, United Kingdom
- Islands: Tidal island Eilean Mòr and other small islands

Loch Buie (Scottish Gaelic: Locha Buidhe, meaning "yellow loch") is a sea loch on the south coast of the Isle of Mull, off the west coast of Scotland. It takes the form of a deep bay opening onto the Firth of Lorn. At the head of the loch is the settlement of Lochbuie at the end of a minor road form the A849 at Ardura. There are a handful of small islands and rocky islets close to shore, the largest of which is Eilean Mor which is connected to the mainland of Mull at low tide. Nearby is Moy Castle. There are extensive shore platforms around the loch, notably on its southeastern side beneath Laggan Deer Forest.

== Geology ==
Numerous caves are located at the rear of this platform including Uaimh nan Taillearan. Sandy beaches lie at the head of the loch. The cliffs at either side are formed from basalt lava flows of Palaeogene age, intruded by numerous dolerite dykes. At the head of the loch, the rocks include granophyres and gabbro. Though unseen at the surface, the Great Glen Fault is usually considered to run beneath this loch and nearby Loch Spelve.

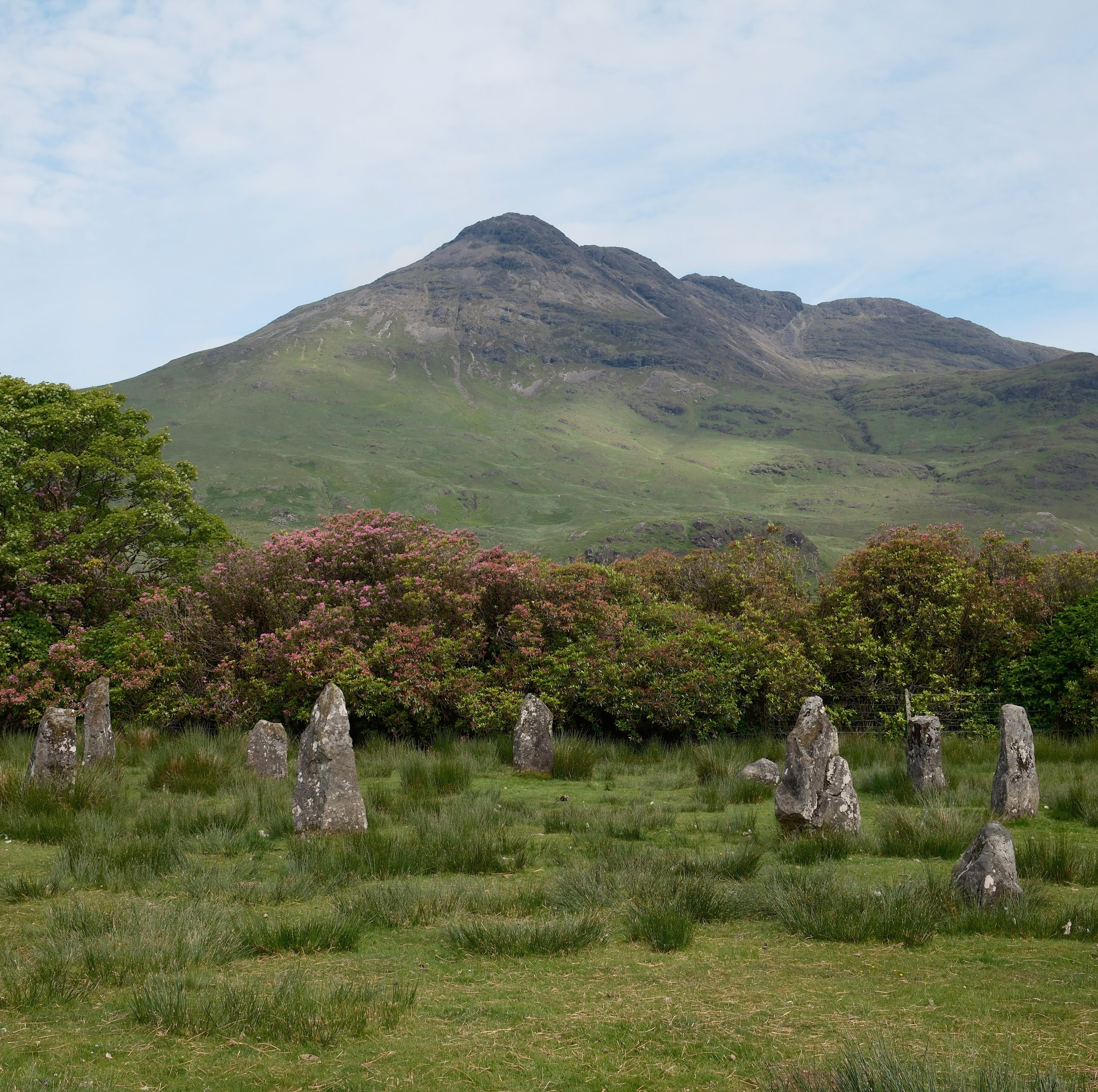
The Lochbuie stone circle. Ben Buie in the background
