= Loch Don =

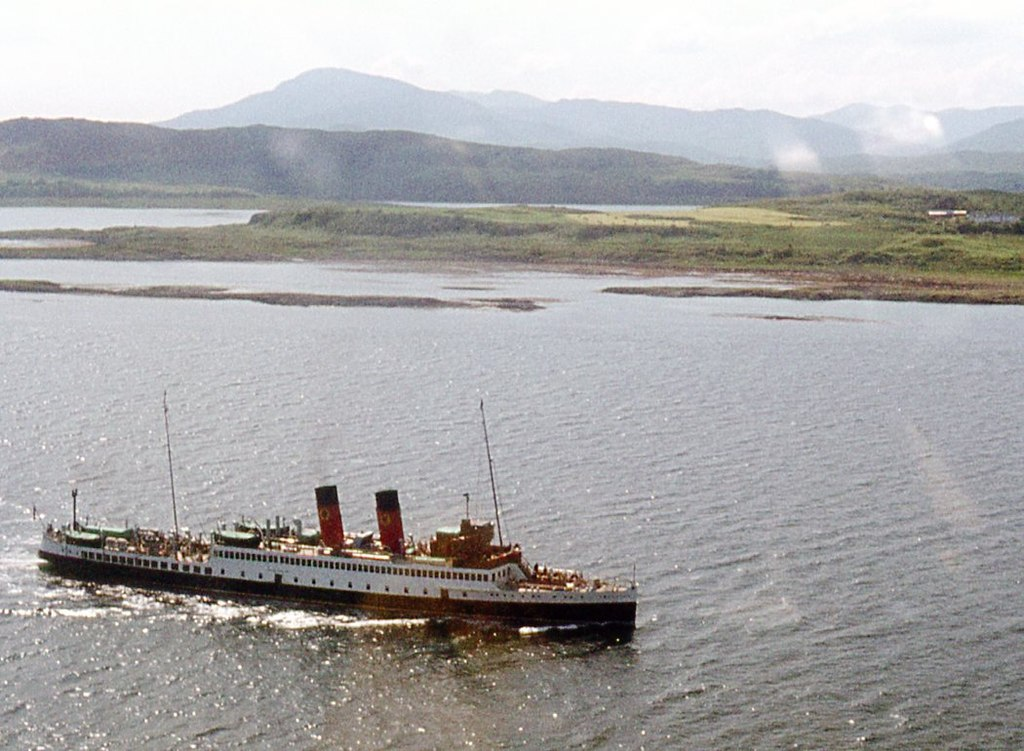
- TS King George V cruising through Loch Don
- Interactive map of Loch Don
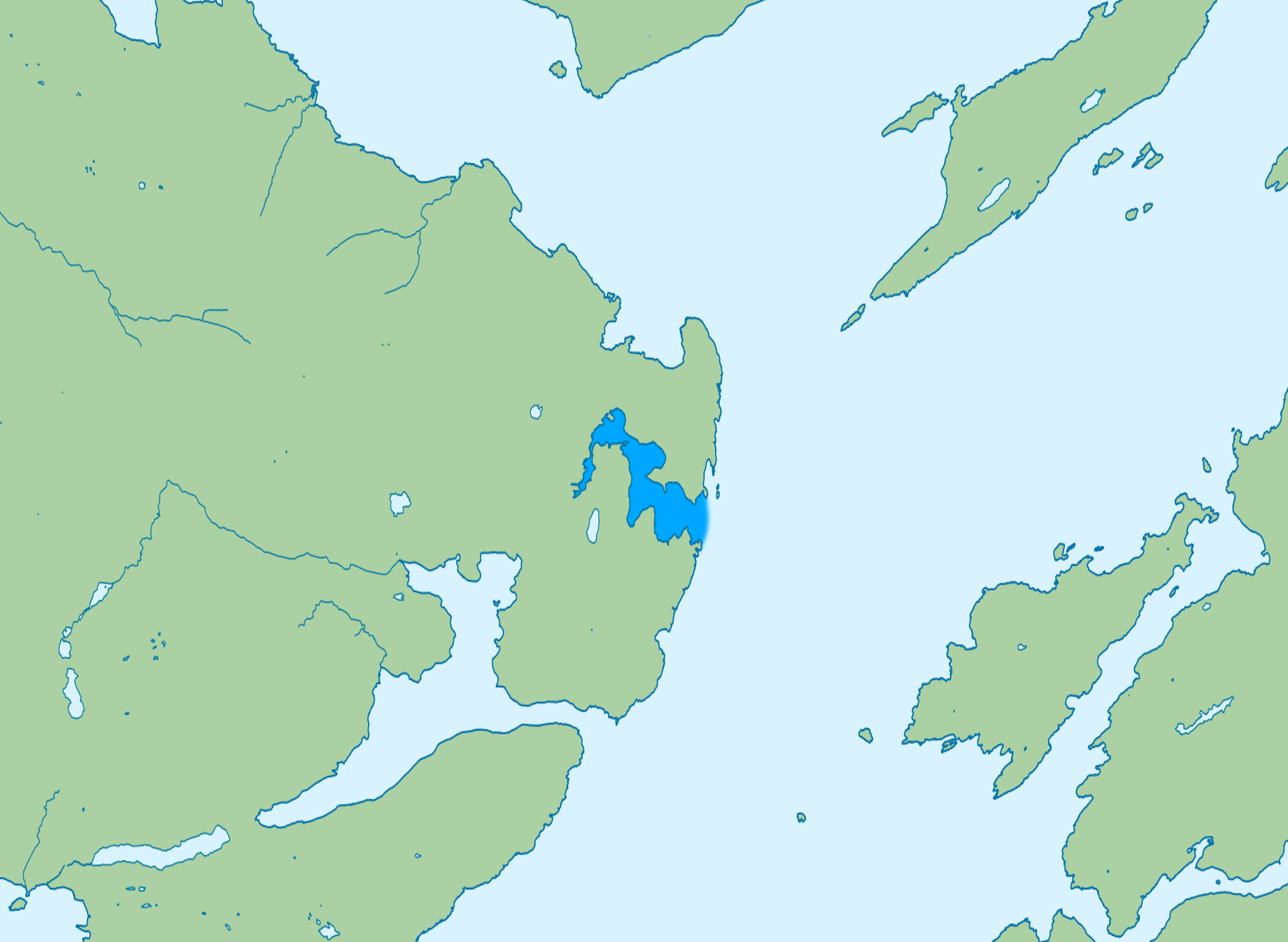
- Map of Loch Don
- Location: Isle of Mull, Argyll and Bute, Scotland
- Coordinates: 56.431°N 5.672°W
- Type: Sea loch
- Basin countries: Scotland, United Kingdom
- Islands: Few small islets
- Settlements: Lochdon

Loch Don is a sea loch on the east coast of the Isle of Mull, off the west coast of Scotland. It is an intricately shaped loch opening onto the Firth of Lorn near the easternmost point of Mull.

The community of Lochdon sits on the A849 at the head of the loch. A minor road runs south from Lochdon and around to Grass Point at the point where the loch meets the open waters of the firth.

== Geography ==
Its waters are shallow and the loch dries almost completely at low tide. There are both a terminal moraine and deltaic sand deposits around the northern end of the loch, a product of meltwater flow at the end of the last ice age. The shores of the outer part of the loch are formed from basalt lava flows of Palaeogene age whilst the inner parts of the loch extend across Palaeozoic basalt and also Mesozoic sedimentary rocks including Triassic sandstones and Jurassic Lias strata.
